= Brompton Cemetery =

Historic cemetery in London

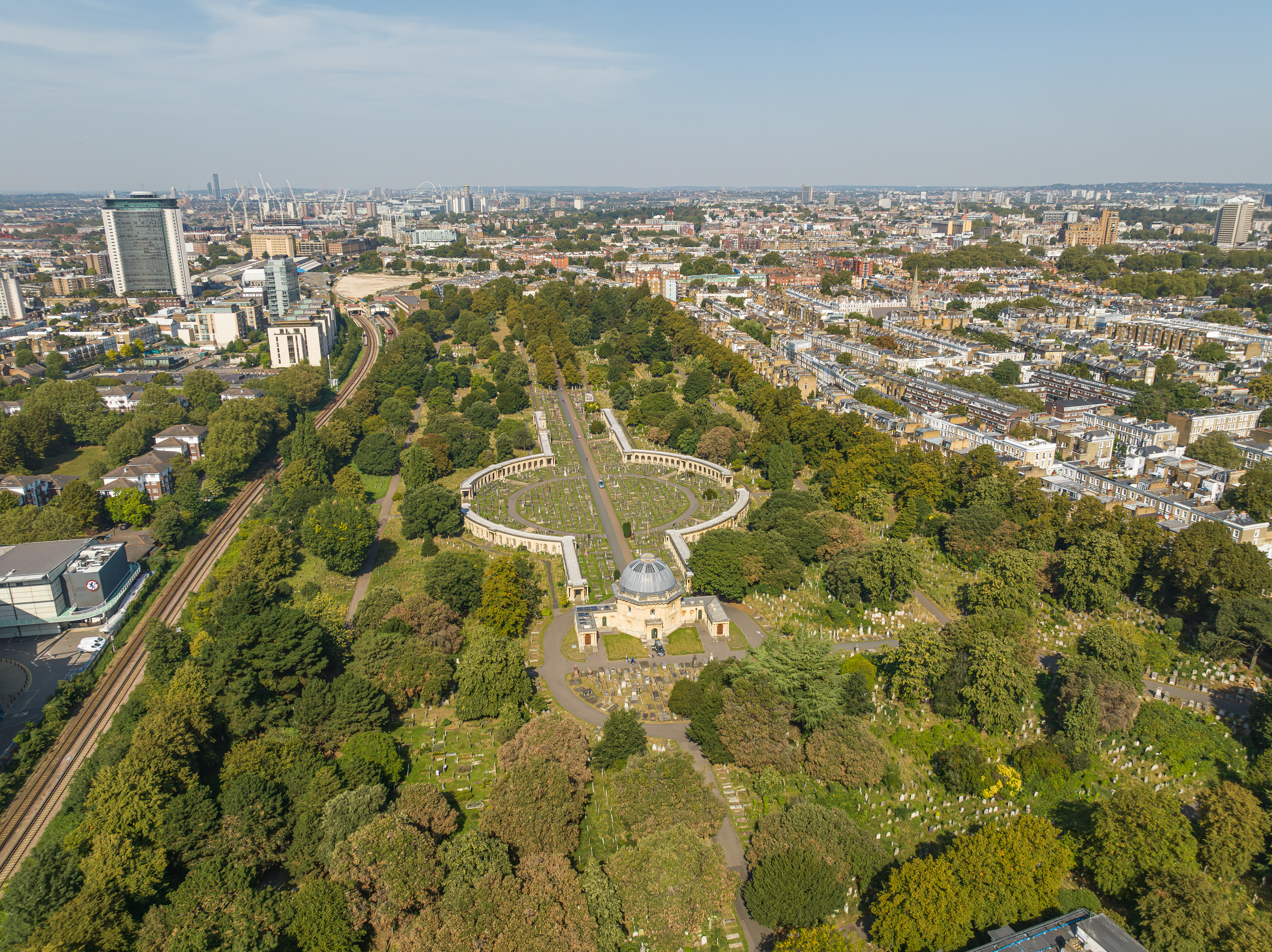
- Interactive map of Brompton Cemetery

Details
- Established: 1839
- Location: Fulham Road, London, SW10 9UG
- Country: England
- Coordinates: 51.4849°N 0.1908°W
- Type: Public
- Owned by: Crown property, managed by Royal Parks of London
- Size: 16 hectares (40 acres)
- No. of graves: 35,000+
- No. of interments: 205,000
- Website: Official website

Listed Building – Grade I
- Official name: Brompton Cemetery
- Designated: 1 October 1987
- Reference no.: 1000248

National Register of Historic Parks and Gardens
- Official name: Brompton Cemetery
- Designated: 1 October 1987
- Reference no.: 1000248

Brompton Cemetery (originally the West of London and Westminster Cemetery) is, since 1852, the first (and only) London cemetery to be Crown property, managed by The Royal Parks, in West Brompton in the Royal Borough of Kensington and Chelsea. It is one of the Magnificent Seven cemeteries. Established by Act of Parliament and laid out in 1839, it opened in 1840. Consecrated by Charles James Blomfield, Bishop of London, in June 1840, it is one of Britain's oldest and most distinguished garden cemeteries.

Some 35,000 monuments, from simple headstones to substantial mausolea, mark more than 205,000 resting places. The site includes large plots for family mausolea, and common graves where coffins are piled deep into the earth. It also has a small columbarium, and a secluded Garden of Remembrance at the northern end for cremated remains. The cemetery continues to be open for burials. It is also known as an urban haven for nature. In 2014, it was awarded a National Lottery grant to carry out essential restoration and develop a visitor centre, among other improvements. The restoration work was completed in 2018.

Although the cemetery was originally established by a private company, it is now the property of the Crown.

== Location ==
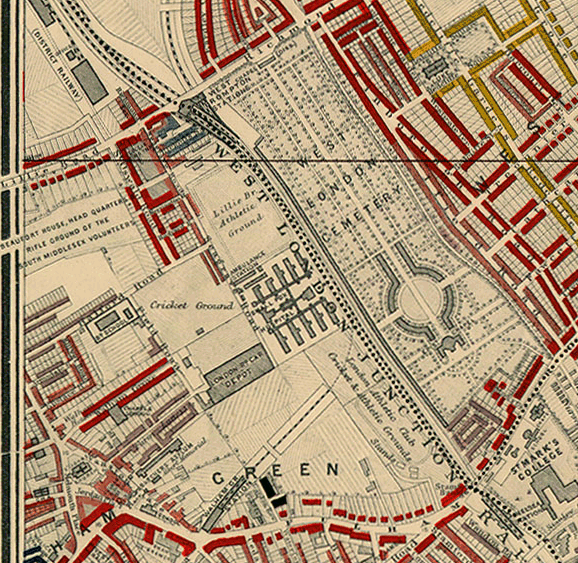
Charles Booth 1889 map – detail showing Brompton Cemetery

Brompton Cemetery is adjacent to West Brompton station in west London, England. The main entrance is at North Lodge, Old Brompton Road in West Brompton, SW5, in the Royal Borough of Kensington and Chelsea. There is another entrance at South Lodge, located on the Fulham Road, SW10 near the junction with Redcliffe Gardens.

== History ==
West of London and Westminster Cemetery Company Act 1837
- Act of Parliament
- Parliament of the United Kingdom
- Long title: An Act for establishing a Cemetery for the Interment of the Dead Westward of the Metropolis, by a Company to be called "The West of London and Westminster Cemetery Company."
- Citation: 7 Will. 4 & 1 Vict. c. cxxx

Dates
- Royal assent: 15 July 1837
Other legislation
Amended by	West of London and Westminster Cemetery Company Act 1845

West of London and Westminster Cemetery Company Act 1845
- Act of Parliament
- Parliament of the United Kingdom
- Long title: An Act for amending the Act establishing "The West of London and Westminster Cemetery Company;" and for enabling the Company to raise a further Sum of Money.
- Citation: 8 & 9 Vict. c. lxxvii

Dates
- Royal assent: 30 June 1845
Other legislation
Amends	West of London and Westminster Cemetery Company Act 1837

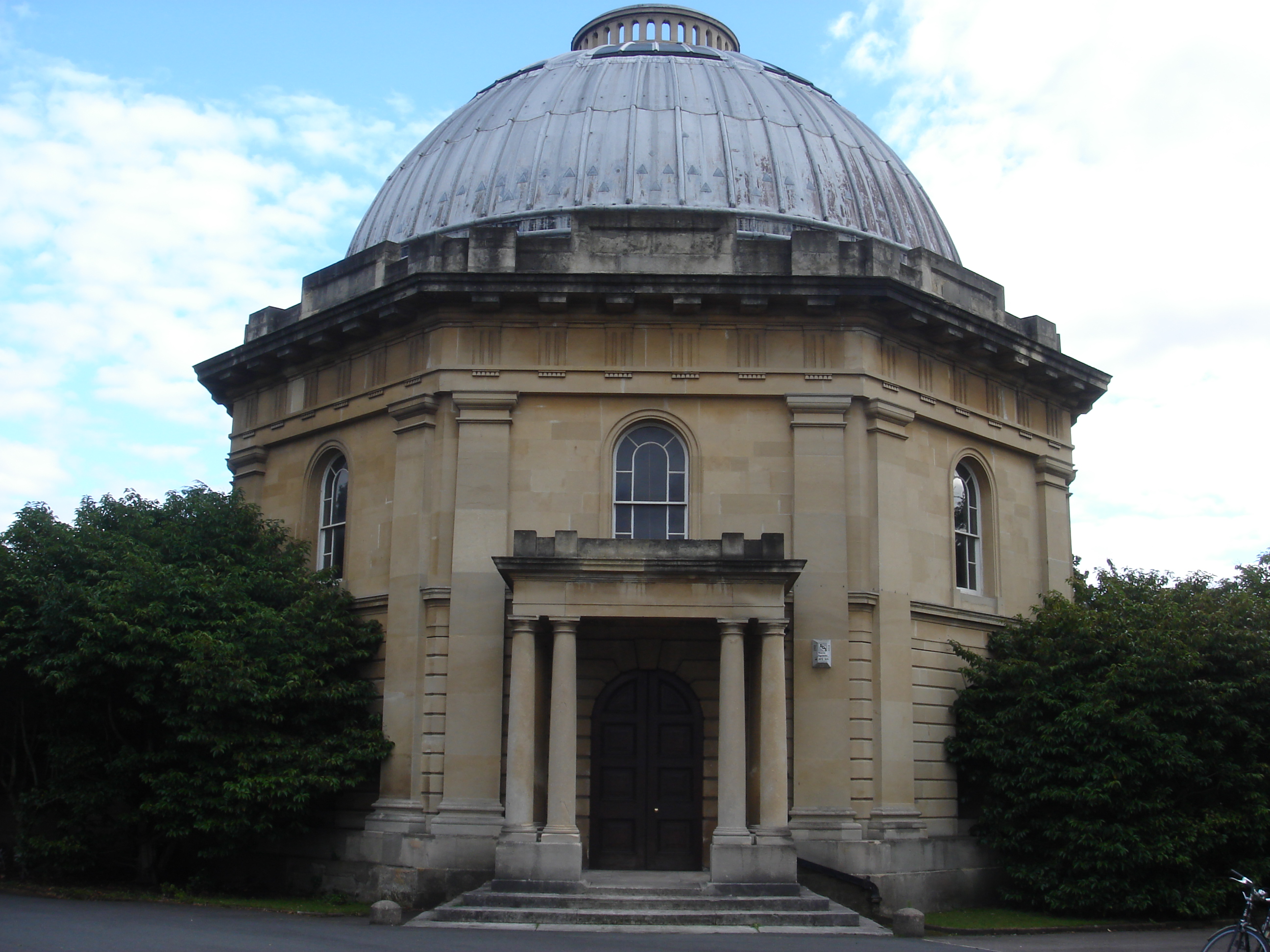
Brompton Cemetery Chapel

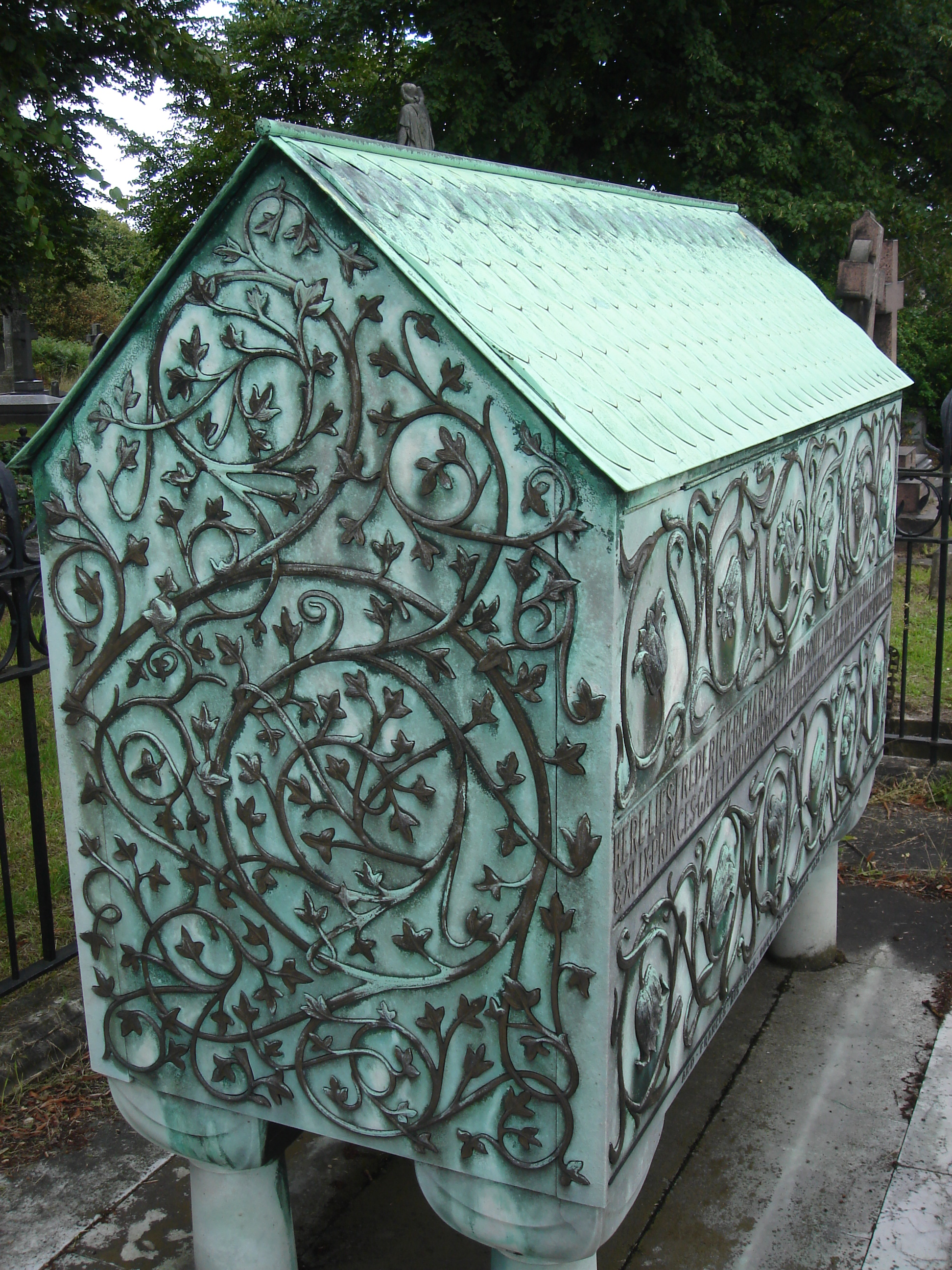
Tomb of Frederick Richards Leyland (the only Grade II* funerary monument in Brompton Cemetery)

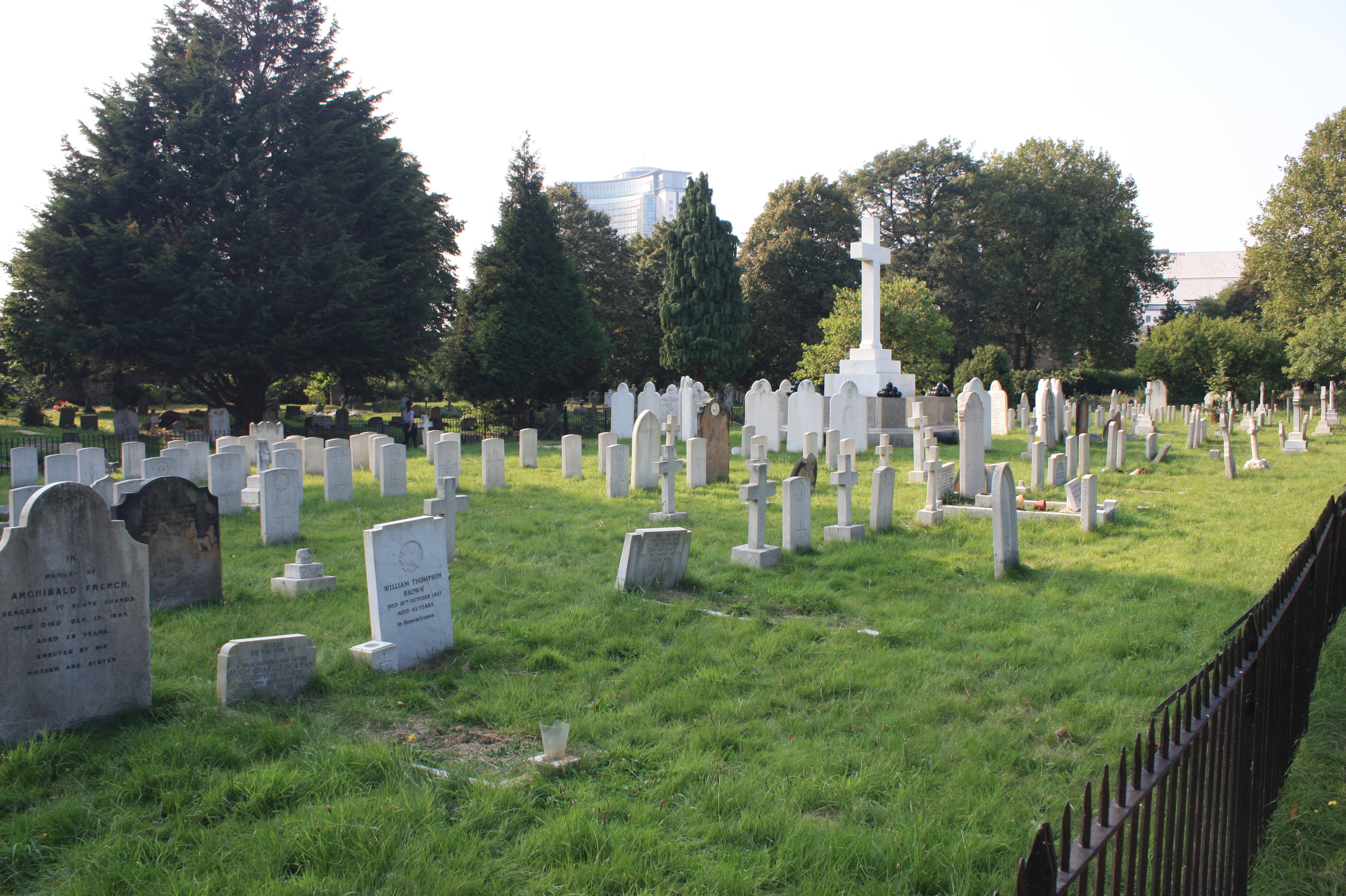
The military section, Brompton Cemetery

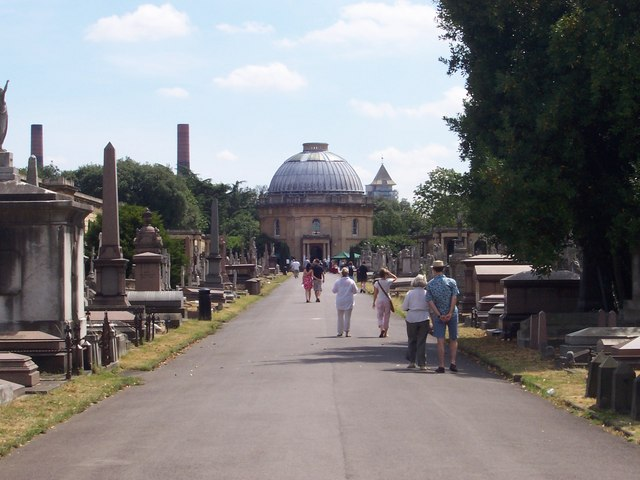
Main avenue

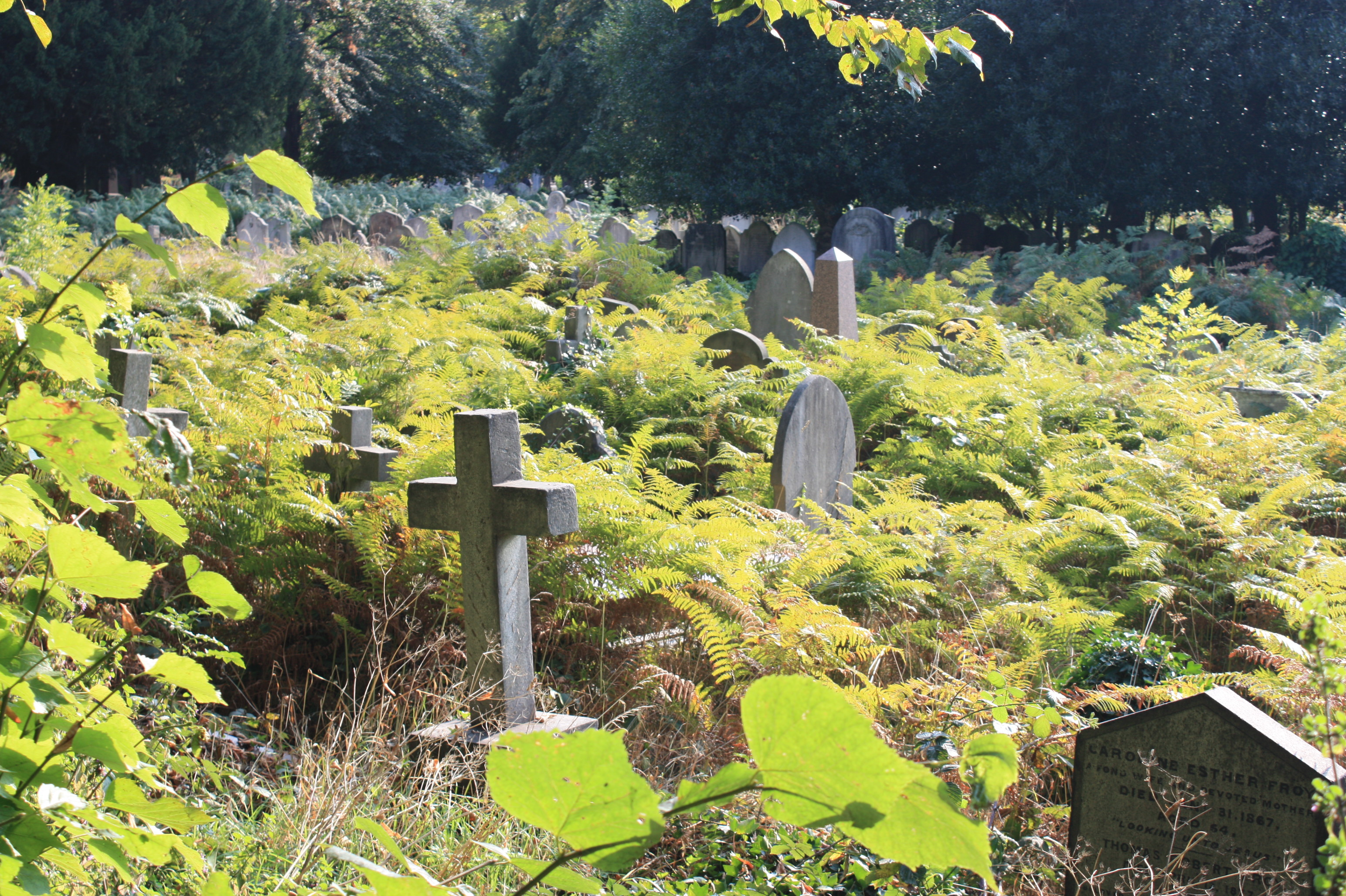
Outer east section, Brompton Cemetery

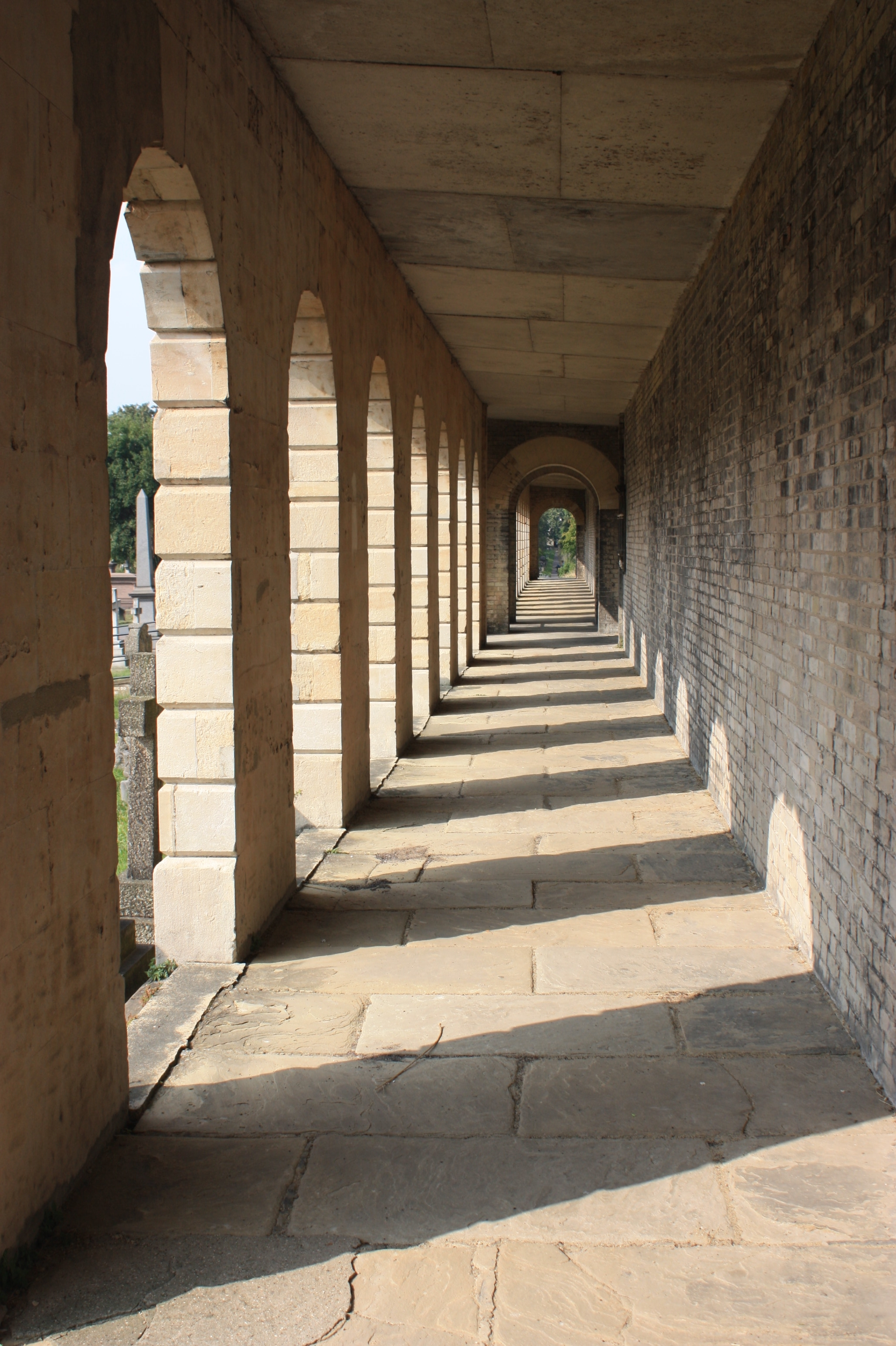
Colonnade, Brompton Cemetery, London

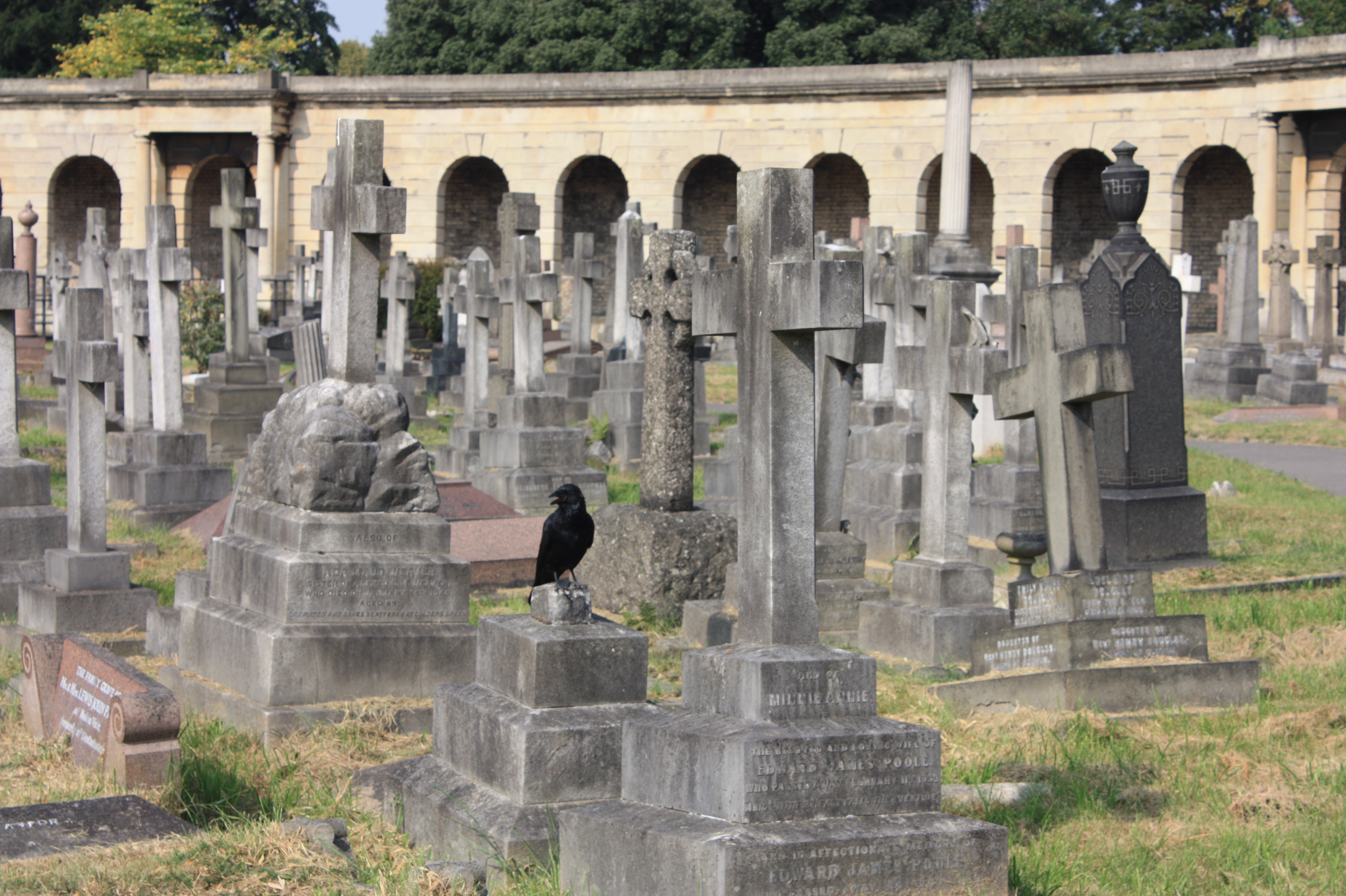
Central roundel, Brompton Cemetery

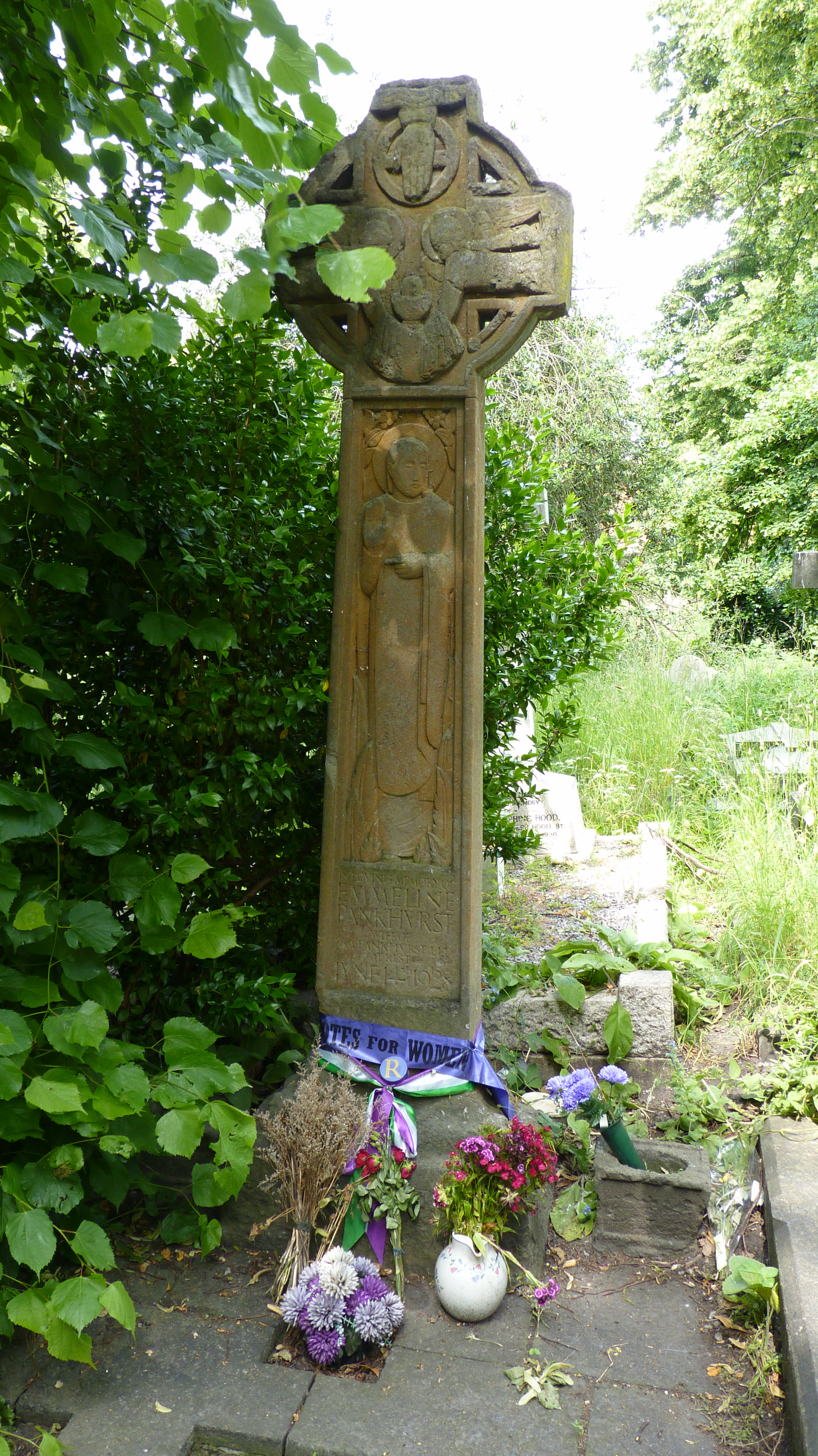
Emmeline Pankhurst's grave

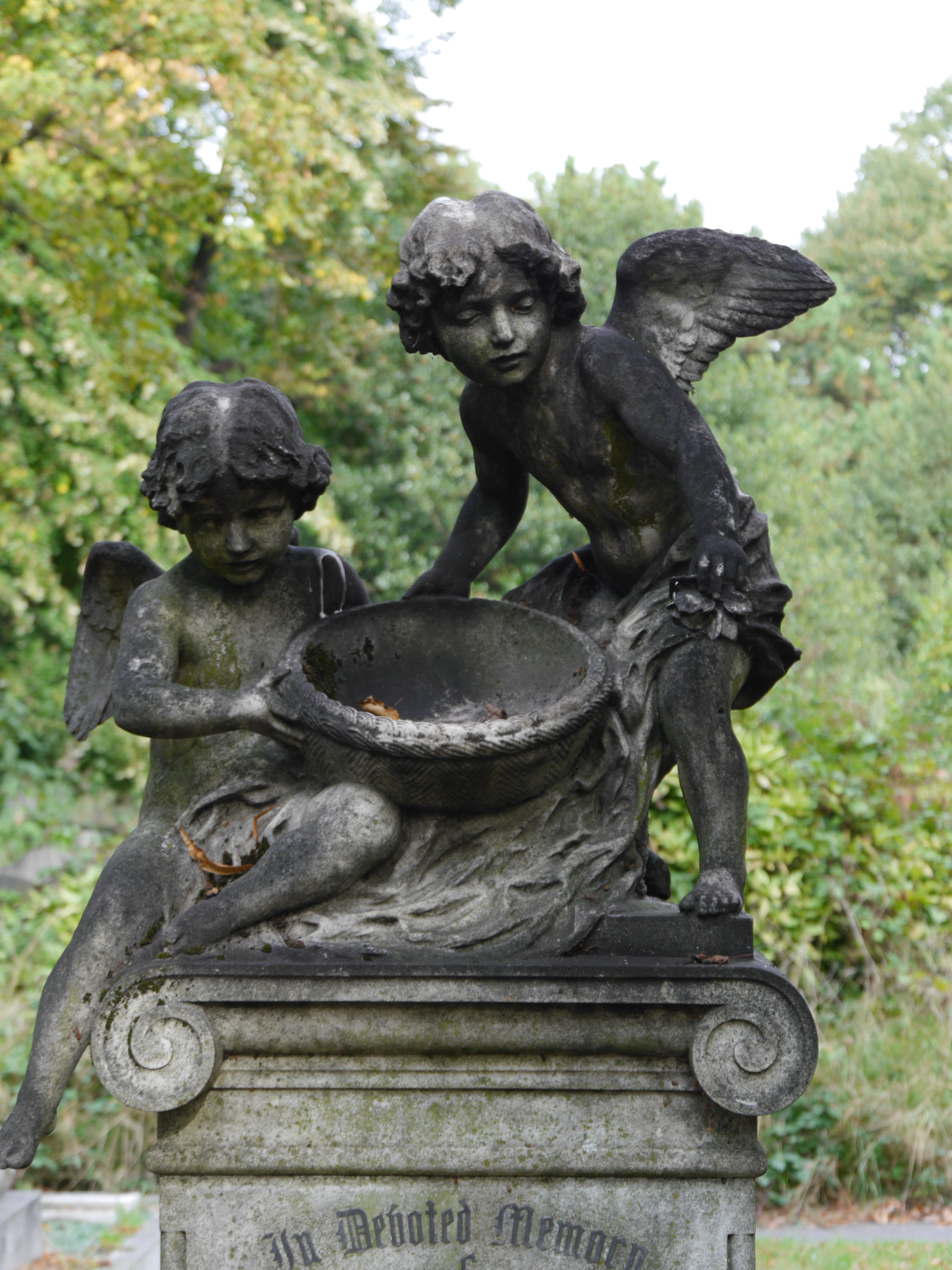
Angels, Brompton Cemetery

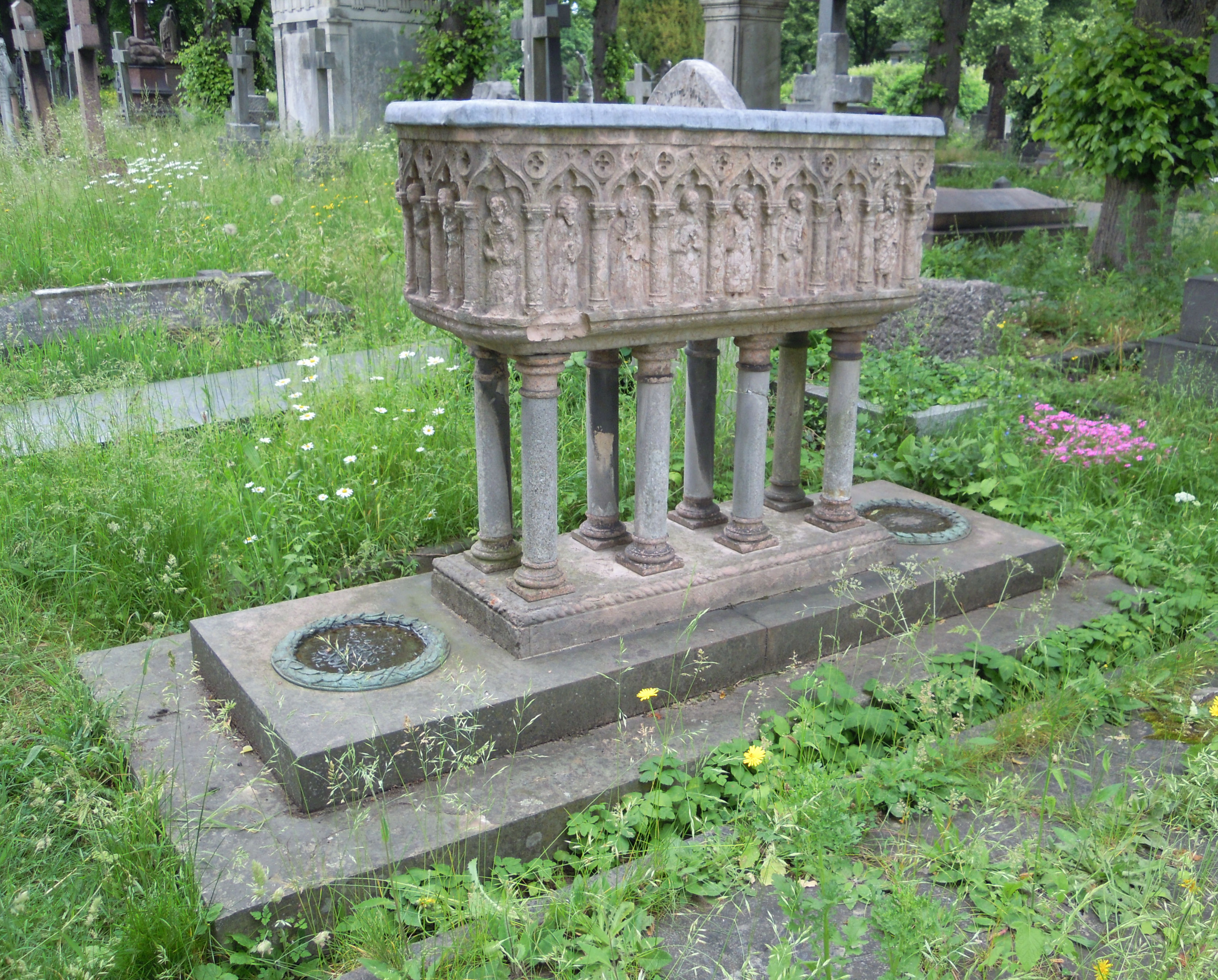
Monument of Valentine Cameron Prinsep

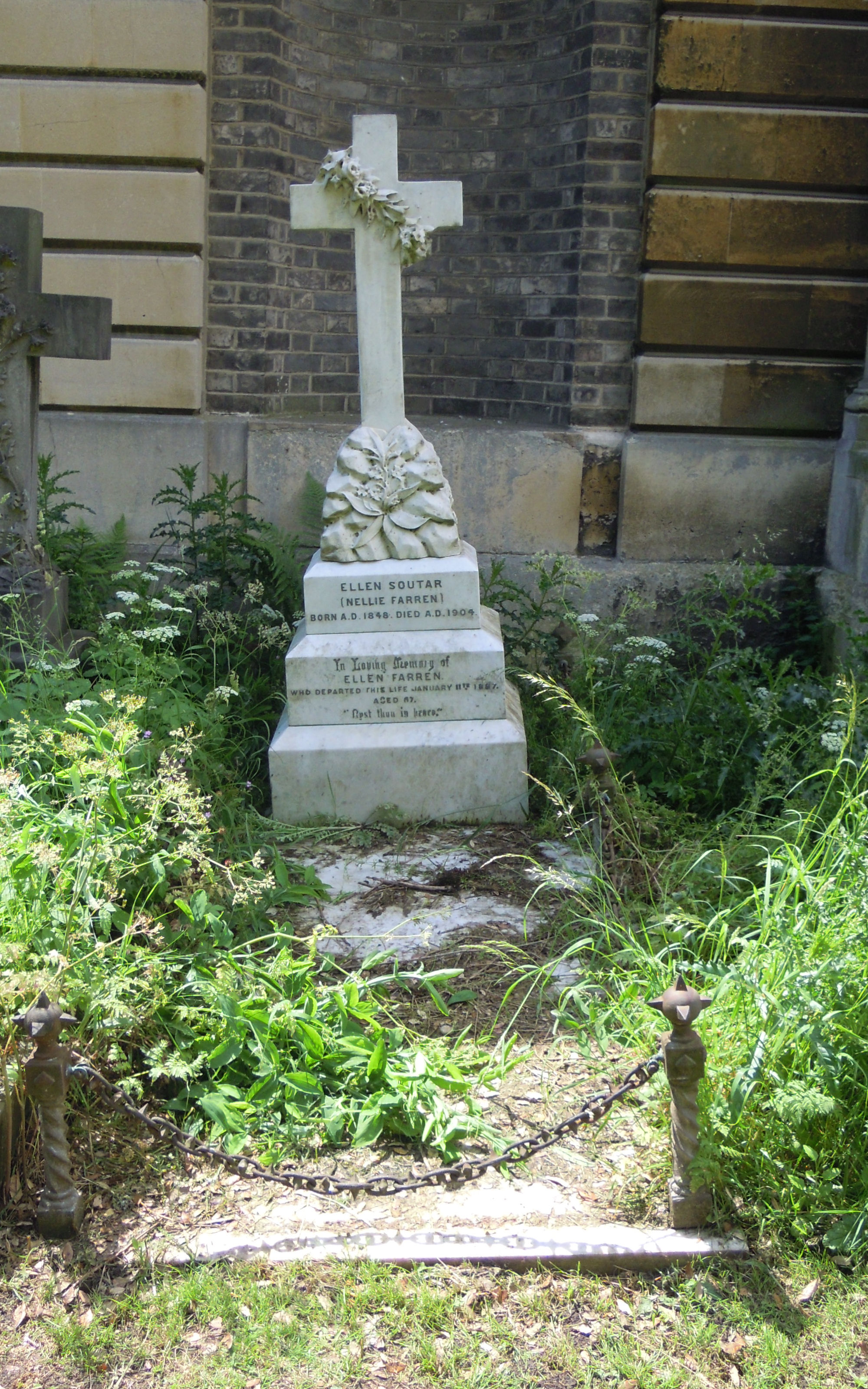
Grave of Nellie Farren

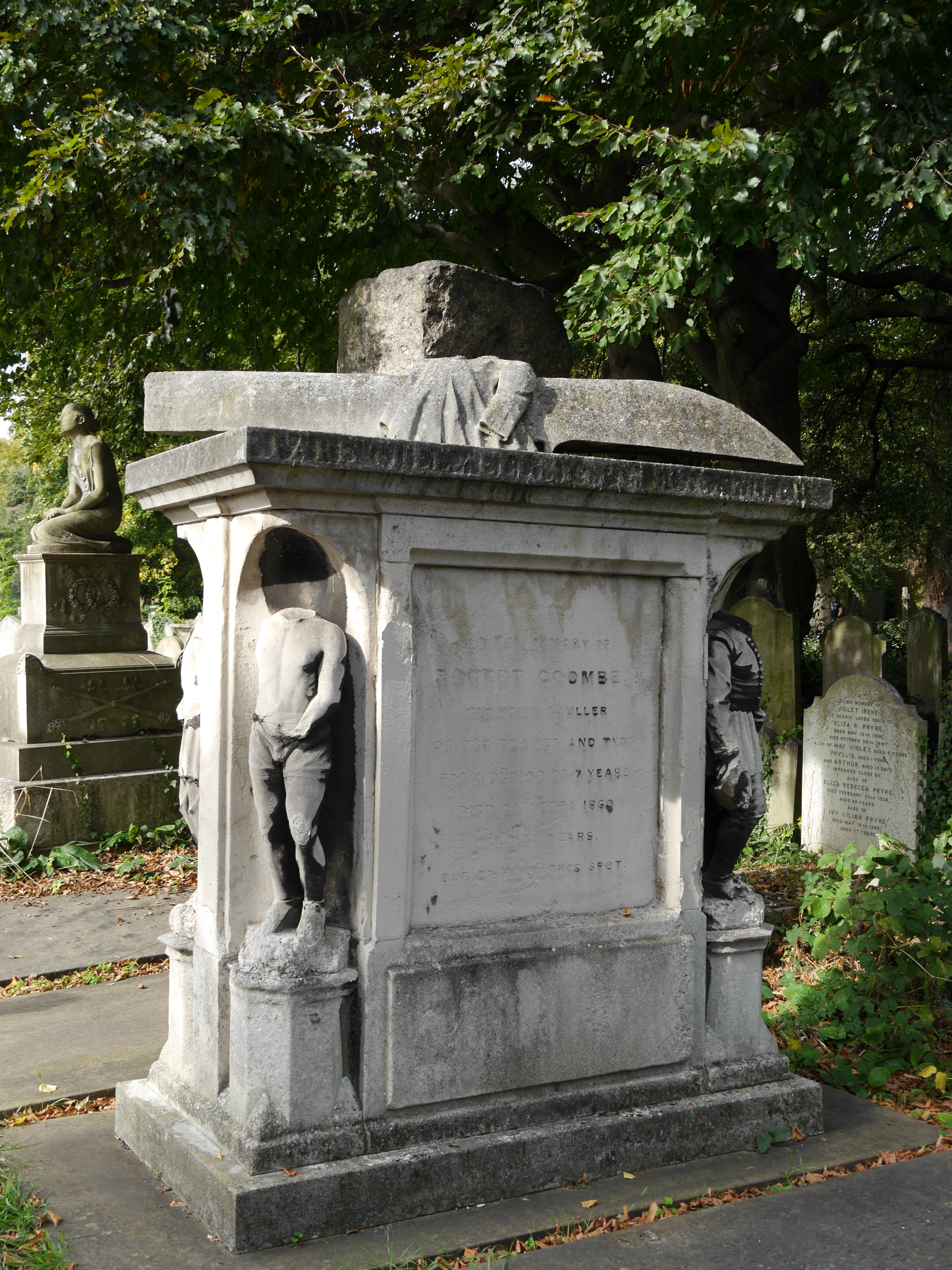
Robert Coombes monument

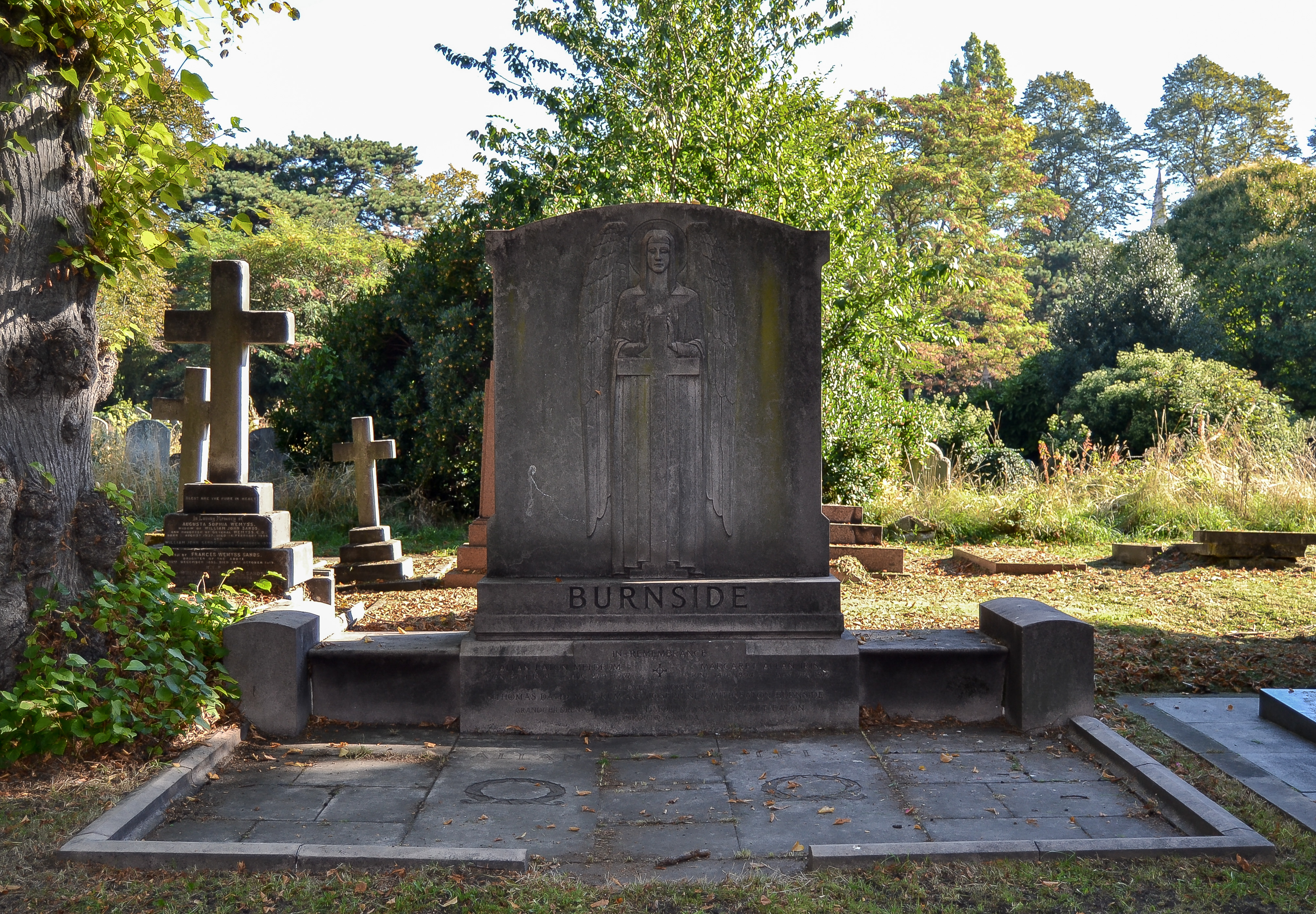
Burnside Monument

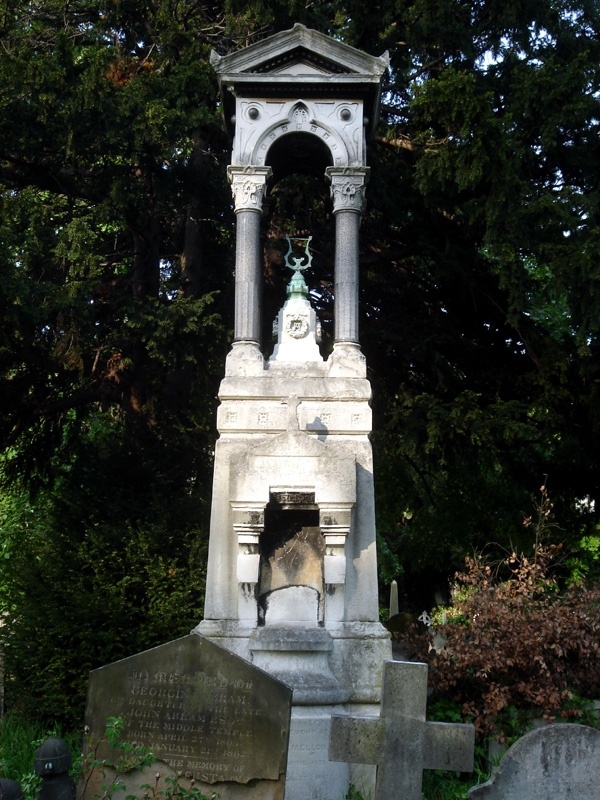
Alfred Mellon monument

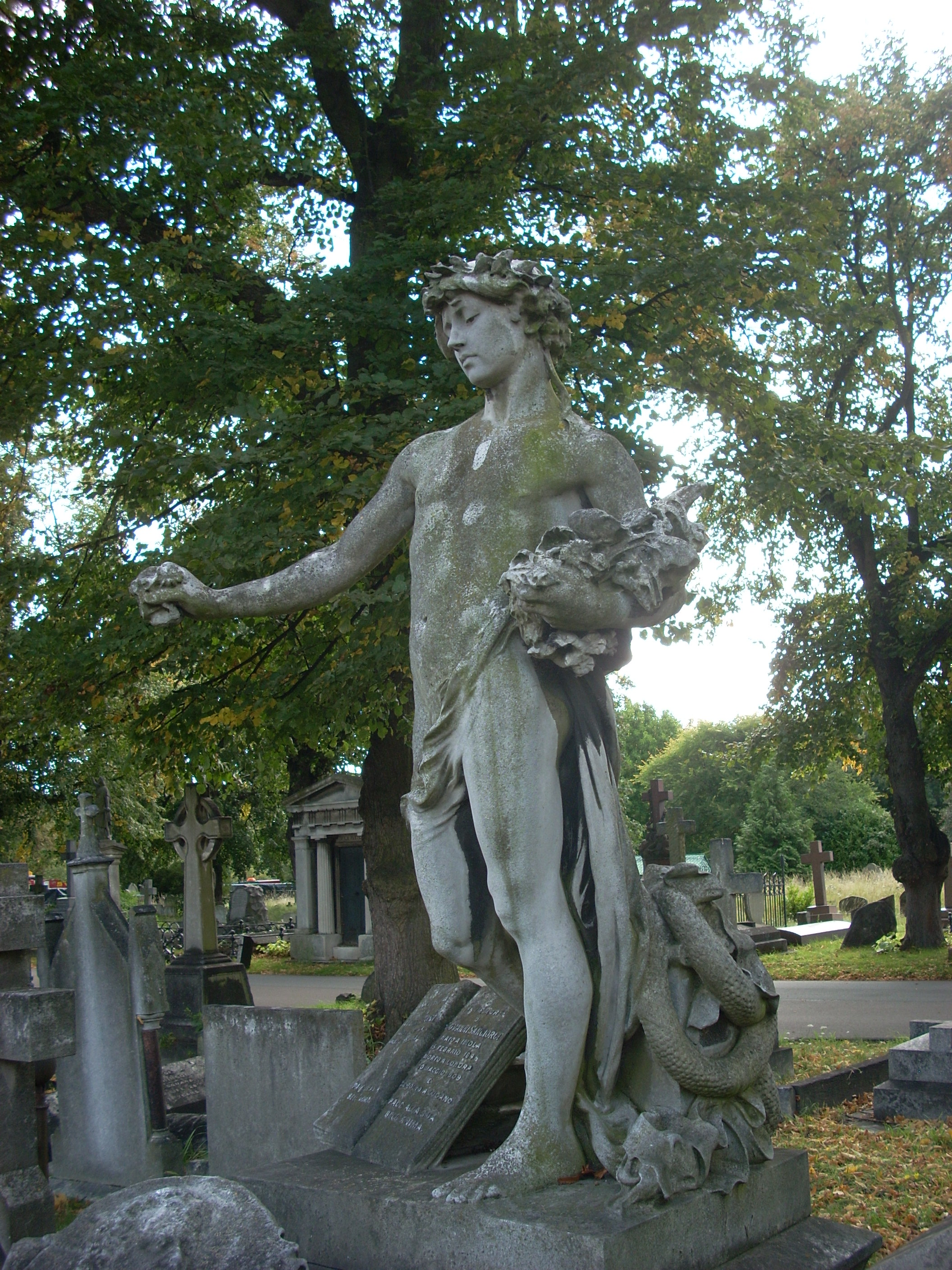
Barbe Sangiorgi monument

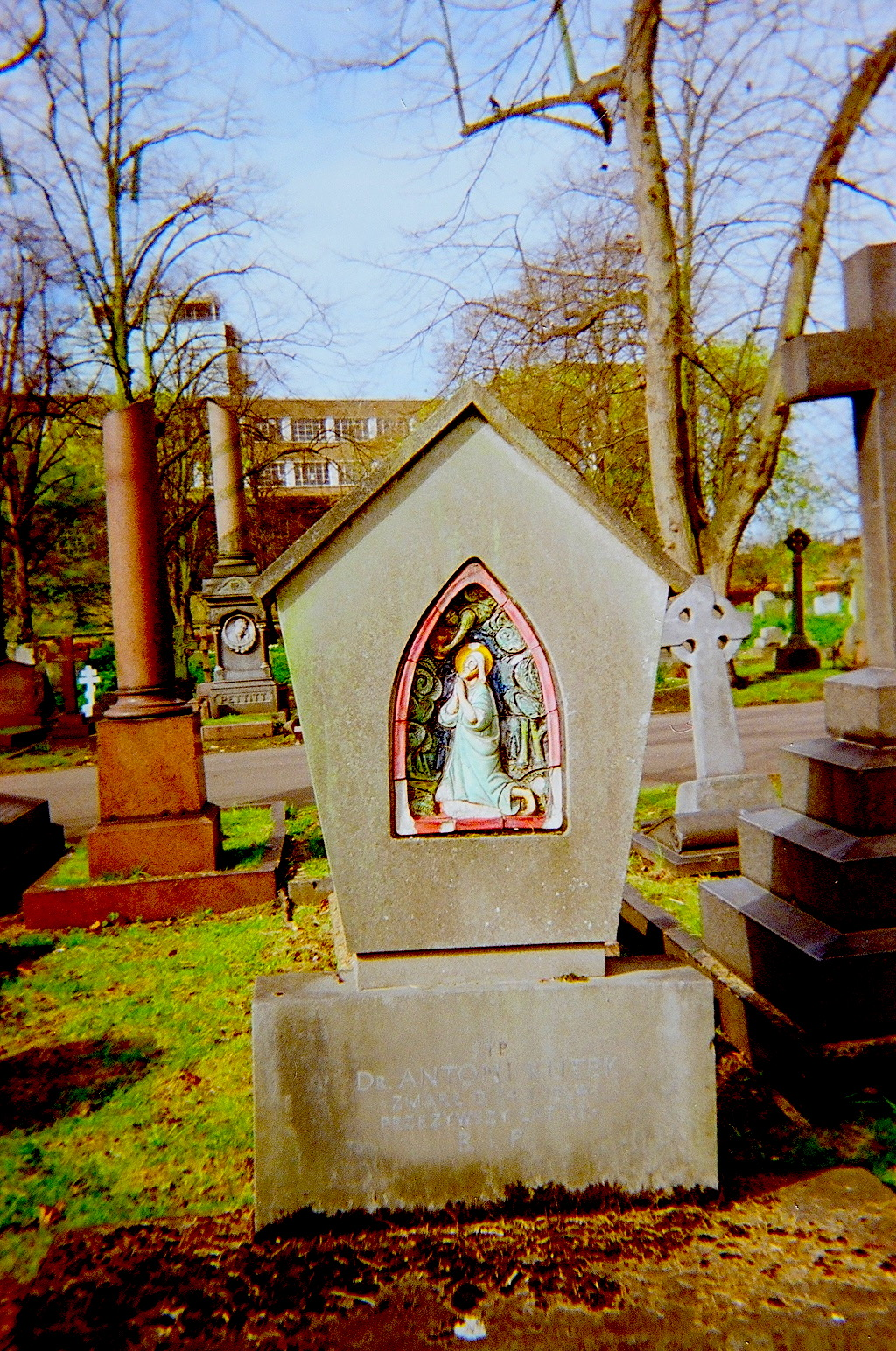
Grave of Dr. Antoni Kutek by Mieczysław Lubelski 1954

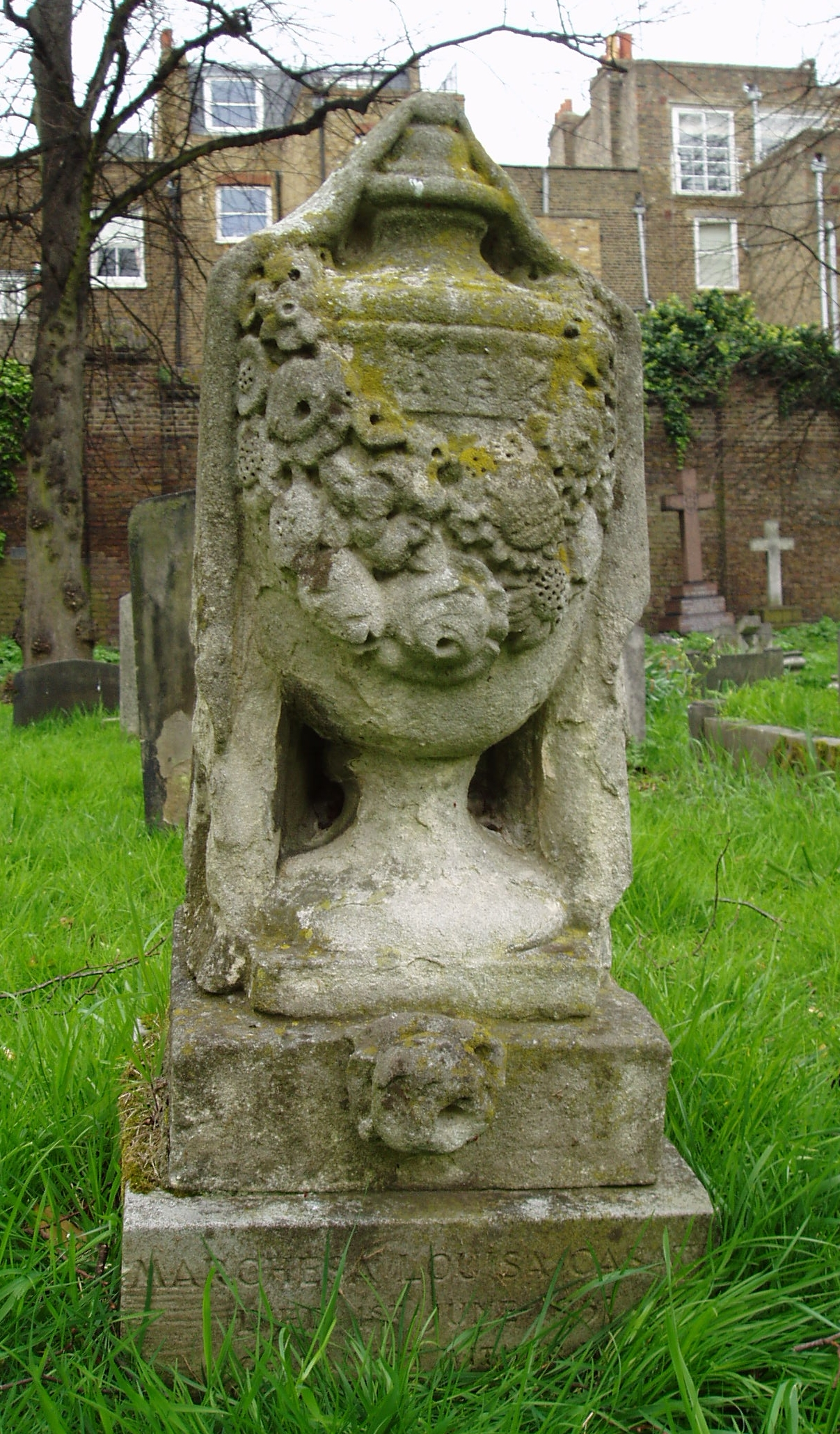
Marchesa Casati grave

By the early years of the 19th century, inner city burial grounds, mostly churchyards, had long been unable to cope with the number of burials and were seen as a hazard to health and an undignified way to treat the dead. The West of London and Westminster Cemetery Company Act 1837 (7 Will. 4 & 1 Vict. c. cxxx) authorised the laying out of a new burial ground in Brompton, London. The moving spirit behind the project was the architect and engineer, Stephen Geary, and it was necessary to form a company in order to get parliamentary permission to raise capital for the purpose. Geary was appointed as architect but was later forced to resign. Securing the land – some 40 acres – from local landowner, Lord Kensington and the Equitable Gas Light Company, as well as raising the money proved an extended challenge. The cemetery became one of seven large, new cemeteries founded by private companies in the mid-19th century (sometimes called the 'Magnificent Seven') forming a ring around the edge of London.

The site, previously market gardens, was bought with the intervention of John Gunter of Fulham, and was 39 acres (160,000 m^{2}) in area. Brompton Cemetery was eventually designed by architect, Benjamin Bauda. At its centre is a modest sandstone domed chapel dated 1839; at its southern end, are two symmetrical long colonnades, now all Grade II* listed, in the style of St. Peter's Square in Rome, and flanked by catacombs. It was intended to give the feel of a large open air cathedral. It is rectangular in shape with the north end pointing to the northwest and the south end to the southeast. It has a central "nave" which runs from Old Brompton Road towards the central colonnade and chapel. During a 4-year restoration project that began in 2014, an original Victorian flooring with Bath and York stone radial pattern was uncovered underneath the chapel carpet.

Below the colonnades are catacombs which were originally conceived as a cheaper alternative burial to having a plot in the grounds of the cemetery. Unfortunately, the catacombs were not a success and only about 500 of the many thousands of places in them were sold. The Metropolitan Interments Act 1850 (13 & 14 Vict. c. 52) gave the government powers to purchase commercial cemeteries. The shareholders of the cemetery company were relieved to be able to sell their shares as the cost of building the cemetery had overrun and they had seen little return on their investment and there were few burials at first.

During World War II the cemetery suffered bomb damage.

== Heritage status ==
As a site, the cemetery is listed Grade I in the English Heritage Register of Parks and Gardens of Special Historic Interest in England. The chapel and each arcade quadrant is separately listed as Grade II*. Frederick Richards Leyland's is the only Grade II* listed funerary monument. Several other individual monuments are listed Grade II. They include:

- Tomb of Peter Borthwick and family
- Burnside Monument (to Iris Burnside drowned on SS Lusitania)
- Chelsea Pensioners Monument
- Tomb of Clement Family
- Tomb of Robert Coombes
- Tomb of Percy E. Lambert
- Mausoleum of Harvey Lewis
- Mausoleum of James McDonald
- Tomb of Alfred Mellon
- Tomb of Barbe Marie Therese Sangiorgi (wife of Soho restaurateur August Kettner)
- Tomb of Samuel Leigh Sotheby

In all there are up to forty items associated with the cemetery which have a Historic England listing, including gates and telephone kiosks.

== Burials ==
Brompton was closed to burials between 1952 and 1996, except for family and Polish interments, of which there are over 300. In the 21st century it is once again a working cemetery, with plots for interments and a 'Garden of Remembrance' for the deposit of cremated remains. Many nationalities and faiths from across the world are represented in the cemetery.

=== Military graves ===
From 1854 to 1939, Brompton Cemetery became the London District's Military Cemetery. The Royal Hospital Chelsea purchased a plot in the north west corner where they have a monument in the form of an obelisk; the Brigade of the Guards has its own section south of that. There are 289 Commonwealth service personnel of World War I and 79 of World War II, whose graves are registered and maintained by the Commonwealth War Graves Commission. A number of veterans are listed in the Notable Interments. Although the majority of war graves are in the dedicated railed section to the west – also containing 19th century services graves – a number of servicemen's graves are scattered in other areas. Besides the British there are many notable Czechoslovak, Polish and Russian military burials.

=== Notable interments ===
- Alexander Anderson – Royal Marines general
- Tomasz Arciszewski – Polish socialist politician and Prime Minister of Poland in exile
- Sir Frederick Arthur – army officer
- James Atkinson – surgeon, artist and Persian scholar
- Acton Smee Ayrton – Lawyer and Liberal Member of Parliament for Tower Hamlets 1857–74
- William Edward Ayrton – physicist
- Sir Squire Bancroft – actor and theatre impresario
- William Banting – undertaker and low-carbohydrate diet advocate
- Thomas Wilson Barnes – British Chess player
- Metropolitan Anthony (Bloom) of Sourozh – Russian Orthodox émigré Metropolitan archbishop, medical doctor and author
- Joseph Bonomi the Younger – sculptor, artist, Egyptologist and museum curator
- George Borrow – author, traveller and linguist
- Peter Borthwick – politician
- Sir Leslie Brass – lawyer and civil servant
- Fanny Brawne – John Keats' muse, buried under her married name, Frances Lindon
- Stanley Brett – actor
- Sir James Browne – engineer
- Francis Trevelyan Buckland – zoologist
- Field Marshal John Fox Burgoyne and his son, Hugh Burgoyne RN – Victoria Cross recipient
- Henry James Byron – actor and dramatist
- General William Martin Cafe – Indian Mutiny hero and Victoria Cross recipient
- Sir William Wellington Cairns – Australian administrator after whom the city of Cairns is named
- Sir Duncan Cameron – British Army general
- Louis Campbell-Johnston (1861–1929) – founder of the British Humane Association
- Marchesa Luisa Casati – infamous Italian quaintrelle, muse, eccentric and patron of the arts
- John Graham Chambers – founder of the Amateur Athletic Association
- F. B. Chatterton – theatre manager
- Thomas Chenery – editor of The Times (1877–84)
- Hugh Childers – Liberal statesman
- Henry Chorley – literary, painting and music critic, writer and editor
- Campbell Clarke – journalist and author
- Joseph Thomas Clover – pioneer of anaesthesia
- Charles Coborn – music hall singer and comedian
- Hiram Codd – inventor of the Codd bottle
- Henry Cole – founder of the Victoria and Albert Museum, the Royal Albert Hall, the Royal College of Music, the 1851 Great Exhibition and inventor of the Christmas card
- Robert Collier, 1st Baron Monkswell – Lord Monkswell, Privy Councillor, Attorney General for England and Wales, QC, politician and judge and his wife Isabella Rose
- Charles Allston Collins – Pre-Raphaelite painter and brother of the novelist Wilkie Collins
- Thomas Cooke – sailor who fought under Nelson, later turned actor
- Robert Coombes – champion professional sculler
- Sydney Cotton – British Army officer and governor of the Royal Hospital Chelsea
- Thomas Crofton Croker – Irish antiquary, devoted to the collection of Irish poetry and folklore
- William Crookes – chemist and physicist
- Samuel Cunard – founder of the Cunard Line
- Thomas Cundy III – architect
- Thomas Cundy (junior) – master builder
- Thomas Cundy (senior) – architect
- Agnes de Selincourt – missionary and academic
- Sir James Bevan Edwards – army officer
- General Sir William Henry Elliott – army officer
- Corporal Joseph John Farmer – VC recipient
- Nellie Farren – stage actress
- Henry Farrer – artist
- Terence Feely – playwright and author
- Captain Alfred Kirke Ffrench – VC recipient of Indian Mutiny
- Walter Forbes, 18th Lord Forbes
- Eleanor Fortescue-Brickdale – painter and stained glass designer
- Robert Fortune – botanist who introduced tea plant from China to India
- Sir John Fowler, 1st Baronet – railway engineer
- Tom Foy – comedian
- Lieutenant-General Sir Charles Craufurd Fraser – VC recipient
- Sir Charles James Freake – untrained architect and builder, creator of much of South Kensington
- Admiral Charles Fremantle – explorer, founded the Swan River Colony (Western Australia) and the city of Fremantle which bears his name
- Princes George and Emanuel Galitzine – film producer and Spitfire pilot
- Brian Glover (1934–1997) – television and film actor
- John William Godward – painter
- George Godwin – architect, journalist, and editor of The Builder magazine
- George Goldie – "founded" Nigeria
- Dr Benjamin Golding – founder of Charing Cross Hospital
- Maude Goodman – artist, buried under her married name, Matilda Scanes
- Lucy Gordon – actress
- General Sir Charles Gore
- John Gunter – landowner, secured the south entrance to the cemetery
- Field Marshall Frederick Haines
- Arthur Haliburton, 1st Baron Haliburton, British civil servant
- Corporal Thomas Hancock – VC recipient (unmarked grave)
- James Duffield Harding – landscape painter, lithographer and author
- Sir Augustus Harris – actor
- John Harrison – Royal Navy VC recipient
- Thomas Helmore – choirmaster and author of books on plainsong
- Admiral Algernon Heneage
- Ian Hetherington – video game pioneer
- Tim Hetherington – photojournalist
- Rowley Hill – Bishop of Sodor
- Francis Edwin Hodge - Artist
- Sir Harold Hood, 2nd Baronet
- Colonel William Hope – VC recipient
- Jean Ingelow – poet and novelist
- John Jackson – boxer
- Geraldine Jewsbury – writer
- Mary Anne Keeley – actress
- Robert Keeley – actor and comedian
- William Claude Kirby – first chairman of Chelsea Football Club
- J. P. Knight – Inventor of the first traffic light
- Dr. Antoni Kutek – wartime medical officer of the MS Batory. His grave is by Mieczysław Lubelski
- Constant Lambert – composer and conductor
- Kit Lambert – music producer and original manager of The Who
- Percy E. Lambert – racing car driver
- Nat Langham – middleweight bare-knuckle boxing champion from 1843 to 1853
- John Leslie-Melville, 9th Earl of Leven
- Sir Edward Letchworth – prominent Freemason
- Frederick Richards Leyland – shipowner and art collector
- Bernard Levin – journalist, author and broadcaster
- Sir John Scott Lillie – Peninsular War veteran, local landowner, inventor and social reformer
- Ralph Robert Wheeler Lingen, 1st Baron Lingen (1819–1905)
- Johann Carl Ludwig Loeffler – manager of Siemens Brothers
- Marie Lohr – actress
- Archibald Low – inventor and author of science books
- David Lyon MP West Indies merchant, landowner and client of Decimus Burton
- Wiktor Łomidze – Georgian-Polish Naval officer
- James McDonald – president of the Anglo-American Oil Company
- Henry McGee (1929–2006) – actor
- John Benjamin Macneill – railway engineer
- Jean Marsh (1934–2025) – actress (ashes buried here)
- George Heming Mason – painter
- General Sir Frederick Francis Maude – VC recipient
- Henry Augustus Mears – founder of Chelsea Football Club
- Alfred Mellon – violinist and composer
- Boyd Merriman, 1st Baron Merriman (1880–1962)
- Lionel Monckton – composer of Edwardian musical comedies
- Lieutenant-Colonel Hugh Montgomery – Royal Marines and intelligence officer, one of the IRA-assassinated Cairo Gang
- Henrietta Moraes – writer, artist's model and muse to Francis Bacon
- Roderick Murchison – geologist, originator of the Silurian system
- Adelaide Neilson – actress
- William Gustavus Nicholson, 1st Baron Nicholson – first Chief of the Imperial General Staff
- Matthew Noble – sculptor
- Count Stanisław Julian Ostroróg – Crimean War veteran, photographer to the Queen
- Eugène Oudin – American baritone
- Sydney Owenson, Lady Morgan – Anglo-Irish writer
- Fanny Bury Palliser – mother of eight children, historian and writer on lace
- Sir William Palliser – inventor and builder of Barons Court
- Emmeline Pankhurst – leading suffragette
- Private Samuel Parkes – VC recipient
- Mrs Howard Paul – actress and singer
- Charles Henry Pearson and his brother Sir John Pearson
- Sir John Lysaght Pennefather – general
- Henry Pettitt – actor, a noteworthy monument with a sculpted head of Pettitt
- John Birnie Philip – sculptor and father in law of the artist James Whistler
- Eliza Phillips - co-founder of the RSPB
- Percy Sinclair Pilcher – inventor and pioneering aviator
- Valentine Cameron Prinsep – Pre-Raphaelite painter
- Sir Robert Rawlinson – military officer
- William Henry Macleod Read – political and social activist and merchant
- Fanny Ronalds – American socialite and singer
- William Michael Rooke – Irish composer
- John Henry Mole - British painter
- Blanche Roosevelt – American opera singer and author
- Tim Rose – American singer-songwriter
- Alexander Rotinoff – architect
- William Howard Russell – journalist and war correspondent
- Sir Doyle Money Shaw – naval officer
- William Siborne – Army officer and military historian, maker of the Siborne model
- Samuel Smiles – biographer and inventor of "self-help"
- Albert Richard Smith – writer
- John Snow – anaesthetist and epidemiologist, who demonstrated the link between cholera and infected water
- Farren Soutar – musical comedy actor
- Lord Alan Spencer-Churchill – officer 8th Hussars
- General The Hon. Sir Augustus Almeric Spencer GCB – officer
- Charles Stent – dentist after whom the medical Stent is named
- H.F. Stephens – light railway pioneer
- Robert Story – poet
- Fred Sullivan, Thomas Sullivan and Mary Clementina Sullivan – brother, father and mother of Arthur Sullivan, composer
- Jerzy Swirski – vice-admiral and head of the Polish navy, 1925–1947
- Richard Tauber – operatic tenor
- Sir David Tennant – Speaker of the Cape Parliament.
- William Terriss – actor
- Ernest Thesiger – character actor, The Old Dark House and Bride of Frankenstein
- Frederic Thesiger, 1st Baron Chelmsford – jurist and statesman
- Frederic Augustus Thesiger, 2nd Baron Chelmsford – Commander-in-Chief in the Zulu War
- John Evan Thomas – sculptor
- Brandon Thomas – author of Charley's Aunt
- Stefan Tyszkiewicz – engineer, inventor, car manufacturer, political activist
- Charles Blacker Vignoles – railway engineer, and inventor of the Vignoles rail
- Fred Vokes – actor and dancer
- Jessie Vokes – actress and dancer
- Victoria Vokes – actress
- Colonel Richard Wadeson – VC recipient
- Edward Wadsworth – artist
- Thomas Attwood Walmisley – composer and organist.
- Sir Robert Warburton – Anglo-Indian soldier and administrator
- Jane Wardle – clinical psychologist and pioneer of cancer prevention
- Flight Sub Lieutenant Reginald Alexander John Warneford – VC recipient
- Sir Philip Watts – naval architect, designer of the Elswick cruiser and HMS Dreadnought
- Sir Andrew Scott Waugh – army officer and surveyor, who named the highest mountain in the world after Sir George Everest
- Benjamin Nottingham Webster – actor, theatre manager and playwright
- Sir Thomas Spencer Wells – surgeon to Queen Victoria, medical professor and president of the Royal College of Surgeons of England
- Private Francis Wheatley – Crimean War veteran, VC recipient
- Jack Whitley – professional footballer
- Sir William Fenwick Williams – general, pasha and governor
- John Wisden – cricketer and founder of Wisden Cricketers' Almanack
- John Lewis Wolfe – architect, artist and stockbroker
- Bennet Woodcroft – textile manufacturer, industrial archaeologist, pioneer of marine propulsion, patent reformer and first clerk to the Patent Commissioners
- Thomas Wright – antiquarian and writer
- General William Wylde (1788–1877) Colonel Commandant of the Royal Artillery
- Johannes Zukertort aka Jan Hermann Zukertort – Polish-Jewish chess master

It was originally planned that Sir Arthur Sullivan of Gilbert and Sullivan fame would also be buried there with his family, until Queen Victoria insisted on his interment in St Paul's Cathedral.

=== Exhumations ===
In the late 1880s when the nearby Earl's Court Exhibition Grounds played host to the American Show with Buffalo Bill, a number of Native American performers in the show, died while on tour in Britain. The Sioux chief, Long Wolf, a veteran of the Oglala Sioux wars was buried here on 13 June 1892 having died age 59 of bronchial pneumonia. He shared the grave with a 17-month-old Sioux girl named White Star believed to have fallen from her mother's arms while on horseback. A British woman, Elizabeth Knight, traced his family 105 years later and campaigned with them to have his remains returned to the land of his birth. In 1997, Chief Long Wolf was finally moved to a new plot at Wolf Creek Cemetery (ancestral burial ground of the Oglala Sioux tribe) in Pine Ridge, South Dakota.

His great-grandson John Black Feather said "Back then, they had burials at sea, they did ask his wife if she wanted to take him home and she figured that as soon as they hit the water they would throw him overboard, so that's why they left him here."

There was a Brulé Sioux tribesman buried in Brompton named Paul Eagle Star. His plot was in the same section as Oglala Sioux warrior Surrounded By the Enemy who died in 1887 from a lung infection at age 22. Like Long Wolf, he took part in Buffalo Bill's Wild West show. Paul died a few days after breaking his ankle when he fell off a horse in August 1891. His casket was exhumed in spring of 1999 by his grandchildren, Moses and Lucy Eagle Star. The reburial took place in Rosebud's Lakota cemetery.

Little Chief and Good Robe's 18-month-old son, Red Penny, who travelled in Buffalo Bill's Wild West is also buried here. His specific resting place within the cemetery is not known.

Two notable Polish figures originally buried in Brompton Cemetery were reburied in Powazki Cemetery, Warsaw:

- General Michał Karaszewicz-Tokarzewski – founder of a Polish resistance unit in World War II and war hero, who died in Casablanca on 22 May 1964. The urn containing his ashes was reburied at Powazki in September 1992.
- Major General Felicjan Sławoj Składkowski – prime minister of Poland before outbreak of the Second World War, who died in London in August 1962, was reburied at Powazki on 8 June 1990.

Two other exhumations involved Polish bishops of the Polish Orthodox Church:

- Sawa, Jerzy Jewgieniewicz Sowietow, rus. Георгий Евгеньевич Советов – Gieorgij Jewgienjewicz Sowietow, (1898 in St Petersburg – 1951 in London) – bishop of the Polish Autocephalous Orthodox Church and bishop in the Polish Armed Forces during World War II.
- Bishop Mateusz, Konstanty Siemaszko (1894 in Babice – 1985 in London) – bishop of the Polish Orthodox Church.

Both were re-buried at the Orthodox Cemetery, Warsaw on 31 December 2012.

== Funerary art ==
The richness of the art and symbolism contained in many graves traces art movements across two centuries. Aside from the stonemason's and sculptor's craft, there is a vast array of lettering, decorative ironwork (sadly in a very corroded state) and ceramics. Some graves and mausolea are the work of noted artists and architects.

== Flora and fauna ==
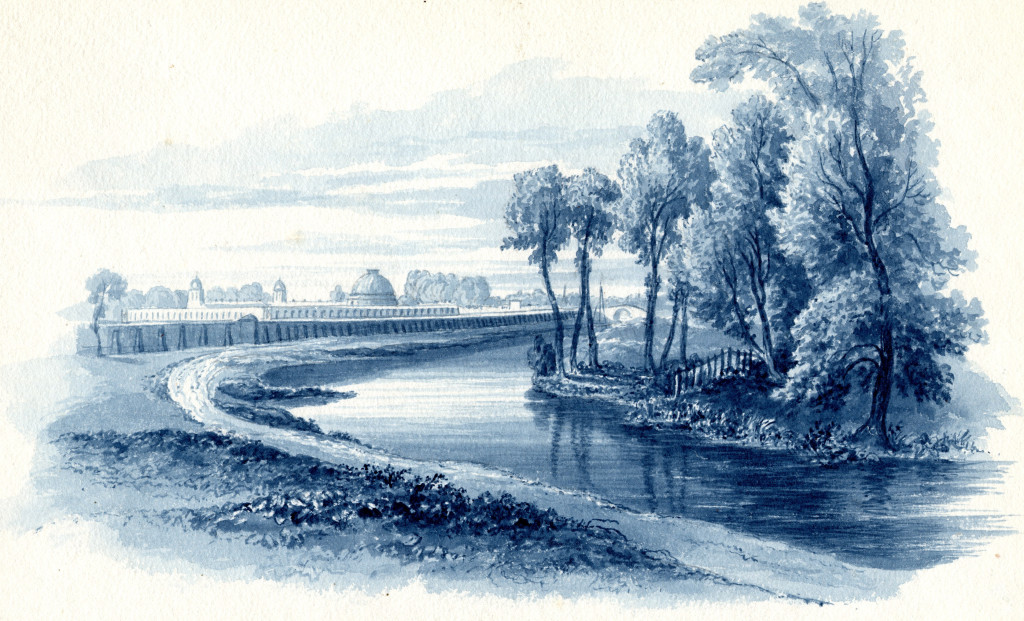
Brompton Cemetery with Kensington Canal by William Cowen

Although never envisaged as a park, JC Loudon devised the original planting scheme that was not fully realised, however, pines were imported from Poland with the prospect that in maturity they would cast shade over the graves. There are over 60 species of trees, of which the limes are dated to 1838. The fact of the enclosure of the cemetery by a wall, has preserved almost intact, a distinct area of Victorian country flora. The adjacent West London line afforded a green corridor for many years, enriched by ballast from the South Downs when Counter's Creek was filled in and two railway lines constructed in mid-19th century, although a small wetland area was preserved by West Brompton station. However recent redevelopment along the station has further reduced local biodiversity and further reductions are planned with the major redevelopment of nearby Earls Court Exhibition Centre.

In the cemetery each season brings its features, like snow-drops and bluebells or wild lupin and foxgloves, broad-leaf pea, ferns and horse tail. There are small scale wooded areas and meadows. Since the land was used for market gardens, there are wild cabbages, asparagus and garlic among the slabs. A grape vine has fallen victim to maintenance. In Autumn, there can be a display of fungi, a mycologist's trove. The evergreens and ivy are a haven for birds and countless insects. Over 200 species of moth and butterfly have been identified in the cemetery. Despite the absence of a permanent water feature, there have been sightings of amphibians, notably a toad. Mammals are represented by bats, a range of rodents, including grey squirrels and one or two families of foxes. Among the birds, there is a long-standing population of carrion crows and several garden species with the addition of green woodpeckers and occasionally, nesting kestrels and ring-necked parakeets. The appearance of a female ring-necked pheasant in 2012 was short-lived.

"Brompton Cemetery has been identified as a Site of Borough Importance for Nature Conservation (grade I) comprising moderately diverse grassland that contains at least three notable London species that support a diverse assemblage of invertebrates".

== Public access ==
The cemetery is open daily to the public throughout the year, with opening times varying with the seasons. It is regularly visited by the Parks Police Service to monitor and curb occurrences of anti-social behaviour. Dog walking and cycling, under strict control, is permitted on indicated paths. Through traffic is forbidden and there is no parking. Any visiting vehicles must observe a 5 mph limit. The byelaws are displayed on boards at both entrances. The Friends of Brompton Cemetery organise Open Days, regular tours and other public attractions.

The cemetery has a reputation for being a popular cruising ground for gay men.

== Beatrix Potter connection ==
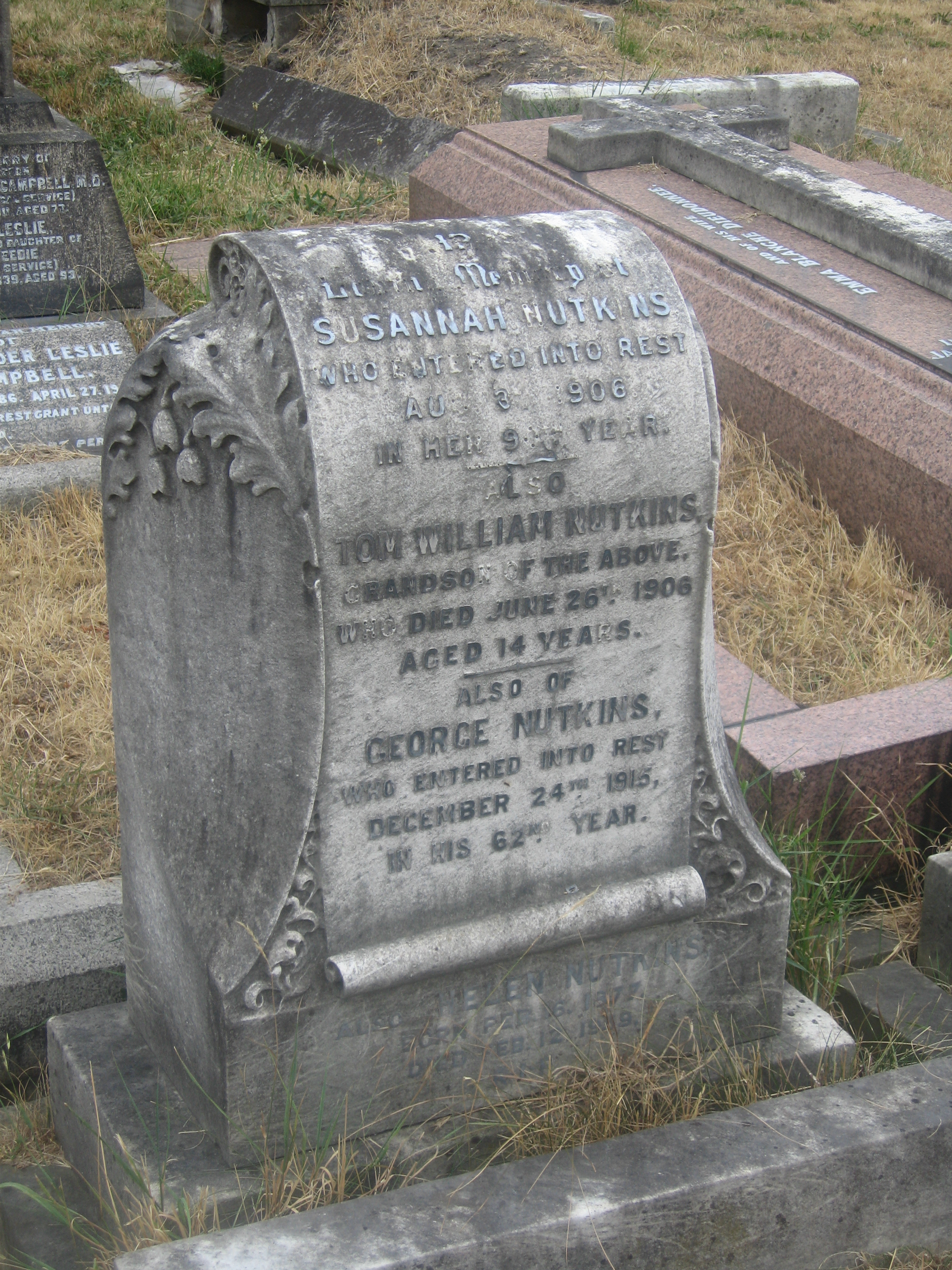
Nutkins gravestone

Beatrix Potter, who lived in Old Brompton Road nearby and enjoyed walking around it, may have taken the names of some of her characters from tombstones in the cemetery. Names of people buried there included Mr Nutkins, Mr McGregor, Mr Brock, Mr Tod, Jeremiah Fisher and even a Peter Rabbett, although it is not known for certain if there were tombstones with all these names.

== In film ==
Brompton Cemetery has featured in a number of films, including Sherlock Holmes (2009), as the exterior of a Russian church in Goldeneye, Stormbreaker, Johnny English, The Wings of the Dove, Eastern Promises and The Gentlemen.

== Gallery ==
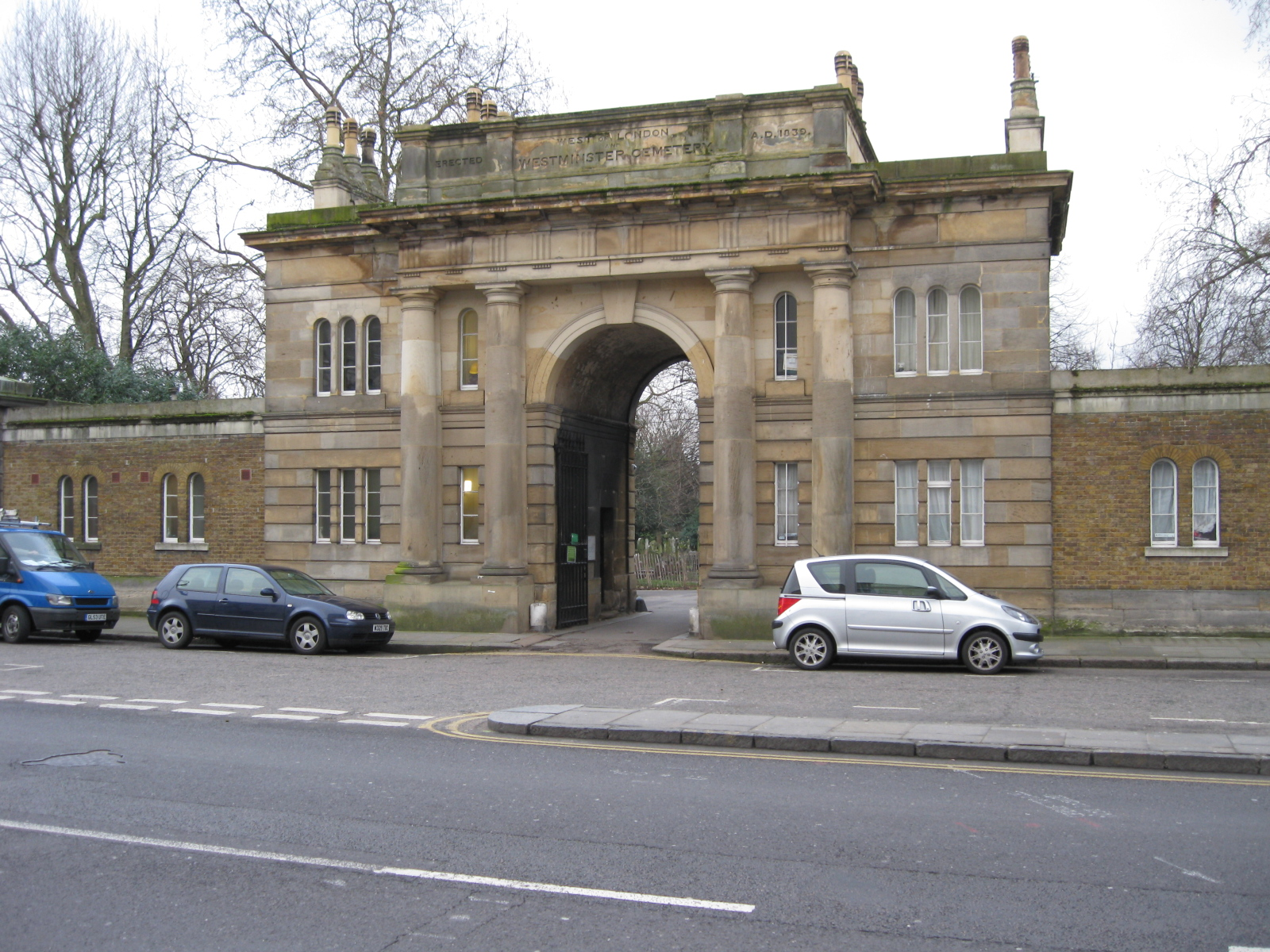
Old Brompton Road entrance

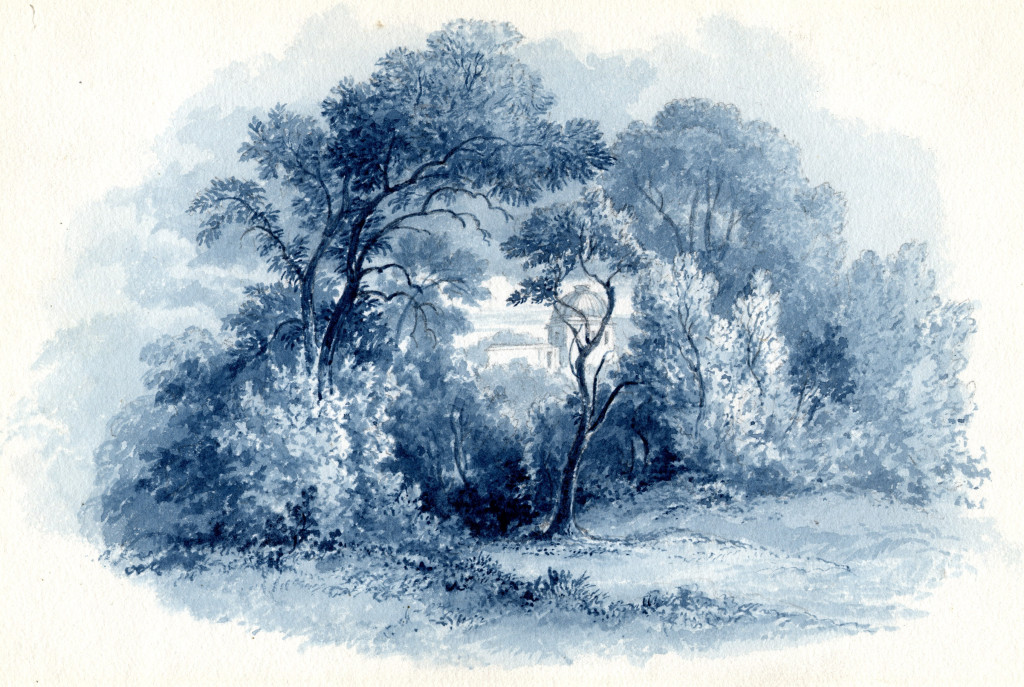
Brompton Cemetery by William Cowen (1791–1864) a Rotherham-born landscape painter

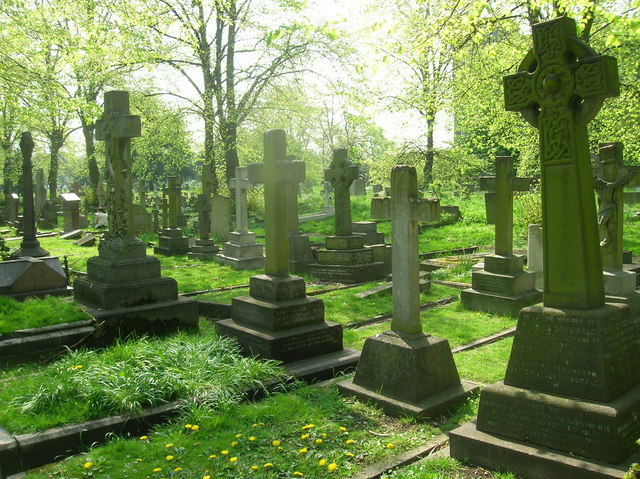
Among the gravestones

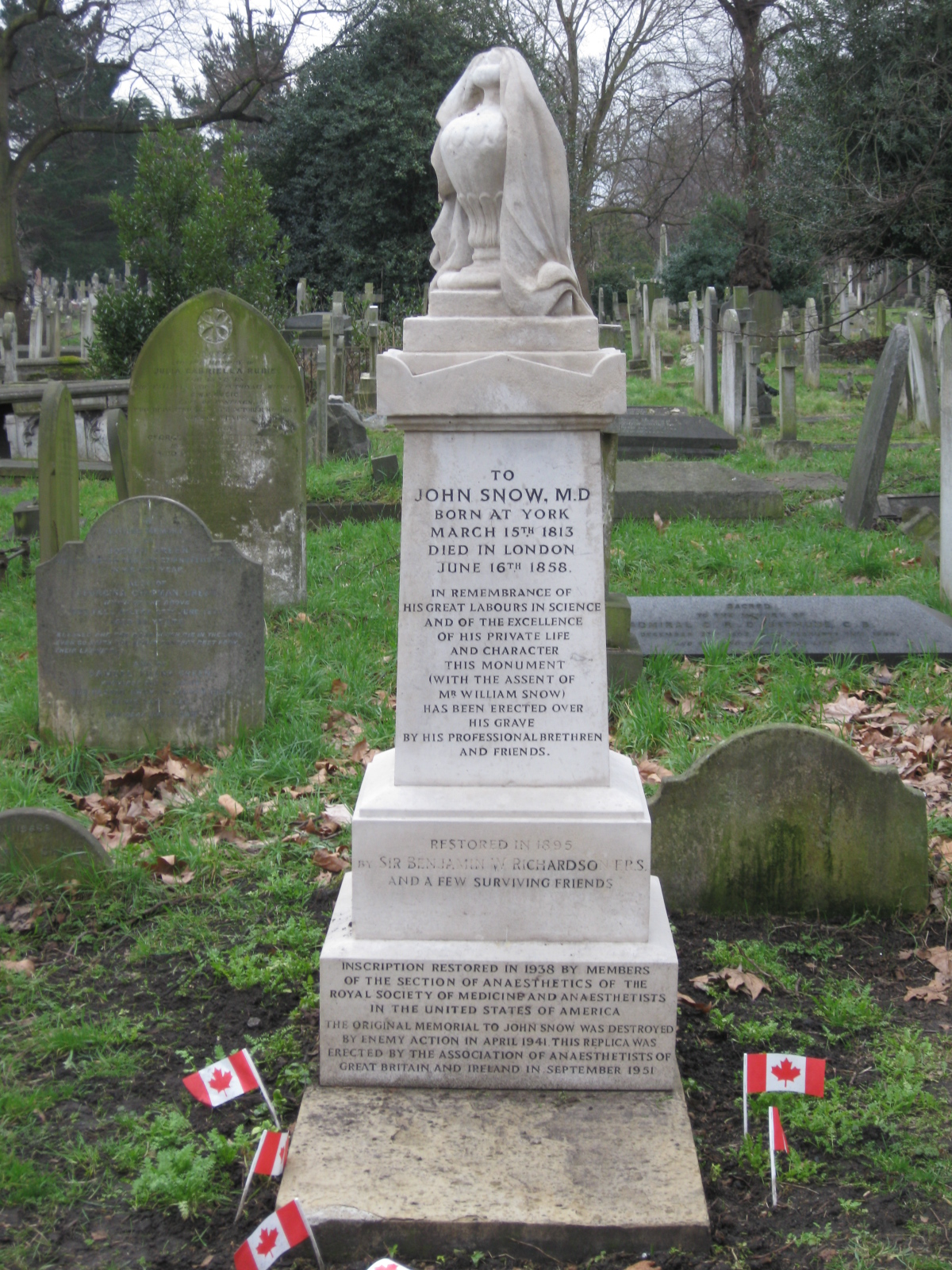
Monument to John Snow

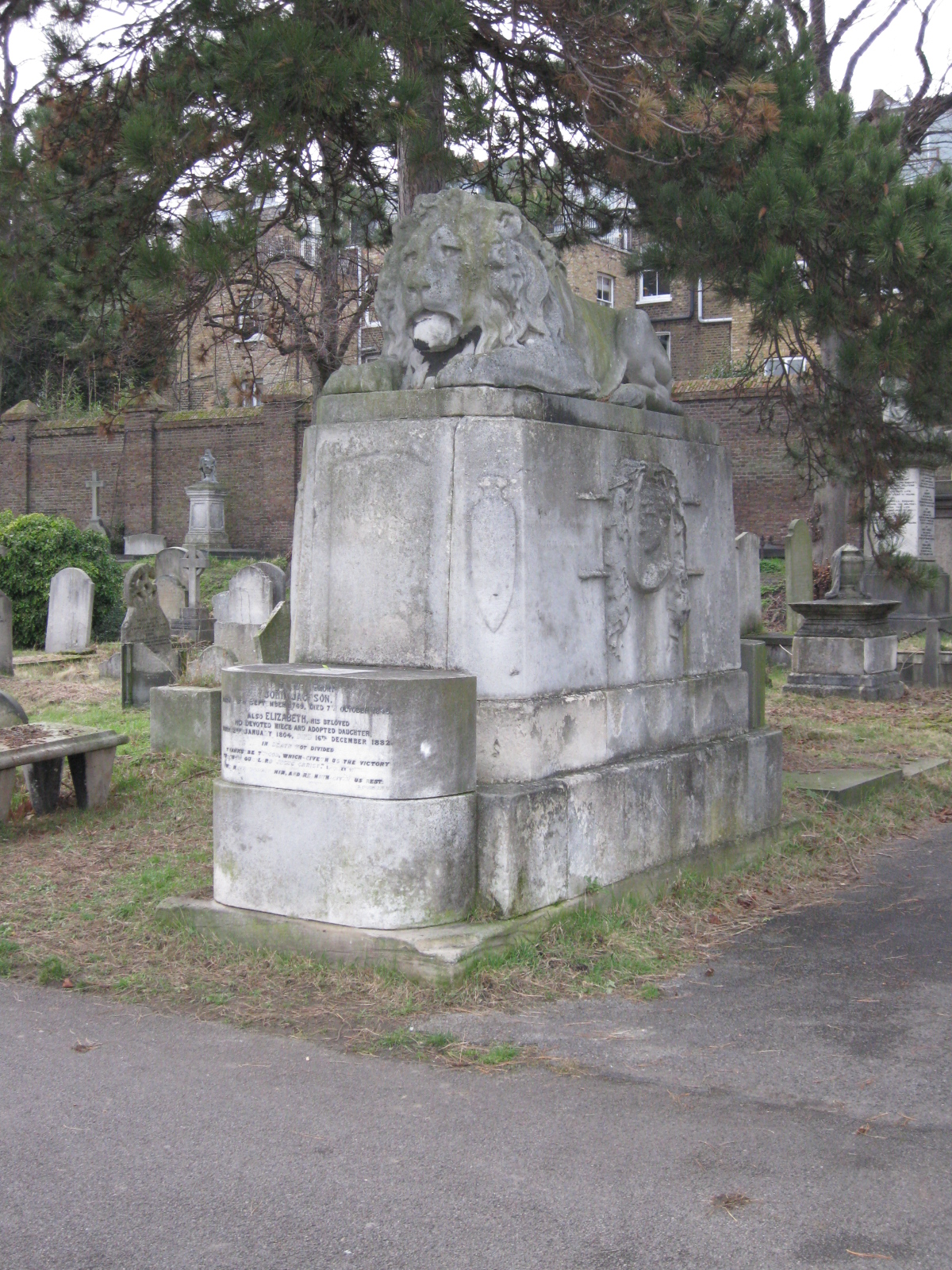
The lion on the grave of "Gentleman" John Jackson

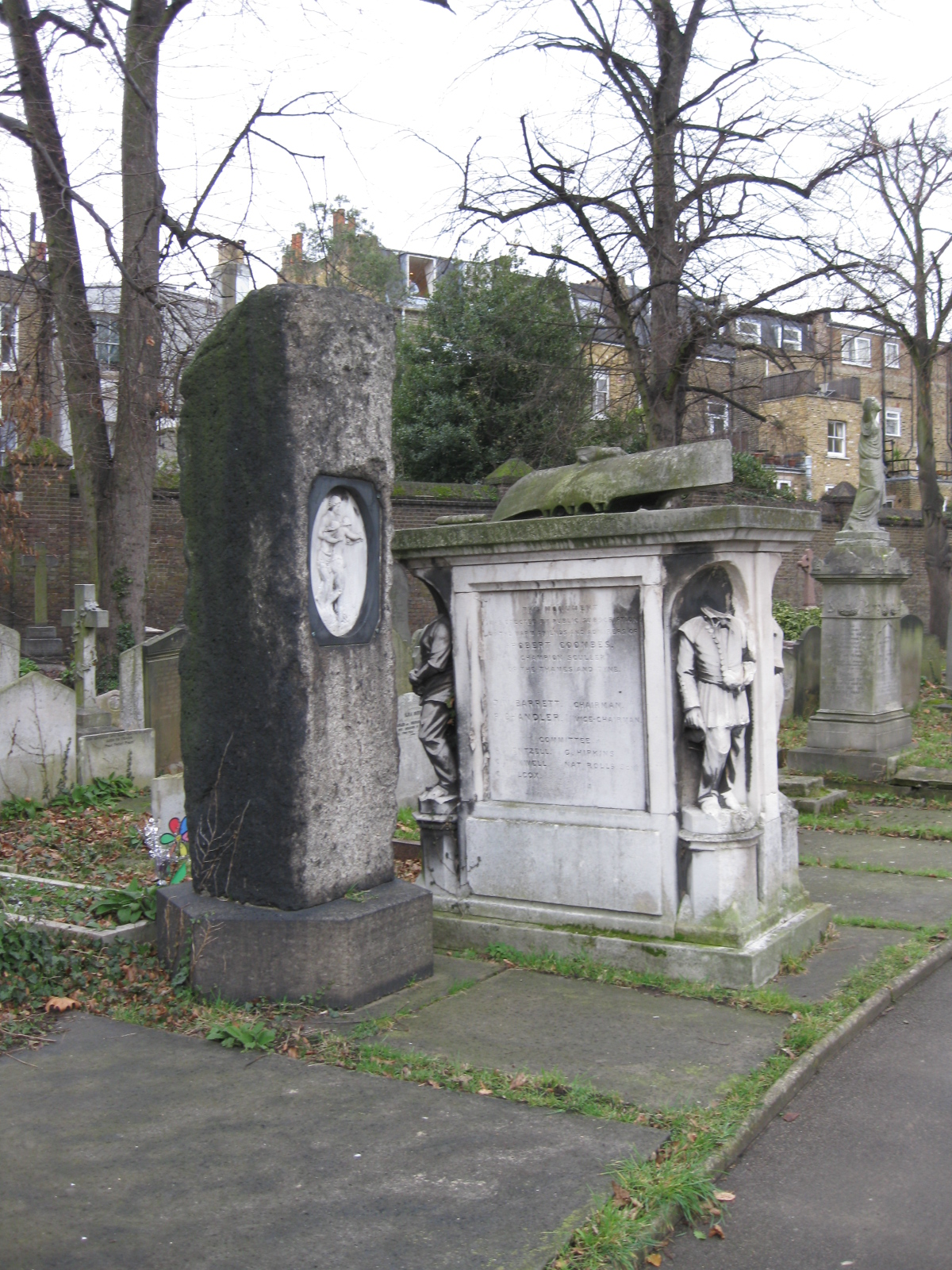
Monument to Robert Coombes (on the right, now sadly defaced)

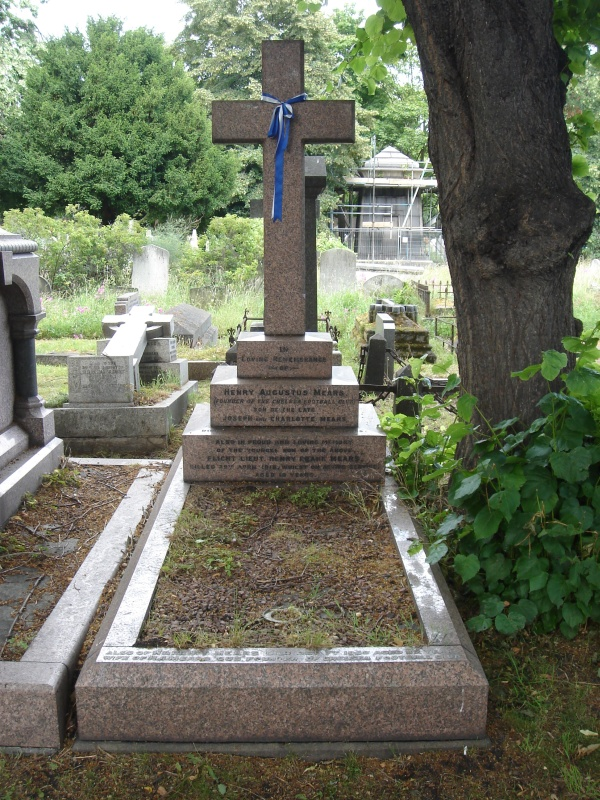
Grave of Gus Mears, founder of nearby Chelsea F.C.

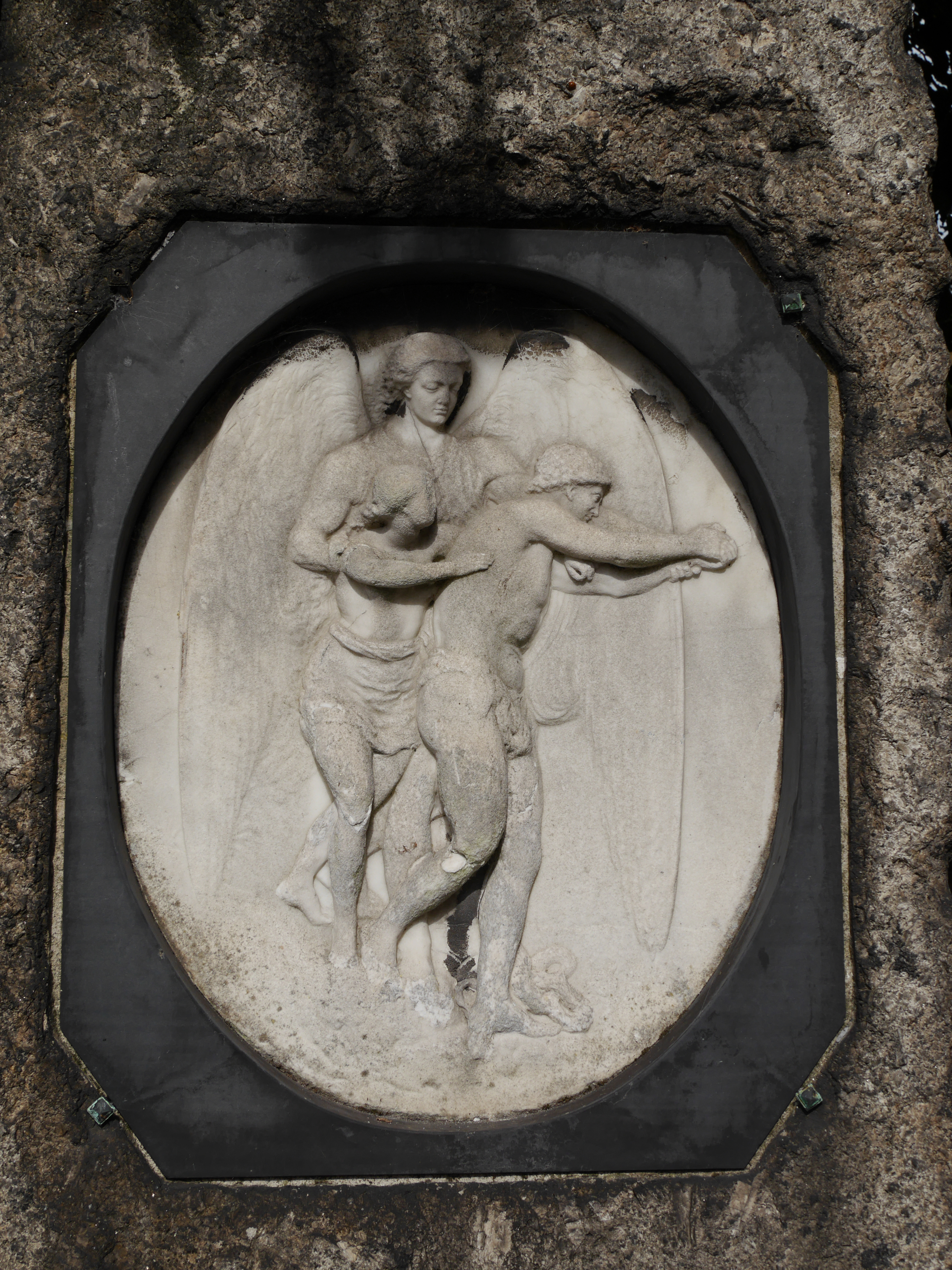
Brompton Cemetery bas-relief

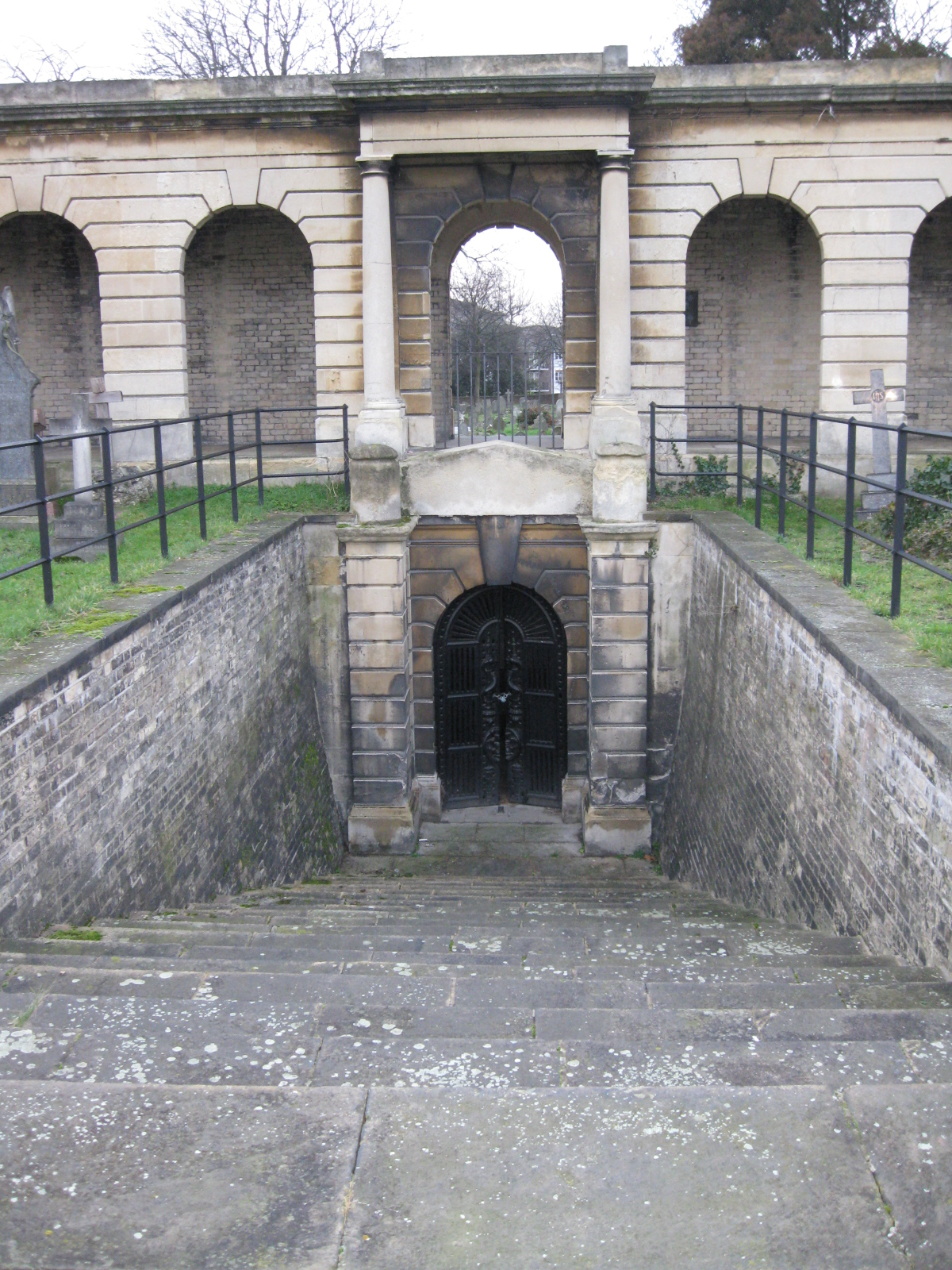
Entry to the catacombs

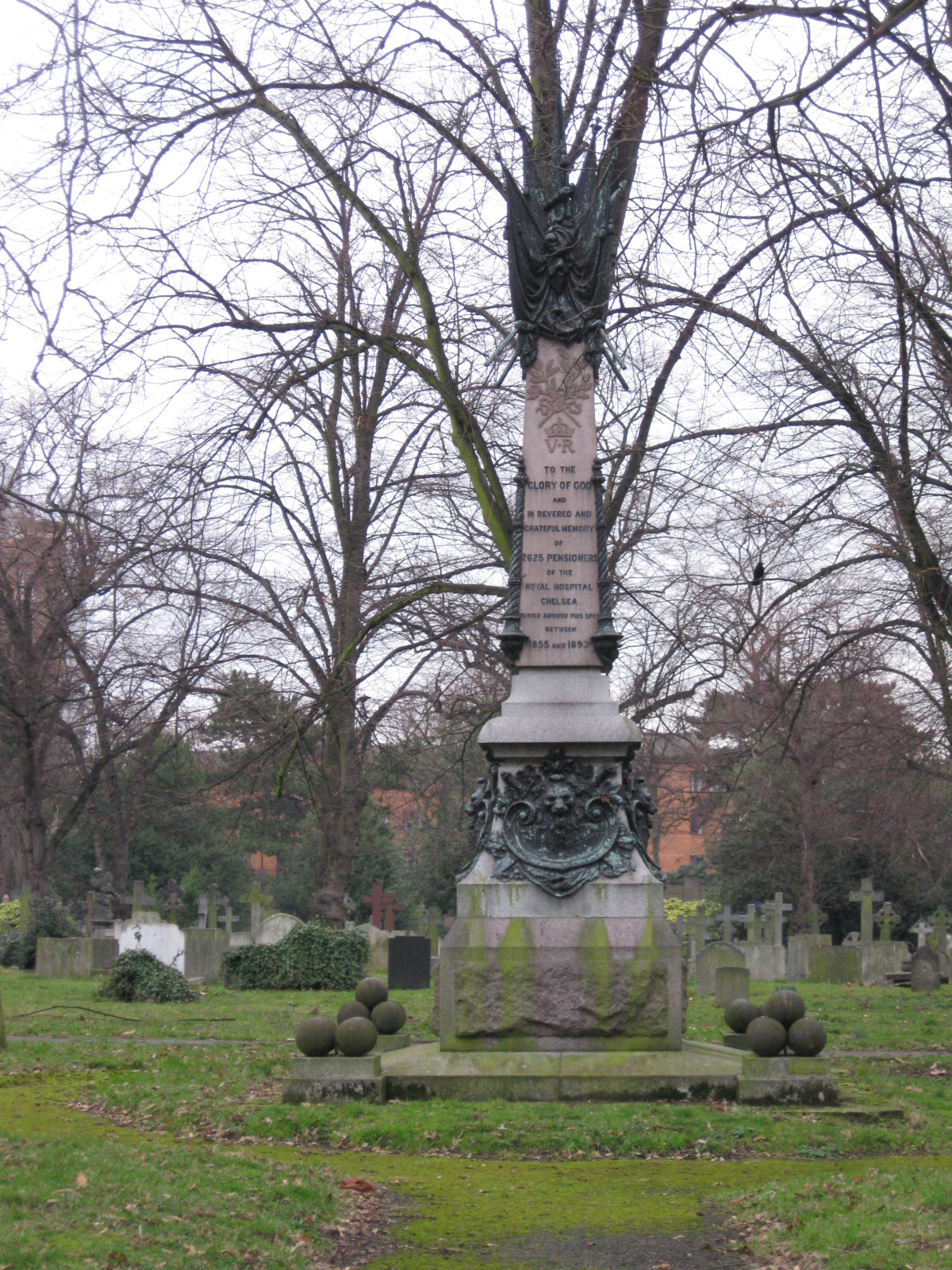
Chelsea Pensioners' Memorial

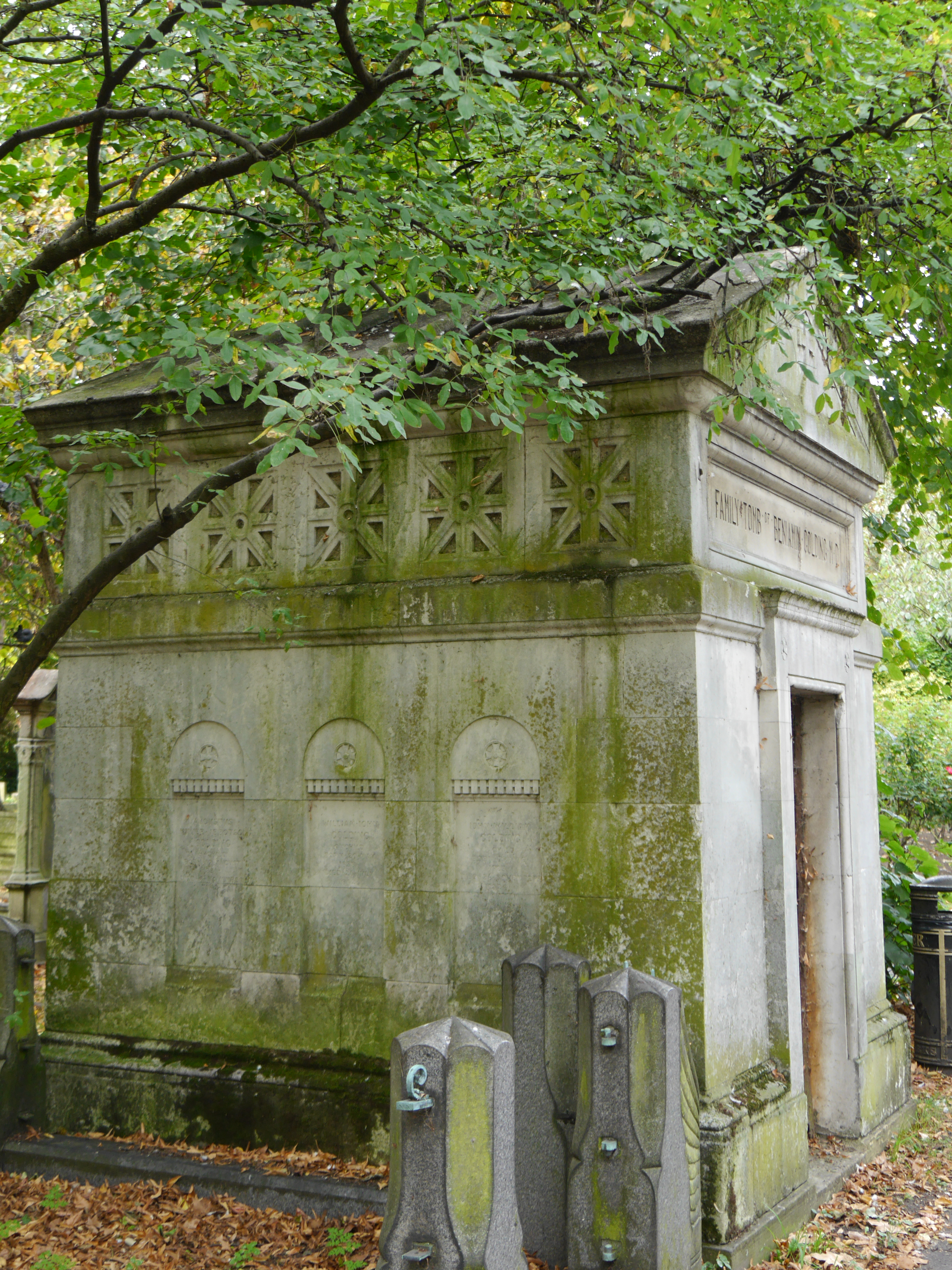
mausoleum, Brompton Cemetery

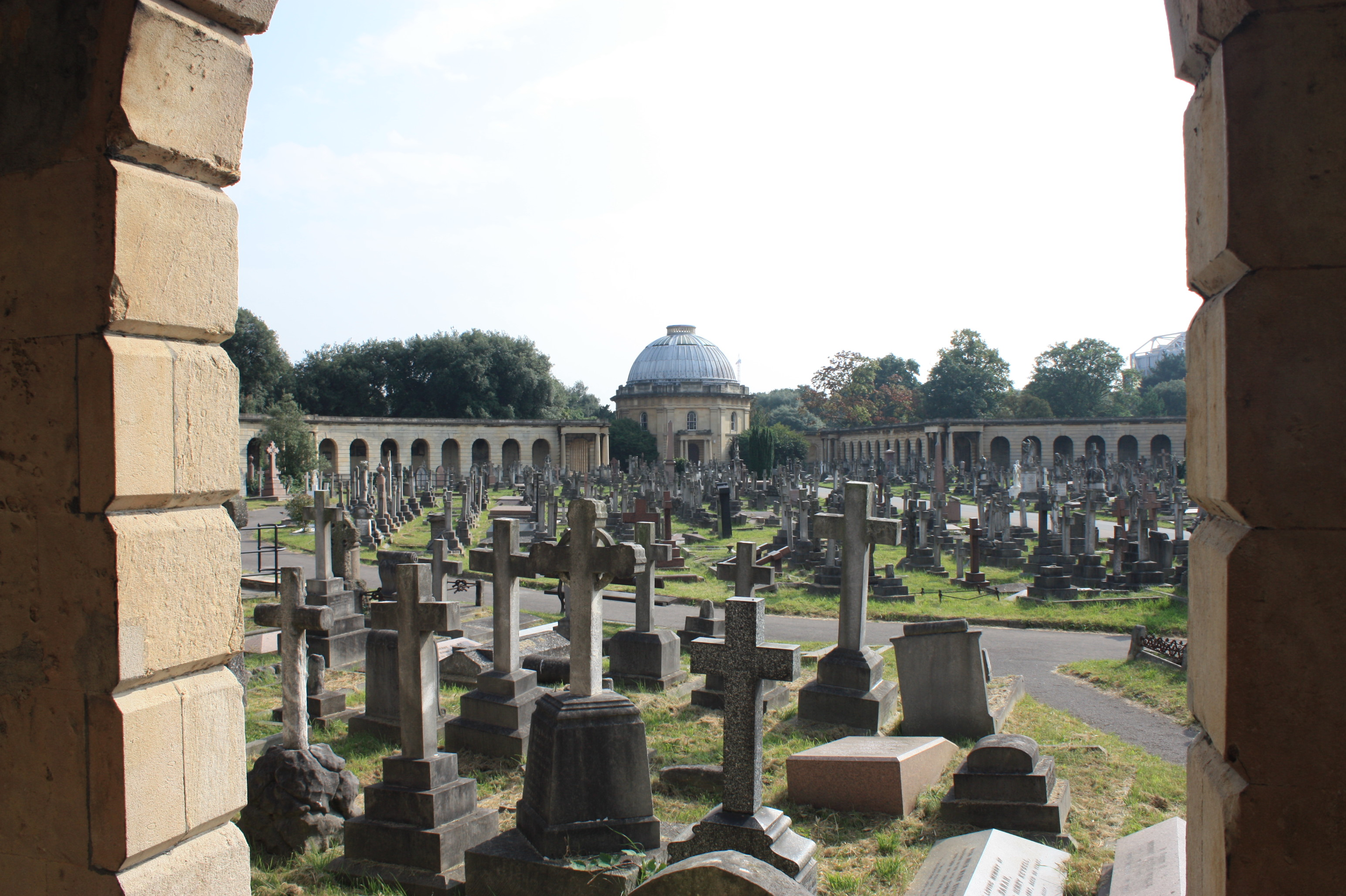
Central section

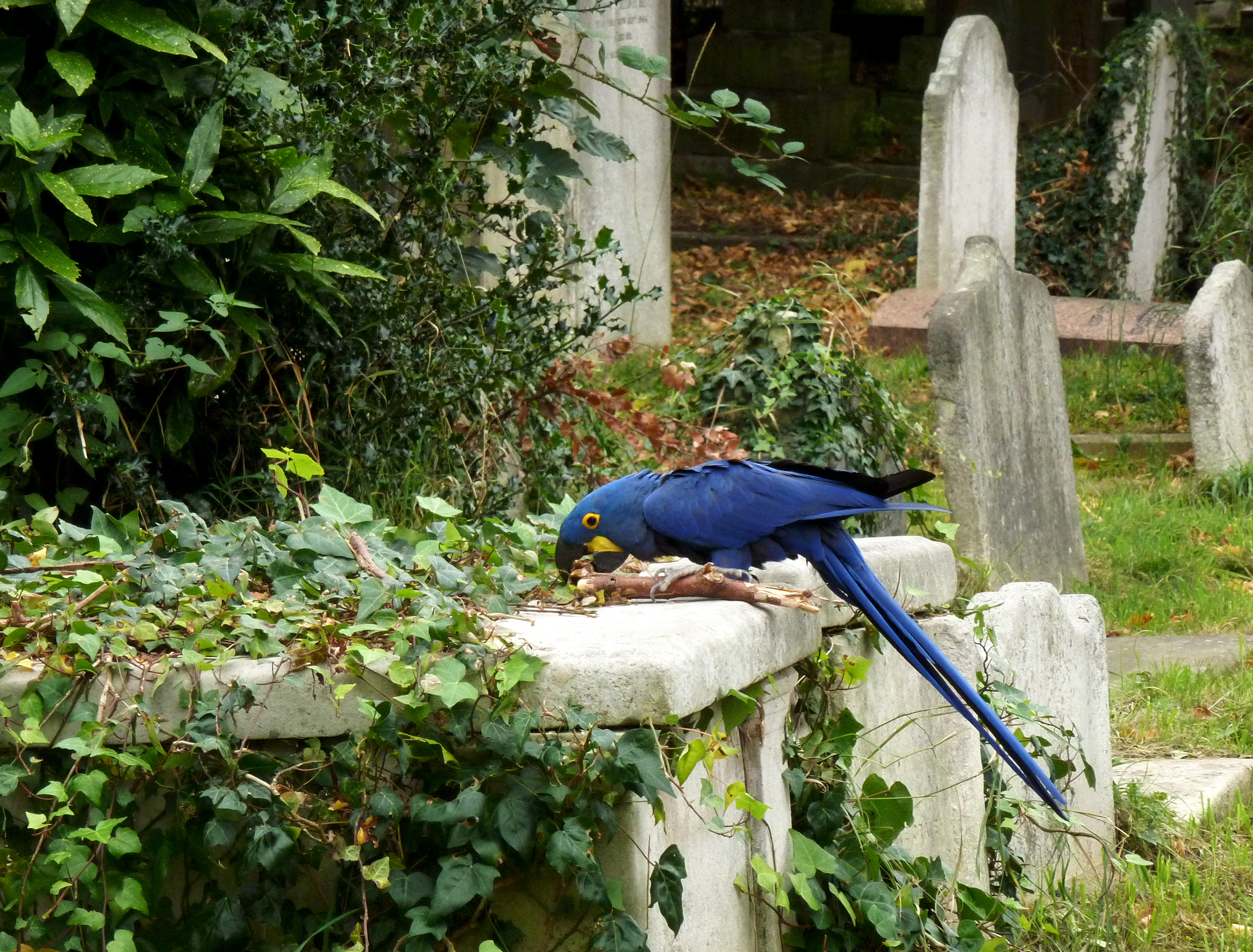
Blue visitor among Gravestones

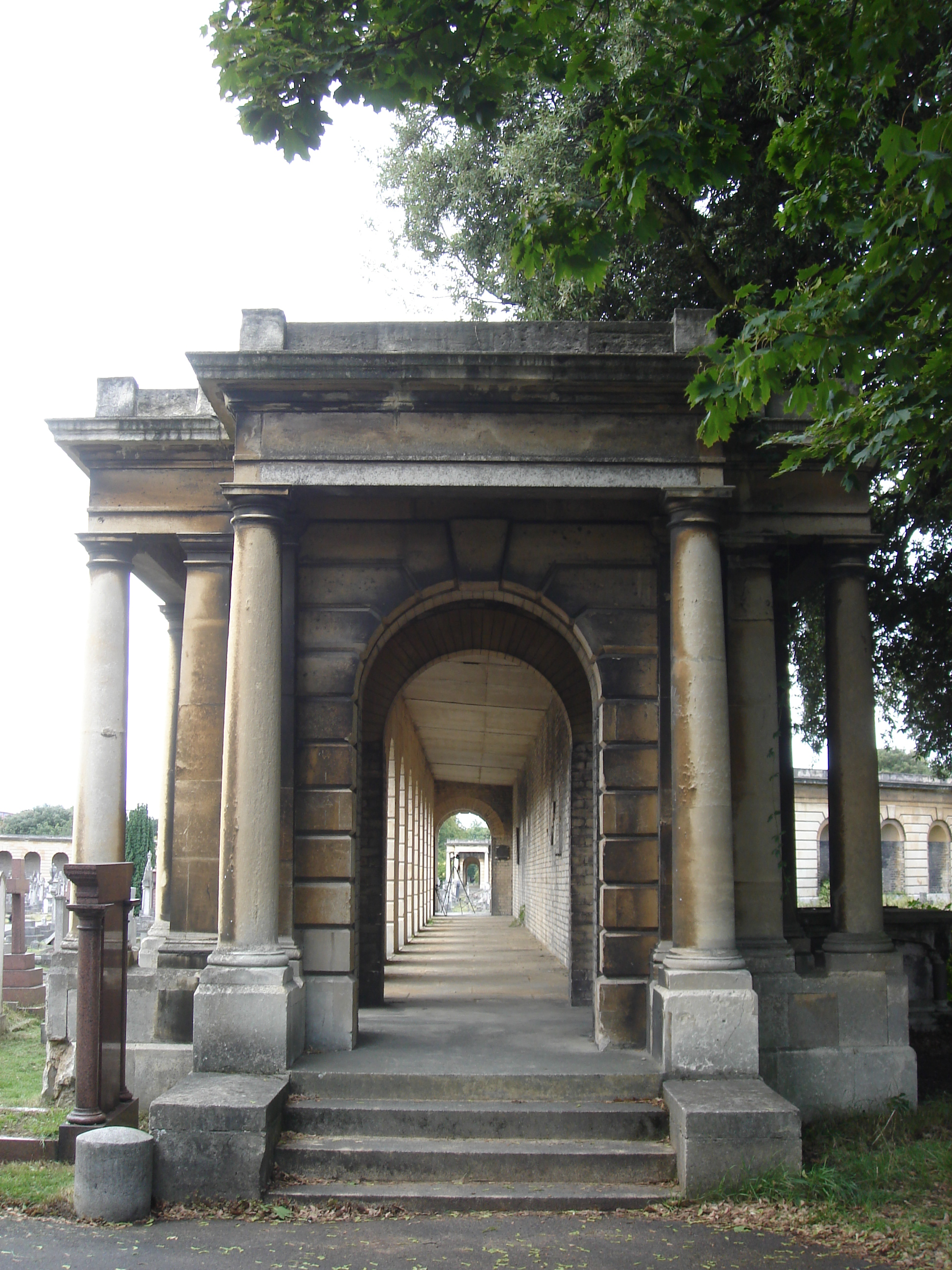
Brompton Cemetery SE Arcade

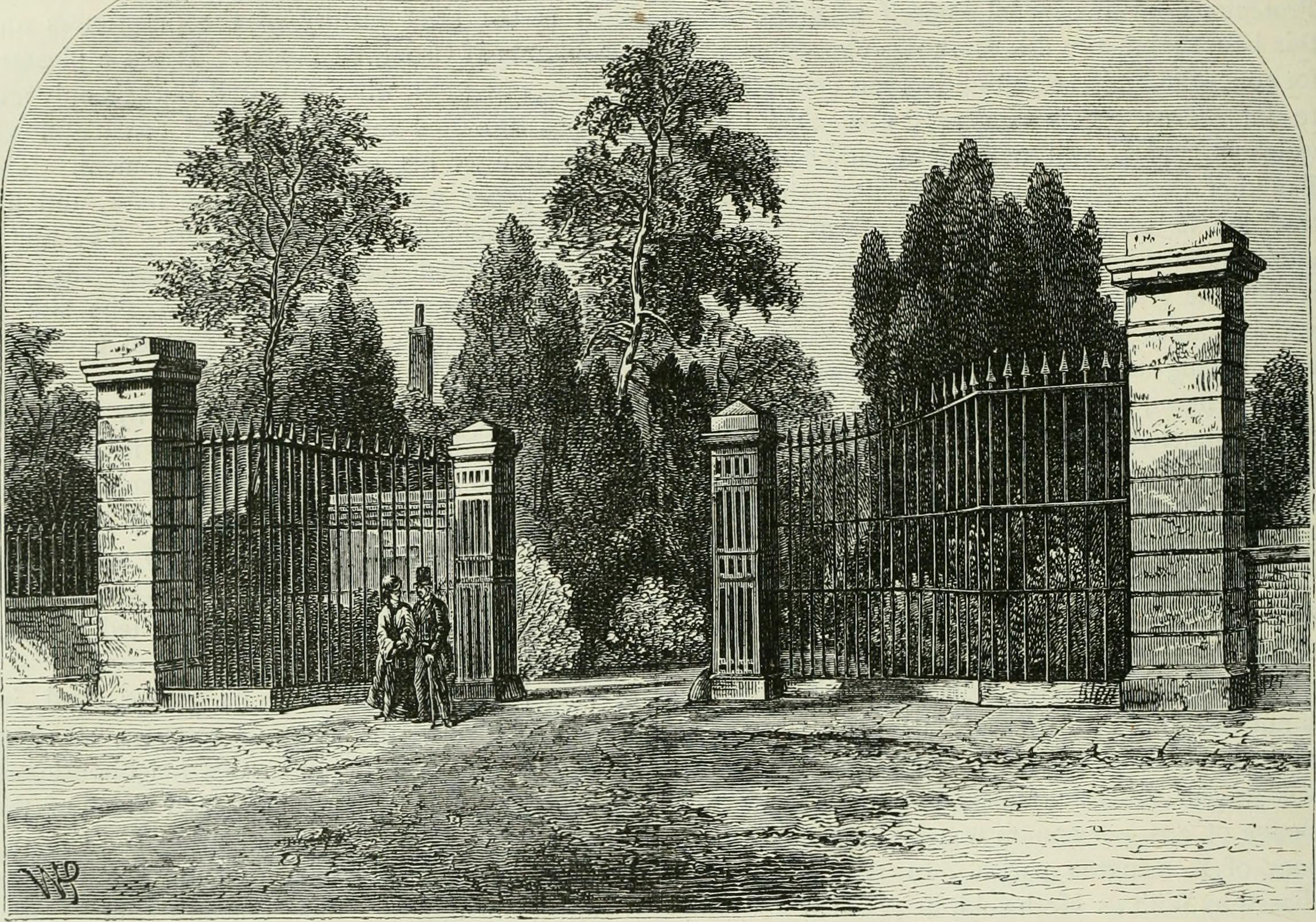
Fulham Road entrance (1873)

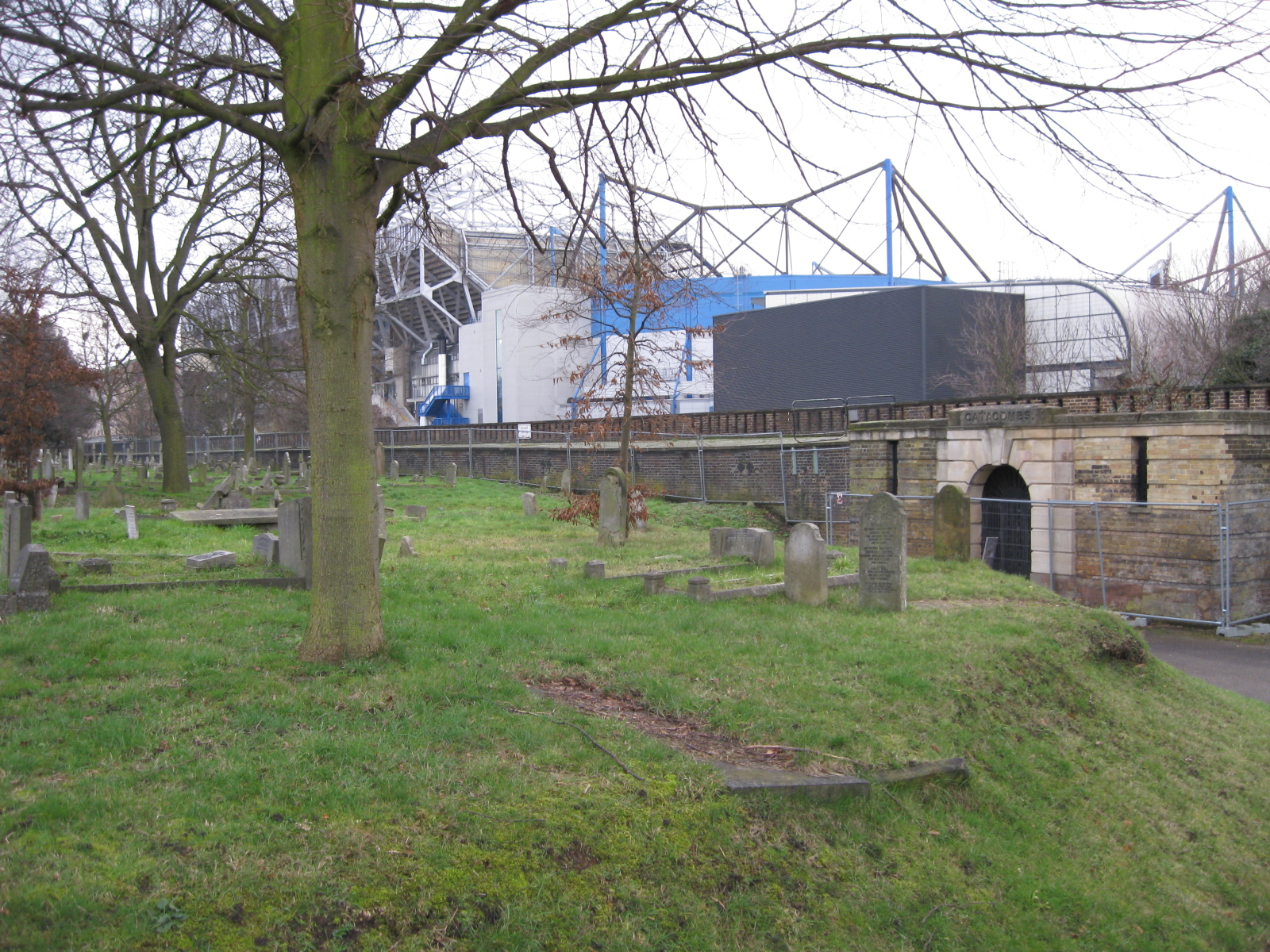
Brompton Cemetery near Stamford Bridge stadium

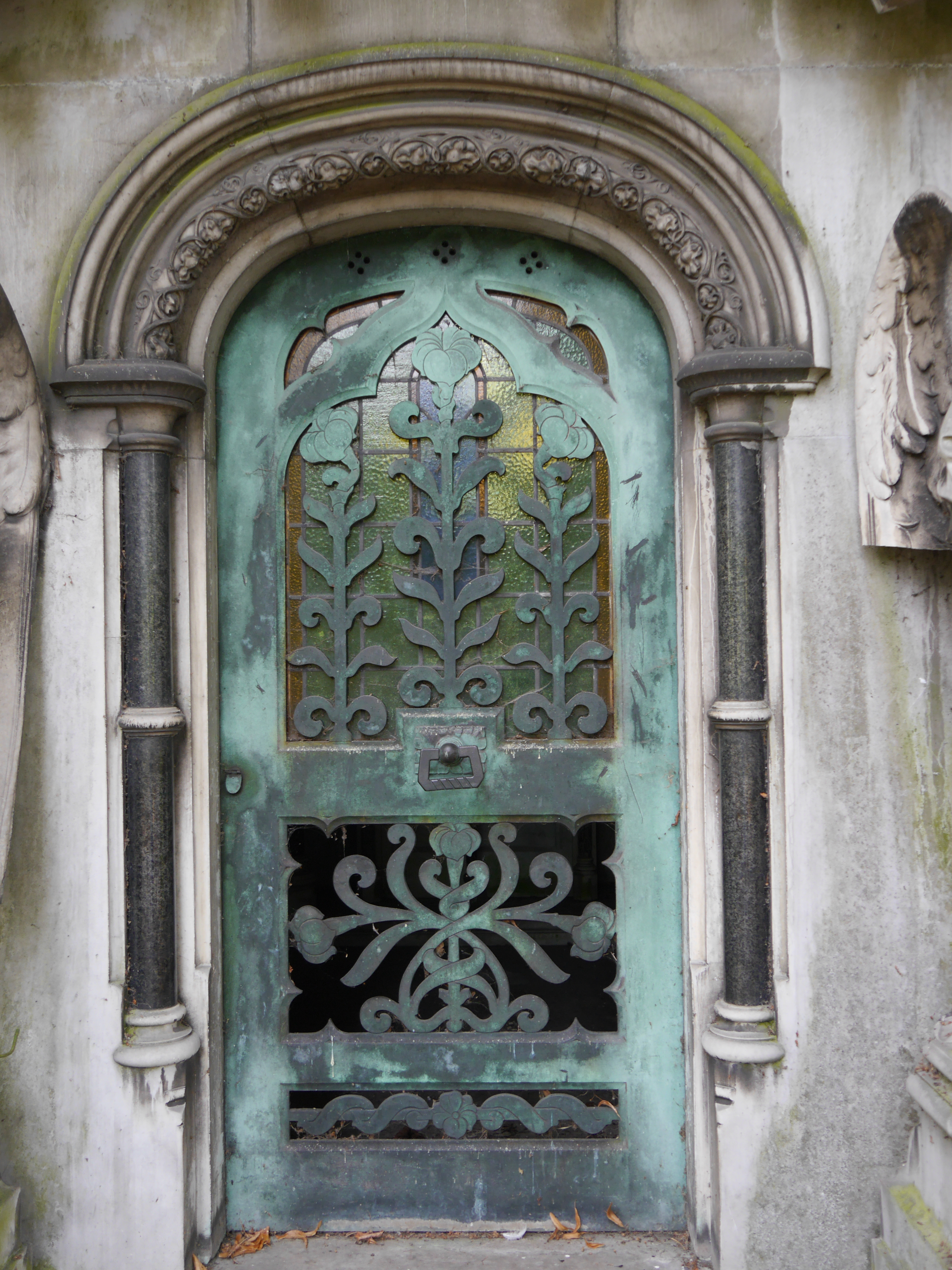
portal, Brompton Cemetery

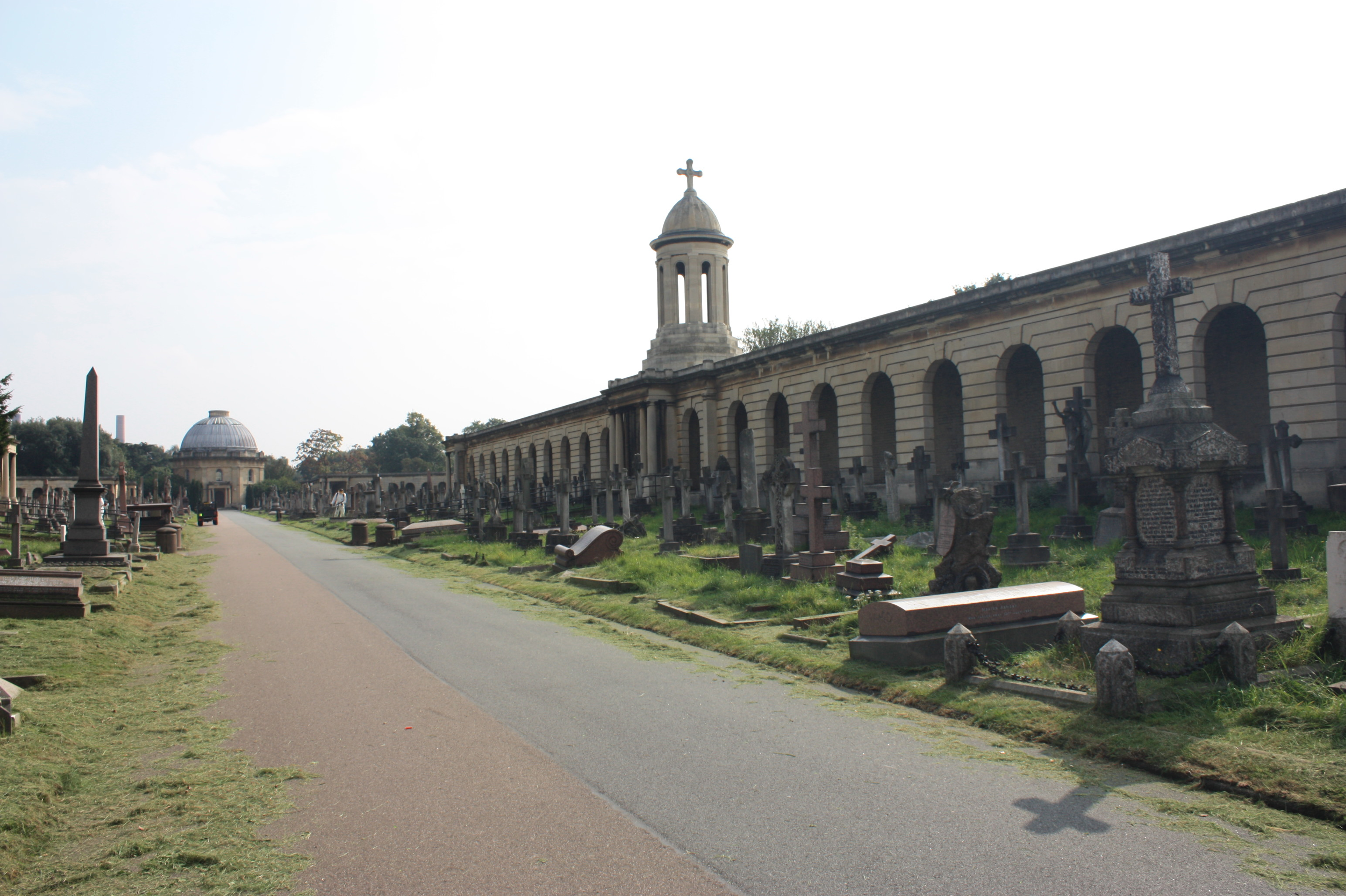
Central avenue, Brompton Cemetery

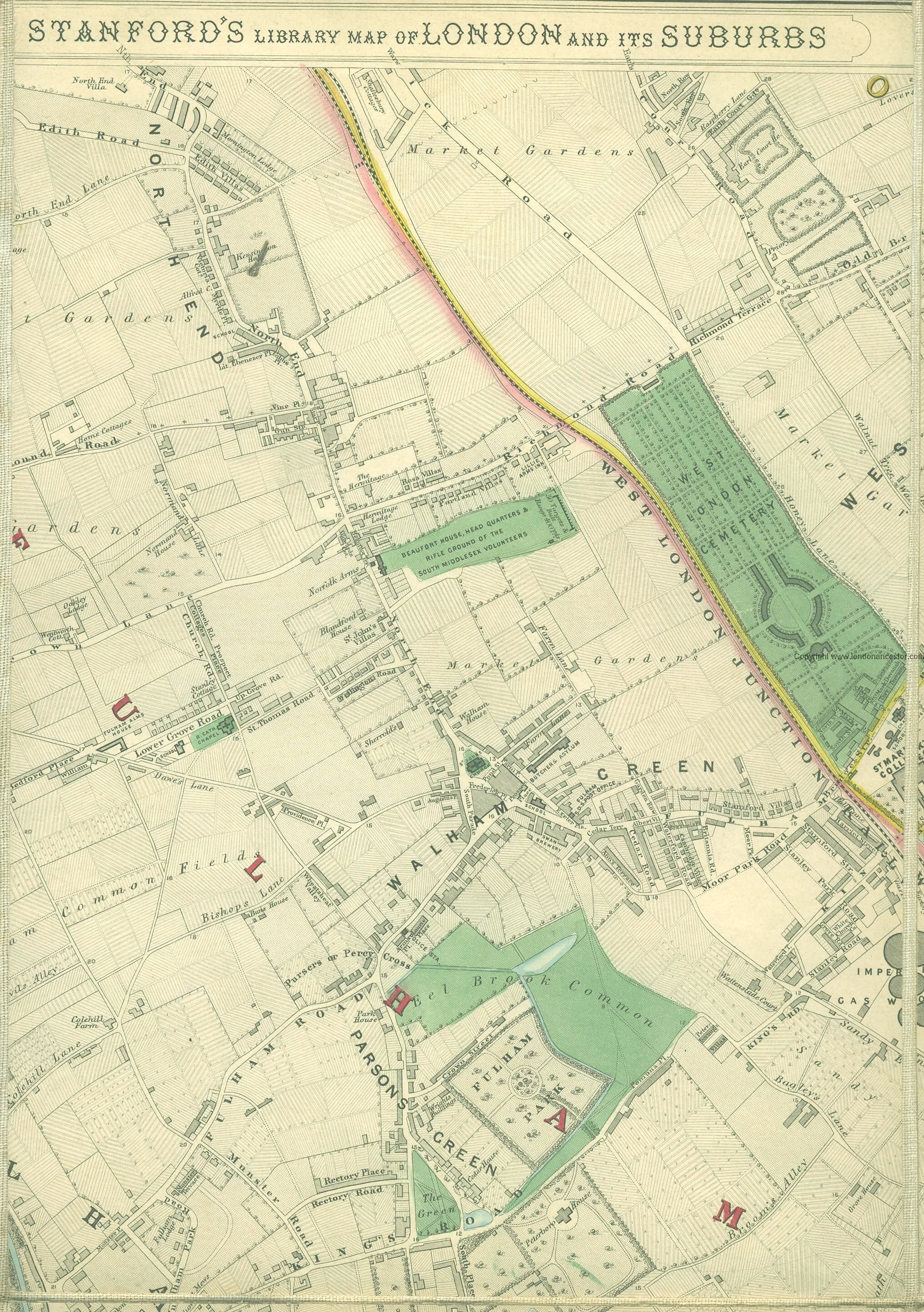
Middlesex, detail of Fulham c.1860

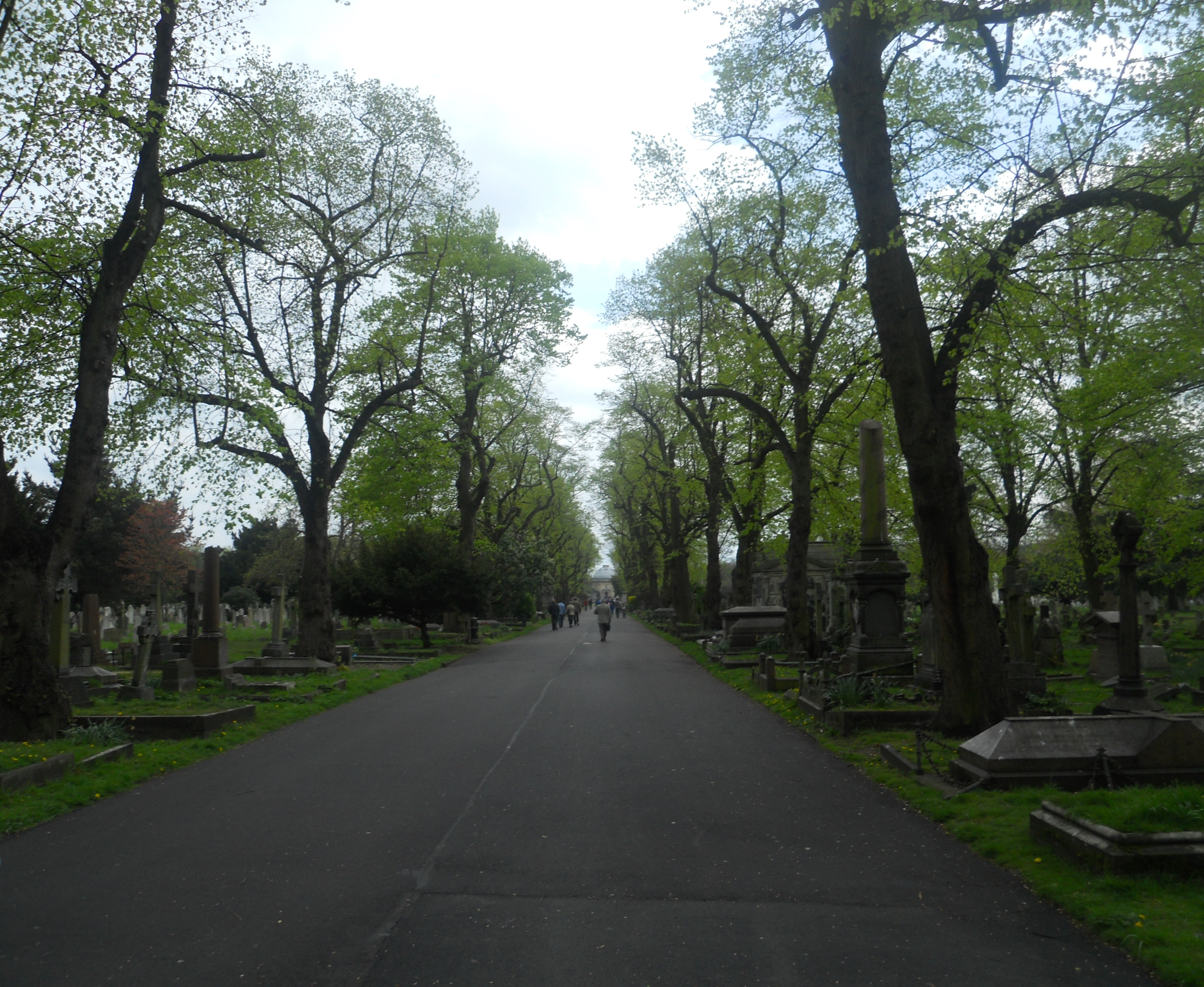
Central avenue, from North Lodge Brompton Cemetery

== See also ==
- Magnificent Seven cemeteries
- Funerary art
- London Cemetery and Extension
- Victorian cemetery
- Commonwealth War Graves Commission
