= 1981 Birthday Honours =

British government recognitions

The Queen's Birthday Honours 1981 were appointments in many of the Commonwealth realms of Queen Elizabeth II to various orders and honours to reward and highlight good works by citizens of those countries. The appointments were made to celebrate the official birthday of the Queen. They were published on 13 June 1981 for the United Kingdom, Australia, New Zealand, Mauritius, Fiji, The Bahamas, Papua New Guinea, Solomon Islands, Tuvalu, and Saint Lucia.

The recipients of honours are displayed here as they were styled before their new honour, and arranged by honour, with classes (Knight, Knight Grand Cross, etc.) and then divisions (Military, Civil, etc.) as appropriate.

== United Kingdom and Colonies ==
=== Life Peers ===
Barons

- Sir Theodore Constantine, CBE, AE, DL, lately Industrialist.
- Sir Lawrence Kadoorie, CBE, Partner, Sir Elly Kadoorie & Sons.
- The Right Honourable Sir Richard William Marsh, chairman, Newspaper Publishers' Association.
- Christopher Paget Mayhew, former Member of Parliament.

=== Privy Counsellors ===
- Neil Marten, MP, Minister of State, Foreign and Commonwealth Office and Minister for Overseas Development. Member of Parliament for Banbury.
- Alick Laidlaw Buchanan-Smith, MP, Minister of State, Ministry of Agriculture, Fisheries & Food. Member of Parliament for North Angus & Mearns.

=== Knights Bachelor ===
- Owen Arthur Aisher, Chairman, Marley Ltd.
- Ivor Ralph Campbell Batchelor, CBE, Professor of Psychiatry, University of Dundee.
- Peter Brian Baxendell, CBE, Chairman, Shell Transport and Trading Company.
- Kenneth Ormrod Boardman. For Political and Public Service, North Western Area.
- The Honourable Richard Clive Butler, DL, President, The National Farmers' Union.
- John Watson Cameron, OBE. For Political Service, Northern Area.
- Jonathan Dennis Clarke, President, The Law Society.
- John Alec Biggs-Davison, MP. For Political and Public Service.
- James Blair Duncan, Chairman, Transport Development Group Ltd.
- Alistair Gilchrist Frame, Deputy Chairman and Chief Executive, Rio Tinto Zinc Corporation Ltd. For services to Export.
- Howard Christian Sheldon Guinness, VRD. For Political Service, Wessex Area.
- Sidney Cyril Hamburger, CBE, DL, Chairman, North Western Regional Health Authority.
- Ernest Thomas Harrison, OBE, Chairman and Chief Executive, Racal Electronics Ltd. For services to Export.
- Godfrey Newbold Hounsfield, CBE, Senior Staff Scientist, Central Research Laboratories, Thorn EMI Ltd.
- Rabbi Immanuel Jakobovits, Chief Rabbi of the British Commonwealth.
- Marcus Richard Kimball, MP. For Political and Public Service.
- Peter Macadam, Chairman, B.A.T Industries Ltd.
- John Howard Middlemiss, CMG, Professor of Radiology, University of Bristol.
- William Rees-Mogg, lately Editor of The Times.
- Douglas Spottiswoode Morpeth, TD, Senior Partner, Touche Ross & Co.
- Geoffrey Arden Peacock, CVO, lately Remembrancer of the City of London.
- Harry Donald Secombe, CBE. For services to entertainment and charity.
- Richard Herbert Sheppard, CBE. For services to architecture.
- Keith Stanley Showering, Chairman and Chief Executive, Allied Breweries Ltd.
- Professor Thomas Broun Smith, QC. For services to Scottish Law.
- His Honour Judge William Walter Stabb, QC, Senior Official Referee of the Supreme Court.
- William Radcliife van Straubenzee, MBE, MP. For Political and Public Service.
- Patrick Henry Bligh Wall, MC, VRD, MP. For Political and Public Service.

Australian States

State of Victoria

- Gordon Laidlaw Allard. For services to the Royal Victorian Eye and Ear Hospital.
- Laurence Macdonald Muir. For services to the community.

State of Queensland

- William Guilford Allen. For service to broadcasting and pastoral industry.
- Robert William Mathers. For service to the retail industry and the community.

State of South Australia

- Bruce Roy Macklin, OBE. For services to commerce, charity and cultural affairs.

=== Order of the Bath ===
==== Knight Grand Cross of the Order of the Bath (GCB) ====
Civil Division

- Sir Patrick Dalmahoy Nairne, KCB, MC, Permanent Secretary, Department of Health & Social Security.

==== Knights Commander of the Order of the Bath (KCB) ====
Military Division

Royal Navy

- Vice-Admiral William Doveton Minet Staveley.

Army

- Lieutenant General James Malcolm Glover, MBE (403465) late The Royal Green Jackets.
- Lieutenant General Paul Anthony Travers (383450) late Royal Corps of Transport.

Royal Air Force

- Acting Air Marshal Michael Gordon Beavis, CBE, AFC.

Civil Division

- David Cardwell, CB, Chief of Defence Procurement, Ministry of Defence.
- Charles Addison Somerville Snowden Gordon, CB. Clerk of the House of Commons.

==== Companions of the Order of the Bath (CB) ====
Military Division

Royal Navy

- Rear Admiral Alexander Fortune Rose Weir.
- Rear Admiral Kenneth Henry George Willis.

Army

- Major General Peter Boucher Cavendish, OBE (349894), late 14th/20th King's Hussars.
- Major General Oliver John Kinahan (255822), late Royal Army Pay Corps.
- Major General William Thomson Macfarlane (382129) Colonel Commandant, Royal Corps of Signals (now RARO).
- Major General Walter Reynell Taylor (400085), late 4th/7th Royal Dragoon Guards.
- Major General Michael John Tomlinson, OBE (403706), late Royal Regiment of Artillery.

Royal Air Force

- Air Vice-Marshal Hugh Anthony Caillard.
- Air Vice-Marshal Donald Percy Hall, CBE, AFC.
- Air Vice-Marshal John Joseph Miller.
- Air Commodore Joan Metcalfe, RRC, QHNS, Princess Mary's Royal Air Force Nursing Service.

Civil Division

- Norman Joseph Adamson, QC, Legal Secretary to the Lord Advocate and First Parliamentary Draftsman for Scotland.
- Edward Norman Barry, lately Under Secretary, Northern Ireland Civil Service.
- Ronald Cecil Macleod Cooper, Deputy Secretary, Department of Industry.
- John Henry Vaughan Davies, Deputy Secretary, Ministry of Agriculture, Fisheries & Food.
- Angus McKay Fraser, TD, Deputy Secretary, Civil Service Department.
- Ronald Arthur Garner, lately Chief Valuer, Board of Inland Revenue.
- Basil Jack Greenhill, CMG, Director, National Maritime Museum.
- John Dudley Groves, OBE, Director General, Central Office of Information.
- Ian Henderson Johnston, Deputy Controller, Establishment Resources and Personnel, Procurement Executive, Ministry of Defence.
- Peter Frederick Kimmance, Under Secretary, Department of the Environment.
- John Leslie Harlow Kitchin, Chief Architect, Department of Education & Science.
- John Lane, Deputy Secretary, Cabinet Office.
- James Geoffrey Littler, Deputy Secretary, HM Treasury.
- James Forsyth McGarrity, HM Senior Chief Inspector of Schools, Scottish Education Department.
- Patrick Gerard McGrath, CBE, Physician Superintendent, Broadmoor Hospital, Department of Health & Social Security.
- Arthur Keith Pallot, CMG, Director-General, Commonwealth War Graves Commission.
- Alfred John Rosenfeld, Deputy Secretary, Department of Transport.
- Bernard Sheldon, Principal Director, Ministry of Defence.
- Dennis John Trevelyan, Deputy Secretary, Home Office.
- Ronald Charles Walmsley, lately Member, Lands Tribunal.

Australian States

State of South Australia

- Keith William Lewis, South Australia Director-General and Engineer-in-Chief.

=== Order of Saint Michael and Saint George ===
==== Knights Grand Cross of the Order of St Michael and St George (GCMG) ====
- Sir Clive Rose, KCMG, United Kingdom Permanent Representative on the North Atlantic Council.
- Sir Howard Smith, KCMG, lately Foreign & Commonwealth Office.

==== Knights Commander of the Order of St Michael and St George (KCMG) ====
- Edwin Bolland, CMG, HM Ambassador, Belgrade.
- Leonard Clifford William Figg, CMG, H.M. Ambassador, Dublin.
- Peter Harold Laurence, CMG, MC, H.M. Ambassador, Ankara.
- John Henry Gladstone Leahy, CMG, H.M. Ambassador, Pretoria.

==== Companions of the Order of St Michael and St George (CMG) ====
- Edward Benn, Under Secretary, Ministry of Defence.
- Graham Roger Serjeant, Director, Medical Research Council Laboratories, Jamaica.
- Robert Antony Frank Sherwood, Assistant Director-General, The British Council.

Diplomatic Service and Overseas List

- John Douglas Morrison Blyth, Foreign & Commonwealth Office.
- Colin Trevor Brant, CVO, HM Ambassador, Doha.
- Giles Lionel Bullard, HM Ambassador, Sofia.
- David Gordon Crawford, lately HM Consul-General, Atlanta.
- The Right Honourable John William, Viscount Dunrossil, British High Commissioner, Suva.
- David Alexander Ogilvy Edward, QC, lately President, Bars & Law Societies Consultative Committee, European Community.
- Patricia Margaret Hutchinson, HM Ambassador, Montevideo.
- Adrian Harbottle Reed, lately HM Consul-General, Munich.
- Denis Edward Richards, lately HM Ambassador, Yaounde.
- Hubert Anthony Justin Staples, HM Ambassador, Bangkok.
- Terence George Streeton, MBE, Foreign & Commonwealth Office.
- Peter William Unwin, Minister (Economic), HM Embassy, Bonn.
- Julian Fortay Walker, MBE, HM Ambassador, Sana'a.

Australian States

State of Victoria

- Keith Albert Rosenhain. For service to commerce.

State of South Australia

- The Honourable Clarence Ross Story. For political services.

State of Western Australia

- Denis Michael Cullity. For services to the forestry industry and the community.

=== Royal Victorian Order ===
==== Knight Grand Cross of the Royal Victorian Order (GCVO) ====
- The Most Noble Hugh Algernon, Duke of Northumberland, KG, TD.

==== Dame Commander of the Royal Victorian Order (DCVO) ====
- The Most Honourable Patricia, Marchioness of Abergavenny, CVO.

==== Knights Commander of the Royal Victorian Order (KCVO) ====
- Colonel Henry Nelson Clowes, CVO, DSO, OBE.
- The Very Reverend Hugh Osborne Douglas, CBE.
- Lieutenant Colonel John Frederick Dame Johnston, CVO, MC.

==== Commanders of the Royal Victorian Order (CVO) ====
- Douglas Walter Butt, MVO.
- Malcolm Rognvald Innes of Edingight.
- Graham McIntosh Patrick, CMG, DSC.

==== Members of the Royal Victorian Order, 4th class (MVO) ====
- Malcolm Blanch, MVO.
- William Aleck Craddock.
- Squadron Leader Michael John Hawes, Royal Air Force.
- Priscilla Mary Lethbridge.
- Stanley William Frederick Martin.
- Sylvia Mary Finola Stanier.
- Kenneth John Tanner.
- Lady Juliet Margaret Townsend.

==== Members of the Royal Victorian Order, 5th class (MVO) ====
- Penelope Judith Barbara Adair.
- Eileen Bruce.
- Amanda Mary Clare Corry.
- Gillian Rosamund Davies.
- Inspector David Mabon, Metropolitan Police.
- James Leonard Reeve Moller.
- Elizabeth Constance Hazel Sloot.
- Victor Owen Witham.

==== Medals of the Royal Victorian Order (RVM) ====
In Silver

- Robert Anderson.
- Yeoman Bed Hanger Edgar Thomas Bromfield, The Queen's Bodyguard of the Yeomen of the Guard.
- Chief Weapons Electrical Mechanic (Radio) Colin Charles Chennell, DO71468N.
- Police Constable Graham Fuller Cocks, Metropolitan Police.
- Edith Wilhelmina Collings.
- Yeoman Bed Goer Sidney Charles Eaton, The Queen's Bodyguard of the Yeomen of the Guard.
- N2568161 Sergeant Ronald Downie Ferguson, BEM, Royal Air Force.
- Thomas Galbraith.
- James Greenfield.
- Police Constable David Malcolm Groves, Metropolitan Police.
- Eric Thomas Roland Hersee.
- Yeoman Bed Hanger Kenneth Leonard Hooper, The Queen's Bodyguard of the Yeomen of the Guard.
- MO688350 Chief Technician James William Jeffery, Royal Air Force.
- Yeoman Bed Goer Thomas Henry John, The Queen's Bodyguard of the Yeomen of the Guard.
- Thomas Kelly.
- Donald Lipscombe.
- Eric David Moores.
- Yeoman Dennis Thompson, The Queen's Bodyguard of the Yeomen of the Guard.
- Paul Rowe Vaughan.

=== Order of the British Empire ===
==== Knights Grand Cross of the Order of the British Empire (GBE) ====
Military Division

Royal Air Force

- Air Chief Marshal Sir Robert Freer, KCB, CBE.

==== Dames Commander of the Order of the British Empire (DBE) ====
Civil Division

- Pamela Hunter. For Political and Public Service, Northern Area.
- Celia Johnson, CBE (Celia Elizabeth Fleming). Actress.
- The Right Honourable Irene Mervyn Parnicott Pike, Baroness Pike, lately chairman, Women's Royal Voluntary Service.

Australian States

State of South Australia

- Ruby Beatrice Litchfield, OBE. For services to the performing arts and to the community.

==== Knights Commander of the Order of the British Empire (KBE) ====
Military Division

Royal Navy

- Vice-Admiral Edwin John Horlick.

Army

- Lieutenant General Hubert Alan John Reay, QHP (406929), late Royal Army Medical Corps.

Royal Air Force

- Acting Air Marshal Peter Edward Bairsto, CB, CBE, AFC.

Civil Division
Diplomatic Service and Overseas List

- Alexander John Dickson Stirling, CMG, lately HM Ambassador, Baghdad.
- Leonard Williams, CB, lately Director-General for Energy, Commission of the European Communities.

Australian States

State of Victoria

- Robert Bell Roscoe. For public service.

==== Commanders of the Order of the British Empire (CBE) ====
Military Division

Royal Navy

- Captain David George Armytage, ADC.
- Captain Colin Neil MacEacharn, ADC.

Army

- Colonel (Local Brigadier) Maurice Alan Atherton (365090), late The Green Howards (Alexandra, Princess of Wales's Own Yorkshire Regiment).
- Colonel Ralph John Crossley (423988), late Royal Regiment of Artillery.
- Reverend Douglas Alan Dennis, QHC (436504), Deputy Chaplain General Royal Army Chaplains' Department.
- Brigadier Patrick Joseph Evans, MBE, ADC (382536), late Royal Corps of Signals.
- Colonel Peter Walter Graham, OBE (451249), late The Gordon Highlanders.
- Colonel Geoffrey Hall-Davies, TD, QHP (461856), late Royal Army Medical Corps, Territorial Army.
- Brigadier Michael Barry Pritchard, ADC (400028), late The Queen's Own Hussars.
- Brigadier Bryan Courtney Webster (415013), Deputy Colonel (City of London) The Royal Regiment of Fusiliers.

Royal Air Force

- Air Commodore Brian Huxley.
- Air Commodore James Mackereth Stevenson, OBE.
- Group Captain Richard Anthony Mason.
- Group Captain Robert Charles Olding, DSC.

Civil Division

- John Cottingham Alderson, QPM, Chief Constable, Devon & Cornwall Constabulary.
- Ronald Bernard Anderson. For Political Service in Scotland.
- Frank Glendinning Armstrong, Chief Executive, Highland Regional Council.
- Joseph Rayner Atkinson, President, Yorkshire Rent Assessment Panel.
- David Valentine Atterton, chairman, Iron & Steel Sector Working Party.
- Arthur Charles Barrett. For Political and Public Service.
- Thomas Robert Dalrymple Belgrave, lately Policy Adviser, British Petroleum Company Limited.
- James Peter Maclean Bell, lately General Manager, Group Personnel (Operations), Imperial Chemical Industries Ltd.
- Ernest Manley Bird, chairman, West Sussex Area Health Authority.
- Heinz Hermann Blandford. For charitable services particularly to post-graduate medical education.
- Peter Spencer Bowness, chairman, London Boroughs Association.
- William Brass, Professor of Medical Demography, London School of Hygiene & Tropical Medicine, University of London.
- Gerald Robert Brook, deputy chairman and Chief Executive, National Bus Company.
- Edwin Percy Brown, Director of Social Services, North Yorkshire County Council.
- Gilbert Buchan, MBE, President, Scottish Fishermen's Federation.
- Richard Burns, Middle Executive Directing Band, Scottish Economic Planning Department.
- Captain John Archibald Cameron, OBE, managing director, British Airways Helicopters Ltd.
- Michael Ambrose Cardew, MBE, Potter.
- Peter Carmichael, Joint Managing Director, Hewlett-Packard Ltd, South Queensferry.
- John Carson, Lord Mayor of Belfast.
- Robert Templeman Cole, chairman, Conder International Ltd.
- Nigel Dean Compston, Consultant Physician, King Edward VII Hospital for Officers, Royal Free Hospital and Royal Masonic Hospital, London.
- Sidney Arthur Cooke, MBE. For Political Service.
- Peter John Coomber, lately Town Clerk and Chief Executive, London Borough of Ealing.
- Barry Albert Cross, Director, Institute of Animal Physiology, Agricultural Research Council.
- Peter Maxwell Davies, Composer.
- Godfrey Rupert Carless Davis, Secretary, Royal Commission on Historical Manuscripts.
- Brian Ernest Edwards. For Political and Public Service, Eastern Area.
- Anthony Cradock Emmerson, lately chairman, Food & Drink Industries Council.
- William Alexander English, lately Principal Inspector of Taxes, Board of Inland Revenue.
- William Emrys Evans. For services to commerce and industry in Wales.
- William Knight Fitzgerald, DL, President, Convention of Scottish Local Authorities.
- Professor Peter Garnett Forrester, Director, School of Management and Pro Vice-Chancellor, Cranfield Institute of Technology.
- Stephen Gibbs, chairman, Turner & Newall Ltd, Manchester.
- Margaret Mary Gowing, Professor of the History of Science, University of Oxford.
- Ethel Marian Gray, Member, Scottish Council for Community Education.
- Francis George Hanrott, Chief Officer, Technician Education Council.
- Timothy Sydney Robert Hardy, Actor.
- Evelyn Mary Hawley, OBE. For Political Service.
- Howard Arthur Hicks, chairman and Chief Executive, IDC Group Ltd. For services to Export.
- Herbert Walmsley Higginson, MC. For services to Company Law.
- Alma Marie Elizabeth Hill. For Political and Public Service, West Midlands Area.
- Jesse Harry Hooper, TD, chairman and managing director, Armstrong Equipment Ltd.
- John Plaistowe Horder, OBE, President, The Royal College of General Practitioners.
- Doreen Mary Inniss, Headmistress, Kenton School, Newcastle upon Tyne.
- Edward Clifford Irving, Chairman of Executive Council and Member of the House of Keys.
- Thomas Harris Jenkins, General Secretary, Transport Salaried Staffs' Association.
- Professor Peter Erik Lasko, Director, Courtauld Institute of Art, University of London.
- John Alistair Lawton. For Political and Public Service, South Eastern Area.
- Leslie Lloyd, General Manager, Western Region, British Rail.
- Peter Arthur Long, lately Foreign & Commonwealth Office.
- John Patrick Marland, chairman, Central Council of Probation and After-Care Committees.
- Peter Barker Howard May. For services to Cricket.
- Peter Charles Hubbard-Miles. For Political and Public Service in Wales.
- Eric Robertson Mills, Registrar, Judicial Committee of the Privy Council.
- Professor Peter Joseph Mittler. For services to mentally handicapped people.
- Peter Edward Moody, lately Joint Secretary and Chief Investment Manager, Prudential Corporation Ltd.
- William Henry Dunne Morgan, Director, Northern Ireland Forensic Science Laboratory.
- John Clifford Moy, Controller for Scotland, Department of Health & Social Security.
- David Wigley Nickson, chairman, Confederation of British Industry in Scotland.
- Brian Wynne Oakley, Secretary, Science Research Council.
- Dennis Stanley Oliver, Director, Pilkington Brothers Ltd.
- Kenneth Gordon Oxford, QPM, Chief Constable, Merseyside Police.
- John Albert Partridge, Senior Partner, Howell, Killick, Partridge & Amis.
- Thomas Diery Patten, Professor of Mechanical Engineering, Heriot-Watt University.
- John William Pearson, Regional Administrator, Mersey Regional Health Authority.
- William Henry Petty, County Education Officer, Kent County Council.
- Anne Irene Pollard. For Political and Public Service, East Midlands Area.
- Arthur Geoffrey Pratt, chairman, South Eastern Region, British Gas Corporation.
- Leonard Regan, lately President, Carrington Viyella Ltd.
- Alberto Telisforo Remedios, Singer.
- William Richardson, chairman, Vickers Shipbuilding Group Ltd, and Vosper Thornycroft (UK) Ltd.
- Joyce Dora Hester Rose. For Political and Public Service.
- Walter Charles Rudkin, Middle Band Executive Director, Ministry of Defence.
- Robert Christopher Hamlyn Russell, Director, Hydraulics Research Station, Department of the Environment.
- Philip James Searby, Secretary, United Kingdom Atomic Energy Authority.
- Joshua Sieger, OBE, chairman, J. & S. Sieger Ltd. For services to Export.
- Colin Frederick Smale, MBE, managing director, Tucker Products Ltd.
- Arthur Norman Exton-Smith, Barlow Professor of Geriatric Medicine, University College Hospital Medical School, University of London.
- Harold Emanuel Smith, VRD. For public services in Northern Ireland.
- Walter Smyth. For services to agriculture and commerce in Northern Ireland.
- Bruce Wilson Sutherland. For Political Service.
- John Wingate Sutherland, managing director, Marconi Radar Systems Ltd. For services to Export.
- Eric Swainson, managing director, Imperial Metal Industries Limited.
- Arthur William Charles Taylor, chairman, North-East Industrial Development Board.
- James Leslie Thorne, managing director (Civil), Aircraft Group, British Aerospace. For services to Export.
- Clifford James Tilley, chairman, Willett & Son (Corn Merchants) Ltd, Bristol.
- Professor Bernard Evans Tomlinson, Consultant Neuropathologist, General Hospital Newcastle upon Tyne.
- Maurice John Treble, lately Assistant Secretary, Department of Trade.
- Kenneth Sydney Vaus. For Political Service.
- Philip Mesban Vine, chairman, London Housing and New Town Staff Commission.
- Robert Nelstrop Wadsworth, President, Cocoa, Chocolate & Confectionery Alliance.
- Ronald Frederick Watkiss. For services to local government in Cardiff.
- Leslie Knapton Way, Parliamentary Lobby Correspondent, Western Morning News.
- Peter Scott Wellington, DSC, Director, National Institute of Agricultural Botany.
- Captain Harry Bell Whitehead, OBE, lately National Chairman, Royal British Legion.
- John Eric Williams, Director and deputy chairman, Foster Wheeler Energy Ltd. For services to Export.
- Leonard Edmund Henry Williams, DFC, lately chairman, The Building Societies Association.
- George David Norman Worswick, Director, National Institute of Economic and Social Research.
- Eric Alfred Wright, Assistant Secretary, Board of Customs & Excise.
- Paul Isaac Zetter, chairman, Sports Aid Foundation.

Diplomatic Service and Overseas List

- John Davies Campbell, CVO, MBE, MC, HM Consul-General, Naples.
- John Lyne Duncan, MBE. For services to the British community in Mexico.
- Henry Albert Fosbrooke. For services to the community in Tanzania.
- Dennis Haley Foster, MBE, Chief Secretary, Cayman Islands.
- Eric Peter Ho, Secretary for Social Services, Hong Kong.
- Alistair Walter Graham MacIntyre. For services to British commercial interests and the British community in Calcutta.
- Charles Henry Wilson, lately Professor of History, European University Institute, Florence.
- John Wyatt-Smith. For services to forestry development in Nepal.

Australian States

State of Victoria

- The Honourable James Charles Murray Balfour. For public and parliamentary services.
- Arthur Stanley Mayne. For public service.

State of Queensland

- George Vivian Roberts. For community services.

==== Officers of the Order of the British Empire (OBE) ====
Military Division

Royal Navy

- Commander Edward Joseph Cavanagh.
- Major Edward Charles MacKenzie Goddard, Royal Marines.
- Surgeon Commander Francis St. Clair Golden.
- Commander Timothy David Kitson.
- Local Lieutenant Colonel James Robert Mason, MVO, Royal Marines.
- Commander John Littleton Palmer.
- Commander James Mellanby Phillips.
- Acting Captain Geoffrey Munday Seton Sayer.
- Commander William Hutton Stewart.
- Chief Officer Wendy Patricia Vernon-Browne, RD, Women's Royal Naval Reserve.

Army

- Lieutenant Colonel Robert John Michael Carson (439966), The Royal Irish Rangers (27th (Inniskilling) 83rd & 87th).
- Lieutenant Colonel (now Acting Colonel) Peter Royson Duffell, MC (466356), 2nd King Edward VII's Own Gurkha Rifles (The Sirmoor Rifles).
- Lieutenant Colonel Henry John Hickman (460866), Royal Pioneer Corps.
- Lieutenant Colonel Donald Arthur Horner (382598), Royal Army Educational Corps.
- Lieutenant Colonel Philip Christopher Reddall Howes (451266), Royal Regiment of Artillery.
- Acting Colonel Philip Frederick Hurst (290142), Army Cadet Force, Territorial Army.
- Lieutenant Colonel Henry Stewart Lyons (468131), Intelligence Corps.
- Lieutenant Colonel Clive Haydn Martin, TD (452878), The Honourable Artillery Company, Territorial Army.
- Lieutenant Colonel (now Acting Colonel) Anthony Leslie Meier (455061), Royal Corps of Transport.
- Lieutenant Colonel (Quartermaster) Raymond Morris (485017), 4th/7th Royal Dragoon Guards.
- Lieutenant Colonel Richard Stanley Mountford (461478), Royal Regiment of Artillery.
- Lieutenant Colonel Reginald Peter Myhill, TD (471605), Royal Corps of Signals, Territorial Army.
- Lieutenant Colonel Lal Bahadur Pun, MC (463364), 2nd King Edward VII's Own Gurkha Rifles (The Sirmoor Rifles).
- Lieutenant Colonel Keith James Rand (437251), Army Catering Corps.
- Lieutenant Colonel Roger Anthony Rodick (418376), Royal Regiment of Artillery.
- Lieutenant Colonel Richard Campbell Rothery, MBE (432939), The Royal Irish Rangers (27th (Inniskilling) 83rd & 87th).
- Lieutenant Colonel (Quartermaster) Frank Sewell (477474), Corps of Royal Engineers.
- Lieutenant Colonel Stewart Graham Small (466482), Intelligence Corps (now RARO).
- Lieutenant Colonel Anthony Whittall, MBE (457308), Royal Corps of Transport.
- Lieutenant Colonel Herbert Arthur Woolnough, MBE (461526), The Worcestershire & Sherwood Foresters Regiment (29th/45th Foot).

Overseas Award

- Lieutenant Colonel Domingo Luis Collado, MBE (GR/0/7018), Gibraltar Regiment.

Royal Air Force

- Wing Commander Keith Francis Ashley (506528).
- Wing Commander Kevin John O'Connor Balsillie (2765186).
- Wing Commander Peter Blake (3110014).
- Wing Commander John Duncan Heron (607694).
- Wing Commander Reginald Arthur Holman (592730).
- Wing Commander Alexander Freeland Cairns Hunter, AFC (2620410).
- Wing Commander Thomas Graham Roland Osborn, MBE (4148874).
- Wing Commander Roger Smeeton (2743219).
- Wing Commander Brian Neville Wanstall (2379232).
- Wing Commander Joseph Wiltshire (5035205).
- Wing Commander John Arthur Worrall (3504507).

Civil Division

- Douglas Ian Acres, DL. For services to the Magistracy in Essex.
- William Hector Alexander, Assistant Managing Director, Rochester, Marconi Avionic Systems Ltd.
- Maurice Wilfrid Allen, lately Marine Information Manager, Shell International Petroleum Co. Ltd.
- Kenneth John Allright, lately chairman, Meat Promotion Executive, Meat & Livestock Commission.
- Christopher Anderson, Vice-chairman, Scottish Sports Council.
- William John Arrol. For services to the National Engineering Laboratory.
- John Malcolm Banks, Group Traffic Manager, The Littlewoods Organisation Ltd.
- Kenneth Ernest Bantock, Port Director, Humber.
- Alison Barnes (Mary Vera Barnes), Press Officer, Soldiers', Sailors' & Airmen's Families Association.
- Michael James Barnes, General Administrator and artistic director, Grand Opera House, Belfast.
- Olive Barnett (Josephine Anne Consuelo Martin French), Principal, Savoy Hotel Staff Training School.
- Gwendoline Connie Barrow. For Political and Public Service, Western Area.
- Angela Margaret Barton. For Political and Public Service, East Midlands Area.
- Thomas Alfred Barton, lately Director, Product Engineering, Land Rover Ltd., BL Ltd. For services to Export.
- Major Albert Andrew Belsham (Rtd), Senior Fire Service Officer, Army Fire Service, Ministry of Defence.
- Francis Noel Beveridge, Consultant, National Industrial Fuel Efficiency Service Ltd.
- Jessica Blooman, Chief Probation Officer, Berkshire Probation and After-Care Service.
- Katharine Emma Lucas Bowler. For Political and Public Service, Eastern Area.
- Margaret McGowan Bradley (Sister Felicitas), lately Headteacher, Our Lady & St. Francis Secondary School, Glasgow.
- Richard Arthur Branston, lately managing director, Allied Grocery Distributors Ltd.
- Trevor Stratton Braybrooke, Deputy Managing Director, Chubb & Son Ltd. For services to Export.
- Isobel Christine Stewart Brown, District Nursing Officer, King's Health District (Teaching), Lambeth, Southwark and Lewisham Area Health Authority.
- William Alexander Brown, lately General Administrator, Greater Glasgow Health Board.
- Henry Burtt. For services to the seed growing industry.
- Frederic Kenneth Butler, DSC, lately chairman, Guide Dogs for the Blind Association.
- Eric Charles, Chief Executive, R.A.C. Motoring Services Ltd.
- Tom Clarke, DSM, chairman and Chief Executive, Silentnight Holdings Ltd.
- Hugh Arthur Colgate, Headmaster, Buckhurst Hill County High School, Essex.
- Donald John Collyer, Senior Principal Scientific Officer, Banded Officer, Atomic Weapons Research Establishment, Ministry of Defence.
- Frederick Charles William Colmer, lately Director of Planning, Central Electricity Generating Board.
- Harry Francis Constantine, Director, Sheffield City Art Galleries.
- Alan Cooper. For Political and Public Service.
- Colonel Charles Herbert Kenneth Corsar, TD, DL, Vice President, Boys' Brigade in Scotland.
- Hugh Lyall Cottle. For Services to the Welsh Water Authority.
- Douglas Malcolm Craig. For Political and Public Service, Yorkshire Area.
- Alexander Stewart Crockett, Director of Highways, Lothian Regional Council.
- The Very Reverend Samuel Bennett Crooks, TD, Dean of Belfast.
- Ronald Arthur Braybrooke Crowe, Senior Principal, Board of Customs & Excise.
- Patrick Francis D'Arcy, Professor of Pharmacy, Queen's University, Belfast.
- David Hywel Davies. For Public service in Wales.
- Douglas David Davis. For Political and Public Service, West Midlands Area.
- John Stanley Davison, Member, Heavy Electrical Machinery Sector Working Party.
- Albert Oswald Dearden, DL, lately chairman, Greater Manchester Federation of Boys' Clubs.
- Norman Gerald Dearden, assistant director, Newcastle upon Tyne Polytechnic.
- Mabel Lilian de la Motte. For Political and Public Service.
- Sidney Ivor Dennett, chairman, National Joint Council for Administration, Professional, Technical & Clerical Services.
- Guy Malcolm Dixon Drummond, deputy chairman, Trind Ltd.
- John Anthony East, Director, External Relations, English Tourist Board.
- Henry Royston Farmery, lately Principal Aviation Security Adviser, Department of Trade.
- Donald Fazakerley, Secretary, The Industrial Society.
- Frank Leassing Ffoulkes, Personnel Director, East Midlands Region, British Gas Corporation.
- Alan William Forsyth, managing director, Furmanite International Ltd. For services to Export.
- John Fotheringham, managing director, North Eastern Farmers Ltd.
- Henry John Augustus Fox, Chief Examiner, Board of Inland Revenue.
- John William Fozard, Divisional Marketing Director, Kingston-Brough Division, British Aerospace. For services to Export.
- Peter Galliford, chairman, Galliford Brindley Ltd.
- David Stewart Gandy, Chief Prosecuting Solicitor, Greater Manchester Council.
- Mary Begg Gauld, Head, Department of History, Aberdeen College of Education.
- William Gerrard. For services to Chemistry.
- John Gibb, chairman, Borders Health Board.
- Donald David Gilbert. For Political and Public Service, Northern Area.
- Barbara Olive Glasgow, General Secretary, Birmingham Council for Old People.
- Alfred Joseph Gooding, chairman, A. J. Gooding Group.
- Cyril Brooker Grant, MC, TD, lately Principal Youth and Community Officer, Norfolk County Council.
- Colin Clark Grantham. For Political and Public Service, North Western Area.
- Denis John Pereira Gray, General Medical Practitioner, Exeter.
- Kenneth David Gribbin, MBE, Secretary General, Cancer Research Campaign.
- Leonard Philip Grice, chairman, Coventry & Warwickshire District Manpower Committee.
- Evelyn Edwin Griffiths, Partner, Ernest Griffiths & Son.
- Harry Charles Gunning, chairman, Lincolnshire Family Practitioner Committee, and Member, Lincolnshire Area Health Authority.
- Norman Frederick Hackney, Superintending Engineer, Midland Road Construction Unit, Derbyshire County Council Sub-Unit.
- Sue Hammerson. For Charitable services.
- Edwin Robert Hawkings. For services to the community in Salisbury.
- Captain Francis Walker Christie Hay. For services to the Royal British Legion in Scotland.
- Jean Hayes, President, Mid-Glamorgan Branch, British Red Cross Society.
- John Richard Clucas Hayward, chairman, Bath and Wells Diocesan Board of Finance.
- Michael Henry James Hill, Director, Don Brothers, Buist & Co. Ltd. For services to the British Standards Institution.
- Gerald George Pashley Holden, General Dental Practitioner, Chesterfield.
- Frederick William Holder. For services to Athletics.
- Stanley John Holder, Director of Nurse Education, North West Health District, Kensington & Chelsea & Westminster Area Health Authority.
- Ann Penelope Houston, Periodicals Editor, British Film Institute.
- Gwyneth Clare Huelin, MBE, Senator, States of Jersey.
- Ernest Roy Hurr, Professional and Technology Superintendent, Ministry of Defence.
- Norman Harold Ingle, National Secretary, National Council of Young Men's Christian Associations.
- Donald William Insall, Architect and Planning Consultant.
- Gilbert James Jeacocke, Deputy Superintending Inspector, Health & Safety Executive, Department of Employment.
- Elizabeth Jenkins (Margaret Elizabeth Heald Jenkins), Writer.
- Arthur Stanley Jerwood, Regional Administration Director, Merck Sharp & Dohme Ltd.
- John Boyd Keirs, Director, Barnsley Area, National Coal Board.
- Rodger David Ker, lately chairman, Hill Farming Research Organisation.
- Vivian Mary Kerr, Principal, Girls' Model School, Belfast.
- Ian Campbell Kirkwood, Senior Partner, Hulley and Kirkwood, Glasgow.
- Harry Legge (Henry James Granville Legge), Conductor.
- Neville Arthur Wren Le Grand, Chief Administrative Officer, The Royal Society.
- Estelle Josephine Mary Leigh, Pharmacist, Ormskirk.
- John Leithead, Senior Principal, Scottish Office.
- Professor Geoffrey Michael Lilley, formerly Member, Noise Advisory Council.
- The Reverend Arthur Leitch Macarthur, lately General Secretary, United Reformed Church.
- Gerald McDonald, Administrator, National Opera Studio.
- James Miller McInroy, Surgeon, Gwynedd Area Health Authority.
- John Mackay, General Medical Practitioner, Govan, Glasgow.
- The Reverend Canon Alan George Kett Fairbairn Mackenzie. For services to the deaf.
- Eleanor Janet Macnair, Senior Principal Scientific Officer, Ministry of Defence.
- George Alexander McNichol, chairman, South Tyneside Panel of Enterprise North.
- Reginald Main, Director, Projects and Development, Institution of Mechanical Engineers.
- Vernon Maitland, managing director, Excelsior Motorways Ltd.
- Jack Matthews, General Medical Practitioner. For services to Rugby Football.
- David Rogerson Mellor, Designer and Silversmith.
- John Stephen Moon, Staff Inspector, Birmingham Local Education Authority.
- Frances Joan Harvey Moore, Scientific Liaison Officer, Ministry of Agriculture, Fisheries & Food.
- John Lewis Morgan, chairman, Housing & Environmental Health Committee, Association of District Councils.
- James Anthony Morrison, the Director, Hereford Herd Book Society.
- Brian Morrissey, QPM, General Secretary, Association of Chief Police Officers of England, Wales & Northern Ireland.
- James Mottram, chairman, Board of Visitors, HM Prison, Liverpool.
- Carlo Alberto Luigi Naef, chairman, J. & E. Page (Sales) Ltd.
- Helen Mary Neeson, lately Senior Inspector, Department of Education for Northern Ireland.
- Captain Douglas John Newman. For Political and Public Service, South Eastern Area.
- William Henry Ronald Nicholl, Member, Northern Ireland Housing Executive, and Northern Ireland Housing Council.
- Arthur Edward Nicholls, QFSM, Assistant Chief Officer, London Fire Brigade.
- Norman Cornthwaite Nicholson, Poet and Author.
- Colonel Norman Thomas Nicol, TD, DL. For services to the East Midlands Territorial, Auxiliary & Volunteer Reserve Association.
- Paul Ignatius O'Doherty, chairman, Londonderry Port & Harbour Commissioners.
- Norman John Page, MC, Secretary-General, Institute of Actuaries.
- Richard Augustus Palmer, TD, DL. For services to the Magistracy in Northampton.
- Commander John Paton, RN (Rtd), Professional Officer, Department of Trade.
- John Hamflett Pearson, lately Headmaster, Woodharn Comprehensive School, Newton Aycliffe.
- Kenneth Stanley Pegg, Head, Centre for the Deaf, City Literary Institute, London.
- Donald Hugh Phillips, Senior Principal Scientific Officer, Forestry Commission.
- Peter Harold Pinchbeck, managing director, Tar & Benzole Group, BSC (Chemicals) Ltd.
- George Angus Pollock. For services to the community and especially to the British Red Cross Society in Scotland.
- David Powis, QPM, Deputy Assistant Commissioner, Metropolitan Police.
- William Stanley Pringle, QPM, Deputy Chief Constable, Lothian & Borders Police.
- Philip Andrew Banks Raffle, Chief Medical Officer, London Transport Executive.
- Sally Ramsden. For public service particularly in the North East.
- The Honourable Joan Rosemary Raynsford. For Political and Public service, Greater London Area.
- Allan Richardson, Member, North West Water Authority.
- Barbara Mary Ridler. For Political Service.
- Peter Marshall Robins. For Public Service in Gloucestershire.
- Peter George Robinson, HM Inspector of Fire Services Grade I, Home Office Fire Services Inspectorate.
- Constance Margaret Romanes, chairman, Board of Visitors, Portland Borstal.
- Gordon Kenneth Rose, lately Director, Orthotic Research & Locomotor Assessment Unit, Robert Jones & Agnes Hunt Orthopaedic Hospital, Oswestry.
- Joseph Rossiter, Headmaster, Corpus Christi High School, Leeds.
- Laura Elizabeth Rowe. For Political and Public Service in Wales.
- Richard Andrew Ryder. For Political Service.
- Doris Salisbury, District Nursing Officer, Preston Health District, Lancashire Area Health Authority.
- David Geoffrey Martin Sanders, chairman, Westerly Marine Construction Ltd.
- Robert Whitfield Scott, managing director, British Industrial Sand Group of Companies.
- Keith Roberts Simpson, Principal Civil Engineer, Department of the Environment.
- Ronald Allen Spencer, deputy chairman and managing director, British Airways Associated Companies, Ltd.
- William Whiteman Steele, lately Inspector (SP), Board of Inland Revenue.
- William Stevens, lately Senior Careers Office (Handicapped), Salford Local Education Authority.
- Andrew Strang, MBE. For Political Service in Scotland.
- William Harold Suffield, Medical Officer, Royal Ordnance Factory, Bishopton, Ministry of Defence.
- John Grenville St. George Syms, QC, chairman, South East Region, Agricultural Land Tribunal.
- Kenneth Taylor, Chief Mechanical and Electrical Engineer, British Rail.
- John Gareth Thomas, Registrar, University of Wales.
- Frank Thorpe, Head Postmaster, Londonderry.
- Thomas William Tinsley, Director, Institute of Virology, Natural Environment Research Council.
- Eric Jack Townsend, TD, Governor and development director, Cottage & Rural Enterprises Ltd. for the Mentally Handicapped.
- Frederick James Treasure, lately Chief Clerk, Crown Court, Kingston upon Thames.
- George Tremlett, Member, Greater London Council.
- John Courtenay Trewin, Author and Drama Critic.
- Patricia Turner, National Industrial Officer and Head of Equal Rights Department, National Union of General & Municipal Workers.
- Moya Clare Tyson, Adviser for Special Education, London Borough of Hounslow.
- Marguerite Kathleen Beacham Varley, chairman, Scottish Association of Citizen's Advice Bureaux.
- Peter Robert Wall, lately Senior Principal, Home Office.
- Gilbert Ernest Cozens Watts, managing director, J. H. Fenner & Co. (Fenaplast) Ltd.
- Kenneth George Welch, deputy chairman, British Insurance Brokers' Association.
- Richard John Westlake, City Housing Officer, Birmingham City Council.
- Norah Ida Phyllis Whatley, Area Nurse, Child Health, Gwent Health Authority.
- Roy Ivor Harding Whitlock, Oral and Maxillo-Facial Surgeon, Belfast.
- Christopher Joseph Wilshere, Manager, Temporary Works Design Department, John Laing Design Associates Ltd.
- Chloe Jean, Lady Wilson, deputy director, The Royal Commonwealth Society for the Blind.
- Alexander Stewart Wood, chairman and managing director, Bruntons (Musselburgh) Ltd.
- James Brownlie Young, lately chairman, Scottish Committee. Scout Association.
- Israel Arnold Ziff. For services to the community in Leeds.

Diplomatic Service and Overseas List

- Raymond Adlam, British Council Representative, Sweden.
- Dr. John Douglas Chalmers Anderson. For medical and welfare services to the community in Afghanistan.
- John Rodrigues Anjo, MBE. For public and community services in Antigua.
- The Reverend Andrew Baillie, MBE. For services to the British community in Colombo.
- Sylvia Baverstock, lately Council Secretary, European Free Trade Association, Geneva.
- Geoffrey Albert Edward Baxter. For services to the British community in Mexico.
- David Alan Bell, British Council Representative, Ethiopia.
- Anthony Ross Carter. For services to British commercial interests in Ghana.
- William Henry James Chippendale, Honorary British Consul, San Salvador.
- Hugh Martin Collier. For services to British commercial interests in Malaysia.
- Duncan Acheson Crow, lately International Staff, NATO, Brussels.
- John Frederick Doble, First Secretary and Head of Chancery, HM Embassy, Maputo.
- Catherine Brady Dowds, MBE, lately First Secretary (Development), British High Commission, Lusaka.
- John George Gaggero, JP. For services to the community in Gibraltar.
- Dr. Dinshaw Jamshedji Ghadially. For medical services to the community in Mauritius.
- Hugh Gilmartin, HM Consul-General, Brisbane.
- Owen Eric Goddard, Consul (Commercial), HM Consulate-General, São Paulo.
- Basil Charles Harries, First Secretary (Commercial), British High Commission, Valletta.
- Keith Robert Hunter, British Council Representative, Peking.
- Henry Ralph Husband, deputy director of Housing, Hong Kong.
- Lilith Edris Kelsick, Permanent Secretary (Establishments), St. Kitts-Nevis.
- Dr. John Wingrave Landells. For services to medical education in Ethiopia.
- Dorothy Lee, MBE. For welfare services to refugees in Hong Kong.
- David Lincoln-Gordon. For services to Development in the Pacific Islands.
- Jack Charles Long, MBE, First Secretary and Consul, HM Embassy, Kuwait.
- Michael John Moore, MBE, First Secretary, HM Embassy, Beirut.
- Archibald Beadon Norman. For services to the British community in Argentina.
- Freda Darling Olivey. For services to the community in Bermuda.
- John Hugh Pain, Director, Tourist Association, Hong Kong.
- Jean Francois Perret, British Council Representative, South Africa.
- Henry Pinch. For services to British commercial interests in Tanzania.
- John Morrison Riddell-Swan, Director of Agriculture & Fisheries, Hong Kong.
- Lloyd Guy Pieere Roberts. For services to British commercial interests in Barbados.
- Lounel Nathaniel Stevens, MBE, Secretary to the Cabinet, Antigua.
- Robert Stokell. For services to British commercial interests, and the British community in Karachi.
- Thomas Fiendley Stones, lately British Council Representative, Hungary.
- Nigel John Ivo Stourton. For services to British commercial interests in Ghana.
- Spencer Francis Tachon. For services to British commercial interests in Lille.
- Leslie Reid Thornton. For services to highway development in Nepal.
- Jack Gilkison Train. For services to British interests in South Africa.
- Edward Johnson Verrill. For services to British interests in Bahrain.
- Dr. David Charles Lawrence Wacher, lately Veterinary Officer, Ministry of Agriculture, Lesotho.
- Robert James Watson. For services to British commercial interests in Indonesia.
- David Cunningham Wield, First Secretary, British High Commission, Valletta.
- Anthony Peter William Windle, HM Consul, Palma de Mallorca.
- James Wood. For services to British commercial interests in Japan.
- Dr. Clifford Desmond Wooding, Chief Medical Officer, Montserrat.

Australian States

State of Victoria

- Diane Berenice Alley. For service to women's affairs.
- Mary Evans. For service to nursing.
- Harold James Griffin. For service to the apparel manufacturing industry.
- John Robin Lanyon. For service to motor sport.
- Councillor Frederick James Maddern. For municipal service.
- Henry Gerard Alexander Osborne. For service to commerce and industry.
- Geoffrey Welchman. For service to the mentally retarded.

State of Queensland

- Douglas Costin Black. For services to the retail industry.
- The Reverend Ronald Howe. For services to the Uniting Church and the community.
- Steffie Sinclair French Melrose. For services to the meat industry.
- Councillor Peter Francis Cory Murray. For services to local government and the community.

State of South Australia

- Emeritus Professor Frank Bertram Bull. For services to engineering and to the University of Adelaide.
- Wyndham Hill-Smith. For services to the wine industry and to horse racing.

State of Western Australia

- John Barnes Ackland. For services to agriculture and the community.
- George Oswald Edwards. For services to local government.
- Patricia May Smeeton. For services to the community.

==== Members of the Order of the British Empire (MBE) ====
Military Division

Royal Navy

- Lieutenant Commander Reginald Brian Edward Bell.
- Fleet Chief Cook William Booth, M924715P.
- Lieutenant Commander Stephen Henry Bovey.
- Lieutenant Commander (SCC) James Walter Brown, Royal Naval Reserve.
- Lieutenant Commander (SCC) Matthew Woodrow Carruthers, VRD, Royal Naval Reserve.
- Fleet Chief Petty Officer (MW) Brian Edward Castle, J905893Y.
- Lieutenant Commander Ronald John Fisher.
- Fleet Chief Petty Officer Writer John Ronald Griffiths, M945114X.
- Lieutenant Commander Michael John McLoughlin.
- Lieutenant Commander John Albert Miller.
- Captain Barry Philip William Radford, Royal Marines.
- Surgeon Lieutenant Commander David Ian Riddell.
- Chaplain John Christopher Augustine Ryan.
- Lieutenant Commander George Alfred Skinner.
- Lieutenant David Thomas Sully.
- Lieutenant Commander Harold Sydney Tuffin.
- Lieutenant Commander Anthony James Wray.

Army

- Major (Quartermaster) Basil Henry Baines (477370), The Light Infantry.
- 23940639 Warrant Officer Class 2 James Herbert Barber, Corps of Royal Engineers, Territorial Army.
- 23961585 Warrant Officer Class I Ian Birchall, Royal Army Ordnance Corps.
- Major (Technical Officer Telecommunications) Donald Walter Capon (481605), Royal Corps of Signals.
- 23717960 Warrant Officer Class 2 Reginald Humphrey Carter, The Duke of Edinburgh's Royal Regiment (Berkshire & Wiltshire).
- Captain Stanley Collingwood, BEM (482593), The Yorkshire Volunteers, Territorial Army.
- Captain Stanley Arthur Cooper (498117), General List.
- Major Anthony Francis Davidson (482711), The King's Own Royal Border Regiment.
- Major Frederick Stanley Dawson, TD (473743), Royal Corps of Transport, Territorial Army.
- Major Derek James Thomas Dowey (461185), Royal Army Pay Corps.
- Major (Quartermaster) Anthony Charles Downes (490139), The Royal Anglian Regiment.
- Major John Patrick French (482728), Royal Corps of Transport.
- Major (Brevet Lieutenant Colonel) Francis Gilfedder, TD (472459), Royal Army Ordnance Corps, Territorial Army.
- Major Francis James Goddard (433115), The Cheshire Regiment.
- 23222840 Warrant Officer Class 2 Richard Thomas Gregory, 17th/21st Lancers.
- Major Richard Julian Gresty, MVO (364074), The Royal Anglian Regiment.
- Major Robert Stephen Hastings (433130), Royal Corps of Transport.
- Captain (Quartermaster) Derek Heffron (498639), Royal Corps of Transport.
- Major (Quartermaster) Eric William Herrington (487381), The Light Infantry.
- Captain Reginald Hood (505004), The Royal Regiment of Wales (24th/41st Foot).
- Major Ronald Jackson (292332), Corps of Royal Engineers (now Retd.)
- 23709615 Warrant Officer Class 2 David John James, Royal Regiment of Artillery.
- Major John Imray Johnston (472351), Royal Horse Artillery.
- Major (Quartermaster) Jack Jones (492835), The Black Watch (Royal Highland Regiment).
- Major William Alfred Morgan (372020), General List.
- Acting Captain Roy O'Callaghan (492026), Army Cadet Force, Territorial Army.
- Acting Major Montagu Albert Ormsby, MC (69271), Army Cadet Force, Territorial Army.
- 23752028 Warrant Officer Class 1 Walter James Pogue, The Royal Irish Rangers (27th (Inniskilling) 83rd & 87th).
- Major William Graham Pollock (468205), Royal Army Pay Corps.
- Major Raymond John Harold Edward Prior, TD (487722), Corps of Royal Military Police, Territorial Army.
- Major William Howell Rees, TD (450076), Royal Army Pay Corps, Territorial Army.
- 23857651 Warrant Officer Class 1 Edward Vincent George Sargent, Corps of Royal Electrical & Mechanical Engineers.
- 23658613 Warrant Officer Class 1 Graham Avery Smith, Royal Army Ordnance Corps.
- 23845038 Warrant Officer Class 1 Leon Smith, Royal Regiment of Artillery.
- Major Martin Stratton (471360), The Parachute Regiment.
- Major Raymond John Thomas (484224), Royal Army Pay Corps.
- Major Brian John Thompson (475446), Royal Army Veterinary Corps.
- Major Alan Charles Walpole (465210), Royal Regiment of Artillery.
- 23847668 Warrant Officer Class 1 David George Wills, Royal Corps of Signals.
- Major David Wood (379376), 52nd Lowland Volunteers, Territorial Army.
- Major Russell Whittall Lewis Wright (457318), Royal Regiment of Artillery.
- Major (Quartermaster) Philip John Young (494596), 16th/5th The Queen's Royal Lancers (now RARO).

Royal Air Force

- Squadron Leader John Donachy (2784288).
- Squadron Leader William Raymond Foreman (184505).
- Squadron Leader Trevor Winston Godfrey (4105194).
- Squadron Leader Norman Louis Haggett (504892).
- Squadron Leader John Tim Henington (508076).
- Squadron Leader Robert William Hooper (688905).
- Squadron Leader Peter Arthur George Leach (507962).
- Squadron Leader Philip Mitchell (685855).
- Squadron Leader Ronald William Napier (585362).
- Squadron Leader Francis Merrell Denton-Powell (684620).
- Squadron Leader Erik Julian Stapleton (608575).
- Squadron Leader Barry Todd (609347).
- Squadron Leader Derek Ellis Tuthill (4077129).
- Acting Squadron Leader Brian Thomas Higgins (207002), RAF Volunteer Reserve (Training Branch).
- Acting Squadron Leader Caradog Talfryn Jones (205959), RAF Volunteer Reserve (Training Branch).
- Flight Lieutenant John Victor Cordery, AFC (203484).
- Flight Lieutenant Raymond John Lawrence (2524780).
- Flight Lieutenant Michael Vincent Leary (508025).
- Flying Officer Robert John Abbott (3528097).
- Warrant Officer John Davis Brooks (K4012831).
- Warrant Officer William Thomas Crispin (X2725336).
- Warrant Officer Ernest George Stephen Ley (B1925157).
- Warrant Officer Edward Alexander Tombling (K4248783).

Civil Division

- John Waters Abbot, Group Superintendent Radiographer, Grampian Health Board.
- Cecil Adshead, National Dock Labour Board Manager, and Secretary, East Scotland & Aberdeen Local Dock Labour Boards.
- Alexander Robert Alexander, Higher Clerical Officer, Highland Health Board.
- Douglas Harold Allan, lately County Emergency Planning Officer, Hampshire County Council.
- John William Thomas Amey, AFC. For Political and Public Service, Greater London Area.
- Herbert Thomas Amies, lately County Drama Adviser, Shropshire.
- John Kenneth Anderson. For Political and Public Service in Scotland.
- John Ross Anderson, President, Lanarkshire Spastics Association.
- Joseph Alexander Anderson. For services to the Magistracy in Northern Ireland.
- Howard Rea Angus. For services to Real Tennis.
- Alfred Frederick Arnold. Secretary, County Down Savings Committee.
- Clifford John Asbury, Dock Superintendent, Crown Agents.
- George Gilroy Ashcroft, Residential Social Worker (Liaison Officer), Department of Health & Social Security.
- John Leslie Askew, Chief Inspector, Greater Manchester Police.
- Gwynneth Muriel Atkins. For Political and Public Service, Eastern Area.
- Ruth Barbour, Executive Officer, Northern Ireland Office.
- John William Barnes. For services to the Royal British Legion in Somerset.
- Madeleine Bristed Barry, Higher Executive Officer, Department of Health & Social Security.
- Anne Batchelor, Director, Royal Scottish Agricultural Benevolent Institution.
- Bernard William Percival Bateman, Chief Superintending Instructional Officer, Ministry of Defence.
- George Albert Baylis, lately Higher Executive Officer, Board of Inland Revenue.
- Jack Beckinsale, Stores Officer Grade B, Ministry of Defence.
- Henry John Bedser. For Political and Public Service, Wessex Area.
- George Charles Bennett, Higher Executive Officer, Department of Transport.
- William Laurie Bingham, Manager, Northern Ireland Association Football Team.
- Violet Joan Black, Secretary, Aircraft Group, British Aerospace.
- Leonard James Blackman, Senior Executive Officer, Ministry of Defence.
- Herbert Cecil Blanch, Credit Controller, Tucker Products Ltd.
- Robert Kerr Blane, Deputy Editor, The Ayr Advertiser.
- Diana Boddington (Diana Mary Richards), Stage Manager, National Theatre.
- Edward William Bradnam, lately Retail Director, H. A. Job (Dairymen).
- Ethel Brayshaw, Member, Bradford Area Road Safety Committee.
- Frederick Brearley. For Political and Public Service, Greater London Area.
- Reginald Brice, Education Officer (Schools Administration), Somerset Local Education Authority.
- Mary Briggs, General Secretary, Botanical Society of the British Isles.
- Amey Ida Bromley, Chairman of Council, Chartered Society of Physiotherapy.
- Trevor David Brooking. For services to Association Football.
- Frederick William Brooks. For services to the community in Hampshire.
- James Herbert Castle Brown, Clerk, Navy, Army & Air Force Institutes.
- Alan Bulmer, Head of Safety and Engineering Department, National Union of Mineworkers.
- Jack Blakemore Burgess, Guided Weapons Spares and Repairs Manager, Stevenage Division, British Aerospace, Dynamics Group.
- Douglas Burns, Senior Executive Officer, Department of Health & Social Security.
- John Elliott Campion, Senior Marine Surveyor, White Fish Authority/Herring Industry Board.
- Frederick George Carter, lately managing director, K.S. Pipeline Supplies Ltd.
- Edward Charles Richard Chase, Education Officer, Rochester Borstal.
- William Cheetham. For services to the Merseyside Youth Association.
- Margaret Frances Alice Child, managing director, Meetens Industrial Ltd. For services to Export.
- John George Clark, Clerical Officer, Capenhurst Works, British Nuclear Fuels Ltd.
- James Clavering, Organising Secretary, Northumbria Association of Youth Clubs.
- Joan Elizabeth Cloke. For services to the British Gliding Association.
- George Cochran, Telephone Booking Operator, Scottish Tourist Guides Association.
- Bernard (Barney) Colehan, Television Producer, British Broadcasting Corporation.
- Norman Sidney James Coles, lately Pensions Officer, Port of London Authority.
- Greville George Mullett Cook, Senior Executive Officer, Board of Customs & Excise.
- Albert Crabtree, Principal Technician, Trent Polytechnic.
- Major Dorothy Alma Crofton, WRAC (Retd.), lately Officer Grade 3, Ministry of Defence.
- Paul Cropper, Principal Viola, BBC Northern Symphony Orchestra.
- Donald Curry, Assistant Education Officer, Sheffield Local Education Authority.
- Agnes Dalzell, Divisional Nursing Officer (Community) Dumfries & Galloway Health Board.
- Edith Joan Darwin, Director of Nurse Education, Kingston & Richmond Area Health Authority.
- Henry Davenport, Chief Service Engineer, Francis Shaw & Co. Ltd. For services to Export.
- Alexander Orme Davies, BEM, lately General Manager, Traffic Controls, Plessey Controls Ltd.
- Ursula Mary Davies. For services to the community in Staffordshire.
- Allan Deakin, Construction Engineering Manager, Industrial and Marine Division, Rolls-Royce Ltd. For services to Export.
- Christopher Colin Dean. For services to Ice Dancing.
- John Arthur Dixon, Northern Area, Engineer, Pickfords Heavy Haulage Ltd.
- George Dennis Draper, lately Station Administrative Officer, Mary Tavy Group of Power Stations, South Western Region, Central Electricity Generating Board.
- Herbert William Draper. For services to the community in Shropshire.
- Edward Dunford. For political service.
- Reginald Stuart Dunn, lately Professional and Technology Officer II, Ministry of Defence.
- Thomas Cecil Dunn. For services to conservation.
- Gertrude Marion King Ede, District Organiser,. Birmingham Citizens' Advice Bureau.
- John Edge, Member, Rossendale Borough Council.
- Douglas Eley, Distribution Supervisor, Southern Water Authority.
- Florence Margaret Ellis. For Political Service, East Midlands Area.
- Vera Jane Fairclough. For services to the community particularly in Durham.
- Norman Donald Ferns, Overseas Services Engineering Adviser, Vosper Thornycroft (UK) Ltd.
- William Straiton Finlayson, Supply Officer, University Marine Biological Station, Millport, Isle of Cumbrae.
- Freda Brindella Samuel Finny, Scientific Officer, National Physical Laboratory.
- Pauline Jane Foley, Higher Executive Officer, North Eastern Circuit Office. Lord Chancellor's Department.
- Hamish Cowan Forrest, chairman, Scottish Police Federation.
- John Noel Foxon. For services to local government in Essex.
- Winifred May Francis, lately Executive Officer, Home Office.
- Doris Kathleen Froom, Voluntary Field Officer, Welsh Association of Youth Clubs.
- Arthur Malcolm Fry, Director, Royal Society of Painters in Watercolours.
- Major Charles James Galletly, TD, chairman, Knowsley, Sefton and St. Helens War Pensions Committee.
- Alan Anthony Maxwell Gardiner, lately Teacher, Sherborne Preparatory School.
- Henry George Gill, Senior Scientific Officer, Royal Greenwich Observatory, Herstmonceaux.
- Ruth Dorothy Louisa Gipps. For services to music.
- Nevil Albert Gooderson, lately Area Manager, Wimpey Asphalt Ltd.
- Marie Louise Goodman. For services to the community in Derbyshire.
- Jean Margaret Gould, City Organiser, City of Hull, Women's Royal Voluntary Service.
- Roy John Gouldsworthy, TD, Regional Officer, South-West Region, National Association of Boys' Clubs.
- John David Grainger, formerly Assistant City Architect, Bath City Council.
- Alister McArthur Green, Director, Bield Housing Association Ltd.
- Eric Arthur Vernon Greenaway, Personnel Officer, Gloucester Works, Fibres Division, Imperial Chemical Industries Ltd.
- Charles Edward Greenwood, Higher Executive Officer, Ministry of Defence.
- Alice Anne Gregory, Senior Nursing Officer (Community), Northern District, Sefton Area Health Authority.
- Henry Frederick Gregory, lately Senior Executive Officer, Department of Health & Social Security.
- Leonard Griffiths, Technical Manager, T. Williams (Drop Forgings & Tools) Ltd.
- Alfred Edward Groves, Senior Executive Officer, Department of Transport.
- Thomas Arnold Hadfield, Higher Executive Officer, Department of Employment.
- Jennifer Phyllis Hammett, Senior Personal Secretary, Department of the Environment.
- Harold Hampson, lately Higher Executive Officer, Board of Inland Revenue.
- Marjorie Mary Harborough, lately Secretary, Tavistock Clinic, London.
- Edward Hermann Page Hargreaves. For Political and Public Service, South Eastern Area.
- Donald Richard Harridge, Senior Scientific Officer, Ministry of Defence.
- William George Harrison, BEM, Chief Superintendent, Royal Ulster Constabulary.
- John Denis Harte, chairman, St. Marylebone Citizens' Advice Bureau.
- Doris Eveleigh Hawkes. For services to the community in Budleigh Salterton.
- Francis Charles Henshaw, Higher Executive Officer, Department of Employment.
- Rowland Hewison, Principal Process Supervisor, Dounreay, United Kingdom Atomic Energy Authority.
- Edith Margaret Hewit. For services to the community in Wilmslow.
- Clifford Leonard Hicks, Manager, Industrial Relations, Automobile Association.
- Joseph Henry Hill, General Manager, Yorkshire & Lincoln Trustee Savings Bank.
- Lieutenant Kenneth McAulay Hill, RN (Retd.), Superintendent, Scottish Naval, Military & Air Force Veterans' Residence, Edinburgh.
- Gabriella Eva Margaret Hirschler, Overseas Relations Consultant, Instrument Industry & Scientific Instrument Manufacturers' Association. For services to Export.
- The Reverend Canon Philip Bertram Hobbs, Church of England Chaplain, HM Prison, Gloucester.
- Allen William Hobson, Health and Safety Coordinator (Manager), Smiths Industries Aerospace & Defence Systems Co..
- Ralph Hodgson, lately Area Building Officer, Sunderland Area Health Authority.
- Dennis Holland, Deputy Commandant, Fire Service Technical College.
- Joyce Katharine Hooper. For services to music in Surrey.
- Arthur John Guy Hopkins, lately Adviser, Central Council for Physical Recreation.
- Frances Mary Howe. For services to the Magistracy in Hertfordshire.
- George Harold Hunter, lately chairman, Deeko Ltd.
- Mary Candie Hunter, Nursery Assistant, Quarry Brae Primary School, Glasgow.
- John Edwin Hurley. For services to the West Somerset Free Press.
- Frederick John Ingram. For services to the Welsh fishing industry.
- Donald Jack, Regional Collector of Taxes, Board of Inland Revenue.
- Joseph Jackson, Farmer, Church, Lancashire.
- Nannie Hamilton Jamieson. For services to music.
- John Peter Jelley, Computer and Records Officer, The General Nursing Council for England & Wales.
- Muriel Lucy Jerrett. For Political and Public Service, West Midlands Area.
- Henry Nathaniel Joel, chairman, London Taxi Benevolent Association for War Disabled.
- Edward Cecil John, Administrative Assistant, Mersey side Police.
- Colin James Jones, Head of Music Department, Abraham Darby Comprehensive School, Telford.
- David Kenrick Jones, Group Officer, No. 13 Group, South Wales, Royal Observer Corps.
- Eleanor Elizabeth Noel Jones, Headteacher, Mount Street County Primary Infants' School, Brecon.
- Morfudd Griffiths-Jones, Nursing Officer Memorial Hospital, Blaenau Ffestiniog.
- John Bradley Kane, Project Manager, Davy McKee (Minerals & Metals) Ltd. For services to Export.
- James Leslie Kellett, Technical Officer Grade II, Department of Finance, Northern Ireland.
- Tony Kerpel. For Political Service.
- John Alfred King, Director of Technical Services, Slough Borough Council.
- Ronald George King, chairman, Plymouth District Manpower Committee.
- Thomas Kenneth Kirby, Knitting Technology Adviser, Bentley Engineering Co. Ltd. For Services to Export.
- Molly Eileen Klyne, lately Senior Executive Officer, Bedford College, University of London.
- Hazel Ethel Knight, Secretary, Dereham Division, Soldiers', Sailors' & Airmen's Families Association.
- Major Andrew John Lamb, Secretary, Gateshead Guild of Community Service.
- Albert Lamont, Senior Chief Medical Laboratory Scientific Officer, Department of Haematology, Royal Victoria Hospital, Belfast.
- James Patrick Laverty, Staff Officer, Department of Health & Social Services, Northern Ireland.
- Peter Dennis Vipan Laxton, Assistant Editor, Reading Chronicle.
- Ronald Burt Lendon, Headmaster, Gospel Oak Primary School, London.
- Geoffrey Lewis, lately chairman, Orbit Housing Association Ltd.
- Frederick William Limer, chairman, Housing Services Committee, Epping Forest District Council.
- Michael John Lloyd, Chief Assistant Engineer (Construction), North Western Road Construction Unit, Cheshire Sub-Unit.
- Arthur Neville Loaring, lately Chief Executive, Wine & Spirit Trades' Benevolent Society.
- David James Lodge, General Manager, Associated Biscuits International Ltd.
- Andrew Wilson Lough, lately District Inspector, Ministry of Agriculture, Fisheries & Food.
- Alexina Low, Deputy Officer in Charge, Fergus Home for the Elderly, Dyce, Aberdeen.
- Jean Margaret Lucas. For political service.
- Millicent Barbara Marshall Lumgair, Head Teacher, Kaimes School for the Partially Sighted, Edinburgh.
- Julia Teresa Lynch, lately Nursing Officer, Royal Marsden Hospital, Sutton, Surrey.
- Thomas Stanley Lynd, lately Quarry Manager, J. T. Glover Ltd, Moneymore.
- William Bannerman McBain, Farm Manager, Conon Bridge, Ross-shire.
- Robert McCreath, President, The Royal Scottish Pipe Band Association.
- Minnie McGregor, chairman, Cumbria Supplementary Benefit Appeal Tribunal.
- Seamus McHugh, Senior Executive Officer, Department for National Savings.
- Daniel Joseph McKeever, Proprietor, McKeever Brothers.
- Fergus James Mackenzie, Area Manager, Glasgow Central, Scottish Region, British Rail.
- Kevin Joseph Anthony McKenzie, Senior Executive Officer, Board of Customs & Excise.
- Constance Gladys McLaren, Senior Nursing Officer (Community), Northern Health District, Warwickshire Area Health Authority.
- Thomas Adam McLean, Divisional Nursing Officer (Mental Handicap), Lancashire Area Health Authority.
- The Reverend Father Andrew McMahon, Director, Society of St. Dismas, Southampton.
- Elizabeth Ferguson Maither, lately Secretary, Greenock Plant, IBM United Kingdom Ltd.
- Jean Yvonne Manisier. For Political and Public service, Wessex Area.
- Harry Charles Marshall, MC, Secretary, Jockey Club Licensing Committee.
- Vernon Valentine Marshall, lately member, Policy and Resources Committee, North Yorkshire County Council.
- Ernest Philip Lewis Marson, Chief Buyer, Cossor Electronics Ltd.
- George Alfred Martin, lately chairman, River Kent Estuary Internal Drainage Board.
- Gerald Keith Marvin, Director of Sales, Glynwed Foundries Ltd.
- Margaret Mawson, Residential Child Care Officer, Sedgwick House Special School, Kendal.
- Paul Windover Millard, managing director, Ben Sayers Ltd, North Berwick.
- Elsie Christina Mary Millin. For services to the community in Swindon.
- Norah Millman, Member, Yorkshire Electricity Consultative Council.
- Edward Kennett Mills, Chief Engineer, Costing Engineering, Hatfield Division, British Aerospace, Dynamics Group.
- Harry Ming, Superintendent, Royal Ulster Constabulary.
- William John Morris, Principal Research Officer, Shirley Institute.
- William Lemon Morris, managing director, Trunk Trailers Ltd, Edinburgh.
- William Mott, Area Pharmaceutical Officer, Barnsley, Doncaster and Rotherham Area Health Authorities.
- Peter Coningsby Mullings, Programme Director and Producer, Granada Television Ltd.
- Denis Russell Mundy, lately Systems and Planning Controller, Inner London Magistrates' Courts Service.
- Agnes Maud Murphy, lately Senior Executive Officer, Department of Employment.
- Harold Edmund Naylor, Administrative Head of Teaching Staff Branch, Inner London Education Authority.
- Eric Charles William Newman, Higher Executive Officer, Board of Inland Revenue.
- Michael Nicholson, Farmer, Bucknell, Oxfordshire.
- Neva Orrell. For Political and Public service.
- Evelyn Vernica Osborne, Chief Housing Officer, Sedgemoor District Council.
- Joan Helen Owens, Head of Division, Dental Estimates Board.
- Hilda Kathleen Paine, Principal Assistant (Domiciliary), Gloucestershire County Council.
- Reginald Barnet Parke, Industrial Relations Manager, International Harvester Co. of Great Britain.
- Nora Peacock. For services to Girl Guides in West Glamorgan.
- Samuel Josiah Pearson. For services to the community in Stoke-on-Trent.
- Anthony Ernest Pease. For Political and Public service, Western Area.
- Philippa Lavinia Pennefather, Senior Executive Officer, Ministry of Defence.
- Thomas Clifford Peters, Member, Kingswood District Council.
- Joseph Marinus Petersen, Assistant Grid Maintenance Engineer, North Thames Region, British Gas Corporation.
- Robert Lawson Phelps. For services to Modern Pentathlon.
- Trevor Phillips. For Political and Public service in Wales.
- John Victor Hamilton Pickett, Senior Executive Officer, Department of Health & Social Security.
- William Pickett, Director of Publicity and Promotions, British Electrical & Allied Manufacturers' Association Ltd. For services to Export.
- Stuart Langmead Pillar, Chief Engineer, Transport Department, Blackpool Borough Council.
- Vera Alice Plumb, Executive Officer, Ministry of Defence.
- Fred Pollitt. For Political service, North Western Area.
- Lieutenant Colonel Arthur James Preston, Arena Master, Royal Tournament.
- Cahal Ramsey, Superintendent, Royal Ulster Constabulary.
- George Ernest Raymond. For services to the community in Eastleigh, Hampshire.
- Kathleen Joan Reddin, Local Organiser, Clwyd, Blood Transfusion Service.
- The Reverend Canon John Lovell Rhodes, chairman, St. John's Training Workshops Ltd, Grimsby
- Harry Richards, General Secretary, Lytham St. Annes and Fylde, Young Men's Christian Association.
- Lewis Edward Richards, MM, Commissioner, St. John Ambulance Brigade, Wales.
- John Arthur Rigden, Administration Officer, HM Prison Long Lartin.
- William Leonard Roberts. For services to the community in Warrington.
- Marjorie Mathieson Robson, County Catering Officer, Staffordshire, County Council.
- John Patrick Gerard Rogerson, General Medical Practitioner, Whitchurch, Shropshire.
- Barry Rose, Publisher.
- Roderick Guillet Ross, Inspector, Metropolitan Police.
- Patrick George Rust, Chief Executive, Wychavon District Council.
- Gladys Saint, Divisional Nursing Officer (Community), Durham Health District, Durham Area Health Authority.
- Margaret Sale, Theatre Sister, Stoke Mandeville Hospital, Buckinghamshire Area Health Authority.
- Barbara Scholes, Head Teacher, Glodwick Infant School, Oldham.
- George Leslie Scott, Principal Fire Control Officer, Fire Authority for Northern Ireland.
- Wyndham Cooper Scott, Town Clerk, Ards Borough Council, Northern Ireland.
- Dilys Shepphard, Senior Nursing Officer, Newham Health District, City & East London Area Health Authority.
- William Brown Simpson, Provost, Nithsdale District Council.
- Halford Timewell Skinner. For services to St. Mary Abbots Church, Kensington.
- James William Skinner, Member, Darlington Borough Council.
- John Vincent Slinger, Director, Select Gauges (CPG) Ltd. For services to Export.
- George Watt Fairfull Smith, MC, General Dental Practitioner, Glasgow.
- John Smith. For services to music in West Yorkshire.
- Joseph Francis Smith, Clerical Officer, Department of Employment.
- Joyce Mallalieu Bickford-Smith, chairman, Cornwall Disabled Association.
- Roy Stanley Soles, Assistant Area Surveyor, Oxfordshire County Council.
- Ivan Spence, lately Chief Internal Auditor, Greater Manchester Passenger Transport Executive.
- Joseph Spencer, chairman, Cardiac Recorders Ltd.
- Marion Staddon, Centre Organiser and Commandant, Durham Branch, British Red Cross Society.
- Edward Arthur Stamp, Production Manager, British Hovercraft Corporation Ltd.
- Joan Louise Stemp, Executive Secretary, British Jewellery & Giftware Federation.
- Reginald Royston Stevenson, Higher Executive Officer, Board of Customs & Excise.
- John Park Stewart, Consultant and Adviser, Bristol-Bordeaux Exchange.
- Sybil Mary Stockley, Principal, Ipswich School of Radiography.
- Ruby Ethel Stoltenhoff, lately Higher Executive Officer, Tate Gallery.
- Catherine Vere Stubbs. For services to the community in Lincolnshire.
- John Joseph Ernest Swaffield, Senior Traffic Superintendent, British Telecom Services & Performance Department, Post Office.
- John Rowland Swain, BEM, assistant director, Coventry & District Engineering Employers' Association.
- Violet Mary Swain. For Political and Public service, Yorkshire area.
- Charles Joseph Taylor. For services to the Boys Brigade in Birmingham.
- Robert William Taylor. For services to Cricket.
- Ronald Whittaker Taylor, Headmaster, Midfield Primary School, St. Paul's Cray.
- Euphemia Hughes Telford, lately Executive Officer, Office of the Procurator Fiscal, Greenock.
- James Frederick John Thomas. For services to sport for the mentally handicapped.
- Lawrence Arthur Thomas. For Political and Public service, Northern area.
- Commander Morgan Joseph Thomas, RN (Retd.), Professional Technology Officer Grade I, Ministry of Defence.
- Lieutenant Commander Charles Thomson, RN (Retd.), Regional Director, National Coastal Rescue Training Centre, Aberavon.
- Raymond Ralph Tisdale, Chief Commandant, Warwickshire Special Constabulary.
- Jayne Torvill. For services to Ice Dancing.
- Robert George Townsend. For services to Atlas Products & Services Ltd.
- Frederick James Treen, DFC, Manager, Military Accounts, Electrical & Musical Industries Ltd.
- Ellen Florence Tucker. For services to the community in Abertillery.
- Stanley Wilfred Tucker, Coaching Superintendent, Coaching Unit, Western National Omnibus Co. Ltd.
- Grace Barren Tulloch, Clerical Officer, Department of Trade.
- Albert Edward Turnbull, Chief Accountant, Regional Accounting Office, National Coal Board.
- James Aubrey Turner, Manager, Microwave Field Effect Transistor Department, Plessey Research (Caswell) Ltd.
- The Reverend William James Vance, Prison Chaplain, HM Prison, Belfast.
- Doreen Vause, Headteacher, Cedars County Infant School, Blackburn.
- Thomas Percival Veitch, Secretary, Kent & Sussex Exporters Club. For services to Export.
- Cyril Ernest Wade, Administrative Officer, Estate Department, British Waterways Board.
- Sonia May Wain, Fire Control Officer, Kent Fire Brigade.
- Heather Walters. For services to disabled people in Dorset.
- William Edward Ward, Secretary, Lighthouse Club.
- Constance Waugh. For services to youth in County Durham.
- Anne Weir, Visiting Teacher of Physical Education, Skye.
- The Reverend Michael Robin Welch, Member, Portsmouth Disablement Advisory Committee.
- William Frank Wendes. For services to the Scout Association in Newport, Isle of Wight.
- William Edward Whittle, BEM, lately Assistant Airport Director (Development), Manchester Airport.
- Leslie Gordon Whyte, Director, Whyte's Airport Services Ltd.
- John Williams, Clerk to the Trustees, Queen Mary Hospital, Roehampton.
- William Arthur Williams, lately Personnel and Administration Manager, Passenger Division, The Peninsular & Oriental Steam Navigation Company.
- Peter Kincaid Willmott. For services to horticultural education.
- Betty Fawcett Wilson, Area Organiser, Cumbria and Lancashire, Women's Royal Voluntary Service.
- David Ian Talbot Wilson, General Medical Practitioner, Blandford.
- Alan Page-Wood, Agricultural Advisory Officer Grade II, Ministry of Agriculture, Fisheries & Food.
- William Steele Wood, Senior Sector Scientific Adviser, Caledonian Sector, United Kingdom Warning & Monitoring Organisation.
- George Henry William Woodhouse. For Political and Public Service, Western Area.

Diplomatic Service and Overseas List

- Richard Edward Arch. For public and community services in the Cayman Islands.
- Wilhelmina Armantrading. For services to the community in St. Kitts-Nevis.
- Kathleen Esther Barker. For services to education in Hong Kong.
- Joaquin Bensusan, Museum Curator, Gibraltar.
- Mary Bradfield, Political Affairs Officer, HM Embassy, Stockholm.
- Agnes Blyth Brown. For nursing and welfare services to the community in the Gambia.
- Herbert George Brown, lately Administration Officer, British High Commission, Maseru.
- Mary Casciaro, Health Visitor, Child Welfare Department, Gibraltar.
- Ronald Harry George Checketts, lately Attache, HM Embassy, Baghdad.
- Brian Charles Collier, Higher Executive Officer, HM Embassy, Washington.
- Jeffrey Parker Collinge. For services to the British community in the Netherlands.
- Henry Patrick Gordon Comber, Second Secretary, HM Embassy, Havana.
- Denyse Muriel Annie Cooke. For service to British commercial interests in France.
- Patricia Fionuala Coxon, Assistant Administration Officer, British Consulate-General, Rio de Janeiro.
- Donald Stanley Cruikshank, Second Secretary (Consular), British High Commission, Port of Spain.
- Ivan Courtenay Ambrose Cunningham. For services to the community in Bermuda.
- Thomas Murray Denoon. For services to agricultural development in Korea.
- Thomas Vivian Gwynne Duggan. For services to British ex-servicemen in South Africa.
- David Wolfe Fitzwilliam, lately First Secretary (Administration) United Kingdom Mission to the United Nations, Geneva.
- Dr. Jennifer Mary Gibson. For medical and welfare services to the community in Sierra Leone.
- Philip John Given, Commercial Officer, HM Embassy, Paris.
- Mary Elaine Goodfellow. For services to the community in Zambia.
- Philippa Frances Guillebaud. For welfare services to the community in the Sudan.
- Peter Andrew Heald, Second Secretary and Consul, HM Embassy, Warsaw.
- Susan Elizabeth Hogwood, Archivist, HM Embassy, Luanda.
- George Hornby, Assistant Representative, British Council, Italy.
- Margaret Winifred Jeffery, Assistant Information Officer, British High Commission, Wellington.
- Wong-fat Lau. For public services in Hong Kong.
- John Frederick Linennen, Superintendent, Health Inspectorate, Hong Kong.
- Chi-chung Lo, Senior Liaison Officer, New Territories Administration, Hong Kong.
- Jeffrey Charles Dominic March!, Second Secretary (Administration), British High Commission, Lagos.
- John Marshall, lately Interpreter, International Staff, NATO, Brussels.
- Donald Edward Joseph Morton. For services to British aviation interests in Washington.
- Patrick Bernard O'Callaghan, Advisor to Government Printer, Solomon Islands.
- Nydia Maria Pereira, Court Reporter, Judiciary Department, Hong Kong.
- Janetta Poulsen, Accounts Clerk, HM Embassy, Copenhagen.
- Charles Peter Price, lately First Secretary (Commercial), British High Commission, Georgetown.
- Graham John Pulfer. For services to British commercial interests in Nigeria.
- Nellie Ramoni. For services to the British community in Buenos Aires.
- Elsie Randell. For nursing services to the community in Lusaka.
- George Ranson, lately Chief Explosives Officer, Labour Department (Mines Division), Hong Kong.
- Emily Rowntree. For nursing services to the community in Angola.
- John Russell, lately Third Secretary (Commercial), HM Embassy, Warsaw.
- William Hugh Harry Sanders, lately First Secretary (Administration), HM Embassy, Ankara.
- Douglas Sim. For services to forestry development in Ethiopia.
- Jack Simmons, Second Secretary and Vice-Consul, HM Embassy, Baghdad.
- Clarence Smith, Local Constable, Salt Island, British Virgin Islands.
- Ira Smith, BEM, Government Agent, Anegada, British Virgin Islands.
- Olive Margaret Strevens (Mrs. Mazloumdan). For services to the British community in Aleppo.
- Peter John Bernard Taylor. For services to the British community in Saudi Arabia.
- Victor Harold Twyford. For services to British commercial interests and the community in Nigeria.
- Betty Doreen Watson, Accounts Assistant, British High Commission, Salisbury.
- Valerie Mary Wehmeyer, Personal Assistant to HM Consul-General Düsseldorf.
- Mary Layard White. For welfare services to the community in Tumelong, Pretoria.
- Thomas Christopher White, lately Assistant English Language Officer, British Council, Indonesia.
- Kenneth Winston. For services to the British community in Kuwait.
- Geoffrey Mou-Tsen Yeh. For public and community services in Hong Kong.
- Stephen Mok-shing Yow. For services to the community in Hong Kong.

Australian States

State of Victoria

- Albion Richard Appleby. For community service.
- James Irvine Crockett, MC. For service to industry.
- George Herbert O'Dell Crowther. For community service.
- William Andrew Cuddihy. For community service.
- Councillor Sheila Mary Ferguson. For community service.
- Frederick John Grundy. For community service.
- James Haw. For municipal service.
- Freda Mary Howy Irving. For service to journalism.
- Martha Jacobson. For community service.
- Colin Edwin Johnston. For service to ex-Servicemen.
- Arnold Ernest Judd. For municipal service.
- Laurie William Mason. For municipal service.
- Sydney Cameron Mills. For municipal service.
- Dr. Alan William Richards. For public service.
- Alwin John Robinson. For service to hospital administration.
- Marjorie Tipping. For service to the arts.

State of Queensland

- Martha Behm. For services to the community.
- Barbara Elizabeth Bowers. For services to the community.
- Colin Harry Clay. For service to handicapped people.
- Vivian William Dowling, QFM. Recently Chief Officer, Brisbane Metropolitan Fire Brigade.
- Andrew Fordyce. For services to the community.
- Thalia Ruby Lorraine Kennedy. For services to education and the community.
- The Reverend Allan Charles Male. For services to the Churches of Christ and to the community.
- Graham Edward McCamley. For services to the beef cattle industry.

State of South Australia

- Dr. Nelly Hooper Ludbrook. For services to science.
- Alexander Douglas McClure. For services to local government.

State of Western Australia

- Ivy Elfreeda Firstenberg. For services to Guiding.
- Brian Newton King. For services to Lions Clubs International.
- Maxine Claire Macdonald. For services to the community.
- James Matthew Price, JP. For services to the community.
- Arthur John Williams. For services to the University of Western Australia.

=== Order of the Companions of Honour (CH) ===
- The Right Honourable Edward Charles Gurney, Baron Boyle of Handsworth. For public service.
- Frederick Sanger, CBE. For services to biochemistry.

=== Companions of the Imperial Service Order (ISO) ===
Home Civil Service

- David James Atherton, Principal, Department of the Environment.
- Howard Beardsmore, lately Chief Electricity Meter Examiner, Department of Energy.
- Harry James Brown, Principal, Department of Health & Social Services, Northern Ireland.
- David Charles Callus, Senior Assistant Valuer, Rating of Government Property Department.
- George Dingwall, Governor Class I, HM Prison, Peterhead.
- Thomas Arthur Dorling, Principal Scientific Officer, Warren Spring Laboratory, Department of Industry.
- Kenneth Fletcher, HM Deputy Superintending Inspector of Factories, Department of Employment.
- Robert Haydn Fletcher, RD, lately Principal, Ministry of Defence.
- Charles William Hackett, lately Principal Examiner, Patent Office.
- James Harold Hartley, Principal, Department of Health & Social Security.
- Geoffrey James Judge, Principal, HM Procurator General & Treasury Solicitor.
- Gordon Henry Leese, ERD, lately Principal, Department of Health & Social Security.
- Allan James Lucas, Foreign & Commonwealth Office.
- John Francis Milton, lately Principal Scientific Officer, Ministry of Defence.
- Herbert George Pearson, lately Principal, Home Office.
- Joan Eileen Phipps, lately Principal, Ministry of Defence.
- Henry Thomas Reading, Principal, Paymaster General's Office.
- William Alun Charles Richards, Principal Professional Technology Officer, Ministry of Defence.
- Edward Thomas Taylor, deputy director, National Investment & Loans Office..
- Stanley Harold Thompson, Principal, South-Eastern Circuit Office, Lord Chancellor's Department.
- Arnold George Henry Voss, lately Senior Principal, Department of Employment.
- Norman David Wolf, Principal, Department of Education & Science.

Diplomatic Service and Overseas List

- Stanley Arthur Barden, lately Principal Government Engineer, Public Works Department, Hong Kong.
- Kenneth Evans, Principal Executive Officer New Territories Administration, Hong Kong.
- Stanley Charles Pascoe, Principal Executive Officer, Medical & Health Department, Hong Kong.
- Brian Desmond Joseph Welch, MBE, Senior Welfare Officer, Royal Hong Kong Police Force.

Australian States

State of Victoria

- Maurice Stanley Jeans, Secretary, Department of Labour & Industry.
- Colin Edward Middleton, Secretary, Department of Crown Lands & Survey.

=== British Empire Medals (BEM) ===
Military Division

Royal Navy

- Sergeant Michael Stanley Alexander, P025929B, Royal Marines.
- Chief Petty Officer (OPS)(M) Michael Leonard Atkin, J972397H.
- Local Sergeant George Frederick Basford, P017887F, Royal Marines.
- Chief Radio, Supervisor Brian Norman Davies, KD986009Q, Royal Naval Reserve.
- Chief Petty Officer (OPS)(S) Terence Davison, D068745B.
- Colour Sergeant (CS) William Frederick James Denman, P009455H, Royal Marines.
- Chief Marine Engineering Artificer (P) Nigel George Folley, D050084X.
- Chief Petty Officer Writer Ian Malcolm Frederick Gillard, M972340A.
- Petty Officer (EW) Anthony John Willoughby Herbert, D079845K.
- Local Acting Chief Weapon Engineering Mechanician (O) James Higgins, M888395K.
- Chief Petty Officer Writer Gerald Randolph Jarvis, M981824Y.
- Chief Petty Officer (Deck) James McKechnie Laird, Royal Fleet Auxiliary.
- Sergeant Anthony James Luckens, P021194Q, Royal Marines.
- Local Acting Chief Marine Engineering Mechanician (L) Anthony James McDermott, M982573J.
- Chief Wren Telephonist Veronica McMahon, W125550P.
- Petty Officer Cook Trevor Brian Newman, D050280U.
- Master At Arms John Rodney Pakeman, D053632X.
- Petty Officer Motorman Samuel Edward Rafferty, Royal Fleet Auxiliary.
- Chief Petty Officer Stores Accountant Donald Anthony Read, ZD985048Y, Royal Naval Reserve.
- Chief Petty Officer Marine Engineering Mechanic (M) Roger Charles Round, D055463T.
- Chief Petty Officer (MW) Michael Vickers, P058832H.
- Chief Radio Supervisor Neil Walker, QD981965X, Royal Naval Reserve.
- Musician David John Lewis Waters, Q002901J, Royal Marines.
- Air Engineering Artificer (M)l Stephen Reginald Williams, F977947N.

Army

- 24010580 Corporal (Acting Sergeant) Frederick Alexander, Royal Corps of Signals.
- 24136613 Sergeant John Anderson, Corps of Royal Electrical & Mechanical Engineers.
- 23863543 Staff Sergeant Leonard Anderson, The Gordon Highlanders.
- 23935505 Staff Sergeant David Baggaley, Army Physical Training Corps.
- 21150301 Staff Sergeant (Local Warrant Officer Class 2) Balkrishna Rai, Queen's Gurkha Signals.
- 23938826 Staff Sergeant Terence Liam Barber, Intelligence Corps.
- 23702163 Sergeant Gordon Beavers, The King's Own Royal Border Regiment.
- 24000710 Sergeant Richard Henry Bond, Irish Guards.
- W/391880 Private (Acting Sergeant) Marjorie Mavis Booker, Women's Royal Army Corps.
- 23982017 Sergeant Rodney Martin Brown, Corps of Royal Engineers.
- 24002493 Staff Sergeant (Acting Warrant Officer Class 2) Clive Bugg, The King's Regiment.
- 24066313 Corporal Eamonn Byrne, Corps of Royal Engineers.
- 24021748 Staff Sergeant Kenneth Gordon Carter, Army Physical Training Corps.
- 24127574 Sergeant Raymond George Cartwright, Royal Corps of Signals.
- 24132149 Sergeant Anthony John Cheesman, Royal Corps of Transport.
- 24139141 Staff Sergeant John Christal, Royal Corps of Transport.
- W/391133 Staff Sergeant (Acting Warrant Officer Class 2) Margaret Cox, Women's Royal Army Corps, Territorial Army.
- 22566582 Sergeant Frederick Semm Croft, Officers Training Corps, Territorial Army.
- 23746292 Staff Sergeant Edward David Dent, Corps of Royal Engineers.
- 23474746 Sergeant Geoffrey Dougall, Coldstream Guards.
- 24206903 Sergeant Raymond Kenneth Edge, Royal Corps of Signals.
- 22950244 Staff Sergeant Peter Wood Elder, Royal Tank Regiment.
- 24008472 Staff Sergeant Donald Kenneth Lawrence Felton, Corps of Royal Engineers.
- 22119611 Staff Sergeant Laurence Frank Ferguson, Royal Army Medical Corps, Territorial Army.
- 24027112 Staff Sergeant Barrie John Fisk, Royal Army Ordnance Corps.
- 23955249 Sergeant (Acting Staff Sergeant) David Malcolm Fullard, The Royal Scots Dragoon Guards (Carabiniers & Greys).
- 23820012 Staff Sergeant Patrick Liam Gethin, Royal Corps of Signals.
- 24068175 Staff Sergeant Frederick John Hair, Corps of Royal Engineers.
- 24206248 Corporal (Acting Sergeant) Robert Graham Harrison, Royal Corps of Signals.
- 24128021 Corporal David James Hawkins, The Duke of Edinburgh's Royal Regiment (Berkshire & Wiltshire).
- 23355418 Sergeant Owen Michael Higgins, Royal Corps of Transport.
- 22546949 Staff Sergeant (Local Warrant Officer Class 2) Philip Hogan, Royal Corps of Transport.
- 24027652 Staff Sergeant (Acting Warrant Officer Class 2) Geoffrey Hoyland, Royal Army Ordnance Corps.
- 22614649 Corporal (Acting Staff Sergeant) Charles Arthur Humphries, Royal Corps of Transport.
- 24051515 Staff Sergeant Peter John Hurstell, Royal Army Medical Corps.
- 24195914 Corporal William Ireland, Royal Corps of Signals.
- 23319022 Sergeant John Frederick Jackson, Corps of Royal Electrical & Mechanical Engineers, Territorial Army.
- 23962159 Sergeant (Acting Staff Sergeant) Stuart William Jackson, Royal Army Ordnance Corps.
- 23534710 Staff Sergeant (Acting Warrant Officer Class 2) Michael Joseph Johnston, Royal Corps of Transport.
- 21155233 Sergeant Krishnabahadur Rai, 10th Princess Mary's Own Gurkha Rifles (now discharged).
- 23991021 Staff Sergeant Clifford William Lee, Royal Army Ordnance Corps.
- 23223543 Staff Sergeant Harry Frank Lland, Royal Corps of Transport, Territorial Army.
- 24327222 Sergeant Charles George Malcolm Macklin, The Royal Highland Fusiliers (Princess Margaret's Own Glasgow & Ayrshire Regiment).
- 24005737 Staff Sergeant Charles Anthony McLaughlin, The Light Infantry.
- 23896020 Staff Sergeant David William Morris, The Light Infantry.
- 23657580 Bombardier (Acting Sergeant) William Albert Windsor Mountcastle, Royal Regiment of Artillery.
- 23217875 Staff Sergeant David Elias Newitt, The Devonshire & Dorset Regiment (now discharged).
- 21158904 Sergeant Ombahadur Chhetri, 7th Duke of Edinburgh's Own Gurkha Rifles.
- 23532388 Corporal Anthony John Pierce, The Royal Green Jackets.
- 24092029 Sergeant Ronald Laing Purfitt, Royal Army Ordnance Corps.
- 22136869 Sergeant James Robert Randerson, The Yorkshire Volunteers, Territorial Army.
- 23949288 Staff Sergeant Ronald James Saggers, Royal Corps of Transport.
- 23990783 Staff Sergeant (Acting Warrant Officer Class 2) Trevor Michael Sheriff, Army Catering Corps.
- 24187139 Sergeant David James Stearn, Royal Army Veterinary Corps.
- 22442266 Corporal Reginald Rex Stobbart, Army Catering Corps, Territorial Army.
- 23782693 Sergeant Arthur John Sullivan, Royal Corps of Transport.
- 24198838 Corporal Nicholas Ralph Thompson, Royal Army Ordnance Corps.
- 23742108 Staff Sergeant (Acting Warrant Officer Class 2) Leo Patrick Tighe, Irish Guards.
- 23938774 Sergeant Michael Turnbull, The King's Own Royal Border Regiment.
- 24027504 Staff Sergeant Alan Michael Vanstone, Royal Army Ordnance Corps.
- 24402638 Corporal Lawrence William Walbran, Intelligence Corps.
- 23505403 Staff Sergeant James Walmsley, The Parachute Regiment.
- 23982116 Staff Sergeant (Acting Warrant Officer Class 2) Charles Oliver Webb, Corps of Royal Engineers.
- 23889353 Sergeant Tony Williams, Royal Army Medical Corps.
- 24262690 Staff Sergeant Robert Anthony Young, Royal Corps of Transport.
- 23548366 Bombardier (Acting Sergeant) William Yule, Royal Regiment of Artillery.

Overseas Award

- Staff Sergeant Yuk Lee, Royal Hong Kong Regiment (The Volunteers).
- Staff Sergeant Ping-Wan Luk, Royal Hong Kong Regiment (The Volunteers).
- Corporal Edward Paul Peuster, Royal Hong Kong Regiment (The Volunteers).

Royal Air Force

- N0593943 Flight Sergeant David Andrew Angood.
- T0585004 Flight Sergeant Thomas Martin Bastick.
- V0589734 Flight Sergeant Peter Arthur Blythe.
- M0589746 Flight Sergeant Brian George Elgar.
- P0684823 Flight Sergeant Arthur James Ernest Feist.
- G4264260 Flight Sergeant William Frederick Grant.
- A4251260 Flight Sergeant Michael David Lamb, RAF Regiment.
- Fl936789 Flight Sergeant Brian Peter Wilks.
- PI923780 Chief Technician Peter Henry Gore.
- D4249784 Chief Technician Ian Bruce Muir.
- P0683951 Chief Technician Roy Frederick Pond.
- A0685790 Chief Technician Edward James Thompson.
- R0683605 Chief Technician Gordon Kenneth Peter Will.
- S4268863 Sergeant Stewart Hendry Howie.
- R4169532 Sergeant Kenneth Porter.
- W4257766 Sergeant Terence Gilbert Pringle.
- N1949378 Sergeant Gilbert Ridley.
- Y4265324 Sergeant Tony Howard Williams.
- G1950519 Sergeant Thomas Leslie Woods.
- T1946267 Sergeant Graham York.
- X4276836 Corporal Richard Alun Bebb.

Civil Division

- Andreas Agathangelou, Clerk Grade 1, Cyprus, Ministry of Defence.
- Albert Edward Allen, Joiner, Yorkshire & Humberside Territorial Auxiliary & Volunteer Reserve Association.
- Christina Catherine Axe, Process Worker, Hotpoint Ltd.
- Arthur Bailey, Sergeant, Lancashire Constabulary.
- Thomas Henry Victor Bailie, Sub Officer, Fire Authority for Northern Ireland.
- Frederick Thomas Baker, Town Crier and Beadle, Stratford-on-Avon Town Council.
- Gary Barker, Maintenance and Security Officer, Leicestershire Museums & Art Galleries Service.
- Winifred Olive Barlow, Technician 1, Department of Mechanical & Electrical Engineering, Greater London Council.
- Amy Barrowclough. For services to the visually handicapped in Huddersfield.
- Sydney Robert Batty, Supervisor (Telecommunications), York, Eastern Region, British Rail.
- John Nicholas Bavin, lately Foreman Bricklayer, Lincolnshire County Council.
- Arthur Bedford, Foreman, J. Bibby Edible Oils Ltd. For Services to Export.
- David Bennett, Sergeant, Royal Ulster Constabulary.
- James Donaldson Blues, College Services Officer, Scottish College of Textiles, Galashiels.
- Gordon George Borley, Superintendent C-130 Aircraft Inspector, Marshall of Cambridge (Engineering) Ltd.
- Leslie Boughton, Senior Maintenance Engineer and Chargehand, Healings Flour Mills, Tewkesbury.
- Alun Rhys Bowen, lately Officer-in-Charge, Earlswood Home, Surrey Area Health Authority.
- Langdon Robert Bowhay, Surveyor Grade 3, Ordnance Survey.
- Robert Boyle, Repository Assistant I, Department of Finance for Northern Ireland.
- John Bradley, Constable, Strathclyde Police.
- Patrick Michael Brodbin, Plant Manager, Howard Doris Ltd, Loch Kishorn.
- Leslie William Brotherhood, Leading Fireman, London Fire Brigade.
- Jeffrey Brian Peter Butcher, Chief Steward Grade I, Ministry of Defence.
- Mary Campbell, Sub-postmistress, Belfast Head Post Office, The Post Office.
- Edna Joan Carr, Assembly Supervisor, Beaufort Air-Sea Equipment Ltd, Birkenhead.
- James Alfred Castle, Foreign & Commonwealth Office.
- George William Challenger, Chief Officer I, HM Prison, Wakefield.
- Ernest Herbert Charrington, lately Chief Service Mechanic, The Parker Pen Company Ltd.
- Henning Report Child, Workshop Technician, Department of Biomedical Engineering, The Institute of Orthopaedics.
- Alexander Gumming Clark, Curator of Grounds, University of Dundee.
- Leslie Harry Rock Claxton, Chief Officer I, HM Prison, Cardiff.
- Rosina Maud Cleary, Messenger, Board of Customs & Excise.
- John Samuel Collins, Aircraft Fitter, Royal Navy Aircraft Yard, Fleetlands, Ministry of Defence.
- Charles William Conde, Station Warden, RAF Henlow, Ministry of Defence.
- Catherine Mclnally Connelly, lately Inspectress, Hillington Factory, Rolls-Royce Ltd.
- David Thomas Cook, Professional and Technology Officer Grade III, HM Dockyard, Devonport, Ministry of Defence.
- David James Cox, Coxswain, Wells Life-Boat, Royal National Lifeboat Institution.
- Kenneth Maurice Cox, Production Superintendent, Ewart Chainbelt Company Ltd, Derby. For services to Export.
- George Richard Crabbe, Office Messenger, Sir William Reardon Smith & Sons Ltd, Cardiff.
- Lesley Craig, School Crossing Patrol, Greater Manchester County Council.
- William Charles Curtis. For services to the community in Watchfield, Wiltshire.
- John Daily, Foreman (Meter Reading), South of Scotland Electricity Board.
- Jessie Russell Dale. For services to the community in Crosslaw, Lanarkshire.
- Harold William Davey. For services to the community in County Down.
- David Teify Davies, Deputy Commissioner, Mid-Glamorgan County, St. John Ambulance Brigade.
- Freda Mary Dawe, Supervisor, Suture Braiding Unit, James Pearsall & Company Ltd, Taunton. For services to Export.
- Thomas Dawson, Constable, West Yorkshire Metropolitan Police.
- Thomas Dennison. For services to the Samuel Lithgow Boys' Club.
- Robert Denver, Sub-Officer, Fire Authority for Northern Ireland.
- Thomas Devine, Electrician, Liverpool City Transport.
- William Loos Dickie, Postman, Isle of Arran, The Post Office.
- John William James Digwood, Industrial Estate Warden, Runcorn Development Corporation.
- William Fittis Douglas, Sergeant Major Instructor, South Ockendon & Grays Detachments, Essex, Army Cadet Force.
- George Duggan, Messenger, Home Office.
- Kathleen Mary Dun. For services to the community in Melrose.
- Frederick Arthur Durbin, Sergeant, Avon & Somerset Constabulary.
- Pamela Wenda Margaret Eames. For services to the community in Surrey.
- Arthur Frederick Eddleston, Constable, Metropolitan Police.
- Major Charles Thomas Eddy, Company Commander, Southwark, Church Lads Brigade.
- Aelwyn Jones Evans, Leading Ambulanceman, Gwynedd Area Health Authority.
- Arthur William Frederick Evans, Sergeant, South Wales Constabulary.
- Hilda Mercy Evenett, lately Matron, Reed's School, Cobham, Surrey.
- Betty Gladys Ewens, Secretary, Hatfield-Chester Division, British Aerospace.
- Walter Faulder, Sub Officer, Cumbria Fire Brigade.
- Violet Beatrice Ferguson, Centre Organiser, Northern Ireland Branch, British Red Cross Society.
- James Bernard Firth, Manager, H. O'Bryan & Son Ltd, Royal Military Academy, Sandhurst.
- Fred Flint, Training Officer, Linby Colliery, South Nottinghamshire Area, National Coal Board.
- Peter Fordham Foan, Chauffeur, Confederation of British Industry.
- Gladys Eileen Fraser, Office Attendant, Port of London Authority.
- Albert Frost, Development Worker, North Gawber Colliery, Barnsley Area, National Coal Board.
- Ronald Peter Gale, District Service Officer, Dorset & Bournemouth Area, Southern Region, British Gas Corporation.
- Julio Garcia, Leading Operative, HM Dockyard, Gibraltar, Ministry of Defence.
- Edward Cecil Garner, Postal Executive 'D', South-East District, London Postal Region, The Post Office.
- David Wilson Gordon, Commandant, St. Andrew's Ambulance Association.
- Florence Mary Green, Sub-postmistress, Stoke Bruerne, Midland Postal Region, The Post Office.
- James Edward Green, lately Foreign & Commonwealth Office.
- Michael Arthur Fredrick Green, Fireman, London Fire Brigade.
- Gerald Douglas Griffin, Detective Constable, Belfast Harbour Police Force.
- George Guille, Maintenance Officer, Island Footpaths, Sark, Channel Islands.
- Coral Guthrie, Production Operative, Bankfield Division, GKN Sankey Ltd., Bilston.
- George Hackett, Telephone Operator, Department of Employment.
- Kenneth Hammond, General Foreman, Tinsley Viaduct, Sheffield Contract, Cleveland Bridge Company.
- Albert William Harding, Driver, West Midlands Police.
- Maurice Hardy, Chargehand Fitter, Brush Electrical Machines Ltd. For services to Export.
- Peter Joseph Harris. For services to prison aftercare in Hammersmith.
- Frederick William Charles Harvey, Civilian Instructional Officer Grade I, Royal School of Military Engineering, Ministry of Defence.
- Edna Grace Haste. For services to mentally handicapped children in Leiston and Saxmundham.
- Gordon Leslie Hawes, Senior Foreman, Cory Associated Warehouses.
- Doris Hawkins, lately Leading Hand/Assembler, Plessey Hydraulics Ltd, Swindon.
- Robert Hayes, Bandmaster, Tyneside Band Corps.
- Ivan Henry Hay Ward, Foreman (F1) (Engineering), Isle of Wight District, Southern Electricity Board.
- Edith Margaret Headford, Chief Photoprinter, HM Stationery Office.
- Laurence Heaps, Groundsman, Chorley Parklands High School, Chorley.
- Reginald Kendal Henderson, Club Supervisor, HMS Raleigh, Navy, Army & Air Force Families Institutes.
- Eileen Ethel Holroyd, Deputy County Organiser, Durham, Women's Royal Voluntary Service.
- Raymond Price Hook, Process and General Supervisory Grade 'C', Royal Ordnance Factory, Glascoed, Ministry of Defence.
- William Ronald Horton, Guard, Cardiff, Western Region, British Rail.
- Charles William House, Maintenance Gang, Wiltshire County Council.
- Eileen Laura Elizabeth Howarth, School Care Worker, Islington Schools.
- Alan Howes. For services to farmworkers in Norfolk.
- Harry William Hunnaball, Sector Service Manager, South Anglia Area, Eastern Region, British Gas Corporation.
- Percy Montague Hutchinson, Cashier, Roadline UK Ltd.
- William Scirving Jameson, Cleaner, Scottish Regalia, Edinburgh.
- Cyril Henry Jeffery, Roadworker, Oxfordshire County Council.
- Alma Jinks, Club Manager, Buller Barracks, Aldershot, Navy, Army & Air Force Families Institutes.
- George William Johnston, Fireman, Fire Authority for Northern Ireland.
- Ronald Knights, Yard Foreman, Eastern British Road Services Ltd.
- Ivor John Nott Lake, Foreman Carpenter, South-West Water Authority.
- Adrian Lindop, Constable, Cheshire Constabulary.
- James Little, Janitor/Cleaner, Craigbank School for the Mentally Handicapped, Saltcoats.
- Lily Dorothy Lovick, Craftswoman Packer, Lee Valley Experimental Horticultural Station.
- Betty Elinda Lumley, District Organiser, North East Derbyshire, Women's Royal Voluntary Service.
- William McCord, Senior Storeman, Ministry of Defence.
- Mary McGinley, Senior Mess Room Maid, Strathclyde Hospital, Motherwell.
- Marjory Jane Maclean. For services to the community, particularly the homeless, in Edinburgh.
- William McShane, Head Driver, Department of the Environment.
- Geoffrey William Marshall, Senior Coal Inspector, Opencast Executive, National Coal Board.
- Antony Martin, Chargehand, HMS Nelson, Ministry of Defence.
- Audrey Palmer Mason, Centre Organiser, Hainford/Hellesdon Centre, Norfolk Branch, British Red Cross Society.
- William John Maxwell, Detective Sergeant, Royal Ulster Constabulary.
- Rose Meadows. For services to youth in Birmingham.
- Alan Merrick, Constable, Staffordshire Police.
- Elizabeth Mary Swale Metcalfe, Member, Women's Royal Voluntary Service.
- Paul Middup, Constable, South Yorkshire Police.
- John Frank Miles, Service Engineer, Bromley Depot, South Eastern Region, British Gas Corporation.
- Muriel Jean Mills, School Crossing Patrol, Eversley, Basingstoke.
- Thomas Mitchell, Ganger (Arterial Drainage Maintenance), Scottish Development Department.
- Michael Francis Moran, Manufacturing Manager, Colt International Ltd. For services to Export.
- Thomas John Morgan, Resident Housekeeper, National Headquarters, British Red Cross Society.
- Catherine Rose Morris, Home Help, Avon County Council.
- Geoffrey Sydney Morris, Survey Assistant (Higher Grade Cartographer), Overseas Development Administration.
- James Reginald Morris, Bricklayer, Scunthorpe Works, British Steel Corporation.
- Douglas Haig Bertie Motts, Experimental Worker II, Stores & Clothing Research & Development Establishment, Ministry of Defence.
- Patrick Welsh Murray, Foreman, Light Machine Shop, John G. Kincaid & Company Ltd, Greenock.
- Kenneth Neil, Machine Operator, Mettoy Company Ltd, Swansea.
- Ambrose Wilfrid Neill, Farm Manager 'B', Rothamsted Experimental Station, Harpenden, Hertfordshire.
- Charles Frank Neville, Warrant Officer, Portchester Detached Flight, No. 1350 (Fareham) Squadron, Air Training Corps.
- Sydney Ronald Newman, Motor Transport Driver, Ministry of Defence.
- David Barbour Nicoll, Chargehand Painter, Stoke Park Hospitals, Avon Area Health Authority.
- Jacob Nisbet, Boatswain, General Service Contracts, Christian Salvesen (Shipping) Ltd.
- Reginald William Nutt, Senior Messenger, Ministry of Defence.
- Henry Gilbert Oakley, Express Coach Driver, United Automobile Services Ltd.
- Florence Constance Old, Senior Paperkeeper, Civil Service Department.
- Adaline Patricia Osborne, Lately Waitress, Refreshment Department, House of Commons.
- John Thomas Parkin, Boatswain, Palm Line Ltd.
- Thomas Richard Parry. For services to agriculture in Anglesey.
- Ronald Frederick Pearce, Grade 2 Foreman (Distribution), Southern Electricity Board.
- John Hadden Pearson, Head Foreman, Fitting Department, Brown Brothers & Company Ltd, Edinburgh.
- Edna Jessie Peart, Maintenance Gardener, Redditch Development Corporation.
- Samuel Herbert Pepper. For services to the community in Belfast.
- Jane Lois Percival. For services to the League of Friends, Clatterbridge Hospital.
- Ada Margaret Pamela Peskett, Nursing Auxiliary, Oxted Hospital, East Surrey Health District, Surrey Area Health Authority.
- William Petrie, Supervisor/Farm Manager, Todhill Farm Training Home, Kilwinning, Ayrshire.
- Thomas Pickering, lately Pre-Issue Co-ordinator, Production Control, Warton Division, British Aerospace.
- Arthur James Pond, Pumping Superintendent (Shaftsbury), Avon & Dorset Division, Wessex Water Authority.
- Graham Pond, Sergeant, Kent Constabulary.
- George Alfred Probett, lately Milk Roundsman, United Dairies, Ewell, Surrey.
- Robert Proctor, Senior Foreman Trades Officer, HM Prison, Maze.
- Stanley William Richards, lately Process and General Supervisory Grade 'B', Royal Naval Hospital, Haslar, Ministry of Defence.
- Reginald Arthur Roberts, Technician, Methods Department, Dowty Seals, Dowty Group Ltd, Cheltenham.
- Henry Alfred Robinson, Senior Messenger, Department of Education & Science.
- John Findlay Russell, Commandant, Special Constabulary, Central Scotland Police.
- John George Eric Rymer, Transport Driver, East Midlands Electricity Board.
- Evelyn Patricia Lydall Savill, Assistant to the Area Organiser, South East Division, Area 1, Women's Royal Voluntary Service.
- Andrew Thomson Scorgie, lately Civilian Instructor III, HM Prison, Perth.
- George Arthur Roy Sewell, Outdoor Senior Clerk/Relief Timekeeper, Port of Bristol Authority.
- William Dennis Seymour, Fitter, Redcar Teesside Works, British Steel Corporation.
- James Wilson Shanks, Head Shepherd/Farm Manager, Old Manse Farm, Balmaha, near Glasgow.
- Robert John Shaw, Sub Officer, Clwyd Fire Brigade.
- William James Loos Shaw, lately Porter/Messenger, Department of Industry.
- Stanley Sidney Silver, Divisional Officer, Metropolitan Special Constabulary, Metropolitan Police.
- Frank Simmons, Highways Superintendent, Tarnworth Borough Council.
- Eric Wynford Skone, lately Caretaker, Greenhill School, Tenby.
- Fred Ladmore Slater. For services to brass band music in the Matlock area.
- John Edward Knifton Slevin, Maintenance Fitter, Plessey Telecommunications Ltd, South Shields.
- Alexander Smart Smith, Building Inspector, Scottish Special Housing Association, Angus.
- Denys Wilfred Smith, Carpenter, Department of the Environment.
- John Jackson Brook-Smith. For services to the community in Lurgan.
- Lilian May Songhurst, Cleaner, Department of Employment.
- William Henry Stewart, Chief Photoprinter, Head of Reprographic Section, Winfrith, United Kingdom Atomic Energy Authority.
- Stanley Sutton, Process and General Supervisory Grade "D", Ministry of Defence.
- Lehel Arpad Szilardy, Mechanical Superintendent, Agemaspark Ltd, High Wycombe, Buckinghamshire.
- Reginald John Stanley Tasker, Technician I, Esso Petroleum Company Ltd, Milford Haven.
- Jeremy Hildred Taylor, Detective Sergeant, Metropolitan Police.
- John Taylor, Materials Reclamation Controller, Vickers Ltd, Howson Algraphy Group.
- Norman Teasdale, Senior Caretaker, Gosforth High School, Newcastle upon Tyne.
- Margaret Joan Tennant, Local Organiser, Cottingham, North Humberside, Women's Royal Voluntary Service.
- Roger Thomas, Wayleave Officer, Pembrokeshire District, South Wales Electricity Board.
- Enid Thompson, Supervisory Cleaner, Ministry of Agriculture, Fisheries & Food.
- Joan Thompson, Chief Observer (Woman), No. 6 Group, Norwich, Royal Observer Corps.
- Mary Ann Thompson, Supervisor of Cleaning Staff, Lord Chancellor's Department.
- John Thorneloe, Service Engineer, Nottingham District, East Midlands Region, British Gas Corporation.
- John Turnbull, Constable, Cumbria Constabulary.
- Mary Adeline Turner, Driver, Government Car Service, Department of the Environment.
- John Frederick Unwin, lately chairman, Shop Stewards Committee, Marconi Avionics Ltd, Borehamwood, Herts.
- Stephen Smith Vickerstaff, Machine Shop Controller, Ferranti Instrumentation Ltd, Manchester
- Ronald Frederick Wadcock, Leading Hand Inspection, Scammell Motors.
- Matthew Ward, Constable, Royal Ulster Constabulary.
- Roy Warden, Mains and Waste Inspector, Barnsley Area, Yorkshire Water Authority.
- John Reginald Warren, Sergeant, Metropolitan Police.
- Hilda Lydia Wattis, Secretary to managing director, Midland Cattle Products Ltd.
- Edgar William Weaver, Electrical Engineer, Lucas Aerospace Ltd, Coventry.
- Florence Maud Webber, Clothing Organiser, Southend-on-Sea, Women's Royal Voluntary Service.
- Dennis George West, Head Groundsman, Bramshott and Liphook Parish Council.
- Frederick Edward Whelton, District Assistant (Coachmaker), London Transport.
- Walter Ronald Wiggs, Assistant, Production Development Unit, MY Dart Ltd. For services to Export.
- Agnes Louisa Wild, School Crossing Patrol, Metropolitan Police.
- Irene May Williams, Storekeeping Assistant, HMS Dryad, Ministry of Defence.
- Sydney Herbert Williams. For services to agriculture in Hampshire.
- Douglas Frederick Willies, Radio Technician, RAF Neatishead, Ministry of Defence.
- Charles Cecil Wilson, Head Messenger, Gerald Quin, Cope & Company Ltd.
- Beryl Eileen Winser, Foster Parent, Surrey County Council.
- Herbert Winstanley, Craftsman (Machinist), Risley Nuclear Power Development Laboratories, United Kingdom Atomic Energy Authority.
- Frederick Walter Witch, Public Duties Officer, Greater London (Prince of Wales's District), St. John Ambulance Brigade.
- Walter James Withers, lately Chief Supervisor (Night), Slough Telephone Exchange, Reading Telephone Area, British Telecommunications. The Post Office.
- Rosina Mary Womack, lately Senior Messenger, Natural Environment Research Council.
- David James Wright, Craftsman, Northern Ireland Office.
- Joseph Wylie, Ambulance Controller, Northern Ireland Ambulance Service.
- Thomas Fielding Yates, Plant Manager, Farnworth, Hawker Siddeley Dynamics Engineering Ltd.
- David Young, Colliery Overman, Kinneil Colliery, Scottish Area, National Coal Board.
- Margaret Young, Darkroom Supervisor, Publicity Department, British Broadcasting Corporation.
- Michael Robin Younger, Sergeant, Lincolnshire Police.

Overseas Territories

- Cheung Man-oy, Clerical Officer Class I, Commerce & Industry Department, Hong Kong.
- Cheung Sheung-fong, Assistant Officer I, Prisons Department, Hong Kong.
- Maribel Gumming. For services to the community in Gibraltar.
- Mayreen Fook, Personal Assistant to the Chief Justice, Hong Kong.
- Frederick Benjamin Green. For services to the community in Tristan da Cunha.
- Leroy Milton Gullap. Assistant Superintendent of Prisons, Belize.
- Lee Wing-tak, Clerical Officer Class I, Information Department, Hong Kong.
- Leung Hang, Senior Special Photographer, Police Department, Hong Kong.
- Leung Hung-ying, Chief Customs Officer, Customs & Excise Service, Hong Kong.
- Edith Rodrigues. For services to the community in St. Kitts-Nevis.
- Albert Sanchez, lately Professional and Technology Officer (IV) Housing Department, Gibraltar.
- Victor Edward Sciacaluga. Executive Preventive Officer, Customs Department, Gibraltar.
- Irene Thumb. Senior Personal Secretary, Department of Trade, Industry & Customs, Hong Kong.
- Betty Tsoi Tang. Clerical Officer Class I, Treasury Department, Hong Kong.
- Lilian Wilson. For services to the community in St. Kitts-Nevis.

Australian States

State of Victoria

- Reginald Nielsen Brain. For community service.
- Betty Ennis Coffey. For community service.
- Betty Day. For community service.
- Arleen Ekberg. For community service.
- Maureen Rae Ellis. For community service.
- Arthur Robert Frost. For service to the Royal Lifesaving Society of Australia.
- Sheila Harley. For community service.
- Janet Agnes Henderson. For service to nursing.
- Mary Kehoe. For community service.
- Grace Lock. For service to photography.
- Dinah Rosetta McGregor. For community service.
- George McKenzie. For service to junior football.
- Colin Roy McPherson. For community service.
- Ian Wallace Mathers. For municipal band service.
- Annie Helena Nuttall. For community service.
- Bruce Rowse. For public service.
- Mary Ethel Searby. For community service.
- Percival Stewart. For service to sport.
- Hilda Joy Waugh. For community service.
- Noel Frederick Wilkinson. For service to the sport of rowing.
- Muriel Lorraine Wylie. For community service.
- Minnie Lilian May Wylie. For community service.

State of Queensland

- William Arthur Carvolth. For services to the community.
- Lorraine Fisher. For services to the community.
- Frederick John Gillam. For services to the community.
- Harry Hemmling. For services to the community.
- Jessie Pollock Hockings. For services to the community.
- Grace Amy Jones. For services to the Blue Nursing Service.
- Sheila Pauline Lourigan. For services to the community.
- Thelma Isabell Loving. For services to music.
- Ernest Whiting Maltby. For services to the community.
- Jean Pidgeon. For services to the community.

State of South Australia

- Giovanni di Fede. For services to the Italian community.
- Stanley Edgar Green. For services to choral singing.
- Alexander Cockburn Hastings. For services to Association Football.
- Vicki Hoffman. For services to squash.
- Clifford Gordon Price. For services to the community.
- Maxwill John Roberts. For services to handicapped children.
- John Stephen Rowett. Secretary/Treasurer, Second 9th Australian Armoured Regimental Group Association.
- Edward Rendall Wilson. For services to the community.

State of Western Australia

- Hilda Glen Barnesby. For services to the community.
- Andrea Velino Gianotti. For services to the community.
- Robert Bryce Hayes-Thompson. For services to the community.
- Agnes Lochhead Johnston. For services to Navy welfare.
- Harold Raymond Klopper. For services to Agricultural Societies.
- Elsie Roberta Mead. For services to the blind.
- Paddy Morlumbun. For services to the Aboriginal community.
- Ian Stanley Pedler. For services to the Aboriginal community.
- Robert Thomson. For services to horticulture.

==== Bar to the British Empire Medal ====
Military Division

- 395094 Staff Sergeant (Acting Warrant Officer Class 2) Margaret Rosie, BEM, Women's Royal Army Corps (now discharged).

=== Royal Red Crosses (RRC) ===
Army

- Lieutenant Colonel Mary Brigid Teresa Hennessy, MBE (461076), Queen Alexandra's Royal Army Nursing Corps.
- Lieutenant Colonel Rosemary Martin (448415), Queen Alexandra's Royal Army Nursing Corps.

Royal Air Force

- Group Captain April Anne Reed, ARRC, Princess Mary's Royal Air Force Nursing Service.
- Wing Commander Mary Michal Shaw (408035), Princess Mary's Royal Air Force Nursing Service.

==== Associates of the Royal Red Cross (ARRC) ====
Royal Navy

- Superintending Sister Marion Hamill, Queen Alexandra's Royal Naval Nursing Service.
- Superintending Sister Linda Joan Hammond, Queen Alexandra's Royal Naval Nursing Service.
- Matron Ethel Vera Wade, Queen Alexandra's Royal Naval Nursing Service.

Army

- Major Doris Evelyn Brooker (452570), Queen Alexandra's Royal Army Nursing Corps.
- Major Jean Redhead (471016), Queen Alexandra's Royal Army Nursing Corps.

Royal Air Force

- Squadron Leader Kathleen Judith Hopkins (408232), Princess Mary's Royal Air Force Nursing Service.
- W4060392 Flight Sergeant William Davison Bell.

=== Air Force Crosses (AFC) ===
Royal Air Force

- Wing Commander Peter John Goddard (4231689).
- Wing Commander John Edward Houghton (4230464).
- Wing Commander David Charles Scouller (607664).
- Squadron Leader Barry Dove (4231131).
- Squadron Leader Jeremy Francis Fisher (608317) (Retd.)
- Squadron Leader Roderick Harvey Goodall (608783).
- Squadron Leader Grant McLeod (688473).
- Flight Lieutenant John Philip Connor (2602197).
- Flight Lieutenant Gordon Douglas Lambert (4127639).
- Flight Lieutenant Philip Arthur Tolman (8025526).

==== Bars to the Air Force Cross ====
Royal Air Force

- Wing Commander Douglas Stuart Balfour Marr, AFC (2617935).
- Wing Commander Trevor Nattrass, AFC (4230802).

=== Air Force Medal (AFM) ===
Royal Air Force

- J1945139 Flight Sergeant Raymond John Willis.

=== Queen's Police Medals (QPM) ===
England and Wales

- George Musgrove Taylor Barton, Chief Superintendent, Avon & Somerset Constabulary.
- Raymond Harold Barton, Assistant Chief Constable, Sussex Police.
- Victor Alan Butler, Chief Superintendent, South Wales Constabulary.
- George Charlton, Chief Constable, Norfolk Constabulary.
- Robert William Cozens, Chief Constable, West Mercia Constabulary.
- Brian Keith Fairbairn, Commander, Metropolitan Police.
- Michael Walter Gibson, Assistant Chief Constable, Kent Constabulary.
- Herbert Hoy, lately Chief Superintendent, Greater Manchester Police.
- Anthony Wallace Lampard, Commander, Metropolitan Police.
- Geoffrey Daniel McLean, Deputy Assistant Commissioner, Metropolitan Police.
- Cyril Joseph Matthews, Chief Superintendent, West Midlands Police.
- David Owen, Chief Constable, Dorset Police.
- Thomas Henry Phillips, Chief Superintendent, Merseyside Police.
- John Radley, Deputy Assistant Commissioner, Metropolitan Police.
- Robert Cedric Wilkes, Chief Superintendent, Staffordshire Police.

Northern Ireland

- Livingstone Britton Kirkwood, Chief Inspector, Royal Ulster Constabulary.

Scotland

- Robert Shearer Sim, MBE, Chief Constable, Tayside Police.
- Arthur Magee Bell, Assistant Chief Constable, Strathclyde Police.
- Thomas McFarlane Carruthers, Assistant Chief Constable, Strathclyde Police.

Overseas Territories

- Donald Hugh McMillan, Inspector, Falkland Islands Police Force.

Australian State.

State of Queensland

- Eric Royal Cherry, Superintendent, Queensland Police Force.

State of South Australia

- Roland Frank Heath, Chief Superintendent, South Australia Police Force.

State of Western Australia

- George Edward Brown, Superintendent, Western Australian Police Force.
- Michael Cronan Mulvey, Inspector, Western Australian Police Force.

State of Victoria

- Edgar Noel Standfield, Chief Superintendent, Victoria Police Force.
- Peter Maxwell Standfield, Commander, Victoria Police Force.

=== Queen's Fire Services Medals (QFSM) ===
England and Wales

- Jeffrey Harry Brereton, lately Assistant Chief Officer, Staffordshire Fire Brigade.
- John William Browning, Assistant Chief Officer, Somerset Fire Brigade.
- Malcolm James Mace, Chief Fire Officer, South Glamorgan Fire Brigade.
- Valentine Condliff Quine, Assistant Chief Officer, Merseyside Fire Brigade.

Scotland

- William Shand, Firemaster, Northern Fire Brigade.

Australian States

State of Victoria

- Lawrence Gordon Lavelle, Deputy Chief Fire Officer, Victoria Country Fire Authority.
- Brian Vincent Potter, Deputy Chief Officer, Victoria Country Fire Authority.
- Thomas Francis Henry Williamson, Assistant Chief Fire Officer, Victoria Country Fire Authority.

State of South Australia

- Richard Charles Rowe, BEM, Senior Superintendent, South Australia Fire Brigade.

=== Colonial Police Medals (CPM) ===
- Wah-cheong Chan, Station Sergeant of Police, Royal Hong Kong Police Force.
- Stephen Peter Corrick, Chief Inspector of Police, Royal Hong Kong Police Force.
- David Deptford, Superintendent of Police, Royal Hong Kong Police Force.
- Yee-cheuk Fong, Inspector of Police, Royal Hong Kong Police Force.
- Kenneth Gerald Harvey, Superintendent of Police, Bermuda Police Force.
- Kar-chu Ho, Chief Inspector of Police, Royal Hong Kong Police Force.
- Chiu-suen Hung, Chief Inspector of Police, Royal Hong Kong Police Force.
- Robert John Kerley, Superintendent of Police, Royal Hong Kong Police Force.
- Chiu-wah Ku, Chief Inspector of Police, Royal Hong Kong Police Force.
- Man-li Lau, Principal Fireman, Hong Kong Fire Services.
- Chiu-wing Lee, Station Sergeant of Police, Royal Hong Kong Police Force.
- Peter Lam-chuen Lee, Senior Superintendent of Police, Royal Hong Kong Police Force.
- Russell Allan James Lister, Chief Inspector of Police, Bermuda Police Force.
- Frederic Samuel McCosh, Senior Superintendent of Police, Royal Hong Kong Police Force.
- Albert McMaster, Sergeant of Police, Royal British Virgin Islands Police Force.
- Kai Ng, Principal Fireman, Hong Kong Fire Services.
- Yuen-Kei Ng, Chief Inspector of Police, Royal Hong Kong Police Force.
- Cecil Alfred John Sheppard, Chief Superintendent of Police, Royal Hong Kong Police Force.
- Lai-yin So, Chief Superintendent of Police, Royal Hong Kong Police Force.
- Donald Mcfarlane Watson, Senior Superintendent of Police, Royal Hong Kong Police Force.

=== Queen's Commendations for Valuable Service in the Air ===
Royal Air Force

- Squadron Leader John David Blake (4230045).
- Squadron Leader Philip Jeremy Brown (2617685).
- Squadron Leader Ronald David Elder (608799).
- Squadron Leader William Laurence Green (2616156).
- Flight Lieutenant Alastair Ian Bartlett Beedie (4233544).
- Flight Lieutenant Peter Andrew Branthwaite (4232990).
- Flight Lieutenant Terence Edwin Duggan (689138).
- Flight Lieutenant George Anthony Ellis (2615308) (Retd.)
- Flight Lieutenant Richard Michael Hughes Ellis (8025399).
- Flight Lieutenant John Anthony Foster (4231049).
- Flight Lieutenant Michael Brodie Graham (1946763).
- Flight Lieutenant Richard Harry Harden (593938) (Retd.)
- Flight Lieutenant James Brian Hobbs (8025779).
- Flight Lieutenant Jerzy Kazimierz Stanislaw Kmiecik, AFM (704441) (Retd.)
- Flight Lieutenant Neil Gordon Matheson (8020967).
- Flight Lieutenant Peter Charles Tait (4231249) (Retd.)
- Flight Lieutenant Ian Gerald Wellings (4232205).

United Kingdom

- Peter Bramley, Chief Pilot Training, British Airways Helicopters Ltd.
- Kenneth Eugene Foster, Director of Operations, Loganair.
- Reginald Trevor Stock, lately Jet Provost/Strikemaster Project Pilot, Warton Division, British Aerospace.

== Australia ==
=== Knights Bachelor ===
- Donald Payze Eckersley, OBE. For service to primary industry.
- Peter Hamilton Finley, OBE, DFC. For service to commerce.
- Leslie Trevor Froggatt. For service to commerce and industry
- James Gilbert Hardy, OBE. For service to the sport of yachting.
- Peter James Lawler, OBE. For public service.
- Sidney Robert Nolan, CBE. For service to art.
- Kenneth Charles Steele, DFC. For service to commerce.

=== Order of the Bath ===
==== Companions of the Order of the Bath (CB) ====
Civil Division

- Robert William Furlonger. For public service.

=== Order of Saint Michael and Saint George ===
==== Companions of the Order of St Michael and St George (CMG) ====
- John Henry Antill, OBE. For service to music.
- The Most Reverend Dr. Felix Raymond Arnott, formerly Archbishop of Brisbane.
- Dr. Charles Henry Gurd, CBE. For public service in the field of health.
- Dr. Eileen Alannah Joyce. For service to music.
- Emeritus Professor Eric Galton Saint. For service to medicine and the community.

=== Order of the British Empire ===
==== Dame Commander of the Order of the British Empire (DBE) ====
Civil Division

- Catherine Margaret Mary Scott, OBE. For service to ballet.

==== Knights Commander of the Order of the British Empire (KBE) ====
Military Division
Royal Australian Navy

- Vice Admiral Guido James Willis, AO, Chief of Naval Staff.

Civil Division

- Emeritus Professor Rupert Horace Myers, CBE. For service to education, science and the community.

==== Commanders of the Order of the British Empire (CBE) ====
Military Division
Royal Australian Navy

- Commodore Robert Henry Percy, 0916.

Australian Army

- Brigadier Francis Sylvester Hallissy, ED, 373107, Army Reserve.

Civil Division

- Claude Noel Austin. For service to conservation.
- Margaret Lurline Davey, MBE. For service to women's affairs.
- The Right Reverend Dr. Robert Edward Davies. For service to religion.
- Keith Reginald Hamilton. For public service.
- The Most Reverend John Jobst. For service to religion.
- Ian James Stodart Kennison. For public service.
- Dr. Donald Fred McMichael. For public service.
- Howarth Edkins Peterson. For service to commerce, law and the community.

==== Officers of the Order of the British Empire (OBE) ====
Civil Division

- Charles Ivens Buffett, MBE. For public service.
- Dr. Keith Gordon Cockburn. For service to medicine.
- Gordon Frederick Craig. For public service.
- Richard Sydney Divall. For service to music.
- Margaret Anne Feilman. For service to architecture and conservation.
- John Bowen Ross Gale. For community service.
- Robert Joseph Gard. For service to opera.
- Harry Goldman. For service to the Jewish community.
- Robert Napier Hamilton. For public service.
- John Fairbanks Kerr. For public service.
- William George Kiddle. For public service.
- Dr. Margaret Anne Kinlough. For service to health and veterans.
- Elvio Luigi Meoli. For service to the Italian community.
- Bruce Carlyle Ruxton, MBE. For service to veterans.
- Thomas Maxwell Saint. For service to the wheat industry.
- Colin Simpson. For service to literature and journalism.
- Emeritus Professor Richard Selby Smith. For service to education.
- Murray Herman Stevenson. For service to engineering, particularly in the fields of radio, film and television.
- Lyell George Arthur Stuart. For service to pastoral industry.
- Donald Malcolm Talbot. For service to sport.
- Graham Grant White. For public service.
- Dr. George Frederick Wood. For service to science/wool industry.
- Michael Gejza Zifcak. For service to literature.

==== Members of the Order of the British Empire (MBE) ====
Military Division
Royal Australian Navy

- Lieutenant Commander Norman John Boyd Fegan, 01394.
- Lieutenant Commander James Winston Firth, 021955.

Australian Army

- Major Leon Joseph Cooper, 35713, Royal Australian Artillery.
- Major Rainer Hans Frisch, 335172, Royal Australian Engineers.
- Major George Anthony Nolan, 14419, Royal Australian Infantry.
- Major Rodney Paul O'Leary, 216495, Royal Australian Infantry.
- Major Paul Stacy O'Sullivan, 19966, Royal Australian Infantry.
- Major Geoffrey William George Steventon, 2190085, Army Reserve.

Royal Australian Air Force

- Squadron Leader Douglas Phillip Hurst, 0315063.
- Flight Lieutenant Lynton Peter Mathews, 0319187.
- Squadron Leader Duane Maxwell Rose, 018816.
- Flight Lieutenant Richard James Sargeant, 0124907.

Civil Division

- Denver William Banyard. For public service.
- Alan Frank Blackburn. For public service.
- John Ernest Brotherson. For public service.
- Constance Doreen Bush. For service to Aboriginal women.
- Lieutenant Commander Allen Baden Cleaver. For service to youth.
- Thomas Joseph Corcoran. For public service.
- Reginald Bevan Crampton. For service to aviation.
- Michael Steven Diamond. For service to the Greek community.
- Reverend Hector Lockhart Dunn. For service to religion and the community.
- Sister Mary Eucharia (Olive Pearce). For service to the Aboriginal community.
- Margaret Ethel Gardner. For service to education and to the handicapped.
- Peter Raymond Garrett. For service to shooting.
- Sylvia Gelman. For service to education, youth and the Jewish community.
- Shane Elizabeth Gould (Mrs. S. E. Innes). For service to swimming.
- Daniel Graham. For public service.
- Franciszek Hadzel. For service to veterans and to the Polish community.
- Gordon Douglas Hawkes, JP. For service to the community.
- Mervyn John Howard. For services to local government.
- Walter Morris Hunt. For service to the community.
- Alfred Henry Hutton. For service to local government and the community.
- Reverend Cedric Jacobs. For service to the Aboriginal community.
- Reverend Percy Eric Leske. For service to religion and the Aboriginal community.
- Dennis Keith Lillee. For service to cricket.
- Clements William McIntyre. For service to the beekeeping industry.
- Mervyn Edwards McLennan. For service to the community and to primary industry.
- Brian Frank Martin. For service to the community.
- John Cossar Merrington. For service to local government.
- Hilton Charles Middleton. For service to rugby league.
- Philip Bennett Moore, DFC. For public service.
- Arthur Ingham Myers, JP. For service to veterans and the community.
- Bobbie Sydenham Nicholls, DFC. For public service.
- Kathleen Alice Peisley. For service to education and the community.
- John Arthur Pickworth. For service to primary industry.
- David Sydney Pooke. For service to the arts in the field of music.
- The Venerable John Victor James Robinson, ED. For service to religion.
- Anthony Dalton Roche. For service to tennis.
- Douglas Hamley Mudie Roeger. For service to local government.
- Eric Cyril Russell. For service to the handicapped in the field of sport.
- Harold James Shearman. For service to local government and the community.
- Franz Ferdinand Leopold Stampfl. For service to athletics.
- Dulcie May Stone. For service to the handicapped.
- Robert Myles John Stutsell. For service to sport and veterans.
- Andrew Warburton Swan. For service to the handicapped in the field of sport.
- John Keith Taylor. For public service.
- Theo Lucas Worland. For public service.
- Elinor Caroline Wray. For services to health, particularly in the field of speech therapy.

=== Companions of the Imperial Service Order (ISO) ===
- Francis John Chatillon. For public service.
- Glen Lyndon Koch. For public service.

=== British Empire Medals (BEM) ===
Military Division
Royal Australian Navy

- Warrant Officer Rodney Keith Beckinsale, R62724.
- Chief Petty Officer Cecil Edward Jones, R59503.

Australian Army

- Sergeant Leslie John Burrows, 12178, Royal Australian Electrical and Mechanical Engineers.
- Sergeant Garry William Fraser, 1201011, Royal Australian Corps of Signals.
- Sergeant Bruce Douglas Gibson, 44639, Royal Australian Electrical and Mechanical Engineers.
- Sergeant Alex Michael Kutcha, 4723454, Royal Australian Army Ordnance Corps.
- Sergeant Brian Charles Parrish, 313908, Royal Australian Engineers.
- Sergeant Alexander Gordon Tinker, 3111351, Army Reserve.

Royal Australian Air Force

- Sergeant Gerard Bernard Fitzgibbon, A225284.
- Sergeant Donald John Gordon, A220940.
- Flight Sergeant Douglas Edward Pankhurst, A317075.
- Flight Sergeant John Thomas Wattus, A19598.

Civil Division

- Ellen Mary Rosa Ah Mat. For community service.
- Vera Jane Batten. For community service.
- Ronald George Beard. For public service.
- Mavis Margaret Euphemia Blight. For community service.
- Ida Lillian Isabel Bruchhauser. For service to art and the community.
- Harold Alfred Bryant. For service to sailing.
- Ronald Button. For public service.
- Ewen Cameron. For service to bowls.
- Nora Close. For service to the community and migrant welfare.
- Protective Service Sergeant Ernest John Coe. For service to the Australian Federal Police.
- Gordon Cook, JP. For service to the community.
- Sister Mary Genevieve (Cummins). For service to the community.
- Dennis James Dartnall. For service to the community.
- William Davidson. For public and community service.
- Hanna Enders. For service to the community.
- Hilda Elizabeth Foster. For service to the Presbyterian Church.
- Geoffrey Roy Glanville. For public service.
- Winifred Florence Glasgow. For service to the disabled.
- Herbert Harry Handicott. For public service.
- Valeria Hansen (Mrs. V. Thomas). For service to ballet and the community.
- Georgie Jani. For service to nursing.
- William Ernest Kemp. For public service.
- James Brown Kerr. For public service.
- Berice Mabel Luther. For public service.
- Flora Macrae. For public service.
- Petar Milosevic. For public service.
- Jan Oruba. For public service.
- Robert George Skinner. For public service.
- Allan Henry Smith. For public service.
- Florence May Smith. For community service.
- Noel Montague Tottenham. For public service.
- Elizabeth Emily Barnes Viazim. For service to the performing arts.
- Ernest John Watson. For services to the blind.
- James Whyte. For community service.
- Stella Agnes Wilkinson. For public service.
- Olive Esther Muriel Willis, for community service.
- Allan Frederick Wise. For community service.
- Ida Joyce Wise. For community service.
- Elsie Christine Young. For community service.

=== Royal Red Crosses (RRC) ===
Australian Army

- Colonel Helen Francis Adamson, ARRC, F3637, Royal Australian Army Nursing Corps.

Australian Air Force

- Group Captain Ailsa Betty Edwards, ARRC, N13585, Royal Australian Air Force Nursing Service.

==== Associate of the Royal Red Cross (ARRC) ====
Royal Australian Air Force

- Wing Commander Judith Robson, N223345, Royal Australian Air Force Nursing Service.

=== Air Force Crosses (AFC) ===
Royal Australian Navy

- Lieutenant Commander Colin William Talbot, 02322.

Australian Army

- Captain John Charles Marsden, 218587, Australian Army Aviation Corps.

Royal Australian Air Force

- Squadron Leader David Kenneth Holbourn, 044831.

=== Queen's Commendations for Valuable Service in the Air ===
Royal Australian Air Force

- Flight Lieutenant Phillip Darcy Byrne, 0121235.
- Flight Lieutenant Paul Geoffrey Hickerton, 0117908.
- Squadron Leader Peter Jabornicky, 0315908.
- Flight Lieutenant David John Llewelyn, 049003.

== Mauritius ==
=== Order of the British Empire ===
==== Commander of the Order of the British Empire (CBE) ====
Civil Division

- Lutchmyparsad Mohabeer Mungur. For services in the field of agricultural and industrial development.

==== Officer of the Order of the British Empire (OBE) ====
Civil Division

- Capil Moonee Modun. For voluntary social work.

==== Members of the Order of the British Empire (MBE) ====
Civil Division

- Ralph Yves Cundasamy. For service in the Scout Movement.
- Mohammad Dawood Sulleman Dewangree. For voluntary social work.
- Baya Jankoo. For voluntary social work.
- Lacho Seewoosungkur. For voluntary social work.

=== Companion of the Imperial Service Order (ISO) ===
- James Emmanuel Arthur Cupidon. Registrar-General.

=== British Empire Medals (BEM) ===
Civil Division

- Aurel Roland Emmanuel, lately Superintendent of Prisons.
- Sookdeho Ram Lal, lately diver, Mauritius Marine Authority.

=== Queen's Police Medal (QPM) ===
- Marcel Tadebois, MPM, Deputy Commissioner, Mauritius Police Force.

=== Mauritius Police Medals (MPM) ===
- Goorooduth Buramdoyal, Assistant Superintendent, Mauritius Police Force.
- Lutchmeenarain Dwarka, Inspector, Mauritius Police Force.
- Claude Seide Nicolas, Superintendent, Mauritius Police Force.
- Sooreshchandra Ramlackhan, Chief Inspector, Mauritius Police Force.

== Fiji ==
=== Order of the British Empire ===
==== Commanders of the Order of the British Empire (CBE) ====
Civil Division

- Isoa Ratunamoli Bakani. For services to health and medicine.
- Major Jesoni Balewai Takala, OBE, Permanent Secretary for Fijian Affairs and Rural Development.

==== Officers of the Order of the British Empire (OBE) ====
Military Division

- Lieutenant Colonel Sitiveni Ligamamada Rabuka, 1st Battalion, Fiji Infantry Regiment.

Civil Division

- Dijendra Singh. For services to the community.
- Apakuki Basiga Tuitavua. For public service to the meat industry.
- Micky Yee. For services to commercial pig production and to the community.

==== Members of the Order of the British Empire (MBE) ====
Military Division

- Warrant Officer Class 1, Jese Marriot Mucuna-Bitu, Royal Fiji Military Forces.
- Warrant Officer Class 2, Filimone Naicavu, Royal Fiji Military Forces.
- Warrant Officer Class 1, Manoa Tuveidre Toka Lautawa, Royal Fiji Military Forces.

Civil Division

- Ratu Naiqama Tawakedrau Lalabalavu. For public and community service.
- Shew Prasad. Chairman of the Canefarmers Co-operative Savings and Loans Association Ltd.
- Watisoni Kaloukana Seruvatu. For services to, education, Scouting and the community.
- Jerry Tikaram. For services to Scouting and the community.
- Walter Whippy. For services to shipbuilding.

=== Queen's Police Medal (QPM) ===
- Mosese Tuisawau, Deputy Commissioner, Royal Fiji Police.

== The Bahamas ==
=== Order of the British Empire ===
==== Members of the Order of the British Empire (MBE) ====
Civil Division

- Marie Eleanor Murray. For services to the community and church, particularly in the area of rehabilitation of female prisoners.
- Persis Hilda Rodgers. For services to the community, particularly among the aged.

=== British Empire Medal (BEM) ===
Civil Division

- Charles William Diggis, Assistant Building Control Officer.

== Papua New Guinea ==
=== Knight Bachelor ===
- Pita Simogun, MBE, BEM. For public and community services.

=== Order of Saint Michael and Saint George ===
==== Companion of the Order of St Michael and St George (CMG) ====
- Vincent Serei Eri, Secretary for Defence.

=== Order of the British Empire ===
==== Knights Commander of the Order of the British Empire (KBE) ====
Civil Division

- Reverend Percy Chatterton, CMG, OBE. For services to the people of Papua New Guinea.
- Henry Thomas ToRobert. Governor of the Bank of Papua New Guinea.

==== Commanders of the Order of the British Empire (CBE) ====
Civil Division

- Dr. Alexis Holyweek Sarei. For services to Provincial Government.
- The Honourable Mr. Justice John Greville Smith. Judge of the National Court.

==== Officers of the Order of the British Empire (OBE) ====
Military Division

- Colonel Anthony Robert Huai, (83350), Chief of Operations, Papua New Guinea Defence Force.

Civil Division

- Anthony Francis Elly. Clerk of the National Parliament.
- Lionel Rhys Healey. For public service.
- Henry Joseph Hans Klink. Chairman, Papua New Guinea Banking Corporation.
- James Saleng Mileng. Electoral Commissioner.

==== Members of the Order of the British Empire (MBE) ====
Military Division

- Warrant Officer Oliver Absalom (83728), Papua New Guinea Defence Force.
- Warrant Officer Williams Gilly (82112), Papua New Guinea Defence Force.

Civil Division

- Jakupa Ako. For services to art.
- Michael Dawadawareta. For public service.
- James Clark Dunstan. For services to civil aviation.
- Manki Kaoti. For services to the community.
- Harry Beresford Clifford Love. For services to the community.
- John Bevan O'Donohue. For services to agriculture.
- Aisoli Salin. For services to the community.
- Samuel Tam. For services to the community.
- Morea Ovia Toua. For services to broadcasting and journalism.
- Mary Agnes Waninara. For services to health and to the community.
- Amu Yape. For services to local government.

=== British Empire Medals (BEM) ===
Military Division

- Sergeant Andrew Panap (82618), Papua New Guinea Defence Force.

Civil Division

- Sergeant Minia Geno (477), Band Sergeant, Royal Papua New Guinea Constabulary.
- Garu Jam. For services to local government.
- Gibson Saura, Senior Assistant Correctional Officer, Corrective Institutions Service.
- Clement Haroharo Seaea. For services to local government.

=== Queen's Police Medals (QPM) ===
- Terence William Selva, Assistant Commissioner, Royal Papua New Guinea Constabulary.
- Dorkou Tasion, Assistant Commissioner, Royal Papua New Guinea Constabulary.

== Solomon Islands ==
=== Order of the British Empire ===
==== Members of the Order of the British Empire (MBE) ====
Civil Division

- Jonathan Fifi'i. For political services.
- Lionel James Simister, Comptroller of Posts and Telecommunications.
- John Vatehau, Principal Health Inspector.

=== British Empire Medals (BEM) ===
Civil Division

- Dionisio Tanutanu, Clerk to Shortlands Local Court.
- Beato Torasukagiara. For public and community service.

== Tuvalu ==
=== Order of the British Empire ===
==== Member of the Order of the British Empire (MBE) ====
Civil Division

- Tihala Malaki. For services to the dental profession.

== Saint Lucia ==
=== Order of the British Empire ===
==== Commander of the Order of the British Empire (CBE) ====
Civil Division

- Joseph Marie Louis Floissac. For services to the community.

==== Officer of the Order of the British Empire (OBE) ====
Civil Division

- Victor Edward Girard, Secretary to the Cabinet of Saint Lucia.

==== Member of the Order of the British Empire (MBE) ====
Civil Division

- Charles Eugene. For services to teaching and the community.

=== British Empire Medals (BEM) ===
Civil Division

- Martin Barthelmy. For services to the fishing industry and the community.
- Humilta Laporte. For services as a librarian.
- Albert O'Shaughnessy, deputy director of the National Insurance Scheme.
- Mary Albertha Prescod, formerly Librarian of the Central Library.

=== Queen's Police Medal (QPM) ===
- Cuthbert Darnley Phillips, CPM, Deputy Commissioner of Police, Royal Saint Lucia Police Force.
