= David Armytage =

Captain David Armytage CBE
- Born: 4 September 1929
- Died: 2 February 2015 (aged 85)
- Spouse: Contessa Cosima de Bosdari
- Military career
- Allegiance: United Kingdom
- Branch: Royal Navy
- Service years: 1943–1980

Captain David George Armytage CBE (4 September 1929 – 2 February 2015) was a Royal Navy officer who was a specialist in the use of radar and commanded several frigates. He took part in the "Cod Wars".

Armytage was appointed a Commander of the Order of the British Empire (CBE) in the 1981 Birthday Honours.
