= Arthur Norman Exton-Smith =

British gerontologist (1920–1990)

- Born: 1920
- Died: 1990 (aged 69–70)
- Known for: gerontology
- Scientific career
- Fields: medicine
- Workplaces: St Pancras Hospital

Arthur Norman Exton-Smith CBE (1920–1990) was a British physician. He was known for his studies on thermoregulation and postural balance of elderly people.

He was appointed a Commander of the Order of the British Empire (CBE) in the 1981 Birthday Honours, when he was Barlow Professor of Geriatric Medicine at University College Hospital Medical School, University of London.
