= Hereford Cattle Society =

British breeding authority on Hereford cattle

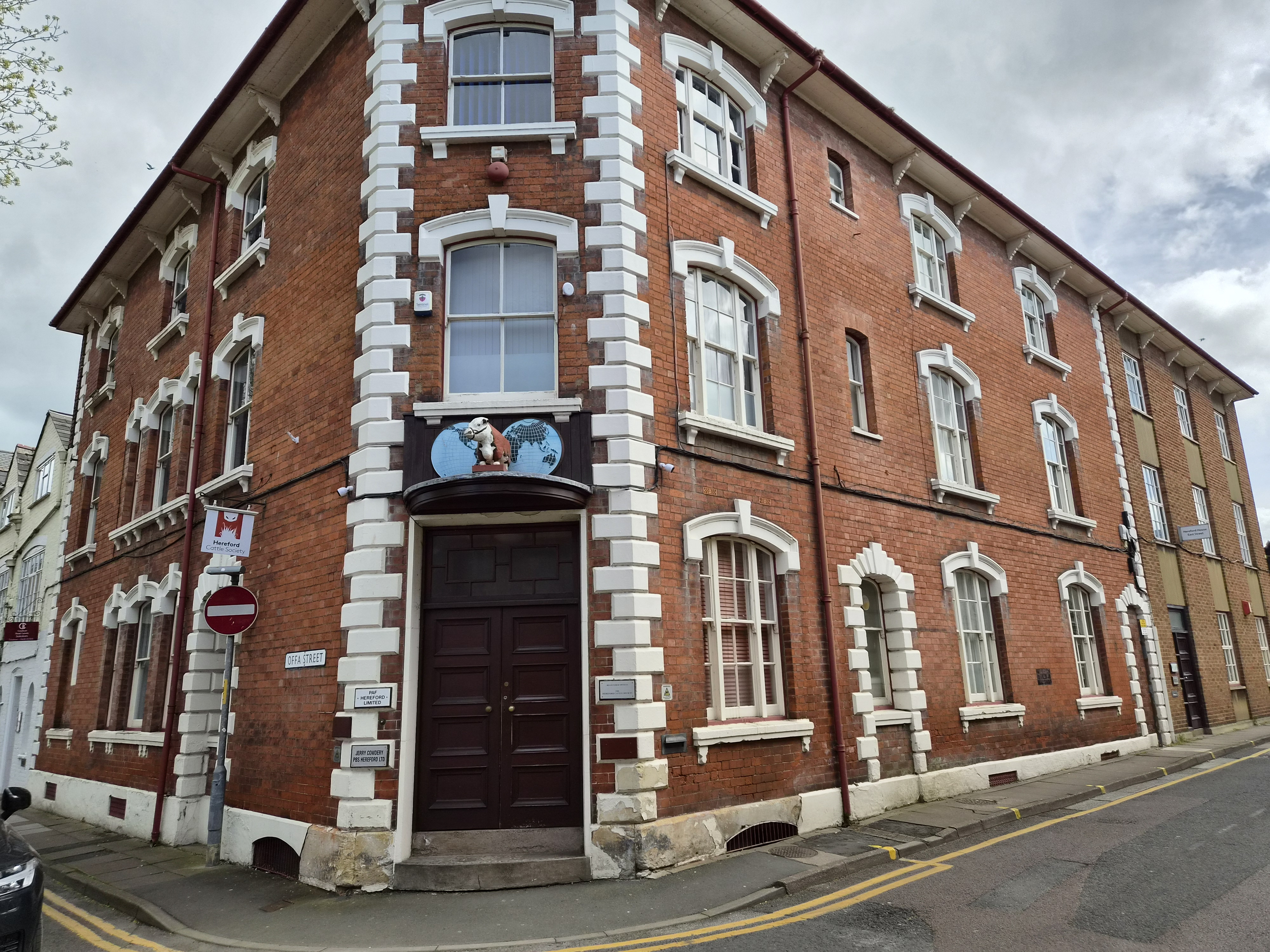
Hereford Cattle Society, Offa Street, Hereford

The Hereford Cattle Society (formerly the Hereford Herd Book Society, also known as the Hereford Breed Society) is the British breeding authority on Hereford Cattle, and the originator of the breed's herd book. Founded in 1878 as the Hereford Herd Book Society (under the patronage of Queen Victoria), the Herd Book for the breed was open between 1846 and 1886, since which point it has remained closed; the consequence of this is that all Hereford cattle in existence today can (and must) directly trace their lineage to a sire and dam recorded in the society's book. The current name has been used since 1996. Based in Offa Street in Hereford, the Society also originally housed the World Hereford Council, when it began as an offshoot organisation in 1951. The Society today continues to hold cattle sales, shows and events promoting and cultivating the consumption, trade and development of Hereford cattle throughout the United Kingdom.
