= Vokes =

Vokes is a surname. Notable people with the surname include:

- Christopher Vokes (1904–1985), Canadian Army officer
- Ed Vokes (1908–1967), Canadian ice hockey player
- Emily H. Vokes (born 1930), American malacologist and paleontologist
- Harold Vokes (1908–1998), American malacologist and paleontologist
- Leroy H. Vokes (1849–1924), American soldier
- May Vokes (1882–1957), American actress
- Richard Vokes, anthropologist
- Sam Vokes (born 1989), Welsh footballer
- Vokes family of actors:
  - Fawdon Vokes (born Walter Fawdon; 1844–1904), actor
  - Fred Vokes (1846–1888), actor and dancer
  - Jessie Vokes (1848–1884), actress and dancer
  - Rosina Vokes (1854–1894), actress

== See also ==
- Voke (disambiguation)
