= Fred Vokes =

British dancer and actor (1846–1888)

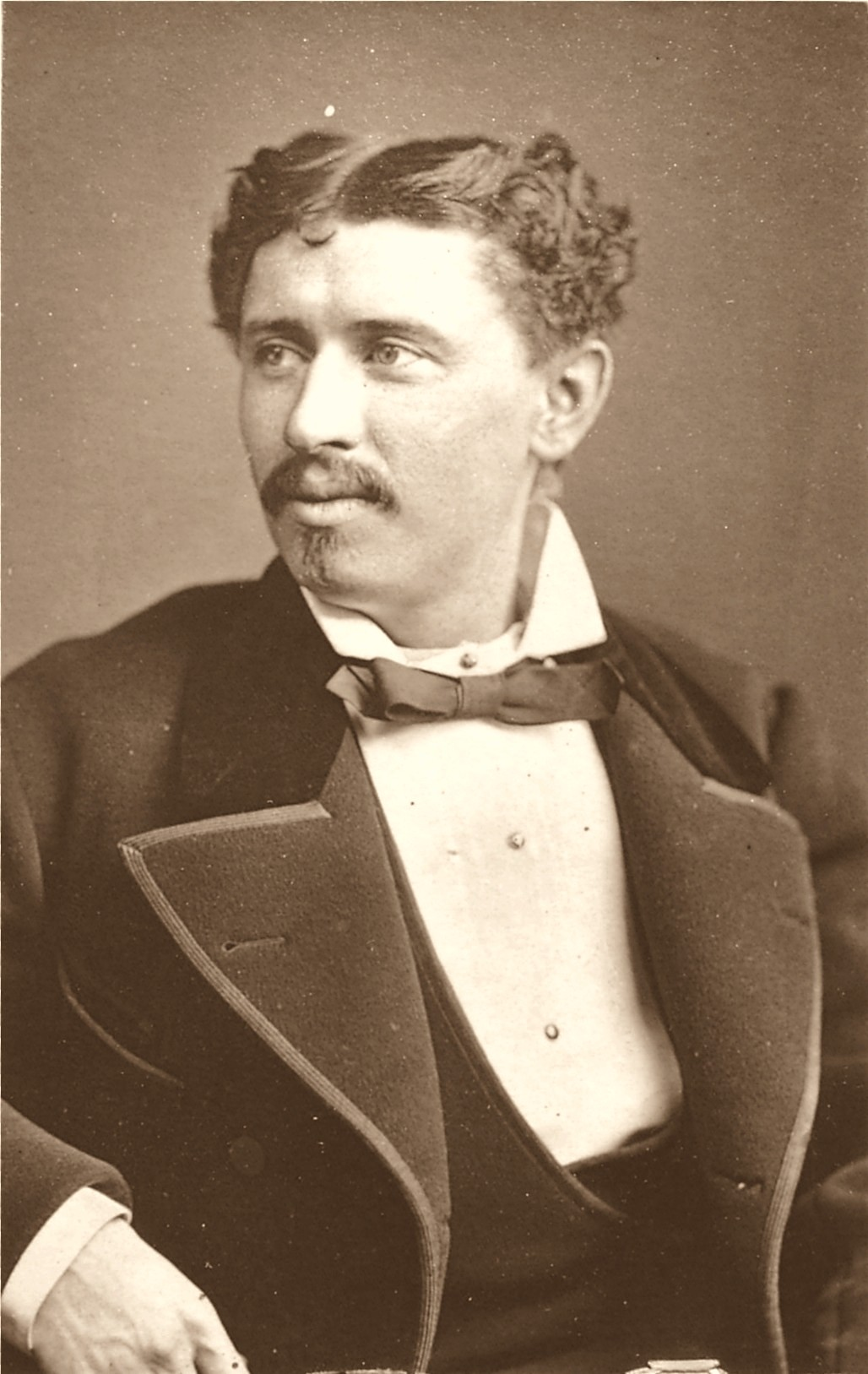
Fred Vokes in 1875

Frederick Mortimer Vokes (22 January 1846 – 3 June 1888) was a British music hall, pantomime and burlesque dancer and actor of the 19th-century and a member of the Vokes Family troupe of entertainers. For more than ten years they were the central attraction at the annual pantomime at the Theatre Royal, Drury Lane from 1868 to 1879 when their popularity began to wane. Because of his eccentric style of dancing he was billed as the "Legmania" dancer.

== Early life and career ==
Frederick Mortimer Vokes was born in Clerkenwell in London in 1846 and was a member of the well-known Vokes family made up of three sisters, a brother and "foster brother" (actually actor Walter Fawdon (1844–1904) who changed his name to Fawdon Vokes and who outlived the rest of his "family") popular in the pantomime theatres of 1870s London and in the United States. Their father, Frederick Strafford Thwaites Vokes (1816–1890), was a theatrical costumier and wigmaker who owned a shop at 19 Henrietta Street, Covent Garden. Their mother Sarah Jane Biddulph née Godden (1818–1897) was the daughter of Welsh-born strolling player Will Wood and his actress wife.

The eldest of the siblings, he was educated for the stage from an early age, being tutored in acting by Mr. Chadwick and in dancing, in which he excelled, by Mr. Flexmore. He made his first appearance at the Surrey Theatre in 1854 aged 8 as the boy in the farce Seeing Wright. The 1861 Census lists the 15 year-old Fred's occupation as "Actor".

== The Vokes Family ==
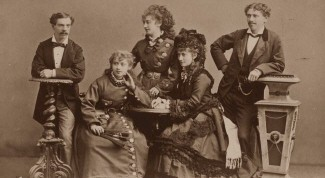
The Vokes Family in about 1875: (l-r) Fawdon Vokes, Rosina, Victoria, Jessie and Fred Vokes

With his sisters, Rosina, Victoria and Jessie, and "foster brother" Fawdon, first as the "Vokes Children" and later the "Vokes Family" they began to perform at music halls and at pantomimes, and by their agility and humour made the name well known to English and American theatre-goers. They made their début on Christmas night in 1861 at Howard's Operetta House in Edinburgh and made their London début at the Alhambra Theatre in 1862 when they were billed as 'The Five Little Vokes'. They appeared at the Lyceum Theatre in London on 26 December 1868 in Edward Litt Laman Blanchard's pantomime Humpty Dumpty in which the critic of The Daily Telegraph wrote that Fred Vokes '...dances as few men in this world probably could dance or would wish to dance. The extraordinary contortions of limb in which his dancing abounds – contortions which in Mr Vokes’ hands – or rather legs – are not lacking in grace – are highly suggestive of the impossibility of his suffering at any time from such accidents as dislocations.' With his siblings he traveled through a great part of the civilized world. Early in their career, at the Lyceum Theatre in London, they danced in W. S. Gilbert's pantomime Harlequin Cock Robin and Jenny Wren.

They first appeared in the popular The Belles of the Kitchen on 27 February 1869 at the Standard Theatre in London. Their success was pronounced and continuous. They made their Paris debut in August 1870 at the Théâtre du Châtelet where they were an immediate success, but with the outbreak of the Franco-Prussian War it became unsafe to remain and they left the city with just a few hours notice. Back in London he appeared with the rest of the Vokes Family in Tom Thumb the Great; or, Harlequin King Arthur and the Knights of the Round Table in their début performance at the Theatre Royal, Drury Lane in Christmas 1871.

== Theatrical career ==
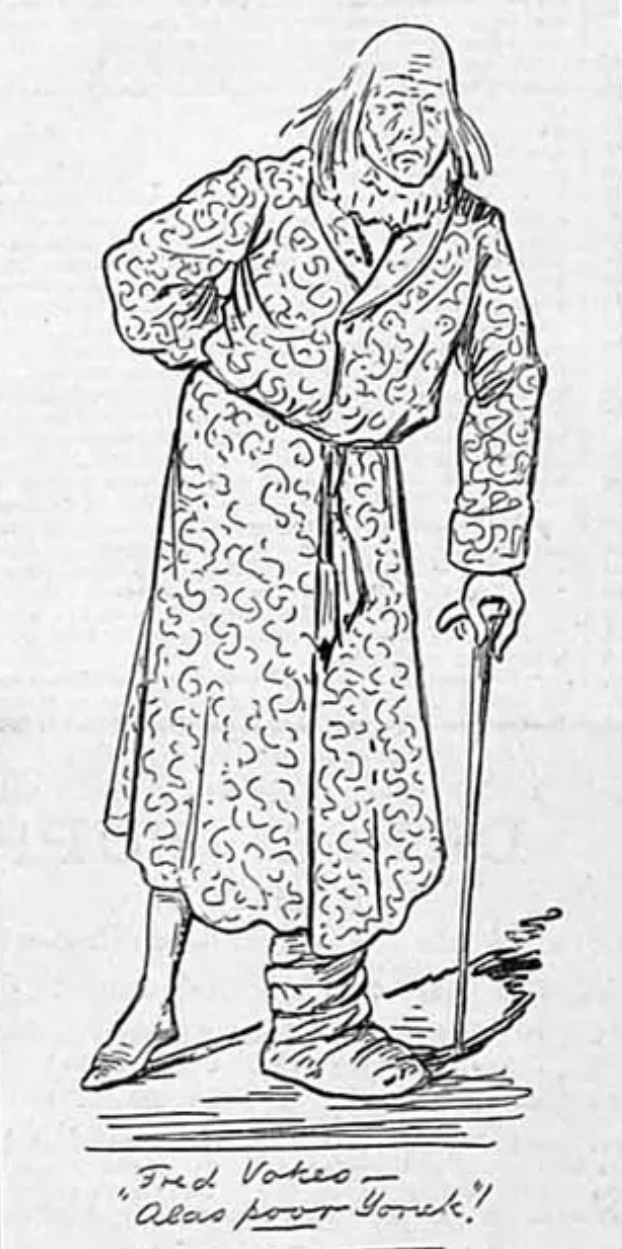
As Baron Pumpernickel in Cinderella - The Illustrated Sporting and Dramatic News (1878)

The piece that most successfully carried an audience by storm was The Belles of the Kitchen, in which Fred Vokes played Timotheus Gibbs and in which the Vokes Family made its debut in the United States at the Union Square Theatre in New York on 15 April 1872. The family then embarked on a six-month tour of the United States before returning to Britain where in October 1872 they performed Fun in a Fog. They returned to New York in April 1873 at Niblo's Garden and remained in America for the next year and nine months before returning to England. Their next season in America was at the Fifth Avenue Theatre in New York where they remained for three months. The Vokes Family returned to the USA (without Rosina Vokes who had married in 1877) in April 1881 when they appeared at the Globe Theatre in Boston and returned to England in June 1882 but without Fred Vokes; the family returned to the US in Autumn 1882.

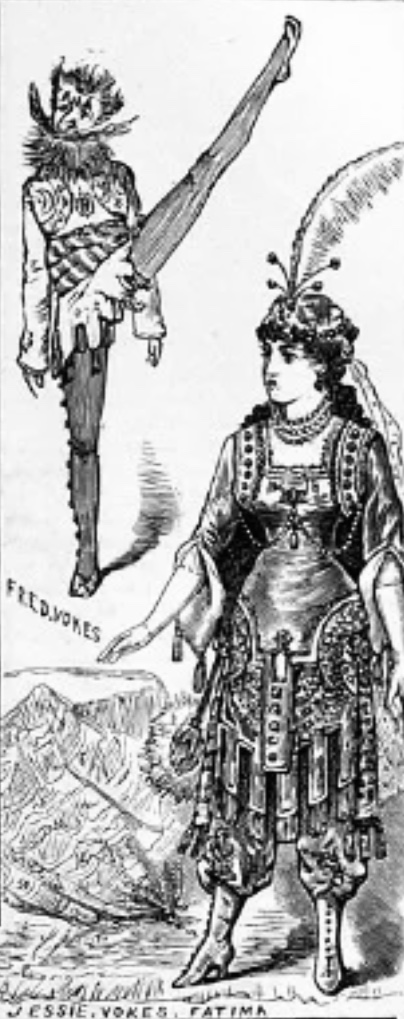
Fred Vokes with sister Jessie Vokes as Fatima in Bluebeard - The Illustrated London News 10 January 1880

They made their last appearance in New York at the Mount Morris Theatre in Harlem in January 1883, returning to England (again without brother Fred) in June 1883. Jessie Vokes's clever recitations and dancing were appreciated, but she was not so prominent in the cast as her siblings Victoria and Fred, who were especially happy in their rendering of the tower scene from Il trovatore, or as Rosina Vokes, who was regarded by the young men as the flower of the family.

For about ten years (with the exception of 1873, when they were touring abroad) they were regulars in the annual Christmas pantomime at Drury Lane, including Humpty Dumpty (1868); Beauty and the Beast! or, Harlequin and Old Mother Bunch (1869); The Dragon of Wantley; or, Harlequin or Old Mother Shipton (1870); King Arthur in Tom Thumb: or, King Arthur and the Knights of the Round Table (1871); Sir Rowland in Children in the Wood (1872); Abanazar in Aladdin or Harlequin and the Wonderful Lamp (1874); Dick Whittington (1875); Ali Baba and the Forty Thieves (1876); The White Cat (1877); Baron Pumpernickel in Cinderella (1878) in which he was required to talk and sing, with less success than his dancing. The critics were not kind concerning the contribution of the Vokes Family to Cinderella, making such comments as: "They were on stage far too long", "They are sublimely indifferent as to whether the story of Cinderella be a Sanskrit myth or a Greek fable", "If they want to retain their hold on the public, they should get someone to concoct for them new modes". Not being the draw they had once been, the Vokes Family discovered the pantomime was in debt and refused to drop their salaries which F. B. Chatterton the manager could not meet, and the production closed owing £36,000 in February 1879 putting all involved out of work. The family returned to Drury Lane in 1879 in the pantomime Bluebeard in which Fred Vokes played the title role. This was to be their last pantomime at Drury Lane as by now the public were wearying of the Vokes Family who had dominated the pantomime at Drury Lane for more than a decade but who had never updated their routines. The new manager Augustus Harris found the Vokes Family to be too demanding, while they considered him a tyrant. For Christmas 1880 the family were at Covent Garden in Valentine and Orson; or, Harlequin and the Magic Shield written by F. C. Burnand.

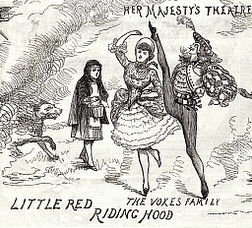
The Vokes Family in Little Red Riding Hood at Her Majesty's Theatre (Christmas 1883)

Of his appearance and that of his sisters in Tom Thumb at Drury Lane in 1871 the critic of The Times wrote:

"The manner in which first the crown and then the wig of Mr Fred Vokes as King Arthur persisted in tumbling off while that monarch indulged in unusual gyrations excited tumultuous laughter, and if there could be anything funnier than Mr Fred Vokes’ 'split' dance it was his step dance, Lancashire clogs, Cornish reels, transatlantic walk-rounds, cellar flaps and breakdowns, college hornpipes and Irish jigs. Nothing in the way of dances came amiss to the airy monarch whose legs and arms seemed to spin round on pivots and who seemed at once to stimulate the actions of the cockchafer and the grasshopper.

He was well assisted by Mr. Fawdon Vokes as the court fool who had apparently danced himself out of his mind in his infancy and had lived on tarantula spiders ever since. All the Misses Vokes (Victoria, Jessie and Rosina), fascinated in their attire, ravishing as to their back hair and amazing in their agility, were fully equal to the occasion. When they didn’t dance they sang and danced simultaneously and then all the Vokeses jumped on one another's backs and careered – so it seemed - into immeasurable space.’

== Tumultuous marriage ==
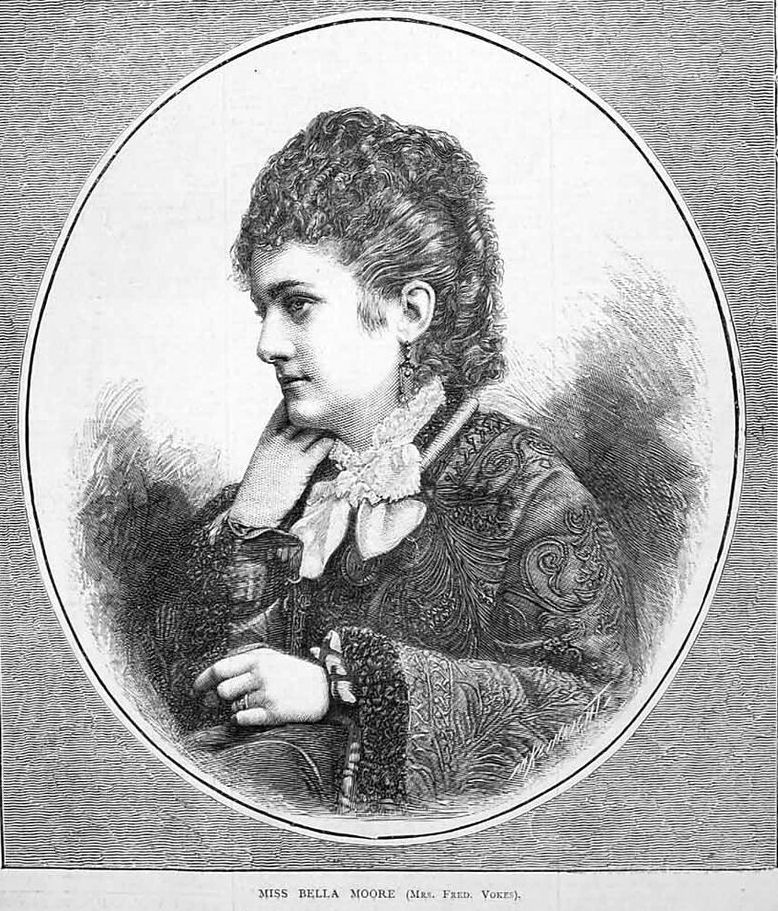
Mrs Bella Vokes - The Illustrated Sporting and Dramatic News (1877)

On 25 March 1873 at St James' church in Piccadilly in London Vokes married the actress Martha Isabella 'Bella' Moore (1854-1913), the daughter of George Washington Moore of the Moore and Burgess minstrels, with whom he had six children, only one of whom survived into adulthood: Lillian Victoria Vokes (1874–1952); Frederick George Vokes (1876–1876); Frederick Mortimer Vokes (1877–1881), Violet Maud Vokes (1879–1887) and two unknown children. His wife occasionally appeared with the Vokes Family - usually as a replacement for Rosina Vokes after her marriage in 1877 following which she left the troupe.

In his later years it would appear that he lived a life of excess. As a result, the marriage proved to be a difficult one, with Bella Vokes beginning divorce proceedings against him in January 1888 because of his alleged adultery with an Edith Appleby in 1884 at their home, Burleigh House on Loudon Road in St John's Wood, and with Alice Aynsley Cook at various places in 1887 and 1888. Bella Vokes alleged that in July 1881 in New York Fred Vokes "struck her with a large lobster he was carrying and knocked her about and abused her with foul language and threatened to cut her throat" while at the Queen's Hotel in Toronto "he struck [her] in the face two severe blows and spat in her face and abused her causing her great pain and suffering she being then pregnant with child." In Pittsburgh in 1881 he was alleged to have given her a black eye by striking her several times in the face, while in 1883 at Harrogate he threw a brandy and soda in her face and a bottle of stout over her before kicking her over and threatening to "spoil her face".

Fred Vokes, for his part, largely denied all his wife's allegations of violence and adultery and counter-petitioned, admitting the adultery with Edith Appleby but claiming that his wife had condoned it. He in turn stated that his wife had committed adultery with a John Wynot, Ashley MacEvoy, a Mr Benson, Samuel Adams, Cyril Ponsonby and other persons known to him. Bella Vokes further denied ever condoning her husband's adulteries and denied ever committing adultery herself. Fred Vokes died before the matter could be settled in Court.

== Death ==
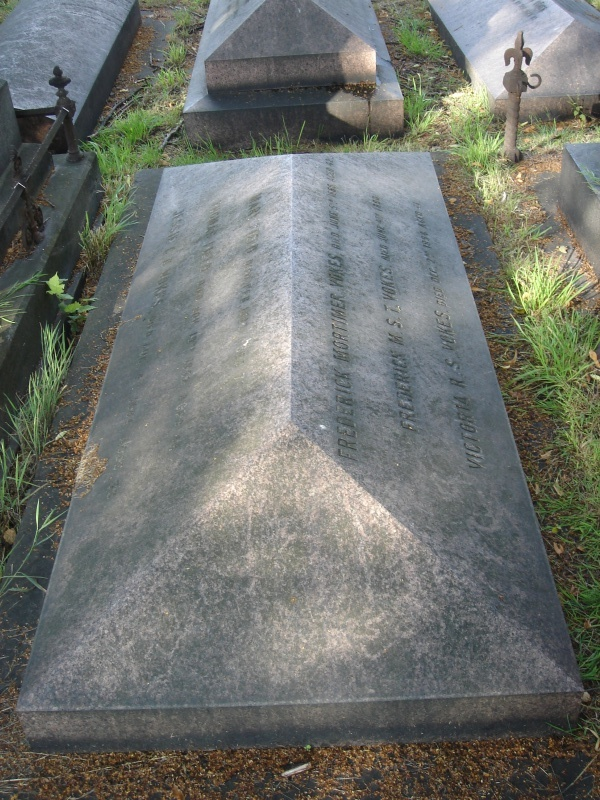
Family funerary monument, Brompton Cemetery, London

In 1888 he was forced by illness to cancel his appearances and on 3 June aged 42 he died of paralysis at the house of his sister Victoria Vokes. He was buried in the family plot in Brompton Cemetery.

The Vokes family through their mother's brother, actor William F. Wood (1799–1855), were first cousins of American actress Rose Wood Morrison, who was the maternal grandmother of Hollywood starlets Constance Bennett and Joan Bennett.
