= Rosina Vokes =

English actor and dancer (1854–1894)

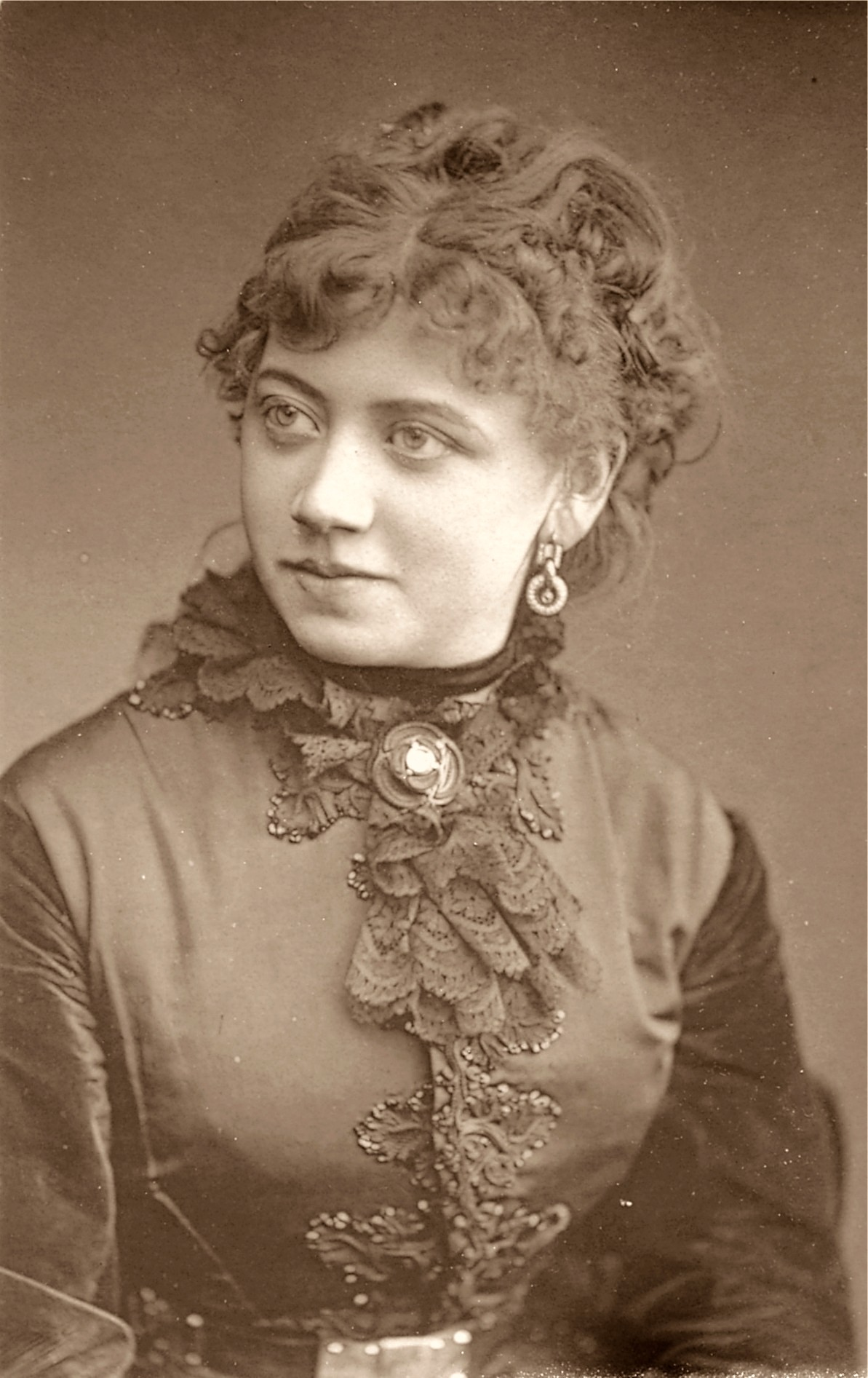
Rosina Vokes in 1875

Rosina Vokes (18 October 1854 – 27 January 1894) was a British music hall, pantomime and burlesque actress and dancer and a member of the Vokes Family troupe of entertainers before having a successful career in her own right in North America from 1885 to 1893.

Theodocia Rosina Vokes was born in Clapham, London, in 1854. She was a member of the well-known Vokes Family made up of three sisters, a brother and "foster brother" (actually the actor Walter Fawdon (1844–1904) who changed his name to Fawdon Vokes and outlived the rest of his "family") popular in the pantomime theatres of 1870s London and in the United States. Their father, Frederick Strafford Thwaites Vokes (1816–1890), was a theatrical costumier and wigmaker who owned a shop at 19 Henrietta Street, Covent Garden. Their mother Sarah Jane Biddulph née Godden (1818–1897) was the daughter of Welsh-born strolling player Will Wood and his actress wife.

== The Vokes Family ==
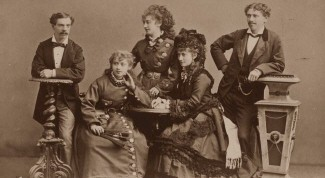
The Vokes Family in about 1875: (l-r) Fawdon Vokes, Rosina, Victoria, Jessie and Fred Vokes

First as The Vokes Children and later The Vokes Family, they began to perform at music halls and pantomimes, and by their agility and humour made the name well known to English and American theatre-goers. They made their début on Christmas night in 1861 at Howard's Operetta House in Edinburgh and made their London début at the Alhambra Theatre in 1862, when they were billed as 'The Five Little Vokes'. They appeared at the Lyceum Theatre in London on 26 December 1868 in the pantomime Humpty Dumpty written by Edward Litt Laman Blanchard, and they traveled through a great part of the civilized world. Early in their career, at the Lyceum Theatre in London, they danced in W. S. Gilbert's pantomime Harlequin Cock Robin and Jenny Wren.

She attracted special notice first as one of the children in Charles Reade and Tom Taylor’s comedy Masks and Faces, dancing, with her sister Jessie Vokes, a jig, in which Benjamin Nottingham Webster played Triplet at the London Standard Theatre. With her brothers and sisters, Fred and Fawdon and Victoria and Jessie, she began her career as The Vokes Children, which was afterward changed to The Vokes Family, at the Operetta House in Edinburgh. They first appeared in the popular show The Belles of the Kitchen on 27 February 1869 at the Standard Theatre in London. Their success was pronounced and continuous. They made their Paris debut in August 1870 at the Théâtre du Châtelet where they were an immediate success, but with the outbreak of the Franco-Prussian War it became unsafe to remain and they left the city with just a few hours notice. Back in London she appeared with the rest of the Vokes Family in Tom Thumb the Great; or, Harlequin King Arthur and the Knights of the Round Table in their début performance at the Theatre Royal, Drury Lane in Christmas 1871.

== Theatrical career ==
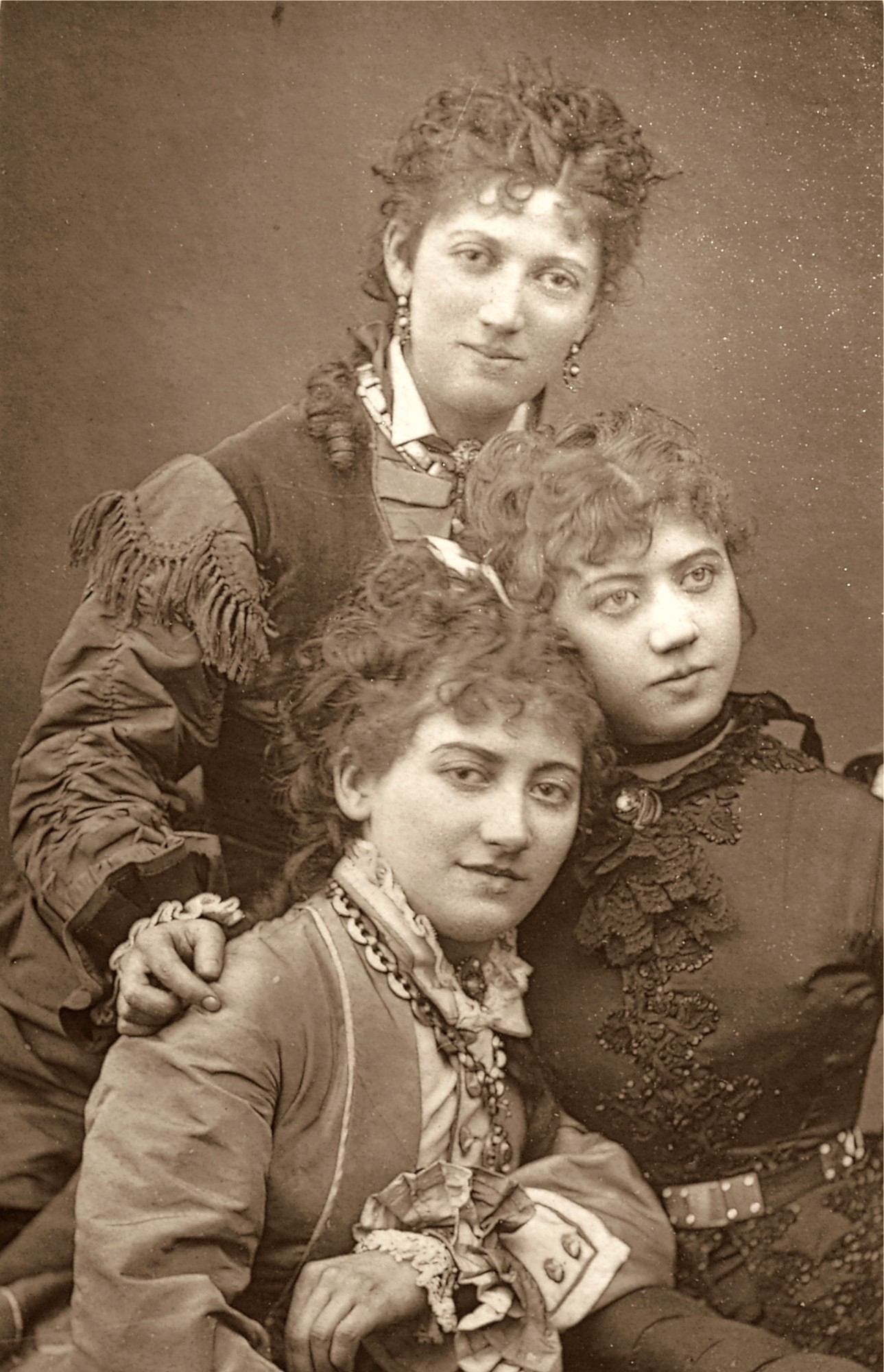
Jessie, Rosina and Victoria Vokes

The piece that most successfully carried an audience by storm was The Belles of the Kitchen, in which the Vokes Family made its debut in the United States at the Union Square Theatre in New York on 15 April 1872. The family then embarked on a six month tour of the United States before returning to Britain where in October 1872 they performed Fun in a Fog. They returned to New York in April 1873 at Niblo's Garden and remained in America for the next year and nine months before returning to England. Their next season in America was at the Fifth Avenue Theatre in New York where they remained for three months. Older sister Jessie Vokes’s clever recitations and dancing were appreciated, but she was not so prominent in the cast as her siblings Victoria and Fred, who were especially happy in their rendering of the tower scene from Il trovatore, or as Rosina Vokes, who was regarded by the young men as the flower of the family.

== Solo career ==
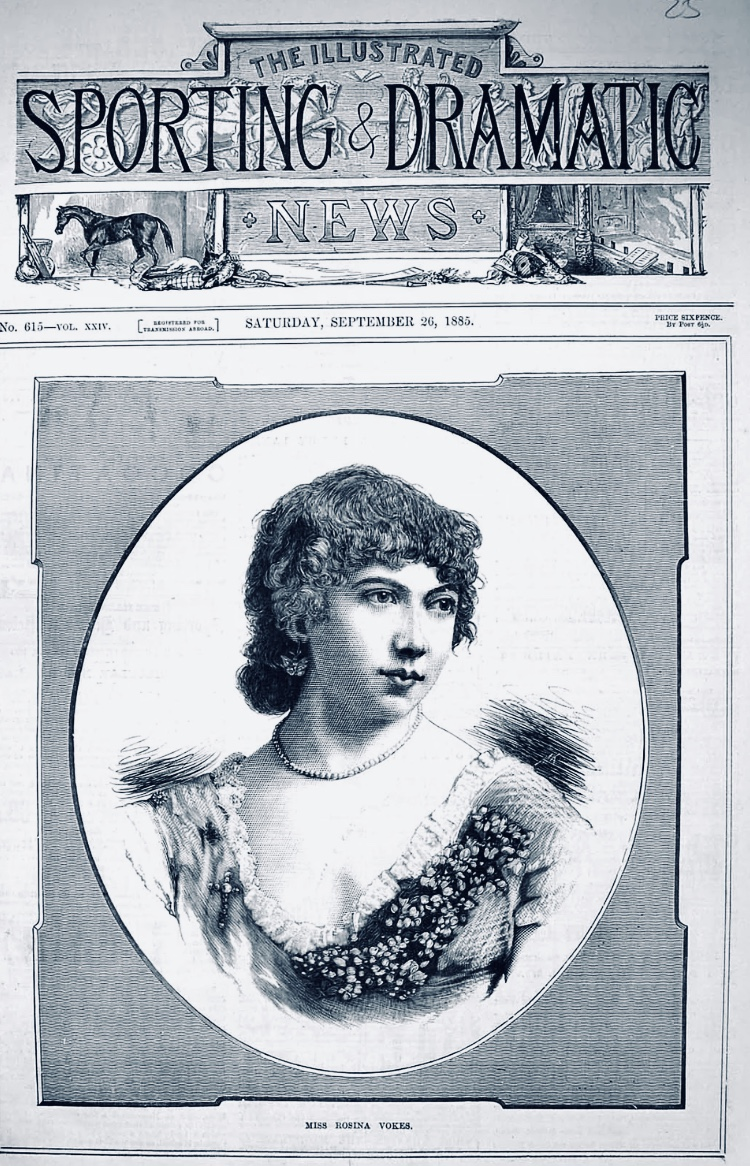
Rosina Vokes on the cover of The Illustrated Sporting and Dramatic News (1885)

For about ten years (with the exception of 1873, when they were touring abroad) the Vokes Family were regulars in the annual Christmas pantomime at Drury Lane (with the exception of 1873, when they were touring abroad), their first appearance being in Humpty Dumpty (1868) followed the next year Beauty and the Beast, or Harlequin and Old Mother Bunch in 1869. At Drury Lane in February 1870 she was Albert to the William Tell of Thomas King in Sheridan Knowles's William Tell. Also at Drury Lane she appeared in The Dragon of Wantley; or, Harlequin or Old Mother Shipton (1870); Tom Thumb; or, King Arthur and the Knights of the Round Table (1871); as Mary in Children in the Wood (1872); was the Princess in Aladdin or Harlequin and the Wonderful Lamp (1874); Dick Whittington (1875); and Ai Baba and the Forty Thieves (1876) as Fatima.

On 10 March 1877 she married Cecil Jalland Page Clay (1848–1920), the author of A Pantomime Rehearsal and the brother of the composer Frederick Clay. Their children were: Herbert James Clay (1878–1959) and Edith Florence Elfrida Clay (1880–1966). On her marriage she retired from the English stage. However, she had always been considered "infinitely the cleverest, the most bewitching" of the Vokes Family who could act and sing as well as dance, and who could have had a great career as a solo artist had it not been for her loyalty to her family, to whom she was very close.

In October 1885 she was invited to tour America with her husband, taking with her a small theatrical company which included Brandon Thomas, Weedon Grossmith and other well-known actors and played in light comedy and burlesque. One newspaper wrote of her, "She is still young, agile, slender, and graceful; the piquant prettiness of her face and the droll charm of her manner still exert a strong influence upon the susceptible spectator." Despite her growing weakness due to tuberculosis, she and her company made an exhausting nine-year cross-country tour of the main cities of the United States and Canada, playing in G. W. Godfrey's The Parvenu, in Pinero's The Schoolmistress, Grundy's The Milliner's Bill and The Silver Shield, and in The Circus Rider, Maid Marian, The Tinted Venus, My Uncle's Will, A Lesson in Love and her husband's A Pantomime Rehearsal.

Her last appearance on the stage was made at the National Theatre in Washington D.C. in December 1893, and while it was clear to audiences and critics that she was increasingly unwell, her performances were unaffected, while critics regarded her continuing to work as artistic heroism. Her numerous obituaries described her as a popular actress loved by both her fellow artists and audiences.

Rosina Vokes died at Babbacombe in Torquay in January 1894.

The Vokes family through their mother's brother, actor William F. Wood (1799–1855), were first cousins of American actress Rose Wood Morrison, who was the maternal grandmother of Hollywood starlets Constance Bennett and Joan Bennett.
