= Fawdon Vokes =

British music hall and pantomime performer

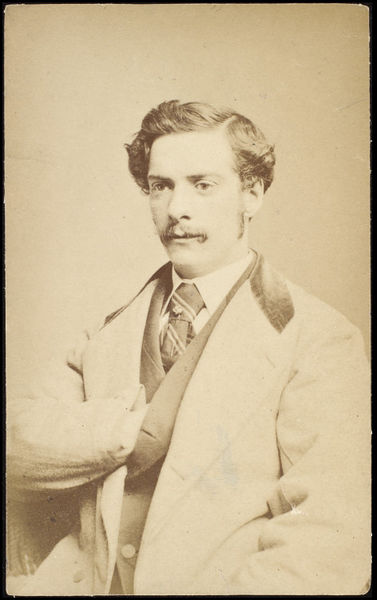
Fawdon Vokes c 1875

Fawdon Vokes (1844 – 1904) was a British music hall, pantomime and burlesque actor and dancer who performed as a member of the Vokes Family of entertainers popular in the 1870s in Great Britain and the USA. For more than ten years they were the central attraction at the annual pantomime at the Theatre Royal, Drury Lane from 1868 to 1879 when their popularity began to wane.

He was born as Walter Fawdon in Soho in London and on joining the Vokes Family troupe changed his name to Walter Vokes, being billed as the "foster brother" of Fred, Jessie, Rosina and Victoria Vokes. In the 1871 Census he was living with the Vokes' above the family business at 19 Henrietta Street in Covent Garden in London on which he was listed as "no relation".

== The Vokes Family ==
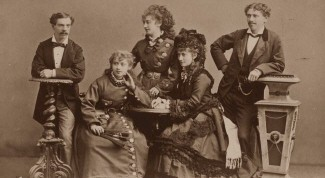
The Vokes Family in about 1875: (l-r) Fawdon Vokes, Rosina, Victoria, Jessie and Fred Vokes

With the Vokes Family he performed at music halls and at pantomimes both for British and American theatre-goers. They made their début on Christmas night in 1861 at Howard's Operetta House in Edinburgh and made their London début at the Alhambra Theatre in 1862 when they were billed as 'The Five Little Vokes'. They appeared at the Lyceum Theatre in London on 26 December 1868 in Edward Litt Laman Blanchard's pantomime Humpty Dumpty. Early in their career, at the Lyceum Theatre in London, they danced in W. S. Gilbert's pantomime Harlequin Cock Robin and Jenny Wren.

With the Vokes Family he first appeared as Wiggins in the popular The Belles of the Kitchen on 27 February 1869 at the Standard Theatre in London. Their success was pronounced and continuous. They made their Paris debut in August 1870 at the Théâtre du Châtelet where they were an immediate success, but with the outbreak of the Franco-Prussian War it became unsafe to remain and they left the city with just a few hours notice. Back in London he appeared with the rest of the Vokes Family in Tom Thumb the Great; or, Harlequin King Arthur and the Knights of the Round Table in their début performance at the Theatre Royal, Drury Lane in Christmas 1871.

== Theatrical career ==
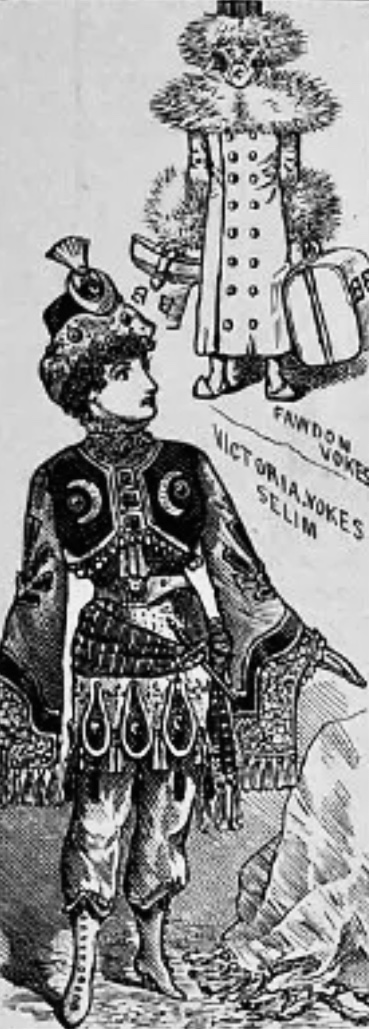
Fawdon Vokes as Shacabac with Victoria Vokes as Selim in Bluebeard - The Illustrated London News 10 January 1880

The piece that most successfully carried an audience by storm was The Belles of the Kitchen in which the Vokes Family made its debut in the United States at the Union Square Theatre in New York on 15 April 1872. The family then embarked on a six-month tour of the United States before returning to Britain where in October 1872 they performed Fun in a Fog. They returned to New York in April 1873 at Niblo's Garden and remained in America for the next year and nine months before returning to England. Their next season in America was at the Fifth Avenue Theatre in New York where they remained for three months. The Vokes Family returned to the USA (without Rosina Vokes who had married in 1877) in April 1881 when they appeared at the Globe Theatre in Boston and returned to England in June 1882 but without Fred Vokes; the family returned to the US in autumn 1882.

They made their last appearance in New York at the Mount Morris Theatre in Harlem in January 1883, returning to England (again without Fred) in June 1883. Jessie Vokes's clever recitations and dancing were appreciated, but she was not so prominent in the cast as her siblings Victoria and Fred, who were especially happy in their rendering of the tower scene from Il trovatore, or as Rosina Vokes, who was regarded by the young men as the flower of the family.

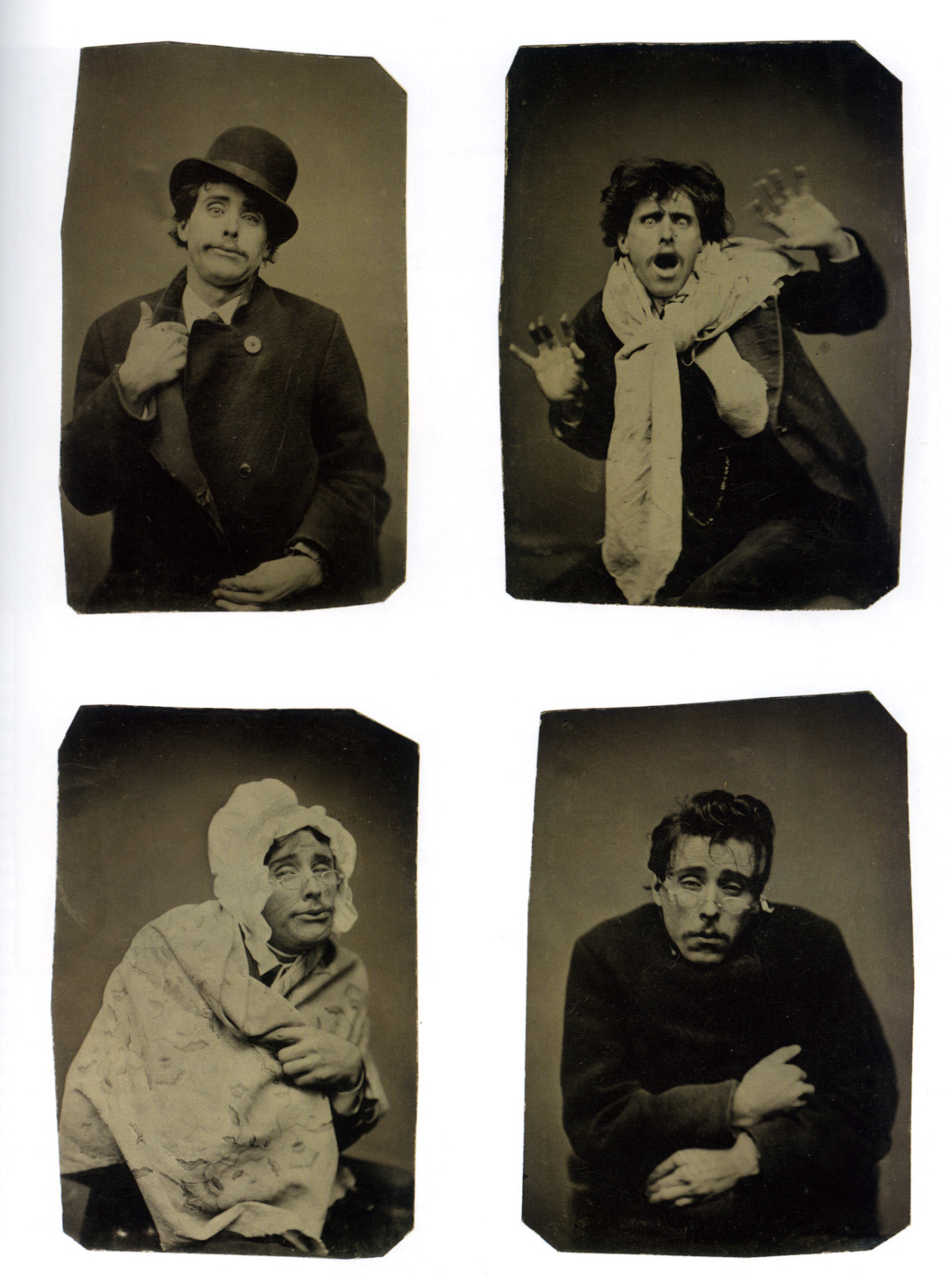
Fawdon Vokes poses as some of his characters - probably in Philadelphia (1872)

For about ten years (with the exception of 1873, when they were touring abroad) they were regulars in the annual Christmas pantomime at Drury Lane, including Humpty Dumpty (1868); Beauty and the Beast! or, Harlequin and Old Mother Bunch (1869); The Dragon of Wantley; or, Harlequin or Old Mother Shipton (1870); the Jester in Tom Thumb: or, King Arthur and the Knights of the Round Table (1871); Geoffrey Nimble Legs in Children in the Wood (1872); Karzac in Aladdin or Harlequin and the Wonderful Lamp (1874) in which he never spoke but was "thoroughly efficient" in all he did; Dick Whittington (1875); Ali Baba and the Forty Thieves (1876); The White Cat (1877); Kobold in Cinderella (1878) in which he was "remarkable for his activity. He spared himself not a jot to add to the fun. The critics were not kind concerning the contribution of the Vokes Family to Cinderella, making such comments as: "They were on stage far too long", "They are sublimely indifferent as to whether the story of Cinderella be a Sanskrit myth or a Greek fable", "If they want to retain their hold on the public, they should get someone to concoct for them new modes". Not being the draw they had once been, the Vokes Family discovered the pantomime was in debt and refused to drop their salaries which F. B. Chatterton the manager could not meet, and the production closed owing £36,000 in February 1879 putting all involved out of work. The family returned to Drury Lane in 1879 in the pantomime Bluebeard in which Fawdon Vokes was Shacabac. This was to be their last pantomime at Drury Lane as by now the public were wearying of the Vokes Family who had dominated the pantomime at Drury Lane for more than a decade but who had never updated their routines. The new manager Augustus Harris found the Vokes Family to be too demanding, while they considered him a tyrant. For Christmas 1880 the family were at Covent Garden in Valentine and Orson; or, Harlequin and the Magic Shield written by F. C. Burnand.

In a review of Tom Thumb at Drury Lane in 1871 the critic of The Times wrote:

"[Fred Vokes] was well assisted by Mr. Fawdon Vokes as the court fool who had apparently danced himself out of his mind in his infancy and had lived on tarantula spiders ever since. All the Misses Vokes (Victoria, Jessie and Rosina), fascinated in their attire, ravishing as to their back hair and amazing in their agility, were fully equal to the occasion. When they didn’t dance they sang and danced simultaneously and then all the Vokeses jumped on one another's backs and careered – so it seemed - into immeasurable space."

In 1891 he played Bobbins opposite Victoria Vokes in Hubby at the Shaftesbury Theatre in London.

== Later years ==
In 1901 Walter Fawdon Vokes was "living on [his] own means" at 3 Mintholme Road in Battersea with his wife Ann Vokes and children Herbert Walter Henry Fawdon Vokes (1888-1957) and Irene Eugénie Fawdon Vokes (1893-1971).

Dying in 1904, he outlived the rest of the Vokes Family.

== See also ==
- Vokes family
- Fred Vokes
- Jessie Vokes
- Rosina Vokes
- Victoria Vokes
