= Jessie Vokes =

British music hall, pantomime and burlesque actress and dancer

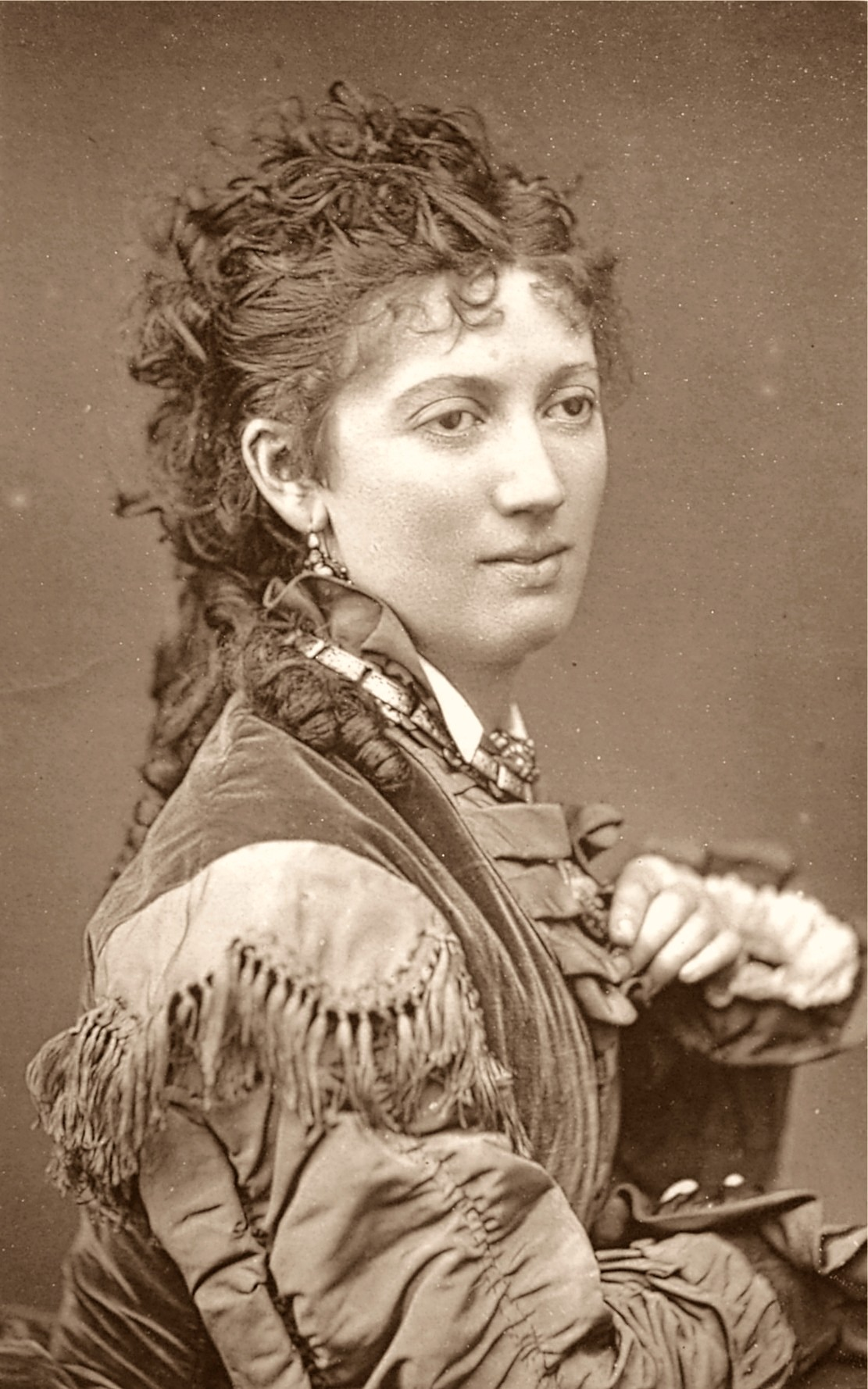
Jessie Vokes in 1875

Jessie Vokes (14 June 1848 – 7 August 1884) was a British music hall, pantomime and burlesque actress and dancer of the 19th-century and a member of the Vokes Family of entertainers. For more than ten years they were the central attraction at the annual pantomime at the Theatre Royal, Drury Lane from 1868 to 1879 when their popularity began to wane.

== Early life and career ==
Jessie Catherine Biddulph Vokes was born in Clerkenwell, London in 1848 and was a member of the well-known Vokes Family made up of three sisters, a brother and "foster brother" (actually actor Walter Fawdon (1844–1904) who changed his name to Fawdon Vokes and who outlived the rest of his "family") popular in the pantomime theatres of 1870s London and in the United States. Their father, Frederick Strafford Thwaites Vokes (1816–1890), was a theatrical costumier and wigmaker who owned a shop at 19 Henrietta Street, Covent Garden. Their mother Sarah Jane Biddulph née Godden (1818–1897) was the daughter of Welsh-born strolling player Will Wood and his actress wife.

Jessie Vokes, the eldest of the sisters, was educated for the stage from an early age, being tutored in acting by Mr. Chadwick and in dancing, in which she excelled, by Mr. Flexmore. When she was only 4 years old she appeared at the Surrey Theatre, where later she played in children’s characters including as Teddy in Dred, or, The Dismal Swamp and Florence in The Dumb Savoyard. The Census of 1861 has the 13 year-old Jessie Vokes listed as an "Actress".

== The Vokes Family ==
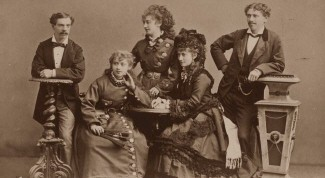
The Vokes Family in about 1875: (l-r) Fawdon Vokes, Rosina, Victoria, Jessie and Fred Vokes

First as the "Vokes Children" and later the "Vokes Family" they began to perform at music halls and at pantomimes, and by their agility and humour made the name well known to English and American theatre-goers. They made their début on Christmas night in 1861 at Howard's Operetta House in Edinburgh and made their London début at the Alhambra Theatre in 1862 when they were billed as 'The Five Little Vokes'. They appeared at the Lyceum Theatre in London on 26 December 1868 in the pantomime Humpty Dumpty written by Edward Litt Laman Blanchard, and they traveled through a great part of the civilized world. Early in their career, at the Lyceum Theatre in London, they danced in W. S. Gilbert's pantomime Harlequin Cock Robin and Jenny Wren. Their first appearance in pantomime at Drury Lane was in Beauty and the Beast, or Harlequin and Old Mother Bunch in 1869. They first appeared in the popular The Belles of the Kitchen on 27 February 1869 at the Standard Theatre in London. They made their Paris debut in August 1870 at the Théâtre du Châtelet where they were an immediate success, but with the outbreak of the Franco-Prussian War it became unsafe to remain and they left the city with just a few hours notice. Back in London she appeared with the rest of the Vokes Family in Tom Thumb the Great; or, Harlequin King Arthur and the Knights of the Round Table in their début performance at the Theatre Royal, Drury Lane in Christmas 1871.

== Theatrical career ==
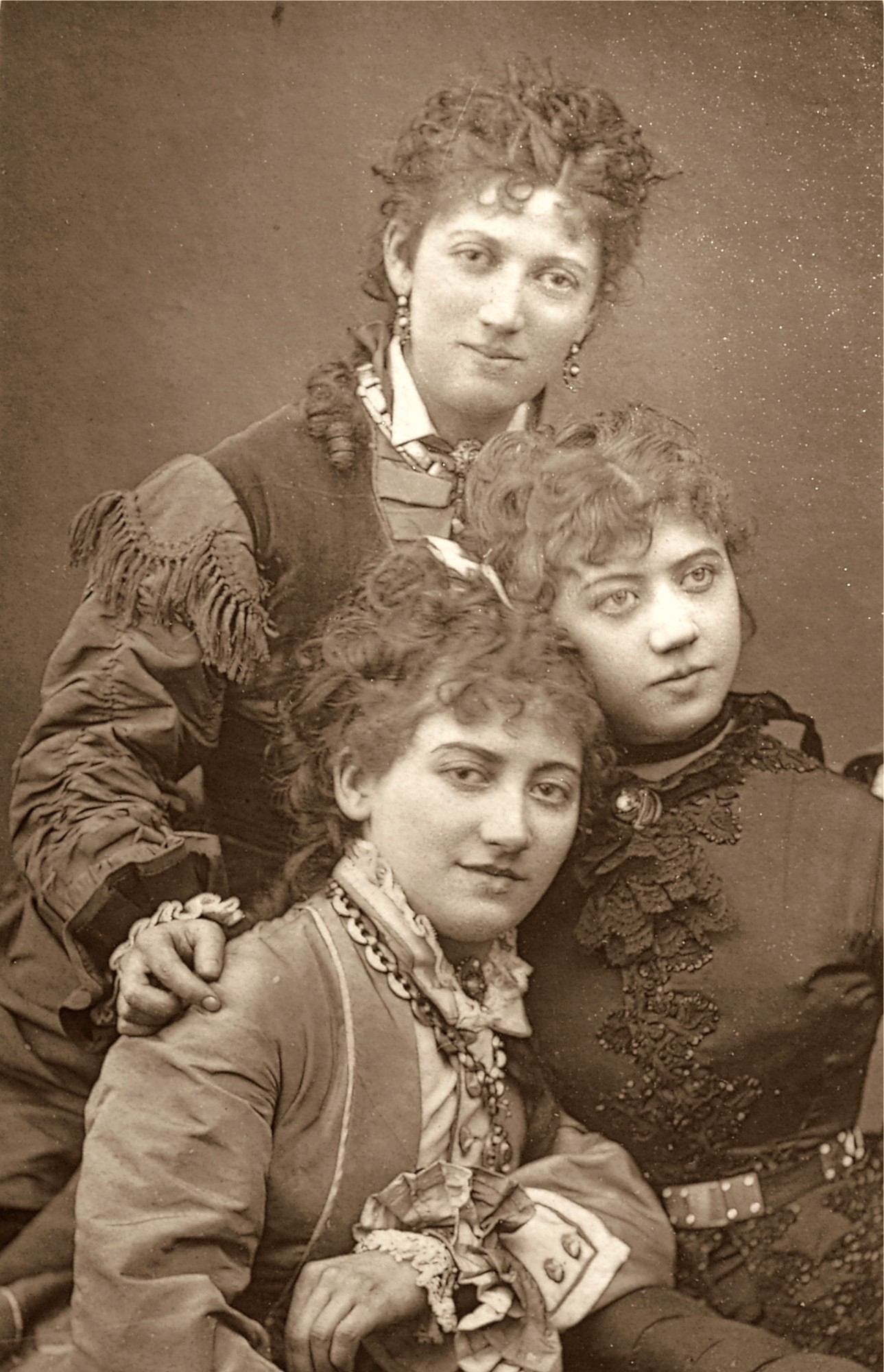
Jessie, Rosina and Victoria Vokes

In the early part of her career she played Mamillius in The Winter’s Tale; Prince Arthur in King John, and the Prince of Wales in Richard III. She attracted special notice first as one of the children in Charles Reade and Tom Taylor’s comedy Masks and Faces, dancing, with her sister, a jig, in which Benjamin Nottingham Webster played Triplet at the London Standard Theatre. With her brothers and sisters, Fred and Fawdon and Victoria and Rosina, she began her career as "The Vokes Children," which was afterward changed to "The Vokes Family," at the Operetta House in Edinburgh. Their success was pronounced and continuous.

The piece that most successfully carried an audience by storm was The Belles of the Kitchen, in which the Vokes Family made its debut in the United States at the Union Square Theatre in New York on 15 April 1872 and in which Jessie Vokes played Lucinda Scrubbs. The family then embarked on a six-month tour of the United States before returning to Britain where in October 1872 they performed Fun in a Fog. They returned to New York in April 1873 at Niblo's Garden and remained in America for the next year and nine months before returning to England. Their next season in America was at the Fifth Avenue Theatre in New York where they remained for three months. The Vokes Family returned to the USA (without Rosina Vokes who had married in 1877) in April 1881 when they appeared at the Globe Theatre in Boston and returned to England in June 1882 but without Fred Vokes; the family returned to the US in Autumn 1882. They made their last appearance in New York at the Mount Morris Theatre in Harlem in January 1883, returning to England (again without brother Fred) in June 1883. Jessie Vokes’s clever recitations and dancing were appreciated, but she was not so prominent in the cast as her siblings Victoria and Fred, who were especially happy in their rendering of the tower scene from Il trovatore, or as Rosina Vokes, who was regarded by the young men as the flower of the family.

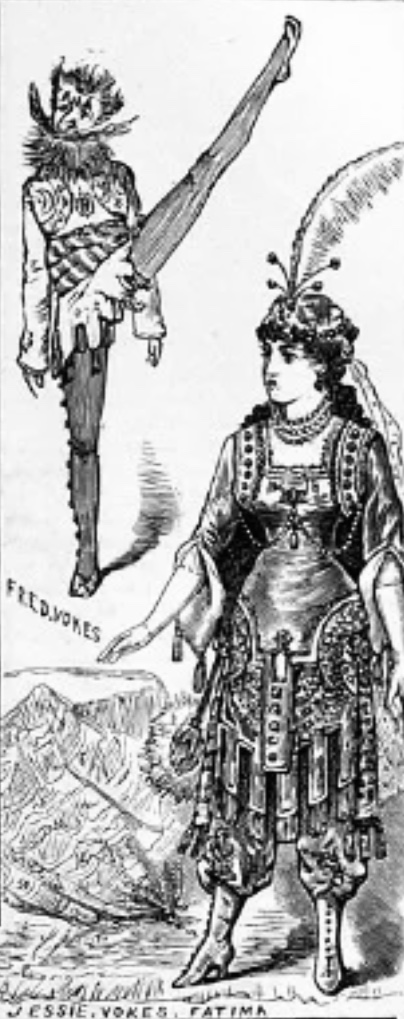
Jessie Vokes as Fatima in Bluebeard – The Illustrated London News 10 January 1880

For about ten years (with the exception of 1873, when they were touring abroad) they were regulars in the annual Christmas pantomime at Drury Lane, including Humpty Dumpty (1868); Beauty and the Beast! or, Harlequin and Old Mother Bunch (1869); The Dragon of Wantley; or, Harlequin or Old Mother Shipton (1870); Tom Thumb; or, King Arthur and the Knights of the Round Table (1871); Mistress Winifred in Children in the Wood (1872); Aladdin or Harlequin and the Wonderful Lamp (1874), in which Jessie Vokes played the Genius of the Lamp in which role "her grace and ability as a dancer have in no degree diminished."; Dick Whittington (1875); Ali Baba and the Forty Thieves (1876) in which Jessie Vokes played Abdallah with The Era writing of her "Miss Jessie looked and played in most bewitching fashion."; The White Cat (1877) in which she was Prince Nectar the Nimble, and played Prince Amabel in Cinderella (1878). The critics were not kind concerning the contribution of the Vokes Family to Cinderella, making such comments as: "They were on stage far too long", "They are sublimely indifferent as to whether the story of Cinderella be a Sanskrit myth or a Greek fable", "If they want to retain their hold on the public, they should get someone to concoct for them new modes". Not being the draw they had once been, the Vokes Family discovered the pantomime was in debt and refused to drop their salaries which F. B. Chatterton the manager could not meet, and the production closed owing £36,000 in February 1879 putting all involved out of work. The family returned to Drury Lane in 1879 in the pantomime Bluebeard in which Jessie Vokes played Fatima. This was to be their last pantomime at Drury Lane as by now the public were wearying of the Vokes Family who had dominated the pantomime at Drury Lane for more than a decade but who had never updated their routines. The new manager Augustus Harris found the Vokes Family to be too demanding, while they considered him a tyrant. For Christmas 1880 the family were at Covent Garden in Valentine and Orson; or, Harlequin and the Magic Shield written by F. C. Burnand.

Of the appearance of the Vokes Family in Tom Thumb at Drury Lane in 1871 the critic of The Times wrote:

"The manner in which first the crown and then the wig of Mr Fred Vokes as King Arthur persisted in tumbling off while that monarch indulged in unusual gyrations excited tumultuous laughter, and if there could be anything funnier than Mr Fred Vokes’ 'split' dance it was his step dance, Lancashire clogs, Cornish reels, transatlantic walk-rounds, cellar flaps and breakdowns, college hornpipes and Irish jigs. Nothing in the way of dances came amiss to the airy monarch whose legs and arms seemed to spin round on pivots and who seemed at once to stimulate the actions of the cockchafer and the grasshopper.

He was well assisted by Mr. Fawdon Vokes as the court fool who had apparently danced himself out of his mind in his infancy and had lived on tarantula spiders ever since. All the Misses Vokes (Victoria, Jessie and Rosina), fascinated in their attire, ravishing as to their back hair and amazing in their agility, were fully equal to the occasion. When they didn’t dance they sang and danced simultaneously and then all the Vokeses jumped on one another's backs and careered – so it seemed – into immeasurable space.’

The Vokes family through their mother's brother, actor William F. Wood (1799–1855), were first cousins of American actress Rose Wood Morrison, who was the maternal grandmother of Hollywood starlets Constance Bennett and Joan Bennett.

== Death ==
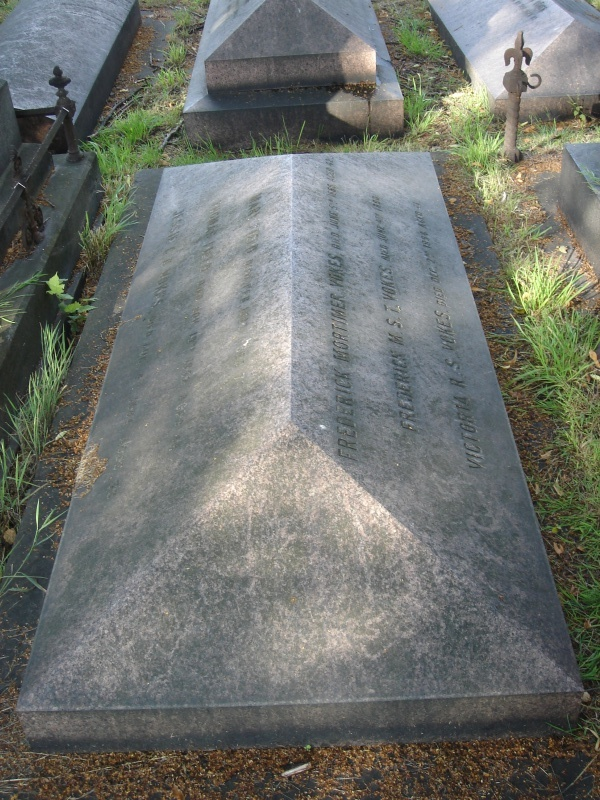
Family funerary monument, Brompton Cemetery, London

Jessie Vokes died aged 36 in 1884 at Burleigh House on Loudoun Road in St John's Wood in London and is buried in the family plot in Brompton Cemetery in London. Her death, the death of her brother Fred Vokes and the marriage of her sister Rosina Vokes resulted in the break up of the family troupe. She never married and in her will left £3,034 15s.

== See also ==
- Vokes family
- Fawdon Vokes
- Fred Vokes
- Rosina Vokes
- Victoria Vokes
