= Charlotte Deans =

English strolling player (1768–1859)

Charlotte Deans (September 1, 1768 – March 14, 1859) was a strolling player who was born in Wigton, Cumbria.

== Life ==
Deans was born on September 1, 1768, to Alice Howard and attorney Henry Lowes, one of three children who survived until adulthood.

In 1787 she eloped with an actor William Morel Johnston and married him in Gretna Green. Deans joined his company, Naylor's Company of Comedians, and the couple had 12 children before Johnston died in 1801. Following his death, Deans joined another company, Mr Hobson’s Company of Comedians which at the time was based in Penrith.

In the year 1803, Charlotte Deans married another travelling actor, Thomas Deans (1781–1859). The Deans had a further five children

Charlotte Deans's memoirs of her life as a strolling player were published in 1837. Rona Munro’s 1995 play The Maiden Stone is partly based on Deans's life.

The musical “Barnstormers”, based on the life of Charlotte Deans, written by Mitch Binns and directed by Tony Heywood, was produced at the Hen and Chickens Theatre in July 1986.

== Death ==
Deans died on March 14, 1859, in Bothergate, Carlisle.
