= Vokes family =

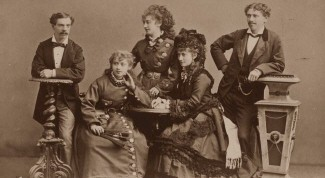
The Vokes Family in about 1875: (l-r) Fawdon, Rosina, Victoria, Jessie and Fred Vokes

The Vokes family were three sisters, one brother and an actor (Walter Fawdon, who changed his name to Vokes) who were popular in the pantomime theatres of 1870s London and in the United States. Their father, Frederick Strafford Thwaites Vokes (1816-1890), was a theatrical costumier and wigmaker who owned a shop at 19 Henrietta Street, Covent Garden. Their mother Sarah Jane Biddulph née Godden (1818-1897) was the daughter of Welsh-born strolling player Will Wood and his actress wife.

They were:

- Fawdon Vokes (born Walter Fawdon; 1844–1904), actor
- Fred Vokes (1846–1888), actor and dancer
- Jessie Vokes (1848–1884), actress and dancer
- Rosina Vokes (1854–1894), actress
- Victoria Vokes (1853–1894), actress

== History ==
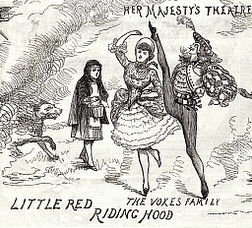
The Vokes Family in Little Red Riding Hood at Her Majesty's Theatre (Christmas 1883)

They made their début on Christmas night in 1861 in Edinburgh and made their London début at the Alhambra Theatre in 1862 when they were billed as 'The Five Little Vokes'. First as the "Vokes Children" and later the "Vokes Family," they began to perform at music halls and at pantomimes, and by their agility and humour made the name well known to English and American theatre-goers. Early in this career, at the Lyceum Theatre, London, they danced in W. S. Gilbert's pantomime, Harlequin Cock Robin and Jenny Wren. They first appeared in the popular The Belles of the Kitchen on 27 February 1869 at the Standard Theatre in London. They made their Paris debut in August 1870 at the Théâtre du Châtelet where they were an immediate success, but with the outbreak of the Franco-Prussian War it became unsafe to remain and they left the city with just a few hours notice.

The piece that most successfully carried an audience by storm was The Belles of the Kitchen, in which the Vokes family made its debut in the United States at the Union Square Theatre in New York on 15 April 1872. The family then embarked on a six month tour of the United States before returning to Britain where in October 1872 they performed Fun in a Fog. They returned to New York in April 1873 at Niblo's Garden and remained in America for the next year and nine months before returning to England. Their next season in America was at the Fifth Avenue Theatre in New York where they remained for three months. The Vokes family returned to the USA without Rosina Vokes in April 1881 when they appeared at the Globe Theatre in Boston and returned to England in June 1882 but without Fred Vokes; the family returned to the USA in Autumn 1882. They made their last appearance in New York at the Mount Morris Theatre in Harlem in January 1883, returning to England (again without brother Fred) in June 1883.

From 1868 to 1879 (with the exception of 1873, when they were touring abroad) the family were regular performers in the annual pantomime at the Theatre Royal, Drury Lane under the management of F. B. Chatterton until the new manager Augustus Harris found them to be too old-fashioned having never updated their dancing routines and too demanding, while they considered him a tyrant.

Fred and two of his sisters are buried in Brompton Cemetery, London.

The Vokeses through their mother's brother, actor William F. Wood (1799-1855), were first cousins of American actress Rose Wood Morrison, who was the maternal grandmother of Hollywood starlets Constance Bennett and Joan Bennett.

This familial connection and an overview of the Vokes' lives is featured in Joan Bennett's memoir, The Bennett Playbill published in 1970.

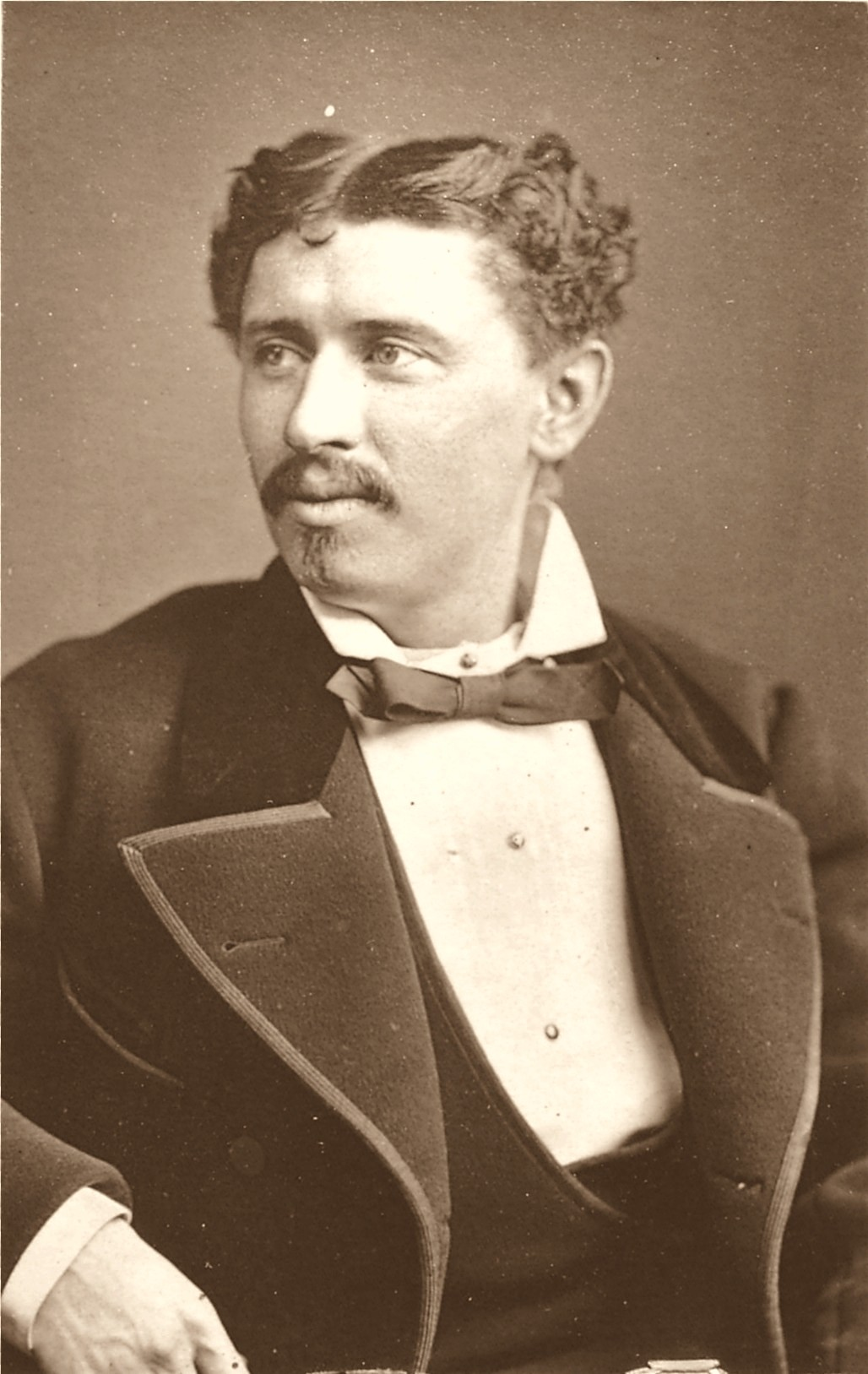
Frederick Mortimer Vokes

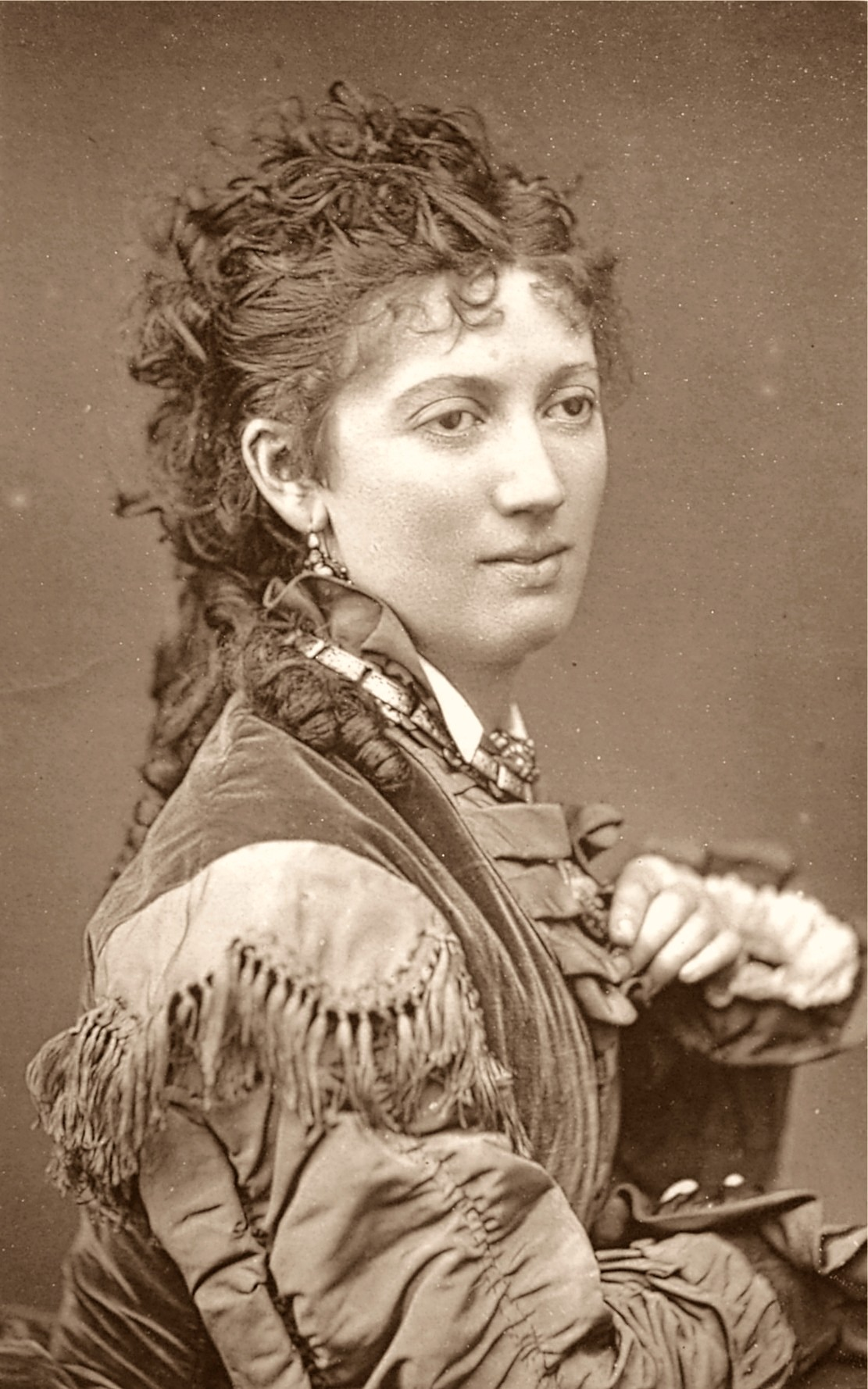
Jessie Vokes

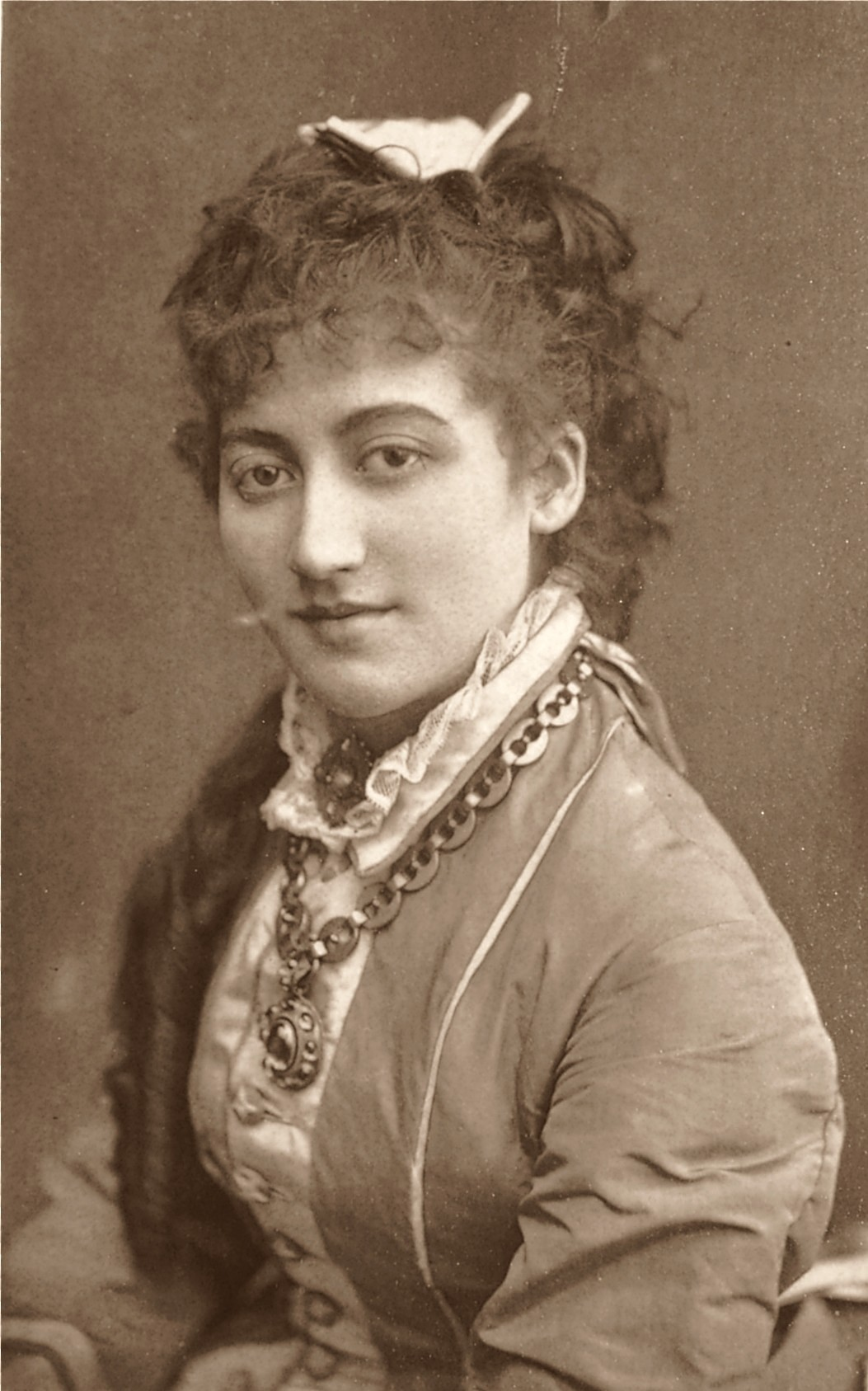
Victoria Vokes

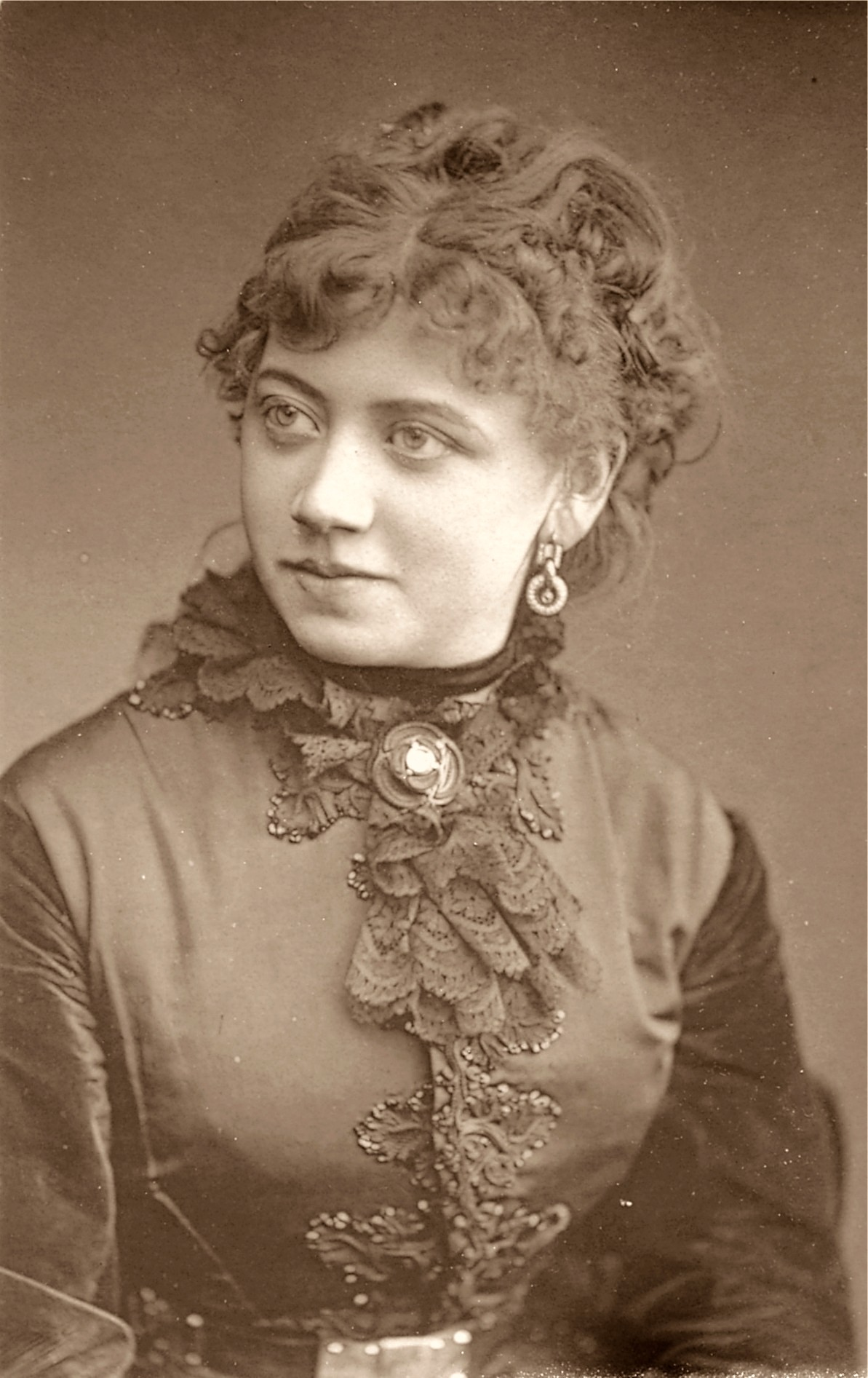
Rosina Vokes

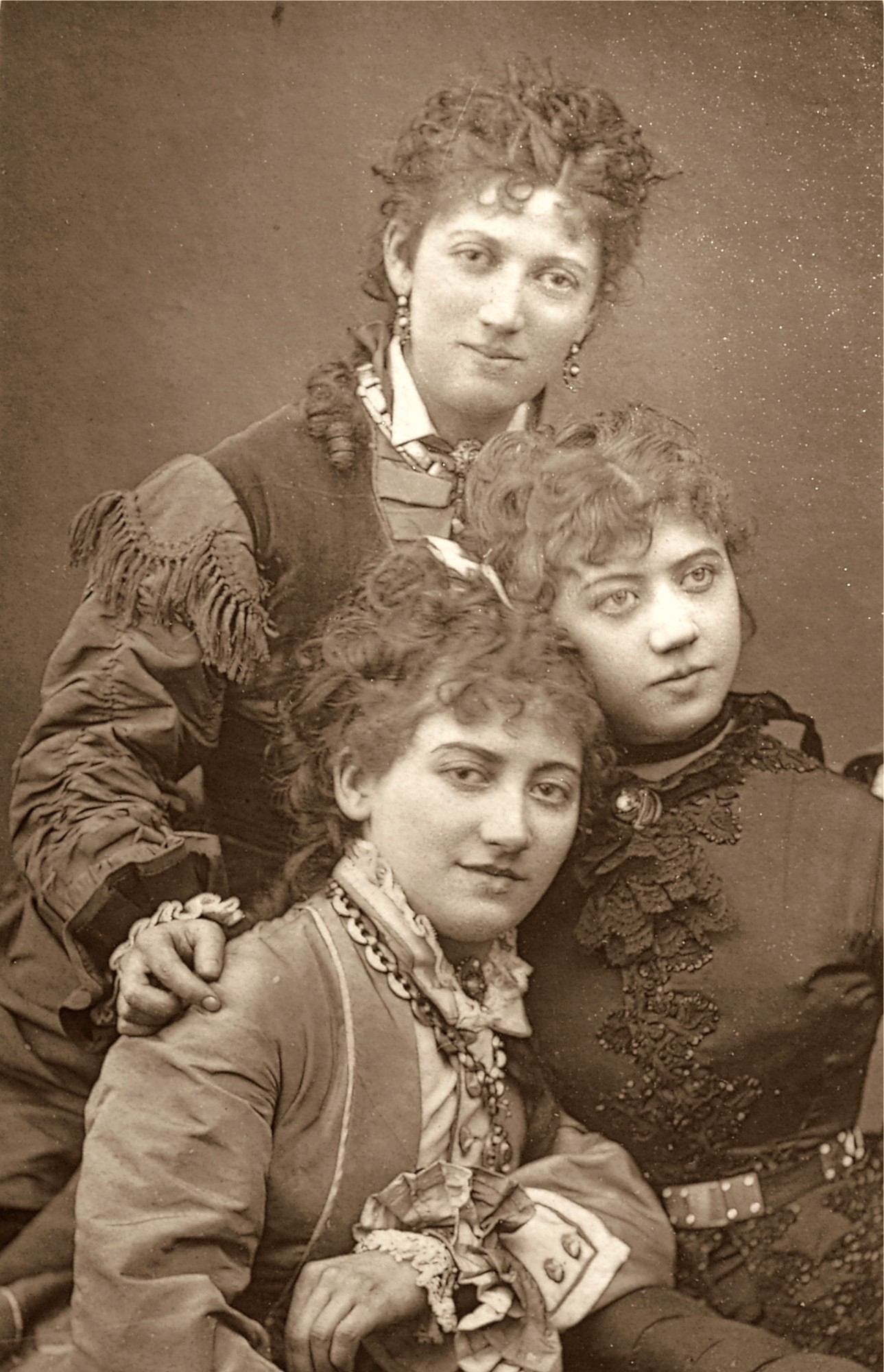
Jessie, Rosina and Victoria Vokes

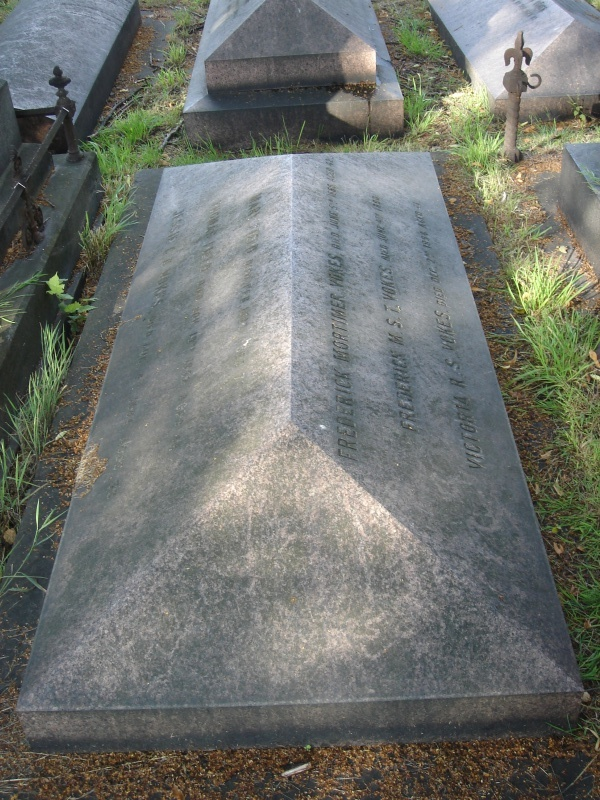
Funerary monument, Brompton Cemetery, London
