= Voke =

Voke may refer to:

- Vokė, a river in Lithuania
- Edward J. Voke (1889-1965), Mayor of Chelsea, Massachusetts, USA
- Voke, a nicotine inhaler developed by Kind Consumer

== See also ==
- E'voke, British vocal duo
- Vokes (disambiguation)
