= The Shaughraun =

1874 play written by Dion Boucicault

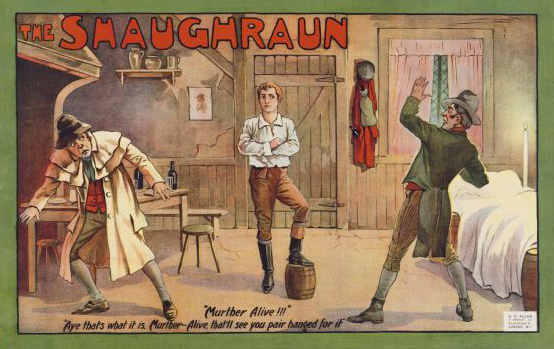
Color lithograph poster c. 1875.

The Shaughraun is a melodramatic play written by Irish playwright Dion Boucicault. It was first performed at Wallack's Theatre, New York, on 14 November 1874. Dion Boucicault played Conn in the original production. The play was a huge success, making half a million dollars for Boucicault.

== Plot ==
Robert Ffolliott, fiancé of Arte O'Neale, has returned to Ireland after escaping from transportation to Australia. He was in part sent as a result of Kinchela's desire for ownership of the O’Neale property. However, two things stand in Kinchela's way: a curse on the property that brings death to all inhabitants that are not a part of certain Irish gentry families (Arte O’Neale being from one of said families), and the engagement of Robert to Arte. Kinchela thus conspires with police informant Harvey Duff to have Robert arrested as a Fenian fugitive, and sent on a ship to Australia. However the true nature of Robert’s possible Fenian political status and theoretical involvement is left ambiguous throughout the play. Kinchela then defrauds Claire and Arte by lowering the rent of the properties surrounding theirs, deceitfully forcing them to have him purchase the property. Robert escapes due to Conn the Shaughraun (Irish seachránaí = wanderer, errant person, a roguish poacher who provides a great deal of comic relief) conning his way onto the ship. The two of them then con their way onto another ship heading back to Ireland and Robert is reunited with Arte at Father Dolan’s. Robert sees Duff’s face in the window and begins to panic, but Duff flees before the others can see him as well. Molineaux searches the house for Robert with great disdain, willing to call off the search if he receives the trustworthy word of a catholic priest (Father Dolan). Father Dolan struggles greatly, unable to lie, and Robert gives himself up so that the Father does not need to.

Kinchela receives a letter detailing the Queen's pardoning of the Fenians. Kinchela and Duff fear the freedom of Robert foiling their plans, so they plot to kill him by having Kinchela come to Robert as a 'friend' and convince him of an escape plan, ultimately having the police intercept and shoot him due to their current inclination to result to "extreme measures". Conn interferes with their plans, bursting Robert out of prison and playing the red herring so the henchmen shoot him dead. However, he is not actually dead, but uses the faking of his death and following wake to assist in catching the culprits. Meanwhile, Kinchela and Duff abduct Arte and Moya, planning to take them away with them.

Robert's sister, Claire Ffolliott, is in love with an English soldier, Captain Molineaux, who is tracking down Fenians in the area. She cannot decide whether or not to protect her brother or betray the Captain. She takes the side of her brother, fooling Molineaux and leading him away, but cannot go through with it and comes clean to him.

The wake is held for Conn, allowing him to eavesdrop on the henchmen and discover Arte and Moya's location. Molineaux, having received news of the pardon, joins Conn to catch the culprits. Meanwhile, Arte and Moya overthrow Duff and Kinchela, and all ends well. The Fenians receive a general amnesty, the couples marry, Kinchela is arrested, and Harvey Duff falls off a cliff.

== Characters ==
- Arte O'Neale (Robert’s fiancé, Irish gentry)
- Robert Ffolliott (Arte’s fiancé, under sentence as a Fenian, Irish gentry)
- Captain Molineux (English Officer)
- Claire Ffolliott (Robert's sister, Irish gentry)
- Father Dolan (Robert’s Guardian, parish priest of Suilabeg,)
- Conn (the shaughraun)
- Corry Kinchela (a self-made squireen)
- Harvey Duff (a police informant)
- Sergeant Jones (Sergeant in English Detachment)
- Mrs. O'Kelly (Conn's Mother)
- Moya (Father Dolan's niece)

== In popular culture ==
The Shaughraun was met with great success upon its first production in New York (1874). Understandably so as the play possesses a sort of Fenian hero, and the United States is credited as the country where the Fenian movement was first initiated. It was met with equal success in its London production (1875) at the Theatre Royal, Drury Lane in a production staged by F. B. Chatterton.

The play is attended by the protagonist, Newland Archer, in Edith Wharton's novel The Age of Innocence which is set in 1870s New York.
