= F. B. Chatterton =

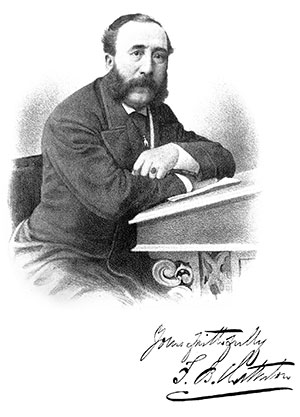
Frederick Balsir Chatterton

Frederick Balsir Chatterton, known as F. B. Chatterton (17 September 1834– 18 February 1886) was a 19th-century British theatre manager and impresario who was lessee of the Theatre Royal in London's Drury Lane from 1866 to 1879. He is credited with originating the famous quote, "Shakespeare spelt ruin and Byron bankruptcy".

== Early life ==
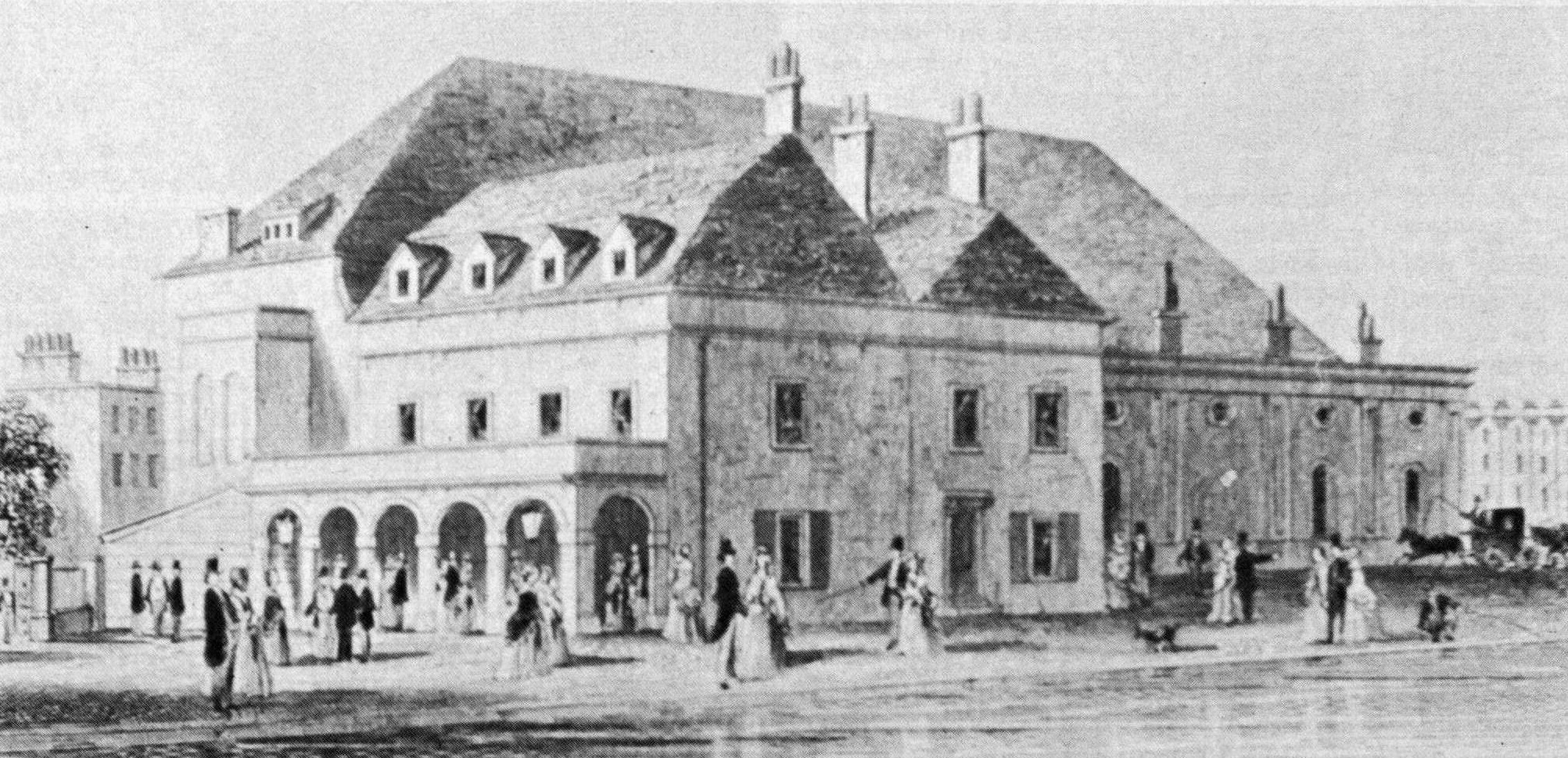
Sadler's Wells Theatre in 1879

He was born in London in 1834, the son of Edward Andrew Chatterton (c1809–1875), and his wife Amelia née Field (c1810–1886). He came from a musical family: his grandfather John Chatterton was 'professor of music' at Portsmouth and who with his wife Mary née Callow had eight sons and three daughters. Earlier in life John Chatterton had inherited and spent a large fortune and not wanting the same thing to happen to his sons decided that at least three of them should become successful harpists. Two, the oldest and youngest - John Balsir Chatterton and Frederick Chatterton, followed their father's wishes. However, Edward Andrew Chatterton, the second son and Frederick Balsir Chatterton's father, did not wish to follow his father's plan and instead became, at various times, a music publisher, a seller of musical instruments and a box book-keeper at Sadler's Wells Theatre. Edward Chatterton wished for a better career for his own son and wanted him to follow the family tradition of harp-playing, but as a young boy growing up and having the run of the Wells, Frederick Balsir Chatterton decided that the stage was the only career for him and persuaded the theatre's manager to give him a small role in a pantomime. This did not go down too well with his uncles who demanded that his father persuade Frederick to withdraw from the production before he dishonoured the family name. On leaving the show he was tutored by William Aspull with the intention of becoming a professor of music. It was as such that he was described when on 13 October 1853 he married Mary Ann née Williams (c1830–1909), the daughter of Samuel Williams, a dairyman, at St. George's church in Bloomsbury and with whom he had at least two daughters and a son.

== Theatre management ==
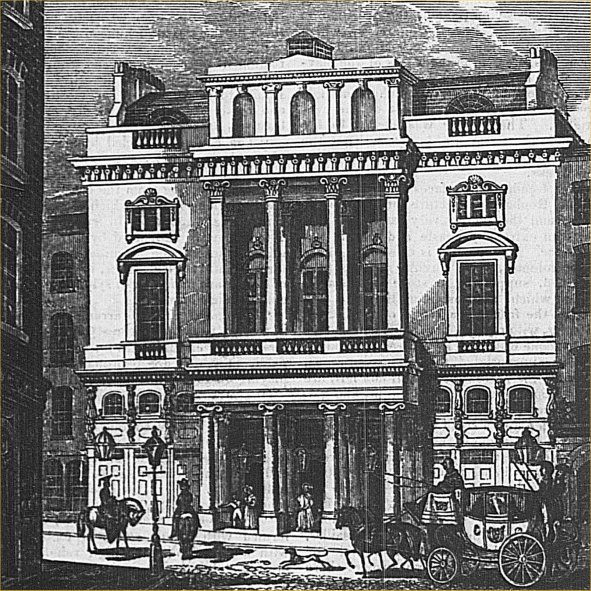
Façade of St James's Theatre in 1836. Chatterton was manager here from 1859 to 1860

However, the pull of theatre management proved too strong, and Frederick Chatterton helped his father run the box office at the Marylebone Theatre before being employed for similar duties at Drury Lane for the 1855–6 season, being appointed acting manager at the Lyceum Theatre by Charles Dillon in London in 1857, but when Dillon's management of the theatre failed Chatterton joined with the Irish actor and playwright Edmund Falconer to run the Lyceum in partnership. During the 1859–60 season Chatterton managed the St James's Theatre making him at 25 the youngest lessee in London. Here he presented a season, mainly of Shakespeare, by the popular actor Barry Sullivan, and staged F. C. Burnand's first major play, a burlesque called Dido, which ran for 80 performances. Frederick Chatterton then took over the management of the Theatre Royal in Rochester in Kent for the 1860–61 season but this was a financial disaster and leaving his with so little money that in January 1861 he had to walk back to London. Later in 1861 he rejoined Falconer at the Lyceum, whose 1861 play Peep O'Day played at the theatre from November 1861 to December 1862 - the longest run known in London up to that time. Despite this success in 1863 the owner of the Lyceum gave the lease to the French actor Charles Fechter and dispensed with the services of Falconer and Chatterton.

== Success at Drury Lane ==
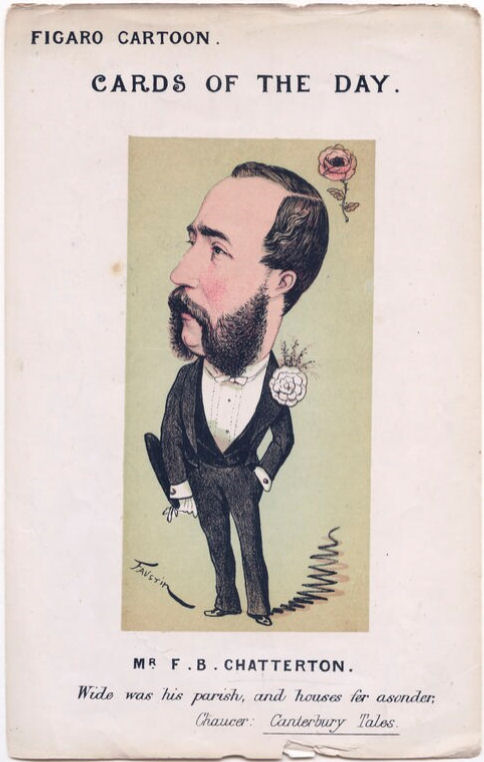
Chatterton as depicted in Figaro (c1870)

In 1862 Falconer was granted the lease of the Theatre Royal, Drury Lane, and owing Chatterton £2,866 in profits from Peep O'Day, in return for allowing the debt to be carried over he appointed Chatterton as acting manager at Drury Lane while Falconer continued as sole lessee and manager. Their joint management opened on Boxing Day 1862 with the pantomime Little Goody Two-Shoes, after which they produced Falconer's play Bonnie Dundee, which proved a financial disaster. Other plays by Falconer were also mounted which also failed and the two faced bankruptcy. Chatterton was forced to stop Falconer putting on any more of his own plays, later writing, 'I insisted upon our reverting at once to the legitimate and classic drama'. Chatterton hired the Shakespearian actor Samuel Phelps as leading actor and director of productions at Drury Lane. In October 1863 Phelps opened in an adaptation of Byron's Manfred, which ran for nearly 100 performances. Chatterton added:

I was now able to realise the dream of my life — to restore Old Drury to its position as the home of the poetic drama, from which it had been deposed by E. T. Smith.

In March 1864 Phelps appeared as Falstaff Henry IV, Part 1, Chatterton's first Shakespearian production. It has been claimed that Chatterton hired Phelps for a weekly salary of £80, a figure which does not match Chatterton's comment that Phelps was "the greatest and cheapest feature we ever had." Edward Stirling states that Phelps received £80 and at other times £100 a week, but it is unclear if he did so throughout his entire run.

By this time Chatterton was managing the Theatre Royal single-handed, his partner Falconer never having had any sense of business and who was also drinking heavily. In March 1864 the two became joint lessees with an equal share of the profits. In 1866 the partners had a disagreement, following which Falconer was declared bankrupt and Chatterton took over as sole lessee, opening on 23 September 1866 with Samuel Phelps in King John. However, putting on Shakespeare plays did not show a profit so at the end of the 1866–7 season Chatterton put on The Great City, a melodrama about life in contemporary London by Andrew Halliday which ran for 102 performances.

For the 1868 season at Drury Lane Chatterton desired to return to legitimate theatre and the works of Shakespeare, but such works not proving profitable Halliday persuaded him to strike a balance 'between pure legitimacy and thoroughbred sensationalism' by producing extravagant stage versions of the works of Sir Walter Scott adapted by Halliday. The first was The Fortunes of Nigel, produced on-stage as King of Scots and which opened on 27 September 1868 with Samuel Phelps as James I. Proving a financial success, it was followed by further Halliday adaptations of Scott including Amy Robsart (1870 based on Kenilworth; and Rebecca (1871) adapted from Ivanhoe, all of which proved popular with audiences. In August 1869 Chatterton produced the melodrama Formosa by Dion Boucicault. Including a scene of the Oxford and Cambridge boat race onstage it ran for 117 performances. However, although successful the play proved controversial, mainly because one of the female characters was said to have been based on an actual London prostitute. Boucicault kept publicity going for the play by writing pseudonymous letters to the newspapers criticising his own play. Responding to the criticism in a letter published in The Times - ostensibly written by Chatterton but actually written by Boucicault - 'Chatterton' pointed out that in his experience of running the Theatre Royal, "Shakespeare spelt ruin and Byron bankruptcy". This generated fresh publicity that Chatterton was not fit to be managing what was widely regarded as Britain's national theatre.

All his ventures so far proving successful, Chatterton took over the leases for the Princess's Theatre and the Adelphi Theatre; he knew both theatres were running at a loss but did not realise the true extent of these until later, and was forced to use the profits from Drury Lane to cover the losses at the other two theatres until he was able to sell the leases on. From 1870 to 1873 Chatterton produced no Shakespearian productions at Drury Lane, but the 1873–4 season opened with a spectacular production of Antony and Cleopatra in which Cleopatra sailed on her barge down the Nile (not the Cydnus) and the Battle of Actium was fought between galleys on a canvas sea. However, Halliday reduced the play from thirty-four scenes to twelve thus leaving out numerous characters and various plotlines which angered fans of Shakespeare and causing the production to lose between £4,000 and £5,000.

Chatterton opened the 1875–6 season with the first British production of Boucicault's The Shaughraun which ran at Drury Lane from September to 18 December when it transferred to the Adelphi Theatre to make way for the pantomime Dick Whittington starring the Vokes Family. Running concurrently were Chatterton's productions of Rip Van Winkle at the Princess's Theatre and Notre Dame at the Adelphi Theatre (which was taken off to make way for The Shaughraun). All three shows were a success and Chatterton said he had made £20,000 in profit from them.

== Failure ==
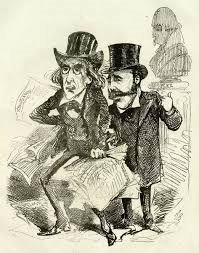
Cartoon of Henry Irving and Chatterton (1884) in which Chatterton warns Irving of the dangers of putting on the works of Shakespeare: "Don't spend too much time and money on that ungrateful old man. Look how he served me!"

Chatterton continued with his determination to put on productions of Shakespeare at Drury Lane and his Richard III in 1876 made a loss of £6,000. In 1878 he obtained a further five-year lease on Drury Lane (his 13th year as sole lessee) and declared that his 1878–79 season would include more Shakespeare. His lavish production of The Winter's Tale failed critically and financially and ran for just 33 performances. Next he produced Macbeth, Othello, Cymbeline, The Merchant of Venice and Hamlet - each with a run of just a few nights. By December 1878 when his pantomime Cinderella opened his losses for the season were already running at £7,000. Chatterton always relied on the success of the pantomime to make up for any financial shortfall from the Autumn season, but Cinderella too failed and by February 1879 Chatterton found he could not pay the company's wages. All were asked to accept half-pay for a period and everyone agreed with the exception of the Vokes Family around whom the pantomime centred and who had played the leading parts in Drury Lane pantomimes for a decade. The Vokes family proved to not be the draw they had once been as they had never updated their routines while the critics were not kind concerning their contribution to Cinderella, making such comments as: "They were on stage far too long", "They are sublimely indifferent as to whether the story of Cinderella be a Sanskrit myth or a Greek fable", "If they want to retain their hold on the public, they should get someone to concoct for them new modes". They refused to perform for less and without them the show could not go on and on 4 February 1879 Chatterton closed the theatre. He petitioned for bankruptcy with assets of £1,500 but with liabilities of £38,690.

== Last years ==
For the rest of his life Chatterton lived in increasing financial difficulty and frequently relied on the charity of members of the theatrical community. For the 1879–80 season the Gatti Brothers made him manager of the Theatre Royal in Covent Garden but heavy snowstorms kept audiences away and the pantomime failed. Chatterton then argued with the Gattis over the terms of his benefit and left Covent Garden. He became manager of Sadler's Wells Theatre but here too his management failed. For a period he was reduced to teaching elocution and acting and gave public readings of the works of Charles Dickens, but largely he relied on benefit performances for financial support.

Frederick Balsir Chatterton died of bronchitis and of 'carcinoma of glands in neck causing laryngeal obstruction' at Alpha House, Lansdowne Road in Dalston in London in February 1886 aged 51 and was buried the same month in Brompton Cemetery.

His biography Shakespeare Spelt Ruin: The Life of Frederick Balsir Chatterton, Drury Lane's Last Bankrupt by Robert Whelan was published in 2019.
