= Strolling players =

Travelling theatrical groups popular until the 16th century

Strolling players were travelling theatre groups in England during the Tudor and earlier periods. They toured the country delivering theatrical performances, performing in barns and in the courtyards of inns. One of the most popular subjects for plays performed by these strolling players was Robin Hood.

The English government of the period was concerned that play subjects such as Robin Hood would promote rebellious acts. Bubonic plague and other epidemics also led to fear that the strolling players would spread disease. Strolling players were banned in 1572, and the only actors allowed to perform around the country were those who were employed by noblemen.
