= List of ambassadors of the United Kingdom to Uruguay =

The ambassador of the United Kingdom to Uruguay is head of the UK's diplomatic mission to Uruguay. The official title is His Britannic Majesty's Ambassador to the Oriental Republic of Uruguay.

== History ==
Geoffrey Jackson, the British ambassador to Uruguay, was kidnapped in January 1971. He spent eight months in captivity before being released for a ransom in September 1971.

== List of heads of mission ==
=== Early diplomats ===
- 1824–1839: Thomas Samuel Hood
- 1846–1847: Adolphus Turner Chargé d'Affaires
  - 1848: William Gore Ouseley Special Mission
- 1847–1851: Captain Robert Gore Chargé d'Affaires, buried at The British Cemetery, Montevideo
- 1851–1853: Hon. Frederick Bruce Chargé d'Affaires
- 1853–1854: George John Robert Gordon Chargé d'Affaires and Consul-General
- Unknown: Theodore Lemm, buried at The British Cemetery, Montevideo
- 1871: Major James St. John Munro consul, buried at The British Cemetery, Montevideo
- 1879: Sir Clare Ford Minister Plenipotentiary and Consul-General

=== Ministers resident and consuls-general ===
- 1879–1884: Hon. Edmund Monson
- 1884–1888: William Palgrave
- 1888–1893: Ernest Satow
- 1893–1906: Walter Baring
- 1906–1912: Robert Kennedy

=== Envoys extraordinary and ministers plenipotentiary ===
- 1913–1919: Alfred Mitchell-Innes
- 1919–1925: Sir Claude Mallet
- 1925–1930: Ernest Scott
- 1930–1933: Robert Michell
- 1933–1941: Eugen Millington-Drake
- 1941–1943: Ralph Stevenson
- 1943: Gordon Vereker

=== Ambassadors extraordinary and plenipotentiary ===
- 1944–1949: Sir Gordon Vereker
- 1949–1953: Sir Douglas Howard
- 1953–1955: Eric Lingeman
- 1955–1957: Sir Keith Jopson
- 1957–1961: Sir Malcolm Henderson
- 1961–1966: Norman Brain
- 1966–1969: Sir Keith Unwin
- 1969–1972: Geoffrey Jackson kidnapped 1971
- 1971–1972: James Hennessy (Consul) chargé d'affaires
- 1972–1977: Peter Oliver
- 1977–1980: William Peters
- 1980–1983: Patricia Hutchinson
- 1983–1986: Charles Wallace
- 1986–1989: Eric Vines
- 1989–1991: Colum John Sharkey
- 1991–1994: Donald Lamont
- 1995–1998: Robert Hendrie
- 1998–2001: Andrew Murray
- 2001–2005: John Everard
- 2005–2008: Hugh Salvesen
- 2008–2012: Patrick Mullee
- 2012–2016: Ben Lyster-Binns
- 2016–2020: Ian Duddy
- 2020–2024: Faye O'Connor
- 2024–present: Mal Green
