= Embassy of the United Kingdom, Montevideo =

- Location: Montevideo, Uruguay
- Address: Marco Bruto 1073
- Coordinates: 34°54′30″S 56°8′16″W
- Website: British Embassy, Montevideo

The Embassy of the United Kingdom in Montevideo is the chief diplomatic mission of the United Kingdom in Uruguay. It is currently located at Marco Bruto 1073 in the coastal Pocitos barrio. From 1927 until the 1970s, the embassy (until 1944, a legation) was located in a custom-built villa in the Parque Batlle barrio; this is now used as the ambassador's residence.

== Dipomatic history ==
The UK had played a key role in negotiating with Argentina and Brazil for the establishment of Uruguay as an independent state following the Cisplatine War of 1825 to 1828. Britain played a key role in the trade, finance and infrastructure sectors of 19th century Uruguay. The British diplomatic office was rated as a legation, headed by a minister, until 1944 when it was promoted to an embassy. The British minister in Montevideo, Eugen Millington-Drake, convinced the Uruguayan government in December 1939 to refuse permission for the German cruiser Admiral Graf Spee to remain in port for more than 72 hours after it had been damaged in action with British vessels at the Battle of the River Plate. The Graf Spee was forced to leave the port and was scuttled by her captain. Millington-Drake has a street named after him in Montevideo. In 1971 the British ambassador, Geoffrey Jackson, was kidnapped from his car by the Tupamaros guerrilla group and held for ransom for the better part of a year before being released.

== Residence ==
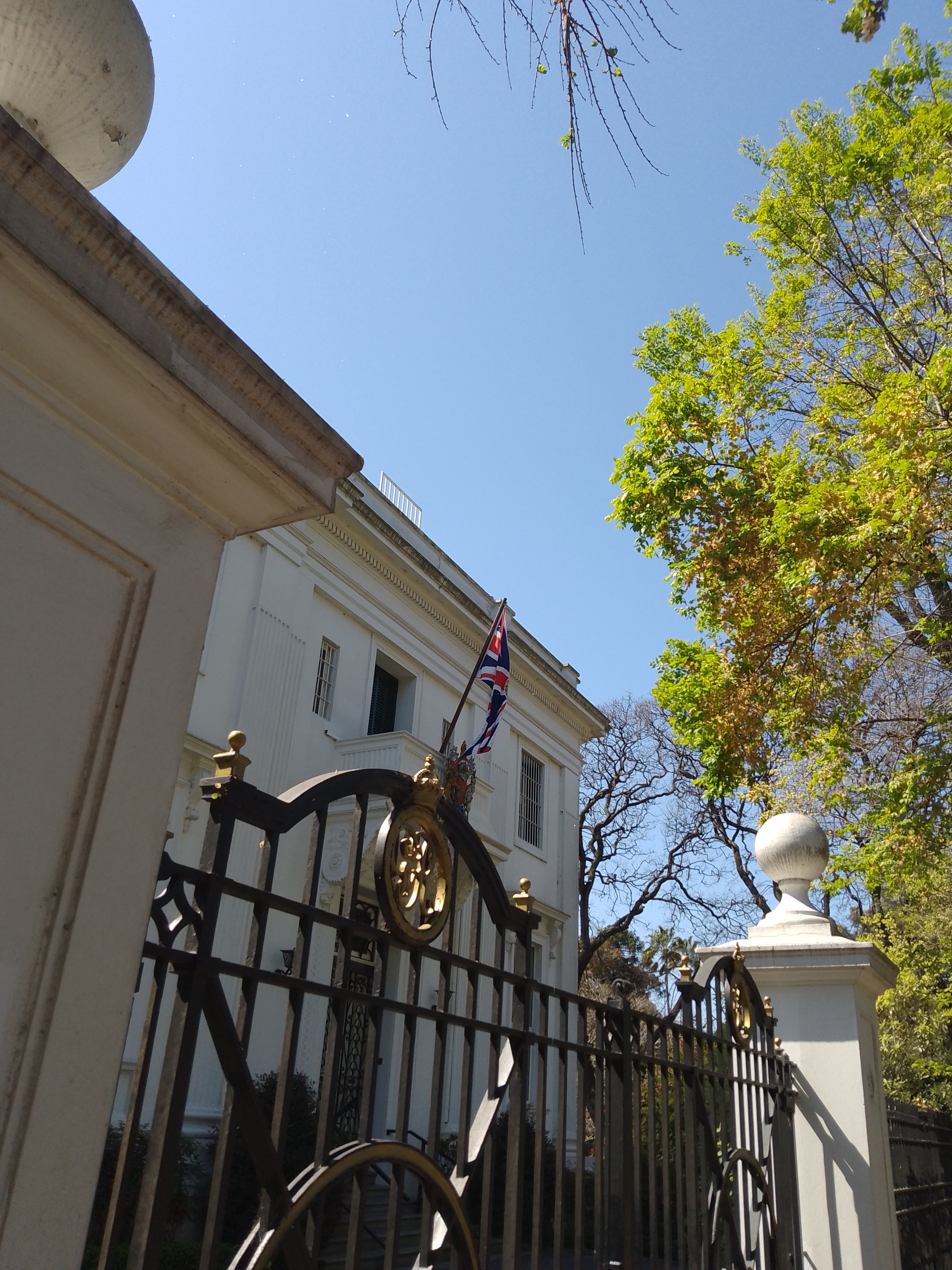
The embassy's residence

The embassy's residence is located in Parque Batlle at Jorge Canning 2491, named after George Canning, British prime minister in 1827 who had supported Uruguayan independence. The site formerly served as the embassy. The site had been selected by Cecil Simpson, an architect with the Office of Works, in 1923. Simpson had arrived in Montevideo to arrange purchase of a mansion for use as a legation in the country but had not found one suitable so proposed the purchase of land and the construction of a new building.

Simpson found a collection of seven adjoining plots that he considered suitable, totalling 3,400 square metres (37,000 sq ft) and received approval to purchase them. One owner refused to sell but the remaining six plots, totalling 2,850 square metres (30,700 sq ft), were in British hands by the end of 1923, at a cost of around £9,000.

Simpson asked Montevideo-based British firm Adams Broad and Company to act as local architects for the Office of Works, that would design the legation. He left them a list of rooms of specified sizes that the Office of Works would include in their design. The Office of Works design was to be carried out by Richard Allison and junior colleagues F. L. W. Cloux and Thrift Reavell. Rather than waiting for the design to arrive from London, Adams Broad seized the initiative and prepared their own design which they sent to the Office of Works. This was around 25% larger in floorplan than Simpson had specified and the Office of Works, which disagreed with the increased size, amended the design. The Office of Works' design changes were opposed by the British minister in Montevideo, Claude Mallet, who complained that reductions in room sizes would have adverse effects on the use of the building for dances; he received some support in this from the Secretary of the Office of Works Lionel Earle.

Another complication to the design was the question of whether a porte-cochère was necessary to provide protection from rain for those disembarking carriages or cars at the main entrance. This would have added £300-400 to the construction cost. Simpson had specified a porte-cochère in his original report but Allison was opposed, noting that a balcony over the entrance provided some protection. Earle and the First Commissioner of Works, Viscount Peel, also opposed the inclusion of a porte-cochère. The Chief Clerk of the Foreign Office Hubert Montgomery and the new minister in Montevideo Ernest Scott were keen advocates for inclusion. Scott had refused to host Edward, Prince of Wales in the existing legation buildings during a 1925 visit as he considered them insufficient. The matter reached George V who, in October, asked the Foreign Secretary to look into the matter "in the hope that fitting accommodation for his Majesty's representative may be secured".

The final design of the legation was completed before the end of 1925; it included a larger drawing room and hall to accommodate dances but omitted the porte-cochère. Allison noted that "The aim in designing our new Legation has been to obtain dignity with a certain degree of richness particularly in the detail of the pilasters but avoiding the over-elaboration of the more important local buildings".

The neo-classical villa, clad in white stucco, was operational by 7 December 1927. It cost around £34,500 to build, in excess of the original estimate of £33,000. The legation was inaugurated on George V's Official Birthday, 4 June 1928. Viscount Davison visited the legation in 1943 and recommended the purchase of a vacant adjacent plot measuring 1 acre (4,000 m^{2}; 44,000 sq ft) to prevent it from being built on. This was carried out in 1946 at a cost of £21,000 and used to extend the embassy garden. The gardens are now extensive and they, and a terrace adjacent to the residence, are used to hold drinks receptions. The residence holds a painting of the city by Uruguayan artist Juan Manuel Besnes e Irigoyen. The building survived a 1977 Foreign Office proposal for its sale and replacement by a more "commercial and functional" structure, perhaps built in the gardens.

== Embassy ==
The legation proved too far from the city centre for many of the consular services it provided and office space was leased in a more central location to provide these, initially at Calle Treinta y Tres 1282. A second office was in use by 1943. These were combined in 1964, with the purchase of a 7th floor suite at the Bank of London and South America building. A new site at Marco Bruto 1073, in the Pocitos barrio, was purchased in the early 1970s and this has been designated as the formal embassy since at at least 1976. The current ambassador is Mal Green, appointed in 2024.

The embassy also represents the British Overseas Territories in Argentina. The 2022 appearance of representatives from the Falklands Islands at an agricultural and industrial fair in Montevideo drew a complaint to the embassy from the Argentine embassy in Montevideo due to Argentina's claim of sovereignty over the British territory. The British embassy's annual invitation for Uruguayan politicians of all parties to visit the Falkland Islands was turned down by the opposition Broad Front in 2023.
