= Keith Jopson =

British diplomat (1898–1957)

Sir Reginald Keith Jopson KCMG OBE

British Ambassador to Uruguay
- In office 1955–1957
- Preceded by: Eric Lingeman
- Succeeded by: Malcolm Henderson

British Ambassador to Colombia
- In office 1953–1955
- Preceded by: Gilbert MacKereth
- Succeeded by: James Joint

Personal details
- Born: 25 October 1898
- Died: 27 May 1957 (aged 58) Montevideo
- Children: 2
- Education: University College London, London School of Economics
- Occupation: Diplomat

Sir Reginald Keith Jopson (25 October 1898 – 27 May 1957) was a British diplomat who served as Ambassador to Colombia from 1953 to 1955 and Ambassador to Uruguay from 1955 to 1957.

== Early life and education ==
Jopson was born on 25 October 1898, the son of William Knowles Jopson and Ellen Butters. He was educated privately and at University College London and London School of Economics.

== Career ==
After serving during World War I as a Lieutenant with the London Rifle Brigade, Jopson entered the Foreign Service in 1920. He served as Vice-Consul successively in Chicago (1920–1923); Colon and Panama City (1923–1926), and Cologne (1926–1929). He was Second Secretary and Vice-Consul at Montevideo (1929–30) and acted as Charge d'Affaires, Montevideo (1930). Then he was Commercial Secretary in Buenos Aires (1930–1933), and in Helsingfors (1933–1938). From 1939 to 1940 he was Director of the Foreign Division at the Department of Overseas Trade and was seconded to serve as UK Trade Commissioner at Montreal, Canada. In 1940 he acted as representative of the Children's Overseas Reception Board. From 1948 to 1953 he served as UK Trade Commissioner in Canada and Economic Adviser to the UK High Commissioner at Ottawa.

Jopson served as Ambassador to Colombia from 1953 to 1955. He was instrumental in the founding of the British School in Bogata. He served as Ambassador to Uruguay from 1955 to 1957. When he died in Montevideo while in office, the Uruguayan Government at his funeral there gave him the honours due to a Minister of State.

== Personal life and death ==
Jopson married Frances Barlow in 1922 and they had a son and a daughter. After the marriage was dissolved, he married Barbara Ransom in 1945.

Jopson died on 27 May 1957 at Montevideo, aged 58.

== Publications ==
- Canada: Economic and Commercial Conditions in Canada, 1947.

== Honours ==
Jopson was appointed Member of the Order of the British Empire (MBE) in the 1929 Birthday Honours, promoted to Officer of the Order of the British Empire (OBE) in the 1937 Coronation Honours.

Jopson was appointed Companion of the Order of St Michael and St George (CMG) in the 1949 Birthday Honours, promoted to Knight Commander (KCMG) in the 1955 New Year Honours.

== See also ==
- Colombia–United Kingdom relations
- United Kingdom–Uruguay relations

Diplomatic posts
Preceded by Gilbert MacKereth	British Ambassador to Colombia; 1953–1955	Succeeded by James Joint
Preceded by Eric Lingeman	British Ambassador to Uruguay; 1955–1957	Succeeded by Malcolm Henderson
