= Chatterton (surname) =

Chatterton is a surname. Notable people include:

- Sir Alfred Chatterton (1866–1958), British pioneer of industry in India
- Anna Chatterton, Canadian playwright
- F. B. Chatterton (1834–1886), British theatre manager
- Fenimore Chatterton (1860–1958), American businessman
- Frederick Chatterton (1814–1894), English harpist
- Georgiana Chatterton (1806–1876), British traveller and author
- John Chatterton, wreck diver
- John Balsir Chatterton, English harpist
- Ruth Chatterton (1892–1961), American actress
- Thomas Chatterton (1752–1770), English poet and forger
- Tom Chatterton (1881–1952), American actor
- William Chatterton (1861–1913), English cricketer
