= Keith Unwin =

British diplomat (1909–1990)

Sir Keith Unwin KBE CMG

British Ambassador to Uruguay
- In office 1966–1969
- Preceded by: Sir Norman Brain
- Succeeded by: Sir Geoffrey Jackson

Personal details
- Born: 3 August 1909
- Died: 18 March 1990 (aged 80)
- Children: 3
- Education: St John's College, Oxford
- Occupation: Diplomat

Sir Keith Unwin (3 August 1909 – 18 March 1990) was a British diplomat who served as ambassador to Uruguay from 1966 to 1969.

== Early life and education ==
Unwin was born on 3 August 1909, the son of Edwin Ernest Unwin and Jessie Magdalen Black. He was educated at Merchant Taylors' School, the Lycée Condorcet, Paris, and St John's College, Oxford, where graduated in 1931.

== Career ==
Unwin began his career as an intelligence officer cadet at the Department of Overseas Trade in 1932 before joining the Diplomatic Service. In 1934, he was sent to Madrid which was followed by postings to Istanbul in 1937; to San Sebastian and Madrid as commercial secretary in 1939; to Mexico City in 1944; to Paris as first secretary (commercial) in 1946; to Prague in 1949; and to Buenos Aires in 1950 as commercial councillor.

After spending three years in Argentina, Unwin was posted to Rome where he served as minister (commercial) from 1955 to 1959 and chargé d'affaires in 1956. He was then transferred to the Foreign Office as a foreign service inspector, a post he held from 1959 until 1962 when he was appointed the UK representative on the United Nations Economic and Social Council, remaining in the position until 1966. In 1966, he was appointed ambassador to Uruguay, a post he held until 1969.

== Personal life and death ==
Unwin married Linda Giersé in 1935 and they had a son and two daughters.

Unwin died on 18 March 1990, aged 80.

== Honours ==
Unwin was appointed Companion of the Order of St Michael and St George (CMG) in the 1954 Birthday Honours. He was appointed Officer of the Order of the British Empire (OBE) in the 1937, and promoted to Knight Commander of the Order of the British Empire (KBE) in the 1964 Birthday Honours.

== See also ==
- Uruguay–United Kingdom relations

Diplomatic posts
Preceded by Sir Norman Brain	British Ambassador to Uruguay; 1966–1969	Succeeded by Sir Geoffrey Jackson
