= Walter Baring =

Walter Baring may refer to:

- Walter Baring (diplomat) (1844–1915), English diplomat who served as Minister Resident and Consul-General to Uruguay
- Walter S. Baring Jr. (1911–1975), American politician who served as U.S. Representative from Nevada
