= Department of Overseas Trade =

Department of Overseas Trade may refer to:

- Department of Overseas Trade (Australia), a government department that existed from 1972 to 1977
- Department of Overseas Trade (United Kingdom), a government department that existed from 1918 to 1946
