= Norman Brain =

British diplomat (1907–2002)

Sir Norman Brain KBE CMG

British Ambassador to Uruguay
- In office 1961–1966
- Preceded by: Sir Malcolm Henderson
- Succeeded by: Sir Keith Unwin

British Ambassador to Cambodia
- In office 1956–1958
- Preceded by: Richard Heppel
- Succeeded by: Frederic Garner

Personal details
- Born: 19 July 1907
- Died: 27 December 2002 (aged 95)
- Children: 2
- Education: Queen’s College, Oxford
- Occupation: Diplomat

Sir Henry Norman Brain ( 19 July 1907– 27 December 2002) was a British diplomat who served as ambassador to Cambodia from 1956 to 1958 and ambassador to Uruguay from 1961 to 1966.

== Early life and education ==
Brain was born on 19 July 1907, the son of B. Brain of Rushall, Staffordshire. He was educated at King Edward’s School, Birmingham, and The Queen’s College, Oxford.

== Career ==
Brain joined the Japan Consular Service in 1930 as a student interpreter. In 1933, he was appointed acting vice-consul at Kobe and in 1935 acting consul and acting consul-general at Osaka. He was then acting consul at Tamsui from 1936 to 1937 before he was transferred to the commercial secretariat at Tokyo.

In 1937, he was sent to Manila but later that year was transferred to China as acting consul at Mukden and then to Shanghai with the acting rank of consul before he was promoted to consul at Mukden in 1938. He was transferred back to Tokyo in 1939, and was acting consul at Dairen in 1941 when war broke out. He was interned by the Japanese authorities before he was repatriated to Britain in an exchange of diplomatic staff and was employed as consul at the Foreign Office.

In 1944, Brain was appointed deputy to the chief political adviser to the South East Asia Supreme Allied Command, and served as political adviser to the Saigon Control Commission in 1945, before he resumed duty with South East Asia Supreme Allied Command at Singapore. He joined the staff of the Special Commissioner for South East Asia in Singapore in 1946.

Brain was then transferred to the Foreign Office in 1948. During the following year, he was promoted to counsellor and appointed head of the services liaison department following which he was appointed head of the permanent under-secretary’s department in 1949. In 1950, he was appointed an inspector of foreign service establishments. He was then posted to Tokyo as minister in 1953, and acted as chargé d’affaires there in 1953, 1954 and 1955. He served as Ambassador Extraordinary and Plenipotentiary at Phnom Penh, Cambodia, from 1956 to 1958 before he returned to the Foreign Office as assistant under secretary of state. His final posting was as Ambassador Extraordinary and Plenipotentiary at Montevideo, Uruguay, from 1961 to 1966 when he retired.

In retirement Brain maintained his interest in Asian affairs becoming chairman of the Royal Central Asian Society and chairman of the Council of the Japanese Society in London during the 1970s. He was also president of the British Uruguayan Society.

== Personal life and death ==
Brain married Nuala Mary Butterworth in 1939 and they had two sons.

Brain died on 27 December 2002, aged 95.

== Honours ==
Brain was appointed Officer of the Order of the British Empire (OBE) in the 1947 New Year Honours, and promoted to Knight Commander (KBE) in the 1963 New Year Honours. He was appointed Companion of the Order of St Michael and St George (CMG) in the 1953 Coronation Honours.

== See also ==
- Cambodia–United Kingdom relations
- Uruguay–United Kingdom relations

Diplomatic posts
Preceded by Richard Heppel	British Ambassador to Cambodia; 1956–1958	Succeeded by Frederic Garner
Preceded by Sir Malcolm Henderson	British Ambassador to Uruguay; 1961–1966	Succeeded by Sir Keith Unwin
