= Ernest Scott (diplomat) =

British diplomat (1872–1953)

Sir Ernest Scott KCMG MVO

British envoy extraordinary and minister plenipotentiary to Uruguay
- In office 1925–1930
- Preceded by: Sir Claude Mallet
- Succeeded by: Sir Robert Michell

Personal details
- Born: 1 November 1872
- Died: 6 November 1953 (aged 81) Isle of Purbeck
- Children: 1
- Occupation: Diplomat

Sir Ernest Stowell Scott (1 November 1872 – 6 November 1953) was a British diplomat who served as British envoy extraordinary and minister plenipotentiary to Uruguay from 1925 to 1930.

== Early life and education ==
Scott was born on 1 November 1872, the second son of the 3rd Earl of Eldon. He went to Winchester College in 1886, and then furthered his education abroad.

== Career ==
Scott entered the Foreign Office in 1895, and after passing the examination was posted as an attaché at Constantinople. He was promoted to third secretary in 1898, and then sent to Buenos Aires in 1901. After promotion to second secretary in 1901, he was appointed to serve in Madrid but the posting did not proceed, and he returned to work at the Foreign Office.

In 1905, he was secretary and then British government agent to the British delegation on the Newfoundland Claims Arbitration Tribunal established that year at Paris. Following the success of the arbitration, he was appointed MVO. He was then transferred to Vienna, and then to Canton as consul-general. In 1906, he was consul-general at Sofia and then at St Petersburg. After promotion to first secretary in 1908, he served at Montevideo in 1909, and in Washington in 1913. In 1912, he was first secretary at Peking, and in 1915 was transferred to Tehran where he served as counsellor and then minister. In 1920, he was appointed acting high commissioner at Cairo before he returned in 1924 to Rio de Janeiro. In 1925, he was appointed Envoy Extraordinary and Minister Plenipotentiary to Uraguay, and consul-general, at Montevideo, and remained in the post until 1930 when he retired.

== Personal life and death ==
Scott married Winifred Brodrick in 1941 and they had one daughter.

Scott died on 6 November 1953 on the Isle of Purbeck, Dorset, aged 81.

== Honours ==
Scott was appointed Companion of the Order of St Michael and St George (CMG) in the 1912 Birthday Honours, and promoted to Knight Commander (KCMG) in the 1931 New Year Honours. He was appointed Member of the Royal Victorian Order (MVO) in 1905.

== See also ==
- Uruguay–United Kingdom relations

Diplomatic posts
Preceded by Sir Claude Mallet	British envoy extraordinary and minister plenipotentiary to Uruguay; 1925–1930	Succeeded by Sir Robert Michell
