= 1912 Birthday Honours =

National awards given by King George V

The 1912 Birthday Honours were appointments in the British Empire of King George V to various orders and honours to reward and highlight good works by citizens. The appointments were made to celebrate the official birthday of The King, and were published on 11 June 1912.

The recipients of honours are displayed here as they were styled before their new honour, and arranged by honour, with classes (Knight, Knight Grand Cross, etc.) and then divisions (Military, Civil, etc.) as appropriate.

== British Empire ==
=== The Most Honourable Order of the Bath ===
==== Knight Grand Cross of the Order of the Bath (GCB) ====
Military Division

- General Sir George Digby Barker, KCB, Colonel, Seaforth Highlanders (Ross-shire Buffs, The Duke of Albany's).
- Lieutenant-General Sir Charles Tucker, GCVO KCB, Colonel, The South Staffordshire Regiment.

==== Knight Commander of the Order of the Bath (KCB) ====
Military Division

Royal Navy

- Vice-Admiral the Honourable Stanley Cecil James Colville, CVO CB.
- Lieutenant-General William Charles Nicholls, Royal Marine Artillery.

Army

- Lieutenant-General Sir James Bevan Edwards, KCMG CB, Colonel Commandant, Royal Engineers.
- Surgeon-Major-General Alexander Frederick Bradshaw, CB KHP, (Retd).
- Lieutenant-General Sir Edward Thomas Henry Hutton, KCMG CB, Colonel Commandant, The King's Royal Rifle Corps.
- Major-General Sir Ronald Bertram Lane, KCVO CB, (Retd).
- Major-General Robert Bellew Adams, VC CB, Indian Army (Retd).
- Major-General James Keith Trotter, CB CMG (Retd).
- Lieutenant-General Lawrence Worthington Parsons, CB.
- Lieutenant-General William Edmund Franklyn, CB, Colonel, Alexandra, Princess of Wales's Own (Yorkshire Regiment), Military Secretary to the Secretary of State for War, and Secretary of the Selection Board.
- Major-General Cecil Frederick Nevil Macready, CB, Director of Personal Services, War Office.

Civil Division

- Frederic George Kenyon, CB DLitt.
- William Gibbons, CB.
- Henry James Gibson, CB.

==== Companion of the Order of the Bath (CB) ====
Military Division

- Major-General George Frederick Gorringe, CMG DSO, Brigade Commander, Bombay Brigade.
- Surgeon-General William Babtie, VC CMG, Deputy Director-General, Army Medical Service.
- Colonel (temporary Brigadier-General) Lionel Herbert, CVO, Indian Army, Brigade Commander, Rangoon Brigade.
- Colonel (temporary Brigadier-General) Henry Peregrine Leader, Brigade Commander, Sialkot Brigade.
- Colonel Edward Hume Armitage, Colonel-in-charge of Records, Royal Horse and Royal Field Artillery.
- Colonel Herbert Edward Watts, Commanding No.9 District, Eastern Command.
- Colonel Gerald James Cuthbert, Commanding Scots Guards and Regimental District.
- Colonel Felix Frederic Hill, DSO, Commanding No.11 District, Irish Command.
- Colonel George Francis Milne, DSO, General Staff Officer, 1st grade, 6th Division, Irish Command.
- Colonel (temporary Brigadier-General) Hubert de la Poer Gough, Brigade Commander, 3rd Cavalry Brigade, Irish Command.
- Colonel Turville Douglas Foster, MVO, Assistant Quartermaster-General, Staff College.
- Colonel Colquhoun Grant Roche Thackwell, DSO, Indian Army.
- Colonel Francis Patrick Hutchinson, Indian Army.
- Colonel (temporary Brigadier-General) William Hugh Dobbie, Indian Army, Brigade Commander, Mandalay Brigade.
- Colonel (temporary Brigadier-General) Raleigh Gilbert Egerton, Indian Army, Brigade Commander, Ferozepore Brigade.
- Colonel (temporary Brigadier-General) Herbert Vaughan Cox, CSI, Indian Army, Brigade Commander, Rawalpindi Infantry Brigade.
- Colonel Arnold Henry Grant Kemball, Indian Army.
- Colonel Robert Maximilian Rainey-Robinson, Indian Army.
- Colonel Robert Neil Campbell, CIE, Indian Medical Service.

Civil Division

- Colonel Herman Le Roy-Lewis, DSO, Brigade Commander, 1st South Western Mounted Brigade, Southern Command.
- John Webster Cawston.
- Frederick John Dryhurst.
- Edmund Waterton Farnall.
- Edmund Gosse, LLD.
- Captain Maurice Pascal Alers Hankey, Royal Marine Artillery.
- William Vesey Harrel, MVO.
- Louis John Hewby.
- Walter Tapper Jerred.
- Thomas Milvain, KC.
- Alexander Pulling.
- Frank Pullinger.
- Herbert Vincent Reade.
- Richard Augustine Studdert Redmayne.
- Robert Henry Rew.
- John Shuckburgh Risley.
- Thomas William Leisk Spence.
- George Joshua Stanley, CMG.
- Thomas Lonsdale Webster.
- Roland Field Wilkins.

=== Order of the Star of India ===
==== Knight Commander (KCSI) ====
- John Nathaniel Atkinson, CSI, Indian Civil Service, an Ordinary Member of the Council of the Governor of Fort St. George.
- William Thomson Morison, CSI, Indian Civil Service (Retd.), lately an Ordinary Member of the Council of the Governor of Bombay.

==== Companion (CSI) ====
- Abbas Ali Baig, Member of the Council of India.
- Oswald Campbell Lees, late Chief Engineer and Secretary to the Government of Burma, Public Works Department.
- Paul Gregory Melitus, CIE, Indian Civil Service, lately Member of the Board of Revenue, Eastern Bengal and Assam.
- Lieutenant-Colonel Albert Edward Woods, Indian Army, Deputy Commissioner, Naga Hills.
- William Exall Tempest Bennett, Chief Engineer to the Government of the Punjab, Public Works Department, Irrigation Branch.
- Honorary Major Sahibzada Obaidullah Khan, Commandant, Bhopal Imperial Service Troops.
- William Ogilvie Home, Indian Civil Service, Acting Third Member of the Board of Revenue and Commissioner of Land Revenue and Forests, and a Member of the Council of the Governor of Fort St. George for making Laws and Regulations.
- Pazhamarneri Sundaram Aiyar Sivaswami Aiyar, CIE, an Ordinary Member of the Council of the Governor of Fort St. George.
- William Harrison Moreland, CIE, Indian Civil Service, lately Director of Land Records and Agriculture, United Provinces of Agra and Oudh.
- Edward Albert Gait, Indian Civil Service, Census Commissioner for India.
- Dewan Bahadur Chaube Raghunath Das, Dewan of the Kotah State, Rajputana.
- Colonel Lestock Hamilton Reid, Judge Advocate-General in India.
- Surgeon-General Henry Wickham Stevenson, Indian Medical Service, Surgeon General to the Government of Bombay, and an Additional Member of the Council of the Governor of Bombay for making Laws and Regulations.

=== Order of Saint Michael and Saint George ===
==== Knight Grand Cross of the Order of St Michael and St George (GCMG) ====
- The Right Honourable Lord Chelmsford, KCMG, Governor of the State of New South Wales.

Honorary Knights Grand Cross

- Muhammad Said Pasha, President of the Council and Minister of the Interior, Egypt.

==== Knight Commander of the Order of St Michael and St George (KCMG) ====
- The Honourable Sir William Portus Cullen, LLD, Lieutenant-Governor of the State of New South Wales and Chief Justice of the Supreme Court.
- The Honourable Rodmond Roblin, Premier and President of Council of the Province of Manitoba.
- The Honourable Richard McBride, KC, Premier of the Province of British Columbia.
- Harry Newton Phillips Wollaston, CMG ISO, lately Comptroller-General, Department of Trade and Customs, Commonwealth of Australia.
- Lionel Edward Gresley Garden, His Majesty's Envoy Extraordinary and Minister Plenipotentiary to the Republics of Guatemala, Honduras and Salvador.
- Everard Duncan Home Fraser, CMG, His Majesty's Consul-General, at Shanghai.
- Colonel George Bohun Macauley, Royal Engineers, CMG, Director-General of Egyptian State Railways.
- His Honour Sir Thomas William Snagge, British Delegate at the International Conferences at Paris on the White Slave Traffic, 1902 and 1906.
- Louis Mallet, CB, Assistant Under-Secretary of State for Foreign Affairs.
- Walter Louis Frederick Goltz Langley, CB, Assistant Under-Secretary of State for Foreign Affairs.

==== Companion of the Order of St Michael and St George (CMG) ====
- Major Walter Guy, Baron Bentinck, DSO, lately Assistant Imperial Secretary to the High Commissioner for South Africa.
- William Geoffrey Cahill, Commissioner of Police of the State of Queensland.
- Edward Cleather Fraser, Nominated Member of the Council of Government of the Colony of Mauritius.
- Herbert Symond Goldsmith, First Class Resident, Protectorate of Northern Nigeria.
- Noel Janisch, Provincial Secretary, Cape of Good Hope Province, Union of South Africa.
- Lieutenant-Colonel James Gordon Legge, of the Military Forces of the Commonwealth of Australia.
- John McDougald, Commissioner, Department of Customs, Dominion of Canada.
- James Melville Macoun, Assistant Botanist and Naturalist, Geological Survey, Department of Mines, Dominion of Canada.
- Major Percy Morris Robinson, Royal West Kent Regiment, in recognition of services in connection with the West African Frontier Force.
- Frederic George Thomas, in recognition of services in connection with the reception of the Prime Ministers of the Self-Governing Dominions, 1911.
- Richard James Wilkinson, Colonial Secretary of the Straits Settlements.
- Charles Morris Woodford, Deputy Commissioner and Resident, British Solomon Islands Protectorate.
- Andrew Balfour, MD, Director of Government Research Laboratories, Gordon Memorial College, Khartoum.
- Andrew Percy Bennett, Commercial Attaché to His Majesty's Embassies at Vienna and Rome, and to His Majesty's Legation at Athens.
- Henry Alfred Constant Bonar, His Majesty's Consul-General at Seoul.
- Francis Edward Crow, His Majesty's Consul at Basrah.
- James Currie, Principal of the Gordon Memorial College, Khartoum.
- William James Downer, ISO, Assistant Secretary, His Majesty's Office of Works.
- Herbert Goffe, lately Acting Consul General at Hankow.
- Lieutenant-Colonel Thomas Wolseley Haig, Indian Army, His Majesty's Consul at Kerman.
- John Carey Hall, ISO, His Majesty's Consul-General at Yokohama.
- Captain George Gillett Hunter, Director General of the Coastguard Administration in Egypt.
- Alfred Irwin, Interpreter and Dragoman to His Majesty's Legation at Tangier.
- Captain Macdougall Ralston Kennedy, late Royal Engineers, DSO, Director of the Public Works Department of the Sudan Government.
- The Honourable Ernest Stowell Scott, MVO, First Secretary to His Majesty's Legation at Peking.
- Frederick Edgar Wilkinson, His Majesty's Consul at Nanking.
- Lieutenant Arnold Talbot Wilson, Indian Army, recently Acting British Consul at Mohammerah.

Honorary Companion

- Dato Mohamed bin Mahbob, State Secretary, Johore.

=== Order of the Indian Empire ===
==== Knight Commander (KCIE) ====
- John Twigg, Indian Civil Service (Retd.), lately Acting First Member of the Board of Revenue and Commissioner of Salt, Abkari and Separate Revenue.
- George Abraham Grierson, CIE, Indian Civil Service (Retd.)
- Marc Aurel Stein, CIE D.Sc, Archaeological Department, Superintendent, North-West Frontier Circle.
- Major-General Francis Henry Rutherford Drummond, CB CIE, Indian Army (Retd.), lately Inspector-General of Imperial Service Troops.
- His Highness Rai-i-Rayan Maharawal-Sri Bijai Singh Bahadur, of Dungarpur, Rajputana.
- Nawab Bahrain Khan, CIE, Head of the Mazari Tribe in Dera Ghazi Khan, a Member of the Council of the Lieutenant Governor of the Punjab for making Laws and Regulations.
- Henry Alexander Kirk, CIE, India Office, Director-in-Chief, Indo-European Telegraph Department.

==== Companion (CIE) ====
- Pierce Langrishe Moore, Indian Civil Service, President of the Municipal Corporation of Madras.
- Alfred Chatterton, Indian Educational Service, Superintendent of Industrial Education, Madras.
- Major Arthur Abercromby Duff, lately Military Secretary to the Governor of Madras.
- Major John Lawrence William ffrench-Mullen, Indian Army, Commandant, Myitikyina Military Police Battalion, Burma.
- Bernard Coventry, Imperial Agricultural Service, Director of the Agricultural Research Institute, Officiating Inspector General of Agriculture.
- Albert John Harrison.
- Richard Hamilton Campbell, Indian Civil Service, Private Secretary to His Highness the Maharaja of Mysore.
- Rao Bahadur Bangalore Perumal Annaswami Mudaliar, Member of the Municipal Commission of the Civil and Military Station of Bangalore.
- Sidney Kilner Levett-Yeats, Accountant-General, Posts and Telegraphs, India.
- Frederick George Wigley, Barrister-at-Law, Assistant Secretary, Legislative Department, Bengal Government.
- Prafulla Chandra Ray, D.Sc, Educational Service, Professor, Presidency College, Calcutta.
- Colonel Francis Raymond, Principal, Veterinary College, Belgachia, Bengal.
- Colonel Michael Joseph Tighe, CB DSO, Commandant, 56th Punjabi Rifles (Frontier Force).
- Lieutenant-Colonel William Bernard James, MVO, lately on duty with the Coronation Durbar Committee.
- Major Sydney D'Aguilar Crookshank, MVO, Royal Engineers, Executive Engineer, Public Works Department, United Provinces of Agra and Oudh.
- Edward Denison Boss, in charge of the Records of the Government of India, and ex-officio Assistant Secretary, Education Department, Government of India.
- John Hugh Cox, Indian Civil Service, Commissioner of Excise in Central India.
- Khan Bahadur Muhammad Israr Hasan Khan, Provincial Civil Service, Judicial Minister, Bhopal State, Central India.
- Major Reginald O'Bryan Taylor, lately Commandant of the Imperial Cadet Corps.
- David Wann Aikman, Public Works Department, Sanitary Engineer, Punjab.
- Rai Bahadur Pandit Hari Kishan Kaul, Uncovenanted Civil Service, Punjab, Deputy Commissioner, 3rd Grade, and Superintendent of Census Operations.
- Lieutenant-Colonel Frederick William Wodehouse, Bombay Political Department, Resident at Kolhapur, and Political Agent, Southern Mahratta Country.
- Colonel Richard Henry Ewart, DSO, Indian Army, lately Director of Farms.
- Colonel Maitland Cowper, Indian Army, late General Staff Officer, 1st Grade, 1st Burma Division.
- Thomas Walker Arnold, India Office, Educational Adviser to Indian Students.
- Lieutenant-Colonel Charles Henry James, Indian Medical Service, Medical Adviser, Patiala State.

=== Royal Victorian Order ===
==== Knight Grand Cross of the Royal Victorian Order (GCVO) ====
- Admiral Sir Archibald Berkeley Milne, Bt KCB KCVO.

==== Knight Commander of the Royal Victorian Order (KCVO) ====
- Professor Alexander Ogston, MD.

==== Commander of the Royal Victorian Order (CVO) ====
- George Lenthal Cheatle, CB FRCS.
- Colonel Henry Streatfeild, CB MVO.
- Percival Horton-Smith Hartley, MVO MD.
- Major James Evan Baillie Martin, MVO.
- Inspector-General Belgrave Ninnis, Royal Navy (Retd.), MD.

==== Member of the Royal Victorian Order, 4th class (MVO) ====
- Willie Netterville Barren, MRCS.
- Major Edward Boustead Cuthbertson.

=== Companions of the Imperial Service Order (ISO) ===
Home Civil Service

- William David Barber, Chief Civil Assistant to the Hydrographer, Admiralty.
- Frederick Charles Davison, late Chief Accountant, War Office.
- John Duff, Consul, Gothenburg.
- Charles Edward Fagan, Assistant Secretary, British Museum.
- Lumley Arnold Marshall, Principal Clerk, Post Office.
- John Thomas Mulqueen, Collector of Customs and Excise, Dublin.
- Hugh Malcolm Robinson, Deputy Chief Inspector of Factories.
- John Emilius Ernest Steigen Berger Sharp, Assistant Record Keeper, Record Office.
- Joseph Simpson, Assistant Secretary and Comptroller, Dublin Inland Revenue.

Colonial Civil Service

- Louis Adams, Chief Cashier, Office of the Crown Agents for the Colonies.
- Edward Ernest Evelyn, Senior Assistant Colonial Secretary, Colony of Sierra Leone.
- Algernon Bernard Harcourt, Assistant Provincial Commissioner and Provincial Secretary, Eastern Province, Southern Nigeria.
- John William Holliman, Under Secretary for Finance and Trade, State of New South Wales.
- Robert Johnstone, Assistant Colonial Secretary of the Island of Jamaica.
- Charles William Langford, Excise Officer, Colony of Trinidad and Tobago.
- Edwin Faunce Lonsdale, Secretary for Justice (Legal), Department of Justice, Union of South Africa.
- Donald Robertson, Secretary, Post Office and Telegraph Department, Dominion of New Zealand.
- John Strauchon, Surveyor-General, Lands and Survey Department, Dominion of New Zealand.
- William Henry Walker, Chief Clerk, Department of External Affairs, Dominion of Canada.

Office of the Secretary of State for India

- Thomas Charles Fenton, Barrister-at Law, Staff Clerk-in-charge of the Parliamentary Branch of the Record Department.
- William Edmondson Phelps, Deputy Superintendent of the India Store Depot.
- Sir Richmond Thackeray Ritchie, KCB, Permanent Under-Secretary of State for India.

Civil Services in India

- Sir Charles Bayley, KCSI, Lieutenant Governor of Behar and Orissa.
- Babu Charu Chandra Goswami, Registrar, Assam Secretariat, Revenue and General Departments.
- William James Drake, Registrar to the Government of India, Public Works Department.
- Maung Po Sa, Additional District Judge, Thaton, Burma.
- John Charles Clancey, FRAS FSI, Assistant Director of Land Records, Burma.
- Nawab Saiyid Mahammad, Khan Bahadur, Provincial Executive Service, Inspector General of Registration, Bengal.
- George Joseph Rogers, Extra Assistant Resident, Kashmir, and Superintendent, Kashmir Residency Office.
- Mohammad Aziz-ud-din Hussain Sahib Bahadur, Khan Bahadur, Collector and Magistrate of South Arcot, Madras Presidency.
- Francis George Marshall, Deputy Commissioner of Salt, Abkari and Customs, Central Division, Madras Presidency.
- M. R. Ry. Chingleput Ratna Mudaliar Avergal, Chief Interpreter, Presidency Magistrate's Court, Egmore, Madras.
- Andrew Peter Mitchell, Provincial Educational Service, Inspector of Schools, Central Provinces.
- Babu Ram Smaran Lai, Provincial Executive Service, Deputy Collector, Farrakhabad, United Provinces.
- Leonard Charles Dixon Bean, Traffic Superintendent, North-Western State Railway.
- Rao Bahadur Kashinath Keshav Thakur, MA, LLB, Provincial Civil Service, Divisional and Sessions Judge, Nagpur.
- Conly James Dease, Superintendent of Post Offices, North-West Frontier Province.
- Isa Charan Chandu Lal, Punjab, Provincial Civil Service, Settlement Officer, Gujranwala, Punjab.
- Henry Raynor Goulding, VD, Assistant Secretary to the Financial Commissioners, Punjab.
- Rao Bahadur Vithalrai Himatram, Daftardar, Kathiawar Agency, Bombay Presidency.
- Henry Alfred Hall, late Superintendent, Deccan Extramural Gang, Bombay Presidency.
- Khan Bahadur Saiyed Shams-ud-din Saiyed Mian Kadri, Provincial Service, Oriental Translator to Government, Bombay Presidency.
- Robert George Girard, Collector of Income Tax, Bengal.
- Godrez Dorabjee Pudumjee, Deputy Accountant-General, Bombay.

=== Royal Red Cross (RRC) ===
- Amy Nixon, Matron, Queen Alexandra's Imperial Military Nursing Service.
- Mary Wilson, Matron, Queen Alexandra's Imperial Military Nursing Service.

=== Honorary Ranks ===
Honorary Major

- Nawab Muhammad Nasrulla Khan of Bhopal

Honorary Chaplain to His Majesty

- Reverend Philip Foster Raymond, MA, Senior Chaplain to the Forces, Aldershot, and Chaplain, First Class.
