= Thomas Chatterton (disambiguation) =

Thomas Chatterton (1752–1770) was an English poet and literary forger.

Thomas Chatterton may also be:

- Thomas Chatterton (MP), Member of Parliament from Petersfield, 1572–1583
- Thomas Chatterton Williams, born 1981, American writer

== See also ==
- Chatterton (disambiguation)
