= List of ambassadors of the United Kingdom to Cambodia =

The ambassador of the United Kingdom to Cambodia is the United Kingdom's foremost diplomatic representative in the Kingdom of Cambodia, and head of the UK's diplomatic mission in Cambodia. The official title is His Britannic Majesty's Ambassador to the Kingdom of Cambodia.

== List of heads of mission ==
=== Non-resident ministers ===
- 1946–1947: William Meiklereid
- 1948–1950: Frank Gibbs

No representation between 1950 and 1951, due to deteriorating conditions of Indo-China War

=== Non-resident ministers plenipotentiary and envoys extraordinary ===
- 1951: Frank Gibbs
- 1951–1954: Hubert Graves

=== Ambassadors ===
- 1954–1956: Richard Heppel
- 1956–1958: Norman Brain
- 1958–1961: Frederic Garner
- 1961–1964: Peter Murray
- 1964–1966: Leslie Fielding
- 1966–1970: Harold Brown
- 1970–1973: Anthony Williams
- 1973–1975: John Powell-Jones
- 1975–1976: John Bushell

No representation between 1976 and 1991, due to Khmer Rouge government policy, then Vietnamese occupation

=== Representatives with personal rank of ambassador ===
- 1991–1994: David Burns

=== Ambassadors ===
- 1994–1997: Paul Reddicliffe
- 1997–2000: George Edgar
- 2000–2005: Stephen Bridges
- 2005-2008 : David Reader
- 2008–2011: Andrew Mace
- 2011–2013: Mark Gooding
- 2014–2018: Bill Longhurst
- 2018–2022: Tina Redshaw
- 2022 – Present: Dominic Williams
