= Teddy Millington-Drake =

English artist

Edgar Louis Mackay Vanderstegen Millington-Drake (5 July 1932 – 5 September 1994), usually known as Teddy Millington-Drake, was an English artist, known mainly for his watercolour paintings but also abstract work in oils.

== Early life ==
Millington-Drake was born in London, England, on 5 July 1932. His parents were the diplomat Sir Eugen Millington-Drake, a noted eccentric, and his wife Lady Effie Mackay, a daughter of James Mackay, 1st Earl of Inchcape, Chairman of the Peninsular and Oriental Steam Navigation Company. His father's career meant that Teddy, his fourth child, travelled from an early age. He had visited Buenos Aires and Paris by the age of one, and spent his early years in Uruguay, where his father was British Minister between 1934 and 1941. There were many trips between Uruguay and the United Kingdom during those years.

Whilst Millington-Drake's early childhood abroad had been happy and privileged, he disliked the experience of the British preparatory school system. He had already developed an interest in sketching and painting, inspired by the fashion sketches supplied to his mother so that she could order her clothes from Worth in Paris. Later he thrived at Eton College, like his father before him. He took a great interest in art and was supervised by Wilfrid Blunt, the art historian.

== Adulthood ==
After Eton, Millington-Drake went up to Oxford University to read history but found the course was not for him. He left without taking his degree and went to live and study painting in Paris, before doing his National Service in the Rifle Brigade. He spent some time posted in Egypt during the Suez Crisis, where he became a close friend of James Mossman. He made friends easily throughout his life, and his friends and relations were very important to him. He was always a generous but sometimes distracted host.

After completing his National Service and in part inspired by his sister Marie’s anecdotes of her travels abroad, Millington-Drake embarked on a painting tour that took him to the Lebanon, Iran, Iraq and Syria. He was aided by his father's connections, which meant that diplomats abroad would often be pleased to see him, but he spent a great deal of time alone too, painting in hotel rooms or in the open air. Jonathan Hope, who wrote Millington-Drake’s obituary in The Independent, notes that "He loved this part of the world: the soukhs, the street life, the sounds and colours, and was dazzled by the power and simplicity of Islamic architecture".

In the late 1950s Millington-Drake rented a house, the Villa Albrizzi at Este in the Veneto. He started painting abstract murals more regularly, particularly during this period. He befriended Freya Stark, the travel writer who lived nearby, and in Venice he enjoyed the company of Daisy Fellowes, Peggy Guggenheim, Barbara Hutton and Elsa Maxwell. He was influenced by, and in turn himself influenced, Bruce Chatwin, who was another writer and traveller. Chatwin often stayed with him at Este and at his other houses abroad; the pair had first met when they were in their twenties.

A trip round the Greek islands in the early 1960s resulted in Millington-Drake discovering Patmos, which left a deep impression on him. In 1963 he bought two 17th-century houses on the island, in the village of Chora, and set about building works that converted them into an enchanting, relaxing environment, complete with a studio, that was greatly admired by the friends who came to stay. The house, remodelled under the direction of the interior designer John Stefanidis, was run with the assistance of several members of staff. It featured often in magazines and caught the eye of Jacqueline Kennedy Onassis, whom Millington-Drake promptly invited to lunch.

Millington-Drake embarked on an adventurous trip to Easter Island in 1987 to paint the celebrated stone statues for an exhibition, which he had been wanting to do for a long time. Unfortunately the exhibition was not popular because people found the statues gloomy.

His house in Italy was his base from 1974 for just under 20 years. It was an old farmhouse which he converted most sympathetically at Monti in Chianti near Siena in Tuscany and also designed a beautiful garden.

Millington-Drake was influenced by, and in turn himself influenced, Bruce Chatwin, who was another writer and traveller. The bisexual Chatwin often stayed with him at Este and elsewhere outside the United Kingdom; the pair had first met when they were in their twenties and they became lovers for some time.

He died on 5 September 1994. The cause of death was AIDS, from which Chatwin had also died four years earlier. Millington-Drake had undergone treatment for HIV in London but, despite being extremely ill, managed to fulfill his wish to die at home on Patmos, arriving there around 24 hours before his death.

He was buried after a service at the Convent of Zoodochou Pigi, which he had supported for many years.

== Art ==
Millington-Drake was an exceptional architectural draughtsman, as his watercolours show, particularly those of Italy in his earliest days and of India, Italy and Patmos much later.

However, in his late twenties he turned to abstract painting, influenced by the American Expressionists Cy Twombly and Jackson Pollock. In his abstract work he felt he could express himself more creatively.

Millington-Drake returned to the figurative style, concentrating for a time on still lifes and flower paintings. These linked his paintings with another great interest, garden design. As a result of his success with his own garden at Poggio he was commissioned to create two new gardens in Italy and restored the garden at Bellerive near Geneva, originally designed by Lanning Roper.

Some of Millington-Drake's art is in public collections such as the striking plates in bright colours designed by him and made by Franca Pinna in Rome which are at the Victoria and Albert Museum. His range of subject matter was as eclectic as his choice of materials. Although he worked in various paint mediums, including acrylics, his topographical watercolours are greatly admired and were exhibited in many cities including Bombay and New York, as well as London. There was a particularly successful exhibition in London of watercolours of India and Ladakh held in 1982. Hope notes that "Viewed retrospectively his pictures form a seductive narrative of travels spanning more than 30 years, in search of some romantic and melancholy ideal".

London's Lefevre Gallery mounted a tribute titled “Travels with Teddy Millington-Drake : a memorial exhibition" that ran from 7 November to 27 November 1996. A limited subscription edition of a memoir written by Millington-Drake and edited by John McEwen with input from Diana di Carcaci and Jill Quaife was also published in that year, entitled Shapes on the Horizon. It included tributes from friends such as Bruce Chatwin, Diana Melly and Felicity Sutherland among many others. He also wrote poetry and an anthology of his poems was published in Paris in 1977.
