= Chatterton (disambiguation) =

Thomas Chatterton (1752–1770) was an English poet and forger of pseudo-medieval poetry.

Chatterton may also refer to:

== Places ==
- Chatterton, Indiana (extinct)
- Chatterton, Lancashire

== Other uses ==
- Chatterton (horse), a racehorse
- Chatterton (surname)
- Chatterton (de Vigny), an 1835 drama by Alfred de Vigny
- Chatterton (opera), an 1876 opera by Ruggiero Leoncavallo
- "Chatterton," a song released in 1967 by French singer, songwriter, actor and director Serge Gainsbourg
- Chatterton (album), a 1994 album by French singer Alain Bashung
- Chatterton (novel), a 1987 book by Peter Ackroyd

== See also ==
- Chatterton's compound, an early material for waterproofing submarine cables
- Chatterton House, the former Lamb Hotel, Nantwich, Cheshire
- T. C. Hammond (Thomas Chatterton Hammond, 1877–1961), Irish Anglican cleric
- Thomas Chatterton Williams (born 1981), American cultural critic and author
- Chatterton Village an area of the London Borough of Bromley, in southeast London, England, near Bromley Common and Southborough
