= Hubert Graves =

British diplomat (1894–1972)

Sir Hubert Graves KCMG MC

British Ambassador to the Republic of Vietnam
- In office 1954–1955
- Preceded by: Office created
- Succeeded by: Sir Hugh Stephenson

British Minister to Laos, Cambodia and Vietnam
- In office 1951–1954
- Preceded by: Office created
- Succeeded by: Office abolished

Personal details
- Born: 10 August 1894
- Died: 5 April 1972 (aged 75)
- Children: 2
- Occupation: Diplomat

Sir Hubert Ashton Graves (10 August 1894 – 5 April 1972) was a British diplomat who served as British Minister to the associate states of Vietnam, Cambodia and Laos from 1951 to 1954 and Ambassador to the Republic of Vietnam from 1954 to 1955.

== Career ==
Graves served with Leicestershire Regiment and the Machine Gun Corps during World War I. In 1918, he was awarded the Military Cross. After working at the Inland Revenue Department for several years, he entered the Consular Service in 1926, and served in various posts in the Far East. In 1926, he was appointed a student interpreter in the Far Eastern Consular Service. In 1928, he was appointed vice-consul in Japan., and in 1939, consul at Osaka. From 1942 to 1945, he was seconded to the Naval Board and Department of External Affairs, Australia, on special duties, and in 1945 was controller in the Far Eastern Division of the Political Intelligence Department.

After World War II, Graves was appointed counsellor at the British Embassy at Washington, a post he held from 1946 to 1951. In 1951, he was appointed Minister to Vietnam, Cambodia and Laos. In 1954, following the Geneva Conference which separated the three separate states of French Indochina, the status of the post in Vietnam was raised to an Embassy, and he became Ambassador to the Republic of Vietnam (South Vietnam), serving in the post until his retirement in 1955.

== Personal life and death ==
Graves married twice. First, in 1921 to Madeleine Constance Marie Michelle Bourdillon and they had a son. After she died, he married Albertine Louise Macon in 1929 and they had a daughter.

Graves died on 5 April 1972, aged 77.

== Honours ==
Graves was appointed Companion of the Order of St Michael and St George (CMG) in the 1947 Birthday Honours, and promoted to Knight Commander (KCMG) in the 1953 New Year Honours. In 1918, he was awarded the Military Cross (MC).

== See also ==
- United Kingdom–Vietnam relations
- Laos–United Kingdom relations
- Cambodia–United Kingdom relations

Diplomatic posts
New office	British Minister to Laos, Cambodia and Vietnam; 1951–1954	Succeeded by Office abolished
New office	British Ambassador to the Republic of Vietnam; 1954–1955	Succeeded by Sir Hugh Stephenson
