= Paul Reddicliffe =

British diplomat (born 1945)

Paul Reddicliffe OBE

British Ambassador to Cambodia
- In office 1994–1997
- Preceded by: David Burns
- Succeeded by: George Edgar

Personal details
- Born: 17 March 1945
- Education: Bedford Modern School
- Alma mater: Jesus College, Oxford; SOAS, University of London
- Occupation: British diplomat

Paul Reddicliffe OBE (born 17 March 1945) was British Ambassador to the Kingdom of Cambodia (1994–1997).

== Life ==
Paul Reddicliffe was born on 17 March 1945. He was educated at Bedford Modern School, Jesus College, Oxford, and SOAS, University of London.

Reddicliffe joined HM Diplomatic Service in 1977 and was Indochina Analyst (1977–85), First Secretary in Canberra (1985–89), Indochina Analyst (1989–92), Head of Southeast Asia Section (1992–94) and Ambassador to the Kingdom of Cambodia (1994–97). He was invested as an Officer of the Order of the British Empire in 1998.

In 1974 Reddicliffe married Wee Siok Boi; they have two sons.
