= John Stefanidis =

English interior designer (born 1937)

- Born: 20 January 1937 (age 89); Cairo, Egypt
- Education: Brasenose College, Oxford
- Occupation: Interior designer
- Website: www.johnstefanidis.com

John Stefanidis is a British-based, Egyptian-born interior designer and founder of the London-based interior design firm John Stefanidis Brands, Ltd. His clients include the Bank of England, Claridges and Rocco Forte's Le Richemond Hotel.

== Early life and education ==
John Stefanidis was born in Cairo, Egypt, to Alexandrine Greek parents, Panayotis Constantinos Stefanidis and Eliane Sophie Mordo, both of whose grandmothers were born on the Ionian island of Corfu; Panayotis Petsalis in a devout Greek Orthodox family, and Eliane’s grandmother, née Viterbo, in a Sephardic Jewish family.

Early in the Second World War, John's father Panayotis Constantinos Stefanidis had to choose whether to join the then exiled Greek Army, which was in disarray, although it later proved to be a great help to the Allies, or to accept the honorary rank of major in the British army, serving in the Occupied Enemy Territory of Eritrea, newly won by the British from the Italians in the Ethiopian campaign. He chose the latter, a choice that would determine young Stefanidis’ formative years.

His young wife, Eliane, and four-year-old John, who attended the Lycée Français, remained in Cairo, but not for long, as Eliane Stefanidis defied the prohibition on wives and children joining their husbands in the newly occupied country. Taking a job with BOAC (British Overseas Airlines Corporation), Eliane and her son embarked on a seaplane that landed on the Nile in Khartoum, where they spent the night before boarding a Dakota aircraft for Asmara, where they were met by a very surprised Panayotis. Although he worked in the capital, Asmara, John and his mother lived in Massawa on the Red Sea, in a cool, trellised house with verandahs, built in the Italian style, with gazelles in the garden to entertain his young son.

John initially attended a small Greek school (where Stefanidis recalls cane-wielding priests), but when the restriction imposed on wives and children was lifted, a small school was scratched up, where John spoke English, in addition to the Greek and French he spoke at home. As a child, John was ferried around in a ‘calessino,’ a racy horse-drawn carriage, the obliging driver in khaki uniform and dashing red tarboosh. As this and other digressions were considered too spoiling, he was dispatched to Cairo where he would be raised by his maternal aunt and her brother. His aunt, who was a radiologist at the Croissant Rouge Hospital, beloved by its doctors who were mostly Copt, had a habit of collecting the poor and unfortunate from the street and taking them to the hospital for treatment. Having had a French education as a teenager while stranded in Paris during the First World War where she was being treated for tuberculosis, she read the classics of French literature aloud to her young nephew.

His uncle was an eccentric whose bedside reading was Dante’s Divine Comedy. His Arabic was so good, which was most unusual for a non-Egyptian, that he went regularly to the popular Egyptian theatre, reminiscent of Goldoni in its wits and exuberance, and over the years relentlessly marched his nephew through the Cairo Museum of Antiquities, instilling in him an avidity for history and the cultures of the past.

== Education ==
John Stefanidis attended the Gezira Preparatory School in Cairo, on the island of Zamalek in the Nile, before progressing at age twelve to the English school in Heliopolis.

In an interview, John recalls that "the school was very cosmopolitan, with Armenians, Greeks, Saudis, Syrians, Lebanese, German, Chinese, as well as the Egyptian elite, who were Muslims, Christians, Copts and Jews. The rule was that only English was learnt, as otherwise it would have become a Tower of Babel at the edge of the desert". Short holidays were spent with his paternal grandmother or maternal cousins in Stefanidis’ beloved Alexandria. Summer holidays lasted three months to avoid the Egyptian heat, during which he was sent to the much cooler Eritrea or travelled to Europe with his parents.

In 1955, Stefanidis left Egypt to attend Brasenose College, Oxford, knowing that he would never live in his birthland again. King Farouk had been exiled and Nasser was ridding the country of all foreigners, which meant the dissipation and exile of a large part of the Italian, Jewish, British, French, and Greek communities, many of whom had lived peacefully side by side for hundreds of years. Their schools and institutions were closed, and their members scattered to the ends of the earth. Stefanidis graduated from Oxford in 1958.

He began his professional life in advertising, working for a year in London at Coleman Prentis & Varley, and then for five years in Milan. In a newspaper article, he said "the architecture, the pictures, the beauty of Italy served to develop my eye".

While traveling, he and the artist Teddy Millington Drake came upon the remote Dodecanese island of Patmos, where St. John received what was to become the New Testament book, Revelations. Beneath the fortified eleventh-century Byzantine monastery of St John the Theologian is the ancient village of Chora where Millington-Drake and Stefanidis bought and restored a house. Stefanidis went on to design another ten houses, which established an aesthetic standard that he has maintained ever since.

On Patmos, he found his metier Stefanidis’ reputation for design grew internationally, and in 1967, he founded his London-based design practice. He quickly established a reputation for reliability, speed, and excellence. His style was described as 'having a sense of form & a technique reminiscent of a painter...a Stefanidis home is filled with light..well-prepared and extremely comfortable.'

The Stefanidis studio in Chelsea employed mainly graduates of the Royal College of Art, and it became a seedbed for many successful designers, notably Anthony Collett, Philip Hooper, Gael Camu, and Bruce Cavell. The studio provided a full house service, designing exteriors and interiors as well as textiles, carpets, and furniture for a diverse clientele, incorporating geography, history, and climate for each project.

Drawing on his fifty-year experience as a pioneer in the industry, Stefanidis continues to work on a mix of international projects both private and commercial, as well as diverse consultancies.

Among his clients: The Bank of England N.M. Rothschild Claridge’s Hotel, The Berkley Hotel, Le Richmond Geneva- Rocco Forte Hotel The British Embassy, Washington, D.C.

Private commissions include: Princess Aida Abdul Aziz, Riyadh, Saudi Arabia His Excellency Mr. Ali Jeddah, London and Surrey Mr. and Mrs. John Angelicoussis, Athens Mr. William L. Bernhard, New York and Patmos M. and Mme. George Lillaz, Paris and Geneva Mrs. Michael Chandris, Gstaad Lord and Lady Paul Channon, London Mrs. Ann Getty, London and San Francisco Lord and Lady Glenconner, London and Mustique Mr. John L. Goulandris, Athens Prince Sadruddin Aga Khan, Patmos Mr. and Mrs. Peter Joost, San Francisco Sir Henry and the Hon. Lady Keswick, London and Wiltshire Lord and Lady Lambton, London Mr. and Mrs. A Leventis, London and Spetses, Greece The Hon. Mrs Marten, Crichel House, Dorset M. and Mme. O Plouvier, Paris and St. Tropez Dr. Mortimer Sackler, London Lord Weidenfeld, London The Duke and Duchess of Westminster, London, Cheshire, Lancashire, and Scotland Mr. and Mrs. Galen Weston, Fort Belvedere, Surrey; Toronto, Windsor; Florida Mr. and Mrs. Leslie Wexner, Ohio, New York, Georgia, London, Warwickshire Mr. and Mrs. R. Cisneros, Caracas Mr. and Mrs. Hasan Çolakoglou, Istanbul Mr. Axel Springer, Patmos Countess Cinzano, London and Portugal

== Bibliography ==
- —— (1997). Living By Design: A Country House and Garden. Weidenfeld & Nicolson. ISBN 978-0297836278.
- —— (1997). Rooms: Design & Decoration: Design and Decoration. Weidenfeld & Nicolson. ISBN 978-1857999266.
- —— (2007). John Stefanidis Designs. Cassell. ISBN 978-1844032082.
- —— (2010). An Island Sanctuary: A House in Greece. Rizzoli International Publications. ISBN 978-0847833184.

== See also ==
- Teddy Millington-Drake
