= Patricia Hutchinson =

British diplomat (1926–2008)

Patricia Margaret Hutchinson CMG CBE (18 June 1926 - 11 December 2008) was a British diplomat, and ambassador to Uruguay in the early 1980s.

== Early life ==
She was the second child of Francis Hutchinson, born in Madrid. Her father was a banker and worked for the Bank of London and South America.

She went to schools in Madrid and a boarding school in Kent. She became fluent in French and Spanish. She returned to England in a Royal Navy convoy from Gibraltar to the UK in 1941, attending Casterton School, a boarding school in Cumbria.

== Career ==
She worked for the Board of Trade for a year from 1947. She joined the Diplomatic Service in July 1948.

=== Ambassador ===
She became Ambassador in January 1980, replacing William Peters who became High Commissioner to Malawi. The first British female ambassador had been appointed in 1976, who was in Denmark

She was ambassador to Uruguay from 1980 to 1983.

=== Falklands War ===
HMS Hecla (A133), a converted hydrographic-survey ship, was a hospital ship that arrived in Uruguay in early June 1982 with 24 Argentine prisoners. She was responsible for much of the repatriation of Argentine prisoners. She was important in Falklands war in evacuating the British wounded, the re-supply of hospital ships, and repatriation of Argentine prisoners.

For this work she was awarded the CBE on Monday 11 October 1982.

She retired in 1986.

== Personal life ==
She was awarded the CMG in the 1981 Birthday Honours.
