= John Balsir Chatterton =

English harpist

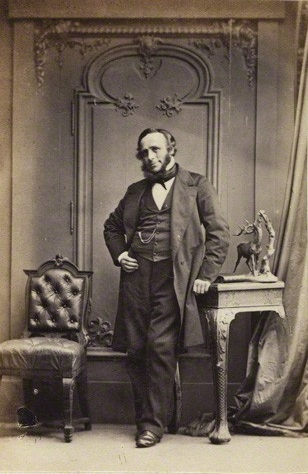
- 1862 photo by Camille Silvy
- Born: 25 November 1804; Portsmouth, England
- Died: 9 April 1871 (aged 66); Portman Square, London
- Occupation: Harpist

John Balsir Chatterton (25 November 1804 – 9 April 1871) was an English harpist.

== Biography ==
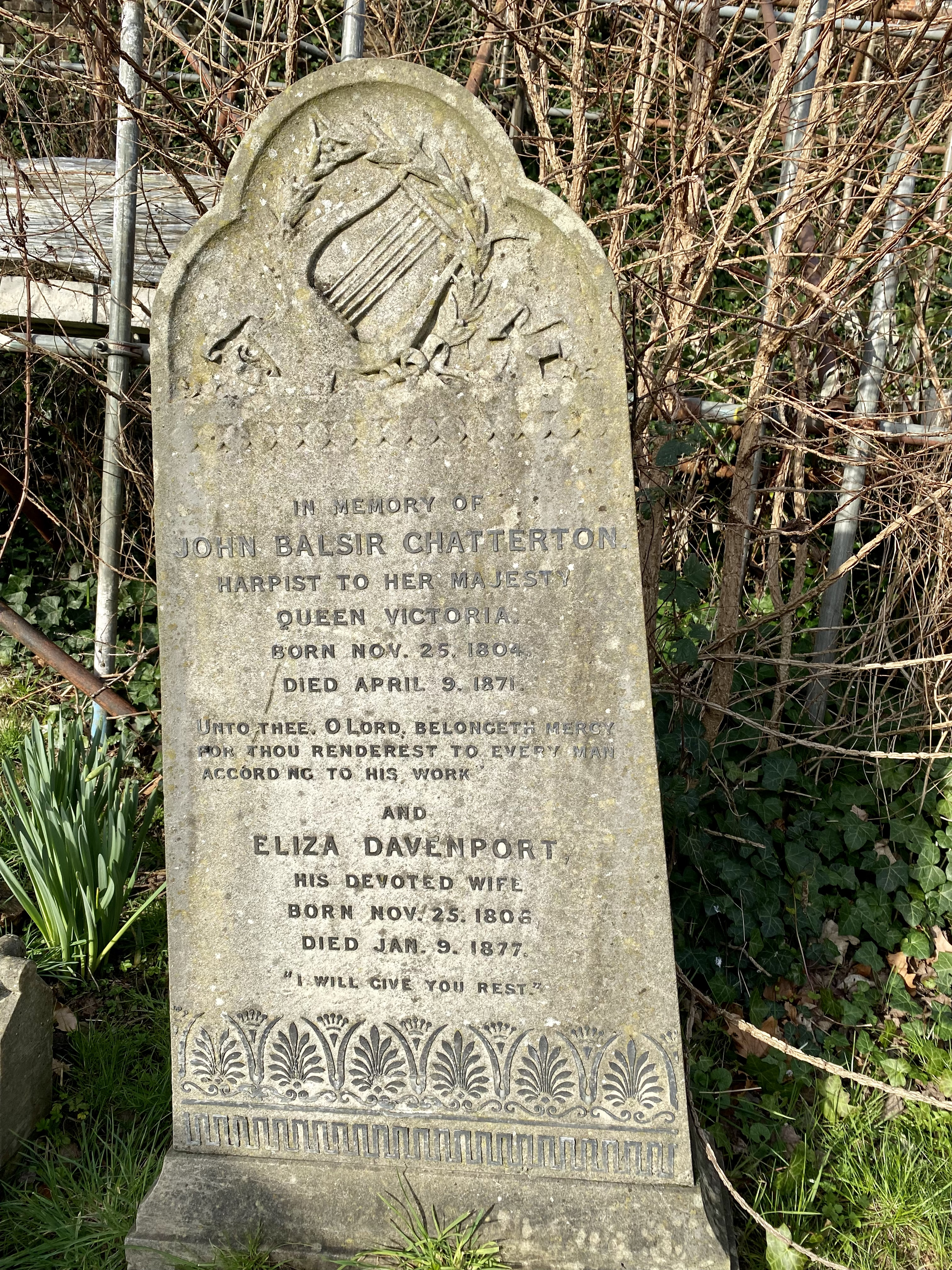
Chatterton's grave at Kensal Green Cemetery in 2024

John Balsir Chatterton was born at Portsmouth on 25 November 1804 the son of Mary née Callow and John Chatterton, a 'professor of music'. He was the third oldest of eight brothers and three sisters. He came to London, and studied the harp under Bochsa and Labarre, succeeding the former as professor at the Royal Academy of Music. His first appearance in London took place at a concert given by Aspull in 1824. Chatterton married Eliza Davenport Latham on 4 August 1835 and they had five sons. In 1842 he received the appointment of harpist to Queen Victoria. His last public performance at Windsor was on the occasion of the marriage of Princess Louise. He died after two days' illness in Portman Square, London on 9 April 1871 and was buried at Kensal Green. Chatterton wrote a considerable amount of harp music, mostly consisting of fantasias and arrangements. As a performer, his talents were overshadowed by those of his younger brother, Frederick Chatterton.

His nephew F. B. Chatterton (1834-1886) was the lessee of the Theatre Royal, Drury Lane from 1866 to 1879.

== Selected works ==
- "Brilliant Fantasia, introducing Italian Melodies"
- "God Save the Queen, with Variations"
- "Introduction and Variations on 'Cease Your Funning'"
- "Recollections of the Enchantress, fantasia for harp"
- "Souvenir de Mozart", medley for harp
