= Geoffrey Jackson =

British diplomat and writer

Sir Geoffrey Jackson
- Born: 4 March 1915
- Died: 1 October 1987 (aged 72)
- Education: Bolton School; Emmanuel College, Cambridge
- Occupations: diplomat and writer
- Spouse: Patricia Mary Evelyn Delany

Sir Geoffrey Holt Seymour Jackson KCMG (4 March 1915 – 1 October 1987) was a British diplomat and writer. In 1971, during his tenure as British ambassador to Uruguay, he was kidnapped by the Tupamaros guerrillas and ultimately released after eight months of captivity.

== Background and earlier career ==
Jackson received his education at Bolton School and Emmanuel College, Cambridge. He entered the Foreign Service in 1937 and served in Beirut, Cairo, Baghdad, Basra, Bogotá and Bern before being appointed Minister to Honduras in 1956. The next year he was promoted to ambassador when the post was upgraded. He was Consul-General at Seattle for the north-western US states 1960–1964 and Minister (Commercial) in Toronto 1965–1969.

== HM Ambassador to Uruguay ==
In 1969 he became ambassador in Uruguay. He was kidnapped by Tupamaros guerrillas in 1971, enduring a captivity of nine months. Released in September 1971, he retired at the end of 1972 with the honorary rank of Deputy Under-Secretary of State at the Foreign Office, having served for 35 years in the diplomatic service, of which 31 had been spent abroad.

=== Kidnapping ===
Jackson was kidnapped by Tupamaros guerrillas on 8 January 1971 in Montevideo, Uruguay. He was released after eight months of captivity, on 9 September 1971. Three decades later it became known that Edward Heath, the UK Prime Minister at that time, negotiated a deal for Jackson's release, brokered by Salvador Allende, President of Chile, who was in contact with the Tupamaros rebels. £42,000 was paid for Jackson's release.

== Later life ==
He served for five years, 1976–80, on the BBC's General Advisory Council (abolished in the 1990s) and was chairman of a BBC advisory group on the social effects of television.

== Honours ==
Geoffrey Jackson was appointed CMG in the New Year Honours of 1963 and knighted KCMG in 1971 after his release from captivity.

== Books ==
- The oven-bird, and some others. Illustrations by George Adamson. London: Faber. 1972. ISBN 0571102018.
- People's Prison. London: Faber. 1973. ISBN 057110424X.
- Surviving the long night: an autobiographical account of a political kidnapping. New York: Vanguard Press. 1974. ISBN 0814907563.
- Concorde diplomacy: the ambassador's role in the world today. London: Hamilton. 1981. ISBN 0241105242.

== Notes ==
Diplomatic posts
Preceded by John Coghill	Envoy Extraordinary and Minister Plenipotentiary at Tegucigalpa; 1956–1957	Succeeded by himself, as Ambassador
Preceded by himself, as Minister	Ambassador Extraordinary and Plenipotentiary at Tegucigalpa; 1957–1960	Succeeded by Richard Tollinton
Preceded by Sir Keith Unwin	Ambassador Extraordinary and Plenipotentiary at Montevideo; 1969–1972	Succeeded by Peter Oliver
