= Walter Baring (diplomat) =

British diplomat

Minister Resident and Consul-General to Uruguay
- In office 1893–1906
- Preceded by: Ernest Mason Satow
- Succeeded by: Robert Kennedy

Personal details
- Born: 22 October 1844 Cromer Hall, Cromer, Norfolk
- Died: 3 April 1915 (aged 70) London, England
- Spouse: Ellen Guarracino (m. 1875; died 1914)
- Children: Nina Leveson-Gower, Countess Granville; Oliver Baring
- Parent(s): Henry Baring; Cecilia Anne Windham

Walter Baring (22 October 1844 – 3 April 1915) was an English diplomat.

== Early life ==
Baring was born on 22 October 1844 at Cromer Hall, Cromer, Norfolk into the Baring family. He was the tenth and youngest son of banker and politician Henry Baring and, his second wife, Cecilia Anne Windham. His father was first married, and divorced, to Maria Matilda Bingham. Among his siblings were elder half-brother Henry Bingham Baring, MP for Callington and Marlborough, and older full brothers, Edward, raised to the peerage as 1st Baron Revelstoke, and Evelyn, who inherited Cromer Hall and was raised to the peerage as 1st Earl of Cromer, and banker Tom Baring.

His paternal grandparents were Sir Francis Baring, 1st Baronet, and the former Harriet Herring (a daughter of William Herring). His maternal grandparents were Vice-Admiral William Lukin Windham and Anne Thellusson (daughter of Genevan banker Peter Thellusson).

== Career ==
Baring, who was educated at Eton and Oxford, was a member of the Diplomatic Service from 1865 until 1906, culminating with his service as Minister Resident at Montevideo and Consul-General to Uruguay between 1893 and 1906.

== Personal life ==
In 1875, Baring married Ellen Guarracino (d. 1914), daughter of Frederick Guarracino. Together, they were the parents of:

- Nina Ayesha Baring (1876–1955), who married Granville Leveson-Gower, 3rd Earl Granville, son of Granville Leveson-Gower, 2nd Earl Granville, in 1900.
- Oliver Baring (1879–1941), who married Phoebe Bonser, a daughter of Sir John Winfield Bonser, in 1906.
- Edith Mary Emily Baring (1889–1889), who died young.

His wife died on 21 January 1914 and Baring died in London on 3 April 1915 at age 70.

Diplomatic posts
Preceded by Ernest Mason Satow	Minister Resident and Consul-General to the Oriental Republic of the Uruguay; 1893–1906	Succeeded by Robert Kennedy
