= Juan Manuel Besnes e Irigoyen =

Uruguayan calligrapher and painter

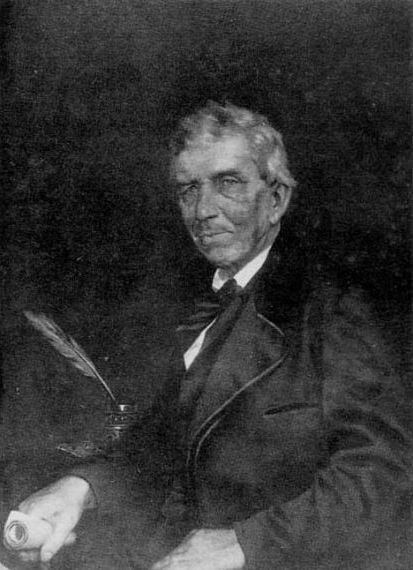
- Born: 12 July 1789; San Sebastián, Spain
- Died: 21 August 1865 (aged 75); Montevideo, Uruguay
- Occupations: Calligrapher, painter

Juan Manuel Besnes e Irigoyen (12 July 1789 – 21 August 1865) was a Spanish-born Uruguayan calligrapher and painter who was of Basque origin.
