= Frederick Chatterton =

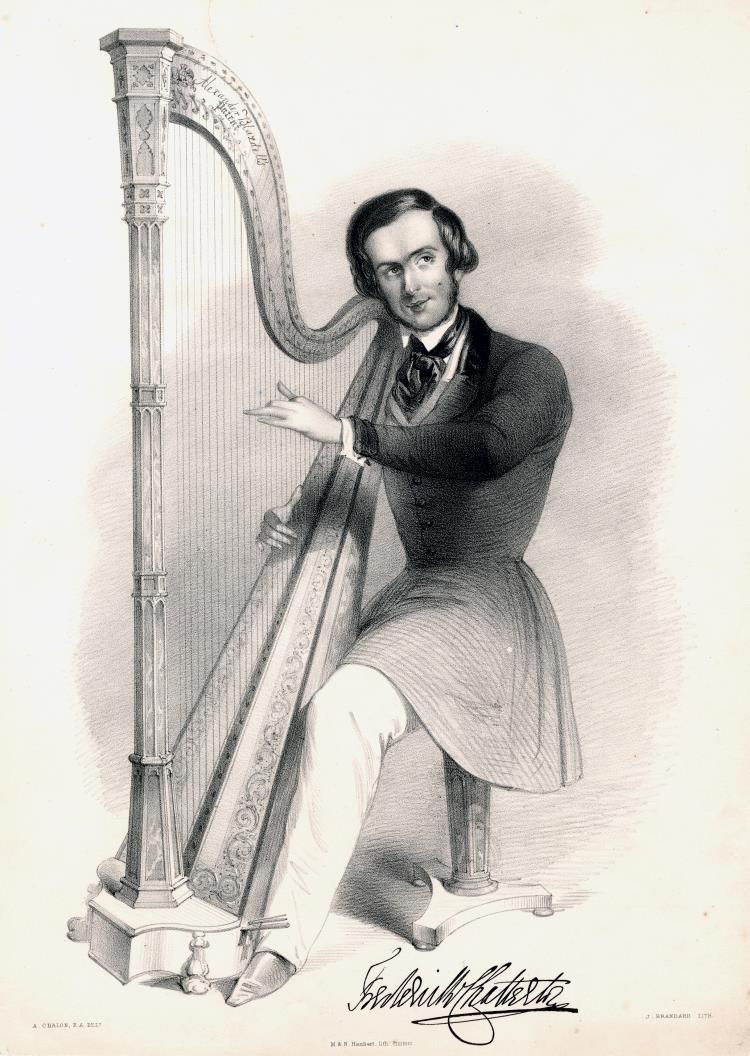
Frederick Chatterton in 1844

Frederick Chatterton (1812 – 1894) was one of the leading British harpists of the mid to late 19th-century and a composer of music for the harp.

== Biography ==
Frederick Chatterton was born at Portsmouth in 1812, the son of Mary née Callow (1779-1844) and John Chatterton (1778-), 'professor of music' who with his wife had eight sons and three daughters. Earlier in life John Chatterton had inherited and spent a large fortune and not wanting the same thing to happen to his sons decided that at least three of them should become successful harpists. Two, the oldest and youngest - John Balsir Chatterton and Frederick Chatterton, followed their father's wishes. However, Edward Andrew Chatterton (c1809–1875), the second son, did not wish to follow his father's plan and instead became, at various times, a music publisher, a seller of musical instruments and a front of house manager at Sadler's Wells Theatre. Frederick Chatterton's older brother John Balsir Chatterton was harpist to Queen Victoria. Like his brother before him, Frederick came to London where he studied the harp under Bochsa and Labarre. He was harpist to HRH the Duchess of Gloucester and Edinburgh and the Royal Courts of France and Belgium, having performed for Louis Philippe I, King of France in a Grand Concert in the Hall of the Marshalls of France in the Tuileries Palace. In June 1842 at the Queen's Concerts Rooms in Hanover Square he gave a concert of his own compositions and played in Doncaster in January 1856 where he played his own compositions - 'Highland Ballads', 'Welsh Bardic Illustrations', 'Morceau Fantastique' and 'Partant Pour Le Syrie'.

In March 1847 he played with the Distin Family in two concerts at the Hanover Square Rooms in London, while in February 1861 he played at General Reid's Commemoration Concert at the Reid Concert Hall in Edinburgh in Scotland. In September 1858 Chatterton gave a concert at the Assembly Rooms on Guernsey, while in July 1862 he played in Cambria, a duet for two pedal harps written by John Thomas, a former student of Chatterton's brother, for a concert of Welsh music at The Crystal Palace with Thomas himself also playing. In March 1870 he played in Madame Laura Baxter's Grand Musical Festival at the Theatre Royal, Drury Lane, then under the management of his nephew, Frederick Balsir Chatterton, while June 1874 saw him playing a harp solo in a concert at the Hanover Square Rooms.

In 1835 he married harpist Jane Saxton (1813–1906) and with her had four children: Josephine Chatterton (1838–1913); Frederick Montague Chatterton (1846–1919); George Chatterton (1848–), and Jane Frederica Chatterton (1851–1895).

His daughter Josephine Chatterton was Director of the Chicago Harp College and Professor of Harp at Trinity College London, while his nephew F. B. Chatterton (1834-1886) was the lessee of the Theatre Royal, Drury Lane from 1866 to 1879.

== Selected works ==
- The Dawn of Spring
- Queen Victoria's March
- The Chimes
- Amor! Possente Nome
- Chorloge Des Tuileries
- La Carnaval de Venise
- Non Piu Mesta
- Reminiscences of Bellini
- Rataplan March
- The Nymphs' Revel
- La Premiere Visite aux Tuileries
- The Last Rose of Summer
- Highland Ballads
- Welsh Bardic Illustrations
- Morceau Fantastique
- Partant Pour Le Syrie
