= Gordon Vereker =

British diplomat (1889–1976)

George Gordon Medlicott Vereker
- Born: 11 December 1889; County Galway, Ireland, United Kingdom
- Died: 14 March 1976 (aged 86); Melbourne, Victoria, Australia
- Years active: 1914-1949

Sir George Gordon Medlicott Vereker (11 December 1889 – 14 March 1976) was a British diplomat.

== Roving diplomat ==
Vereker was born in County Galway, Ireland to a prominent and wealthy Protestant "Ascendancy" family, the son of Sir George Medlicott Vereker and Frances Gore Vereker (née Manders). He was usually known as Gordon instead of George. Vereker was educated at Eton and at Trinity College, Cambridge. Vereker won the Épée title at the 1913 British Fencing Championships.

Vereker served in the British Army in World War One where he awarded the Military Cross and was mentioned in dispatches for heroism under fire. In 1919, he joined the Foreign Office to begin his career as a diplomat. From 1919 to 1923, he was stationed at the British high commission in Cairo, Egypt. From 1923 to 1927, he was stationed at the British legation in Beijing, China and in 1925 was involved in an international incident when he visited with the American explorer Roy Chapman Andrews Urga (modern Ulaanbaatar), the capital of Outer Mongolia. The Communist government of Mongolia accused him of being a spy and expelled him. From 1927 to 1930, he was stationed at the British legation in Budapest, Hungary. On 27 March 1928, he married Marjorie Mulliner in London. After serving at the Foreign Office's headquarters in London in 1930–1932, Vereker served at the British embassies in Warsaw, Poland in 1932-1934 and in Stockholm, Sweden in 1934–1938. The journalist George Bilainkin who visited Vereker's home in Warsaw in 1934 described it as decorated with Hungarian and Chinese art, giving it a very "Oriental" feel.

He served as the charge d'affairs at the British Embassy in Moscow in 1938-39 where he was noted for his hostile views of the Soviet Union. On 16 May 1936, the French ambassador to the Soviet Union, Robert Coulondre met Vereker to talk to him about settling up an Anglo-Franco-Soviet alliance to contain Nazi Germany. Vereker wrote he was "mystified as to the motives of M. Coulondre's invitation, for I have always understood that he is usually reserved and uncommunicative". Vereker told Colondre that his view was that the "Russians were Asiatics...and that with present Byzantine regime in the Kremlin anything might happen", concluding that the Red Army would be no match for the Wehrmacht and there was no point in trying to have the Soviet Union as a counterweight to Germany for that reason. At a Christmas Eve party at the British embassy in 1938, Vereker met with the Soviet foreign commissar, Maxim Litvinov where the discussion turned to the "Ukrainian question" where Litvinov stated about the support extended to the Organization of Ukrainian Nationalists by Germany that the Soviet Union was "not unduly alarmed by the latest German bogey-an independent Ukraine" as the mere "horn blowings" of a handful of Ukrainian nationalists were nothing. Vereker, who tended to sympathize with Ukrainian nationalism, told Litvinov: "I always understood that it was something more than a mere blowing of horns, and that in fact it was nothing less than an earthquake that caused the collapse of the walls of Jericho". On 10 January 1939, Vereker reported to London his belief that the "Ukrainian question is no doubt seriously exercising the mind of the Soviet government". On 13 November 1939, Lawrence Steinhardt, the American ambassador in Moscow, reported that he talked to Vereker who told him that he believed Britain should have broken diplomatic relations with the Soviet Union following the invasion of Finland, but decided not since the last time Britain had broken off relations with Moscow in 1927 had served no purpose.

In late 1939, Vereker was appointed the British minister in La Paz. While leaving the Soviet Union on board an Estonian freighter that was to take across the Baltic Sea, a Kriegsmarine cruiser violated Estonian neutrality by stopping the ship and sending sailors aboard to take Vereker prisoner. The incident, which was a major violation of international law, caused protests around the world and the Germans soon released Vereker.

== Ambassador in Helsinki ==
After briefly serving as the Minister-Plenipotentiary to Bolivia, he served as the British Minister-Plenipotentiary to Finland in 1940–41. Vereker arrived in Helsinki during the Winter War. On 24 February 1940, Vereker had to present his credentials to President Kyösti Kallio during a Red Air Force bombing raid. The meeting was held in the bomb shelter in the Presidential palace. Also attending the meeting was the Finnish foreign minister Väinö Tanner. During his meeting with President Kallio, Vereker promised British support to Finland and spoke of the possibility of 20,000 British soldiers arriving in Finland by April. Vereker stated that about 20,000–25,000 British troops would leave the United Kingdom on 15 March 1940 and would arrive in Finland no later than 15 of April. Vereker also stated that the British forces would go to the southern front in Karelia instead of the northern front above the Arctic Circle. Vereker stated that the British force would be entirely armed with automatic weapons, saying "A battalion would be equal to a regiment". As a landing at Petsamo above the Arctic Circle would be difficult and a journey across Norway and Sweden would be a more expeditious way to reach Finland, Vereker wanted Tanner to pressure the Norwegian and Swedish governments to grant transit rights to the British. Vereker felt that the governments in Oslo and Stockholm would be more be likely to grant transit rights if the appeal came from a fellow Scandinavian power instead of Britain.

In the meantime, Vereker urged the Finns to keep fighting despite the adverse turn in the war and not to make peace with the Soviet Union. The Finnish Commander, Field Marshal Carl Gustaf Emil Mannerheim, advised the cabinet that a force of 20,000–25,000 troops would be too small to affect the outcome of the war and pointed out that both Norway and Sweden were refusing to grant transit rights for Allied forces intended to go to Finland. Mannerheim stated that only 50,000 or more soldiers would be sufficient to affect the outcome of the war, and they needed to arrive immediately. Mannerheim together with the other Finnish generals advised the cabinet to disregard Vereker and make peace with the Soviet Union while it was still possible to make peace, saying the Red Army had broken through the Mannerheim line and to continue the war into April as Vereker wanted might very be the end of Finland as an independent state.

On 27 February 1940, Vereker was informed by London that there were rumors that the Finns had opened peace talks with the Soviets owing to their recent defeats, and he was instructed to find out if this was true or not. On 28 February 1940, Vereker met with Tanner to ask him to continue the war and pressured him into making an appeal for British aid. Tanner admitted that the Finns had opened peace talks via the Swedish government, and through he stated he was moved by the British offer of help, he added that April would be far too late for his nation. Tanner stated that the military situation was dire as the Red Army was advancing into Karelia, and Finland needed to either make peace now or be conquered. Vereker hurt his own credibility by lowering the number of men available, now saying the number of troops sent to Finland would number only 12, 000–13, 000. On 3 March 1940, Vereker again lowered the number of men available, teling Tanner that only 6, 000 British troops would go to Finland. It turned out that the force of 20,000–25,000 that Vereker had promised was not due to instructions he received from London, but was rather an offer he made on his own. Vereker believed that if he promised a larger force, then the Finns would be more likely to make the appeal for British aid, and thus the Norwegian and Swedish governments would be more likely to grant transit rights.

On 4 March 1940, Vereker again met with Tanner to ask him to break off the peace talks and to appeal for British aid, which he again refused to do. On 9 March 1940, the Foreign Secretary, Lord Halifax, instructed Vereker to tell Tanner that Britain was willing to supply 50 Blenheim bombers within the next two weeks and the expeditionary force to aid Finland would be sent as soon as the Arctic ice had melted. However, Lord Halifax, made the aid conditional on Finnish appeal for British help, which the Finns rejected, saying that they needed to make peace now while peace terms could still be had before the Red Army had advanced too far into Finland. On 12 March 1940, the Treaty of Moscow ended the Winter War. In a propaganda move, Vereker suggested that the Foreign Office buy a shipload of South African oranges to present to the Finnish people in recognition of "their superb fight in defense of Western Civilization against the forces of darkness". His idea was rejected under the grounds that the Foreign Office could not afford to be buying oranges in South Africa to hand out for free in Finland.

Despite the Treaty of Moscow, Vereker remained a vocal advocate of British military aid to Finland, warning that "those none too scrupulous gangsters in the Kremlin" might yet set out to conquer the rest of Finland. Vereker wrote: "In Finland we have a potential ally worth at least 10 divisions in any future outflanking attack on the 'West Wall' or any 'pincer' attack on the Soviet Union at a later stage of the war by land, air or sea. Finland's effective military strength should therefore be maintained". Vereker also suggested that British naval forces enter the Baltic Sea to occupy the Swedish island of Fårö to establish a naval base to support Finland, a suggestion that was immediately shot down in London at a meeting on 21 March 1940 under the grounds that if British forces entered the Baltic, Germany would occupy Denmark and mine the Danish Straits that linked the Baltic to the North Sea, thereby cutting them off. Laurence Collier, the head of Northern Department of the Foreign Office rejected Vereker's plan to supply arms to Finland, stating he "doubted whether the Germans will give allow the Russians to give us a fresh opportunity for intervention in Scandinavia" and was against shipping arms to Finland on the "off-chance of this happening".

For the rest of 1940, Vereker was involved in a struggle against the German embassy in Helsinki in an effort to influence Finnish public opinion. Vereker founded a newspaper, The Review of the British Press, consisting of various newspaper articles from various British "quality" newspapers translated into Finnish and Swedish. In the summer of 1940, Vereker claimed success in his dispatches to London, saying that the Finnish middle classes were becoming more pro-British and less convinced of the possibility of a German "final victory". Vereker also reported that German propaganda in Finland was unconvincing, making such claims that the Royal Family had fled Britain to Canada, which he rebutted by publishing photos showing that King George VI, Queen Elizabeth, and their two daughters, Princess Elizabeth and Princess Margaret were still living in London.

A major concern for Vereker was maintaining the concession signed in 1934 to mine nickel at Petsamo (modern Pechengsky, Russia) to the Petsamo Nickel Company. The Petsamo Nickel Company was owned by an Anglo-Canadian concern consisting of the Mond Nickel Company of London and International Nickel Company of Toronto. As Petsamo is one of the richest nickel mines in the world, both the Soviet and German governments pressured the Finnish government to transfer control of the mine to them. Vereker sympathised with the Finnish government, but warned that Britain expected Finland to honor the concession and made it clear that he did not want any of the nickel from Petsamo to go to Germany. Vereker stated that if the Finns felt compelled to nationalise the mine, he would much prefer the nickel to go to the Soviet Union rather than Germany. By the end of 1940, the Finns had not revoked the mining concession, saying they needed more time to study the legal implications of breaking the 40 year concession signed in 1934. British influence in Finland was weakened by the fact that the 50 promised Bristol Blenheim bombers never arrived with the British explanation that the bombers were needed for the strategic bombing offensive against Germany. The Finnish historian Markku Ruotsila described Anglo-Finnish relations in 1940-41 as a dialogue des sourds as Finnish foreign policy after the Treaty of Moscow was governed by the desire to take back the lost lands, and the Finns assumed that the British shared that goal, whereas the British were primarily concerned with winning the war against Germany. The new British prime minister, Winston Churchill, had taken an extreme anti-Communist line during the Russian Civil War, advocating as War Secretary that Britain intervene with troops on the White side and more recently as First Lord of the Admiralty during the Winter War advocated British intervention on the side of Finland. Given Churchill's past views, the Finns assumed that Churchill's politics were fundamentally anti-Soviet and he shared their obsession with undoing the territorial losses imposed by the Treaty of Moscow.

Vereker's dispatches from Helsinki tended be very pro-Finnish and to put all Finnish actions in the best possible light. When Finland granted transit rights for German forces, Vereker downplayed the significance of this, saying that a prominent Helsinki society lady had told she was "sleeping easier now with Germans in Finland instead of Russians". Vereker's obvious affection and sympathy for Finland together with his ingrained hostility to the Soviet Union led many Finnish officials to assume that his views represented British policy. On 25 June 1941, Finland declared war on the Soviet Union, and on the same day, Finnish troops together with German troops based in Finland entered the Soviet Union. Operation Barbarossa completely changed the nature of Anglo-Soviet relations and with it Anglo-Finnish relations. As Britain lacked the strength to defeat Germany on its own, the British needed the Soviet Union more than the Soviet Union needed Britain to win the war. Moreover, 3 million German troops organised in three army groups had invaded the Soviet Union on 22 June 1941. As the British and Commonwealth forces were having much difficulty defending Egypt against one German corps, namely the Afrika Corps, from the British perspective it was imperative to keep the Soviet Union fighting as the Red Army was taking on the bulk of the Wehrmacht and preventing 3 million German troops from being sent to North Africa.

Churchill, for all his anti-communism was not prepared to sacrifice the new, if awkward alliance with the Soviet Union for the sake of Finland, an aspect of British strategy that the Finns did not understand very well. British supplies of weapons to the Soviet Union were delivered via the highly dangerous "Murmansk run" through the Arctic Ocean to the Soviet ports of Murmansk and Archangel. In August 1941 German forces based in Finland started to advance across the Arctic tundra towards Murmansk and Archangel while German aircraft based in Finland attacked the British merchantmen on the "Murmansk run". Churchill's main fear was that the Soviet Union might make a separate peace with Germany, and even through the losses on the "Murmansk run" were heavy while the amount of aid delivered was small, he was determined to keep the "Murmansk run" going as a way to prove that Britain was committed to its new alliance with the Soviet Union. The fact that Finland was allied to Germany and assisting the Reich with its efforts to sever the "Murmansk run" caused Anglo-Finnish relations to go into a rapid decline in the summer of 1941. In September 1941, Finland broke off diplomatic relations with Great Britain under German pressure owing to the Continuation War. In his last dispatch from Helsinki, Vereker wrote "the Finnish people were in favour of continuing the war against the Soviet Union", and there was nothing that could have been done to stop the Finnish government from joining Operation Barbarossa.

== Ambassador in Montevideo ==
From 1943, he was appointed as the Minister-Plenipotentiary to Uruguay. In 1944, Britain and Uruguay agreed to upgrade their relations from the legation level to the embassy level, and Vereker became the first British ambassador to Uruguay. Uruguay had close economic relations with Argentina, and during the Second World War, the United Kingdom and even more so, the United States had difficult relations with Argentina owing to that nation's pro-Axis neutrality. On 23 March 1944, the Uruguayan foreign minister José Serrato told Vereker about his government's concern about the "hostile" and "clumsy" American attitude towards Argentina. Serrato asked for the end of "the diplomatic blockade" of Argentina, saying it was a mistake "to hide our light behind a bush, not having a defined policy towards Argentina".

In 1944, Vereker was involved in blocking an American plan to exchange the Germans interned in Uruguay for European Jews who held Uruguayan passports, an effort which floundered over the inability to determine which Germans held in Uruguay would be of no value to the war effort, and the fear of the Foreign Secretary, Anthony Eden, that the Jews released go to Palestine instead of Uruguay. On 15 November 1944, Eden wrote to Vereker: "Most of the holders of these documents (Latin American passports) are of the Jewish race who have been accepted as immigrants to Palestine". Vereker wrote back to Eden about the interned Germans: "All of them are capable of rendering services to Germany if in that country. Many have qualities that would render them of considerable value to Germany. For instance, it seems absurd to suggest sending to Germany highly trained employees of the German banks who otherwise are languishing here doing nothing but draw their pay. Any such action would certainly be misunderstood and give rise to all sorts of ideas that we have gone all soft and sentimental over the Germans." In 1945, Lord Halifax, who was now serving as the British ambassador to the United States, sent Vereker a note saying the American plan was "of academic interest". In 1945, Vereke's first marriage ended and on 17 February 1945 he married an American socialite, Roxane Bowen. On 11 August 1947, in a public letter Vereker thanked Alberto Guani, the Uruguayan foreign minister in 1939, for interning the crew of the Admiral Graf von Spree after the Battle of the Rio Plate. 1948, King George VI appointed him a Knight Commander, Order of St. Michael and St. George. After his retirement from the diplomatic corps, he moved to Australia where he died.
