= Alfred Chatterton =

British civil servant and engineer in India

Sir Alfred Chatterton CIE (10 October 1866 – 26 July 1958) was a British civil servant and civil engineer who worked in India and served as the first director of industries for the Madras Presidency (1900-1908) and as director of industries and commerce in Mysore (1908-1912).

Chatterton was educated at Finsbury Technical College and then at the Central Institution, South Kensington. He went to India after qualifying for the Indian Education Service and worked in Madras from 1888 to 1900. He joined the Indian Educational Service and was a Professor of Engineering, in Madras, from 1888 to 1900. He then advised the government on industrial development and then moved to the Mysore State where he was involved in the founding of the Sandalwood oil distillation industry in Bangalore. He advised the Mysore Durbar in 1918 and was involved in helping set up the Tata Industrial Bank. He was awarded a Kaiser-i-Hind medal in 1901, made CIE in 1912 and knighted in 1919.

He wrote an article in Madras Mail dated 13th January 1921 on hand-loom weaving industry.
