= Eric Ralph Lingeman =

British diplomat

Eric Ralph Lingeman CBE (19 June 1898 – 4 January 1966) was a British diplomat. He was Ambassador to Afghanistan from 1951 to 1953, and Ambassador to Uruguay from 1953 to 1955.

He was appointed a CBE in 1947.
