= United Kingdom–Uruguay relations =

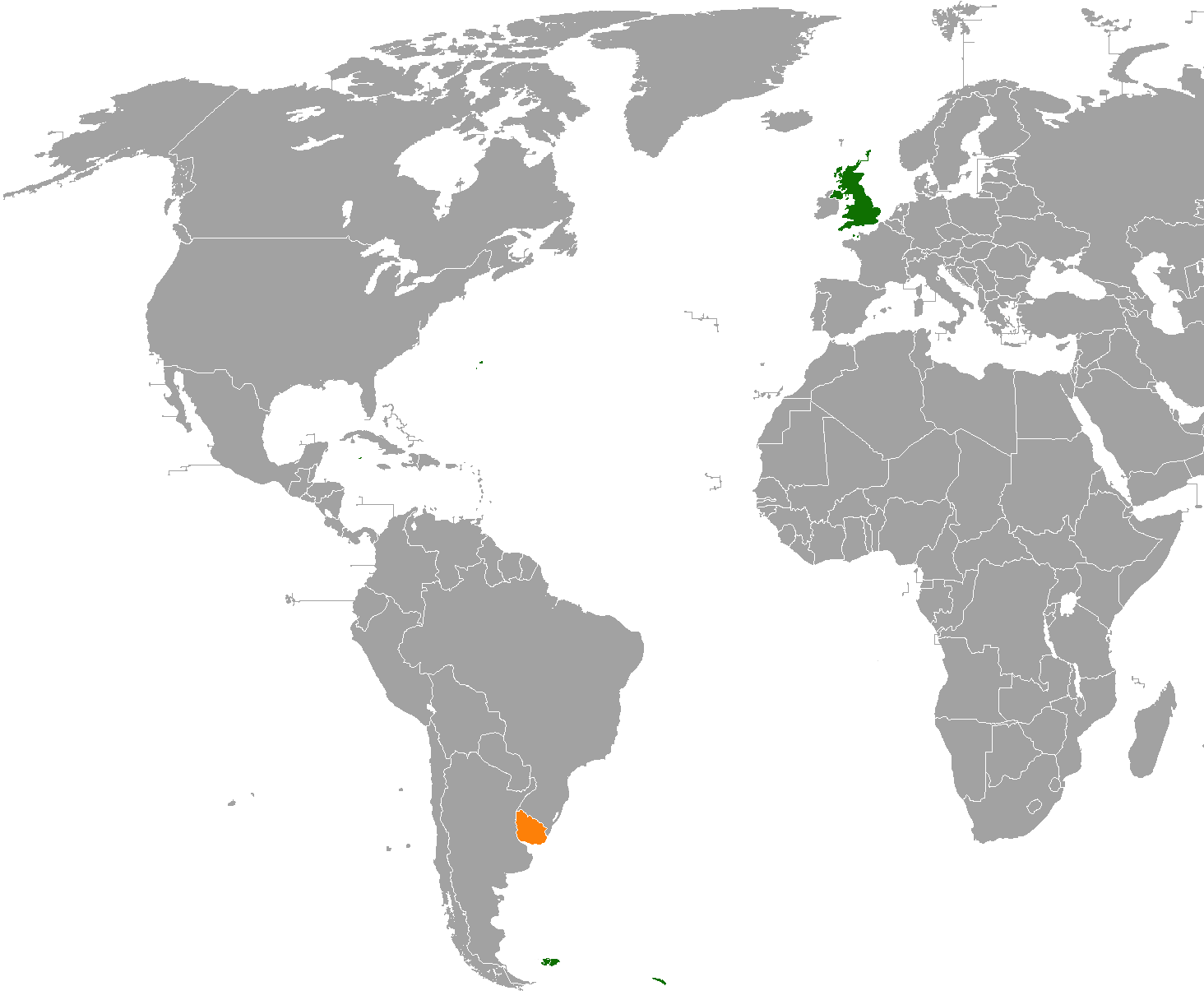

- United Kingdom: Uruguay

Diplomatic mission
- Embassy of the United Kingdom, Montevideo: Embassy of Uruguay, London

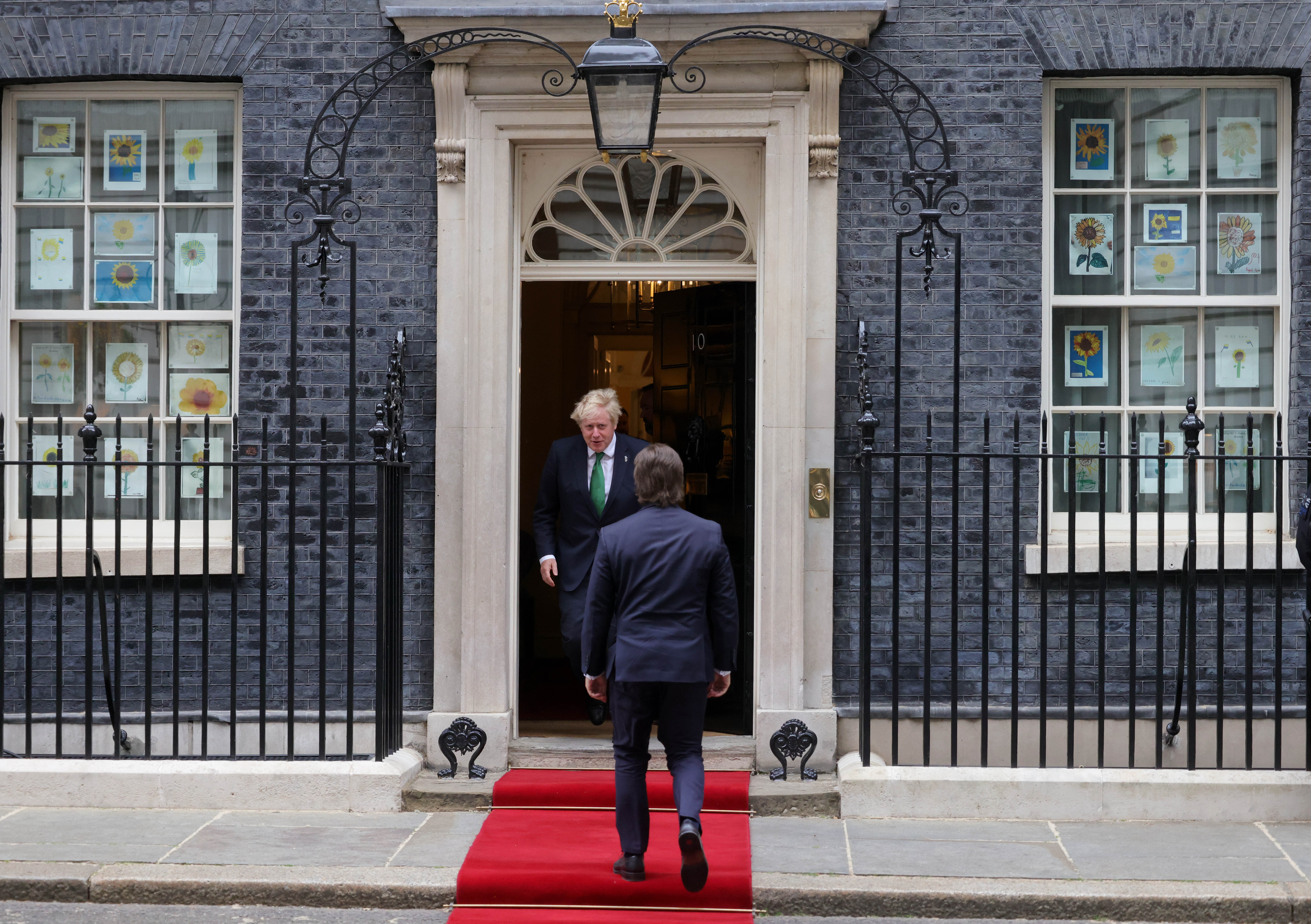
British Prime Minister Boris Johnson with Uruguayan President Luis Lacalle Pou in 10 Downing Street, May 2022.

United Kingdom–Uruguay relations are the foreign and bilateral relations between the Oriental Republic of Uruguay and the United Kingdom of Great Britain and Northern Ireland. The two countries established diplomatic relations on 21 February 1833.

Both countries share common membership of the Atlantic Co-operation Pact, the International Criminal Court, the United Nations, the World Health Organization, and the World Trade Organization. Bilaterally the two countries have an Investment Agreement.

== History ==
=== Colonial era ===
During the colonial period, the territory of present-day Uruguay was invaded by British forces. Following their victory at the Battle of Cardal, British troops established a brief siege of the city of Montevideo. In the subsequent years, the region experienced a period of political and military instability, marked by the Oriental Revolution and the invasion of the territory by the Empire of Brazil after the declaration of independence in 1825, which led to the Cisplatine War. The United Kingdom later acted as a diplomatic mediator in the conflict, under the leadership of Lord John Ponsonby as envoy. His mediation resulted in the signing of the Preliminary Peace Convention in 1828, which enabled the establishment of the Oriental State of Uruguay.

=== Post-independence period and British involvement ===
During the presidency of Manuel Oribe, Uruguay sought to formalize its relations with the United Kingdom through diplomatic negotiations. Juan Francisco Giró served as a confidential agent in London, where he took part in talks aimed at concluding a treaty of friendship, commerce and navigation, as well as securing a foreign loan. However, the negotiations ultimately failed, as the conditions proposed by the British government—particularly extensive commercial concessions and long-term political commitments—were deemed unacceptable by the Uruguayan authorities, who formally rejected the agreement in January 1835.

British involvement in Uruguayan affairs became more pronounced during the Uruguayan Civil War. In this context, the United Kingdom supported the Gobierno de la Defensa, based in Montevideo and aligned with the Colorado faction that had emerged under the leadership of Fructuoso Rivera.

From the mid- to late 19th century, Britain played a key role in Uruguay’s trade, finance and infrastructure sectors, exerting significant influence over the country’s modernization and early industrial development. British-owned companies operated in strategic sectors of the economy, most notably railways, telegraph services, tramways, and the water supply. By the mid-1870s, British capital in Uruguay was focused primarily on public debt and railways, with more limited investments in land, livestock, public utilities, industry, banking, and real estate. As a result of this sustained economic and financial presence, Uruguay has often been described by historians as an informal colony of the British Empire.

Beginning in the 1880s, immigration from the British Isles to Uruguay increased. Many of these immigrants settled in rural areas, where they established estancias, introduced pedigree livestock, and promoted agricultural and livestock activities closely linked to British-owned enterprises. This process led to the development of settlements associated with these economic activities, including Conchillas and Barker in the department of Colonia, and San Jorge in the department of Durazno. In Montevideo, the Central Uruguay Railway Company also sponsored the construction of a planned residential area in the Peñarol area, then known as Nuevo Manchester (Spanish for 'New Manchester'), featuring Victorian-style housing for railway workers, most of whom were English and Irish immigrants of working-class origin.

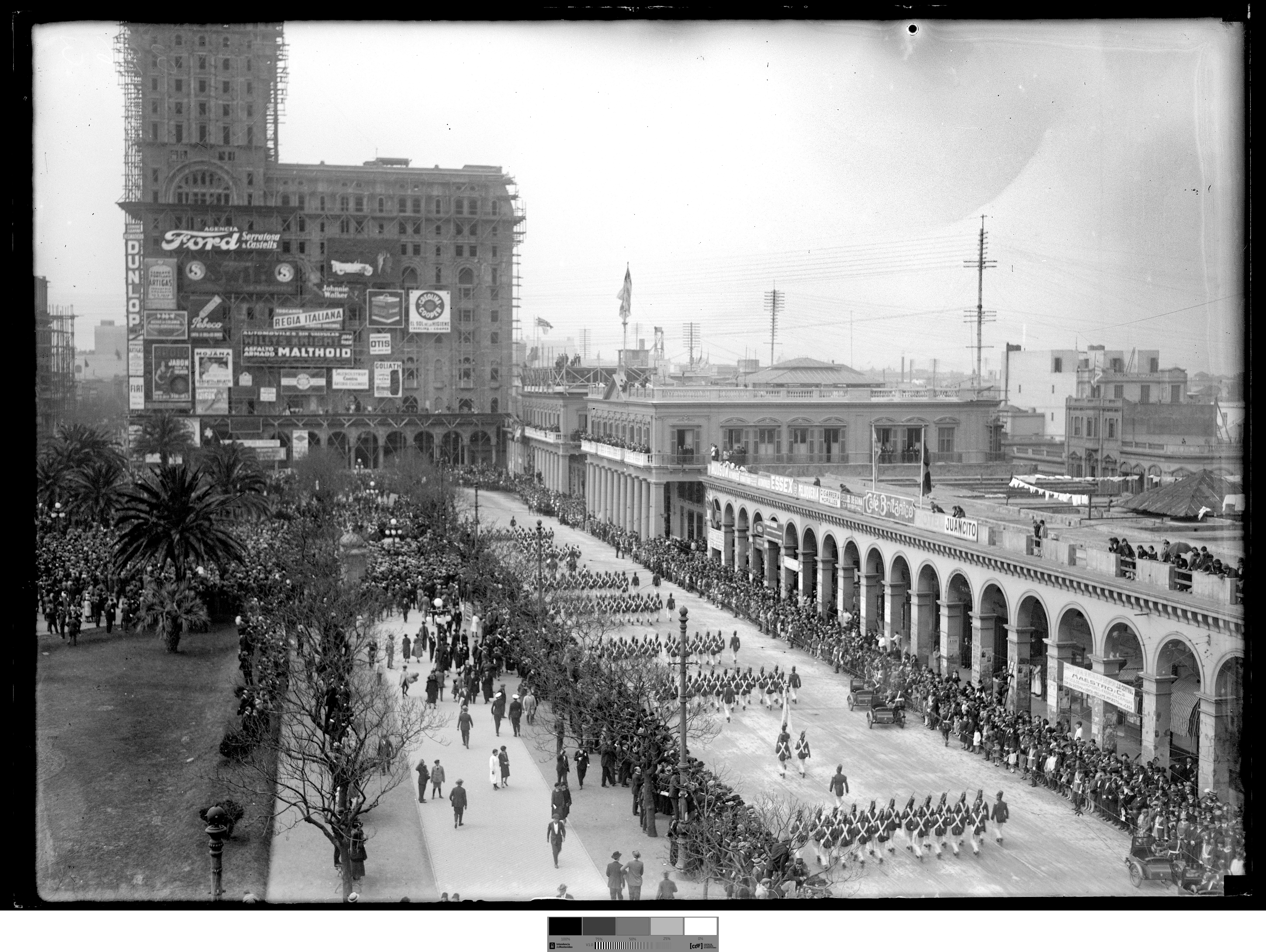
Military parade held in Plaza Independencia during the visit of the Prince of Wales, August 1925.

During the Batlle era, which began in 1903, the Uruguayan state increasingly challenged British dominance in public utilities. Batllism’s economic policy, grounded in nationalization and state ownership, was guided by the belief that certain essential services should be provided by the state in order to safeguard the common good. During this period, key sectors were brought under public control and state-owned enterprises were created to deliver specific services. During World War I, Uruguay remained officially neutral, although it displayed pro-British sympathies, until 1917, when it severed diplomatic relations with the German Empire and Austria-Hungary. In August 1925, the Prince of Wales—later King Edward VIII—paid an official visit to Uruguay, during which he stayed at the Taranco Palace and visited the Expo Prado and the Legislative Palace, shortly before its official inauguration.

=== World War II and the Battle of the River Plate ===
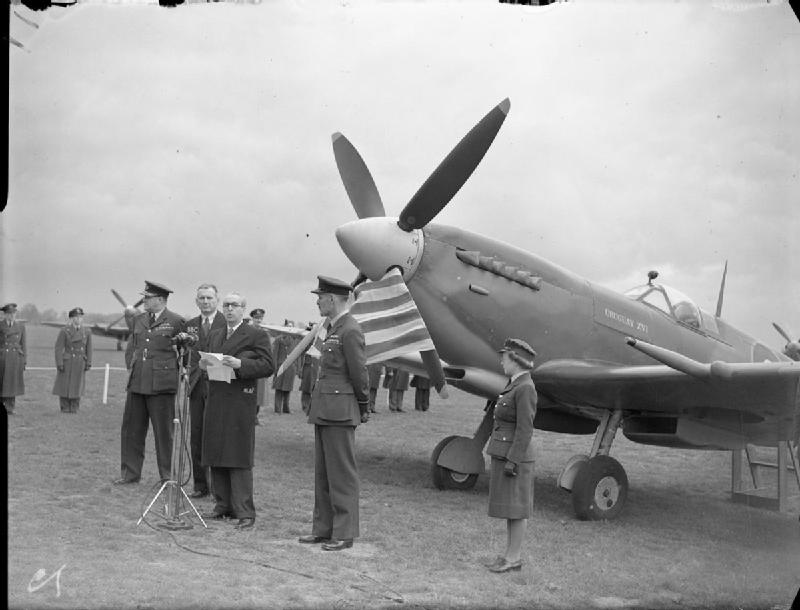
Launch ceremony for a Royal Air Force Spitfire fighter donated by Uruguay, 1943.

With the outbreak of World War II, Uruguayan president Alfredo Baldomir Ferrari declared the country’s neutrality. Despite this, his administration pursued policies broadly aligned with British interests. Baldomir used his veto power to block proposals to nationalize certain foreign-owned companies—primarily British—and ensured that meat exports were directed preferentially toward the United Kingdom.

On 13 December 1939, the Battle of the River Plate took place off the coast of Punta del Este, marking the first naval engagement between British and German forces of World War II and the only battle of the conflict fought in South America. In the aftermath of the engagement, the damaged German heavy cruiser Admiral Graf Spee sought refuge in the port of Montevideo. Its presence there triggered diplomatic negotiations, particularly involving the United Kingdom, whose efforts were led by Minister Eugen Millington-Drake and focused on restricting the ship’s length of stay in the bay. Faced with these circumstances, Captain Hans Langsdorff ordered the scuttling of the Admiral Graf Spee off the coast of Montevideo on 17 December 1939. Following the episode, sailors from HMS Ajax, one of the British vessels involved in the battle, were publicly received in Plaza Independencia in Montevideo.

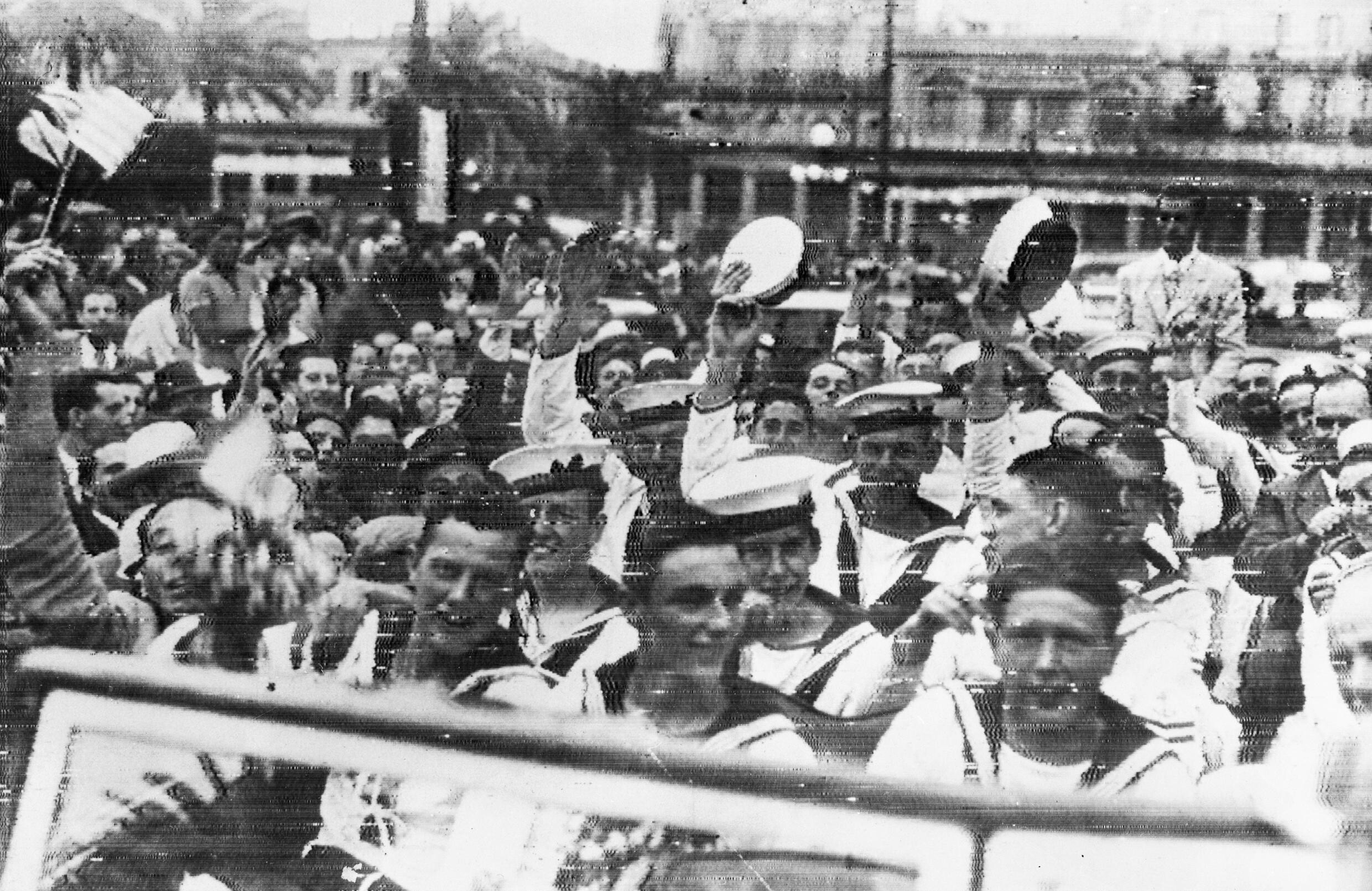
Royal Navy sailors from HMS Ajax being welcomed at Plaza Independencia in Montevideo following the Battle of the River Plate.

During the war, Uruguay became an important supplier of food to the Allied forces, particularly through the production of corned beef at the Frigorífico Anglo del Uruguay in Fray Bentos. Operating since 1865 under the British firm Liebig’s Extract of Meat Company—renamed Anglo in 1924—the plant developed into a large-scale center for the production of preserved meat and earned the nickname “the kitchen of the world.”

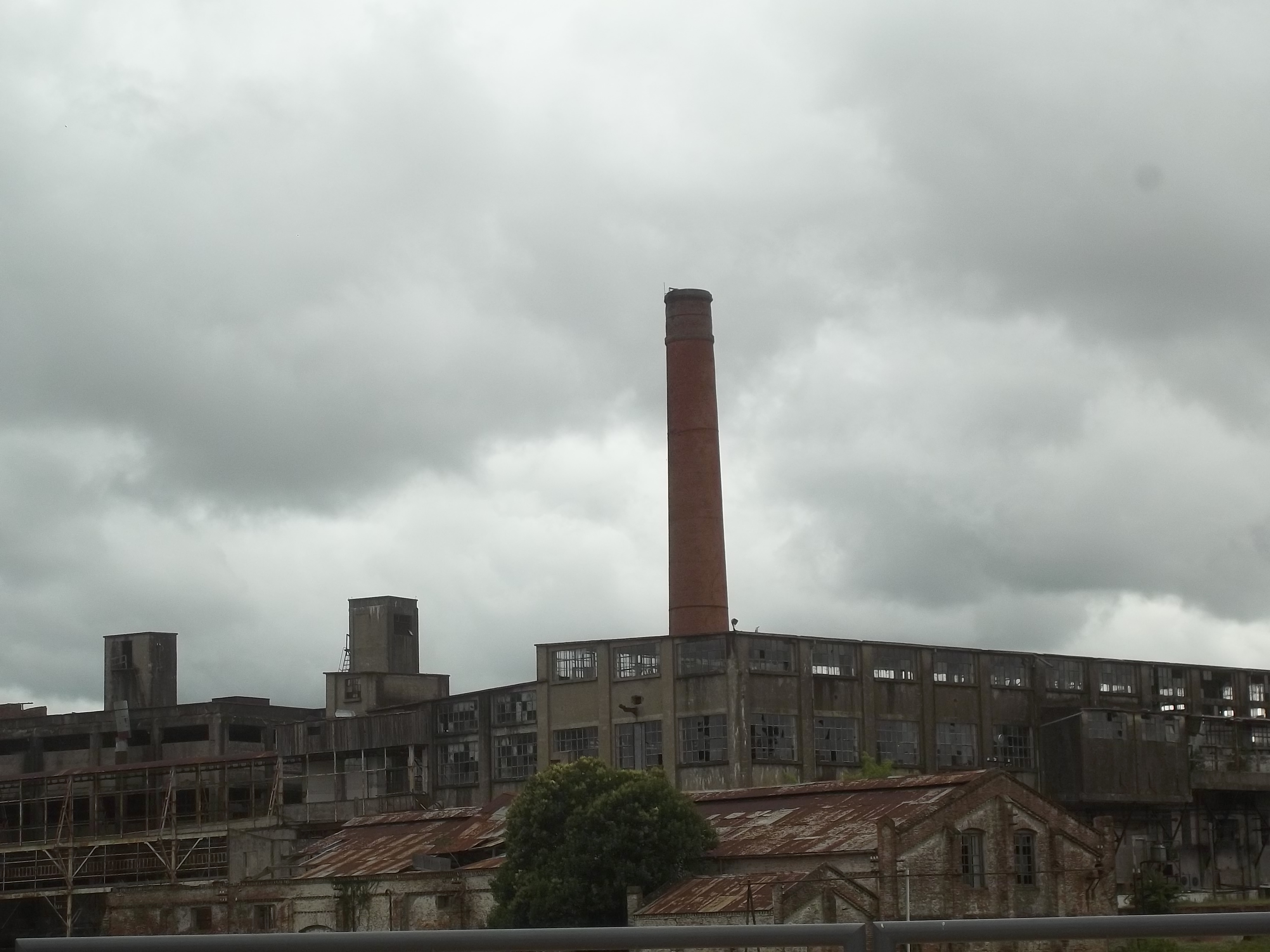
Frigorífico Anglo del Uruguay

As a result of wartime trade, the United Kingdom accumulated a substantial debt to Uruguay, amounting to approximately £17.5 million. In 1947, both countries negotiated the Anglo-Uruguayan Payments Agreement, which brought to an end the privileged economic relationship that had existed since the late 19th century. Unable to settle the debt in cash, the British Treasury agreed to transfer part of the funds to a freely available account for the Uruguayan state, while the remaining balance was cleared through the transfer of ownership of British-owned public utility companies, including those operating railways, water supply, and tramway services.

In 2022, UK Prime Minister Boris Johnson invited Uruguayan President Luis Lacalle Pou to talks at Downing Street. The two met on May 23 and discussed deepening trade ties and removing trade barriers, as well as Russia's illegal invasion of Ukraine. They also discussed security ties.

== Diplomatic missions ==
- Uruguay maintains an embassy in London.
- The United Kingdom is accredited to Uruguay through its embassy in Montevideo.

== See also ==
- British Uruguayan
- Foreign relations of the United Kingdom
- Foreign relations of Uruguay
- Uruguayans in the United Kingdom
