= Claude Mallet =

British diplomat (1860–1941)

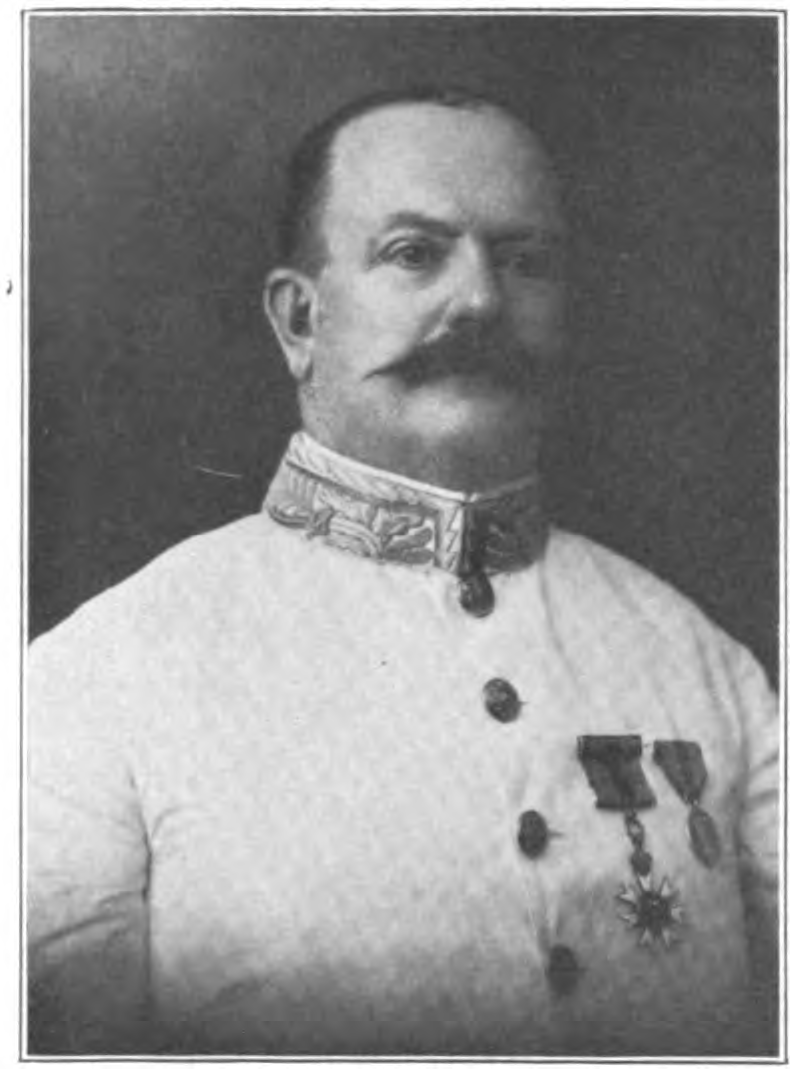

Sir Claude Coventry Mallet, CMG (20 April 1860 – 25 April 1941) was a British diplomat. He was British Minister to Panama, Costa Rica, and Uruguay.
