= Department of Overseas Trade (United Kingdom) =

The Department of Overseas Trade was formed on 21 March 1918 by the Foreign Office and the Board of Trade to control commercial representatives and services abroad and to collate and disseminate overseas commercial intelligence. It was headed by the Parliamentary Secretary for Overseas Trade. The department existed until 20 March 1946, when its responsibilities were transferred to the newly formed Export Promotion Department of the Board of Trade.

== Export Credits scheme ==
The Department of Overseas Trade administered an Export Credit scheme, which authorised the British government to guarantee transactions to stimulate foreign trade. After the Genoa Conference in 1922, this scheme was applied to the Soviet Union.
