= Eugen Millington-Drake =

British diplomat (1889–1972)

Sir Eugen Millington-Drake KCMG
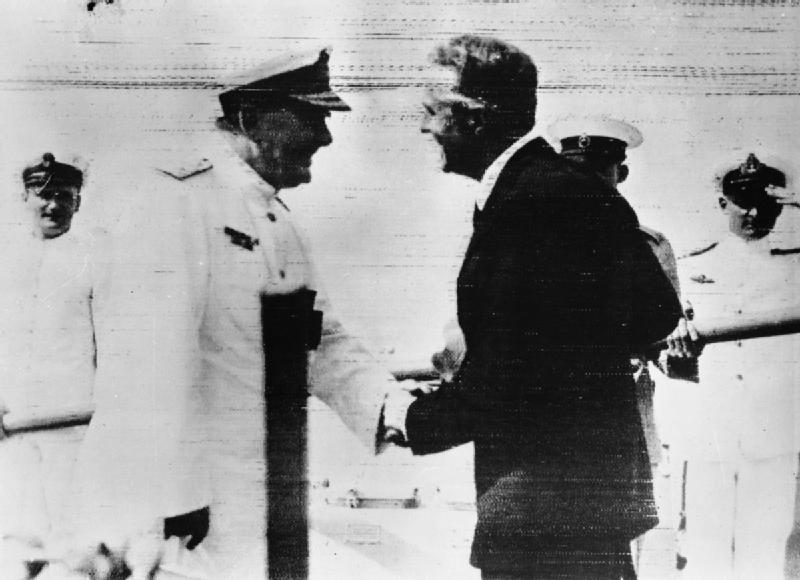
- Millington-Drake (right) greets Rear-Admiral Sir Henry Harwood in Montevideo after the Battle of the River Plate, 3 January 1940
- Born: John Henry Eugen Vanderstegen Millington; 26 February 1889; Paris, France
- Died: 12 December 1972 (aged 83)
- Education: Eton College
- Alma mater: Magdalen College, Oxford
- Occupation: Diplomat
- Spouse: Lady Effie Mackay (m. 1920)
- Children: 4, including Teddy

Sir John Henry Eugen Vanderstegen Millington-Drake, KCMG (26 February 1889 – 12 December 1972) was a British diplomat.

== Origins ==
Eugen Millington-Drake was born on 26 February 1889 to Henry Drake (born 1859), and Ellen Grangor Millington (married 1888). His father changed his name to Henry Millington-Drake in 1900. His grandfather was John Vanderstegen Drake, which explains his full name. Eugen was born in Paris, yet a British subject through parentage. He was educated at Eton College, an all-boys independent boarding school in Berkshire, England. He then went on to study at Magdalen College, Oxford, where he rowed in the winning 1911 Boat Race crew.

== Diplomatic career ==
In 1912 he entered the Diplomatic Service and his posts included St. Petersburg (1913); Buenos Aires (1915); at the Paris Peace Delegation and Embassy (1919–1920); First Secretary and Chargé d'Affaires at Bucharest (1921–1924); Brussels (1924–1927); Copenhagen (1927–1928); Counsellor of Embassy, and Buenos Aires (1929–1933).

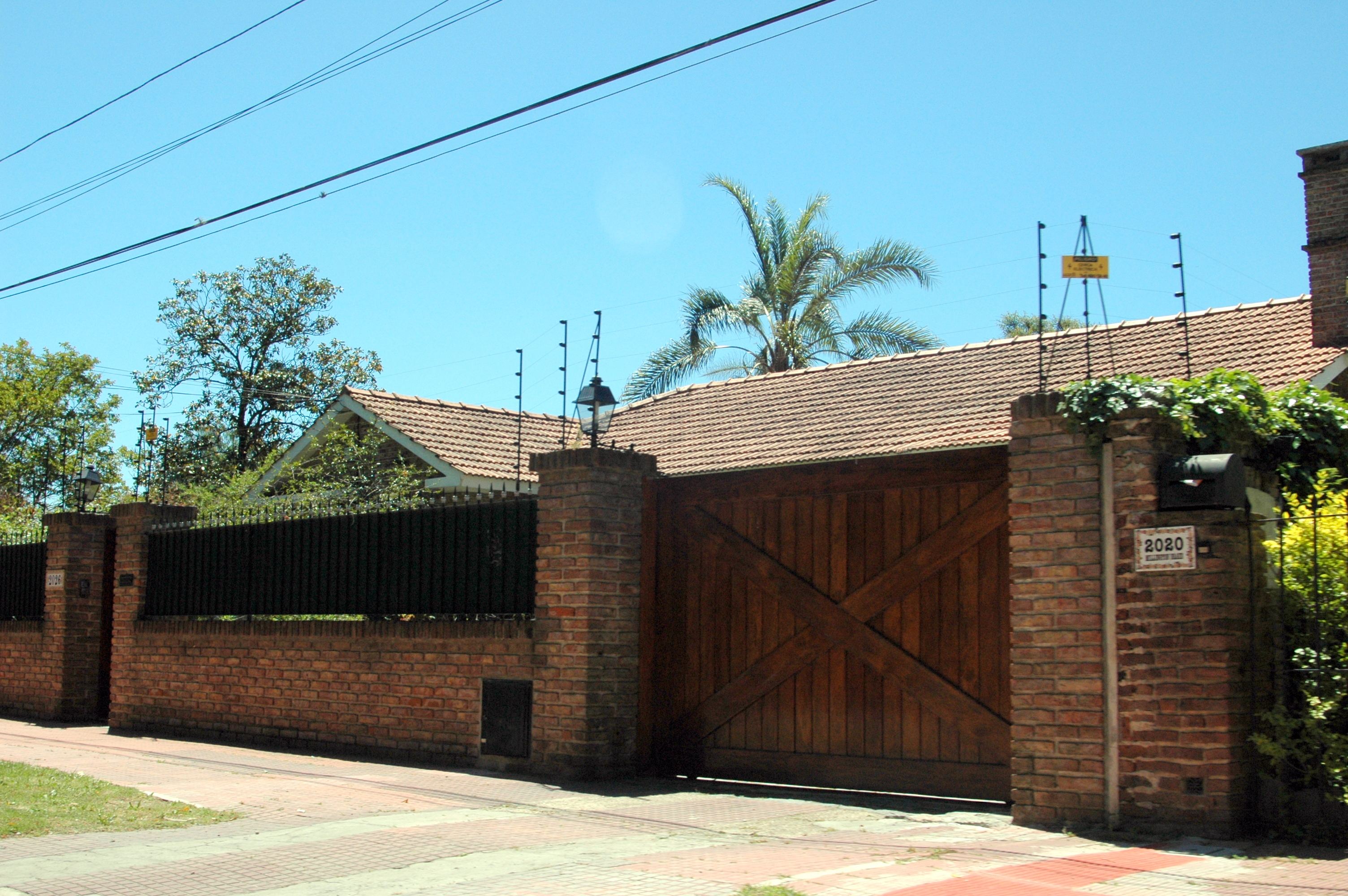
Casa de Carrasco vista desde Calle Sir Eugen Millington Drake

=== Service in Uruguay and the Battle of the River Plate ===
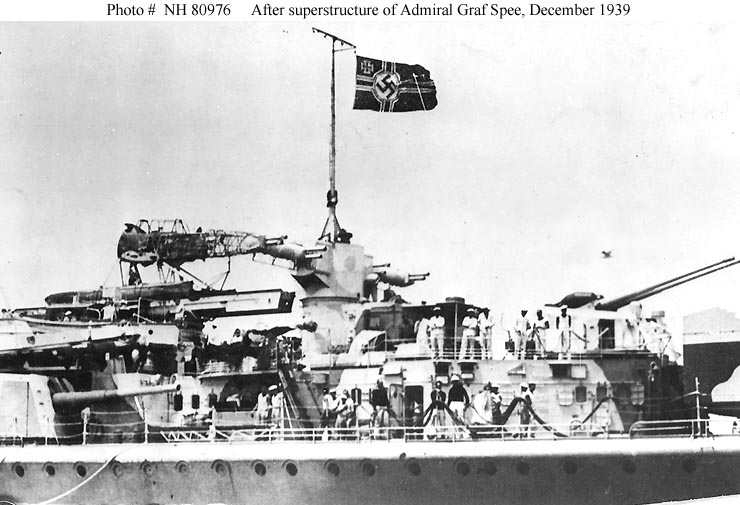
Admiral Graf Spee (German Armored Ship, 1936) View of the after part of the ship's superstructure, port side, taken while she was in Montevideo harbor, Uruguay in mid-December 1939, following the Battle of the River Plate. Note the burned-out remains of an Arado Ar 196A-1 floatplane on the ship's catapult and the German naval ensign flying from the mast mounted atop the after rangefinder.

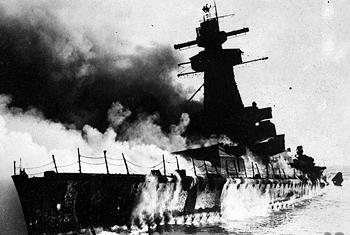
Graf Spee in flames after being scuttled

He subsequently became Minister to Uruguay (1934–1941). In 1936 he was the Honorary President of Uruguayan Delegation to the 1936 Summer Olympics. In 1939 he played a pivotal, behind-the scenes role in the Battle of the River Plate. (In the 1956 British war film The Battle of the River Plate he is played by the actor Anthony Bushell, and is portrayed as a well dressed and accomplished diplomat.)

=== Later roles ===
He was seconded from the Foreign Office as Chief Representative of the British Council in Spanish America, 1942–1946. In 1948 he was Chairman of the Reception Committee of XIV Olympiad in London. He was vice-president of the Council of the Royal India, Pakistan and Ceylon Society, visiting the East on cultural missions, 1949–1950. In 1952 and 1953 he undertook lecture tours of Africa, Madagascar, Mauritius and Réunion.

== Marriage & issue ==
In 1920 (registration as John H E V Millington-Drake) he married Lady Effie Mackay (born 1895), a younger daughter of the Scottish banker and shipping magnate, the 1st Earl of Inchcape, with whom in his later life he lived in Rome. By his wife he had four children:

- Jean Ellen Millington-Drake (1922–1960) ("Nellie"), eldest daughter, who married firstly in 1944 Rear-Admiral Richard Arthur Hawkesworth, RN, and having obtained a divorce in 1948 remarried in that year to Ruggero Spano.
- Marie Regina Millington-Drake (Duchess of Carcaci), an adventurous traveller, who whilst living in Cyprus (where she built Villa Fortuna at Ayios Epiktitos, now known as Villa Firtina and used as the Turkish Ambassador's summer residence) had been the lover of the author Lawrence Durrell and had featured (as "Marie") in his auto-biographical novel Bitter Lemons (1957) and later (as "Martine") in his Sicilian Carousel (1977), largely a tribute to her. She left Cyprus for Sicily and married Gaetano Paternò-Castello, Duke of Carcaci in Sicily, and lived at Naxos, near Taormina, with issue.
- James Mackay Millington-Drake, who married Manon Redvers-Bate, with issue;
- Edgar Louis Mackay Vanderstegen Millington-Drake (1932–1994), Artist, known as "Teddy", youngest child, Died unmarried.

== Legacy ==
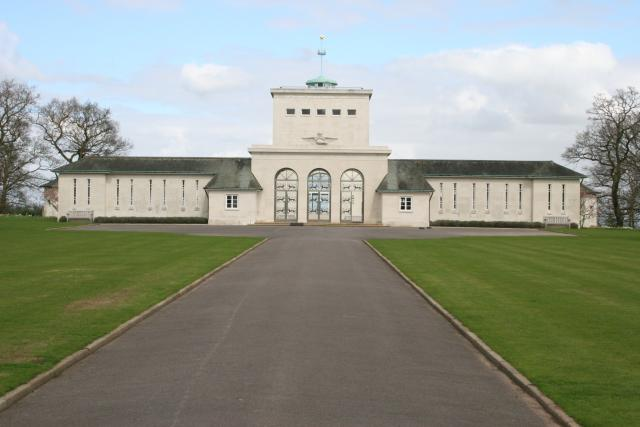
Air Forces Memorial at Runnymede, Surrey

The papers of Sir Eugen Millington-Drake are housed at the Churchill Archives Centre, Churchill College, University of Cambridge, UK.

Land for the Air Forces Memorial at Runnymede, Surrey was donated by Sir Eugen and Lady Effie Millington-Drake in 1949.

In 1962, Sir Eugen endowed the Rommelpreis, a marksmanship prize of the German Bundeswehr (Army) named in honour of the World War 2 General Erwin Rommel.

== See also ==
- President Alfredo Baldomir
