= 1963 New Year Honours =

British royal recognitions

The New Year Honours 1963 were appointments in many of the Commonwealth realms of Queen Elizabeth II to various orders and honours to reward and highlight good works by citizens of those countries. They were announced in supplements to The London Gazette of 28 December 1962 to celebrate the year passed and mark the beginning of 1963.

At this time honours for Australians were awarded both in the United Kingdom honours, on the advice of the premiers of Australian states, and also in a separate Australia honours list.

The recipients of honours are displayed here as they were styled before their new honour, and arranged by honour, with classes (Knight, Knight Grand Cross, etc.) and then divisions (Military, Civil, etc.) as appropriate.

== United Kingdom and Commonwealth ==
=== Earl ===
- The Right Honourable Albert Victor, Viscount Alexander of Hillsborough, CH. Member of Parliament for the Hillsborough Division of Sheffield, 1922–1931 and 1935–1950. Parliamentary Secretary, Board of Trade, 1924; First Lord of the Admiralty, 1929–1931, 1940–1945 and 1945–1946; Minister of Defence, 1946–1950; Chancellor of the Duchy of Lancaster, 1950–1951. Leader of the Labour Peers in the House of Lords since 1955. For political and public services.

=== Baron ===
- The Right Honourable Sir Norman Craven Brook, GCB. Lately Secretary of the Cabinet and Joint Permanent Secretary to HM Treasury and Head of the Home Civil Service.
- Sir Malcolm Trustram Eve, Bt., GBE, MC, TD, QC. For public services. Lately First Crown Estate Commissioner.

=== Life Peer ===
Baron

- Sir Eric Cyril Boyd Edwards, MC, TD. For political services.

=== Privy Councillor ===
- Sir David Callender Campbell, KBE, CMG, MP. Member of Parliament for Belfast South since 1952. Chairman, Ulster Unionist Group in the House of Commons since 1955. Lieutenant-Governor of Malta, 1943–1952.

=== Baronet ===
- Sir Arthur Espie Porritt, KCMG, KCVO, CBE, MCh, FRCS, President, Royal College of Surgeons.
- William Johnson Taylor, CBE, MP, Member of Parliament for Bradford North since 1950. Parliamentary Secretary, Ministry of Supply, 1957–1959; Parliamentary Under-Secretary of State for Air, 1959–1962. For political and public services.
- Kenneth Pugh Thompson, MP, Member of Parliament for the Walton Division of Liverpool since 1950. Assistant Postmaster-General, 1957–1959; Parliamentary Secretary, Ministry of Education, 1959–1962. For political and public services.
- Richard Hilton Marler Thompson, MP, Member of Parliament for Croydon West, 1950–1955, and for Croydon South since 1955. An Assistant Government Whip, 1952–1954; a Lord Commissioner of HM Treasury, 1954–1956; Vice-Chamberlain of HM Household, 1956–1957; Parliamentary Secretary, Ministry of Health, 1957–1959; Parliamentary Under-secretary of State, Commonwealth Relations Office, 1959–1960; Parliamentary Secretary, Ministry of Works, 1960–1962. For political and public services.

=== Knight Bachelor ===
- William Henry Arnold, CBE, The Bailiff, Guernsey.
- Richard Frank Bonallack, CBE. For political services in Middlesex and Essex.
- Kenneth Granville Bradley, CMG, Director of the Commonwealth Institute.
- William John Carron. President, Amalgamated Engineering Union.
- James Wilfred Cook. For services to Organic Chemistry. Vice-chancellor, University of Exeter.
- Alderman Jonathan Lionel Percy Denny, MC. Lately Sheriff, City of London.
- Ian Fraser, DSO, OBE, MD, FRCS, DL, Senior Consultant Surgeon, Royal Victoria Hospital, Belfast.
- Herbert James Gunn. Portrait Painter.
- Cyril Ernest Harrison. Vice Chairman and Managing Director, English Sewing Cotton Company. Ltd.
- Walter Stewart Howard, MBE, DL, Alderman, Warwickshire County Council.
- Edmund Peder Hudson. Lately Managing Director, Scottish Agricultural Industries, Ltd.
- Alderman Frederick Lawrence, OBE, JP. For political and public services in London.
- Frederick Geoffrey Lawrence, QC. Lately Chairman, General Council of the Bar.
- William Lindsay, CBE. For political and public services in Sussex.
- Peter George Macdonald, JP. For political and public services in Edinburgh.
- Harold Hill Mullens, Chairman, C. A. Parsons & Co. Ltd. and A. Reyrolle & Co. Ltd.
- Roger Aubrey Baskerville Mynors, Corpus Christi Professor of Latin Language and Literature, University of Oxford.
- Gerald David Nunes Nabarro, MP, Member of Parliament for Kidderminster since 1950. For political and public services.
- James Denning Pearson, Chief Executive and Deputy Chairman, Rolls-Royce Ltd.
- Montague Arnet Robinson, Chairman, Mersey Docks and Harbour Board.
- Harold George Sanders, Chief Scientific Adviser, Ministry of Agriculture, Fisheries and Food.
- Thomas Holmes Sellors, DM, FRCS, Surgeon, Middlesex Hospital and the National Heart Hospital.
- Henry Francis Spencer, Managing Director, Richard Thomas and Baldwins Ltd.
- Leslie Montagu Thomas, MBE, TD, MP, Member of Parliament for Canterbury since 1953. For political and public services.
- Rear Admiral George Pirie Thomson, CB, CBE, Royal Navy (Retired). For services as Secretary, Services, Press and Broadcasting Committee.
- Reginald Everard Lindsay Wellington, CBE, Director of Sound Broadcasting, British Broadcasting Corporation.
- Richard van der Riet Woolley, OBE, Astronomer Royal.

State of Victoria

- Charles Holly McKay, CBE, President of the Branch in the State of Victoria of the Returned Sailors', Soldiers' and Airmen's Imperial League of Australia.

State of Queensland

- George Edward Green, Company Director, of Brisbane, State of Queensland. For charitable and philanthropic services.

State of South Australia

- James Robert Holden, Resident Director of General Motors–Holden's Proprietary Limited in the State of South Australia.

Southern Rhodesia

- Cyril James Hatty, formerly Minister of Mines and Industrial Development, and African Education.

Nyasaland

- Edgar Ignatius Godfrey Unsworth, CMG, QC, Chief Justice, Nyasaland.

Overseas Territories

- Harry Durham Butterfield, CBE, JP. For public services in Bermuda.
- Wilfrid Bowen Havelock, Minister for Agriculture and Animal Husbandry, Kenya.
- Cyril George Xavier Henriques, Chief Justice, Windward and Leeward Islands.
- Joseph Alexander Luckhoo, Chief Justice, British Guiana.
- André Lawrence Nairac, CBE, QC, Minister of Industry, Commerce and External Communications, Mauritius.

=== Order of the Bath ===
==== Knight Grand Cross of the Order of the Bath (GCB) ====
Military Division

- General Sir Richard Wakefield Goodbody, KBE, CB, DSO, ADC (Gen.), (26967), Colonel Commandant, Royal Horse Artillery; Colonel Commandant, Royal Regiment of Artillery; Colonel Commandant, Honourable Artillery Company (Territorial Army).
- Air Chief Marshal Sir Edmund Hudleston, KCB, CBE, ADC, Royal Air Force.

Civil Division

- Sir Laurence Norman Helsby, KBE, CB, Joint Permanent Secretary to HM Treasury and head of the Home Civil Service. Until recently Permanent Secretary, Ministry of Labour.

==== Knight Commander of the Order of the Bath (KCB) ====
Military Division

Royal Navy

- Vice-Admiral Desmond Parry Dreyer, CB, CBE, DSC.
- Vice-Admiral Peter William Gretton, CB, DSO, OBE, DSC.

Army

- Major-General Richard Elton Goodwin, CB, CBE, DSO, (40616), late Infantry; Colonel, 1st East Anglian Regiment (Royal Norfolk and Suffolk).
- Lieutenant-General Harold Edwin Knott, CB, OBE, QHP, MD, (41299), late Royal Army Medical Corps.

Royal Air Force

- Acting Air Marshal Sidney Richard Carlyle Nelson, CB, OBE, QHP, MD.

Civil Division

- Thomas George Barnett Cocks, CB, OBE, Clerk of the House of Commons.
- Sir Keith Anderson Hope Murray, Chairman, University Grants Committee.

==== Companion of the Order of the Bath (CB) ====
Military Division

Royal Navy

- Rear-Admiral Isaac William Trant Beloe, DSC.
- Rear-Admiral John Fitzroy Duyland Bush, DSC.
- Rear-Admiral Bryan Cecil Durant, DSO, DSC.
- Rear-Admiral Raymond Shayle Hawkins.
- Rear-Admiral John Howson, DSC.
- Rear-Admiral The Right Honourable David William Maurice, Viscount Kelburn, DSC.
- Rear-Admiral Hugh Stirling Mackenzie, DSO, DSC.
- Rear-Admiral John Percival Scatchard, DSC.
- Surgeon Rear-Admiral Derek Duncombe Steele-Perkins, CVO, QHS, FRCS, FRACS.
- Rear-Admiral Sir John Scarlett Warren Walsham, Bt., OBE.

Army

- Major-General Theodore Henry Birkbeck, CBE, DSO, (44960), late Infantry.
- Brigadier Ereld Boteler Wingfield Cardiff, CBE, (39101), late Foot Guards.
- Major-General John Malcolm McNeill, CBE, (41179), late Royal Regiment of Artillery.
- Major-General Ambrose Neponucene Trelawney Meneces, CBE, DSO, QHP, MD, FRCP, (44406), late Royal Army Medical Corps.
- The Venerable Archdeacon Ivan Delacherois Neill, OBE, QHC, (89720), Chaplain-General to the Forces.
- Major-General Denis Arthur Kay Redman, OBE, (63651), Corps of Royal Electrical and Mechanical Engineers.
- Major-General Reginald Booth Stockdale, OBE, (52739), Corps of Royal Electrical and Mechanical Engineers.
- Major-General John William Channing Williams, DSO, OBE, (41246), late Infantry.

Royal Air Force

- Air Vice-Marshal John Worrall, DFC.
- Acting Air Vice-Marshal John Lindsay Barker, CBE, DFC.
- Air Commodore Benjamin Ball, CBE.
- Air Commodore Wilfred Carter, DFC.
- Air Commodore Hugh Patrick Connolly, DFC, AFC, AFM.
- Air Commodore Ian George Esplin, OBE, DFC.
- Air Commodore Lewis MacDonald Hodges, CBE, DSO, DFC.
- Air Commodore Richard Julian Paget Prichard, CBE, DFC, AFC.

Civil Division

- Colonel Sir Hugh John Francis Sibthorp Cholmeley, Bt., DSO, Chairman, Territorial and Auxiliary Forces Association for the County of Lincoln.
- Dennis Cliff Haselgrove, Under-Secretary, Ministry of Transport.
- Brigadier Kenneth Soar Holmes, CBE, Director of Postal Services, General Post Office.
- Alan Blyth Hume, Assistant Under-Secretary of State, Scottish Office.
- George Leitch, OBE, Assistant Under-Secretary of State, War Office.
- William Andrew Leitch, First Parliamentary Draftsman, Government of Northern Ireland.
- David Thomas Lewis, Government Chemist, Department of Scientific and Industrial Research.
- John Haydon McCarthy, Under-Secretary, Ministry of Pensions and National Insurance.
- Kenneth McGregor, CMG, Under-Secretary, Board of Trade.
- Norman Victor Meeres, Under-Secretary, Ministry of Aviation.
- Ian Montgomery, Under-Secretary, Ministry of Defence.
- Samuel Dixon Musson, MBE, Principal Assistant Solicitor, Ministry of Health.
- John Samuel Orme, OBE, Assistant Under-Secretary of State, Air Ministry.
- William Charles Tame, Under-Secretary, Ministry of Agriculture, Fisheries and Food.
- Harry Truman Veall, Controller of Death Duties, Board of Inland Revenue.
- Frederick Charles Wilkins, Director of Stores, Admiralty.

=== Order of Saint Michael and Saint George ===
==== Knight Grand Cross of the Order of St Michael and St George (GCMG) ====
- Sir William Allmond Codrington Goode, KCMG, Governor and Commander-in-Chief, North Borneo.
- Sir Frank Kenyon Roberts, KCMG, Her Majesty's Ambassador Extraordinary and Plenipotentiary (designate) in Bonn.

==== Knight Commander of the Order of St Michael and St George (KCMG) ====
- George Herbert Andrew, CB, Second Secretary, Board of Trade.
- Sir Charles Richard Morris, Chairman, Inter-University Council for Higher Education Overseas.
- Norman Edgar Costar, CMG, British Commissioner in Trinidad and Tobago.
- Paul Francis Grey, CMG, Her Majesty's Ambassador Extraordinary and Plenipotentiary in Berne.
- Herbert Stanley Marchant, CMG, OBE, Her Majesty's Ambassador Extraordinary and Plenipotentiary in Havana.
- Derek Martin Hurry Riches, CMG, Her Majesty's Ambassador Extraordinary and Plenipotentiary in Leopoldville.
- John Christopher Blake Richmond, CMG, Her Majesty's Ambassador Extraordinary and Plenipotentiary in Kuwait.

==== Companion of the Order of St Michael and St George (CMG) ====
- George Blaker Blaker, Under-Secretary, HM Treasury.
- Philip Chantler, Under-Secretary, Ministry of Power.
- Joseph Lewis Reading, Assistant Secretary, Board of Trade.
- Major General John Francis Dawes Steedman, CBE, MC, Director of Works, Commonwealth War Graves Commission.
- Andrew Greville Parry Way, Commander, Metropolitan Police, for services in Montreal.
- Claude Harry Fenner, MBE, Director of Police Affairs, Federation of Malaya.
- Alexander Galloway, MBE, MB, FRCS, lately Dean of the Faculty of Medicine, Makerere University College, Kampala, Uganda.
- George Peter Hampshire, an Assistant Undersecretary of State in the Commonwealth Relations Office.
- Bertram Speakman Hanson, DSO, OBE, ED, MB, BS, of Beaumont, State of South Australia. For services to radiotherapy.
- Edmund Angus Jones, Company Director, State of Victoria. For public services.
- James Cameron Slaughter, Town Clerk, City of Brisbane, State of Queensland.
- William Peter D'Andrade, Secretary to the Treasury, British Guiana.
- Geoffrey James Ellerton, MBE, Permanent Secretary, Ministry of Defence, Kenya.
- John Neville Glover, QC, Legal Adviser to the Western Pacific High Commission and Attorney-General to the British Solomon Islands Protectorate.
- Jack Rose, MBE, DFC, Administrator, Cayman Islands.
- John Kenneth Thompson, Assistant Secretary, Colonial Office, seconded to the Department of Technical Co-operation.
- Anthony Michael Francis Webb, QC, Minister for Legal Affairs and Attorney-General, Kenya.
- Frank Richard Wilson, OBE, Provincial High Commissioner, Kenya.
- Geoffrey George Arthur, Counsellor, Her Majesty's Embassy, Cairo.
- Vernon Thomas Bayley, OBE, Foreign Office.
- Patrick Loftus Bushe-Fox, Foreign Office.
- Francis George Kenna Gallagher, Foreign Office.
- Peter Telford Hayman, MBE, Director-General, British Information Services, New York.
- Geoffrey Holt Seymour Jackson, Her Majesty's Consul-General, Seattle.
- Charles Martin Le Quesne, Her Majesty's Ambassador Extraordinary and Plenipotentiary in Bamako.
- Horatio Keith Matthews, MBE, Counsellor, British Military Government, Berlin.
- Horace Phillips, Counsellor (Oriental), Her Majesty's Embassy, Tehran.
- Frederick Archibald Warner, Foreign Office.

Southern Rhodesia

- Walter Alexander, MD, Speaker of the Legislative Assembly.

Northern Rhodesia

- Albert William Gaminara, Administrative Secretary.

=== Royal Victorian Order ===
==== Knight Grand Cross of the Royal Victorian Order (GCVO) ====
- The Right Honourable John, Earl of Eldon, KCVO.
- Brigadier Sir Norman Wilmshurst Gwatkin, KCVO, DSO.

==== Commander of the Royal Victorian Order (CVO) ====
- Holroyd Ferris Chambers, MVO.
- Colonel John Sidney North Fitzgerald, MBE, MC.
- Oliver Nicholas Millar, MVO.
- Adrian Christopher Ian Samuel, CMG.
- Group Captain Thomas Neville Stack, AFC, Royal Air Force.

==== Member of the Royal Victorian Order (MVO) ====
At this time the two lowest classes of the Royal Victorian Order were "Member (fourth class)" and "Member (fifth class)", both with post-nominal letters MVO. "Member (fourth class)" was renamed "Lieutenant" (LVO) from the 1985 New Year Honours onwards.

Fourth Class

- Alison David, MBE.
- Gordon Robert Stanley Hawkins.
- Lieutenant-Colonel Harold Andrew Balvaird Lawson.
- Commander Peter Maslen, Royal Navy.
- Commander William Terrence McKee, Royal Navy.
- Rodney Fleetwood Tatchell.
- Charles George Robert Warner, MVO.
- Muriel Elsie Irene Waterman.
- Andrew Money Woodman.

Fifth Class

- John Albert Boulton.
- Flight Lieutenant Derek St. John Homer, Royal Air Force.
- Julia Esme Vaughan Hudson.
- Lieutenant-Commander Michael Anthony Jones, Royal Navy.
- Norma Crawford Telfer.
- Michael David Tims.
- Charles Edward West.

=== Order of the British Empire ===
==== Knight Grand Cross of the Order of the British Empire (GBE) ====
Military Division

- Admiral Sir Wilfrid John Wentworth Woods, KCB, DSO.
- Air Chief Marshal Sir Walter Merton, KCB, OBE, ADC, Royal Air Force.

Civil Division

- Sir Geoffrey Arnold Wallinger, KCMG, Her Majesty's Ambassador Extraordinary and Plenipotentiary in Rio de Janeiro.
- Sir Colville Montgomery Deverell, KCMG, CVO, OBE, lately Governor and Commander-in-Chief, Mauritius.

==== Dame Commander of the Order of the British Empire (DBE) ====
Military Division

- Brigadier Florence Barbara Cozens, RRC, QHNS, (206096), Queen Alexandra's Royal Army Nursing Corps.

Civil Division

- Margaret Joyce Bishop, CBE, Headmistress, Godolphin and Latymer School, Hammersmith.
- Elisabeth Joy, Lady Murdoch, CBE. For social welfare services, especially in connection with the erection of a new Children's Hospital in Melbourne, State of Victoria.

==== Knight Commander of the Order of the British Empire (KBE) ====
Military Division

- Vice-Admiral Norman Egbert Denning, CB, OBE.
- Vice-Admiral John Graham Hamilton, CB, CBE.
- Lieutenant-General Denis Stuart Scott O'Connor, CB, CBE, (38415), late Royal Regiment of Artillery.
- Acting Air Marshal Edouard Michael Fitzfrederick Grundy, CB, OBE, Royal Air Force.
- Air Vice-Marshal Colin Scragg, CB, CBE, AFC, Royal Air Force.

Civil Division

- Brigadier Edward Roy Caffyn, CB, CBE, TD, DL, Vice-chairman, Council of Territorial and Auxiliary Forces Associations.
- John Clarke George, CBE, MP, Member of Parliament for the Pollok Division of Glasgow since 1955. Parliamentary Secretary, Ministry of Power, 1959–1962. For political and public services.
- Henry Norman Brain, CMG, OBE, Her Majesty's Ambassador Extraordinary and Plenipotentiary in Montevideo.
- Richard Geoffrey Austin Meade, CMG, CVO, lately Her Majesty's Consul-General, Milan.
- Maurice Arnold Nathan, CBE, Lord Mayor of the City of Melbourne, State of Victoria, since August 1961.

==== Commander of the Order of the British Empire (CBE) ====
Military Division

Royal Navy

- Captain Edward Anthony Savile Bailey, MBE, DSC.
- Instructor Captain John Athol Burnett.
- Captain Eric Arthur Walter Gibbs, (Retired) (lately Commander of the Royal East African Navy).
- Commodore Raymond Hart, DSO, DSC.
- Captain Francis Armshaw Lowe, DSC.
- Captain William Ridley Morton Murdoch, DSC, VRD, Royal Naval Reserve.
- Colonel (Acting Brigadier) John Richards, OBE, Royal Marines.
- Captain Archibald John Ramsay White, DSC, ADC.

Army

- Brigadier John Donald Adams, OBE, (47502), late Royal Regiment of Artillery (now R.A.R.O).
- Brigadier (temporary) John Evelyn Anderson (67073), late Royal Corps of Signals.
- Brigadier Rodney Lyon Travers Burges, DSO, (62516), late Royal Regiment of Artillery.
- Brigadier Neville Henry Layard Chesshyre (44916), late Corps of Royal Engineers (now R.A.R.O).
- Brigadier Kenneth Francis Daniell, OBE, (47534), late Corps of Royal Engineers.
- Colonel (temporary) Francis Harry Frankcom, OBE, (68894)] Royal Army Educational Corps.
- Colonel Robert Denys Matthews, TD, (153256), Staff, Territorial Army.
- Colonel William Graham Stead Mills (69270), late The Parachute Regiment.
- Brigadier Edward Forrester Parker, OBE, (44150), late Corps of Royal Engineers (now R.A.R.O).
- Colonel Leslie Douglas Slater, MBE, (65442), Royal Army Pay Corps.
- Brigadier Denis Edward Osbert Thackwell (41206), late Corps of Royal Engineers.
- Brigadier John Edward Francis Willoughby, OBE, (58173), late Infantry Colonel, The Middlesex Regiment (Duke of Cambridge's Own).
- Brigadier Dimitry Dimitrievitch Zvegintzov, OBE, (55890), late Infantry.
- Brigadier (temporary) Charles Fred Osborn Breese (66138), late Infantry; Commander, British Joint Services Training Team, Ghana.

Royal Air Force

- Air Commodore Leonard Claude Dennis.
- Group Captain Charles Stephen Betts.
- Group Captain Harry Burton, DSO, MBE.
- Group Captain Nigel Martin Maynard, DFC, AFC, ADC.
- Group Captain Denis Crowley-Milling, DSO, DFC.
- The Right Reverend Monsignor John Joseph Roche.
- Group Captain Clive Stanley George Stanbury, DSO, DFC, AFC.
- Group Captain Charles Vivian Winn, DSO, OBE, DFC.
- Acting Group Captain Thomas Lloyd Davies, MBE.
- Acting Group Captain Paul Clifford Webb, DFC.

Civil Division

- Arthur Abel, lately County Treasurer, Durham County Council.
- Ivan George Aspinall, JP. For political services in Blackpool.
- Geraldine Maitland Aves, OBE, Chief Welfare Officer, Ministry of Health.
- David Smith Barbour, MRCVS, Deputy Chief Veterinary Officer, Ministry of Agriculture, Fisheries and Food.
- Hester Maud Vere Barrington, MBE. For political and public services in Wessex.
- William Beattie, Librarian, National Library of Scotland.
- Bernard Boxall, Chairman, Scottish Aviation Ltd.
- Frederick Mason Brewer, MBE, Chairman, Southern Region Advisory Council for Further Education.
- Colonel Maurice Beaver Buchanan, TD, DL. For political and public services in Ayr.
- Arthur Chadwick, Comptroller of Accounts, Ministry of Public Building and Works.
- Archibald Gordon Chalmers, JP, Chairman, Highland Agricultural Executive Committee.
- Ernest Entwisle Cheesman, Deputy Chief Scientific Officer, Agricultural Research Council.
- George William Cole, Assistant Secretary, National Assistance Board.
- John Clifford Colligan, OBE, Secretary-General, Royal National Institute for the Blind.
- Arthur Henry Cooper, Technical Director, EMI Electronics Ltd.
- William Dudley Cooper, Secretary and Deputy Receiver, Office of the Receiver for the Metropolitan Police District.
- Sidney Clifton Smith-Cox, TD, JP. For political and public services in Weston-super-Mare.
- Edward Daly, Convener, Lanark County Council.
- William Croft Dickinson, MC, Fraser Professor of Ancient (Scottish) History and Palaeography, University of Edinburgh.
- Alderman William George Ernest Dyer. For political and public services in Nottingham.
- Guy Eden, Parliamentary Journalist.
- Robert Septimus Friar Edwards, General Manager, London Airports, Ministry of Aviation.
- Maurice Gordon Farquharson, OBE, MC, Secretary, British Broadcasting Corporation
- Professor Wilhelm Siegmund Feldberg, MD, Head of Division of Physiology and Pharmacology, National Institute for Medical Research.
- Alwyn Gwilym Sheppard Fidler, City Architect of Birmingham.
- Muriel Rose Forbes, JP, Alderman, Middlesex County Council.
- Russell John Forbes Regional Controller, North Western Region, Board of Trade.
- Raymond Eustace Ford, MD, MRCP, Senior Principal Medical Officer, Ministry of Health.
- Robert Foster, OBE, Actuary and General Manager, London Trustee Savings Bank.
- Albert James Galpin, MVO, OBE, Secretary, Lord Chamberlain's Office.
- Maurice Bertram Gates, MBE, Head of the Treaty and Nationality Department, Foreign Office.
- James Gibson. Assistant Secretary, HM Treasury.
- Reginald Charles Giggins, Director (Manager, Government Department), General Electric Co. Ltd.
- Charles Douglas Gill. For political and public services in Wakefield.
- Maurice Robert Haddock, OBE, ERD, General Manager and Secretary, National Dock Labour Board.
- Charles Edgar Mathewes Hardie, OBE, Deputy Chairman, Board of Management, Navy, Army and Air Force Institutes.
- Captain Kenneth Lanyon Harkness, DSC, Royal Navy (Retired), Regional Director of Civil Defence, London.
- William Rundle Hecker, Headmaster, St. Dunstan's College, Catford.
- Francis George Hole, Chairman, Board of Management, and General Manager, British Transport Hotels and Catering Services.
- Colonel George Trevor Kelway, TD, JP, DL. For political and public services in Pembrokeshire.
- Donald Mayer King, Chairman and Managing Director, George W. King Ltd., Manufacturers of crane hoists.
- Wilfred Thomas Cousins King. Editor, The Banker.
- Sydney James Kneale, OBE, First Deemster and Clerk of the Rolls, Isle of Man.
- William Ernest Clement Lampert, Deputy Director of Electrical Engineering, Admiralty.
- John Russell Lang Chairman, G. & J. Weir Ltd., Glasgow.
- Charles Harold Leach Chairman, West Midlands Gas Board.
- Cyril Frederick Lewis. Chief Commoner, City of London.
- Harry Lewis, JP. Chairman, Radnorshire Agricultural Executive Committee.
- Richard Lewis. Concert and Opera Singer.
- George Henry Lowthian, MBE, General Secretary, Amalgamated Union of Building Trade Workers.
- William James Millar Mackenzie, Professor of Government, Victoria University of Manchester.
- Robert McWhirter, FRCS(Ed.), FFR, Professor of Medical Radiology, University of Edinburgh.
- William Davis Munrow, Deputy Chief Inspector of Audit, Ministry of Housing and Local Government.
- Colonel William Nash, MBE, TD. For political and public services in Kent.
- Frederic Thomas Nicholson, JP. For political and public services in Norfolk.
- Hugh Bryan Nisbet, Principal, Heriot-Watt College, Edinburgh.
- Sidney Robert Nolan, Painter.
- Leslie George Norman, MD, FRCP, Chief Medical Officer, London Transport Executive.
- William David Opher, Chairman and Managing Director, Vickers-Armstrongs (Engineers) Ltd.
- Aylmer John Noel Paterson, Registrar, Judicial Committee, Privy Council Office.
- James Patton, OBE, Consultant, Smiths Dock Company. Ltd., North Shields.
- William Ewart Pitts, Chief Constable, Derbyshire Constabulary.
- Mary Rose Power, HM Inspector of Schools (Divisional Inspector), Ministry of Education.
- Thomas Vivian Prosser, Managing Director, William Thornton & Sons Ltd., Building and Civil Engineering Contractors, Liverpool.
- Professor Leslie Norman Pyrah, MCh, FRCS, Senior Surgeon, Urological Department, Leeds General Infirmary.
- John William Randall, Chairman, John Dickinson & Co. Ltd., Paper Converters and Stationery Manufacturers.
- Arthur Hilton Ridley. For political and public services in Northumberland.
- Arthur Howard Roberts. Lately Senior Representative, United Kingdom Royal Ordnance Factory Mission to Pakistan.
- Sidney Roberts, Managing Director, Hoover Ltd., Perivale, Middlesex.
- Alfred Talbot Rogers, MB, BS. For services to the National Health Service in the South Eastern Counties.
- Colonel Nigel Victor Stopford Sackville, OBE, TD, JP, Liaison Officer to the Minister of Agriculture, Fisheries and Food.
- William McCormick Sharpe, DSO, Registrar, Supreme Court of Judicature in Northern Ireland.
- Alfred Harold Sheffield, Assistant Secretary, Department of Technical Co-operation.
- William Vincent Sheppard, Director-General of Production, National Coal Board.
- Leonard Highton Short, MC, Director of Overseas Operations, English Electric Co. Ltd.
- Frank Charles Skinner, MM, Clerk to Special Commissioners and Inspector of Foreign Dividends, Board of Inland Revenue.
- Percival John Smith, MBE, JP, DL, Alderman, Glamorgan County Council.
- John Bamber Speakman, Professor of Textile Industries, University of Leeds.
- Dorothy Theresa, Lady Spens. For social services in Cambridgeshire, including services to the British Red Cross Society.
- Russell Parnham Spink, Chairman, Council of the Institute of Certificated Grocers.
- John Henry Trower, OBE, Chairman, Newcastle upon Tyne Savings Committee.
- Alfred Rene John Paul Ubbelohde, Professor of Thermodynamics, Imperial College of Science and Technology, University of London.
- John Walker, Keeper of Coins and Medals, British Museum.
- Susan Armour Walker. For political services.
- Lawrence Farbon Wass, JP. For political and public services in Enfield.
- Andrew Watt, Director of Forestry for Scotland.
- Captain Geoffrey Alan Wild, lately Commodore Master, SS Canberra, Peninsular & Oriental Steam Navigation Company.
- Margaret Ann Willis. For political services in Stratford-on-Avon.
- Gordon Chamberlain Wilson, Assistant Secretary (Regional Controller, North Western Region), Ministry of Labour.
- Colonel Henry James Wilson, OBE, TD, Deputy President, National Farmers' Union of England and Wales.
- Hubert Martin Wilson, Secretary for Education, Shropshire County Council.
- Frank Yates, Head of Statistics Department, Rothamsted Experimental Station, Harpenden, Hertfordshire.
- Francis Dyson Yeatman, Clerk of Assize, Western Circuit, Supreme Court of Judicature.
- Alexander Hanson Ballantyne, CVO, Counsellor (Commercial), Her Majesty's Embassy, Ankara.
- John Still Bennett, CVO, OBE, Counsellor (Regional Information Officer), Her Majesty's Embassy, Bangkok.
- Dunstan Michael Carr Curtis, lately Deputy Secretary-General, Council of Europe.
- Lyndsay Menzies Hopkins, OBE, British Consul, New York.
- Ronald Cooper Keymer, OBE, British subject resident in Khartoum.
- Eric Parry, OBE, FRCS(Ed.), lately Chief Medical Officer, Kuwait Government Service.
- Michael Friend Serpell, lately Counsellor, Office of the United Kingdom Commissioner-General for South-East Asia, Singapore.
- Clifford Bertram Bruce Heathcote-Smith, Counsellor (Commercial) and Consul-General, Her Majesty's Embassy, Copenhagen.
- George Malcolm Wilson, OBE, General Manager in Bolivia of the Antofagasta-Bolivia Railway.
- William Bryden, Director of the Tasmanian Museum and Art Gallery, Hobart, State of Tasmania.
- William Joseph Campbell, Auditor-General, State of New South Wales.
- Joseph Arthur Ellis, a civil engineer, State of Western Australia. For public services.
- John Callachor Fletcher, President of the Rural Bank, State of New South Wales.
- Richard Michael Laurie Lemon, Chief Operating Superintendent, East African Railways and Harbours.
- The Reverend William Frederick Mackenzie, MBE, Aurukun Presbyterian Mission, Gulf of Carpentaria, State of Queensland.
- Stanley Felipe Owen, Acting Director of Public Works, Federation of Malaya.
- Ivan Lloyd Phillips, OBE, formerly officiating as Secretary, Ministry of Interior, Federation of Malaya.
- Percival Lincoln Puckridge, Mayor of Port Lincoln, State of South Australia.
- Sim Rubensohn, Company Director of Sydney, State of New South Wales. For charitable and other community services.
- Hugh Leslie Simpson, Chairman, Rural Finance and Settlement Commission, State of Victoria.
- Arthur Rawdon Spinney, OBE, Chairman of the British Residents' Association in Cyprus.
- Ernest Henry Lee-Steere, President of the Pastoralists and Graziers Association, State of Western Australia.
- Geoffrey Noel Noel-Tod, OBE, President of the United Kingdom Citizens' Association in India.
- Edward Joseph Hartley Berwick, Director of Agriculture, North Borneo.
- Geoffrey Allardyce Bethell. For public services in the Bahamas.
- Norman Keith Cameron, OBE. For public services in the Falkland Islands.
- Angus Alexander Lawrie. For public services in Kenya.
- Aubrey Gordon Leacock, FRCS, LRCP, Surgeon Specialist, Barbados General Hospital.
- William Hog McNeill. For public services in Singapore.
- The Most Reverend Emmanuel Mabathoana, Archbishop of Maseru, Basutoland.
- P. H. Meadows, MC, lately Deputy Permanent Secretary, Prime Minister's Office, Singapore.
- Cuthbert James Norman, Commissioner of Prisons, Hong Kong.
- Abdool Raman Mahomed Osman. For public services in Mauritius.
- Murugasu Sockalingam, OBE. For public services in Sarawak.
- John Gordon Thomson. For public services in Aden.

Southern Rhodesia

- Jack William Pithey, Secretary for Justice and Internal Affairs.

Nyasaland

- Henry John Hawkins Borley, Director of Game, Fish and Tsetse Control Department, Nyasaland.

==== Officer of the Order of the British Empire (OBE) ====
Military Division

Royal Navy

- Commander Arthur Joseph George Bailey, (Retired).
- Commander Alan Duncan Baird.
- Surgeon Commander William Andrew Burnett, MRCS, LRCP.
- Lieutenant-Commander Arthur Richard Cole.
- The Reverend Hugh Selwyn Fry, Chaplain.
- Shipwright Commander Kenneth Albert James Goddard.
- Lieutenant-Commander Laurence Douglas Hamlyn.
- Commander James Edward Campbell Kennon.
- Senior Chief Engineer George James Mathews, Royal Fleet Auxiliary Service.
- Major John Ivor Headon Owen, Royal Marines.
- Commander Philip Edward Travis, (Retired).

Army

- Lieutenant-Colonel Dennis Ewing Ballantine, MBE, MC, (85673), The Duke of Edinburgh's Royal Regiment (Berkshire and Wiltshire).
- Lieutenant-Colonel James Arthur Blount, TD, (288107), Royal Army Service Corps, Territorial Army.
- Lieutenant-Colonel Albert John Brewster, TD, (409178), Royal Regiment of Artillery, Territorial Army.
- Lieutenant-Colonel Douglas Haig Earl Coker (193505), 13th/18th Royal Hussars (Queen Mary's Own), Royal Armoured Corps.
- Lieutenant-Colonel (acting) Thomas Alexander Hamilton Coltman (35011), Army Cadet Force (now retired).
- Lieutenant-Colonel Reginald Davenport (174956), Corps of Royal Military Police.
- The Reverend Robert Alexander Harpur, Chaplain to the Forces, 2nd Class (291624), Royal Army Chaplains' Department.
- Lieutenant-Colonel (temporary) Ruby Hill, MBE, (297978), Women's Royal Army Corps.
- Lieutenant-Colonel (acting) Henry James Johnson, TD, (300853), Special Air Service Regiment, Territorial Army.
- Lieutenant-Colonel Edmond Robert Jolley, MBE, (363758), 13th/18th Royal Hussars (Queen Mary's Own) Royal Armoured Corps (Employed List 1).
- Lieutenant-Colonel William Ernest Bruce-Jones, MBE, TD, (74179), The Staffordshire Regiment (The Prince of Wales's) (Employed List 1).
- Lieutenant-Colonel Alistair James Strang Martin, MBE, (74694), Queen's Own Highlanders (Seaforth and Camerons).
- Lieutenant-Colonel George McMurtrie (348418), The Royal Highland Fusiliers (Princess Margaret's Own Glasgow and Ayrshire Regiment) (Employed List 1).
- Major John Alec Newbery, MBE, ERD, (52746), Royal Regiment of Artillery (now retired).
- Lieutenant-Colonel Agnes Hume Nichol (206354), Queen Alexandra's Royal Army Nursing Corps.
- Lieutenant-Colonel William Henry Pearman (161680), Army Catering Corps.
- Lieutenant-Colonel (temporary) (local Colonel) Alistair Ian Greville Ramsay (69132), The Royal Highland Fusiliers (Princess Margaret's Own Glasgow and Ayrshire Regiment) (now R.A.R.O.).
- Lieutenant-Colonel Leslie Frederick Richards, MBE, (380592), Corps of Royal Military Police.
- Lieutenant-Colonel (temporary) William Edward Robinson (158239), Royal Tank Regiment, Royal Armoured Corps.
- Lieutenant-Colonel (Chief Recruiting Officer) Brian Wellesley Roe, DSO, (413776), Indian Army (Retired).
- Lieutenant-Colonel (now Colonel (temporary)) Alan Simmons, MBE, (103823), Corps of Royal Electrical and Mechanical Engineers.
- Brevet and Temporary Lieutenant-Colonel Ronald Macaulay Somerville, MBE, (126254), Royal Regiment of Artillery.
- Lieutenant-Colonel John Douglas Beauchamp Thornton, MBE, (268261), Royal Corps of Signals.
- Brevet and Temporary Lieutenant-Colonel David Arthur Hodges Toler, MC, (165027), Coldstream Guards.
- Lieutenant-Colonel (temporary) Michael Robin Rogers Turner, MBE, (74623), The Prince of Wales's Own Regiment of Yorkshire (now R.A.R.O).
- Lieutenant-Colonel John Llewellyn Waddy (95593), The Parachute Regiment.
- Lieutenant-Colonel (now Colonel) the Honourable John Robert Warrender, MC, (118568), The North Somerset Yeomanry/44th Royal Tank Regiment, Royal Armoured Corps, Territorial Army.
- Lieutenant-Colonel Evelyn Roy Farnell-Watson, MC, (66635), Royal Tank Regiment, Royal Armoured Corps.
- Lieutenant-Colonel Thomas Reginald Reece Weston, TD, (165514), Royal Regiment of Artillery, Territorial Army (now T.A.R.O).
- Lieutenant-Colonel Peter Conrad White (63840), The Cheshire Regiment.
- Lieutenant-Colonel (acting) John Bernard Williams, TD, (79756), Combined Cadet Force.
- Lieutenant-Colonel Richard Frederick Noble Anderson, MC, (95071), Corps of Royal Engineers; on loan to the Government of the Federation of Malaya.
- Lieutenant-Colonel Brian Devlin, MBE, MB, ChB, (252477), Royal Army Medical Corps; on loan to the Government of the Federation of Malaya.
- Lieutenant-Colonel John Evelyn Gabain, MBE, RD, lately Assistant Commandant (Volunteers), Singapore.

Royal Air Force

- Wing Commander Ben Brown (46691), (Retired).
- Wing Commander Eric Burchmore, MBE, (49361).
- Wing Commander Graeme Keith Bushell (55050).
- Wing Commander Norman John Cape (54851).
- Wing Commander Maurice Ernest Claxton, (88130).
- Wing Commander James Grant Duncan, MBE, (136517).
- Wing Commander Ronald Alfred George Ellen, MBE, (39973), (Retired).
- Wing Commander Alan Edgar Foster (51448).
- Wing Commander Derek Jack Furner, DFC, AFC, (127259).
- Wing Commander Reginald Irvan Gray (45910).
- Wing Commander Leonard George Hopkinson, MBE, (49141).
- Wing Commander Eric Edward Wynn Lloyd-Jones (500057).
- Wing Commander Harry Clark McFarlane (55549).
- Wing Commander Gordon Packe (37070).
- Wing Commander Cyril Charles Povey, DFC, (173433).
- Acting Wing Commander Edwin John Bush (65078), Royal Air Force Volunteer Reserve (Training Branch).
- Squadron Leader Joseph Lionel Farr (154733).
- Squadron Leader Geofrey Roy Piper (151209)) Royal Air Force.
- Squadron Leader (now Group Captain) the Honourable Peter Beckford Rutgers Vanneck, AFC, (205378), Royal Auxiliary Air Force.

Civil Division

- Colonel Fred Leslie Abel, TD, DL, Member, Territorial and Auxiliary Forces Association for the County of Cheshire.
- Ashley George Abraham, MB, ChB, General Practitioner, Cumberland.
- Ernst Heinrich Leonhard Albert, Principal, Foreign Office.
- John Frederick Alcock, Chairman and Managing Director, Hunslet (Holdings) Ltd.
- William Henry Alderman, Assistant Director of Ordnance Factories, War Office.
- Robert Arkley Anderson, Member, Newcastle Regional Hospital Board.
- Alfred Leonard Armstrong, Chief Executive Officer, Ministry of Aviation.
- Bernard Astley Astley, Principal, Department of Technical Co-operation.
- Henry James Atkins, Chairman, National Council of Wholesale Egg Districtors.
- Margaret Ball, Chairman, Devon Advisory Committee, National Assistance Board.
- Christian Barman. For services as Executive Member, Design Panel, British Transport Commission.
- William John Lucas Bennett. Lately Principal Clerk to the Corporation of Lloyd's.
- Margaret Clara Bird, Principal Clerk, Board of Inland Revenue.
- Thomas Edmund Conrad Bond, Superintending Valuer, Board of Inland Revenue.
- Gertrude Lyford Boyd, MBE. For political and public services in Ayr.
- Thomas Wilson Boyd, DSO. For services as President, Hull Fishing Vessel Owners' Association, Ltd.
- Lieutenant-Colonel Charles Leofric Boyle, Secretary, The Fauna Preservation Society.
- Ethel Maud Brace, Chairman, East Ham Savings Committee.
- Laurence Brander. Lately Director, Publications Department, British Council.
- Clement Sidney Charles Bridge, MBE, Senior Chief Executive Officer, Ministry of Transport.
- Sibyl Clement Brown, Inspector, Grade I, Children's Department, Home Office.
- John Brownlee, Secretary and Treasurer, Board of Management for Dumfries and Galloway Hospitals.
- John William Bruford, MRCVS, Veterinary Surgeon, Sevenoaks.
- Willis Butters, JP, Member, Joint Central Committee and a Vice-President, St. Andrew's Ambulance Association.
- John Russell Campbell, Chairman, Reading and Slough District Advisory Committee, Southern Regional Board for Industry.
- Alderman Samuel Gowrie Dalrymple Campbell, BEM, JP, Chairman, Oswestry Disablement Advisory Committee.
- Harold George Campey, Head of Publicity, British Broadcasting Corporation.
- Albert John Chislett, Clerk to the Croydon Borough Justices.
- John William Arthur Chorley, Assistant Commissioner, Civil Service Commission.
- Harold John Clark, MBE, Assistant Controller of Supplies, Ministry of Public Building and Works.
- William Frank Catterall Clark, Directing Accountant, Ministry of Agriculture, Fisheries and Food.
- David Edwin Coffer, General Secretary, British Legion.
- The Honourable Elsa Joan Collingwood, JP. For political services in Newton.
- Demetrius Coming, Chairman and Managing Director, Dexion Ltd.
- Margaret Morrison Copland, JP, Headmistress, Grove Park Grammar School for Girls, Wrexham.
- Leonard James Corbett, lately General Manager, Industrial Estates Management Corporation for Wales.
- The Honourable Fiennes Neil Wykeham Cornwallis, Chairman, County Quality Bacon Federation.
- Leonard Richard Creasy, Chief Structural Engineer, Ministry of Public Building and Works.
- Oswald James Crompton, Director and General Manager, British Insulated Calender's Construction Co. Ltd.
- Alfred Norman Croxford, Chief Executive Officer, Ministry of Agriculture, Fisheries and Food.
- Lieutenant-Colonel Charles Walter Dann, MC, ED, lately Director, Herefordshire Community Council.
- Suhar David, General Sales Director, Gestetner Ltd.
- Harold Eynon Davies, Chairman, Cardiff Schools Savings Sub-Committee.
- Samuel Davies, JP, Vice-chairman, Royal College of Advanced Technology, Salford, Lancashire.
- Joseph Davis. For services to Billiards and Snooker.
- William Arthur Dearman, Chief Executive Officer, Ministry of Pensions and National Insurance.
- Major Albert Edward Denman, MBE, Principal, General Post Office.
- Norman Enoch Dixon, Chairman, Auto-Cycle Union.
- James Alexandra Thomas Douglas. For political services.
- Henry James Corley Dryden, MBE, Grade A.III Officer, Government Communications Headquarters.
- John Webster Dudderidge. For services to Canoeing.
- Fred Duke, JP, Alderman, Rotherham County Borough, West Riding of Yorkshire.
- Frank John Eager, Principal, Ministry of Pensions and National Insurance.
- Patrick Noel Greer Edge, DSC, Member, National Advisory Council on the Employment of the Disabled.
- Ernest Edwards, Senior Chief Executive Officer, Export Credits Guarantee Department.
- Lieutenant-Colonel Martyn Ivor Williams-Ellis, JP, DL, Chairman, Merioneth Local Employment Committee.
- Frederick John Evans, Regional Planning Officer, Scottish Development Department.
- Alderman Harold Fairbotham, Chairman, Kingston upon Hull Watch and Licensing Committee.
- Thomas Charles Foley, Secretary, Pedestrians' Association for Road Safety.
- Euphemia Beith Forrest, MBE, Chairman, Streets and Social Organisations Advisory Committee of the Scottish Savings Committee.
- Jean Richmond Forrest, Senior Dental Officer, Ministry of Health.
- Lieutenant-Colonel Richard Francis Foster, TD, DL, Alderman, Haverfordwest Borough Council.
- Edwin Worton Fowler, JP, Chairman of No.'s 1367, 2216, 2217, 2308 Squadrons, Combined Committee, Air Training Corps.
- John William Georgeson, Chief Constable, Caithness Constabulary.
- Frederick William Goodchild, Regional Controller, London North Region, National Assistance Board.
- Gontran Iceton Goulden, TD, Director, The Building Centre.
- William Kenneth Grimley, Senior Principal Scientific Officer, Admiralty Underwater Weapons Establishment, Portland, Dorset.
- George Hamilton, Senior Legal Assistant, Ministry of Health and Local Government, Northern Ireland.
- Albert Harding, Principal Inspector, Board of Customs and Excise.
- Jack Kempson Harlow, Managing Director, Mid-Tyne Group Training Council, Ltd.
- John Dudley Harmer, JP. For political and public services in Kent.
- Robert Henry Travell Harper, Chief Structural Engineer, The de Havilland Aircraft Co. Ltd.
- Alfred Lester Harris, Principal Examiner, Board of Trade.
- Alderman Arnold William Harrison, Deputy Chairman, Sheffield Regional Hospital Board.
- Clarita Elizabeth Hartley, Training Adviser, Commonwealth Headquarters, Girl Guides Association.
- Lionel Harvey, MBE, Central Services Planning Officer, British Broadcasting Corporation.
- Alexander Hay, General Secretary, Association of Agriculture.
- Harry Hobson, Principal in the firm of Harry Hobson & Co. London, Pedigree Livestock Auctioneers and Exporters.
- Lieutenant-Colonel Henry Atkinson Holme, JP, DL, Chairman, Ayrshire War Pensions Committee.
- Hubert George Hopkins, Senior Principal Scientific Officer, Radio Research Station, Department of Scientific and Industrial Research.
- Charles Reginald Hoskyn, AM, MD, lately General Practitioner, Rugby.
- Edgar George Leonard Howitt, MBE, Traffic Manager, Cable & Wireless Ltd.
- Alderman Harold William Hughes. For political and public services in Liverpool.
- Barnet Harris Hurwitz, JP. For services to the Jewish community in Belfast.
- Edward Moss Hutchinson, Secretary, National Institute of Adult Education.
- William Spencer Johnson. For political and public services in Buckinghamshire.
- Charles Robert Jones, Assistant Director, Research Association of British Flour Millers.
- Emyr Evans-Jones. Lately Manager, Operations Department, Esso Petroleum Co. Ltd.
- Gwilym Brynmor Jones, JP. For Magisterial Services in Glamorgan.
- Henry Francis Jones, MC. Lately Manager, Marine Bunker Fuel, British Mexican Petroleum Company.
- Trevor Wilson Jones. Formerly Senior Chief Executive Officer, now Principal Executive Officer, Air Ministry.
- Diana Jordan, Warden, Woolley Hall, West Riding, College for in-service teacher training.
- Lieutenant-Commander Peter Kemp Kemp, Royal Navy (Retired), Head of Historical Section and Librarian, Admiralty.
- Alderman Henry Lock Kendell, Chairman, Civil Defence Committee, Croydon.
- Captain Frederick Walter Kent, Master, SS Hardwicke Grange, Houlder Brothers & Co. Ltd., London.
- Stanley Kinder, Managing Director, Yorkshire Division, Lancashire and Yorkshire Tulketh Group Ltd.
- Robert Harold Kneen, Principal Inspector of Taxes, Board of Inland Revenue.
- Herbert Edwin Knott, Chief Executive Officer, Ministry of Pensions and National Insurance.
- John Leslie Templeton Knox, MB, BCh, General Practitioner, Nottingham.
- Frank Couch Lander, lately President of the Colonial Civil Servants Association.
- Nathaniel Montague Lane, MC, lately Surveyor of the Diocese of Southwell, Nottinghamshire.
- Donald Andrew Lang, Chief Experimental Officer, Ministry of Aviation.
- Dennis George Charles Lawrence, Assistant Secretary, General Post Office.
- John Alan Hewson Lees, Naval Architect, The British & Commonwealth Shipping Co. Ltd.
- David Hazlett Logan, Director and General Manager, Larne Harbour, Ltd.
- John Robertson Low, Headmaster, Hawick High School, Roxburghshire.
- Dorothy Sarah Lyndsay, MBE, Chairman, Streets Savings Committee, Londonderry.
- David McClelland, Principal, Ballymena Technical College, County Antrim.
- George MacDonald, Principal Clerk of Session, Court of Session, Edinburgh.
- George Adams McIlrath. For political and public services in County Londonderry.
- James Sargent Porteous MacKenzie, Grade 2 Officer, Ministry of Labour.
- Mary Ann Mackie, MBE, Deputy Controller, Yorkshire and Lincolnshire Region, Ministry of Labour.
- Hugh Ferns McLeod. For services to Rugby Union Football in Scotland.
- Standish Masterman, Senior Principal Scientific Officer, Ministry of Power.
- Eric Maxwell. Lately Chief Financial Officer, South of Scotland Electricity Board.
- John Owen Mayer, Engineer I, Ministry of Aviation.
- William Simm Melville, Manager, Military Radar Engineering Department, Associated Electrical Industries Ltd., Leicester.
- Herbert Siegfried Frederick Menges, Musical Director and Conductor, Brighton Philharmonic Society.
- Roland Arthur Mickelwright, Principal, Hospital Administrative Staff College.
- John George Milton, Director and Chief Engineer, Permutit Co. Ltd., Chiswick.
- Arthur Robert Mitchell, MBE, MC, JP, lately Director and Naval Architect, Yarrow & Co. Ltd., Glasgow.
- Edgar Frank Mitchell, Director, F. W. Mitchell Ltd., Bakers and Confectioners, Worthing.
- David Yorwerth Morgan, MBE, Education Officer, Pakistan, British Council.
- Professor James Morrison, Senior Principal Scientific Officer, Ministry of Agriculture, Northern Ireland.
- William James Moyce, Senior Superintendent, Explosives Division Weapons Group, Aldermaston, United Kingdom Atomic Energy Authority.
- Percy Nickson, Chairman, High Wycombe National Insurance Local Tribunal.
- Percy Charles Reames Noble, Senior Legal Assistant, Board of Customs and Excise.
- Violet Alys Norton, Director, Denbighshire Branch, British Red Cross Society.
- Gwyn Elvire Owen, MBE, Administrator, County of London, Women's Voluntary Service.
- Evan Darrell Parkhouse, Secretary, Rural Industries Bureau.
- Henry Glynne Parry, Chairman, Wigan Savings Committee.
- Gerald Frederick Payne, BEM, Commander, Metropolitan Police.
- Arnold Elliot Pearce. For services in the improvement of working conditions in the iron founding industry.
- David Frederick Bayly Pike, Senior Principal Scientific Officer, Army Operational Research Establishment, War Office.
- David Thomas Jack Prentice. For political services in Leicester.
- Lewis Thomas Prothero, Superintending Civil Engineer, Headquarters, No. 7 Works Area, Royal Air Force, Newmarket.
- Francis Anthony Quinn, Senior Chief Executive Officer, Foreign Office.
- Arthur Morgan Rees, Chief Constable, Denbighshire Constabulary.
- William Reid, JP. For political services in County Antrim.
- John Riddell, MD, Medical Officer of Health for the Counties of Midlothian and Peebles.
- Stuart Millward Rix, Deputy Chairman, Southern Electricity Board.
- Captain John Percy Ruddock, Commander, HM Telegraph Ship Alert.
- Louis Joseph Rydill, Chief Constructor, Ship Department, Admiralty.
- Kenneth Saddington, Head of Laboratories, Windscale Works, United Kingdom Atomic Energy Authority.
- Edward Thomas Salter, Principal Architect, Ministry of Housing and Local Government.
- Reginald McCartney Samples, DSO, Director, British Information Services in Canada (Chief Information Officer (B)), Commonwealth Relations Office.
- Captain Owen Harris Shepheard, Master, Esso Austria, Esso Petroleum Co. Ltd., London.
- William Kennedy Shepherd, Estates and Development Valuer, Plymouth City Council.
- William Reginald Shepherd, Principal Inspector of Taxes, Board of Inland Revenue.
- Arthur Sherrard, Chief Executive Officer, Board of Trade.
- Robert James Pomeroy Simonds, General Manager and Secretary, Land Settlement Association Ltd.
- Robert Edgar Hope-Simpson, MRCS, LRCP, General Practitioner, Cirencester.
- Marjorie Sinclair. For political and public services in Belfast.
- Olive Sinclair. For political services in Northumberland and Durham.
- Arthur Edward Smith. For services in the establishment of Nature Reserves in Lincolnshire and elsewhere.
- Alderman Elizabeth Ellen Smith, JP. For political and public services in the West Riding of Yorkshire.
- Harry Smith, Headmaster, Stanton Hill County Secondary Modern School, Mansfield.
- The Reverend Canon Hugh Thomas Smith, lately Chaplain General of Prisons, Prison Commission.
- Lieutenant-Colonel Samuel Sidney Smith, DL, Member, Territorial and Auxiliary Forces Association for the County of Bedford.
- Trevor Grafton Smith, Special correspondent of the Melbourne Herald Cable Service in London.
- William Smith, JP, Managing Director, Moray Firth Fish-selling Company.
- Henry Stanbridge Egerton Snelson, Chief Rural Officer, National Council of Social Service.
- Frederick Cory Spear, Alderman, Taunton Borough Council.
- Thomas Spence, DSC, lately Building Superintendent, New Zealand Shipping Co. Ltd., London.
- John Carter Malone Sutcliffe, Principal Officer, Northern Ireland District, Ministry of Transport.
- Charles John Swanson, MB, ChB, Chairman of the General Council (Scotland), British Medical Association.
- Edward Thorn Sykes, Director, Boxworth Experimental Husbandry Farm.
- William Isaac Taylor, Chairman, Long Eaton and District Local Employment Committee, Derbyshire.
- Alderman Cyril Thackray. For political and public services in the West Riding of Yorkshire.
- George Frederick James Thomas, MRCS, LRCP, Medical Superintendent, St. David's Hospital, Cardiff, lately Medical Officer in charge of Penrhys Smallpox Hospital.
- John Benjamin Thomas, JP. For political and public services in South Wales.
- Adam Bruce Thomson, President, Royal Scottish Society of Painters in Water Colours.
- Edmund Boyd Thomson, Controller, Statistical Office, Board of Customs and Excise.
- William Thomson, Head of Duthie Experimental Farm, Rowett Research Institute, Scotland.
- Richard Francis Thurman. For services to the Boy Scouts Association.
- Bertram Percival Treagus, Chief Clerk, Taxing Office, Supreme Court of Judicature.
- Mary Katharine, Lady Trevelyan. For services to the National Federation of Women's Institutes and the Council for the Preservation of Rural England.
- Angus Turnbull, MBE, Chairman, Sunderland Rural District Savings Committee.
- Jocelyn Brian Vickery, Chief Officer, Nottinghamshire Fire Brigade.
- Seymour Charles Vince, Chief Engineer, British Electric Traction Federation Ltd.
- Percival Dixon Ward, Deputy Director of Statistics, Ministry of Labour.
- John Edwin Thomas Welland, Secretary, London Motor Cab Proprietors' Association.
- James Peter Whittet, JP. For political and public services in Caithness and Sutherland.
- John Eric Whittome, Chairman, Federation of Agricultural Co-operatives in Great Britain and Ireland.
- Herbert William Whybrow. For political services in Colchester.
- Edward John Charles Williams, Principal Fire Service Officer, Air Ministry.
- Lieutenant-Colonel Gilbert Slater Willis, TD, JP, Chairman, Sheffield and District War Pensions Committee.
- William David Willison. For services to housing in Wandsworth.
- Marjorie Morison Wilson, MB, ChB, Medical Officer, Ministry of Education.
- Walter Winterbottom. For services as Manager of the English Association Football Team.
- Alfred Harold Wolseley, County Inspector, Royal Ulster Constabulary.
- Gordon Bigland Wood. For political services in Cambridgeshire.
- Stanley Albert Wood, Assistant Director, War Office.
- Arthur Bett, British subject resident in Colombia.
- Christopher Thomas Ewart Ewart-Biggs, Her Majesty's Consul, Algiers.
- Mervyn Brown, First Secretary and Consul, Her Majesty's Embassy, Vientiane.
- Robert Bruce, British Council Representative, Thailand.
- John Shearme Curtis, British subject resident in the Philippines.
- John Dennis Duncanson, First Secretary, British Advisory Mission to Vietnam.
- John James Stewart Perowne Francey, British subject resident in Panama.
- Ian Gordon Greenlees, Director, British Institute, Florence.
- Francis Charlton Hallawell, British subject resident in Brazil.
- Helen Mary Herrick, lately Lecturer, College of Education, Baghdad.
- Robert John Hilton, British Council Representative, Morocco.
- Donald Mackenzie, British subject resident in Mexico.
- John William Main, First Secretary, Her Majesty's Embassy, Djakarta.
- Arthur Richard Miles, Inspector-General, Public Safety Branch, British Military Government, Berlin.
- Frank Mitchell, Director, British Information Services, Washington.
- Stanley John Robins, Secretary-General, British Chamber of Commerce in Belgium.
- Michael Charlton Whittall, lately First Secretary, Her Majesty's Embassy, Amman.
- Keith McQuarrie Bennett, of Whyalla, State of South Australia. For public services.
- John Patrick Bray, RD. For services to the British community in Karachi, Pakistan.
- Robert Cameron. For public services in the State of New South Wales.
- Major Ralph Sievright Connor, Australian Military Forces (Retired List), Private Secretary to the Governor of the State of New South Wales.
- Norman George Ellingham, lately Controller of Postal Services, East African Posts and Telecommunications Administration.
- Ivan Ross Elliott. For services to the dairying industry in the State of South Australia.
- Fritz Homburg, of Tanunda, State of South Australia. For services to the community.
- Joseph Hugh Lewis-Hughes. For services to the Civil Defence Organisation, State of New South Wales.
- John Blackwood Islip, Secretary, Royal Victorian Institute of Architects, and Registrar, Architects Registration Board, State of Victoria.
- Robert Stanley Kenrick, State Engineer, Pahang, Federation of Malaya.
- John McCracken, General Manager, Indian Iron and Steelworks, Burnpur, India.
- Albert Frederick Mellanby, Master Mariner, Marine Superintendent (Lakes), East African Railways and Harbours.
- Arthur John Stanley Meyers, of Brisbane, State of Queensland. For services to Ambulance and First Aid Organisations.
- Percival James John Moodie, Alderman of the Bathurst City Council, State of New South Wales.
- Cedric Mapley Moore, JP, President of the Municipal Association, State of Tasmania.
- The Reverend Arthur Preston, of the West End Methodist Mission, Brisbane, State of Queensland.
- Sydney Parker Roach, in recognition of his service with the Royal Ordnance Factories Mission to Pakistan.
- Lindsay John Rose, Official Secretary to the Governor of the State of New South Wales.
- Brian Thomas Leonard Sanderson, Deputy General Manager, Malayan Railway.
- William Edgar Stannard, formerly Chairman of the Milk Board in the State of Western Australia.
- Alfred Strickland Thomas, MB, ChM, President, National Rose Society, State of Victoria.
- Guy Thomson, President, Greenbushes Shire Council, State of Western Australia.
- Mary Thomson, President, Creche and Kindergarten Association, State of Queensland.
- The Venerable Frederick William Tugwell, ED, Archdeacon Emeritus of Parramatta, State of New South Wales.
- William David Vaughan, JP, Councillor, Kew City Council, State of Victoria.
- Thomas Burrup Voice, Chief Police Officer, Johore, Federation of Malaya.
- Kenneth Martin Wilcox. For services to the British community in India.
- Ronald Aitken, Director of Prisons, British Guiana.
- Jairam Bisessar, MB, BCh. For public services in British Guiana.
- Ernest Berchmore Carter. For public services in Barbados.
- Cheng Kuok Mee, Education Officer, North Borneo.
- Cecil Gordon Cox, Commissioner of Works, British Solomon Islands Protectorate.
- Edwin George Davy, Director, Meteorological Department, Mauritius.
- Michael James Fairlie, First Assistant Secretary, Swaziland.
- Joseph George Forsteh, Collector of Customs, Gambia.
- James Warrington Foster, Member of the Civil Service Commission, Bahamas.
- Hywel George, Administrative Officer, North Borneo.
- Gordon Reginald Groves, Director of Agriculture and Fisheries, Bermuda.
- Edmund Albert Hooper, DSC, Wharf Superintendent, the Singapore Harbour Board.
- Arthur Jessop, Transport Consultant, Mauritius.
- Li Fook-shu. For public services in Hong Kong.
- Chief Daniel Leshoboro Majara. For public services in Basutoland.
- Ian Wilson MacKichan, MB, BChir, Permanent Secretary, Ministry of Health, and Director of Medical Services, Zanzibar.
- Noel James Linnington Margetson, MBE, MD, FRCS(Ed.), Consultant Surgeon Specialist, Antigua.
- Gerald Herbert Maule. For services to the theatre in Kenya.
- Aurelius Peter Montegriffo. For public services in Gibraltar.
- Elizabeth Pulane Moremi, MBE, Regent of the Batawana Tribe, Bechuanaland Protectorate.
- Muhoya s/o Kagumba, BEM, Senior Chief, Nyeri District, Kenya.
- Arthur Ralph Vernon Newsam, Headmaster, Lodge School, Barbados.
- Herbert Noble. For public services in Hong Kong.
- Frederick Nigel Moliere Pusinelli, MC, Deputy Financial Secretary, Aden.
- William Donald Randall. For public services in Kenya.
- Jeremiah Reidy, MB, BCh, Senior Medical Officer, Kenya.
- Andre Francois Marcelin Anatole Sauzier, Attorney-General, Seychelles.
- Charles Hudson Southwell, Officer-in-Charge, Community Development Project, Long Lama, Sarawak.
- Janette Mary Azila Stott, Senior Education Officer, Kenya.
- Robin Horton John Thorne, Assistant Chief Secretary, Aden.
- George Baskerville Viveash, lately Commissioner of Police, Aden.
- Walter Ronald Weber, lately Commissioner of Police, British Guiana.
- Frederick Daniel Wesby, JP. For public services in British Honduras.
- Quentin Victor Lee Weston, Assistant Colonial Secretary, Fiji.
- Charles Alexander Winston. For services to Agriculture in Dominica.
- Thomas Cheng Hoe Yeo. For public services in Sarawak.

Southern Rhodesia

- Captain Edward Frederick Boultbee, Honorary Curator of the National Museum, Umtali.
- Robert Huyshe Greaves, formerly a member of the Natural Resources Board.
- Guy Maxwell McGregor, Director of Forestry.
- John Henry McIntosh, Town Clerk of Que Que.

Northern Rhodesia

- William Albert Rawdon Gorman, MC, Under Secretary, Ministry of African Education, Northern Rhodesia.
- Brian George Tucker, Assistant Secretary, Northern Rhodesia.

Nyasaland

- Alan Robert Lodge, Deputy Commissioner of Police, Nyasaland.
- Arthur Richard Westrop, MC. For public services in Nyasaland.

==== Member of the Order of the British Empire (MBE) ====
Military Division

Royal Navy

- Lieutenant-Commander Charles Philip Bowers.
- Lieutenant-Commander (S.D.) Robert Eaton, (Retired).
- Captain Lionel Percy Fox Edwards, Royal Marines.
- Instructor Lieutenant-Commander John Gammon, (Retired).
- Lieutenant (S.D.) John Thomas Headon.
- Lieutenant-Commander James Ivor James.
- Lieutenant (S.D.) Gerald Ralph Lawrance, Malayan Royal Naval Volunteer Reserve.
- Lieutenant-Commander John Mallard, Royal Naval Reserve.
- Lieutenant-Commander Donald Moore, VRD, Malayan Royal Naval Volunteer Reserve.
- Temporary Lieutenant-Commander (S.C.C.) Henry Mulligan, Royal Naval Reserve.
- Instructor Lieutenant-Commander Sidney Arthur Parkin.
- Lieutenant-Commander Arthur Neville Simms, (Retired).
- Lieutenant-Commander Arthur Harold Smith.
- Engineer Lieutenant Albert Harold Taylor.
- Supply Lieutenant Archibald Frank Tribe, (Retired).
- Captain (Acting Major) (S.D.) John Whitty, Royal Marines.

Army

- Captain (Quartermaster) George Allsop (440321), 1st The Queen's Dragoon Guards, Royal Armoured Corps.
- 14461136 Warrant Officer Class I James Kenelm Atkins, Royal Pioneer Corps.
- Captain (acting) Thomas Atkinson (433010), Army Cadet Force.
- 1929561 Warrant Officer Class II Kenneth John Banger, Corps of Royal Engineers.
- 2754930 Warrant Officer Class II Hector George Bell, the Black Watch (Royal Highland Regiment).
- Captain (acting) William Albert Bishop, TD, (65669), Combined Cadet Force.
- 894240 Warrant Officer Class I George William Blavins, Royal Regiment of Artillery.
- Major (local Lieutenant-Colonel) Reginald John Bond (174215), Royal Army Educational Corps.
- Major Ian Cameron, TD, (212781), Royal Regiment of Artillery, Territorial Army (now T.A.R.O).
- Lieutenant-Colonel (temporary) (local Colonel) Alistair Ian Greville Ramsay (69132), The Royal Highland Fusiliers (Princess Margaret's Own Glasgow and Ayrshire Regiment) (now R.A.R.O).
- Major Harry Charlesworth, ERD, (231299), Corps of Royal Engineers, Army Emergency Reserve (now R.A.R.O).
- Major (Quartermaster) Brooke Moody Consitt (282567), Army Physical Training Corps.
- Captain Donald Lamond Coutts, TD, (399514), Intelligence Corps, Territorial Army.
- Captain (District Officer) Carmel D'Anastasi (454201), Royal Malta Artillery.
- Major Ellis Dean, MC, TD, (288761), The Parachute Regiment, Territorial Army.
- Captain (Q.G.O.) Dilbahadur Rai (398033), 10th Princess Mary's Own Gurkha Rifles.
- S/14048958 Warrant Officer Class I John Dunlop, Royal Army Service Corps.
- S/54275 Warrant Officer Class I Thomas Norman Cordell Emery, Royal Army Service Corps.
- Major (Quartermaster) Leonard John Emm (181979), Royal Regiment of Artillery (now R.A.R.O).
- Major Joseph Patrick Fonseca (104837), The Royal Welch Fusiliers (Employed List 3) (now retired).
- Major Jean Gilmour Frame (356416), Women's Royal Army Corps.
- 22544942 Warrant Officer Class I James Francis, North Irish Horse, Royal Armoured Corps, Territorial Army.
- Major (acting) Thomas Symington Halliday (298772), Combined Cadet Force.
- Major (temporary) Lewis James Harper (214309), Royal Army Educational Corps.
- 4105232 Warrant Officer Class II Walter Verdun Healey, The Herefordshire Light Infantry, Territorial Army.
- 6913125 Warrant Officer Class II Wilfred Hennon, The Parachute Regiment.
- 1947393 Warrant Officer Class I Peter Sydney Hitchcock, Military Provost Staff Corps.
- Major Marmaduke Robert Gwynne-Howell (95175), Royal Regiment of Artillery.
- 22283089 Warrant Officer Class II Archibald William Jenkyn, Royal Regiment of Artillery.
- Major (temporary) Claude William Jukes (201091), Royal Army Service Corps (now retired).
- Major (Quartermaster) Harold George King (342448), 11th Hussars (Prince Albert's Own), Royal Armoured Corps.
- Major Andrew Klinghardt, BEM, (350383), Intelligence Corps.
- Major (now Lieutenant-Colonel (temporary)) Thomas Norman Warner Lacey, DFC, (235027), Royal Regiment of Artillery.
- Major Isaac William Little (323997), Royal Army Medical Corps.
- Major George Louden, TD, (402057), Royal Corps of Signals, Territorial Army.
- Major Walter Moorhouse (364677), Corps of Royal Engineers.
- Major Arthur Edwin Murley, TD, (410936), Royal Regiment of Artillery, Territorial Army.
- 305405 Warrant Officer Class I Jack Neill, Royal Horse Guards (The Blues).
- Captain (Quartermaster) Victor Albert Newell (423137), Corps of Royal Engineers.
- Captain (Quartermaster) Harold Henry Norman (455511), 1st East Anglian Regiment (Royal Norfolk and Suffolk).
- The Reverend James O'Sullivan, Chaplain to the Forces, 3rd Class (218718), Royal Army Chaplains' Department.
- Major Gordon Colin Randolph Lithgow Fender (289086), The Royal Highland Fusiliers (Princess Margaret's Own Glasgow and Ayrshire Regiment).
- Major John Petty, MC, (112911), The King's Own Royal Border Regiment.
- S/1509395 Warrant Officer Class I Geoffrey Arthur Reader, Royal Army Service Corps.
- Major (local Lieutenant-Colonel) Leslie Clinton Robinson, TD, (74184), Royal Regiment of Artillery (now R.A.R.O).
- Major Herbert Robert Sawyer (170305), Corps of Royal Military Police, Territorial Army.
- Major Carl Harry Share (246538), Royal Army Pay Corps.
- Major James Howard Smart, MC, (137535), Royal Regiment of Artillery.
- Major Nigel Ian Bartlett Speller (372381), Royal Army Service Corps.
- Major Norman Davies Squire, MC, TD, (97978), Royal Regiment of Artillery.
- Captain (now Major) (Quartermaster) Gwynne John Thomas (428622), 4th/7th Royal Dragoon Guards, Royal Armoured Corps.
- Captain (Quartermaster) Ernest Crewdson Thornborough (450858), Corps of Royal Electrical and Mechanical Engineers.
- Major (Quartermaster) Arthur William Tremlett (420165), Corps of Royal Engineers.
- The Reverend Kenneth Arthur Vine, Chaplain to the Forces, 3rd Class (now 2nd Class) (199020), Royal Army Chaplains' Department, Territorial Army.
- Captain (now Major) (Quartermaster) Francis Wakefield (425678), 3rd Green Jackets, The Rifle Brigade.
- S/234789 Warrant Office Class II Terence Wardle, Royal Army Service Corps.
- Captain (Electrical and Mechanical Officer) Frank White (447636), Corps of Royal Engineers.
- The Reverend William Alfred Winton, TD, Chaplain to the Forces, 3rd Class (74337), Royal Army Chaplains' Department, Territorial Army (now T.A.R.O).
- Major Brian Mitchell (378923), Royal Army Service Corps; serving with the British Joint Services Training Team, Ghana.
- Major Anthony Thomas (378703), Royal Army Service Corps; formerly on loan to the Government of the Federation of Malaya.
- Major John Rodney David Wattenbach (341761), Royal Tank Regiment, Royal Armoured Corps; on loan to the Government of the Federation of Malaya.
- Major John Richard Jordan, ED, Quartermaster, The Barbados Regiment.

Royal Air Force

- Squadron Leader Wilfred Lochiel Aikman, MB, ChB, (180027).
- Squadron Leader Geoffrey Amor (57385).
- Squadron Leader Gordon Barry Atkinson, DFC, (42091).
- Squadron Leader Edward James Baldock (196649), (Retired).
- Squadron Leader Arthur Frederick Pax Beard (143825).
- Squadron Leader John Irfon Davies (4032943).
- Squadron Leader Albert Dunn (171212).
- Squadron Leader (Acting Wing Commander) Robert Ramsden Edwards (200055).
- Squadron Leader Alonzo Fearnside (46603).
- Squadron Leader David Mullarkey (3045930).
- Squadron Leader Dudley Lionel Pinn (579060).
- Squadron Leader William Walton Saunders, AFC, (48572).
- Squadron Leader Edgar Ronald Simmons (57043).
- Squadron Leader Robert Walker Steel (130986).
- Squadron Leader Leslie Norman West (568419).
- Squadron Leader Colin George White (031384), Royal Australian Air Force.
- Acting Squadron Leader Vernon Clare Belding (569384).
- Acting Squadron Leader Lawrence Edward Albert Cook (123387), Royal Air Force Volunteer Reserve (Training Branch).
- Flight Lieutenant Edward Lewis Atkinson (578661).
- Flight Lieutenant Reginald Charles Bayly (185455).
- Flight Lieutenant Dennis Walter de la Rue Browne (55445).
- Flight Lieutenant John Graham De'Ath (607395).
- Flight Lieutenant Geoffrey George Greenstreet (351380).
- Flight Lieutenant Harold Arthur Langridge (591795).
- Flight Lieutenant Edward Henry Lanser (117251), Royal Auxiliary Air Force.
- Flight Lieutenant David Norman Lattimer (614686).
- Flight Lieutenant Frank Mason (4054413).
- Flight Lieutenant George Ronald Otter (638369).
- Acting Flight Lieutenant William Denby Mewis (615149).
- Acting Flight Lieutenant Albert George Simmons (116843), Royal Air Force Volunteer Reserve (Training Branch).
- Master Technician James Vidler (905418).
- Warrant Officer Walter James Brassett (566368).
- Warrant Officer Donald Thomas Frank Crispin (536069).
- Warrant Officer Joseph William Welfare Ford (551315).
- Warrant Officer Reginald Ernest Goyder (1226153).
- Warrant Officer Stanley George Kennett (562562).
- Warrant Officer Eric George Leece (518236).
- Warrant Officer Alfred George Barron Sapsworth (365543).
- Warrant Officer Anthony Edward Shearman (971580).
- Warrant Officer John Albert Smyth (552055).
- Warrant Officer Charles Thomas Wood (512998).

Civil Division

- William Thomas Adams, Executive Officer, War Office.
- John Birnie Allan, Local Youth Adviser, Medway Division, Kent Education Committee.
- The Reverend John Russell Anderson, JP, Chaplain, HM Prison, Barlinnie, Glasgow.
- Richard Lewis Angove, Forces Broadcasting Service Technical Grade III, Station Commander, Tripoli, War Office.
- Cecil Edgar Arnold, Higher Executive Officer, Admiralty.
- William Croll Arthur, Chairman, Glasgow South Side Local Employment Committee.
- Kathleen Florence Bailey, Higher Executive Officer, Department of Scientific and Industrial Research.
- Benja Thomas Baldock. For services to the Association of Waterworks Officers.
- John Barnacoat, Headmaster, Marlborough School, Osnabruck, British Army of the Rhine.
- Frank Walter Barnes, Senior Executive Officer, Worcester Divisional Office, Ministry of Agriculture, Fisheries and Food.
- Thomas Bertram Barnes. For public services in Ince-in-Makerfield and district.
- Fred Bates, Station Superintendent, Thornhill and Huddersfield Power Stations, Yorkshire Division, Central Electricity Generating Board.
- Leonard William Beardsmore, Sales Manager, British Overseas Fairs, Ltd.
- William Henry Beasley, Senior Executive Officer, Air Ministry.
- Cecil Hansford Beere, lately Chief Clerk, Grade I, Edmonton County Court.
- Joan Gumming Bell, District Staff Officer (Nursing Cadets), West Riding of Yorkshire, St. John Ambulance Brigade.
- John Bennett, AFM. For services to the Royal Air Forces Association.
- Lewis Arthur Bennett, Grade 4 Officer, Ministry of Labour.
- Euphemia Anderson Beveridge, Woman Adviser, Logie Junior Secondary School, Dundee.
- Albert George Walter Carl Birs, Higher Executive Officer, Ministry of Housing and Local Government.
- William Charles Blake, Clerk to the Haverhill Urban District Council, West Suffolk.
- Nancy Travers Blampied, Organiser, Guernsey, Channel Islands, Women's Voluntary Service.
- Ernest Bland. For political services.
- William Arthur Boam, Inspector of Mines and Quarries, Durham Division, Ministry of Power.
- Frederick Godfrey Bobin, TD, Executive Officer, Ministry of Pensions and National Insurance.
- Percival Whitaker Bond, Honorary Secretary, Bingley Savings Committee.
- Harold Thornton Booth, Higher Executive Officer, Ministry of Pensions and National Insurance.
- Henry William Boutall, Senior Engineer (Contracts), Independent Television Authority.
- Leslie John Brading, Engineer II, Atomic Energy Establishment, Winfrith, United Kingdom Atomic Energy Authority.
- Harold Bradley, Chairman, Darwen Local Employment Committee.
- Alderman John Bradley, JP. For public services in Swinton and Pendlebury.
- Benjamin Braim, District Secretary, Hull District, Amalgamated Society of Woodworkers.
- George Brankin, Technical Assistant, Grade II, Department of Agriculture and Fisheries for Scotland.
- Joseph Patrick Breen, Chief Engineer, Patons & Baldwins Ltd., Darlington.
- Harry Charles Moore-Bridger, Music Teacher, Oswestry High Schools, Shropshire.
- Frances Eleanor Brockington, Executive Officer, Ministry of Health.
- Robert Brodie, Area Manager, Dundee (West), National Assistance Board.
- Margery Castleman Brown, Clothing Organiser, Eastern Region, Women's Voluntary Service.
- Frederick Bruce, Manager, Croydon Employment Exchange, Ministry of Labour.
- Thomas Whitson Buchanan, lately Chairman, Scottish Standing Committee, Pharmaceutical General Council (Scotland).
- Cecil Frederick Buckingham, Higher Executive Officer, Ministry of Pensions and National Insurance.
- Oliver Charles Budd, Chief Officer, Preston Fire Brigade.
- Thomas Victor Bull, Commercial Manager, The Electric Construction Co. Ltd., Wolverhampton.
- Frederick James Burman, Engineer II, Ministry of Aviation.
- Charles Frederick Burrell, Superintendent of Stores, Board of Customs and Excise.
- James Campbell. For political services.
- Alexander Cant. For political services in Cowdenbeath.
- George Alfred Carnill, Chief Superintendent, Sheffield City Police.
- Frank Robbie Castle, General Secretary, Working Men's Club and Institute Union, Ltd.
- Ella Ross Chadwick, Divisional President, Kidderminster Division, Worcestershire Branch, British Red Cross Society.
- Captain John Falkland Champion, Master, MV Harmattan, J. & C. Harrison Ltd., London.
- Arnold Sigfred Christensen, Estate Manager and Farmer, Sussex.
- Aleice Mary Clewer. For public services in Leyton.
- Charles Ernest Clews, Chief Draughtsman, Admiralty.
- Eva Beatrice Collins, Part-time Staff Nurse, Cuckfield Hospital, Sussex.
- Gilbert Gordon Harry Cook, Area Superintendent, Northern Region, Commonwealth War Graves Commission.
- Major Arthur James Coomber, Chairman, Bromley, Sevenoaks and District War Pensions Committee.
- Arthur Roberts Cork, Deputy Production Manager, Electric & Musical Industries Ltd., Hayes, Middlesex.
- Squadron Leader William Cox, Member, No. 1054 (Llanelly) Squadron Committee, Air Training Corps.
- Violet Emily Crawley. For political services in Bedfordshire.
- Agnes Maria Cronin, Typist, Ministry of Defence.
- Frederick William Crowder, JP, Member, Birmingham District Advisory Committee, Midland Regional Board for Industry.
- Oliver Alfred Sidney Cutts. For services to Sport.
- Robert Frederick Daffey, Personnel Manager, Saro (Anglesey) Ltd., Beaumaris, Anglesey.
- Idris Tegwyn Davies, Purser-Radio Officer, SS Jason, Alfred Holt & Co. Liverpool.
- Margaret Eluned Davies, lately Headmistress, Gellideg Infants School, Merthyr Tydfil.
- Katharine Marjorie Tindale Davis, lately Senior Executive Officer, Foreign Office.
- William Henry Dawkes, Inspector of Taxes, Board of Inland Revenue.
- Ira Albert Denning, District Commissioner for National Savings, Plymouth.
- George Alfred Donald Denyer, Voluntary Youth Worker in Surrey.
- Marjorie Dickinson, Headmistress, Stradbroke County Infants School, Sheffield.
- Herbert Matthew Dickson, Chief Scientific Intelligence Officer, Civil Defence, Lincolnshire (Parts of Holland).
- Hilda Margaret Dinsmore, Librarian, Houses of Parliament, Northern Ireland.
- Observer Commander Thomas William Dobson, Group Commandant, No. 23 Group, Durham, Royal Observer Corps.
- Ernest George Down, Station Master, Waterloo and Waterloo and City Railway Stations.
- Arthur Robert Dudgeon, Senior Executive Officer, Air Ministry.
- John Dudleston. For services to the Boy Scouts Association in Birkenhead.
- Albert Charles Dudley, Assistant Supervisor of Scrutineers, Government Communications Headquarters, Foreign Office.
- Arthur George Dunn, ED, Engineer II, War Office.
- Robert Wilson Dunn, Divisional Officer (Grade II), South-Eastern Area Fire Brigade, Scotland.
- Gilbert Dyson, Higher Executive Officer, Ministry of Pensions and National Insurance.
- Irene Monica Harries Easton, Grade 5 Officer, Branch B, Foreign Office.
- Mary Rosalie Jane Edwards, Chief Exhibition Officer, British Museum (Natural History).
- Noel Elliott, HM Electrical Inspector of Factories, Ministry of Labour.
- Doris Harwood Ellis. For political services in Workington.
- George Evans, Civil Defence Officer, Buckinghamshire.
- George Meredith Evans, Contracts Manager (Aero), Bristol Siddeley Engines Ltd., Filton, Bristol.
- Charles James Fairfull, Principal Executive Officer, Metropolitan Police Force.
- Grace Muriel Burdwood Falkus, Chairman, Benfleet Savings Committee.
- Kenneth William Faulk, Group Secretary, Finance Officer and Supplies Officer, Netherne Hospital Management Committee, Surrey.
- Christina Pearson Fleming. For political services in Paisley.
- Doris Vera Fleming, Welfare Worker, Women's Voluntary Service, Royal Australian Air Force Base, Butterworth, Penang, Malaya.
- James Westwood Fordham, Research Assistant, Bethnal Green Museum, Ministry of Education.
- Charles Ernest Forryan, Superintendent Engineer, United Birmingham Hospitals.
- John Bellamy Furneaux Foster, Senior Executive Officer, Central Office of Information.
- Mary Frances Foster, Clerical Officer (Secretary), Commonwealth Relations Office.
- Elsie May Foulds, Vice-chairman, Women's Section, British Legion.
- John Marcus Fox. For political services in Yorkshire.
- Lieutenant-Colonel Ronald Allen France, TD, DL, lately Chairman, Wigan National Assistance Appeal Tribunal.
- Douglas Cecil Frost, Engineer, Technician I, Foreign Office.
- Jane Fry, lately Superintendent Radiographer, Royal Northern Hospital.
- Archibald Gillespie, Crofting Adviser, North of Scotland College of Agriculture.
- Jacqueline Victoria Gilmore, Lady Visitor, Public Trustee Office.
- Ellen Gertrude Godfrey, lately Assistant Case Secretary, Distressed Gentlefolk's Aid Association.
- Henry Golding. For political services in London.
- George Frederick Gilbert Goody, Higher Executive Officer, Department of Scientific and Industrial Research.
- Alexander Grant, MM, lately Clerical Officer, Regimental Pay Office, Scottish Command.
- Hugh Stanley Green, Chairman, Ipswich Unit, Sea Cadet Corps.
- Sarah Jane Melba Griffiths, Chief Clerk, Territorial and Auxiliary Forces Associations for the Counties of Carmarthen, Pembroke and Cardigan.
- Gordon Guttridge, Chairman, Poultry Sub-Committee, Hertfordshire Agricultural Executive Committee.
- Ronald Peter Hackett, Higher Executive Officer, General Register Office.
- Edward Francis Hammond, Senior Executive Officer, Board of Trade.
- Harold John Charles Hampton, Senior Executive Officer, Ministry of Pensions and National Insurance.
- Alan George Hancock, lately Assistant Secretary, Royal Institution of Chartered Surveyors.
- Sybil Irene Harris. For political and public services in Flintshire.
- Arthur William Harvey, Skipper of the diesel electric trawler, Argo of Pembroke.
- Samuel John Harvey, Accountant and Assistant Secretary, Belfast City and District Water Commissioners.
- Albert Kenyon Haslam, Head Postmaster, Dover.
- Mary Elsa Hawker. For political services in Shropshire.
- David Andrews Hawthorne, lately Honorary Secretary, Olderfleet Primary School Savings Group, Larne, County Antrim.
- May Edith Hay. For political services in Ilford.
- Herbert Heginbotham, Organiser, Youth Employment and Welfare Branch, Birmingham Education Committee.
- Donald Edward Herbert Hellings, Higher Executive Officer, Commonwealth Relations Office.
- Molly Balvaird Hewett, Honorary Secretary, Interval Club, Ltd.
- Ruby Ashford Hickman, Headmistress, Silverhill Special School, Newcastle upon Tyne.
- Irene Minnie Dorothy Higgins, ARRC, Principal Matron of Epping Group of Hospitals.
- Edna Rose Hill, Higher Clerical Officer, Foreign Office.
- John Hill, Chairman, Western District Committee, Devon Agricultural Executive Committee.
- Stella Wedderburn Ogilvie Hillier, Features Organiser (Sound Broadcasting), British Broadcasting Corporation.
- Harold William Hockley, Chief Instrument Designer, Crompton Parkinson (Chelmsford) Ltd., Essex.
- Charles Henry Frank Hodsoll, Technical Officer I, Receiver's Office.
- James Holme, Farmer and Breeder of pedigree dairy Shorthorn cattle, North of England.
- Evelyn Frances Holmes, Clerical Officer (Secretary), Exchequer and Audit Department.
- Alderman Charles Crapper Holt. For political and public services in Lancashire.
- Joseph Scott Horne, Member, Croydon and District Disablement Advisory Committee.
- Harold Redvers Horrabin, Inspector of Taxes, Board of Inland Revenue.
- William Howarth, Chairman, Warrington, Widnes and District War Pensions Committee.
- Clifford Bowen Hughes, Clerk to the Llanelly Rural District Council.
- Frederick Hunnisett, lately Executive Officer, Air Ministry.
- Thomas Murray Hunter, Chairman and Managing Director, T. M. Hunter Ltd., (Woollen Manufacturers).
- Thomas Irwin, lately Chief Draughtsman (Engine Detail Drawing Office), John Brown & Co. (Clydebank) Ltd.
- Walter James Jagelman, Clerical Officer, Ministry of Transport.
- Walter Leslie Jagger, attached War Office.
- Haydn Edward James, Principal Probation Officer, Hertfordshire.
- Edith Chester Johnson, Home Sister, Royal Buckinghamshire Hospital, Aylesbury.
- Ruth Elizabeth Marr-Johnson, Executive Officer, Ministry of Aviation.
- Gwyneth Jones. For political and public services in Denbighshire.
- Margaret Mary Jones, Higher Clerical Officer, HM Stationery Office.
- Digby Percy Jordan, Divisional Officer, Hampshire Fire Brigade.
- Stanley George Jorden. For political services in Peckham.
- Kenneth George Keeble, lately Higher Executive Officer, Admiralty.
- John Kellett, Group Mechanical Engineer, "A" Group, Durham Division, National Coal Board.
- John James Kelly, Assistant Division Officer, Ordnance Survey.
- Albert William King, Finance Officer, Institution of Gas Engineers.
- Francis Leighton King, Member, and lately Secretary, Perth Local Committee, St. Andrew's Ambulance Association.
- Albert Kirk, Technical Secretary, British Federation of Master Printers.
- Henry de Boyne Knight, Consultant, Gas Discharge Engineering, Associated Electrical Industries Research Laboratory, Rugby, Warwickshire.
- Alfred Harold Knox, Secretary, West Lancashire Wing Welfare Committee, Air Training Corps.
- Piotr Maciej Kozlowski, Principal Survey Officer, Department of Technical Co-operation.
- William Patrick Laing, Senior Ship Surveyor, Marine Survey (East of Scotland) Office.
- Ernest George Lashmar, Engineer Manager, Barclay Curie & Co. Ltd., Glasgow.
- Wilfrid George Latcham, Estate Surveyor, Ministry of Public Building and Works.
- Wilfred Laverick, Chairman, Kennington Divisional Savings Committee.
- John Leckenby, Clerical Officer, Headquarters, Northern Command, War Office.
- Percy Ormsby Lennon, Security Officer, Grade II, Ministry of Aviation.
- Commander Robert George Liveing, Royal Navy (Retired), Command Naval Auxiliary Officer (Home), Office of Commander-in-Chief, Portsmouth.
- James Edgar Grant Lockhart, Superintendent and Deputy Chief Constable, Coatbridge Burgh Police.
- Richard Percy Lockyer, Clerical Officer, Board of Trade.
- Walter Sheard Long, Chief Experimental Officer, Atomic Weapons Research Establishment, United Kingdom Atomic Energy Authority.
- Thomas Alfred Luck, MM, lately Welfare and Security Officer, Brymbo Steel Works, G.K.N. Steel Co. Ltd., Denbighshire.
- Emily Adamson Gumming Lyle, Chief Superintendent of Typists, Scottish Home and Health Department.
- John McAuslan, Chief Draughtsman, Admiralty Drawing Office, Harland & Wolff Ltd., Belfast.
- Robert Meredith McCrory, Commandant, No. 4 District Police Training Centre, Ryton-on-Dunsmore, Warwickshire.
- James McDonald, Secretary, Northern Ireland, British and Foreign Bible Society.
- Stuart McDonald, Press Officer, British Information Services, Sydney, Commonwealth Relations Office.
- Peter Stevens Macgregor, Assistant Chief Engineer, Flight Refuelling Ltd., Tarrant Rushton Airfield, Blandford, Dorset.
- Alistair Ian McIntyre. For services to the tourist industry in Inverness-shire.
- Euphemia McLauchlan, President, Oban and District Old People's Welfare Committee, Argyllshire.
- Malcolm Archy Macleod, Headmaster, Lochmaddy Primary School, North Uist.
- Hugh MacMillan, Head Forester, Forestry Commission (Scotland).
- William McNeill, Deputy Surveyor, Down County Council.
- Christina Janet Mactavish, Clerical Officer (Secretary), Ministry of Housing and Local Government.
- Arthur Manley, JP, Assistant Secretary, Historic Buildings Council for Wales, Ministry of Public Building and Works.
- Albert Henry Margree, Senior Professional Accountant, Ministry of Power.
- Constance Maud Marston, Senior Executive Officer, Ministry of Agriculture, Fisheries and Food.
- The Reverend William Martin, Organizing Secretary in Scotland, British Sailors Society.
- Clarence George May, lately Editor of Poultry World.
- William George Mearns, Assistant Head Postmaster, Aberdeen.
- Inns Matthew Merry, Actuary, Wigan Trustee Savings Bank.
- Kenneth Stuart Miles, Senior Experimental Officer, Ministry of Aviation.
- Percy Bryant King Miller, Inspector, Aeronautical Inspection Service, Air Ministry.
- Norman Mitchell, Honorary Secretary and Treasurer, Macclesfield and Prestbury Divisions, Soldiers', Sailors' and Airmen's Families Association.
- George Albert Thomas Monk, Plant Engineer, Telecommunication Division, Associated Electrical Industries Ltd., Hartlepools Trading Estate.
- Frederick Morgan, Assistant Ship Manager, Cammell Laird & Co. (Shipbuilders & Engineers) Ltd., Birkenhead.
- George Albert Morgan, lately Chief Public Health Inspector, Borough of Port Talbot, Glamorgan.
- William Patrick Morton. For services to hospitals in Belfast.
- George James Moyse, lately Honorary Secretary and Treasurer, Zeebrugge (1918) Association.
- Frances Nesbitt Nairne. For political services in Hampshire.
- Maude Euthalie Newsom. For political services in Lancashire.
- Robert Augustus Newsom, MRCS, LRCP, lately Surgeon, MV Capetown Castle, British & Commonwealth Shipping Co. Ltd., London.
- William Edgar Nobbs, Senior Foreman (Engineering), (Technical Grade A), HM Dockyard, Rosyth.
- Ewart Price Northwood, Press Officer, Ulster Office, London.
- Joan Norwood, Matron, Oakwell Geriatric Hospital, Leeds.
- Harry Oakley, Engineer Technician, Grade B, Foreign Office.
- Sydney Lloyd Oldfield, Chief Preventive Officer, Board of Customs and Excise.
- Dorothy Winifred Lilian Oliver, Higher Executive Officer, Civil Service Commission.
- Frederick William Palmer, BEM, Principal Foreman of Storehouses, Victualling Department, Gosport, Admiralty.
- Percy Norman Parker, BEM, Senior Executive Engineer, General Post Office.
- Winifred Mabel Pates, Church Army Sister, British Army of the Rhine.
- James Pattie, Test Areas Works Engineer, Rolls-Royce Ltd., Spadeadam, Cumberland.
- William Bruce Paul, Chief Engineer, SS Baron Inverclyde, H. Hogarth & Sons Ltd., Glasgow.
- Henry James Gregory Pearce, Honorary Secretary, Bromley Local Savings Committee.
- Frederick William Pedler, Assistant Engineer, Telephone Manager's Office, Sheffield.
- Wilfred Peel, Area Manager, Newcastle (North), National Assistance Board.
- Nellie Pegg (Mrs Green). Lately Secretary and Treasurer, National Joint Industrial Council for the Cement Manufacturing Industry.
- Caroline Emily Pegge, Shorthand Typist, Export Credits Guarantee Department.
- Stanley Redvers Pettit, Chief Clerk, County Surveyor's Department, Cambridgeshire.
- William Donald Pirie, Higher Executive Officer, Ministry of Pensions and National Insurance.
- Albert Pirnie, Pharmacist and Chief Instructor, Army School of Dispensing.
- Cecily Matcham Pledger, Deputy Director, Pay and Records Department, British Council.
- Catherine Maude Potter. For political and public services in Glasgow.
- Thomas Joseph Povey. For political services in Holland-with-Boston.
- Adam Stanley Prentice, Television Film Cameraman, British Broadcasting Corporation.
- Charles Price, Manager, Lewis District, North of Scotland Hydro-Electric Board.
- James Gilbert Price, Senior Executive Officer, General Post Office.
- Samuel Price, Engineer (Maintenance), South Eastern Division, British Transport Commission.
- Eileen Pringle, Honorary Secretary, Civilian Committee, St. Marylebone Unit, Sea Cadet Corps.
- George William Prior, Superintendent, Air Ministry Constabulary, Royal Aircraft Establishment, Farnborough.
- Jessica Mary Pritchatt, Valuation Clerk (Higher Grade), Board of Inland Revenue.
- Gwilym Noah Pugh, Chairman, West District Committee, Glamorgan Agricultural Executive Committee.
- Thomas Alfred Purcell. For public and social services in Tees-side.
- John Murdow Purves, MC, Bible Class Teacher, HM Prison, Edinburgh.
- Robert Kitchener Victor Pye, Senior Collector of Fisheries Statistics, Ministry of Agriculture, Fisheries and Food.
- Rene James Quinault, Programme Organiser, English by Radio (European Services), British Broadcasting Corporation.
- Samuel Radford, lately Chief Superintendent and Deputy Chief Constable, Salford City Police.
- Hugh Ramsay, Senior, Chairman, Kincardineshire Local Savings Committee.
- Samuel Geoffrey Ratcliff, JP, Chairman, Braintree Rural District Council.
- Walter John Reed, TD, Manager, Washwood Heath Employment Exchange, Ministry of Labour.
- William Ramsey Reid, District Inspector, Royal Ulster Constabulary.
- Anthony Clayton Rice, Drainage Engineer, Chelmsford Region, Ministry of Agriculture, Fisheries and Food.
- Alfred George Henry Richards, Regional Collector of Taxes, Board of Inland Revenue.
- Charles William Richardson, Higher Executive Officer, Home Office.
- Dorothy Emily Richardson, Secretary, Church Army Housing Ltd.
- Edward Clarence Redvers Richardson, Senior Executive Officer, War Office.
- Robert Alexander Richey, lately Chief Inspector of Weights and Measures, Ministry of Commerce, Northern Ireland.
- Dorothy Janet Richman, Higher Executive Officer, Ministry of Transport.
- Major Leonard Richmond, DSO. For political services in Bebington.
- Frederick Albert Riddett, Chairman, Islington North and West Branch, British Legion.
- Amos Rivers, Senior Accountant, Board of Trade.
- John Brown Robb, Chairman, Stirling National Assistance Appeal Tribunal.
- Alexander Roberts, BEM, Chairman, Consett, Blaydon and District War Pensions Committee.
- Arthur David Macleod Robinson, Clerk of the Richmond Charities.
- Jack Catto Rockley, Chemist II, Ministry of Aviation.
- Reuben Rodgers, BEM, Member of Local Committee, Portsmouth Branch, Royal Naval Benevolent Trust.
- Melinda Olive Rose, Clerical Officer (Secretary), HM Treasury.
- Eileene Mary Rosling, Member of the Secretariat, British Coal Utilisation Association.
- Ernest Francis Routley, lately Chief Wireless Technician, Home Office.
- Robert Arthur Rowden, Head of Field Strength Section, Engineering Research Department, British Broadcasting Corporation.
- Donald Rowe, Deputy County Advisory Officer, Grade II, National Agricultural Advisory Service.
- Stella Ivy Rowe, Deputy Sister, Morgannwg Psychiatric Hospital, Bridgend, Glamorgan (Died 14 December 1962).
- Observer Commander John Buchanan Russell, Group Commandant, No. 21 Group, Preston, Royal Observer Corps.
- John Richard Russell, Civil Defence Officer, Walsall.
- Michael Sacco, Civilian Officer, Air Headquarters, Malta.
- Ada Irene St. Vincent, Chief Superintendent of Typists, Air Ministry.
- Geoffrey Edward Salisbury. For services to the education of the blind in the Commonwealth overseas.
- James Bell Salmond, Inspector of Taxes, Board of Inland Revenue.
- Fred Sanders, Honorary Secretary, Rochdale Local Savings Committee.
- John Edmund Schofield, Library Adviser, Public Libraries (Nigeria), British Council.
- John Scott. For public services in Berkshire.
- Percy Harry Essery Scougall, Foreman, Electrical Branch, Technical Grade I, Navy Works Department, Devonport, Admiralty.
- Hester Maude Shaw. For political services in Surrey.
- Annie Mary Sheehan, Senior Executive Officer, Ministry of Education.
- Arthur Edmond Silverlock, Engineer II (Assistant Manager), Royal Ordnance Factory, Woolwich.
- Frederick Robert Simmonds, lately Chairman, Birmingham Industrial Savings Committee.
- Doris Annie Simpson, Headmistress, Lincoln Gardens County Infants School, Scunthorpe.
- Susan Margaret Sinclair, Clerical Officer (Secretary), Glasgow University Air Squadron.
- Charles Arthur Smallman, Honorary Secretary, Birmingham Municipal Officers' Guild.
- Brinley Charles Smith, Senior Executive Officer, Savings Department, General Post Office.
- Ernest Smith, Divisional Officer, London Fire Brigade.
- Leonard Herbert Smith, Executive Member, Booker Group Social Policy Committee.
- Percy Freeman Smith, 3rd Class Clerk, Bankruptcy and Companies Department, Supreme Court of Judicature.
- Muriel Smith Somerville, Regional Transport Officer, North Eastern Region, Women's Voluntary Service.
- John Stanley Edward Spooner, Senior Chief Clerk, Board of Customs and Excise.
- Thomas Stake, JP, lately District Reporter, Middlesbrough.
- Mary Ethel Stanton, Assistant to the Director, Shipping Federation Ltd.
- Percy Henry Steer, General Production Research Manager, Kearney & Trecker-CVA Ltd.
- Joseph Stewart, Chairman, Strabane Rural District Council, County Tyrone.
- Mona Stewart, Schools Meals Organiser, County Down Education Committee.
- Eleanor Winifred Stiff, Part-time Voluntary Officer, Nursing Section, Joint Committee Ex-Services War Disabled Help Department, British Red Cross Society.
- Helen Margaret Stirling. For political services in the East Riding of Yorkshire.
- John Straughan, Safety Officer, Smith's Dock Co. Ltd., North Shields.
- James William Stuchfield, Clerk to the Traffic Commissioners, Eastern Traffic Area, Ministry of Transport.
- The Reverend Francis Graham Beauchant Sutherland, Officiating Roman Catholic Chaplain to the Forces, Royal Victoria Hospital, Netley, Hampshire.
- Harold Edgar Swain. For political and public services in Staffordshire.
- Annie Taylor. For political services in Derbyshire.
- Elizabeth Thomas, County Borough Organiser, Cardiff, Women's Voluntary Service.
- Herbert Francis Baldwin Thomas, Chairman and Honorary Secretary, Lancashire Schools' Cricket Association.
- Samuel Thorburn, Grade 4 Officer, Ministry of Labour.
- Eileen Caroline Duncan Tinker, JP. For voluntary social services in the West Riding of Yorkshire.
- Frederick Travis, Chief Designer, Naval Armament, Vickers-Armstrongs (Engineers) Ltd., Newcastle upon Tyne.
- Frederick Ernest Tribe, Fire and Civil Defence Officer, Glamorgan, British Overseas Airways Corporation.
- Arthur Edward Tucker, Accountant, Territorial and Auxiliary Forces Association for the County of Cambridge and Isle of Ely.
- Cecil Vance, District Organiser (Ballymena, County Antrim), Amalgamated Transport and General Workers' Union.
- Albert Edward Vyse. For services to Agriculture in Cambridgeshire.
- John Walsh, JP, Alderman, Whitehaven Borough Council.
- Doris Ethelwyn Walton. For political services in Leicester.
- Charles Bernard Ward, District Secretary (Middlesbrough), Transport and General Workers' Union.
- Lieutenant-Colonel Charles Warren. For political and public services in Gloucestershire.
- Horace Warwick, Higher Executive Officer, Ministry of Pensions and National Insurance.
- Thomas James Watson. For political services in County Fermanagh.
- William Watson, Supervising Engineer (Higher Technical Grade "B"), Ministry of Public Building and Works.
- Gwendoline Maude Waugh. For social services in Cumberland.
- Edmund Reay White, Honorary Treasurer, South Shields Savings Committee.
- George Clement Whittick, Inspector of Air Raid Warnings, Northern Sector, Warning and Monitorising Organisation.
- John Ellis Williams, Writer in Welsh.
- Arthur Harvey Willitt, Assistant Engineer, Telephone Manager's Office, Chester.
- Frank Winfield, Treasurer, Great Ouse River Board.
- James Lockley Winskill, Senior Superintendent (Higher Executive Officer), Mercantile Marine Office, Liverpool, Ministry of Transport.
- Frank Winterbottom. For public services in the Sheffield area.
- Edgar John Wood, Higher Executive Officer, Army Record Office, York.
- Ernest Wood. For services to youth in Cheshire.
- Percy Wood, Head Teacher, Cholmondeley County Primary School, Cheshire.
- James Woodhouse, Experimental Officer, Ministry of Aviation.
- Robert Noel Woodley, Grade 3 Officer, Ministry of Labour.
- Alderman Kathleen Laidlow Wright. For political and public services in Middlesex.
- Percy Lewis Waite Wright, JP, Managing Director, Barrhead Kid Co. Ltd., Renfrewshire.
- Thomas Wright. For political and public services in Musselburgh.
- Lewis Yeates, JP, South Western Trade Union Representative, National Industrial Advisory Savings Committee.
- Geoffrey Bernard Youard, Technical Works Officer, Grade B, Agricultural Land Service.
- Captain James Rowan Young, Chief Clerk, Territorial and Auxiliary Forces Association for the County of Fife.
- The Right Honourable Evelyn Margaret, Viscountess Younger of Leckie, County Organiser, Stirlingshire, Women's Voluntary Service.
- William Alcock, Head of Fairey Service Aviation Mission, Surabaja.
- Eric Leslie Bailey, Temporary Grade 4 Officer in Branch B of Her Majesty's Foreign Service, Her Majesty's Embassy, Bonn.
- Donald Brammer, lately Director, Bahrain Government Electricity Department.
- Lieutenant-Colonel Nigel Philip Browne, Officer attached to British Military Government, Berlin.
- Mariquita Cecilia Masjuan-Bush, lately Shorthand-typist, Her Majesty's Embassy, Madrid.
- Ruth Lilian Pauline Clark, British subject lately resident in Israel.
- Leonard Albert Coles, lately Archivist, Her Majesty's Embassy, Leopoldville.
- George William Gregory, Translator, Her Majesty's Embassy, Tokyo.
- Mary Furley Harrison, Teacher at Ahliyya Girls' School, Amman.
- George Herd, British subject resident in Peru.
- Angus Mackay Irvine, British subject resident in Cuba.
- Mary Stewart Irvine, British Vice-Consul, Valparaiso.
- Michael Christopher King, lately Field Representative in Greece of the World Council of Churches.
- Sidney John Lovell, lately First Secretary (Administration Officer), United Kingdom Mission, to the United Nations, Geneva.
- Hamid Reza (Hans Raj) Mahajan, Accountant and Administrative Assistant, British Council, Meshed.
- Marie Pauline Germaine Montel, British Pro-Consul, Marseilles.
- Canon Reginald Basil Ney, Chaplain, Her Majesty's Embassy, Madrid.
- Mary Agnes Parczewski, lately Headmistress, St. Hilda's College for Girls, Hurlingham, Buenos Aires.
- Alice Elizabeth Rodwell, Shorthand-Typist, Her Majesty's Embassy, Washington.
- The Reverend Cyril Harry Sharp, Chaplain of the Missions to Seamen and Vicar of the Church of St. Thomas a Becket, Hamburg.
- Winnefred Snape, British subject resident in Brazil.
- Emmanuel Tragoutsi, Clerical Officer, Her Majesty's Embassy, Athens.
- Dorothy Janette Ure, lately Personal Assistant to Her Majesty's Consul-General, Algiers.
- Edward James Webb, British Vice-Consul, Rome.
- William Rupert Williams, Her Majesty's Vice-Consul, Bergen.
- Robert Auld, formerly Superintendent, Royal Federation of Malaya Police.
- Kathleen Hope Barnes, ARRC, District Nursing Superintendent, Silver Chain District and Bush Nursing Association, State of Western Australia.
- Mabel Livinia Bond, of Leongatha, State of Victoria. For social welfare services.
- Patrick Alfred Joseph Bosustow, Headmaster of the Junior School, Nicosia, Cyprus.
- Sheila Brentnall, Chief Clerk, Makerere University College, Kampala, Uganda.
- Hugh Latimer Broad, formerly Deputy Superintendent, Royal Federation of Malaya Police.
- Peter Edmond Malcolm Brown, Superintendent, Yatala Labor Prison, State of South Australia.
- Stanley John Brown, formerly Assistant Superintendent, Royal Federation of Malaya Police.
- Victoria Buntine, of St. Kilda, State of Victoria. For services to the community.
- Alicia Byrne, Head Teacher, Pleasant Creek Special School for Children, State of Victoria.
- Hugh McFarlane Cameron, in recognition of his-services as a Councillor. For Shire and Town Councils, State of Victoria.
- Horace Arthur Colless. For services to ex-servicemen in Maroubra, State of New South Wales.
- Florence Mary Hunt-Cooke, of Lyndoch, State of South Australia. For social welfare services.
- Richard Charles Drew, Mayor of Dalby, State of Queensland.
- Jennie Florence Forrester. For services to Education in the field of English teaching in India.
- Norah Elizabeth Glegg, formerly Headmistress, Junior School, Lawrence College, Ghoragali (Murree Hills), West Pakistan.
- Mary Gunn, Organising Secretary, City of Sydney Eisteddfod, State of New South Wales.
- Venetia Holley, of Mount Isa, State of Queensland. For charitable and community work in North West Queensland.
- Hazel Honeyman. For services to charitable organisations in the State of Victoria.
- Frederick Leonard King, General Manager, Royal Automobile Club, State of Queensland.
- Alexander Joseph Leckie. For services to Music in the State of Western Australia.
- Iris Leonora Lush, Chairman of the House Committee of the Victoria League.
- Henry Thomas McGee. For community service in the City of Launceston, State of Tasmania.
- Kenneth Donald Mackay, of Brisbane, State of Queensland. For services to Cricket.
- Philippus Lodewicus Malan, lately Works Assistant (Locomotive), Executive "B", East African Railways and Harbours.
- Douglas Gould Mather. For services to local government in the State of New South Wales.
- Percival Joseph Mitchell. For services to social welfare movements in the State of Victoria.
- Frank Laurence Moon, lately Aviation Assistant, Directorate of Civil Aviation, East Africa.
- Elsie Morriss, formerly Principal, Adelaide Girls' High School, State of South Australia.
- Freda Audrey Nixon, Brigadier, Salvation Army, Matron of the Hillcrest Hospital, Merewether, State of New South Wales.
- Bridget O'Sullivan. For services to children in the field of Education, State of Queensland.
- Margaret Jane Poole, of Kyneton, State of Victoria. For social welfare services.
- Edward Joseph Portley, Mayor of Warwick, State of Queensland.
- Mary Courtenay Puckey, MB, ChM, General Superintendent, Rachel Forster Hospital for Women and Children, Sydney, State of New South Wales.
- Irene Vera Rattray, in recognition of her contribution to British social service in Bombay, India.
- Frederick Harold Reed. For services to the Police-Citizens Boys' Club movement in the State of New South Wales.
- Ernest Samuel Reeve, of Portland, State of Victoria. For services to ex-servicemen.
- Blanche Rowntree. For services to the Blind in the State of Tasmania.
- Frederick Eden Selwyn Scott, JP. For services to Agriculture in the State of Victoria.
- Major Jack Sharp, Australian Military Forces (Retired List), Chairman of the Committee of the Royal Shipwreck Relief and Humane Society, State of New South Wales.
- Alfred Charles Shedley, Chairman of the National Parks Board, and of the Zoological Gardens Board, State of Western Australia.
- Maud Shepherd. For services to ex-servicemen and women in the State of New South Wales.
- Helen Rosalie Slawson, Jobarpar Dispensary, Bakerganj District, Pakistan.
- Frank Osmond Venning, of Mooloolaba, State of Queensland. For services to the cause of Life Saving.
- Hugh Philip Antony Walker, Acting Principal Assistant Secretary (Service), Ministry of Education, Federation of Malaya.
- James Graham Walker, Chairman of the Longreach Shire Council, State of Queensland.
- John Deucher Neil Waugh, of Quilpie, (State of Queensland. For services to local government.
- Dora Wood, of Glen Osmond, State of South Australia. For social welfare services.
- Vaughan Albert Wright, formerly Controller of Telecommunications (Mechanical), Telecommunications Department, Federation of Malaya.
- Elizabeth Appleby, Senior Assistant Librarian, Bermuda.
- Donald Oliver Astwood. For public services in the Turks and Caicos Islands.
- Dorothy Victoria Bayley. For public services in British Guiana.
- Rachel Violet Carrol, JP. For public services in Gambia.
- Catherine Chan Oi Yan. For public services in North Borneo.
- Stanley Chester, Education Officer, Kenya.
- George Augustus Classen, Chief Engineer, Technical Branch, Board of Agriculture, Kenya.
- Roderick Alastair Hugh Cowan, Deputy Superintendent of Police, Singapore.
- Charles Gustave De Comarmond. For public services in Seychelles.
- Steven Dubois, Registrar, High Court for the Western Pacific in the New Hebrides.
- Daniel Stanley Dutton, Superintendent of Prisons, Singapore.
- Valerie Pamela Easton, Health Visitor, North Borneo.
- Lee Alfonzo Ebanks, JP, Collector of Customs, Cayman Islands.
- Hubert Nathaniel Chapman-Edwards. For services to Music in British Guiana.
- Arthur James Carfax-Foster. For public services in Fiji.
- Alexander Lundie Gordon, Senior Superintendent of Police, Hong Kong.
- Edward Kenneth Gordon, Principal, Men's Teacher Training Centre, Aden.
- Norvell Elton Allenby Harrigan, Secretary to Government, British Virgin Islands.
- Margaret Mary Helen Gibson-Hill, MRCS, LRCP, lately Medical Officer-in-Charge, Blood Transfusion Service, Singapore.
- Hugh Henry Baines Murray-Hudson, Administrative Officer, Bechuanaland Protectorate.
- Robert Geoffrey Wilfred Hudson. For public services in Kenya.
- Ecosse Humbert, Education Officer, Mauritius.
- George Jamuh, Assistant Curator, Sarawak Museum.
- Seanoa Ka, Assistant Medical Officer, Gilbert and Ellice Islands Colony.
- Abdul Habbib Sahu Khan. For public services in Fiji.
- Uraia Nayacalevu Koroi. For public services in Fiji.
- Bobbie Madeleine Florence Kotewall. For public services in Hong Kong.
- William Cecil Low, Deputy Registrar, District Court, Kowloon, Hong Kong.
- The Reverend Father Bernard McKenna. For social services and services to Education in British Guiana.
- Walter Leonard Maguire, Warden of Nevis and Additional Magistrate, St. Christopher Nevis Anguilla.
- Walter Wesley Merritt, Senior Public Health Inspector, Bridgetown City Council, Barbados.
- Albert Joel Miller, Superintendent of Police, Bahamas.
- John McKee Miller, British Council's Representative in British Honduras.
- Charles Oduk, District Officer, Kenya.
- John Anthony Owen, Mains Engineer, Sarawak Electricity Supply Co. Ltd.
- Joseph Wilde Palmer, Inspecting Engineer, Crown Agents for Oversea Governments and Administrations.
- Kenneth Archibald Pascoe. For public services in Zanzibar.
- Arthur Lionel Bertie Perkins, Senior Assistant Secretary and Secretary to the Road Authority, Kenya.
- Fitzroy Rashleigh Phillip, Accountant-General, Grenada.
- Edward Joseph Reynolds, Senior Executive Officer, Crown Agents for Oversea Governments and Administrations.
- Louis Francois Rivet, Senior Usher, Supreme Court, Mauritius.
- Isabel Maud Avery Rutt, Personal Secretary, Kenya.
- Margaret Noyes Staple. For services to the Girl Guide movement in Hong Kong.
- James Joseph Talbot, MB, BCh, Government MedicalOfficer, British Guiana.
- Tung Man-tak, Assistant Statistical Officer, Hong Kong.
- Sydney Leopold Sylvanus Walling, lately Postmaster, Antigua.
- Cecil Joseph Wheeler, Deputy Registrar of Supreme Court, Gibraltar.
- Geoffrey Owen Whittaker, Principal Auditor, Windward Islands.
- Anthony Lawrence Arthur Wolffsohn, Senior Assistant Conservator of Forests, British Honduras.
- Yao Peng Hua, Clerk of Councils, Sarawak.
- Maurice Theodore Stephen Young, Senior Headteacher, Education Department, St. Helena.
- Franz Raymond Ysaguirre, Draughtsman and Field Officer, Department of Housing and Planning, British Honduras.

Southern Rhodesia

- Gertrude Helen Mabel Cripwell. For social welfare services, especially in connection with Homecraft Clubs.
- Edith Alice Green, in charge of St. Gabriel's Home, Bulawayo.
- Cedric Norman Hayes, a member of the State Lottery Trust.
- Desmond Charles van Jaarsveldt. For services to Sport in Southern Rhodesia.
- Selina Mabel Lesabe. For social welfare services in the Bulawayo African Townships.
- Gordon Roy Smart, a farmer, and the Senior Pilot of the Police Reserve Air Wing.
- Jean Spurling. For social welfare services, especially to the wives of African policemen.

Northern Rhodesia

- Victoria Maud Mary Acheson. For social services in Northern Rhodesia.
- Desmond Ronald Crampton Bailey, MC, Administrative Officer, Northern Rhodesia.
- George Bradshaw Emslie, Tobacco Adviser, Department of Agriculture, Northern Rhodesia.
- The Reverend Charles Stephen Foster. For services as a missionary in Northern Rhodesia.
- The Reverend Arthur Edwin Morse. For services as a missionary in Northern Rhodesia.

Nyasaland

- Donald Hoyle Laycock, Director of Research Station, Tea Association of Nyasaland and Rhodesia.

=== Order of the Companions of Honour (CH) ===
- The Right Honourable Keith Jacka Holyoake, Prime Minister and Minister of External Affairs, New Zealand.

=== British Empire Medal (BEM) ===
Military Division

Royal Navy

- Chief Petty Officer Reginald James Vernon Alexander, P/JX.149006.
- Chief Petty Officer Phillip Harold Allen, DSM, P/JX.139349.
- Chief Engine Room Artificer Alexander Ball, DSM, D/MX.59400.
- Chief Petty Officer (G.I.) George Edward Brown, P/JX.150394.
- Chief Aircraft Artificer (O) Donald Richard Cassell, L/FX.82430.
- Chief Petty Officer Ronald Moses Champion, P/JX.144515.
- Chief Engine Room Artificer Reginald James Croney, DSM, P/MX.845462.
- Chief Petty Officer (T.A.S.I.) Eric Horace Curtis, D/JX.157040.
- Chief Petty Officer Kenneth William George Cutting, P/JX.581603.
- Chief Mechanician Richard Frederick Earp, P/KX.88668.
- Chief Electrician Edwin Ralph George Hooper, D/MX.856424.
- Stores Chief Petty Officer (S) William George Hussey, P/MX.759509.
- Master at Arms Stephen Wallace Jackson, P/MX.715170.
- Chief Petty Officer Mohamed Johari, Royal East African Navy.
- Electrical Artificer 1st Class Anthony Gordon John, P/MX.740234.
- Chief Petty Officer Writer Alexander Kennedy, P/MX.781730 (lately on loan to the Government of the Federation of Malaya).
- Chief Petty Officer Gerald Kusimba, Royal East African Navy.
- Quartermaster Sergeant (T) JohnLe Brun, Po/X.2907, Royal Marines.
- Chief Electrical Artificer John Russell Muirhead, D/MX.93517.
- Chief Ordnance Artificer Edward Augustus Munn, P/MX.51318.
- Chief Wren Steward (O) Phyllis Mary Oxer, 27474, Women's Royal Naval Service.
- Chief Engine Room Artificer Albert Pearson, P/MX.503256.
- Chief Petty Officer Cook (O) Jack Poulton, P/MX.59994.
- Colour Sergeant George Henry Pritchard, Po/X.5237, Royal Marines.
- Chief Wren Radio Electrician (Air) Eleanor Mary Reardon, 45367, Women's Royal Naval Service.
- Chief Aircraft Artificer (A/E) John James Rowe, L/FX.897068.
- Chief Engine Room Artificer Bert John Saunders, P/MX.505976.
- Regimental Sergeant Major Walter Jack Thomas, Po/X.4389, Royal Marines.
- Chief Radio Supervisor (S) John Anthony Thorpe, P/JX.760021.
- Chief Air Fitter (A/E) Reginald Charles William Tozer, L/FX.82659.
- Chief Petty Officer Cook (S) Alfred James Trevaskus, D/MX.54725.
- Regulating Petty Officer Leon Frederick Hanson Vaux, P/MX.802259.
- Chief Aircraft Artificer (A/E) Harry Thomas Willis, L/FX.77288.

Army

- 966872 Sergeant Leslie Harold Banks, Royal Regiment of Artillery.
- 22524763 Sergeant William John Bates, 1st East Anglian Regiment (Royal Norfolk and Suffolk).
- 22528123 Warrant Officer Class I (acting) Robert Bennett, Special Air Service Regiment.
- 19048520 Warrant Officer Class II (acting) Charles Brown, Royal Army Medical Corps.
- X/7961849 Staff-Sergeant Henryk Bujko, The Royal Dragoons (1st Dragoons), Royal Armoured Corps.
- 21184239 Staff-Sergeant Stanley Collingwood, Corps of Royal Electrical and Mechanical Engineers.
- 22345723 Corporal Raymond James Cooper, ArmyCatering Corps, Territorial Army.
- 23404234 Sergeant Roy Croxon, Royal Army Medical Corps.
- 22244886 Sergeant William Cutty, The Durham Light Infantry, Territorial Army.
- 22839554 Staff-Sergeant Eric Curtis Dunkley, Royal Army Ordnance Corps.
- W/365058 Warrant Officer Class II (acting) Dorothy Spencer Gibbs, Women's Royal Army Corps.
- 23465012 Sergeant Charles Douglas Goddard, MM, The Royal Irish Fusiliers (Princess Victoria's), Territorial Army.
- S/14187760 Staff-Sergeant Robert William Gorry, Royal Army Service Corps.
- 19043956 Corporal Stephen Geoffrey Graham, The Royal Ulster Rifles.
- S/22525044 Sergeant Albert Leonard Haythornthwaite, Royal Army Service Corps.
- 7600573 Staff-Sergeant Charles Frederick Somers Hiscox, Corps of Royal Electrical and Mechanical Engineers.
- 23232283 Corporal Wilfred George Hocquard, Corps of Royal Electrical and Mechanical Engineers.
- 22146145 Sergeant Peter John Jones, Royal Army Pay Corps.
- 22289145 Staff-Sergeant Eric Charles Kennett, Corps ofRoyal Electrical and Mechanical Engineers.
- W/387935 Sergeant (acting) Vera Lee, Women's Royal Army Corps.
- 14469366 Staff-Sergeant James Sefton Little, Corps of Royal Engineers.
- 10559638 Staff-Sergeant (acting) Geoffrey Roy Loveday, Corps of Royal Electrical and Mechanical Engineers.
- 22839412 Sergeant Albert McCaffery, Royal Army Medical Corps.
- 22006515 Staff Sergeant Charles Patrick McKernan, Royal Army Ordnance Corps; on loan to the Government of the Federation of Malaya.
- 23235086 Sergeant Thomas Roy Mallabone, Royal Corps of Signals.
- 22221486 Staff-Sergeant (acting) Peter Henry Matthews, Military Provost Staff Corps.
- Ls/4387110 Warrant Officer Class II (local) John Middleton, The Green Howards (Alexandra, Princess of Wales's Own Yorkshire Regiment).
- 21183004 Corporal Samuel O'Neill, Army Catering Corps.
- T/19046914 Sergeant Stanley Rackham, Royal Army Service Corps.
- 221134981 Sergeant (Clerk) Rambahadur Gurung, 7th Duke of Edinburgh's Own Gurkha Rifles.
- T/22S47232 Sergeant Dennis Robey, Royal Army Service Corps.
- T/22309782 Sergeant Kenneth Robinson, Royal Army Service Corps.
- W/271763 Sergeant (acting) Stella Hart Shearman, Women's Royal Army Corps.
- 22552429 Staff-Sergeant Antony Stone, Intelligence Corps.
- 22962185 Staff-Sergeant Derek Laurence Stanley Taylor, Royal Regiment of Artillery.
- 2612357 Sergeant Cyril Tudge, Grenadier Guards.
- 2140455 Staff-Sergeant Christopher James Tyler, Corps of Royal Engineers.
- 21134973 Colour-Sergeant Uttamsing Gurung, 6th Queen Elizabeth's Own Gurkha Rifles.
- T/22963155 Corporal Vivian Howard Vaughan, Royal Army Service Corps.
- 7017922 Warrant Officer Class II (acting) Edward Wood, Army Catering Corps.
- 22201221 Staff-Sergeant Guy Bevan Yearsley, Corps of Royal Engineers.

Royal Air Force

- 615048 Flight Sergeant (now Warrant Officer) William Ball.
- 513707 Flight Sergeant (now Warrant Officer) William Harold Boulton.
- 541018 Flight Sergeant Richard Charles Bruce.
- 2462113 Flight Sergeant Ernest Charles Dunsford.
- 1410461 Flight Sergeant Dennis John Endacott.
- 364345 Flight Sergeant Henry James Fitzhenry.
- 570396 Flight Sergeant Ernest Maurice Gladman.
- 567552 Flight Sergeant Donald James Hand.
- 543899 Flight Sergeant Samuel John Nelson Hayes.
- 1903642 Flight Sergeant Patrick Jasper Anthony Linehan.
- 1478392 Flight Sergeant James Maunder, Royal Air Force Regiment.
- 3502676 Flight Sergeant Michael Anthony Stratford Reed.
- 524175 Flight Sergeant Henry Reeves.
- 550706 Chief Technician Edmund Blake.
- 4011663 Chief Technician Harry Bowers.
- 523233 Chief Technician Frank Derbyshire.
- 574115 Chief Technician John Thomas Ettles.
- 4018908 Chief Technician Patrick Ernest Thurlow.
- 4024522 Acting Flight Sergeant William Robertson Brankin.
- 613356 Sergeant Andrew Nicholas Creswell.
- 1820205 Sergeant John Saunders Currie.
- 618457 Sergeant Edward Charles Douglass.
- 1925261 Sergeant Hugh Bradley Dunlop.
- 4020362 Sergeant Arthur Hale.
- 4008550 Sergeant Hugh Martin Harper.
- 582789 Sergeant Maxwell Leigh.
- 573171 Sergeant Donald Syme Maclachlan.
- 4025980 Sergeant Donald Leslie Murphy.
- 4005816 Sergeant Patrick Joseph O'Neill.
- 4180297 Sergeant Bernard Leslie Pope.
- 578869 Sergeant Ronald Edwin Pound.
- 1923192 Sergeant Charles Edmond Stagg.
- 1336128 Sergeant Kenneth Styles.
- 1900354 Sergeant James Joseph Walsh, Royal Air Force Regiment.
- 4042626 Sergeant Joseph Edward Westwood.
- 587994 Senior Technician Ronald Edward Nicholls.
- 4131744 Corporal William Thomas Bounds.
- 796060 Corporal Technician Joseph Balzan, (Malta).
- 589141 Corporal Technician Thomas Leslie Jones.
- 4253040 Acting Corporal Richard Douglas Lane.

Civil Division
United Kingdom

- Saleh Hadi Ahmed, Foreman, Mechanical Transport Flight, Air Forces, Middle East, Air Ministry.
- John Allen, Tool Setter, Joseph Lucas (Electrical) Ltd. (Birmingham).
- John Aloy, Assistant Manager, W.D. Laundry, Gibraltar, War Office.
- Ronald Andrews, Inspector (New Works), Western Region, British Railways (Glamorgan).
- Herbert Charles Mitchell Anness, Hall Superintendent, British Museum (Natural History) (London S.W.7).
- Arthur Thomas Apperley, Turbine Room Foreman, Hams Hall "B" Power Station, West Midlands Division, Central Electricity Generating Board (Birmingham).
- Wilmot Canning Atchley, Chief Observer, Assistant Duty Controller, No. 12 Group, Royal Observer Corps (Bristol).
- Sidney Joseph Bailey, lately Divisional Foreman, Highways Department, Gloucestershire County Council (Dursley).
- Ellen Elizabeth Bassett, Honorary Collector, Street Savings Group, Wolverhampton.
- Walter Leonard Batt, Watcher, Board of Customs and Excise (Bromley, Kent).
- Hannah Georgina Beadles, Honorary Collector, Wesley Street and Wesley Place Savings Group, Newtown.
- Donald Beaton, Fireman, Western Area Fire Brigade, Scotland (Argyll).
- Francis Joseph Begley, Postman, Head Post Office, Belfast.
- Cyril Willey Bird, Office Keeper, Grade I, Royal Mint (London E.C.3).
- Herbert Bloomfield, Senior Inspector of Custodians, Lord Great Chamberlain's Department, House of Lords (Osterley, Middlesex).
- Harry Briggs, Chief Inspector of Postmen, Midland Region, General Post Office (Malvern).
- Luther Britton, Charge Nurse, Broadmoor Hospital, Ministry of Health.
- Charles William Brown, Technician I, London Telecommunications Region, South West Area, General Post Office (Morden, Surrey).
- Miriam Elizabeth Davenport-Browne, Member, County Staff (Welfare) Kent, Women's Voluntary Service (Tunbridge Wells).
- Walter Nicholas Buckingham, Sub-Postmaster, Hethersett, Norwich, Norfolk.
- John Caughey, Collector, Street Savings Group, Ballynahinch, Co. Down.
- Sarah Caulfield, Collector, Street Savings Group, Lurgan, Co. Armagh.
- Howard James Chandler, Part-time Instructor, Civil Defence Corps, Cumberland (Workington).
- Horace Allan Chatfield, Chief Bedroom Steward, SS Andes, Royal Mail Lines Ltd. (Southampton).
- Ernest Edward Cheadle, Chief Office Keeper, War Office (Crookham, Hampshire).
- Rainald Keith Chester, Foreman, The Mullard-Osram Valve Co. Ltd. (Hounslow, Middlesex).
- Samuel Clark, Mechanical Transport Officer (Grade II), Prestwick Airport, Ministry of Aviation.
- Samuel Jamieson Clark, Manager, Radcliffe Hostel, Remploy Ltd., Radcliffe, Lancashire.
- Ernest F. Clarke, Company Commandant, Edinburgh Princes Street (B.R.) Company, St. Andrew's Ambulance Corps.
- Ronald William Coutts, Chief Inspector, Head Post Office, Meadowside, Dundee.
- Annie W. Cowell, Member, Cambridge Borough Staff, Women's Voluntary Service.
- James Craik, Foreman estate worker, Edinburgh Centre of Rural Economy (Penicuik).
- James Henry Crawford, Chief Inspector, W.D. Constabulary, War Office (Hounslow, Middlesex).
- John William Danson, Chargehand Plater, Vickers-Armstrongs (Engineers), Ltd., Barrow-in-Furness.
- Ronald Vernon Davis, Leading Draughtsman, Ship Department, Admiralty (Bath).
- George Henry Dean, JP, Colliery Deputy, Granville Colliery, West Midlands Division, National Coal Board (Wellington).
- Frederick Foxhall Dent, Process and General Supervisory Class, Grade III, Royal Naval Propellant Factory, Chepstow (Newport).
- John Cyril De Souza, Draughtsman, Grade I, HM Dockyard, Singapore.
- Charles Joseph Devine, Ambulance Driver-Attendant, Northern Ireland Hospitals Authority (Belfast).
- Frederick Arthur Dowding, Part-time Instructor, Civil Defence Corps, Wiltshire (Trowbridge).
- Walter David Dunster, Civilian Supplies Officer, RASC, War Office (Taunton, Somerset).
- Lionel Jack Edmonds, Civilian Warrant Officer, No. 649 (Dursley) Squadron, Air Training Corps (Berkeley, Gloucestershire).
- Edward Edwards, Farm Manager, University College of North Wales, Bangor (Aber, Caernarvonshire).
- Carmel Ellul, Pumpman, HM Naval Base, Malta, GC.
- Joseph Evans, Research and Development Craftsman, Safety in Mines Research Establishment, Ministry of Power (Buxton).
- Victor Andrew Evans, Research and Development Craftsman (Special), Royal Radar Establishment, Ministry of Aviation (Defford, Worcestershire).
- Wilfred Falkous, Officer in Charge, Supply and Transport Store, Aycliffe, Home Office (Darlington).
- James Miller Ferguson, Draughtsman, Higher Grade, Ordnance Survey, Ministry of Agriculture, Fisheries and Food (Southampton).
- Alfred Firth, Overman, Brandon Pit House Colliery, Durham Division, National Coal Board.
- George Thomas Foster, Motorman, MV Kirkham Abbey, Associated Humber Lines Ltd., British Transport Commission (Goole).
- Gwendoline May Fuller, Manageress, Brooklands Official Luncheon Club, Cambridge.
- John Richard Gale, Building Supervisor, Long Grove Psychiatric Hospital, Epsom.
- William Gallagher, Foreman Engineer (Dock), Yarrow & Co. Ltd., Scotstoun (Glasgow).
- George Gallie, MM, Process Supervisor II, Springfields Works, United Kingdom Atomic Energy Authority (Preston).
- William Ogg Gibson, Foreman Store-Keeper, Douglas Fraser & Sons Ltd., Arbroath (Angus).
- Robert Smith Gillan, Excavation Attendant, South of Scotland Electricity Board (Glasgow).
- Henry Samuel Goodey, Technical Class, Grade III, Royal Arsenal, Woolwich, War Office (London N.2).
- George Henry Goodwin, Storeman-Clerk, Territorial and Auxiliary Forces Association, Counties of Huntingdon and Northampton (Northampton).
- John Henry Graham, Chargeman of Motor Transport Drivers, HM Dockyard, Chatham (Gillingham).
- Ralph Harry Gregory, Canteen General Manager, No. 25 Maintenance Unit, RAF Hartlebury (Kidderminster).
- William John Rees Gumbleton, DSM, Foreman Shaftsman, Six Bells Colliery, South Western Division, National Coal Board (Abertillery).
- Charles Edward Hall, Postman, Higher Grade, North Western District Office, General Post Office (London N.12).
- Selina Hammond, Honorary Collector, Charing Parish Savings Group, Ashford, Kent.
- Robert George Hancock, Foreman Fitter, RAF Halton, Air Ministry (Chesham).
- Annie Harrison. For services to the sick and aged in Flintshire (Bronington).
- David William Hayes, Motor Driver, Supplies Department, General Post Office (London N.4).
- James Hayton, Foreman of Stores, No. 14 Maintenance Unit, Carlisle, Air Ministry.
- Erwin Alfred Hering, Officer Keeper II, Home Office (London S.W.2).
- Ivy Elizabeth Hindes, Honorary Collector, Street Savings Group, Dovercourt.
- Doris Ruth Holliday, Member, Headquarters Staff, Services Welfare Department Overseas, Women's Voluntary Service (London S.E.1).
- William Edwin Holliday, General Foreman, John Harris & Sons, Contractors, Stratford-on-Avon.
- John Reginald Wood Hollinshead, Chief Observer, Post 16/Q1, No. 16 Group, Royal Observer Corps (Congleton, Cheshire).
- Charles Morgan Hood, Sub-Postmaster, Lewis Road, Sidcup, Kent.
- Charles Reed Hunter, Foreman Joiner, James A. Jobling & Co. Ltd., Sunderland.
- William John Izzard, Foreman, Standards Room and Gauge Department, C.A.V. Ltd. (Enfield).
- James Jackson, Distribution Foreman, Todmorden District, North Eastern Gas Board (Hebden Bridge).
- Bertram Thomas Jones, Underground Mechanic, Wharncliffe Silkstone Colliery, North Eastern Division, National Coal Board (Barnsley).
- Grace Beatrice Jones, Matron, HM Borstal Institution, Castle Huntly, Angus.
- Rhys Jones, Custodian, Strata Florida Abbey, Ministry of Public Building and Works (Meurig, Cardiganshire).
- Rose Hilda Jones, Enrolled Nurse, Brompton Hospital Sanatorium, Frimley.
- William Charles Jones, Blast Furnace Foreman, Millom Hematite Ore & Iron Co. Ltd. (Millom, Cumberland).
- Mary Eleanor Jowsey, Manageress, NAAFI, Junior Ranks Club, Bordon.
- Elizabeth Kemp, Honorary Collector, Long Crendon Street and Village Savings Group, Buckinghamshire.
- James Henry Kerr, Chief Officer Class I, HM Prison, Leeds.
- Albert Lathey Kersley, Inspector, New Street, Basingstoke, General Post Office.
- James Laverty, Senior Foreman, A.C.D. Bridge Co. Ltd. (Edinburgh).
- George Ernest Lawrie, Hospital Chief Officer, Class I, HM Prison, Wormwood Scrubs.
- Arthur Robert Lee, Station Officer, Yorkshire West Riding Fire Brigade (Penistone).
- Roy Spencer Levett, Technician, Grade II, Headquarters, Near East Air Force, Air Ministry.
- Violet Mabel Lilley, Chief Supervisor, (Telephones), Eastbourne, General Post Office.
- John Little, Deputy, Auchincruive 4/5 Colliery, Scottish Division, National Coal Board (Ayr).
- Emily Elizabeth Littlewood, Deputy County Borough Organiser, Barnsley, Women's Voluntary Service.
- Joseph Philip Loftus, Technical Officer, Telephone Exchange, Grimsby, Lincolnshire.
- Alfred John Ludford, Research and Development Craftsman (Special), Royal Aircraft Establishment, Ministry of Aviation (Aldershot).
- John McBay, Staff Foreman, Telford, Grier, Mackay & Co. Ltd., Glasgow.
- Samuel McCorkell, Chief Inspector, Foyle Fisheries Commission, Co. Londonderry. (Omagh, Co. Tyrone).
- Richard Gibson McKay, Leader, Blythe Street Boys' Club, Belfast.
- Douglas Charles Mackness, Leader, St. Francis Boys' Clubs, Welwyn Garden City.
- Alexander Thomas McKnight, Chief Warden, Greenock Civil Defence Authority.
- Duncan Maclennan, Motor Mail Contractor, General Post Office, Shieldaig, Strathcarron, Ross-shire.
- Stanley Clifford McNally, Assistant Station Radio Officer, Government Communications Headquarters, Foreign Office (Cheltenham).
- Patrick Joseph McNulty, Locomotive Erector, Yorkshire Engine Co. Ltd., Sheffield (Rotherham).
- Robert Malcolmson, Sub-Postmaster, Magheralin, Lurgan, Co. Armagh.
- William Charles Mansfield, Chargehand Driver, Royal Armament Research and Development Establishment, War Office (Bexleyheath, Kent).
- Thomas Frederick Mead, Passenger Guard, Eastern Region, British Railways (London E.10).
- Jeffrey John Meek, Fitter, English Electric Co. Ltd., Stafford (Rugeley).
- John Menary, Sub-District Commandant, Ulster Special Constabulary (Killyleagh, Co. Armagh).
- Frederick Harry Miller, Technical Grade II, Royal Aircraft Establishment, Ministry of Aviation (Aldershot).
- Frank Louis James Milus, Superintendent, Dorset Special Constabulary (Dorchester).
- Percy Moorhouse, CoalfaceWorker, Lepton Edge Colliery, North Eastern Division, National Coal Board (Huddersfield).
- Charles George Noakes, Building Superintendent, Northern Production Region, East Midlands Gas Board (Sheffield).
- Ernest Albert Oakman, Works Technical Officer III, Radio Research Station, Department of Scientific and Industrial Research (Winkfield, Berkshire).
- Barry Anderson Richards O'Hara, Sergeant, Royal Ulster Constabulary (Lisburn, Co. Antrim).
- Annie Dorothy Outhwaite, Sub-Postmistress, Askrigg Sub Post Office, Leyburn, Yorkshire.
- Henry Ivor Owen, Switchboard Attendant, Rheidol Power Station, North Western Region, Central Electricity Generating Board (Aberystwyth).
- Reginald Charles Parrott, Superintendent, Walsall Special Constabulary.
- Percy Harold Perry, Chargehand, The Sperry Gyroscope Company, Bracknell (Ascot).
- Dora Ellen Phipps, Head Laundress, City Council Laundry, Birmingham.
- Nicolina Picken, Canteen Supervisor, Royal Ordnance Factory, Bishopton, War Office (Paisley).
- Charles Walter Frank Pottenger, Instructor, Sea Cadet Corps, Mersey Division (Liverpool).
- Elsie Potts, Head Tracer, Butters Bros. & Co. Ltd., Glasgow (Bishopbriggs).
- James Poxton, Senior Viewer, Tubes Ltd., Birmingham (Walsall).
- George Joseph Prince, Inspector of Shipwrights, HM Dockyard, Portsmouth (Fareham).
- David Gordon Ramage, Foreman Maintenance Engineer, British Oil & Cake Mills Ltd., Greenock.
- Frederick Ramsbottom, Assistant Warehouse Supervisor, HM Stationery Office (Manchester).
- Reginald Thomas Reeves, Chief Observer, Post 10/Z.1, No. 10 Group, Lynton, Royal Observer Corps (Lynton, Devon).
- Emlyn Richards, Technical Assistant to Distribution Engineer, Wales Gas Board (Neath).
- Kenneth Roach, Filler, Cambois Colliery, Northern (N & C) Division, National Coal Board (Blyth, Northumberland).
- William Milton Roaf, Chargehand Meter Reader/Collector, London Electricity Board (London E.12).
- Horace David Robinson, Sub-Officer, Essex Fire Brigade (Stansted).
- Arthur Clifford Rogers, Inspector, Metropolitan Police Force (London S.E.9).
- John Rudd, Station Warden, Royal Air Force, Cardington, Air Ministry (Bedford).
- Marjorie Vera Sanders, Commandant, Newport Detachment, Isle of Wight Branch, British Red Cross Society (Carisbrooke).
- Elsie Savery, Chief Supervisor (Telephones), Telephone Exchange, Cheltenham, General Post Office.
- Roy Colin Sewell, Civilian Warrant Officer, No. 2093 (Manchester City) Squadron, Air Training Corps (Manchester).
- Matthew Slater Singleton, Part-time Fatstock Officer, Ministry of Agriculture, Fisheries and Food (Gosforth, Cumberland).
- William Henry Hussey Skinner, Gasfitting Foreman, Sheffield District, East Midlands Gas Board (Sheffield).
- Margaret Gertrude Smith, Deputy Convoy Organiser, Accrington Team, Food Flying Squad (Nelson).
- Frederick Stalton, Experimental Worker, Grade II, Waltham Abbey, Ministry of Aviation.
- Cecil Harold Frederick Stears, Chief Dental Technician, RN Barracks, Portsmouth (Southsea).
- Percival Herbert Stephens, Attached War Office (Portsmouth).
- Andrew Stevenson, lately Reader and Foreman Compositor, Mackenzie & Storrie, Edinburgh.
- John Swift, Area Foreman, Alt Area, Mersey River Board (Liverpool).
- Barbara Joan Tanner, Youth Club Leader, Pioneer Youth Club, St. Albans.
- David Raymond Thomas, Process and General Supervisory Class, Grade III, Royal Ordnance Factory, Pembrey, War Office (Penygroes, Carmarthenshire).
- Arthur Thorpe, Senior Process Supervisor, Aldermaston, United Kingdom Atomic Energy Authority (Newbury).
- Albert Tiley, Foreman in Charge, Instrument Making Department, George Kent Ltd., Luton.
- Sydney Valentine Trundle, Foreman Grinder, Cooper Roller Bearings Co. Ltd., King's Lynn, Norfolk.
- Herbert Henry Anthony Tyrer, Senior Chief Supervisor, Continental Exchange, General Post Office (London E.6).
- Jack Evelyn Vincent, Regimental Quartermaster-Serjeant, Eton College Combined Cadet Force (Windsor).
- Arthur R. Wait, Leader, Tyler Street Boys' Club, Stratford-upon-Avon.
- Hugh Dow Walker, Carpenter, SS Clan MacDonald, British & Commonwealth Shipping Co. Ltd. (Lenzie, Lanarkshire).
- William Walker, Boatswain, SS Benhiant, Ben Line Steamers (Aberdeen).
- John Ernest Walls, General Superintendent, Peabody Donation Fund, Peabody Estate, London.
- Alfred Watts, Gardener-Caretaker, France, Northern Region, Commonwealth War Graves Commission.
- Joseph Ernest West, Chief Security Officer, Office of the British High Commissioner, Calcutta.
- Norah Beatrice West, Honorary Street Savings Group Worker, Portishead, Somerset.
- Hilland Westerman, Honorary Collector, Middlewood Estate Street Savings Group, Oughtibridge, Sheffield.
- Mary Ellen Wharton, ARRC, Commandant, Morpeth Women's Detachment N/20, Northumberland Branch, British Red Cross Society.
- Ernest Williams, Verger, St. Martin's Garrison Church, Catterick Camp, War Office.
- Ernest Alfred Willoughby, Senior Scientific Assistant, Admiralty Surface Weapons Establishment (Southsea).
- Frederick Sidney Woolley, Coalface Steel Supports Supervisor, Hucknall Colliery, East Midlands Division, National Coal Board (Hucknall, Nottinghamshire).
- Wah Ping Young, Chinese Clerk, Hong Kong, Ministry of Public Building and Works.

Overseas Territories

- Ahmed Rehmatulla, Assistant Postmaster, Aden.
- George Elliott Downes, Highways Superintendent, Department of Highways and Transport, Barbados.
- Iris Leonie Abraham, Rural Craft Instructress, Social Development Department, British Honduras.
- Leung Wai-sang, Clerk, Royal Hong Kong Defence Force, Hong Kong.
- Farah Isaac, MM, Interpreter Grade I, Kenya.
- Modan Hingh Santa Singh, Inspector (Roads), Kenya.
- Madi bin Gadau, Village Headman, Kampong Bayangan, Keningau, North Borneo.
- Ezra Archibald Dalton Long, Senior Laboratory Technician, Saint Lucia.
- Jean Joseph Jacques, Head Mechanic, Port and Marine Department, Seychelles.
- Edward Gooder, Chief Officer, Prison Service, Singapore.
- Jacobus Johannes Christoffel Robberts, Works Foreman, Department of Land Utilization, Swaziland.
- Clifford Stanley Jones, lately Inspector of Schools, Turks and Caicos Islands.
- Umbaya Vuai Shirazi, Chairman, Chwaka Local Council, Zanzibar.

State of New South Wales

- Leslie Allen Wakeling Allen, Senior Messenger, Government House, Sydney.

State of Victoria

- Elizabeth May Alice Cahill, Private Secretary, Department of Education.
- Albert Thomas Curtis, Member, Maryborough Citizens Band.

Federation of Malaya

- Bert Hines, Police Lieutenant, Royal Federation of Malaya Police.

Southern Rhodesia

- Snake Bisantl, Senior Labour Assistant, Department of Labour.
- Machado, Station Sergeant, British South Africa Police.

Northern Rhodesia

- Godfrey Alexander Sisseo, Technical Assistant (Veterinary).

Nyasaland

- Byson Elisa Muktwa, Executive Officer, Grade I, Government Press.

=== Royal Victorian Medal (RVM) ===
In Silver

- Chief Petty Officer Herbert Morley Cain, P/JX.760438.
- Rowland Rossiter Clayton.
- Yeoman Bedgoer James Durkin, Her Majesty's Bodyguard of the Yeomen of the Guard.
- Walter Robin Fry.
- Gilbert Hawkins.
- Charles Oulton.
- Eric Pettman.
- Gladys Pooley.
- Stores Chief Petty Officer (V) Ronald John Prickett, P/MX.71062.
- Harry Rayment.
- Leonard Richards.
- Bertha Sheridan.
- Frederick Albert Todd.
- Wallace Jack Twite.
- Wilfred Sydney Walker.

=== Royal Red Cross (RRC) ===
- Nancy Helen Glew, ARRC, Principal Matron, Queen Alexandra's Royal Naval Nursing Service.
- Lieutenant-Colonel (temporary) Helen Cattanach (348096), Queen Alexandra's Royal Army Nursing Corps.
- Squadron Officer Florence Eva Perry, ARRC, (405333), Princess Mary's Royal Air Force Nursing Service.

==== Associate of the Royal Red Cross (ARRC) ====
- Alfreda Ella Etheridge, Head Naval Nursing Auxiliary.
- Major Joan Frances Herbert (329859), Queen Alexandra's Royal Army Nursing Corps.
- Major Annie O'Neill (325875), Queen Alexandra's Royal Army Nursing Corps.
- Major Joyce Parsons (309380), Queen Alexandra's Royal Army Nursing Corps.
- Flight Officer Jean Booth Brown (407363), (Princess Mary's Royal Air Force Nursing Service.

=== Air Force Cross (AFC) ===
Royal Navy

- Lieutenant-Commander Ronald Leonard, MBE, DFC.

Royal Air Force

- Wing Commander Guy Joseph Charles Hogan, DFC, (40912).
- Wing Commander Rex David Roe (168233).
- Squadron Leader Garry Hilton Burleigh (607259).
- Squadron Leader Donald Percy Hall (607230).
- Squadron Leader Denis John Mountford (776521).
- Squadron Leader Ernest John Strangeway (58041).
- Flight Lieutenant Anthony John Bendell (3517266).
- Flight Lieutenant Kenneth William Hayr (607636).
- Flight Lieutenant John Patrick Hugh O'Neill (2443722).
- Flight Lieutenant Vernon Roland Thompson (584631).
- Flight Lieutenant William Stanley Welsh (54301).
- Flight Lieutenant John Stuart Winterbourne (1629778).

=== Queen's Commendation for Valuable Service in the Air ===
United Kingdom

- Anne Burns, Principal Scientific Officer, Royal Aircraft Establishment, Ministry of Aviation.
- Captain Geoffrey Douglas Ingleton, Senior Base Training Captain, Vanguard Aircraft, British European Airways Corporation.
- Charles David Keir, DSO, DFC, Fleet Commander, Ministry of Aviation Flying Unit.
- Wing Commander Richard Frewen Martin, DFC, AFC, Royal Air Force (Retired), Test Pilot, A. V. Roe & Co. Ltd.
- Gordon Sears, Check Engineer Officer (Flight Operations), British Overseas Airways Corporation.
- Douglas Henry Webber, Experimental Officer, Royal Radar Establishment, Ministry of Aviation.

Royal Navy

- Lieutenant Anthony John Walsh.

Royal Air Force

- Group Captain John Campbell, AFC.
- Wing Commander Laurence George Aggitt Bastard, AFC, (142581).
- Wing Commander John Eadon Bazalgette, DFC, (131145).
- Wing Commander Raymond John Davenport, AFC, (199966).
- Wing Commander Peter Gerald Hill (65560).
- Wing Commander Frederick William Sledmere, AFC, (162087).
- Acting Wing Commander James Cartwright, MBE, (152632).
- Squadron Leader Stanley Walter Bainbridge (3053711).
- Squadron Leader John Reginald Dowling, MBE, DFC, AFC, (150185).
- Squadron Leader Robert Edward Jefferies, AFC, (1581445).
- Squadron Leader Donald McClen (4065528).
- Squadron Leader George Keith Mossman (607021).
- Squadron Leader John Harry Phillips (58026).
- Flight Lieutenant Andrew McFarlane Adams (57007).
- Flight Lieutenant David Conway Grant Brook (607616).
- Flight Lieutenant James Fleming Bulloch (501121).
- Flight Lieutenant Colin Michael Christie (584645).
- Flight Lieutenant John Arthur Cooper (56122).
- Flight Lieutenant Henry Nicholas John, DFM, (177590).
- Flight Lieutenant Robert William Kimmings (1269552).
- Flight Lieutenant Alexander McMillan (2506878).
- Flight Lieutenant James Stephen Noonan (200746).
- Flight Lieutenant David Antony Proctor (3508667).
- Flight Lieutenant Fergus Robertson (1880792).
- Flight Lieutenant Eric John Elrick Smith (607610).
- Flight Lieutenant George Beadle Stratford, DFC, (636773).
- Flight Lieutenant Ladislav Svetlik (117371).
- Flight Lieutenant Albert Edward Whatley (1601896).
- Flying Officer John Robert Huntington, DFM, (1685829).
- Master Pilot Carl Stubbs (1489919).
- Master Pilot Stanley Edward Tomlin (1388750).
- Master Signaller Peter Robert Waller (1396106).

=== Queen's Police Medal (QPM) ===
England and Wales

- Henry Richard Pratt, Chief Constable, Bedfordshire Constabulary.
- Clement George Burrows, MBE, Chief Constable, Oxford City Police.
- Reginald Ernest Geoffrey Benbow, Chief Constable, Mid-Wales Constabulary.
- Frederick Drayton Porter, Assistant Chief Constable, Nottingham City Police.
- William Hood, Assistant Chief Constable, Manchester City Police.
- Albert George Shipley Harris, Chief Superintendent, Bristol City Police.
- Ernest Jack Barkway, Chief Superintendent, Essex Constabulary.
- Charles Percy Attwood, Chief Superintendent, Metropolitan Police.
- James Wilbert Hullah, Superintendent and Deputy Chief Constable, Dudley Borough Police.
- Leonard Robert Allen, Superintendent and Deputy Chief Constable, Reading Borough Police.
- James Myrddyn Davies, Superintendent, Metropolitan Police.
- Richard Granger Patten, Superintendent, Metropolitan Police.

Scotland

- Robert Gow Donaldson, Superintendent, Renfrew and Bute Constabulary.
- John William Brown, Superintendent, Scottish North-Eastern Counties Constabulary.

Northern Ireland

- Francis Todd, Head Constable, Royal Ulster Constabulary.

State of Victoria

- Robert Reginald Thomson, Superintendent Grade I, Victoria Police Force.
- Hugh Rupert Donelly, Superintendent Grade II, Victoria Police Force.
- Clifford Leopold La Fontaine, Inspector Grade I, Victoria Police Force.
- William Marcus Dickson Arnot, Brevet Inspector Grade I, Victoria Police Force.

State of South Australia

- Frank Hector Richardson, Superintendent, South Australia Police Force.
- Roy Alfred Wilson, Inspector 1st Class, South Australia Police Force.

Southern Rhodesia

- John Nicholas Botha, Assistant Commissioner, British South Africa Police.

Overseas Territories

- Wilfred Arthur Farmer, Deputy Commissioner of Police, Barbados.
- Lieutenant-Colonel Paul Hengrave Kitson, OBE, Commissioner of Police, Basutoland Mounted Police.
- John Matthew Sullivan, Deputy Commissioner of Police, Zanzibar.

=== Queen's Fire Services Medal (QFSM) ===
England and Wales

- James Henry Raby, Divisional Officer, Cheshire Fire Brigade.
- Robert Begg, lately Assistant Chief Officer (Deputy Chief Officer), Liverpool Fire Brigade.
- William Roy Howells, MBE, Chief Officer, Herefordshire Fire Brigade.
- Frederick George Cyril Chandler, Divisional Officer, Buckinghamshire Fire Brigade.
- Bert Ernest Royce Cutting, Chief Officer, West Ham Fire Brigade.

State of Victoria

- William Thomas Aldridge, Chief Officer, Metropolitan Fire Brigade, Melbourne.

=== Colonial Police Medal (CPM) ===
- Maxime Ahyave, Assistant Superintendent, Seychelles Police Force.
- Alfred Ambrose Baggott, Superintendent, Hong Kong Police Force.
- David Anthony Blackman, Station Officer, Auxiliary Unit, British Guiana Fire Brigade.
- Edward Launcelot Coombs, Inspector, St. Lucia Police Force.
- George Richard Crawley, Superintendent, Kenya Police Force.
- Bertram St. Alfoan Denbrook, Detective Inspector, Bermuda Police Force.
- Aubrey Bernard Patrick John Derham, Superintendent, Zanzibar Police Force.
- Louis William Evans, Senior Superintendent, Kenya Police Force.
- Leslie Frederick Charles Guyatt, Chief Inspector, Hong Kong Police Force.
- Charles Frederick Harbert, Superintendent, Hong Kong Police Force.
- Eric Marshall Hardy, Superintendent, Kenya Police Force.
- Dennis Holmes, Chief Inspector, Kenya Police Force.
- Bert Hope, Assistant Superintendent, Hong Kong Auxiliary Police Force.
- Essa Omady Joof, Assistant Superintendent, Gambia Police Force.
- Jason Njatha Kimundu, Sub-Inspector, Kenya Police Force.
- Koo Chong Kong, Assistant Superintendent, Sarawak Police Force.
- Lam Kam-chuen, Staff Sergeant Class II, Hong Kong Police Force.
- Clement Leepa, Inspector, Basutoland Mounted Police.
- David Henshaw Lemon, Superintendent, Fiji Police Force.
- Joseph Nixon, Chief Inspector, Bermuda Police Force.
- Mwasya Ndai, Sub-Inspector, Kenya Police Force.
- John Okello, Inspector, Kenya Police Force.
- Alexander Charles Pearson, Assistant Superintendent, Kenya Police Force.
- Andre Pierre, Sub-Inspector, Seychelles Police Force.
- Charles Leonard Stevens, Superintendent, Hong Kong Police Force.
- Naaro Takabea, Constable, Gilbert and Ellice Islands Colony Constabulary.
- William Edward Thomas, Chief Inspector, Hong Kong Police Force.
- Joseph Josiah Vanderpool, Inspector, Antigua, Montserrat and British Virgin Islands Police Force.
- Nguku Waita, Sergeant, Kenya Police Force.
- Geoffrey Allison White, Assistant Superintendent, Kenya Police Force.
- Leslie Arnold Evan Wong, Station Officer, Auxiliary Unit, British Guiana Fire Brigade.

Southern Rhodesia

- Domimico Muchkange Chizema, Sergeant, British South Africa Police.
- William Eustace Foxcroft, Superintendent, British South Africa Police.
- Leonard James Jouning, Superintendent, British South Africa Police.
- Kaboko, Station Sergeant, British South Africa Police.
- Johane Chikupo Muchengetwa, Station Sergeant, British South Africa Police.
- Amos Mutuwo, Station Sergeant, British South Africa Police.
- Edward James Sheriff, Superintendent, British South Africa Police.
- Harold James Vickery, Detective Chief Inspector, British South Africa Police.

Northern Rhodesia

- Jackson Arnold Chipasula, Detective Sub-Inspector, Northern Rhodesia Police Force.
- Augustine Timmy Ndhlew, Detective Assistant Inspector, Grade I, Northern Rhodesia Police Force.

== Australia ==
=== Knight Bachelor ===
- Clive Hamilton Fitts, MD, FRCP, of Hawthorn, Victoria. For services to Medicine.
- Roland Ellis Jacobs, of Unley Park, South Australia. For public services.
- David Roy McCaughey, CMG, of Narrandera, New South Wales. For services to primary industry.
- Laurence Rupert McIntyre, CBE, Her Majesty's Australian Ambassador Extraordinary and Plenipotentiary in Tokyo.
- Maurice Alan Edgar Mawby, CBE, of Canterbury, Victoria. For services to mining and industry.
- Archibald Grenfell Price, CMG, of Gilberton, South Australia. For services to literature and education.

=== Order of the Bath ===
==== Companion of the Order of the Bath (CB) ====
Military Division

- Air Vice-Marshal Charles Douglas Candy, CBE, Royal Australian Air Force.

=== Order of Saint Michael and Saint George ===
==== Knight Commander of the Order of St Michael and St George (KCMG) ====
- Senator the Honourable William Henry Spooner, MM, Vice-President of the Executive Council, and Leader of the Government in the Senate, Commonwealth of Australia.

==== Companion of the Order of St Michael and St George (CMG) ====
- Kenneth Thomas Adamson, President of the Australian Dental Association.
- William Geoffrey Gerard, of Medindie, South Australia. For services to secondary industry.

=== Order of the British Empire ===
==== Commander of the Order of the British Empire (CBE) ====
Military Division

- Major-General (temporary) Thomas Sydney Taylor, MVO, MC, (337500), Australian Staff Corps.
- Brigadier Donald Ross Kerr, ED, (110535), Royal Australian Artillery.
- Group Captain Dixie Robison Chapman, Royal Australian Air Force.

Civil Division

- Stanley Edward Chatterton, of Point Piper, New South Wales. For senvices to social welfare.
- Brigadier Frederick Oliver Chilton, DSO, OBE, Chairman of the Repatriation Commission.
- Arnold Hughes Ennor, Professor of Biochemistry, Australian National University.
- David Osborne Hay, DSO, MBE, Australian High Commissioner in Canada.
- Ronald Bannatyne Lewis, OBE, Director-General, Commonwealth Department of Works.
- Lieutenant-Colonel William Scott Lonnie, OBE, MVO, MC, of Daglish, Western Australia. For services to ex-servicemen.
- Archibald Bertram McFarlane, DFC, Secretary, Department of Air.
- Edmund Morris Miller, Professor Emeritus, University of Tasmania. For services to tertiary education in Australia.

==== Officer of the Order of the British Empire (OBE) ====
Military Division

Royal Australian Navy

- Captain Alfred Maurice Clift.

Australian Military Forces

- Lieutenant-Colonel Gordon Glasgow (154516), Royal Australian Armoured Corps.
- Colonel (temporary) Stuart Clarence Graham, MC, (253), Australian Staff Corps.
- Colonel Ernest George McNamara, ED, (337508), Australian Staff Corps.

Royal Australian Air Force

- Squadron Leader Laurence Henry Hicks (035740).
- Squadron Leader Spiro Peter Tsicalas (012770).

Civil Division

- Frank Maitland Cush, Member of the Australian Board of Control for International Cricket
- Henry Alphonsus de Dassel, Australian representative on the Commonwealth Telecommunications Board, London.
- Ian Fairley Graham Downs, Member of the Legislative Council of the Territory of Papua and New Guinea.
- Mellicent Jean Ellis, Federal President and Honorary Organiser of the Penguin Club of Australia.
- Ethel Frances Hanrahan, Senior Matron, Heidelberg Repatriation General Hospital.
- Ronald Arthur Irish, of Double Bay, New South Wales. For services to commerce and industry.
- The Reverend George Henry Morling, of Pennant Hills, New South Wales. For services to theological education in Australia.
- Gladys Edith Pendred, Federal Officer, Australian Pre-School Association.
- Alexander Frederick Reid, MBE, of Wodonga, Victoria. For services to ex-servicemen and women.
- Lieutenant-Colonel Thomas Angelo Rodriguez, MBE, MC, Comptroller to the Governor-General.
- David Thomas Rogers, JP, of New Town, Tasmania. For services rendered in connection with Australian patriotic organisations.
- Walter Henry Steel, MB, BS, formerly Medical Superintendent, Repatriation General Hospital, Greenslopes, Queensland.
- Andrew Thomson, of Hobart, Tasmania. For services to Shipping.
- Harry Stanley Warren, formerly Collector of Customs, Victoria.
- William Maldon Woodfull, of East Malvern, Victoria. For services to education.
- Frank Arthur Yeates, of Nedlands, Western Australia. For public services.

==== Member of the Order of the British Empire (MBE) ====
Military Division

Royal Australian Navy

- Chief Inspector William Douglas Mossop, Royal Australian Naval Dockyard Police Force.

Australian Military Forces

- Major Thomas Joseph Crawford (270938), Royal Australian Infantry Corps.
- 31440 Warrant Officer Class 2 Edward William Gason, Royal Australian Armoured Corps.
- Lieutenant (Quartermaster) (Honorary Captain) Keith William Kennedy (2735), Royal Australian Infantry Corps.
- 32094 Warrant Officer Class 1 (temporary) Michael Knight, Royal Australian Infantry Corps.
- 5444 Warrant Officer Class 1 David Frederick Nock, Royal Australian Army Provost Corps.
- Major (temporary) Bruce Alan Ridland (426756), Royal Australian Infantry Corps.
- Captain Alan John Russell (1231), Royal Australian Army Ordnance Corps.

Royal Australian Air Force

- Squadron Leader John Malcolm Duncan (04980), Citizen Air Force.
- Flying Officer Frank Ernest Bolton (031947).
- Warrant Officer Pat Edward Curtis (A.2887).
- Warrant Officer Howard Ian Shaw (A.3788).

Civil Division

- Francis Edwin Armstrong, MC, of Telopea, New South Wales. For services to ex-servicemen.
- Leslie William Hamilton de Rune Barclay, Chief Aeronautical Inspector, Sydney Area, Department of Air.
- Matron April Summers Challen, of the Illoura Baptist Homes for the Aged, Norwood, South Australia.
- John Cleary, Australian Assistant Trade Commissioner, Bombay.
- John Rollo Foldi, District Commissioner, New Britain District, Papua.
- Dora Phoebe Gurr, of Geelong, Victoria. For charitable services.
- Frederick Augustus Hickman, of Julia Creek, Queensland. For services to primary industry.
- Harold Edward Hurst. For services to the Scout Movement as Commissioner for Geelong and Nauru.
- Phyllis Knox Jones, Personal Private Secretary to Her Majesty's Australian Ambassador in Washington.
- William John Kenny, formerly Head of the Naval Personnel Branch, Department of the Navy.
- Horst Guenter Kohlsdorf, of Cooma Noith, New South Wales. For services rendered in connection with the Snowy Mountains Hydro-Electric Scheme.
- Dorothea Margaret Lyons, of Darwin, Northern Territory. For social welfare services.
- Harold William McDonald, formerly Secretary and Accountant, Williamstown Naval Dockyard.
- Lila Irene Morgan, of Lidcombe, New South Wales. For services to patriotic and social welfare organisations.
- Captain Henry Vernon Moss, formerly Pilot and Engineer, Trans Australia Airlines, Alice Springs. For services to the Aerial Medical Service in the Northern Territory.
- Ingomar Netliv, Senior Compiler, Demography, Bureau of Census and Statistics.
- Russel Pardoe, MB, BS, Medical Officer with the Australian National Antarctic Research Expedition.
- Harold William Parle, MC, of Mosman, New South Wales. For public services.
- Julius Clive Pollack, President of the Australian Amateur Fencing Federation.
- Philip John Self, of Turramurra, New South Wales. For public services.
- Frederick William Stevens, Superintendent of Communications, Department of Civil Aviation.
- Sister Mildred Alexandra Symons, of Eastwood, New South Wales. For social welfare services rendered under the auspices of the Home Mission Society of the Church of England.
- Dorothy Alice Varcoe, of Armatree, New South Wales. For services to the Australian Red Cross Society and other social welfare organisations.

=== British Empire Medal (BEM) ===
Military Division

Royal Australian Navy

- Chief Engine Room Artificer Leonard George Bebb, R.23304.
- Chief Engineering Mechanic Joseph Thomas Ellis, R.25274.
- Acting Petty Officer Douglas Moore, R.51931.

Australian Military Forces

- 121156 Sergeant Athol Raymond Blackwood, Royal Australian Infantry Corps.
- 26479 Sergeant Raymond Ernest Dummett, Royal Australian Infantry Corps.
- 52676 Corporal Richard Arthur Duprans, Royal Australian Army Service Corps.
- 35941 Sergeant (temporary) John Donald Albert Harrison, Royal Australian Survey Corps.
- 23589 Warrant Officer Class 2 (temporary) Norman George Newcombe, Royal Australian Engineers.
- 1360 Staff-Sergeant Thomas Savage, Royal Australian Infantry Corps.

Royal Australian Air Force

- A633 Flight Sergeant Harry Joseph Darling.
- A5401 Flight Sergeant Desmond Keith Fergusson.
- A260 Flight Sergeant Ronald Elwin Waye.

Civil Division

- Frank Hector Flint, Foreman, Grade A, Naval Storehouse, Garden Island.
- Kabua Cairo, Interpreter, Supreme Court of Papua and New Guinea, Port Moresby.
- Jesses Herbert Gregory, Assistant to the Chief Justice of the High Court of Australia.
- John Henry Hardwicke, lately Electrician, Naval Dockyard, Garden Island.
- Niven Leslie Jones, Engine Overhauls Superintendent, Ansett-A.N.A. Pty. Limited.
- Jane Graham McCook, Secretarial Assistant, Federal Parliament, Brisbane.
- Richard Wellesby Storrier, Senior Technical Officer, Department of the Navy.
- Elsie Margaret Vogt, Personal Assistant and Stenographer to the Secretary, Department of Defence.

=== Royal Red Cross (RRC) ===
- Lieutenant-Colonel (Honorary Colonel) Edna Nell Doig, ARRC, (F.3130), Royal Australian Army Nursing Corps.

=== Air Force Cross (AFC) ===
Royal Australian Air Force

- Wing Commander Frederick John Inger (03124).
- Wing Commander Cornelius Desmond Murphy, DFC, (033188).
- Flight Lieutenant Gordon Herbert Stewart, DFC, (031548).
- Flight Lieutenant Hartley Ronald Winchcombe, DFC, (051504).

=== Queen's Commendation for Valuable Service in the Air ===
Royal Australian Air Force

- Squadron Leader William Thomas Spinks (023624).

== Nigeria ==
=== Knight Bachelor ===
Western Nigeria

- Oba Isaac Babalola Akinyele, OBE, The Olubadan of Ibadan.

=== Order of Saint Michael and Saint George ===
==== Knight Commander of the Order of St Michael and St George (KCMG) ====
Eastern Region

- Andrew Urquhart, CMG, MBE, Deputy Governor.

==== Companion of the Order of St Michael and St George (CMG) ====
Federation of Nigeria

- Eldon Charles Alderton, London Representative of the University of Nigeria, Nsukka.

Northern Region

- Richard Egerton Greswell, MBE, Permanent Secretary, Ministry of Trade and Industry.

=== Order of the British Empire ===
==== Knight Commander of the Order of the British Empire (KBE) ====
Civil Division
Federation of Nigeria

- St. Michael Mobolaji Bank-Anthony, OBE. For public and philanthropic services.

==== Commander of the Order of the British Empire (CBE) ====
Civil Division
Federation of Nigeria

- Nolan Knighton Millett, CVO, Commissioner of Police, 1955-1962.

Northern Nigeria

- Maurice Arthur Collings, MBE, formerly Director of Audit.
- Alhaji Haruna, Emir of Hadejia.

Eastern Nigeria

- Albert Ikeme Osakwe, Permanent Secretary, Eastern Nigeria Public Service.

Western Nigeria

- Darnley Arthur Raymond Alexander, Solicitor-General.

==== Officer of the Order of the British Empire (OBE) ====
Civil Division
Federation of Nigeria

- The Reverend Edward John Jones, MBE, formerly Chairman of the Methodist Mission.
- Nelson Adeyemi Kuforiji, Assistant General Manager (Staff), Nigerian Railway Corporation.

Northern Nigeria

- Alhaji Abdullahi, Dan Buram Jada, Permanent Commissioner of the Public Service Commission.
- Alhaji Aliu, Magajin Gari of Sokoto.
- Patrick Arthur Grier, Deputy Secretary to the Premier.
- Reginald Outram Mant, formerly Permanent Secretary, Ministry of Social Welfare and Co-operatives.
- Mallam Muhammadu Mera, Emir of Argungu.

Eastern Nigeria

- The Reverend Robert Malcolm Macdonald, Administrative Superintendent, Presbyterian Church of Nigeria Leper Colony, Itu, Enyong Division.
- Kenneth Stanley Seal, LRCP, LRCS, Rural Health Adviser.

Western Nigeria

- Erejuwa II, The Olu of Warri.
- William Gascoyne, Surveyor General.
- Joseph Joaquim Ibikunle Marinho, MBE, Public Service Commissioner.
- Henry Michael Babatunde Somade, Chief Inspector of Education.

==== Member of the Order of the British Empire (MBE) ====
Military Division

- Lieutenant-Colonel (local) (now Major) Keith Reid Walker, DSO, (355182), The Queen's Own Highlanders (Seaforth and Camerons); on loan to the Government of the Federation of Nigeria.

Civil Division
Federation of Nigeria

- Major Denis Henry Lionel Parker, MC. For public services.
- Ephraim Olatunde Ogundipe Phillips, Senior Collector of Customs and Excise.
- Telisila Olushola Roberts, Staff Nurse (Mental).
- Martin James Walshe, Acting Chief Executive Officer and General Manager, Electricity Corporation of Nigeria.

Northern Nigeria

- Mallam Abubakar Mashegu, Acting Resident of Benue Province.
- Alhaji Damale Kaita, Councillor for Natural Resources, Katsina Native Authority.
- Anthony Hamilton Millard Kirk-Greene, Senior Lecturer, Institute of Administration, Zaria.
- Alhaji Mohammed Hayattudin, Administrative Officer Class IV.
- Mallam Ibrahim, Chief of Kanam.
- Mai Kyari, Galadima of Bornu.
- Nyelong, Long Kemai, Chief of Shendam.
- Joyce Dinnick-Parr, Chief Woman Education Officer, Ministry of Education.
- Derek Anthony Teague Thain, Administrative Officer Class II.

Eastern Nigeria

- Hugh de Beauvoir Brock, General Manager, Agricultural and Plantations Division, Eastern Nigeria Development Corporation.
- Frances Cameron, Vice-Principal, Union Secondary School for Girls, Ibiaku, Enyong Division.
- Julius Azubike Chukwukelu, Agricultural Superintendent, Ministry of Agriculture.
- Douglas O'Connel Faithful-Davies, Temporary Pharmacist, Ministry of Health.
- Bernard Joseph McDonald, Chief Inspector of Works, Ministry of Works.
- Chief Daniel Okangba Njoku. For services to local government.
- Lawrence Obasi Okoro, First Clerk Assistant to the Eastern Nigeria Legislature.

Western Nigeria

- Isaiah Ayodele Akioye, Principal Inspector of Education (Primary).
- Joseph Ora Izuora, of Sapele. For services to youth organisations and community development.
- Oba John Adetoyese Laoye I, The Timi of Ede.
- Chief Samuel Ojo, The Bada of Shaki in Oyo Division.
- James Oladele Sobande, Administrative Officer Class III.
- Sunday Olayinka Somefun, Government Printer, Ministry of Home Affairs.

=== British Empire Medal (BEM) ===
Military Division

- Company Sergeant-Major Riga Samuel Addingi, Royal Nigerian Army.
- Sergeant Okunola Awoleye, Royal Nigerian Army.

Civil Division for Meritorious Service
Federation of Nigeria

- Wilson Ibekwe, Serjeant Major, Nigerian Police Force.

Northern Region

- Charles Edward Bruce, Motor Licensing Authority Sardauna Province.

Civil Division for Gallantry

- Lawan Grema, Village Head, Northern Nigeria. For courage when faced with a gang of armed cattle thieves.

=== Queen's Police Medal (QPM) ===
- Melville Roberts, Commissioner of Police, Nigeria.
- Edwin Everett, Assistant Commissioner of Police, Nigeria.

=== Queen's Fire Services Medal (QFSM) ===
- Harold Rose, Acting Federal Inspector, Nigeria Fire Service.

== Sierra Leone ==
=== Order of Saint Michael and Saint George ===
==== Knight Commander of the Order of St Michael and St George (KCMG) ====
- Alfred Foley Francis Polden Newns, CMG, CVO, Adviser to the Government.

=== Order of the British Empire ===
==== Commander of the Order of the British Empire (CBE) ====
Civil Division

- The Reverend Canon Harry Alphonso Ebun Sawyerr, MBE, Professor of Theology, Fourah Bay College, The University College of Sierra Leone.

==== Officer of the Order of the British Empire (OBE) ====
Military Division

- Lieutenant-Colonel Michael Francis Cannell, MB, (405636), Royal Army Medical Corps; on loan to the Government of Sierra Leone.

Civil Division

- Muhammad Mahdi, Permanent Secretary, Administrative Service, Government of Sierra Leone.

==== Member of the Order of the British Empire (MBE) ====
Civil Division

- Paramount Chief Musa Fawundu, Mano Sakrim Chiefdom, Pujehun District.
- Paramount Chief Alikali Modu III, Maforki Chiefdom, Port Loko District.
- Dousi Wurie, Director, Sierra Leone Development Company Ltd., Member, Port Loko District Council.

=== British Empire Medal (BEM) ===
Civil Division

- Mohamed Allien Sankoh, Welfare Officer, Sierra Leone Development Company Ltd.
- William Christopher Sutton, Head Teacher, Freetown.

== Jamaica ==
=== Knight Bachelor ===
- Neville Noel Ashenheim, CBE, Her Majesty's Jamaica Ambassador Extraordinary and Plenipotentiary to the United States of America.

=== Order of Saint Michael and Saint George ===
==== Companion of the Order of St Michael and St George (CMG) ====
- Noel Alfred Crosswell, MBE, Commissioner of Police.

=== Order of the British Empire ===
==== Officer of the Order of the British Empire (OBE) ====
Military Division

- Lieutenant-Colonel David Smith, ED, Jamaica Defence Force.

Civil Division

- Frederick McDonald Jones. For voluntary public services.
- Aubrey Lindsay McFarlane, MB, FRCS (Ed.), a prominent surgeon, of Kingston.

==== Member of the Order of the British Empire (MBE) ====
Civil Division

- Said Nadir Shoucair. For philanthropic services to youth movements.
- Enid Wynter. For services to the Girl Guide Movement in Jamaica.

=== British Empire Medal (BEM) ===
Military Division

- W1/2033 Colour-Sergeant Solomon Joel Rodney, 1st Battalion, The Jamaica Regiment.

Civil Division

- Herbert Smith, Livestock Headman, Ministry of Agriculture and Lands.

=== Queen's Police Medal (QPM) ===
- Edward Percy Dorrien Greaves, Assistant Commissioner of Police, Jamaica.

== Trinidad ==
=== Knight Bachelor ===
- Ellis Emmanuel Innocent Clarke, CMG, Her Majesty's Trinidad Ambassador Extraordinary and Plenipotentiary to the United States of America.
- Kenneth Lindsay Grant, OBE. For services to business, social welfare and West Indian cricket.
- Hugh Olliviere Beresford Wooding, CBE, Chief Justice of Trinidad and Tobago.

=== Order of Saint Michael and Saint George ===
==== Companion of the Order of St Michael and St George (CMG) ====
- Louis Alan Reece, Secretary to the Cabinet and Permanent Secretary to the Prime Minister.

=== Order of the British Empire ===
==== Officer of the Order of the British Empire (OBE) ====
Civil Division

- Thomas Charles Cambridge, Permanent Secretary, Ministry of Public Utilities. For services in connection with Independence.
- Vivian Mercer Metivier, FRCS(Ed.), LRCP, of Port-of-Spain. For services to medicine.
- Marguerite Wyke, Chairman, Independence Celebrations Committee.

==== Member of the Order of the British Empire (MBE) ====
Civil Division

- Patrick Stanislaus Castagne, Public Relations Officer, Office of the High Commissioner for Trinidad in London. For services in connection with Independence.
- Mother Helen De Verteuil, St. Joseph's Convent, St. Joseph. For services to music (choral).
- Lystra Lewis, Secretary, Trinidad and Tobago Netball Association.
- Alan Ramoutar, Secretary, Amateur Athletic Association of Trinidad and Tobago. For services to cricket.

== Uganda ==
=== Knight Bachelor ===
- George Barrington Cartland, CMG, formerly Deputy Governor of Uganda.

=== Order of Saint Michael and Saint George ===
==== Companion of the Order of St Michael and St George (CMG) ====
- Charles Peter Selwyn Allen, MVO, OBE, Permanent Secretary to the Prime Minister and Secretary to the Cabinet.

=== Order of the British Empire ===
==== Commander of the Order of the British Empire (CBE) ====
Civil Division

- Wilfrid David Drysdale Fenton, Chairman, Uganda Electricity Board.
- Barbara Saben, MBE, Mayor of Kampala.

==== Officer of the Order of the British Empire (OBE) ====
Civil Division

- Martin Poynting Byers, Labour Commissioner.
- The Reverend Francis Gustav Coates, Headmaster, Busoga College, Mwiri.
- Jeremy Charles Dalton Lawrance, formerly Provincial Commissioner.
- Yona Odida, MBE, Chairman, Acholi Appointments Board.

==== Member of the Order of the British Empire (MBE) ====
Civil Division

- Dolatrai Jinabhai Desai. For social welfare services.
- Alfred Birongo Mutashwera, Chief Judge, Ankole Native Court.
- Yafesi Otim, Chairman, Bukedi District Administration Appointments Board.
- Keith Pegden Smith, Architect, Public Works Department.
- Reginald Frederick Wells, formerly Senior Superintendent of Works (Mechanical), Public Works Department.

=== Queen's Police Medal (QPM) ===
- Stephen Montague Locke, Senior Assistant Commissioner of Police, Uganda.

== Federation of Rhodesia and Nyasaland ==
=== Order of Saint Michael and Saint George ===
==== Companion of the Order of St Michael and St George (CMG) ====
- Benjamin Charles Jack Richards, Governor of the Bank of Rhodesia and Nyasaland.

=== Order of the British Empire ===
==== Knight Commander of the Order of the British Empire (KBE) ====
Civil Division

- Athol Donald Evans, CBE, Secretary for Home Affairs.

==== Commander of the Order of the British Empire (CBE) ====
Civil Division

- Frank Stephen Owen, Federal Minister of Transport.
- Elia Isaakovitch Salzman. For services to the tobacco industry of the Federation.

==== Officer of the Order of the British Empire (OBE) ====
Civil Division

- Albany John Henry Lancaster Bickle, Farmer, Bulawayo district. For public services.
- Herman Aaron Krikler. For services to commerce in the Federation.
- Francis Jack McEwen, Director of the Rhodes National Gallery, Salisbury.
- Herbert Ross, Farmer, Broken Hill. For public services.

==== Member of the Order of the British Empire (MBE) ====
Military Division

- Major Edgar Davey Childes, Rhodesia and Nyasaland Army Service Corps.

Civil Division

- Charles Dodd. For services to Sport in the Federation.
- Douglas Stanley Malcolm Graham, MB, BS, Senior Medical Officer, Ministry of Health, Nyasaland.
- Harold Roy Hack, Senior Planning Officer, Federal Department of Conservation and Extension.
- Madge Robinson, Special Grade Stenographer, Federal Ministry of Home Affairs.
- The Reverend Father Henry Swift, SJ, of Salisbury. For public services.

=== British Empire Medal (BEM) ===
Military Division

- Warrant Officer Class I James Kidney, Rhodesia and Nyasaland Army.
- Warrant Officer Class II Diston Master, Rhodesia and Nyasaland Army.

Civil Division

- Arthur Henry Cubitt, Senior Driver, Central Mechanical Equipment Department.
