= Peter Hampshire =

British diplomat (1912–1981)

Sir Peter Hampshire KCMG

British High Commissioner to Trinidad and Tobago
- In office 1966–1970
- Preceded by: Sir Norman Costar
- Succeeded by: Roland Hunt

Personal details
- Born: 1 December 1912
- Died: 4 July 1981 (aged 68)
- Education: Oriel College, Oxford
- Occupation: Diplomat

Sir George Peter Hampshire (1 December 1912 – 4 July 1981) was a British diplomat who served as British high commissioner to Trinidad and Tobago from 1966 to 1970.

== Early life and education ==
Hampshire was born on 1 December 1912, the son of G. N. Hampshire and Marie Hampshire (née West). He was educated at Repton School and Oriel College, Oxford.

== Career ==
Hampshire joined the War Office in 1935, and in 1946 was transferred to the Foreign Office (German Section) and the Control Office for Germany and Austria. From 1948 to 1951, he served at the High Commission at Ottawa, and from 1953 to 1955 at the Deputy High Commission at Dacca, before he was appointed head of the Colombo Plan Department at the Commonwealth Relations Office. From 1957 to 1960, he served in Buenos Aires with the rank of counsellor.

In 1961, he was appointed head of the Western and Middle East Department at the Commonwealth Relations Office. From 1961 to 1966, he served there as assistant under-secretary in several departments: Commonwealth Relations (Foreign Affairs Division) (1961–62); Commonwealth Relations (Establishments and Organisation) (1962–1964); and Foreign and Commonwealth Affairs while also deputy chief of Administration (1965–66). From 1966 to 1970, he served as high commissioner to Trinidad and Tobago.

In 1970, Hampshire became a member of the chairman’s panel of the civil service selection board, a post he held until 1977.

== Personal life and death ==
Hampshire married Eve Buhler (née Rowell) former wife of Robert Buhler RA, the artist, in 1956. There were no children.

Hampshire died on 4 July 1981, aged 68.

== Honours ==
Hampshire was appointed Companion of the Order of St Michael and St George (CMG) in the 1963 New Year Honours, and promoted to Knight Commander (KCMG) in the 1967 New Year Honours.

== See also ==
- Trinidad and Tobago–United Kingdom relations

Diplomatic posts
Preceded by Sir Norman Costar	British High Commissioner to Trinidad and Tobago; 1966–1970	Succeeded by Roland Hunt
