= Ramsbotham =

Surname

Ramsbotham is a surname. Notable people with the surname include:

- David Ramsbotham, Baron Ramsbotham GCB CBE (born 1934), retired British Army officer, later Her Majesty's Chief Inspector of Prisons
- Herwald Ramsbotham, 1st Viscount Soulbury GCMG, GCVO, OBE, MC, PC (1887–1971), British Conservative politician
- John Alexander Ramsbotham (1906–1989), eminent Anglican clergyman during the middle third of the 20th century
- Peter Ramsbotham, 3rd Viscount Soulbury, GCMG, GCVO, DL (1919–2010), former British diplomat and colonial administrator
- Ramsbotham Jump, a type of interstellar teleporter in Robert A. Heinlein's novel Tunnel in the Sky.

== See also ==
- Ramsbottom
