= List of high commissioners of the United Kingdom to Cyprus =

The high commissioner of the United Kingdom to Cyprus is the United Kingdom's foremost diplomatic representative in the Republic of Cyprus.

Previously a territory of the Ottoman Empire, a British protectorate under Ottoman suzerainty was established over Cyprus by the Cyprus Convention of 4 June 1878. The United Kingdom declared war on the Ottoman Empire on 5 November 1914 and annexed Cyprus. Turkey recognised British possession of Cyprus by the Treaty of Lausanne on 24 July 1923 and the island became a Crown colony on 10 March 1925. Following the Zürich and London Agreement of 19 February 1959, Cyprus became independent on 16 August 1960. The Republic of Cyprus is a member of the British Commonwealth, so the British diplomatic representative is a high commissioner.

== Heads of mission ==
=== High commissioners (1878–1925) ===
- 1878–1879: Sir Garnet Wolseley
- 1879–1886: Sir Robert Biddulph
- 1886–1892: Sir Henry Ernest Bulwer
- 1892–1898: Sir Walter Sendall
- 1898–1904: Sir William Haynes Smith
- 1904–1911: Sir Charles King-Harman
- 1911–1915: Hamilton Goold-Adams
- 1915–1918: Sir John Clauson (died in office)
- 1918–1920: Sir Malcolm Stevenson (acting)
- 1920–1925: Sir Malcolm Stevenson

=== Governors (1925–1960) ===
- 1925–1926: Sir Malcolm Stevenson
- 1926–1932: Sir Ronald Storrs
- 1932–1933: Sir Reginald Stubbs
- 1933–1939: Sir Richmond Palmer
- 1939–1941: William Battershill
- 1941–1946: Charles Woolley
- 1946–1949: Reginald Fletcher, 1st Baron Winster
- 1949–1954: Sir Andrew Wright
- 1954–1955: Sir Robert Armitage
- 1955–1957: Sir John Harding
- 1957–1960: Sir Hugh Foot

=== High commissioners (1960–present) ===
- 1961–1964: Sir Arthur Clark
- 1964–1965: Sir Alec Bishop
- 1965–1967: Sir David Hunt
- 1967–1969: Sir Norman Costar
- 1969–1971: Peter Ramsbotham
- 1971–1972: Robert Edmonds
- 1973–1975: Stephen Olver
- 1975–1979: Donald Gordon
- 1979–1982: Peregrine Rhodes
- 1982–1988: William Wilberforce
- 1988–1990: Humphrey Maud
- 1990–1994: David Dain
- 1994–1999: David Madden
- 1999–2001: Edward Clay
- 2001–2005: Lyn Parker
- 2005–2010: Peter Millett
- 2010–2014: Matthew Kidd
- 2014–2016: Ric Todd
- 2016–2018: Matthew Kidd
- 2018–2022: Stephen Lillie
- 2022–2024: Irfan Siddiq
- 2024–present: Michael Tatham
