= Arthur Clark (diplomat) =

British diplomat (1908–1967)

Sir Arthur Clark KCMG CBE

British High Commissioner to Cyprus
- In office 1961–1964
- Preceded by: Sir Hugh Foot (as Governor)
- Succeeded by: Sir Alec Bishop

Personal details
- Born: 5 December 1908
- Died: 29 May 1967 (aged 58)
- Children: 2
- Education: University of Edinburgh, Trinity College, Oxford
- Occupation: Diplomat

Sir William Arthur Weir Clark (5 December 1908 – 29 May 1967) was a British diplomat who served as British High Commissioner to Cyprus from 1961 to 1964.

== Early life and education ==
Clark was born on 5 December 1908 in Scotland, the eldest son of Rev W. W. Clark of Midlothian. He was educated at Stewart's Melville College, Edinburgh; University of Edinburgh; and Trinity College, Oxford.

== Career ==
Clark entered the Colonial Administrative Service and began his career in 1931 working in Kenya as a district officer, and in 1939 was seconded to the Dominions Office. He was principal private secretary to two Secretaries of State for the Dominions, Clement Attlee and Viscount Cranborne between 1942 and 1945. He was a member of the delegation to the United Nations Conference in San Francisco in 1945. He then served at the Commonwealth Relations Office as chief secretary to the Central African Council from 1950 to 1954 where he was credited with mending relations strained by the dispute regarding the Bamangwato chieftaincy in the Bechuanaland Protectorate, and then served as assistant under-secretary in the Foreign Affairs Department from 1954 to 1956.

After Clark was transferred to India as deputy high commissioner in Delhi, serving from 1956 to 1958, he returned to the Commonwealth Relations Office as assistant under-secretary (Foreign Affairs Department) remaining in the post from 1958 to 1960, and in 1960, was responsible for the successful conclusion of the negotiations over the RAF base in the Maldives. In 1961, he was appointed High Commissioner to Cyprus after the country joined the Commonwealth, having been appointed in 1960 as the UK's first envoy to Cyprus after it became independent, a post he held until 1964. He then returned to the Commonwealth Relations Office as assistant under-secretary (Information and Culture department) before retiring in 1967.

== Personal life and death ==
Clark married Margaret Dobbie in 1935 and they had a son and a daughter.

Clark died on 29 May 1967, aged 58.

== Honours ==
Clark was appointed Commander of the Order of the British Empire (CBE) in the 1948 Birthday Honours. He was appointed Companion of the Order of St Michael and St George (CMG) in the 1952 Birthday Honours, and promoted to Knight Commander (KCMG) in the 1961 Birthday Honours.

== See also ==
- Cyprus–United Kingdom relations

Diplomatic posts
Preceded by Sir Hugh Foot	British High Commissioner to Cyprus; 1961–1964	Succeeded by Sir Alec Bishop
