= Uganda–United Kingdom relations =

- Uganda: United Kingdom

Diplomatic mission
- British High Commission, Kampala: High Commission of Uganda, London

Envoy
- High Commissioner Kate Airey: High Commissioner; Julius Peter Moto

Uganda and the United Kingdom maintain bilateral relations. Uganda has a high commission in London and the United Kingdom has a high commission in Kampala. For 2022/2023, UK's aid budget to Uganda was listed at £32.8 million.

FCDO lists its priorities in Uganda to be:

- To maintain and develop the political relationship between the countries and provide advice and guidance on governance issues.
- Through UK Department for International Trade, providing assistance to both British and Ugandan businesses.
- Provide consular support to British nationals living and working in Uganda.

It also lists that the top priorities for aid projects in the country include:

- Promoting good governance and combating corruption.
- Improving maternal and reproductive health.
- Supporting economic development and growth including youth skills and job creation.
- Increasing access to financial services and regional trade.
- Protecting the poorest and most vulnerable.

== Citizens overseas ==
In 1972, around 27,000 Ugandan Asians were permitted to move to the UK through the Uganda Resettlement Board following being expelled from the country by President Idi Amin.

The Office for National Statistics estimates that in 2014, 51,000 people born in Uganda were resident in the UK.

An estimated 3,000 UK nationals live and work in Uganda.

== High level visits ==
Prominent British figures have visited Uganda, including:

- Lord Bach, as Parliamentary Secretary, Department for Environment, Food & Rural Affairs (August 2005).
- Hilary Benn, as Secretary of State for International Development (April 2005 and May 2006).
- Queen Elizabeth II, Prince Philip, Duke of Edinburgh, Charles, Prince of Wales and Camilla, Duchess of Cornwall (November 2007).
- Gordon Brown, as Prime Minister, for the Commonwealth Heads of Government Meeting (November 2007).
- David Miliband, as Foreign Secretary, for the Commonwealth Heads of Government Meeting (November 2007).
- Ivan Lewis, as Under Secretary of State for International Development (February 2009).
- Boris Johnson, as Foreign Secretary (March 2017).
- Vicky Ford, as Parliamentary Under-Secretary of State for Africa, Latin America and the Caribbean (January 2022).

Ugandan Government Ministers have also visited the UK:

- Yoweri Museveni, as President (March 2008 and March 2009).
- Sam Kutesa, as Minister of Foreign Affairs, (September 2007, March 2008, March 2009 and April 2018 for the Commonwealth Heads of Government Meeting).
- Amama Mbabazi, as Minister of Security (September 2008).

== See also ==
- List of high commissioners of the United Kingdom to Uganda
