= Derek March =

British diplomat (1902–1974)

Sir Derek March KBE

British High Commissioner to Uganda
- In office 1986–1990
- Preceded by: Colin McLean
- Succeeded by: Charles Cullimore

Personal details
- Born: 9 December 1930
- Died: 15 February 1992 (aged 61)
- Children: 3
- Education: Birkbeck, University of London
- Occupation: Diplomat

Sir Derek Maxwell March (9 December 1930 – 15 February 1992) was a British diplomat who served as High Commissioner to Uganda from 1986 to 1990.

== Early life and education ==
March was born on 9 December 1930, the son of Frank March, a builder from Plymouth and Vera née Ward. He was educated at Devonport High School and Birkbeck, University of London.

== Career ==
March entered the Diplomatic Service in 1949 aged 19, and then after serving two years' national service, he joined the Foreign Office in 1951. He was at Bonn in 1955 and was vice consul in Hanover in 1957. He was then assistant trade commissioner at Salisbury, Southern Rhodesia, in 1959, and consul for Senegal and consul for Mauritania at Dakkar in 1962. After returning to London as first secretary in the Foreign Office in 1964, he was at Rawalpindi as first secretary (political) in 1968, and first secretary (commercial) Peking from 1970 to 1974 at a time when British firms were seeking business opportunities as relations between China and the West began to improve.

March was appointed counsellor at the Foreign and Commonwealth Office in 1974, and in the following year was seconded to the Department of Trade. From 1977 to 1982, while serving as consul for Macau residing in Hong Kong, he was senior British trade commissioner for Hong Kong and the most senior British (as opposed to Hong Kong government) official in the colony. With Hong Kong involved in large scale infrastructure development, including the new underground railway system, many British companies were seeking to participate in the projects. From 1982 to 1986, he was counsellor, seconded to the Department of Trade and Industry.

In 1986, March was appointed High Commissioner to Uganda. This was the time when President Museveni came to power and stability began to return to the country. According to The Times, "The British High Commissioner, Mr Derek March, immeasurably helped by a visit from the Princess Royal, has restored Anglo-Ugandan relations to a level of friendliness not seen for many years." March remained in the post until his retirement in 1990.

== Personal life and death ==
March married Sally Riggs in 1955 and they had a son and two daughters.

March died on 15 February 1992, aged 61.

== Honours ==
March was appointed Officer of the Order of the British Empire (OBE) in the 1973 New Year Honours, and promoted to Commander of the Order of the British Empire (CBE) in the 1982 Birthday Honours, and promoted to Knight Commander of the Order of the British Empire (KBE) in the 1988 Birthday Honours.

== See also ==
- Uganda–United Kingdom relations

Diplomatic posts
| Preceded by Colin McLean | British High Commissioner to Uganda; 1986–1990 | Succeeded by Charles Cullimore |
