= Director of the Victoria and Albert Museum =

The Director of the Victoria and Albert Museum is the head of the Victoria and Albert Museum in London, a post currently held by Tristram Hunt, who succeeded Martin Roth, who died in August 2017, months after he announced he would resign in January. The postholder is responsible for that institution's general administration and reports its accounts to the British Government.

The actual governance of the museum, however, is delegated to its board of trustees; these are appointed individually by the British Prime Minister. The National Heritage Act 1983, which established the museum's board of trustees, provides the prime minister's power to appoint the members and the chair of the board of trustees, and provides for the director to be appointed by this board, with the approval of the prime minister.

== List of directors ==
Portrait	Director	Served	Post held
	Sir Henry Cole (1808–1882)	1852–1873	Organised and conducted the two museums from which the Victoria and Albert Museum grew: the Museum of Oriental Art and the South Kensington Museum
	Sir Philip Cunliffe-Owen, (1828–1894)	1874–1893	Director of the South Kensington Museum
	John Henry Middleton (1846–1896)	1893–1896	Director of the Art Museum (division of the Victoria and Albert Museum)
	Sir Caspar Purdon Clarke (1846–1911)	1896–1905	Director of the Art Museum (division of the Victoria and Albert Museum)
	Arthur Banks Skinner (1861–1911)	1905–1908	Director of the Art Museum (division of the Victoria and Albert Museum)
	Sir Cecil Harcourt-Smith, (1859–1944)	1909–1924	Director and secretary of the Victoria and Albert Museum
	Sir Eric Maclagan (1879–1951)	1924–1945	Director and secretary of the Victoria and Albert Museum
	Sir Leigh Ashton (1897–1983)	1945–1955	Director and secretary of the Victoria and Albert Museum
	Sir Trenchard Cox (1905–1995)	1956–1966	Director and Secretary of the Victoria and Albert Museum
	Sir John Pope-Hennessy (1913–1994)	1967–1973	Director and secretary of the Victoria and Albert Museum
	Sir Roy Strong (born 1935)	1973–1987	Director and secretary of the Victoria and Albert Museum
	Dame Elizabeth Esteve-Coll (1938–2024)	1987–1995	Director and secretary of the Victoria and Albert Museum
	Alan Borg (born 1942)	1995–2001	Director and secretary of the Victoria and Albert Museum
	Sir Mark Jones (born 1951)	2001–2011	Director of the Victoria and Albert Museum
	Martin Roth (1955–2017)	2011–2016	Director of the Victoria and Albert Museum
	Tristram Hunt (born 1974)	2017–present	Director of the Victoria and Albert Museum
