= Yin Xin =

Yin Xin may refer to:

- Yin Xin (painter), Chinese painter
- Ivy Yin or Yin Xin, Taiwanese actress
