= John Hunt, Baron Hunt of Fawley =

British general practitioner

The Right Honourable The Lord Hunt of Fawley CBE, FRCP, FRCS, FRCGP, FRACGP
- Born: 3 July 1905; Secunderabad, British India
- Died: 28 December 1987 (aged 82); Fawley, Henley on Thames, England
- Education: Charterhouse School
- Alma mater: St. Bartholomew's Hospital Medical College; University of Oxford
- Occupation: General Practitioner
- Known for: Co-founding RCGP
- Spouse: Elisabeth Evill
- Children: 5

John Henderson Hunt, Baron Hunt of Fawley (3 July 1905 – 28 December 1987) was a British general practitioner (GP) who, in 1952, co-founded the College of General Practitioners. In 1967 the royal prefix was approved and the college was renamed the Royal College of General Practitioners (RCGP). He became its president in the same year.

Hunt was born in India, the son of a surgeon, and sent to England as a young child, accompanied by his mother. Educated at Charterhouse School and then at Oxford, he studied medicine at St Bartholomew's Medical College and qualified in 1931. His early house jobs were at St Bartholomew's Hospital, and later at the National Hospital, Queen Square, London.

During the Second World War, he was a Wing Commander with the Royal Air Force. On his return to civilian life, he entered general practice, working in Sloane Street, London. He was president of the Hunterian Society, the Section of General Practice at the Royal Society of Medicine, the Harveian Society and the Medical Society of London. In 1973 he was the first GP to be made a life peer as Baron Hunt of Fawley, of Fawley in the County of Buckingham.

== Early life ==
John Hunt was born on 3 July 1905, in Secunderabad, India, where Hunt's father, Edmund Henderson Hunt (1874–1952) was a surgeon with the Nizam of Hyderabad's State Railways. The Hunt family members were goldsmiths and silversmiths in the eighteenth and nineteenth centuries; John Samuel Hunt (1785-1865) being initially in business with his uncle-by-marriage, Paul Storr; also descended from John Samuel Hunt are the diplomat Roland Hunt, his son, the meteorologist Julian Hunt, Baron Hunt of Chesterton, and grandchildren, historian and former Labour politician Tristram Hunt and his sister, writer Jemima Hunt.

Hunt's mother, Laura Mary, was the daughter of Colonel Sir James Buckingham, secretary of the Indian Tea Association. His younger brother was Alan Henderson Hunt DM, MCh, FRCS. He returned to England as a young child with his mother and attended Charterhouse School. His father continued to work in India until 1931. As a result of contracting diphtheria whilst at school, he is believed to be one of the last cases in England to have his tonsils painted with cocaine and then removed by guillotine.

In 1924, Hunt graduated in physiology from Oxford and in 1926, won the Theodore Williams scholarship in physiology. In 1928, he won the Radcliffe Scholarship in pharmacology.

== Medical career ==
Hunt undertook his early clinical training at St Bartholomew's Hospital Medical School in 1931. Becoming second assistant at the Medical Unit at St Bartholomew's Hospital in 1933, he subsequently spent two years in a medical house job at the National Hospital for Nervous Diseases.

He became a member of the Royal College of Physicians in 1934, and in 1935 he acquired, from the University of Oxford, his Doctor of Medicine for a thesis on Raynaud syndrome that appeared in the Quarterly Journal of Medicine a year later. In 1936 he returned to St Bartholomew's Hospital as chief assistant to the consultative neurological clinic. He originally planned a career in neurology but changed direction to enter general practice, to the surprise of his colleagues.

By 1937, he took a job with Dr George Cregan in the practice at 83 Sloane Street, following which, in 1941, he married Elisabeth Ernestine, daughter of architect Norman Evill, FRIBA, chief draughtsman for Edwin Lutyens from 1899 to 1902; they had five children: twin sons who became general practitioners, a son who died in childhood, and two daughters. He joined the Royal Air Force as a neurologist at the onset of war and by the end of the conflict had reached the rank of wing commander. After the war, in 1945, Hunt set up a private practice at 54 Sloane Street. He chose to stay independent in 1948, unlike many of his colleagues who joined the new National Health Service.

== Royal Society of Medicine's general practice section ==
After the end of the war, Hunt became committed to forming a college for general practitioners to oversee education, postgraduate training and ensure the highest standards of general practice. The Royal Society of Medicine's GP section was established in 1950, following a case put to its council by Dr. G. M. Kerr and Dr. Geoffrey Barber and granted on the understanding that it would deal with matters of education only and not politics. Hunt was one of the first to become a member and became its president in 1956. This was, according to Lord Horder, "the seed bed" for many ideas that were later established in the RCGP.

== Royal College of General Practitioners ==
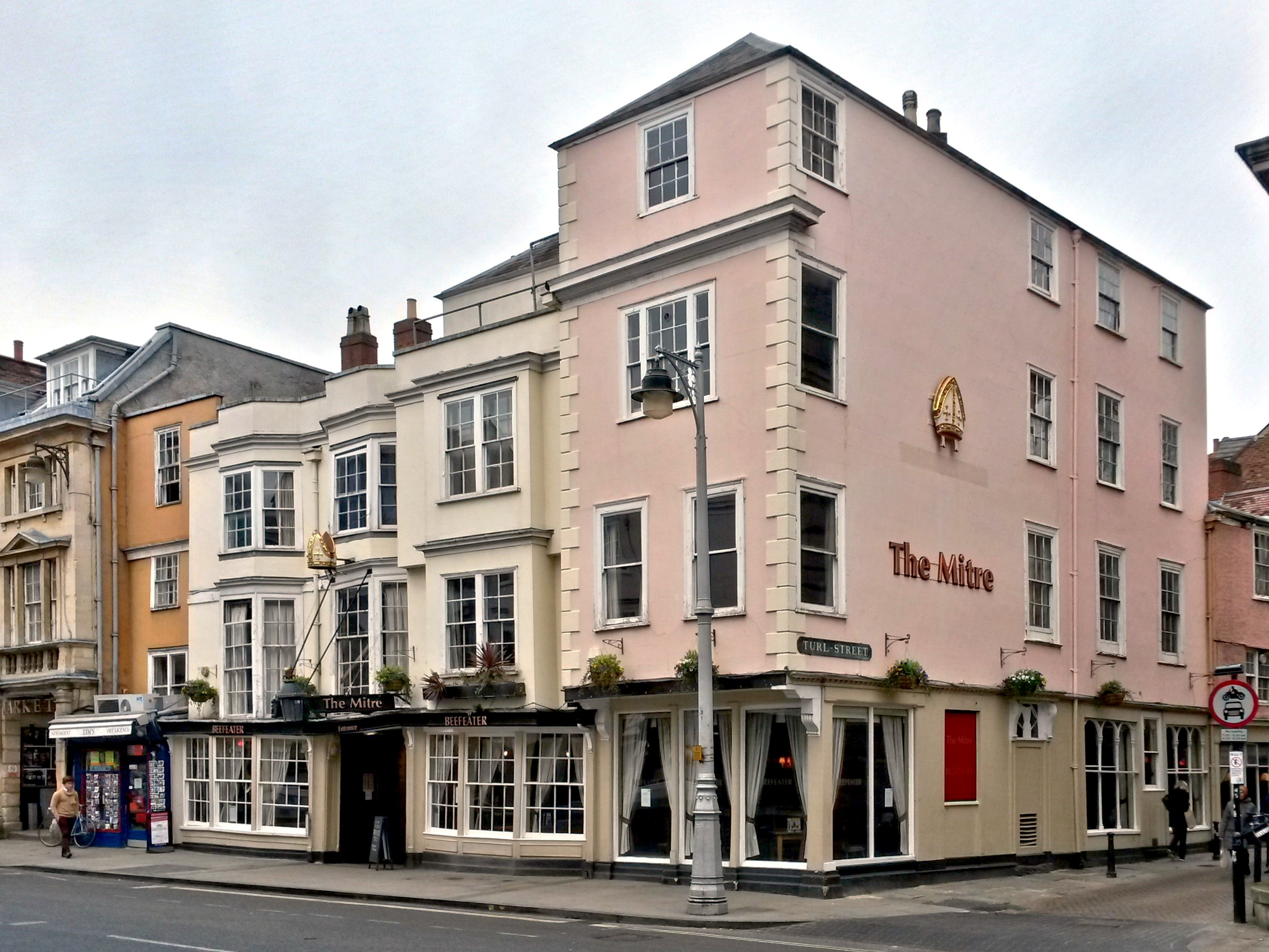
The Mitre Hotel, Oxford, where Hunt recalled Barber and Jameson discussing plans to form a college in the early 1950s.

Described also as a "dress rehearsal for the foundation of the College", the origins of the College for general practice appear to have materialised when certain key players from RSM's general practice section, Worshipful Society of Apothecaries and other particularly non-London based GPs, including Fraser Rose, met together.

Hunt also recalled Barber and Sir Wilson Jameson, chatting outside Oxford's Mitre pub and hatching a plan to form a College. Despite the RSM wishing to stay neutral, seven members of the RSM's first two councils of general practice were heavily involved in the establishment of the College. Hence, in the words of John Fry, "there was a close liaison between ourselves and the Society".

At one stage, the question as to whether a "college" or "faculty" be pursued, Hunt had sought the opinion of his cousin, Lord Horder, the royal physician. Horder's opposition to either, although later revoked, disappointed Hunt and encouraged further his defence of general practice.

Following the emphasis on the plight of GPs in the Cohen report, there appeared an urgency to form a college and Hunt questioned the role of the new section of general practice of the RSM. A further report by a visiting Australian physician, highlighting the worst of general practice, further lowered GP morale, but brought general practice to the front pages of politics. Subsequently, discussions with Lord Webb-Johnson (president of RSM), Abercrombie (1st president of GP section and eventual RCGP co-founder) and the RSM executive led to a request in 1951 to support the forming of a college. This was turned down because it was "too political".

Along with other concerned GPs, Hunt offered the idea for a "college" in a letter to the General Practice Review Committee of the British Medical Association (BMA). The letter was also sent to the British Medical Journal and The Lancet, and was co-signed by Dr Fraser Rose:

There is a College of Physicians, a College of Surgeons, a College of Obstetricians and Gynaecologists, a College of Nursing, a College of Midwives, and a College of Veterinary Surgeons… but there is no college or academic body to represent primarily the interests of the largest group of medical personnel in this country – twenty thousand general practitioners.

Its response was aggravating. As well as receiving many encouraging comments, resistance was obvious, predominantly from the presidents of the traditional Royal Colleges:

"I had far rather start with a big idea in a small way than a small idea in a big way" wrote John Hunt to Fraser Rose on 3 December 1951.

A steering committee was formed, with members including former Minister of Health (1943–1945), Sir Henry Willink, who agreed to be chairman. The College of General Practitioners was formally established on 19 November 1952. More than 2,000 doctors enrolled in the first six months. Hunt was the college council's first honorary secretary, and he followed that by serving as president for three years (1967–1970).

Hunt's practice at 54 Sloane Street later became the second headquarters for the college.

Although Hunt had failed to gain official support from the RSM to form a college, the close connection between the GP section members and the college steering committee was undeniable. Following the establishment of the college, he spent numerous evenings in 1953, in the RSM basement researching historical attempts to form a college and why they failed.

== Other roles ==
Hunt was the main medical officer for the Provincial Mutual Life Assurance Association, and the Royal Air Force took him as an honorary consultant in general practice. In 1953, he became the Hunterian Society's president. Three years later, he was elected president of the general practice section at the RSM, and by 1970, he was president of the Harveian Society. In addition, he took presidencies at the Chelsea Clinical Society in 1971 and at the Medical Society of London in 1973.

In addition to the numerous presidencies, Hunt had many other senior appointments. Between 1948 and 1966, St Dunstans' appointed him as a consultant physician, then became its council member until 1983.

Charterhouse School, Sutton's Hospital, Old Charterhouse and the National Hospital, Queen Square, all had him as a governor. Between 1948 and 1969, the Medical Protection Society appointed Hunt to its council. At the same time, he advised the BBC on their General Advisory Council.

The Medical Services Review Committee, Medical Commission on Accidents and the Royal College of Surgeons all at some point had Hunt as a member.

== Honours ==
Hunt was appointed a CBE in 1970. Subsequently, he toured the country and overseas, advocating his college and the teaching of general practice in universities.

He received numerous honorary fellowships, including the Royal Society of Medicine, the Australian College of General Practice, the American Academy of Family Physicians, and the Singapore College of General Practice.

The Royal College of Surgeons elected him a fellow in 1966. He was the first general practitioner to become a life peer, being created Baron Hunt of Fawley in the County of Buckingham on 25 June 1973. He was an important contributor to the debate on the Medical Act of 1978. In 1980, he received the gold medal of the British Medical Association and became an honorary fellow of Green College, University of Oxford.

Coat of arms of John Hunt, Baron Hunt of Fawley

Crest
Upon a wreath Argent and Azure on two mountain peaks the first higher than the second a chamois statant reguardant Proper.
Escutcheon
Argent a Himalayan black bear passant Proper a chief dancetty Azure.
Supporters
Dexter on a mount of grass and reedmace Proper issuant from water barry wavy Argent and Azure a swan wings elevated and addorsed Proper, sinister on a rock a buzzard wings also elevated and addorsed Proper.
Motto
Endeavour

== Later life and legacy ==
In later life, Hunt was blind and had Parkinson's disease. He remained confined to his bed for the last three years of his life and died on 28 December 1987 at his home in Fawley, near Henley-on-Thames. His son Dr Jonathan Hunt and granddaughter Dr Chiara Hunt both followed him into the Sloane Street practice. Jonathan Hunt's daughter Marina is the wife of broadcaster Ben Fogle; her sister Olivia, formerly a girlfriend of William, Prince of Wales, married Nicholas Wilkinson, son of Dame Heather Hallett.

Established in 1992 to commemorate the College's 40th anniversary, the RCGP awards the John Hunt Lectureship to someone who is not medically qualified. The Prince of Wales gave the inaugural lecture.
