= Tristram Hunt =

British historian, politician, and journalist

The Honourable Sir Tristram Hunt FRHistS
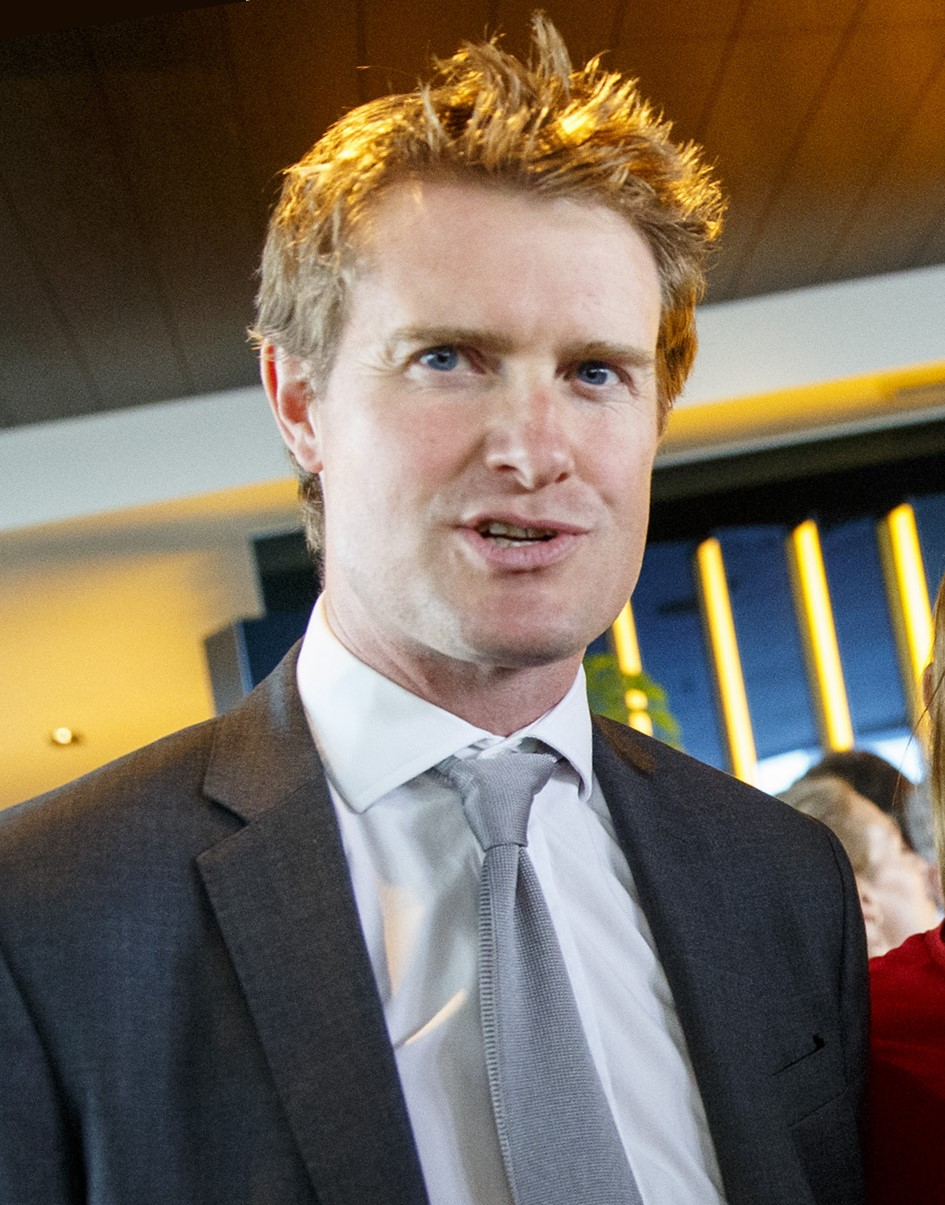
- Hunt in 2015

Shadow Secretary of State for Education
- In office 7 October 2013 – 12 September 2015
- Leader: Ed Miliband; Harriet Harman (acting)
- Preceded by: Stephen Twigg
- Succeeded by: Lucy Powell

Shadow Minister for Further Education
- In office 17 April 2013 – 6 October 2013
- Leader: Ed Miliband
- Preceded by: Karen Buck
- Succeeded by: Rushanara Ali

Member of Parliament for Stoke-on-Trent Central
- In office 6 May 2010 – 23 January 2017
- Preceded by: Mark Fisher
- Succeeded by: Gareth Snell

Personal details
- Born: Tristram Julian William Hunt; 31 May 1974 (age 52) Cambridge, England
- Party: Labour
- Spouse: Juliet Thornback
- Children: 3
- Parent: Julian Hunt, Baron Hunt of Chesterton (father)
- Education: University College School
- Alma mater: Trinity College, Cambridge; King's College, Cambridge

Academic background
- Thesis: Civic Thought in Britain, c.1820–c.1860 (2000)
- Doctoral advisor: Gareth Stedman Jones

Sir Tristram Julian William Hunt (born 31 May 1974) is a British historian, broadcast journalist and former politician who has been Director of the Victoria and Albert Museum since 2017. He served as the Labour Member of Parliament (MP) for Stoke-on-Trent Central from 2010 to 2017, and Shadow Secretary of State for Education from 2013 to 2015.

He has written several books, presented history programmes on television, and was a regular writer for The Guardian and The Observer.

== Early life and education ==
Hunt was born in Cambridge, the son of Julian Hunt, Baron Hunt of Chesterton, a meteorologist and leader of the Labour Party group on Cambridge City Council in 1972–73, and the grandson of Roland Hunt, a British diplomat. The Hunt family were goldsmiths and silversmiths in the eighteenth and nineteenth centuries, John Samuel Hunt (1785–1865) being in business with his uncle-by-marriage, Paul Storr; also descended from John Samuel Hunt was John Hunt, Baron Hunt of Fawley.

Hunt is furthermore the great-grandson of Maxwell Garnett, barrister and educationist, and great-great-grandson of William Garnett, an academic and professor in physics. As such, he is a cousin of Virginia Bottomley, Baroness Bottomley of Nettlestone, and of Peter Jay, former son-in-law of the late Labour Prime Minister James Callaghan. Through Bottomley, he is related by marriage to Sir Peter Bottomley and former Labour MP and economist Kitty Ussher.

Tristram Hunt was educated at University College School, an all-boys' private school in Hampstead, north London. There, he achieved two As (History and Latin) and a B (English Literature) at A-Level. He took a first-class degree in History at Trinity College, Cambridge, in 1995.

He later attended the University of Chicago, and was for a time an Associate Fellow of the Centre for History and Economics at King's College, Cambridge. He undertook postgraduate study at the University of Cambridge and completed his Doctor of Philosophy (PhD) degree in 2000. His thesis, written under the supervision of Gareth Stedman Jones, was titled Civic Thought in Britain, c.1820–c.1860. While at Cambridge, he was a member of the amateur theatrical club the Footlights, where he was a contemporary of David Mitchell and Robert Webb.

== Academic career ==
Hunt was a Fellow of the Institute for Public Policy Research and sits on the board of the New Local Government Network (2004). He has made many appearances on television, presenting programmes on the English Civil War (2002), the theories of Sir Isaac Newton (Great Britons, 2002), and the rise of the middle class, and makes regular appearances on BBC Radio 4, having presented broadcasts on such topics as the history of the signature. His first book was The English Civil War: At First Hand (2002).

His specialism is urban history, specifically during the Victorian era, and it is this subject which provided him with his second book, Building Jerusalem (2004). This book, covering such notable Victorian minds as John Ruskin, Joseph Chamberlain and Thomas Carlyle, received many favourable reviews but some criticism, notably a scathing review in The Times Literary Supplement by J. Mordaunt Crook.

Hunt wrote Making our Mark, a publication celebrating of the eightieth anniversary of CPRE, The Countryside Charity, in 2006. He then completed a BBC series entitled The Protestant Revolution, examining the influence of Protestantism on British and international attitudes to work and leisure for broadcast on BBC Four. In 2007 Hunt was a judge for the Samuel Johnson Prize, the winner being Imperial Life in the Emerald City by Rajiv Chandrasekaran.

Hunt wrote a biography of Friedrich Engels, The Frock-Coated Communist: The Revolutionary Life of Friedrich Engels, which was published in May 2009 by Penguin Books. For the book, Hunt researched at German and Russian libraries and begins with an account of his own visit to the city of Engels in Russia. The biography received a number of favourable reviews, including one from Roy Hattersley, the former Deputy Leader of the Labour Party, in The Observer. While Terrell Carver, a scholar of political theory at the University of Bristol, described it as "trivialising," and "unhistorical."

Hunt was a lecturer in modern British History at Queen Mary University of London. On 18 May 2013, Dr Hunt delivered his lecture 'Aristocracy and Industry: the Sutherlands in Staffordshire' at The Marc Fitch Lectures.

Hunt's book Ten Cities That Made an Empire was published by Allen Lane in 2014. It was dubbed a "lively study of imperial outposts" by the historian Robert Service, writing for The Guardian.

== Political career ==
A member of the Labour Party, Hunt supported the party as an activist for several years before working on the party's staff. Hunt worked for the Labour Party at Millbank Tower during the 1997 general election; he also worked at the party headquarters during the following 2001 general election. During the 2005 general election he campaigned for Oona King in Bethnal Green and Bow.

Hunt twice submitted his name unsuccessfully for selection as a Labour parliamentary candidate: Liverpool West Derby, where Stephen Twigg was selected (2007), and Leyton and Wanstead, where John Cryer was selected (2009).

Hunt was selected to contest the constituency of Stoke-on-Trent Central on 1 April 2010, succeeding Labour's outgoing MP, Mark Fisher. Because the candidacy was filled just before the election, the shortlist was drawn up by Labour's ruling National Executive Committee selection panel, with none on the shortlist local to Stoke-on-Trent. This led to the secretary of the Constituency Labour Party, Gary Elsby, standing against Hunt as an independent candidate in protest. Despite the controversy of being "parachuted in" to the district, Hunt was elected with 38.8% of the vote. Although the election was the constituency's closest-fought contest in decades, Hunt still had a majority of 5,566 over his nearest rival.

Hunt was appointed a Shadow Education Minister in April 2013, replacing Karen Buck who advanced as Parliamentary Private Secretary to Ed Miliband. On 7 October 2013, Hunt was promoted to the Shadow Cabinet, replacing Stephen Twigg as Shadow Secretary of State for Education.

In February 2014, Hunt crossed an authorised University and College Union picket line at Queen Mary University of London to teach his students about "Marx, Engels and the Making of Marxism", defending himself on the grounds that although he was not a member of the union, he supported the right to strike and picket by those who had been ballotted. He was strongly criticised by West Bromwich East MP Tom Watson, who described Hunt's behaviour as "preposterous".

Hunt was re-elected in the 2015 election with a majority of 5,179. In 2015, Hunt ran for the leadership of the Labour Party, but dropped out after less than a week after he was nowhere near gathering the 35 nominations from MPs he needed to stand. On 12 September 2015, it became known he was leaving the shadow cabinet following Jeremy Corbyn's election as Labour leader because of their "substantial political differences", as Hunt told the Press Association.

On 13 January 2017, he announced that he would be resigning as an MP in order to take up the post of Director of the Victoria and Albert Museum in London. He formally resigned, taking the post of Steward of the Chiltern Hundreds, on 23 January 2017. His successor as MP, Gareth Snell, retained the seat for Labour in the subsequent by-election on 23 February 2017.

=== Political views ===
Hunt was formerly a trustee of the Heritage Lottery Fund and has a column with the British Sunday paper The Observer. He wrote an article in the New Statesman comparing Cromwell's Republic to the Islamic fundamentalism dominant in Afghanistan at that time (2001).

Speaking of his constituency, Hunt said that "The key to helping manufacturing is investing in education and schools and also selling Stoke nationally and internationally as a place to invest." He also criticised the local council's decision "to try to obliterate the past out and sort of 'cleanse', removing the old bottle ovens and other relics". He instead believed that the city's reputation as a quality pottery maker should be exploited. He said he could better serve his constituency were he to become a Government Minister.

Hunt was accused in February 2015 of implying in a BBC Question Time discussion on teachers without qualifications that nuns do not make good teachers. His comments were criticised by Conservative MPs and by the Scottish Conservative leader Ruth Davidson. Hunt stated that he did not mean to cause offence to nuns.

In 2014, he proposed that private schools should be required to form "partnerships" with local state schools if they wanted to keep their charitable status.

Hunt has been a member of Labour Friends of Israel.

== Victoria and Albert Museum directorship ==
In February 2017, Hunt became the Director of the V&A. In this role he has advocated for the necessity for creative subjects to be taught in state schools, fearing that designer jobs are considered 'only for the posh.'

In 2020, the V&A will stage the largest exhibition of Iranian art outside of Iran, called 'Epic Iran'. But crisis in the Middle East may make some of the items unavailable. Hunt, when asked to comment, said that the exhibition was still likely to go ahead, but, in an article for The Art Newspaper, admitted that "some of the loans might now be less forthcoming and sponsorship more of a challenge."

In June 2023, Hunt ordered the removal of two books on gender and sexual orientation, as well as a poster by the charity Stonewall that read "Some people are trans, get over it!", from the Young V&A, ahead of the museum's reopening. The V&A Staff LGBTQ Working Group and trade unions PCS and Prospect opposed the removals. Union representatives appealed the decision in a meeting with Hunt, who rejected their request to have the items returned to the museum.

Hunt has been vocal in his support of the Sackler family, the American billionaire family linked to the opioid crisis. In 2019 he defended the family's contributions to the museum, refused to remove their name from the museum's courtyard and said "we're proud to have been supported by the Sacklers." In 2022 the museum reversed course and removed the name.

In July and August 2026, workers in the PCS and Prospect trade unions at V&A museum sites across London were balloted for strike action. The unions' demands included making V&A an accredited Living Wage employer, access to water during heatwaves and toilet breaks for Storehouse staff. Representatives from the unions asked Hunt to attend negotiations facilitated by the Advisory, Conciliation and Arbitration Service (Acas) but claim that he refused to do so. Union sources would characterise his absence from these talks as "shocking" and "disrespectful".

== Personal life ==
Hunt is married to Juliet Thornback with whom he has one son and two daughters; they live in London.

== Honours and recognition ==
Hunt is a Fellow of the Royal Historical Society (FRHistS). He was knighted in the 2026 New Year Honours for services to Museums.

== Bibliography ==
- The English Civil War: At First Hand (2002, Weidenfeld & Nicolson, ISBN 029782953X)
- Building Jerusalem (2004, Weidenfeld & Nicolson, ISBN 0297607677)
- The Ragged Trousered Philanthropists by Robert Tressell (Introduction by Tristram Hunt) (2004, Penguin Modern Classics, ISBN 0141187697)
- The Frock-Coated Communist: The Revolutionary Life of Friedrich Engels (2009, ISBN 0713998520) (US title: Marx's General: The Revolutionary Life of Friedrich Engels, ISBN 9780805080254)
- The Origin of the Family, Private Property and the State by Friedrich Engels (Introduction by Tristam Hunt) (2010, Penguin Modern Classics, ISBN 9780141191119)
- Ten Cities That Made an Empire (2014) (US title: Cities of Empire: The British Colonies and the Creation of the Urban World, Metropolitan Books, ISBN 9780805093087)
- The Radical Potter: The Life and Times of Josiah Wedgwood (2021, Macmillan, ISBN 9781250128348)

Parliament of the United Kingdom
| Preceded by Mark Fisher | Member of Parliament for Stoke-on-Trent Central; 2010–2017 | Succeeded by Gareth Snell |
Political offices
| Preceded by Stephen Twigg | Shadow Secretary of State for Education; 2013–2015 | Succeeded by Lucy Powell |
Cultural offices
| Preceded by Martin Roth | Director of the Victoria and Albert Museum; 2017–present | Incumbent |
