= Viscount Soulbury =

Viscountcy in the Peerage of the United Kingdom

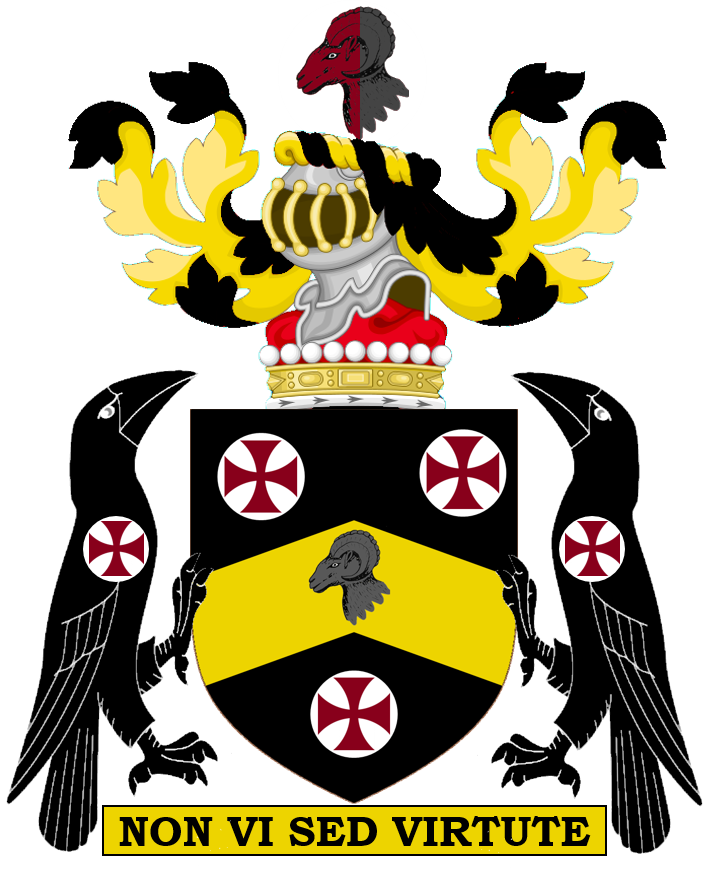
The arms of the Viscounts Soulbury

Viscount Soulbury, of Soulbury in the County of Buckingham, is a title in the Peerage of the United Kingdom. It was created on 16 July 1954 for the Conservative politician Herwald Ramsbotham, 1st Baron Soulbury at the end of his term as Governor-General of Ceylon. He was son of Herwald, son of James and brother of Rev Alexander Ramsbotham. He had already been created Baron Soulbury, of Soulbury in the County of Buckingham, on 6 August 1941, also in the Peerage of the United Kingdom. He was succeeded by his elder son, James, the second Viscount, who lived most of his life in Sri Lanka and gave his maiden speech 13 December 1984. The second Viscount was succeeded by his younger brother, Peter. Better known as Sir Peter Ramsbotham, he was a distinguished diplomat and notably served as British Ambassador to the United States between 1974 and 1977. Sir Peter's son, Oliver, fourth Viscount, succeeded in 2010.

== Viscounts Soulbury (1954) ==
- Herwald Ramsbotham, 1st Viscount Soulbury (1887–1971)
- James Herwald Ramsbotham, 2nd Viscount Soulbury (1915–2004)
- Peter Edward Ramsbotham, 3rd Viscount Soulbury (1919–2010). He did not use the title.
- Professor Oliver Peter Ramsbotham, 4th Viscount Soulbury (b. 1943). He does not use the title.

The heir apparent is the present holder's son, the Hon. (Edward) Herwald Ramsbotham (b. 1966).

== Line of Succession ==
- Herwald Ramsbotham, 1st Viscount Soulbury (1887 - 1971)
  - James Herwald Ramsbotham, 2nd Viscount Soulbury (1915 - 2004)
  - Peter Edward Ramsbotham, 3rd Viscount Soulbury (1919 - 2010)
    - Oliver Peter Ramsbotham, 4th Viscount Soulbury (born 1943)
      - (1) Hon. Edward Herwald Ramsbotham (b. 1966)
      - (2) Hon. Benedict Oliver David Ramsbotham (b. 1967)
      - (3) Hon. Alexander Meredith Ramsbotham (b. 1969)
    - (4) Hon. Simon Edward Ramsbotham (b. 1949)
      - (5) David James Peter Ramsbotham (b. 1981)
