= Norman Costar =

British diplomat (1909–1995)

Sir Norman Costar KCMG

British High Commissioner to Cyprus
- In office 1967–1969
- Preceded by: Sir David Hunt
- Succeeded by: Peter Ramsbotham

British High Commissioner to Trinidad and Tobago
- In office 1962–1966
- Preceded by: Post established
- Succeeded by: Sir Peter Hampshire

Personal details
- Born: 18 May 1909
- Died: 5 July 1995 (aged 86)
- Education: Jesus College, Cambridge
- Occupation: Diplomat

Sir Norman Edgar Costar (18 May 1909 – 5 July 1995) was a British diplomat. He served as High Commissioner to Trinidad and Tobago from 1962 to 1966 and High Commissioner to Cyprus from 1967 to 1969.

== Early life and education ==
Costar was born on 18 May 1909 in London, the son of E. T. Costar. He was educated at Battersea Grammar School where he won a scholarship to Jesus College, Cambridge.

== Career ==
Costar entered the Colonial Office in 1932, and was appointed assistant principal in the Colonial Office, serving until 1935 when he became private secretary to the Permanent Under-Secretary at the Dominions Office. He then served at the British High Commissions in Australia from 1937 to 1939, and, after World War II, in New Zealand from 1945 to 1947. He then served as Deputy High Commissioner in Ceylon from 1953 to 1957, attending the Colombo foreign ministers meeting which led to the establishment of the Colombo Plan. After a two year spell at the Commonwealth Relations Office as assistant Under-Secretary in the economic division, he served as deputy High Commissioner in Australia from 1960 to 1962.

Costar then served as British High Commissioner to Trinidad and Tobago at Port of Spain from 1962 to 1966, the first British envoy after independence, and then British High Commissioner to Cyprus from 1967 to 1969.

After retiring from the diplomatic service, Costar sat on the panel of adjudicators hearing immigration appeals from 1970 to 1981.

== Personal life and death ==
Costar never married. He died on 5 July 1995, aged 86.

== Honours ==
Costar was appointed Companion of the Order of St Michael and St George (CMG) in the 1953 New Year Honours, and promoted to Knight Commander (KCMG) in the 1963 New Year Honours.

== See also ==
- Cyprus–United Kingdom relations
- Trinidad and Tobago–United Kingdom relations

Diplomatic posts
Preceded by New office	British High Commissioner to Trinidad and Tobago; 1962–1966	Succeeded by Sir Peter Hampshire
Preceded by Sir David Hunt	British High Commissioner to Cyprus; 1967–1969	Succeeded by Peter Ramsbotham
