= Julian Hunt, Baron Hunt of Chesterton =

British meteorologist (1941–2026)

The Right Honourable The Lord Hunt of Chesterton CB FRS
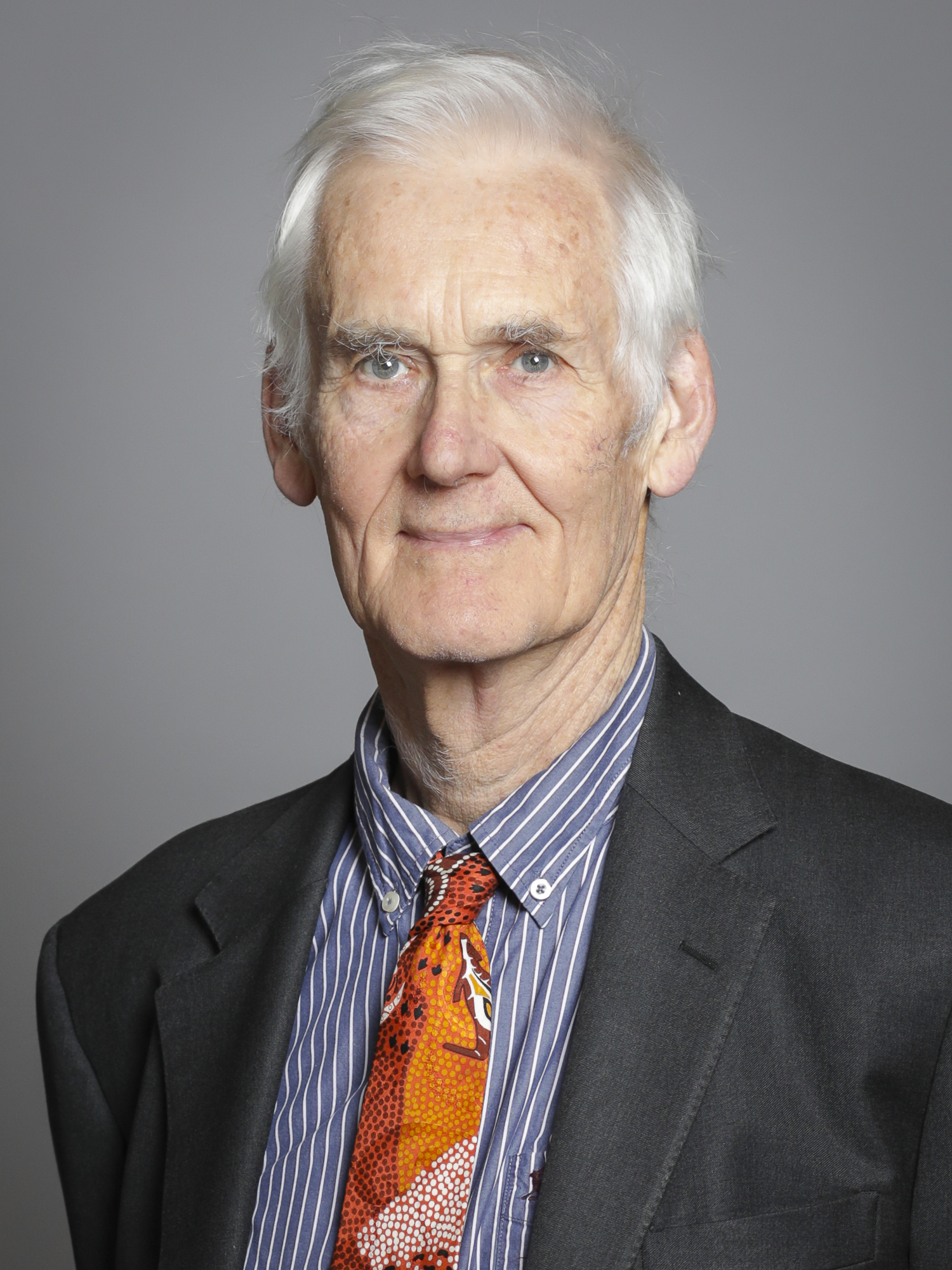
- Official portrait, 2019

Member of the House of Lords
- Lord Temporal
- Life peerage 5 May 2000 – 30 October 2021

Personal details
- Born: 5 September 1941 Ootacamund, Madras Province, British India
- Died: 20 April 2026 (aged 84)
- Party: Labour
- Children: Jemima Hunt; Tristram Hunt
- Parent: Roland Hunt (father)
- Education: Westminster School; Trinity College, Cambridge

Julian Charles Roland Hunt, Baron Hunt of Chesterton, CB, FRS (5 September 1941 – 20 April 2026) was a British meteorologist who was the Director General and Chief Executive of the British Meteorological Office from 1992 to 1997. He was made a Life peer of the Labour Party by Tony Blair in 2000 where he sat until 30 October 2021. He was the leader on the Labour group of Cambridge City Council in the 1970s.

== Early life and education ==
Julian Charles Roland Hunt was born in Ootacamund, a hill station in Madras Province, British India, on 5 September 1941. His father was Roland Hunt, later a diplomat but then a magistrate in the Indian Civil Service, and Pauline Hunt (daughter of Maxwell Garnett). He spent his school holidays living with various family members: meteorologist Lewis Fry Richardson was married to his great-aunt Dorothy and was an influence on the young Hunt in matters of academia; and Douglas Jay, a Labour minister, who was married to Pauline Hunt's sister, was influential in matters of politics. His grandfather Maxwell Garnett was an expert on the physics of colour when a fellow at Trinity College Cambridge, following Hunt’s great grandfather William Garnett who worked with James Clerk Maxwell in the early years of the Cavendish Laboratory in Cambridge. The Hunt family were goldsmiths and silversmiths in the eighteenth and nineteenth centuries; John Samuel Hunt (1785–1865) being in business with his uncle-by-marriage, Paul Storr; also descended from John Samuel Hunt was John Hunt, Baron Hunt of Fawley. His family returned to the United Kingdom from India following the end of the Second World War.

Hunt was educated at the Dragon School, then an all-boys independent prep school, and at Westminster School, then an all-boys public school in London. He studied mechanical sciences at Trinity College, Cambridge, and graduated from the University of Cambridge in 1963 with a first class honours Bachelor of Arts (BA) degree. He remained at Cambridge to undertake postgraduate research under Arthur Shercliff, and completed his Doctor of Philosophy (PhD) degree in 1967. His doctoral thesis was titled "Some aspects of magnetohydrodynamics".

== Career ==
=== Academic career ===
In 1966, Hunt was elected a fellow of Trinity College, Cambridge. He undertook post-doctoral research as a Fulbright Scholar at Cornell University in 1967. From 1968 to 1970, seeking "real world" experience, he was a research officer with the Central Electricity Generating Board (CEGB).

He returned to Cambridge in 1970, having remained a fellow throughout the interlude, and was made a university lecturer in applied mathematics and engineering. He was appointed Reader in Fluid Mechanics in 1978 and made Professor of Fluid Dynamics in 1990. He held numerous visiting professorships, and was also a visiting scholar at the United States Environmental Protection Agency in 1977 and the National Center for Atmospheric Research, Boulder, Colorado in 1983. These reflected his increasing interest in the environment and pollutants. From 1992, while director general of the Meteorological Office, he was an honorary professor at Cambridge.

He left the Met Office in 1997, to return to academia, becoming Professor of Climate modelling in the Department of Space and Climate Physics and Department of Earth Sciences at University College London. He was also honorary director of UCL's Lighthill Institute of Mathematical Sciences from 2003 to 2006. He retired from UCL in 2008, and was made an emeritus professor.

In 1989, he was elected a Fellow of the Royal Society (FRS).

=== Meteorological Office ===
Hunt followed Sir John Houghton as Director-General and Chief Executive of the Meteorological Office in 1992, consequently being elected to the Executive Committee of the World Meteorological Organisation. In 1997 he left the Met Office and was replaced by Peter Ewins.

In later years he warned that the pattern of Asian monsoons could be fundamentally altered unless there is a concerted effort to check greenhouse gas emissions. He was chairman of Cambridge Environmental Research Consultants Ltd.

=== Politics ===
While in the United States as postgraduate researcher, Hunt and his wife became interested in the anti-Vietnam War movement and took part in the October 1967 March on the Pentagon. When back in England, he joined the Labour Party, considering himself on the right of the party.

Hunt served as an elected councillor on Cambridge City Council between 1971 and 1974. He also served as leader of the council's Labour Party Group in 1972.

He was created a life peer as Baron Hunt of Chesterton, Chesterton in the County of Cambridgeshire on 5 May 2000. He made his maiden speech in the House of Lords on 7 June 2000 during a debate on coastal erosion.

== Personal life ==
In 1965, he married Marylla Shephard, daughter of the painter and art teacher Rupert Shephard and later stepdaughter to Nicolette Devas, author of Two Flamboyant Fathers. Together they had three children: novelist Jemima; medical doctor Matilda; and historian, director of the Victoria & Albert Museum group and former Member of Parliament, Sir Tristram Hunt.

Hunt died from complications of vascular dementia on 20 April 2026, at the age of 84.
