= Richard Alvin Neilson =

British diplomat

Richard Alvin Neilson CMG LVO (9 July 1937 – 6 June 1997) was a British diplomat who was Ambassador to Colombia and Chile, and High Commissioner to Trinidad and Tobago.

== Biography ==
Neilson's childhood was spent in the north-west of England and he returned to the family origins the Isle of Man during the Second World War living in Kirk Michael.

After winning a County Scholarship from Burnley Grammar School, Neilson received a 1st Class degree in Geography and then a master's degree (his thesis being on the formation of the Dartmoor tors) from Leeds University before winning a Fulbright scholarship to Wisconsin University. He returned becoming an academic at Edinburgh University. From Edinburgh he joined the Foreign Office serving in Congo, Chile (twice), Australia, Northern Ireland, Zambia and Gibraltar (as Deputy Governor). He was Ambassador to Colombia 1987–1990, Ambassador to Chile 1990–1993 and High Commissioner to Trinidad and Tobago 1994–1996.

Neilson was appointed MVO Fourth Class (which became LVO in 1985) on the occasion of the Queen's state visit to Chile in 1968, and CMG in 1987.

Neilson was survived by his wife Olive and son Paul.
