= Yin Xin (painter) =

Xin Yin (1959) is a painter of Chinese origin, residing in Paris and known for orientalizing traditional western images. Yin was born in Kashgar.

Yin incorporates his passion for China and its people in his work by orientalizing traditional western images and techniques. His work has been on display at the Victoria and Albert Museum, Staatliche Museen, Shanghai Art Museum, Musee Courbet, Museo Nacional del Grabado and on permanent display in the Notre Dame Cathedral in Paris.

Martin Roth, director of the Victoria and Albert Museum, described Xin's work as combining Western and Eastern elements to stress how the observer's perception of artistic value is determined by his or her cultural context.

== Education ==
By his late teens, he went to the Xinjiang Normal University of Fine Arts, where he taught for two years after earning his degree. He then studied printmaking at the Xi'an Academy of Fine Arts, before finishing his studies at the Royal Melbourne Institute of Art. After graduating in 1991, Yin traveled from Australia to Europe to start solo exhibitions in Paris, Taiwan, Hong Kong, Tokyo, London and New York, before moving to Paris indefinitely.

== Orientalizing ==
Yin is known for using Western oil painting techniques to express a certain oriental nostalgia in the era of European colonialism. His “Once Upon a Time in China” series presents a juxtaposition between Chinese high society and Paris' Belle Epoque Era. These works in particular, bear traces of the mottled texture of ancient murals, reminiscent of the famous 17th century French painter Georges de La Tour.

Yin Orientalized Western paintings with his "after the master" series. One of these parodies was his recreation Botticelli's Venus, "Venus of the Orient", which participated in the Berlin National Gallery's 2015 exhibition. It was then featured in the Victoria and Albert Museum's 2016 exhibition of Botticelli in London. In addition to these series, Yin's Metamorphosis project renovates original 18th and 19th century European oil paintings through the addition of Chinese subjects and elements.

== Selected works ==
Yin's paintings Madonna and Son, Portrait of Martyr Chan Chang Pin and a pair of Chinese couplets are, since 2017, on permanent display the Notre Dame de Paris Cathedral.

Recent exhibitions include:

- 2018 - Notre Dame Cathedral in Paris
- 2017 - Private View, Tanya Baxter Contemporary, Hong Kong; Lunar New Year Exhibition, Tanya Baxter Contemporary, London
- 2016 - Botticelli Reimagined, Victoria and Albert Museum, London
