= Jemima Hunt =

British journalist and novelist (born 1969)

The Honourable Jemima Hunt (born 1969) is a British journalist and novelist who has written for Esquire, The Guardian and The Evening Standard amongst other publications.

She is the author of the books The Late Arrival and Notes from Utopia. She has also ghost written the autobiography of Charlotte Church, Voice of an Angel.

She is the daughter of the Labour life peer, Julian Hunt and the sister of historian and former Labour Party Member of Parliament for Stoke-on-Trent Central, Tristram Hunt.
