= James Ramsbotham, 2nd Viscount Soulbury =

James Herwald Ramsbotham, 2nd Viscount Soulbury (21 March 1915 – 12 December 2004) was the elder son of the Rt Hon Herwald Ramsbotham, 1st Viscount Soulbury, British Conservative politician.

== Army and marriage ==
At the outbreak of World War II he signed up with the REME, rapidly mastering the professional techniques, meanwhile continuing his work with groups in England. He married Anthea Margaret Wilton on 5 April 1949 (she died 26 June 1950).

== Life in Sri Lanka ==
From the late 1950s he lived in Ceylon (Sri Lanka), where his father had been Governor-General, as a Hindu yogi under the name Santhaswami. Although he ran the Sivathondan Nilayam at Chenkalady in Batticaloa, he also spent much time amongst the Veddas, aboriginal tribal peoples. He used to go off for long periods to their strongholds deep in the jungles and forests. Inevitably one newspaper or another would "scoop" the story of his death. He would subsequently emerge again from one of these forays, wondering what all the fuss was about. He then moved to Kaithadi Ashram at Jaffna, where he lived until 1986.

== Publications ==
- Yoga Swami: The Sage of Lanka

== Arms ==
Coat of arms of James Ramsbotham, 2nd Viscount Soulbury
Crest A Plate charged with a Ram's Head erased per pale Gules and Sable Escutcheon Sable on a Chevron Or between three Plates each charged with a Cross Patty Gules a Ram's Head erased of the first Supporters On either side a Raven proper charged with a Plate thereon a Cross Patty Gules Motto Non Vi Sed Virtute (Not by force but by virtue)

Peerage of the United Kingdom
Preceded by Herwald Ramsbotham	Viscount Soulbury; 1971–2004	Succeeded by Peter Edward Ramsbotham
