= Martin Berthoud =

British diplomat (1931–2022)

Sir Martin Seymour Berthoud, KCVO, CMG (20 August 1931 – 20 January 2022) was a British diplomat.

== Life and career ==
Berthoud was born on 20 August 1931, the son of the diplomat Sir Eric Berthoud. He attended Magdalen College, Oxford, before entering HM Diplomatic Service. Between 1979 and 1981, he was Head of the North American Department at the Foreign and Commonwealth Office; he then spent three years as Consul-General in Sydney before serving as the United Kingdom's High Commissioner to Trinidad and Tobago between 1985 and 1991.

Berthoud was appointed a Companion of the Most Distinguished Order of St Michael and St George in the 1985 Birthday Honours and a Knight Commander of the Royal Victorian Order in November that year, on the occasion of Elizabeth II's visit to the Caribbean. He was also appointed a Commander of the Finnish Order of the Lion of Finland in 1976.

Berthoud died on 20 January 2022, at the age of 90.

== Publications ==
- Undiplomatic episodes (Autobiography). Kibworth Beauchamp: Matador. 2016. ISBN 978-1785893-858.
