= Apocalypse 2000 =

1987 novel

Apocalypse 2000: Economic Breakdown and the Suicide of Democracy, 1989-2000
- Author: Peter Jay and Michael Stewart
- Genre: Future history novel
- Publisher: Prentice Hall Press
- Publication date: 1987
- Publication place: United Kingdom
- ISBN: 0130434310

Apocalypse 2000: Economic Breakdown and the Suicide of Democracy (also known as Apocalypse 2000: Economic Breakdown and the Suicide of Democracy, 1989-2000 or Apocalypse 2000) is a 1987 novel by English economists Peter Jay and Michael Stewart.

In the novel, trade imbalances, entrenched unemployment in Europe, pervasive inequality in the United States, and a massive default by Latin American countries creates economic and political upheaval, which Western leaders are shown incapable of addressing. A former televangelist becomes the US president in 1993 and brings in stark and disruptive economic policies. The US military withdraws from Europe and instead is redeployed to Asia to fight a civil war in the Philippines, as well as to combat drug smuggling at home.

The following year in Europe, a populist personality named Olaf D. Le Rith (an anagram of Adolf Hitler) leads his Europe First Movement (EFM) to victory in European Parliament elections. He runs on an anti-American, anti-immigration and protectionist platform, and as argued in his book Europe First, he considers European integration and a Pan-European identity as necessary to solve Europe's problems. Le Rith then forces European countries to cede sovereignty to the European Economic Community which he now controls.

Come 2000, the US has an unofficial unemployment rate in excess of 20%, and a level of violence akin to Lebanon or South Africa of the 1980s. In Europe, where the EFM rules with an iron fist, unemployment and inflation had largely been eliminated from the continent, but the over-centralised European economy was plagued with shortages and inefficiencies. Both the US and Europe have erected massive trade barriers, which undermines Japan's export-orientated economy and ultimately social fabric.

The novel, written in 1987, assumed the Soviet Union and East Germany would still be in existence, that apartheid in South Africa would end violently, and that India would be teetering on breaking up.

== Reviews ==
Reviewing the book in the London Review of Books, R. W. Johnson criticised some of its prognostications. The US deficit in the 1980s, while large, constituted only a tiny faction of US GNP. The authors ignored the possibilities that a deficit could be managed by currency devaluations, or that there were US interest groups with sufficient political heft to prevent a slide to protectionism.
