= List of high commissioners of the United Kingdom to Trinidad and Tobago =

His Majesty's High Commissioner to the Republic of Trinidad and Tobago
- Coat of arms of the United Kingdom
- Style: Her Excellency
- Residence: St Clair Avenue in Port of Spain
- Inaugural holder: Sir Norman Costar; First high commissioner to Trinidad and Tobago
- Formation: 1964
- Website: www.gov.uk/government/world/trinidad-and-tobago

The high commissioner of the United Kingdom to Trinidad and Tobago is the United Kingdom's foremost diplomatic representative in the Republic of Trinidad and Tobago.

Countries belonging to the Commonwealth of Nations exchange high commissioners rather than ambassadors. Though there are a few technical differences (for instance, whereas ambassadors present their diplomatic credentials to the host country's head of state, high commissioners are accredited to the head of government), in practice they have the same function.

Trinidad and Tobago were British colonies from 1802 to 1964, when the combined country gained independence from Britain and joined the Commonwealth.

From 1974 until 1980, the British high commissioner to Trinidad and Tobago also served as non-resident high commissioner to Grenada.

== List of heads of mission ==
=== High commissioners ===
==== Trinidad and Tobago ====
- Sir Norman E. Costar, 1962–1966
- Sir G. Peter Hampshire, 1966–1970
- Roland Hunt, 1970–1973
- Christopher E. Diggines, 1973–1974

==== Trinidad and Tobago and Grenada ====
- Christopher E. Diggines, 1974–1977
- Henry S.H.C. Stanley, 1977–1980

==== Trinidad and Tobago ====
- David N. Lane, 1980–1985
- Sir Martin S. Berthoud, 1985–1991
- Brian Smith, 1991–1994
- Richard A. Neilson, 1994–1996
- L. Gregory Faulkner, 1996–1999
- Peter G. Harborne, 1999–2004
- Ronald P. Nash, 2004–2007
- Eric Jenkinson, 2007–2011
- Arthur Snell, 2011–2014
- Charles Moore (chargé d'affaires), 2014–2015
- Tim Stew, 2015-2020
- Harriet Cross, September 2020-January 2025
- Jon Dean, January 2025-present
