= George Francis Abercrombie =

British physician

George Francis Abercrombie VRD, MA, MD, HON. FRCGP
- Surgeon-Captain George Abercrombie
- Born: 25 June 1896
- Died: 25 September 1978 (aged 82)
- Education: Charterhouse School; Gonville and Caius College, Cambridge; Medical College of St Bartholomew's Hospital
- Occupation: General Practitioner
- Known for: Co-founding RCGP

George Francis Abercrombie, VRD, FRCGP (25 June 1896 – 25 September 1978) was a British physician who worked as a general practitioner (GP). In 1952, he co-founded the College of General Practitioners, later granted the royal prefix and renamed the Royal College of General Practitioners (RCGP). He became its president in 1967.

In 1950, he was elected the first president of the section of general practice of the Royal Society of Medicine (RSM) and later became a fellow. He was also at this time, appointed honorary physician to King George VI.

== Early life ==
George Abercrombie was born in 1896, the son of a solicitor. He enrolled in the Royal Navy at the onset of the World War I and despite being a medical student with only three months clinical experience, he assisted in numerous destroyers over a period of 10 months. He was affiliated to the London Division of the Royal Naval Reserve (RNVR), maintaining his interest in the navy throughout his life and eventually becoming surgeon captain.

== Medicine ==
On returning from the war, Abercrombie studied at Gonville and Caius College, Cambridge, and completed a bachelor's degree before qualifying in medicine from St Bartholomew's Medical College. He spent most of his medical career in general practice in Hampstead and had a particular interest in obstetrics, assisting in St Bartholomew's antenatal department.

He was president of the Hampstead medical society, chairman of the emergency bed service and a significant role in the King's Fund. In addition, he was co-editor of The British Encyclopaedia of General Practice. In 1950, he was appointed honorary physician to King George VI.

=== Section of general practice at Royal Society of Medicine ===
Abercrombie was elected as the first president of the section of general practice, established 1950. He gave the presidential address on "The Occasional Obstetrician", and contributed significantly to its success. A number of his colleagues in the council, including John Hunt, Baron Hunt of Fawley, eventually became involved in the founding of the RCGP. The RSM later awarded him an honorary fellowship.

=== RCGP ===
Initially apprehensive, following discussion with the executive of the RSM, Abercrombie at first turned down John Hunt's request for support in the formation of a college. He very soon changed his mind and became a member of the steering group, which founded the RCGP. He was appointed first chairman of the provisional foundation council on 19 November 1952 and his mother, Mrs G.K. Abercrombie, gave a significant donation. He subsequently became chairman of the full foundation council and of the first three councils of the college between 1953 and 1956. He was president of the college between 1959 and 1962. During that time he played a chief part in acquiring the Princess Gate building, the president's chain of office and the college's coat of arms. The RCGP's motto was initiated by Abercrombie.

== Family and personal ==
Abercrombie married Maria. His hobbies included mountain climbing and he was a member of the Alpine Club. He was a strong chess player and once won against world chess champion José Raúl Capablanca. As a member of the Sherlock Holmes Society, he published an article about Dr Watson. He retired in 1966.

== Death and legacy ==
Abercrombie died in 1978. The George Abercrombie Award is given for the most commendable literary work in general practice by a fellow, member or associate of the RCGP.
