= Gareth Stedman Jones =

English academic and historian (born 1942)

Gareth Stedman Jones FBA
- Born: 17 December 1942 (age 83)
- Occupations: Professor; Historian

Academic background
- Education: St Paul's School; Lincoln College, Oxford (MA); Nuffield College, Oxford (DPhil)

Academic work
- Discipline: History
- Institutions: Queen Mary, University of London
- Doctoral students: Tristram Hunt
- Main interests: History of Ideas

Gareth Stedman Jones FBA (born 17 December 1942) is an English academic and historian. As Professor of the History of Ideas at Queen Mary, University of London, he deals particularly with working-class history and Marxism.

== Career ==
Educated at St Paul's School and Lincoln College, Oxford, where he graduated in history in 1964, Stedman Jones went on to Nuffield College, Oxford to take a DPhil in 1970.

He moved to Cambridge in 1974, becoming a fellow of King's College, Cambridge, and in 1979, a lecturer in history. He was a research fellow at Nuffield College, Oxford, from 1967 to 1970, a senior associate member of St Antony's College, Oxford, in 1971–1972, and an Alexander von Humboldt Stiftung Fellow, Department of Philosophy, Goethe University, Frankfurt in 1973–1974, before becoming a lecturer in history at Cambridge in 1979–1986 and a reader in history of social thought there in 1986–1997. He has served as co-director of the Centre for History and Economics at King's since 1991 and held the post of professor of political science from 1997 to 2010. In 2010 Stedman Jones became Professor of the History of Ideas at Queen Mary, University of London.

From 1964 to 1981 Stedman Jones served on the editorial board of the New Left Review. He was a joint founder of the History Workshop Journal in 1976.

== Political views ==
Jones's political position has evolved from his early affiliation with the New Left Review to a more complex stance, characterized by a focus on Republicanism, social democracy, and Inclusive citizenship, which he advocates as an alternative to the politics of laissez-faire and socialist extremes. He argues for a socially minded republicanism to overcome the inherent conflict between free-market economics and socialist ideals, emphasising a model of gradual, democratic change over revolutionary upheaval.

In 2018, reviewing Stedman Jones's intellectual evolution, historian Terence Renaud described a "journey from the New Left, through French structuralism, to a contextualist practice of intellectual history that leaves Marxism behind."

== Publications ==
- Outcast London, Oxford, 1971, reprinted 1984 (with new preface), 1992 and 2002
- Languages of Class: Studies in English Working Class History, 1832–1982, Cambridge, 1983
- Klassen, Politik, Sprache, edited by {Peter Schöttler}, Munster, 1988
- Karl Marx and Friedrich Engels, The Communist Manifesto, Harmondsworth, 2002: introduction of 180 pp.
- An End to Poverty? London, Profile Books, July 2004
- Karl Marx: Greatness and Illusion, published by Allan Lane, August 2016
