= List of high commissioners of the United Kingdom to Uganda =

The high commissioner of the United Kingdom to Uganda is the United Kingdom's foremost diplomatic representative in the Republic of Uganda, and head of the UK's diplomatic mission in Uganda.

They work primarily from the British High Commission Kampala.

As fellow members of the Commonwealth of Nations, the United Kingdom and Uganda conduct their diplomatic relations at governmental level, rather than between heads of state. Therefore, the countries exchange high commissioners, rather than ambassadors.

== High commissioners to Uganda ==
- 1962–1965: David Hunt
- 1965–1967: Roland Hunt
- 1967–1970: David Scott
- 1970–1972: Richard Slater
- 1972–1973: Henry Brind
- 1973–1976: James Hennessy
- 1976–1979: (no high commissioner)
- 1979: Richard Posnett
- 1979–1980: Bertram Flack
- 1980–1983: Norman Hillier-Fry
- 1983–1986: Colin McLean
- 1986–1989: Derek March
- 1989–1993: Charles Cullimore
- 1993–1997: Edward Clay
- 1997–2000: Michael Cook
- 2000–2002: Tom Phillips
- 2002–2005: Adam Wood
- 2005–2008: Francois Gordon
- 2008–2012: Martin Shearman
- 2012–2016: Alison Blackburne
- 2016–2020 Peter West
- 2020-2025: Kate Airey
- 2024-present: Lisa Chesney
