= Anthony Parsons =

British diplomat

Sir Anthony Parsons GCMG LVO MC
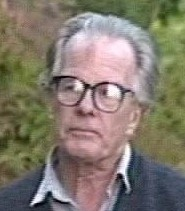

British Ambassador to Iran
- In office 1974–1979
- Monarch: Elizabeth II
- Prime Minister: Harold Wilson; James Callaghan; Margaret Thatcher
- Preceded by: Peter Ramsbotham
- Succeeded by: Sir John Graham, 4th Baronet

UK Permanent Representative to the United Nations
- In office 1979–1982
- Monarch: Elizabeth II
- Prime Minister: Margaret Thatcher
- Preceded by: Ivor Richard
- Succeeded by: John Thomson (diplomat)

Personal details
- Born: 9 September 1922
- Died: 12 August 1996 (aged 73)
- Education: Balliol College, Oxford
- Occupation: Diplomat

Sir Anthony Derrick Parsons GCMG LVO MC (9 September 1922 – 12 August 1996) was a British diplomat, ambassador to Iran at the time of the Iranian Revolution, and Permanent Representative to the UN at the time of the Falklands War. Known for his intelligence, wit, and skillful diplomacy, Parsons played a key role in high-profile international crises and was also a respected Arabist and academic.

== Career ==
Anthony Parsons was educated at King's School, Canterbury, and Balliol College, Oxford, where he studied Arabic and Turkish, graduating with First Class honours. He served as an artillery officer during the Second World War and was awarded the Military Cross in August 1945. He remained in the army to serve as Assistant Military Attaché in Baghdad from 1952 to 1954.

Parsons joined the Foreign Office in 1954 and held postings in Ankara, Amman, Cairo, Khartoum, and Bahrain (as Political Agent, 1965–69). He was Counsellor at the UK Mission to the United Nations in New York City from 1969 to 1971, and Under-Secretary at the Foreign and Commonwealth Office from 1971 to 1974.

From 1974 to 1979, Parsons served as British Ambassador to Iran. During this time, he misjudged the stability of the Shah's regime prior to the 1979 revolution, a miscalculation he later reflected on critically in his book The Pride and the Fall: Iran 1974–1979. He was known for his deep understanding of Iranian society and the Arab world, his linguistic skills in Arabic, Turkish, and Persian, and his ability to cultivate trust with foreign leaders. Parsons was noted for arranging informal diplomacy, such as assisting journalists in Tehran and facilitating dialogue with Soviet diplomats in New York.

In 1979, he became UK Permanent Representative to the United Nations. During the Falklands War in 1982, Parsons was instrumental in securing United Nations Security Council Resolution 502, which demanded an immediate cessation of hostilities and withdrawal of Argentine forces. His diplomatic skill and public presence, including television appearances during UN meetings, earned him recognition as a persuasive and effective representative. He was known for maintaining frank, witty, and personable interactions with colleagues, world leaders, and adversaries alike.

After retiring from the Diplomatic Service in 1982, Parsons served as a part-time special adviser on foreign affairs to Prime Minister Margaret Thatcher (1982–83). Thatcher later described him as a man of intelligence, toughness, style, and elegance, and admired his willingness to speak candidly, even in disagreement. Parsons also served on the board of the British Council from 1982 to 1986.

In 1984, he became a research fellow and lecturer at the University of Exeter, focusing on Arab Gulf studies. He published two more books on international affairs: They Say the Lion (1986) and From Cold War to Hot Peace: UN Interventions 1947–1994 (1995), and frequently contributed to broadcasting organizations and public lectures.

== Personal life ==
Parsons married Sheila Baird in 1948 and had two sons and two daughters. Tragically, both sons predeceased him, a personal loss from which he never fully recovered. Colleagues described him as having a warm and engaging personality that contrasted with his sometimes stern public demeanor. He was known for his sense of humor, courage, and devotion to family, as well as a lifelong interest in literature, particularly Conrad, Wodehouse, and Beowulf. Parsons died of cancer at his home in Ashburton, Devon, on 12 August 1996, aged 73.

== Honours ==
=== National ===
Military Cross (1945)
Royal Victorian Order (1965)
Order of St Michael and St George (CMG 1969, KCMG 1975, GCMG 1982)

== In popular culture ==
In 1995, Sir Anthony Parsons wrote the foreword to Century Story, the autobiography of his cousin Claudia Parsons, the first woman to circumnavigate the globe by car.

Sir Anthony Parsons was portrayed by Robert Hardy in The Falklands Play (2002).

== Publications ==
- The Pride and the Fall: Iran 1974–1979; Jonathan Cape, London, 1984. ISBN 0224021966
- Vultures and Philistines: British Attitudes to Culture and Cultural Diplomacy, British Council 50th anniversary lecture, in International Affairs vol.61, no.1, Blackwell, 1984
- They Say the Lion: Britain's legacy to the Arabs: a personal memoir; Jonathan Cape, London, 1986. ISBN 0224028294
- The United Nations and the quest for peace (with Professor Alan James), special paper no.11, Welsh Centre for International Affairs, 1986.
- Antarctica : the next decade (ed.); report of a group study chaired by Sir Anthony Parsons, Cambridge University Press, 1987. ISBN 0521331811
- Iran and Western Europe; Anthony Parsons, in Middle East Journal vol.43, no.2, 1989
- The Saddamic verses: a personal sketch in verse and prose of the Iraqi conflict from August 1990 by Charmian Steele, introduction by Sir Anthony Parsons, illustrated exclusively by the work of photographers for The Independent; Charmian Steele, UK, 1991. ISBN 0951852205
- Peace in the Middle East? (introduction); The Oxford International Review (special issue), 1992. ISSN 0966-0054
- Terrorism and democracy: some contemporary cases, report of a study group of the David Davies Memorial Institute of International Studies, ed. Peter Janke, introduction by Sir Anthony Parsons; Macmillan in association with the David Davies Memorial Institute of International Studies, London, 1992. ISBN 0333554884
- The United Nations in the Post-Cold War Era in International Relations, December 1992, vol.11 no.3, pp189–200
- Central Asia, the last decolonisation, David Davies Memorial Institute of International Studies, Occasional paper no.4, London 1993
- The Security Council : an uncertain future, David Davies Memorial Institute of International Studies, Occasional paper no.8, London, 1994. ISSN 1353-9884
- Human rights and civil conflict in the post-imperial world (Eileen Illtyd David memorial lecture, 1993); University College of Swansea, 1994. ISBN 0860761002
- From Cold War to Hot Peace: UN interventions 1947–1994; Michael Joseph, London, 1995. ISBN 0718138287

== Sources ==
- PARSONS, Sir Anthony (Derrick), Who Was Who, A & C Black, 1920–2008; online edn, Oxford University Press, Dec 2007, accessed 10 March 2012
- Parsons, Sir Anthony Derrick (1922–1996) by Glencairn Balfour-Paul, Oxford Dictionary of National Biography, Oxford University Press, 2004
- Obituary: Sir Anthony Parsons, The Independent, London, 14 August 1996
- Sir Anthony Parsons, British Diplomat, Is Dead at 73, Obituary, New York Times, 14 August 1996
- Parsons, Sir Anthony Derrick, Transcript of interview, British Diplomatic Oral History Programme, Churchill College, Cambridge, 1996
- Sir Anthony Parsons, The Herald, 15 August 1996
- SIR ANTHONY PARSONS, 73, DIPLOMAT, South Florida Sun Sentinel, 24 September 2021

== Offices held ==
Diplomatic posts
Preceded by Sir Peter Ramsbotham	Ambassador to Iran; 1974–1979	Succeeded by Sir John Graham
Preceded by Ivor Richard	UK Permanent Representative to the United Nations; 1979–1982	Succeeded by Sir John Thomson
