= David Hunt (diplomat) =

British diplomat (1913–1998)

Sir David Hunt KCMG OBE
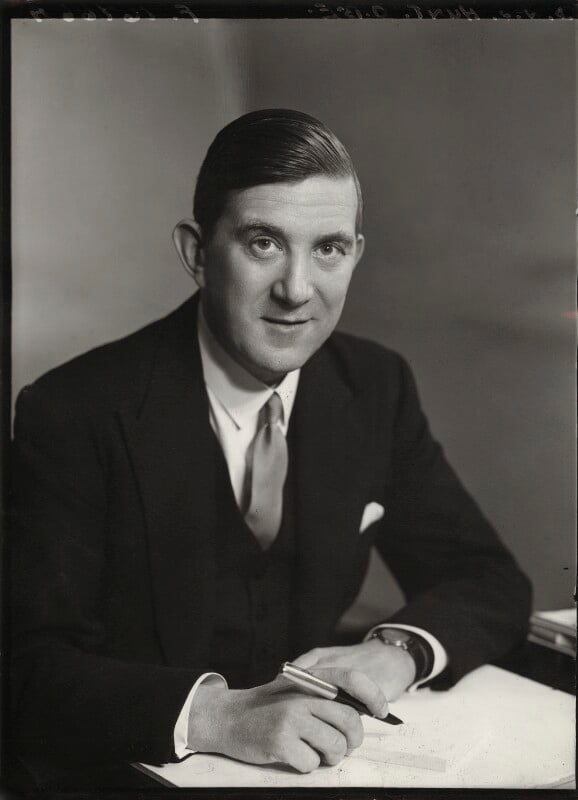
- Hunt in 1953

British Ambassador to Brazil
- In office 1969 – 1973
- Preceded by: John Russell
- Succeeded by: Derek Dodson

British High Commissioner to Nigeria
- In office 1967 – 1969
- Preceded by: Francis Cumming-Bruce
- Succeeded by: Leslie Glass

British High Commissioner to Cyprus
- In office 1965 – 1967
- Preceded by: Alec Bishop
- Succeeded by: Norman Costar

Personal details
- Born: David Wathen Stather Hunt; 25 September 1913 Durham, England
- Died: 30 July 1998 (aged 84)
- Education: Wadham College, Oxford
- Occupation: Diplomat

Military service
- Branch/service: British Army
- Battles/wars: World War II

Sir David Wathen Stather Hunt KCMG OBE (25 September 1913 – 30 July 1998) was a British diplomat, perhaps best remembered as winner of the BBC's Mastermind television quiz in 1977.

== Life and career ==
Hunt was born in Durham, and studied at Wadham College, Oxford. He served with distinction in World War II, he received his OBE in 1943 and entered the diplomatic service in 1947. He served as Private Secretary to prime ministers Clement Attlee and Winston Churchill from 1950 to 1952, then became Deputy High Commissioner for the UK in Lahore, Pakistan. In 1956, Hunt joined the Commonwealth Relations Office as head of the Central African Department, in 1959 he became Assistant Under-Secretary of State and received a CMG.

In 1960, Hunt was appointed Deputy High Commissioner for the UK in Lagos, Federation of Nigeria, in 1962 he became High Commissioner in Uganda, receiving a KCMG in 1963, which entails a knighthood. From 1965 to 1967 he was the British High Commissioner to Cyprus.

From 1967 to 1969, he served as High Commissioner to Nigeria. In this capacity, Hunt was criticized for his and the Wilson governments actions during the Nigerian Civil War by opposition politicians and journalists, among them Frederick Forsyth, who covered the conflict on the ground.

Subsequently, beginning in 1969, Hunt was British Ambassador to Brazil, retiring in 1973. In 1975, he published On the spot: an ambassador remembers about his tenure in Brazil.

=== Retirement ===
Hunt was appointed chairman of the Governors of the Commonwealth Institute in 1973. He joined the board of directors of The Observer around 1977. In addition to writing, Hunt was a frequent reviewer for The Times Literary Supplement. He later served as President of the Society for the Promotion of Hellenic Studies from 1986-1990.

=== Mastermind ===
Hunt won the Mastermind title in 1977 and was runner-up in the Mastermind International of 1979 (won by John Mulcahy of Ireland).

In 1982, a Champion of Champions tournament among the first ten Mastermind champions was televised. Hunt won the overall title with his specialist subject of Alexander the Great.

== Personal life ==
Hunt married Pamela Medawar in 1948, they had two sons together. In 1968, he married Iro Myrianthousis, who outlived him.

== Honours ==
1943: Officer of the Most Excellent Order of the British Empire (OBE)

1959: Companion of the Most Distinguished Order of St Michael and St George (CMG)

1963: Knight Commander of the Order of St Michael and St George (KCMG, knighthood)

== Publications ==
Hunt had a number of books published:

- A Don at War. London: F. Cass. 1990 [1966]. ISBN 978-0-7146-3383-1.
- On the spot: an ambassador remembers. London: P. Davies. 1975. ISBN 978-0-432-06962-2.
- Memoirs military and diplomatic (Revised ed.). London: Trigraph. 2006 [1998]. ISBN 978-0-947961-10-7. A revised edition of the two books A Don at war and On the spot: an ambassador remembers.
- Footprints in Cyprus : an illustrated history. London: Trigraph. 1990 [1982]. ISBN 978-0-9508026-7-1.. Co-authored with J.N. Coldstream

== Sources ==
Diplomatic posts
Preceded by TBA	Private Secretary for Foreign Affairs to the Prime Minister; 1950-1952	Succeeded by Anthony Montague Browne
