= Peter Jay (journalist) =

British diplomat (1937–2024)

The Honourable Peter Jay

British Ambassador to the United States
- In office 1977–1979
- Monarch: Elizabeth II
- Prime Minister: James Callaghan
- Preceded by: Peter Ramsbotham
- Succeeded by: Nicholas Henderson

Personal details
- Born: 7 February 1937 London, England
- Died: 22 September 2024 (aged 87) Woodstock, Oxfordshire, England
- Spouses: Margaret Callaghan (m. 1961; div. 1986) Emma Bettina Thornton (m. 1986)
- Children: 7
- Parents: Douglas Jay, Baron Jay; Peggy Garnett
- Education: Dragon School; Winchester College
- Alma mater: Christ Church, Oxford

Peter Jay (7 February 1937 – 22 September 2024) was an English journalist, broadcaster, and economist. He served as the British Ambassador to the United States from 1977 to 1979 during the prime-ministership of his father-in-law, James Callaghan.

After leaving public life, Jay became the founding chairman of the breakfast television station TV-am and was Chief of Staff to Robert Maxwell. He served as a governor of the Ditchley Foundation from 1982 to 1987 and as a non-executive director of the Bank of England from 2003 to 2009.

== Early life and education ==
Peter Jay was born in Hampstead, London, on 7 February 1937, the son of Douglas Jay, who fifty years later was created a life peer as Baron Jay, and Peggy Jay, both of whom were Labour politicians. He was privately educated, firstly at the Dragon School, Oxford (the school of several senior Labour politicians, including Hugh Gaitskell), and then Winchester College.

Jay studied at Christ Church, Oxford, where he graduated with a first-class honours degree in PPE. In the Trinity term of 1960, he was president of the Oxford Union.

He was commissioned into the Royal Naval Reserve as part of his National Service, where he was a Midshipman and then Sub-lieutenant. He then worked as a civil servant at HM Treasury before becoming a journalist and for ten years was the economics editor of The Times.

== Career ==
In the early 1970s, Jay became the principal presenter of the London Weekend Television Sunday news analysis programme Weekend World. He co-authored, with his friend John Birt, a series of articles for The Times in 1972, in which they criticised standard television journalism and developed what came to be called their "mission to explain". In December 1974 he was a panellist on the BBC gameshow Call My Bluff.

In 1977, during his father-in-law James Callaghan's term as Prime Minister, Jay was recommended for the post of Ambassador to the United States by his friend David Owen, the Foreign Secretary. As Jay was just 40 years old, was not a diplomat and had never held any public office; the appointment caused some controversy and accusations of nepotism.

In 1983, as the leader of a consortium of high-profile media figures, including Angela Rippon, David Frost, Michael Parkinson and Anna Ford, Jay won the franchise and became the founding chairman of TV-am, a breakfast TV station launched by the consortium. When the initial focus on news and current affairs did not yield economic success, he resigned.

Jay became Chief of Staff to Robert Maxwell during Maxwell's most high-profile years, although his position was, according to the journalist Stephen Bates, "little more than that of a bag carrier and general dogsbody". Jay suffered bullying from Maxwell throughout his three years of employment: Maxwell called him "Mr Ambassador", and subjected him to "a barrage of late night phone calls and a daily round of humiliation." He left Maxwell's employment and returned to broadcast journalism after John Birt appointed him the position of Economics Editor of the BBC. He also presented the series Road to Riches for the corporation. Described as "the highlight of his time at the BBC", it examined the economic history of mankind. He wrote the accompanying book, The Road to Riches or the Wealth of Man (2000), and also co-wrote, with Michael Stewart, the speculative historical novel Apocalypse 2000: Economic Breakdown and the Suicide of Democracy (1987).

While his father was closely linked with Keynesian economics, Jay increasingly identified himself with the new "monetarian" school associated with Milton Friedman, a man with whom he was close friends. Jay also debated with Friedman and Thomas Sowell, including two episodes of Friedman's TV series Free to Choose (1980). Jay was also the moderator of the discussions in the British version of Free to Choose. Jay was credited with helping write James Callaghan's speech at the 1976 Labour Party Conference. The speech is seen as something of a turning point, with Callaghan declaring: "We used to think that you could spend your way out of a recession, and increase employment by cutting taxes and boosting Government spending. I tell you in all candour that that option no longer exists", a rejection of the previously dominant Keynesian logic and a reflection of the ascendency of monetarism.

Between June 2003 and May 2009, Jay was a non-executive director of the Bank of England. He was a governor of the Ditchley Foundation from 1982 until 1987, and was formerly a councillor on Woodstock town council and served as the town's mayor from 2008 to 2010.

== Personal life ==
Jay married Margaret Callaghan, the daughter of Labour politician James Callaghan, in 1961. The couple divorced in 1986 after she had a public affair with the journalist Carl Bernstein. In 1986 Jay married his second wife, Emma Bettina, daughter of the museum curator and writer Peter Thornton.

Jay had seven children, one of whom was as a result of an affair with his children's nanny. Jay initially refused to accept paternity, but a DNA test proved the point and he paid for the child's maintenance.

Jay died on 22 September 2024 at the age of 87, at his home in Woodstock, Oxfordshire.

Diplomatic posts
Preceded by Sir Peter Ramsbotham	British Ambassador to the United States; 1977–1979	Succeeded by Sir Nicholas Henderson
