= Herwald Ramsbotham, 1st Viscount Soulbury =

British Conservative politician (1887–1971)

The Right Honourable The Viscount Soulbury GCMG GCVO OBE MC PC DL
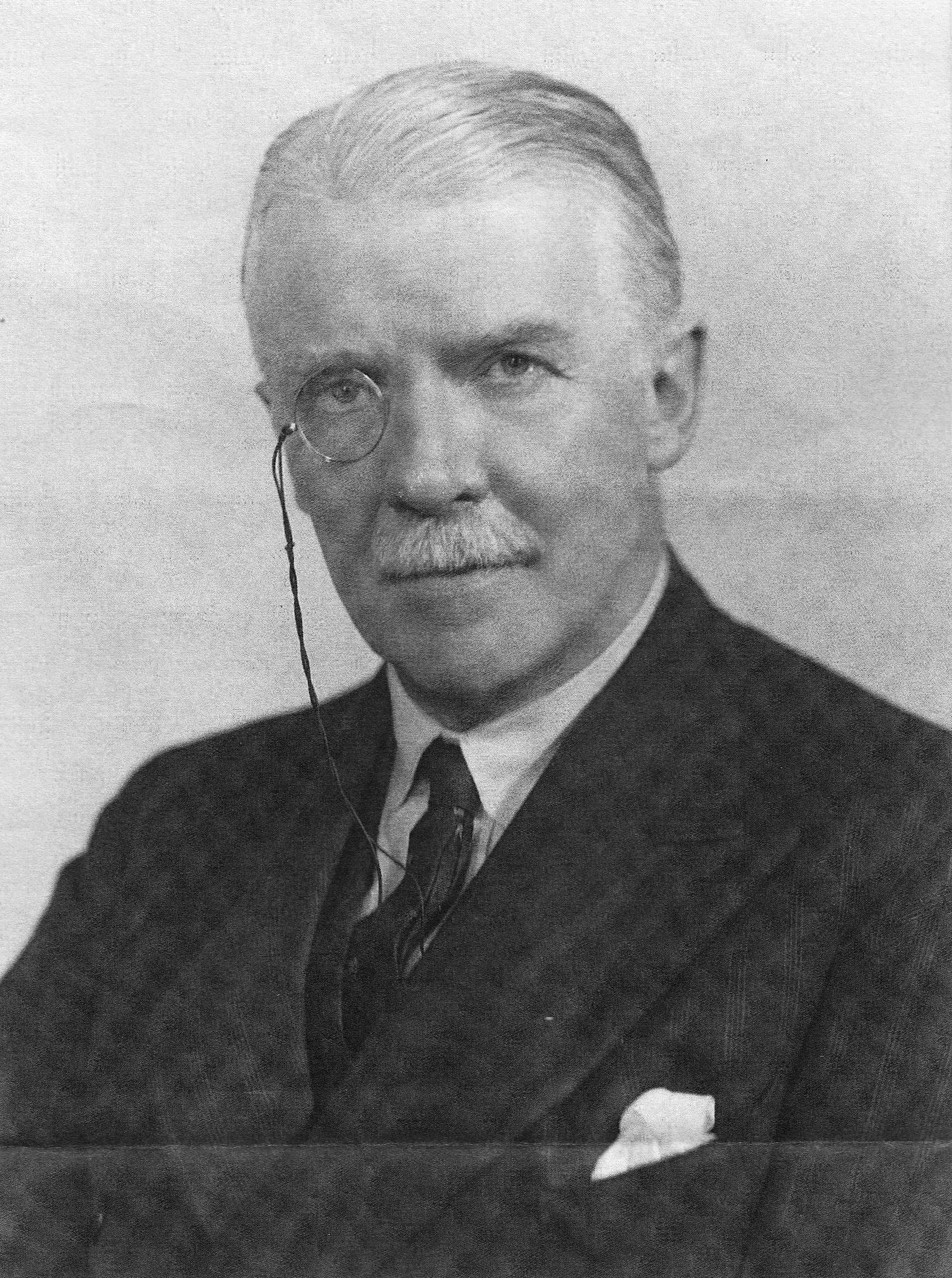

Governor-General of Ceylon
- In office 6 July 1949 – 17 July 1954
- Monarchs: George VI; Elizabeth II
- Prime Minister: D. S. Senanayake; Dudley Senanayake
- Preceded by: Sir Henry Monck-Mason Moore
- Succeeded by: Sir Oliver Ernest Goonetilleke

President of the Board of Education
- In office 3 April 1940 – 20 July 1941
- Monarch: George VI
- Prime Minister: Neville Chamberlain; Winston Churchill
- Preceded by: The Earl De La Warr
- Succeeded by: R. A. Butler

First Commissioner of Works
- In office 7 June 1939 – 3 April 1940
- Monarch: George VI
- Prime Minister: Neville Chamberlain
- Preceded by: Sir Philip Sassoon, Bt
- Succeeded by: The Earl De La Warr

Minister of Pensions
- In office 30 July 1936 – 7 June 1939
- Monarchs: Edward VIII; George VI
- Prime Minister: Stanley Baldwin; Neville Chamberlain
- Preceded by: Robert Hudson
- Succeeded by: Sir Walter Womersley, Bt

Personal details
- Born: 6 March 1887
- Died: 30 January 1971 (aged 83)
- Party: Conservative
- Children: James Ramsbotham, 2nd Viscount Soulbury; Peter Ramsbotham, 3rd Viscount Soulbury

Herwald Ramsbotham, 1st Viscount Soulbury GCMG GCVO OBE MC PC DL (6 March 1887 – 30 January 1971) was a British Conservative politician. He served as a government minister between 1931 and 1941 and served as Governor-General of Ceylon between 1949 and 1954.

== Background ==
Ramsbotham was the son of Herwald Ramsbotham, of Crowborough Warren, Crowborough, East Sussex, JP for Sussex (son of James Ramsbotham, of Todmorden, Lancashire, JP, and wife Jane Fielden), and Ethel Margaret Bevan.

He went to Uppingham School, Uppingham, Rutland, England.

== Military career ==
Ramsbotham was commissioned a Temporary Lieutenant in 1915 and was promoted to temporary Captain later the same year. He was promoted to temporary Major by 1918 and received the Military Cross. He was appointed an OBE in 1919 and relinquished his commission that year.

== Political career ==
=== Early career ===
Ramsbotham was elected Member of Parliament (MP) for Lancaster in 1929. In 1931 he was appointed Parliamentary Secretary to the Board of Education by Ramsay MacDonald, a post he retained when Stanley Baldwin became Prime Minister in June 1935, and then served as Parliamentary Secretary to the Ministry of Agriculture and Fisheries between November 1935 and July 1936. In September 1936 he was made Minister of Pensions by Baldwin. He continued in this office when Neville Chamberlain became Prime Minister in May 1937. In June 1939 he was appointed First Commissioner of Works and sworn of the Privy Council.

=== President of the Board of Education ===
Ramsbotham entered the Cabinet (but not the small inner War Cabinet) in April 1940 as President of the Board of Education. He remained in this office after Winston Churchill became Prime Minister in May 1940. In June 1940 Cardinal Arthur Hinsley, leader of the English Catholic Church, led a deputation to Ramsbotham to demand financial support for Catholic schools. Ramsbotham acknowledged that in principle the Catholic schools needed help but made no firm commitment, and stressed that greater state control over their schools, which the Catholic hierarchy did not want, would be the quid pro quo.

Ramsbotham spoke to the Lancashire NUT in Morecambe (reported in The Times on 17 March 1941). He wanted the school leaving age raised from 14 to 15, and thereafter to 16, as soon as possible, and day continuation classes up to the age of 18 (classes of this kind had been proposed in the 1918 Fisher Act and in subsequent reform proposals, but had not been implemented due to cost constraints - the same was true of the raising of the leaving age). All depended on how quickly schools could be repaired (both from war damage, and the previous poor state of many church schools), which would mean competing with housing for building priorities.

Ramsbotham's department produced a set of proposals for reform, called "The Green Book" after its cover, in June 1941. The Green Book was supposedly confidential but was widely distributed among opinion formers, as Lester Smith put it, “in a blaze of secrecy”, and was later used as the basis for talks with local education authorities (LEAs) and teaching unions. Paragraph 137 proposed compensating for greater state control of church schools by partially lifting the Elementary Education Act 1870's ban on denominational instruction in state schools, to allow such teaching from the age of 11. Paradoxically this was not good enough for the churches, as the proposal for separate state schools from the age of 11 would reduce their control over children aged 11–14, who up until that time had been educated in church schools. R. A. Butler later wrote in his memoirs that the Green Book failed on the issue of denominational teaching in state schools. The Roman Catholic hierarchy rejected the Green Book out of hand. The Green Book was soon overshadowed by the Five Points, the Protestant Churches' proposals on Religious Education in state schools which had been issued in February.

Although many of Ramsbotham's proposals would later be incorporated into Butler's 1944 Act, Churchill nursed memories of the controversy over the 1902 Act and did not favour major education reform at this stage. He used the March speech as an excuse to remove him – he was succeeded by Butler in July 1941 and sent to the House of Lords as a viscount.

=== Peerage ===
In August Ramsbotham was raised to the peerage as Baron Soulbury, of Soulbury in the County of Buckingham, and made Chairman of the Assistance Board, a post he held until 1948. Chairman of the Soulbury Commission 1944–45. Between 1949 and 1954 he served as Governor-General of Ceylon. He was appointed a GCMG in 1949 and a GCVO on 20 April 1954. On 10 June of that year, he was further honoured when he was created Viscount Soulbury, of Soulbury in the County of Buckingham.

== Family ==
Lord Soulbury died in January 1971 at the age of 83.

He was succeeded in the viscountcy by his elder son James Ramsbotham, 2nd Viscount Soulbury. His younger son, Sir Peter Ramsbotham, notably served as British Ambassador to the United States from 1974 to 1977.

Coat of arms of Herwald Ramsbotham, 1st Viscount Soulbury
Crest A Plate charged with a Ram's Head erased per pale Gules and Sable Escutcheon Sable on a Chevron Or between three Plates each charged with a Cross Patty Gules a Ram's Head erased of the first Supporters On either side a Raven proper charged with a Plate thereon a Cross Patty Gules Motto Non Vi Sed Virtute (Not by force but by virtue)

== Books ==
- Barber, Michael The Making of the 1944 Education Act, Cassell 1994 ISBN 0-304-32661-5
- Butler, Rab (1971). The Art of the Possible. London: Hamish Hamilton. ISBN 978-0241020074., his autobiography
- Howard, Anthony RAB: The Life of R. A. Butler, Jonathan Cape 1987 ISBN 978-0-224-01862-3 excerpt
- Jago, Michael Rab Butler: The Best Prime Minister We Never Had?, Biteback Publishing 2015 ISBN 978-1849549202
- Matthew, Colin (2004). Dictionary of National Biography. Vol. 9. Oxford: Oxford University Press. ISBN 978-0198614111., essay on Butler written by Ian Gilmour

Parliament of the United Kingdom
Preceded by Robert Parkinson Tomlinson	Member of Parliament for Lancaster; 1929–1941	Succeeded by Fitzroy Maclean
Political offices
Preceded by Sir Kingsley Wood	Parliamentary Secretary to the Board of Education; 1931–1935	Succeeded by The Earl De La Warr
Preceded by The Earl De La Warr	Parliamentary Secretary to the Ministry of Agriculture and Fisheries; 1935–1936	Succeeded by The Earl of Feversham
Preceded by Robert Hudson	Minister of Pensions; 1936–1939	Succeeded by Walter Womersley
Preceded by Sir Philip Sassoon, Bt	First Commissioner of Works; 1939–1940	Succeeded by The Earl De La Warr
Preceded by The Earl De La Warr	President of the Board of Education; 1940–1941	Succeeded by R. A. Butler
Government offices
Preceded by Sir Henry Monck-Mason Moore	Governor-General of Ceylon; 1949–1954	Succeeded by Sir Oliver Ernest Goonetilleke
Peerage of the United Kingdom
New creation	Viscount Soulbury; 1954–1971	Succeeded by James Herwald Ramsbotham
New creation	Baron Soulbury; 1941–1971	Succeeded by James Herwald Ramsbotham
