= High Commission of the United Kingdom, Kampala =

Diplomatic mission of the United Kingdom to Uganda

British High Commission Kampala
- Location: Uganda
- Address: Plot 4, Windsor Loop, Kamwokya PO. Box 7070, Kampala
- Coordinates: 00°20′18″N 32°35′05″E
- High Commissioner: Lisa Chesney MBE
- Website: Official website

The embassy's location in Uganda

The British High Commission Kampala is the diplomatic mission of the Government of the United Kingdom to Uganda. It is located on Windsor Loop in the Kampala suburb of Kamwokya. The current British High Commissioner is Lisa Chesney MBE.

== History ==
Uganda became an independent sovereign country in October 1962, at which time a British High Commission was established in Kampala.

A 0.2-hectare (0.49-acre) site on which to build High Commission offices was leased for 99 years from 1963 at 10-12 Obote Avenue (sometimes called Parliament Avenue). The building, square with a central courtyard, was designed by the Ministry of Works, with PA Searle as the architect, and completed in 1967.

Britain broke off diplomatic relations with Uganda in July 1976, at which time the High Commission was closed down. The High Commissioner's residence was let to the resident representative of the United Nations during this time. A British interests section was maintained in the French Embassy in Uganda until June 1977, when it too was closed. Following the overthrow of President Idi Amin in 1979, diplomatic relations between Britain and Uganda were re-established, and the High Commission reopened in April 1979.

It was not many years before the building proved too large and surplus space was sublet, including to the British Council and the American Embassy. Following the introduction of a visa regime in 1990, space low down in the IPS building, next door at 14 Parliament Avenue, was leased and converted to visa uses.

The 1998 United States embassy bombings in Nairobi and Dar es Salaam was a clear warning that new offices, with greater stand-off distances than achievable near a city centre, were required. A new site was bought on the outskirts of the city in the current location in Kamwokya for £540,000 in 2001, and Ridge and Cullum and Nightingale were commissioned respectively as project managers and architects.

After a succession of setbacks, the offices were opened in 2005, at an outturn cost of about £8 million.

Kate Airey began as the 21st High Commissioner of Uganda in November 2020, alongside Louise Ellis as Deputy High Commissioner who had begun in September 2020.

== Current offices ==
The development comprises three separate but closely related buildings with a landscaped courtyard. Each building is composed of a concrete frame with a brick masonry envelope and hollow-clay-block floors.

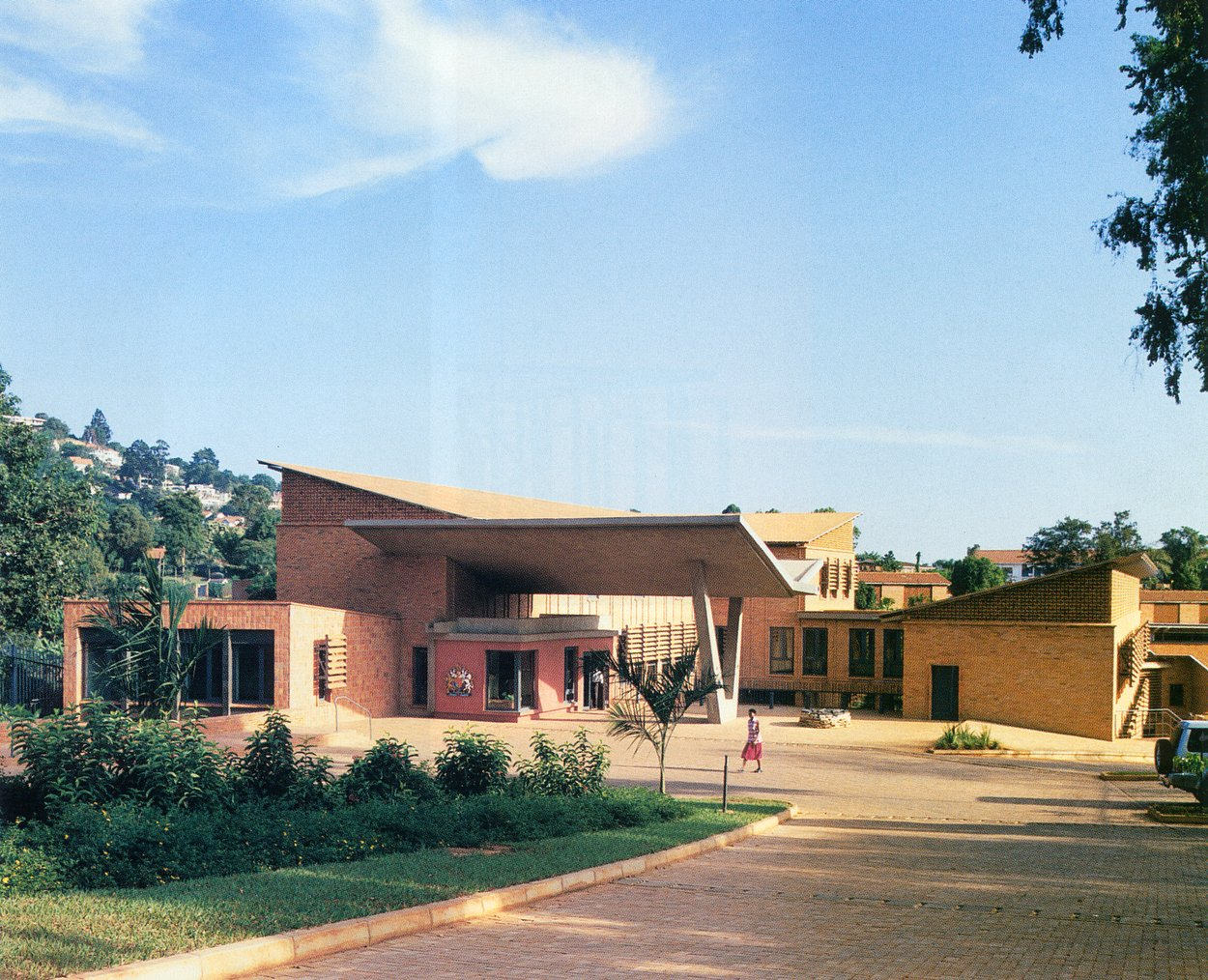
British High Commission Kampala Offices

The construction runs counter to the direction of the steep site to create a rise from two storeys at the entrance side, through three storeys at courtyard level to four storeys at the lowest end.

Fired clay is displayed in the walls, the roofs and parts of the floor. The bricks in the external wall are laid rough face out, contrasting with the grey-framed glass windows.

The roof of the visa-consular building is also clay tile, but double pitched with a clerestory vent. In each wing of the main building, rooms are arranged in a row off a single-loaded corridor that faces the courtyard, allowing for cross-ventilation. Each room is simple, with a wooden door off the circulation spine.

== Functions ==
The British High Commission in Uganda maintains and develops relations between the UK and Uganda. They are responsible for the political relationship between the UK and Uganda, and provide advice and guidance on political and governance issues.

They also provide assistance and documentary services to British nationals in Uganda. The UK Department for International Trade section provides assistance to both British and Ugandan businesses.

== See also ==
- List of diplomatic missions in Uganda
- List of high commissioners of the United Kingdom to Uganda
