= Peter Ramsbotham =

British diplomat and colonial administrator

The Right Honourable The Viscount Soulbury GCMG GCVO KStJ DL
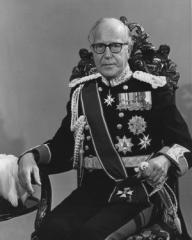

Governor of Bermuda
- In office 1977–1980
- Monarch: Elizabeth II
- Prime Minister: James Callaghan; Margaret Thatcher
- Preceded by: Edwin Leather
- Succeeded by: Richard Posnett

British Ambassador to the United States
- In office 1974–1977
- Monarch: Elizabeth II
- Prime Minister: Harold Wilson; James Callaghan
- Preceded by: Rowland Baring
- Succeeded by: Peter Jay

British Ambassador to Iran
- In office 1971–1973
- Prime Minister: Edward Heath
- Preceded by: Denis Wright
- Succeeded by: Anthony Parsons

British High Commissioner to Cyprus
- In office 1969–1971
- Prime Minister: Edward Heath; Harold Wilson
- Preceded by: Norman Costar
- Succeeded by: Robert Humphrey Edmonds

Personal details
- Born: 8 October 1919 London, United Kingdom
- Died: 9 April 2010 (aged 90) New Alresford, Hampshire
- Spouse(s): Frances Marie Massie Blomfield (died 1982); Zaida Mary Hall
- Children: 3
- Parent: Herwald Ramsbotham, 1st Viscount Soulbury (father)
- Education: Magdalen College, Oxford
- Awards: Mention in Despatches; Croix de Guerre

Military service
- Branch/service: British Army
- Years of service: 1942–1948
- Rank: Lieutenant colonel
- Unit: Intelligence Corps
- Battles/wars: World War II

Peter Edward Ramsbotham, 3rd Viscount Soulbury, GCMG, GCVO, KStJ, DL (8 October 1919 – 9 April 2010) was a British diplomat and colonial administrator.

== Early life ==
Born in London, Ramsbotham was the younger son of Herwald Ramsbotham, later the 1st Viscount Soulbury. He was educated at Eton College and at Magdalen College, Oxford. At Oxford he contracted polio in 1938, which left him with a slightly shorter right leg.

== World War II ==
He was already working for MI5 as a civilian when he joined the army on the outbreak of the Second World War. In April 1941, Ramsbotham was working in B3 Division of MI5 (Communications) with the task of studying the activities of foreign journalists in the UK. In July he was with B3A (Censorship) before moving to E3 (Alien Control – USA citizens in the UK and other territories). By 1943 he was with E2 Division dealing with nationals from the Baltic states, the Balkans and Central Europe. In June 1943, he left MI5 and was later commissioned into the Intelligence Corps on 9 June 1944. As a fluent speaker in French, he continued to work with MI5 on the Continent as a member of 106 Special Counter Intelligence Unit (SCIU), running double agents and acting as a liaison officer to the counter-espionage section of the French Intelligence Service. He also reported to the '212' Committee', the Allied equivalent of MI5's 'XX Committee' ('Double Cross Committee'). At the close of hostilities, he was employed in the Political Division of the Control Commissions for both Germany and Austria and served also in Hamburg and Berlin. In recognition of his exemplary service during the war, he received a Mention in Despatches in August 1945 and was awarded a Croix de Guerre on 1 March 1949 (en bloc).

== Diplomatic Service ==
In 1948, Ramsbotham joined the diplomatic service on the advice of his superior, Sir Christopher Steel. He failed the Foreign Office exam on his first attempt, due to poor mathematical skill, but passed six months later after some coaching. His first position was in the German Department of the Foreign Office in London.

His posts included High Commissioner to Cyprus (1969–1971) Ambassador to Iran (1971–1974) and Ambassador to the United States (1974–1977). He had a close relationship with Jimmy Carter, and was the first ambassador Carter invited to the White House.

Ramsbotham was removed from his position as Ambassador to the United States by incoming Foreign Secretary David Owen. Owen controversially replaced him with Peter Jay, who was economics editor of The Times, the son-in-law of Prime Minister James Callaghan and Owen's personal friend.

== Governor ==
Ramsbotham's final posting was as Governor of Bermuda (1977–1980). During his governorship, the two assassins of Sir Richard Sharples, the former governor, were hanged. The executions were followed by extensive rioting, as a result of which troops had to be sent to Bermuda to restore order.

== Honours and title ==
He was appointed Companion (CMG) of the Order of St Michael and St George in 1964, promoted to Knight Commander (KCMG) in 1972, becoming Sir Peter Ramsbotham, and promoted again to Knight Grand Cross (GCMG) in 1978. In 1976, he was appointed Knight Grand Cross (GCVO) of the Royal Victorian Order as well as Knight (KStJ) of the Venerable Order of St John of Jerusalem. He inherited the title of Viscount Soulbury from his elder brother in 2004 but continued to be known as Sir Peter Ramsbotham.

== Personal life ==
His first marriage was to Frances Marie Massie Blomfield. They were married on 30 August 1941 and their marriage ended with her death in 1982. His second marriage was to Dr Zaida Mary Hall, née Megrah, in 1985 (died 17 March 2013). He died in New Alresford, Hampshire on 9 April 2010.

Diplomatic posts
Preceded by Sir Norman Costar	British High Commissioner to Cyprus; 1969–1971	Succeeded by Robert Humphrey Edmonds
Preceded by Sir Denis Wright	British Ambassador to Iran; 1971–1973	Succeeded by Sir Anthony Parsons
Preceded by The Earl of Cromer	British Ambassador to the United States; 1974–1977	Succeeded by Peter Jay
Government offices
Preceded by Sir Edwin Leather	Governor of Bermuda; 1977–1980	Succeeded by Sir Richard Posnett
Peerage of the United Kingdom
Preceded by James Ramsbotham	Viscount Soulbury; 2004–2010	Succeeded by Oliver Peter Ramsbotham
