= Martin Roth (museum director) =

German museum director

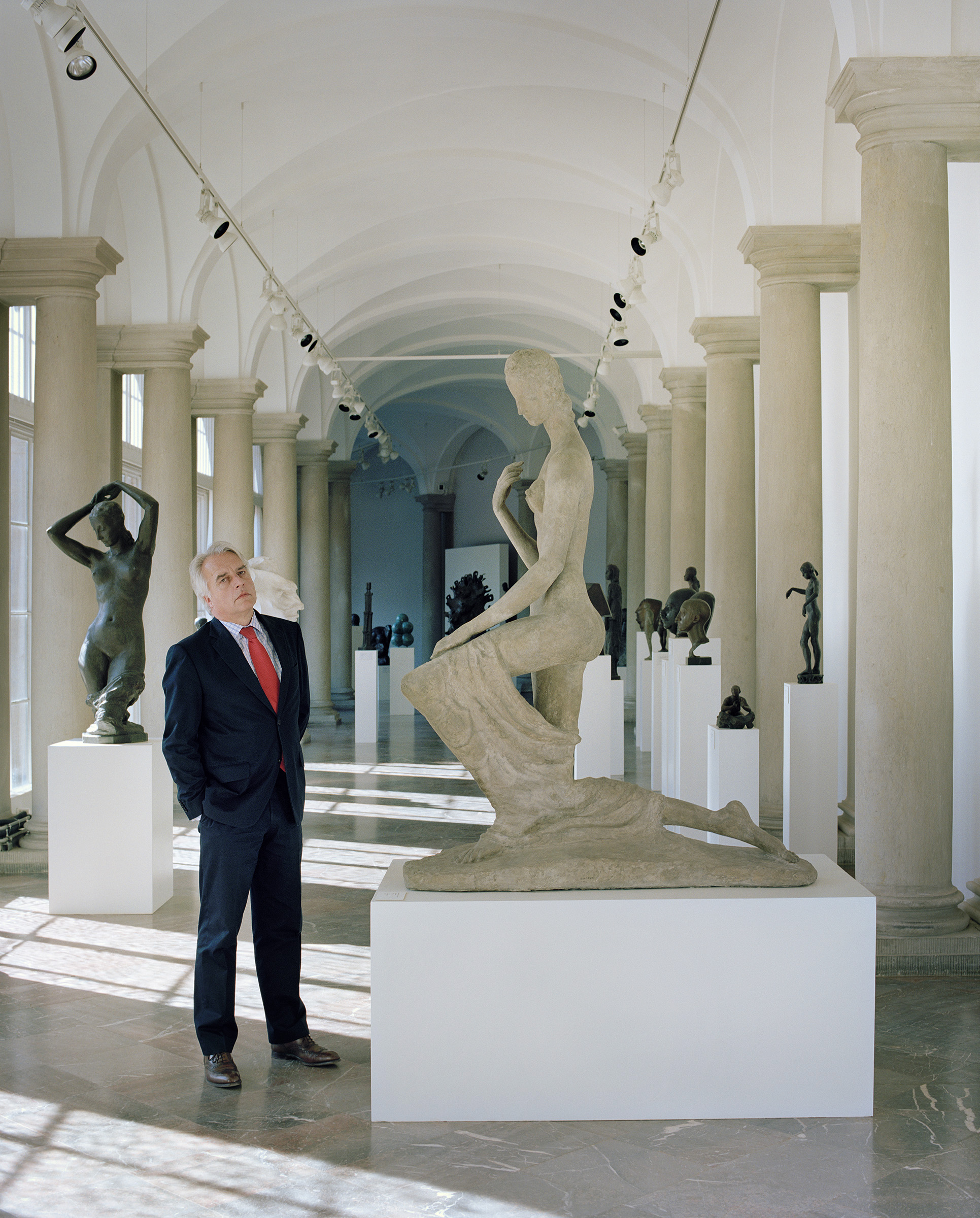
- Martin Roth photographed by Oliver Mark in front of Wilhelm Lehmbruck's 1911 figure The Kneeling Woman in the Staatliche Kunstsammlungen Dresden (2008)
- Born: 16 January 1955; Stuttgart, West Germany
- Died: 6 August 2017 (aged 62); Berlin, Germany
- Education: University of Tübingen
- Occupation: Museum director

Martin Roth (16 January 1955 – 6 August 2017) was a German museum director. He was the director general of the Dresden State Art Collections (Staatliche Kunstsammlungen Dresden) from 2001 to 2011 and the director of the Victoria and Albert Museum in London, UK, from 2011 to 2016.

== Early life ==
Martin Roth was born on 16 January 1955 in Stuttgart, Germany. He received his Ph.D. degree from the University of Tübingen in 1987: his doctoral dissertation concerned "the political and historical context of museums and exhibitions in Germany between 1871 and 1945".

== Career ==
Roth became a researcher at the École des hautes études en sciences sociales (EHESS) in Paris (and at the German Historical Institute Paris – Deutsche Historische Institute [DHI)], in charge of a comparative study on French and German Museum concepts in collaboration with the Berlin Institute for Advanced Study (Wissenschaftskolleg zu Berlin). Subsequently, in 1992, he became a visiting scholar at the Getty Research Institute in Los Angeles. He was the curator at the Deutsches Historisches Museum from 1989 to 2001, and the director of the German Hygiene Museum in Dresden, from 1991 to 2000. He was the president of the Deutscher Musemsbund e.V. (German Museums Association) from 1995 to 2003, and a member of the advisory board of the Bundesminister des Auswärtigen (German Ministry of Foreign Affairs) in Berlin until his relocation to London in 2011. From 1996 to 2001, Roth was a member of the senior management of the Expo 2000 in Hanover and the director of Thematic Exhibitions.

Roth was the director general of the Dresden State Art Collections, overseeing 12 museums and galleries.

In 2011, he left Dresden to become the director of the Victoria and Albert Museum.

Under his leadership, the museum received a record number of 3.8 million visitors. It opened the Europe 1600–1815 galleries in 2015 and reopened the Rosalinde and Arthur Gilbert Galleries in 2016. The exhibition "Savage Beauty", first shown at The Metropolitan Museum in New York and reconfigured for the V&A, won the Museums + Heritage award for Best Temporary Exhibition of 2015. The V&A was also recognized as Museum of the Year by the UK's Museum Prize Trust in 2016.

Other major projects during his directorship included the museum's new Exhibition Road entrance, designed by Amanda Levete; plans to expand with V&A East in Stratford, London; and the Kengo Kuma-designed V&A Dundee in Scotland. The V&A's international programme and profile developed markedly under Martin Roth's leadership the V&A will partner with the Smithsonian Institution to create a permanent gallery space as a part of V&A East; the V&A and China Merchants Gekou Holdings (CMGK) have jointly launched the Design Society, a complex comprising a new design museum by Maki and Associates, and the V&A Gallery.

In 2007, Roth was appointed the French Ordre des Arts et des Lettres in the rank of Chevalier and, in 2010, to the Danish Order of Dannebrog (Dannebrogordenen). In 2013, he was awarded th the Brilliant Contribution Award of International Cultural Exchange by People's Republic of China. In 2015, he received the Pushkin Medal, Russia, and Bundesverdienstkreuz 1. Klasse, Germany.

Roth stepped down as director of the V&A on 6 September 2016. While he had planned to leave the museum by 2017, he brought forward his departure following what he said was "despair" at the vote to Leave the European Union, which he described as a "personal defeat". Roth was replaced by the historian, journalist and former Labour MP Tristram Hunt.

At the time of his death, Roth was a special advisor to the German Foreign Ministry for Cultural Matters and the president-elect of IfA, Institute for Foreign Relations (Institut für Auslandsbeziehungen). He was also a trustee of the Goethe Institute, the foundation of arts and music for Dresden (Stiftung Kunst und Musik für Dresden), Germany, member of the International Olympic Committee (IOC) Agenda 2020 Culture Panel, non-executive director of Expo 2020 Dubai, member of the advisory board of the Kunstsammlung Würth, member of the board of the foundation of arts and music for Dresden (Stiftung Kunst und Musik für Dresden) and senior associate at the AEA Consulting.

== 2017 Venice Biennale controversy ==
Roth was appointed co-curator of the Azerbaijan Pavilion, sponsored by the Heydar Aliyev Foundation, at the 2017 Venice Biennale. In his curator's statement, Roth described Azerbaijan as "a blueprint for the tolerant coexistence of people of different cultures”. Azerbaijan subsequently widely reproduced printed images of Roth together with his "blueprint" assertion.

A response editorial in Der Tagesspiegel questioned whether Roth had "left his mind behind in London", pointing out that, according to Human Rights Watch, Azerbaijan, under President Ilham Aliyev (the "dictator of Baku") has "one of the worst human rights records in the international community". In a subsequent interview with German broadcaster Deutsche Welle, Roth objected to the Der Tagesspiegel article, saying that he had not been claiming Azerbaijan as a "blueprint" for "freedom" and that the Azerbaijan pavilion exhibition was not about "freedom" but was only about "tolerance and harmony", which Roth described as being "impressive" (in Azerbaijan). Deutsche Welle asked Roth how he felt about "freedom" being separated from "tolerance and harmony" and how his "blueprint for diversity and tolerance" assessment of Azerbaijan fitted with Human Rights Watch's assessment of Azerbaijan. Roth declined to reply to those issues, saying they were not suitable discussions for a live interview. He denied he had been used by Azerbaijan.

In a later interview with The Art Newspaper, Roth said that his calling Azerbaijan a "blueprint for tolerance" in his statement "might have been a mistake" but defended his involvement with Azerbaijan, saying that "the art world also needs to talk to regimes it opposes". Roth said he had been working with artists from Azerbaijan for many years. In 2015, while director of the V&A, Roth met with Azerbaijan's Minister of Culture and Tourism and was subsequently invited by Azerbaijan to the 7th Alliance of Civilizations forum held in Baku. In an interview for Berliner Zeitung, Roth said that he had visited Baku just once and that his information about the multicultural character of Azerbaijan had come from Leyla Akhundzade, Azerbaijan's Ministry of Culture and Tourism sector head.

An article in The Guardian in September 2017 revealed that Azerbaijan's ruling elite had operated a secret $2.9bn (£2.2bn) scheme to pay prominent Europeans, buy luxury goods and launder money through a network of opaque British companies. Its intention was to deflect criticism of Aliyev and to promote a positive image of his oil-rich country. However, the newspaper also points out that the money arrived via a disguised route and that not all recipients were aware of its original source. Roth is not mentioned in the article.

== Death ==
Roth died in Berlin on 6 August 2017 at the age of 62. He had been diagnosed as suffering from cancer immediately after his resignation from the V&A. In its obituary of Roth, the Moscow-based media website Vesnik Kavkaza described him as "the man who loved Azerbaijan".

== Other activities ==
- President of the Institut für Auslandsbeziehungen, Germany, 1 July 2017 until his death on 6 August
- Member of the International Olympic Committee (IOC) Agenda 2020 Culture Panel
- Member of the advisory board of the Kunstsammlung Würth
- Member of the board of the Stiftung Kunst und Musik für Dresden
- International Olympic Committee (IOC), member of the Culture and Olympic Heritage Commission
- Honorary Fellow of the Arts University Bournemouth and distinguished visiting professor at the Peter Wall Institute for Advanced Studies, University of British Columbia
