= Trinidad and Tobago–United Kingdom relations =

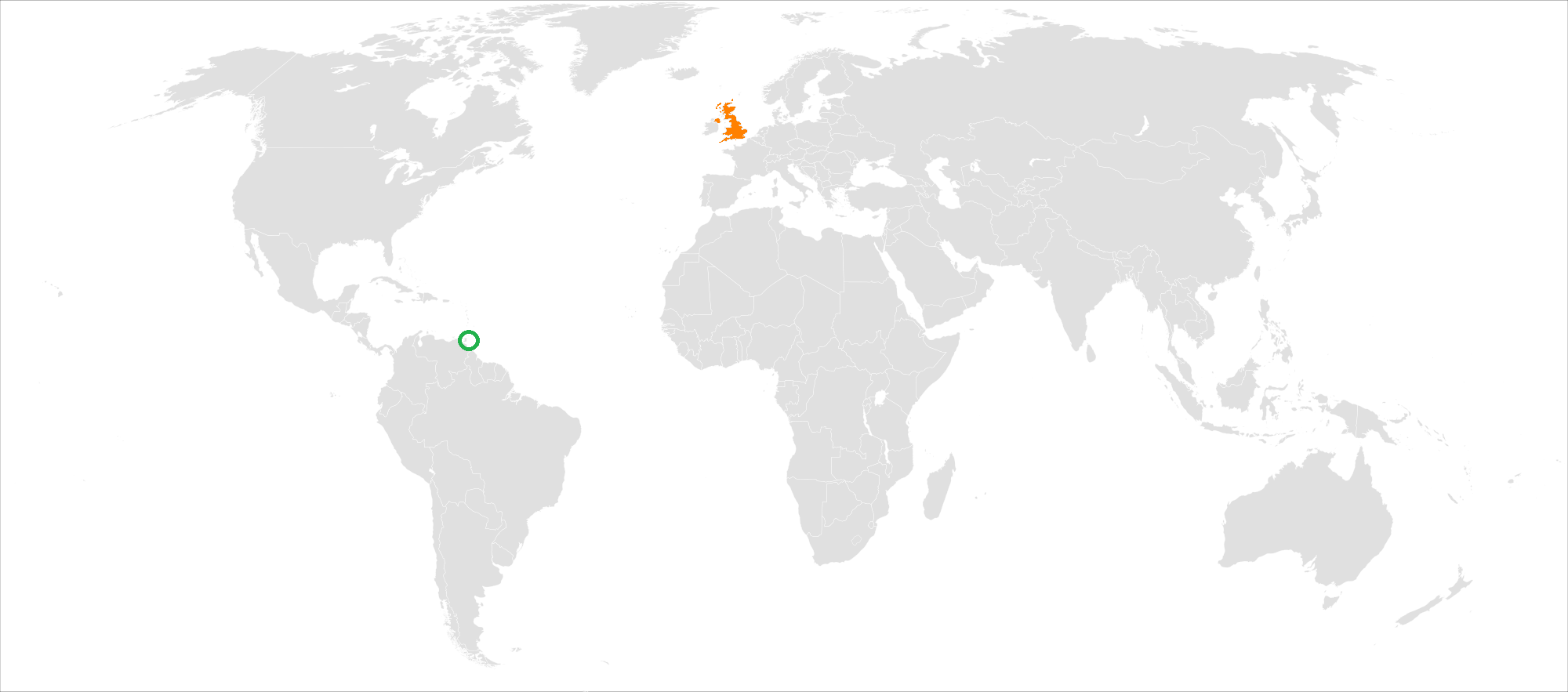

- Trinidad and Tobago: United Kingdom

British Foreign Secretary Ed Miliband with Trinidadian Foreign Minister Sean Sobers at a Commonwealth summit in Antigua, November 2026

The Republic of Trinidad and Tobago and the United Kingdom maintain diplomatic, economic, and historical interactions. Both countries established diplomatic relations on 31 August 1962.

Both countries share common membership of the Caribbean Development Bank, Commonwealth, the International Criminal Court, the United Nations, the World Trade Organization, and the CARIFORUM–UK Economic Partnership Agreement. Bilaterally the two countries have a Double Taxation Convention,

== History ==
The UK governed Trinidad and Tobago from 1797 to 1962, when Trinidad and Tobago achieved full independence.

Since the independence of Trinidad & Tobago in 1962, relations between the two countries have been mostly friendly and there are many areas in which both Trinidad and Tobago and the UK seek stronger ties for mutual benefit. There are also strong cultural and social ties between the two nations. In Trinidad and Tobago, English is one of the official languages, and Cricket is among the most popular sports. In the UK, Caribbean Carnival is hugely popular.

== Economy ==
Trinidad and Tobago is the UK's largest export market in the Caribbean. The UK is the sixth largest supplier.

== Bilateral agreements ==
Date	Agreement name	Law ref. number	Note
1983	Double Taxation Agreement	1903	

== Resident diplomatic missions ==
- Trinidad and Tobago maintains a high commission in London.
- The United Kingdom is accredited to its high commission in Port of Spain.
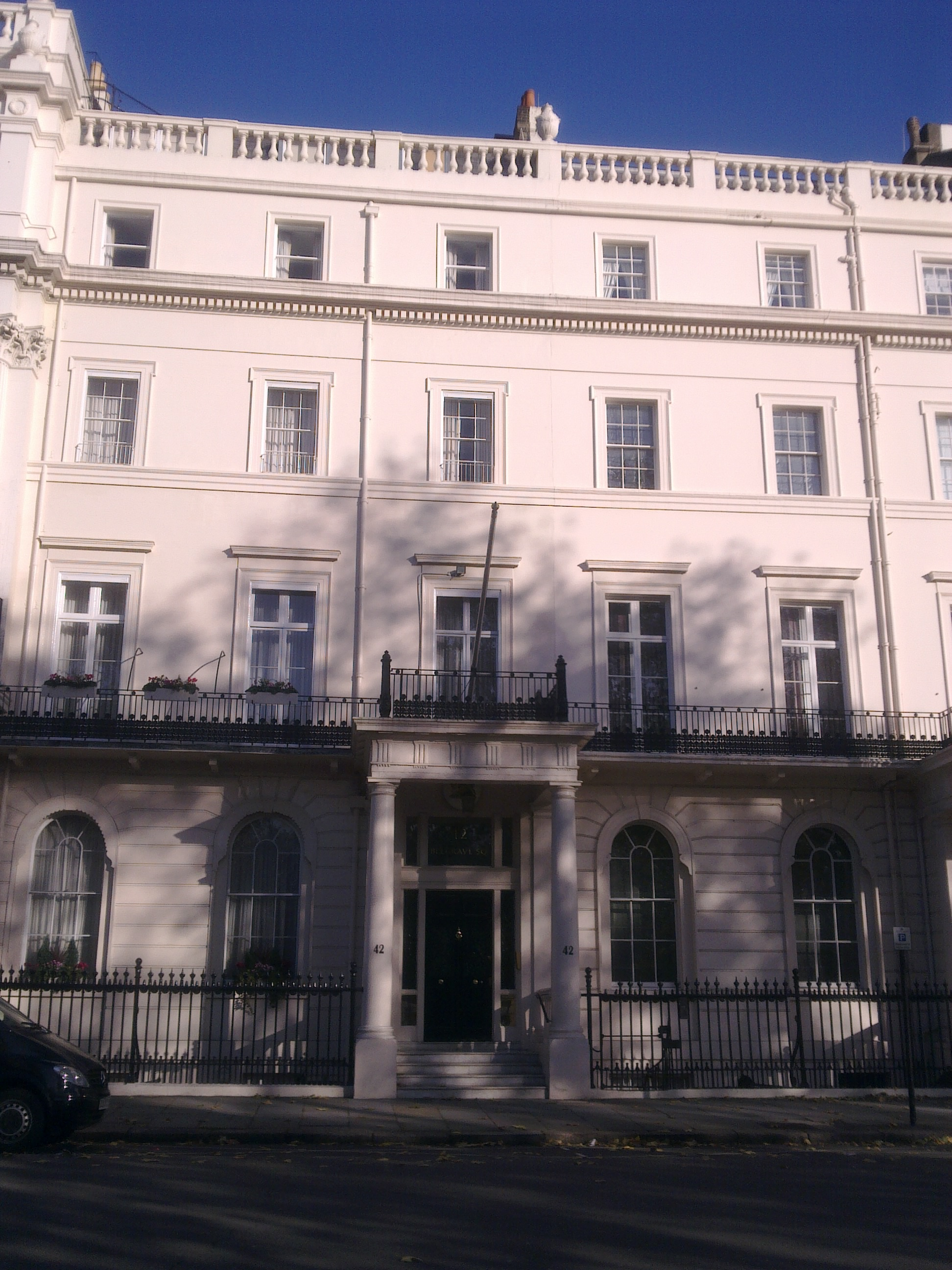
High Commission of Trinidad and Tobago in London

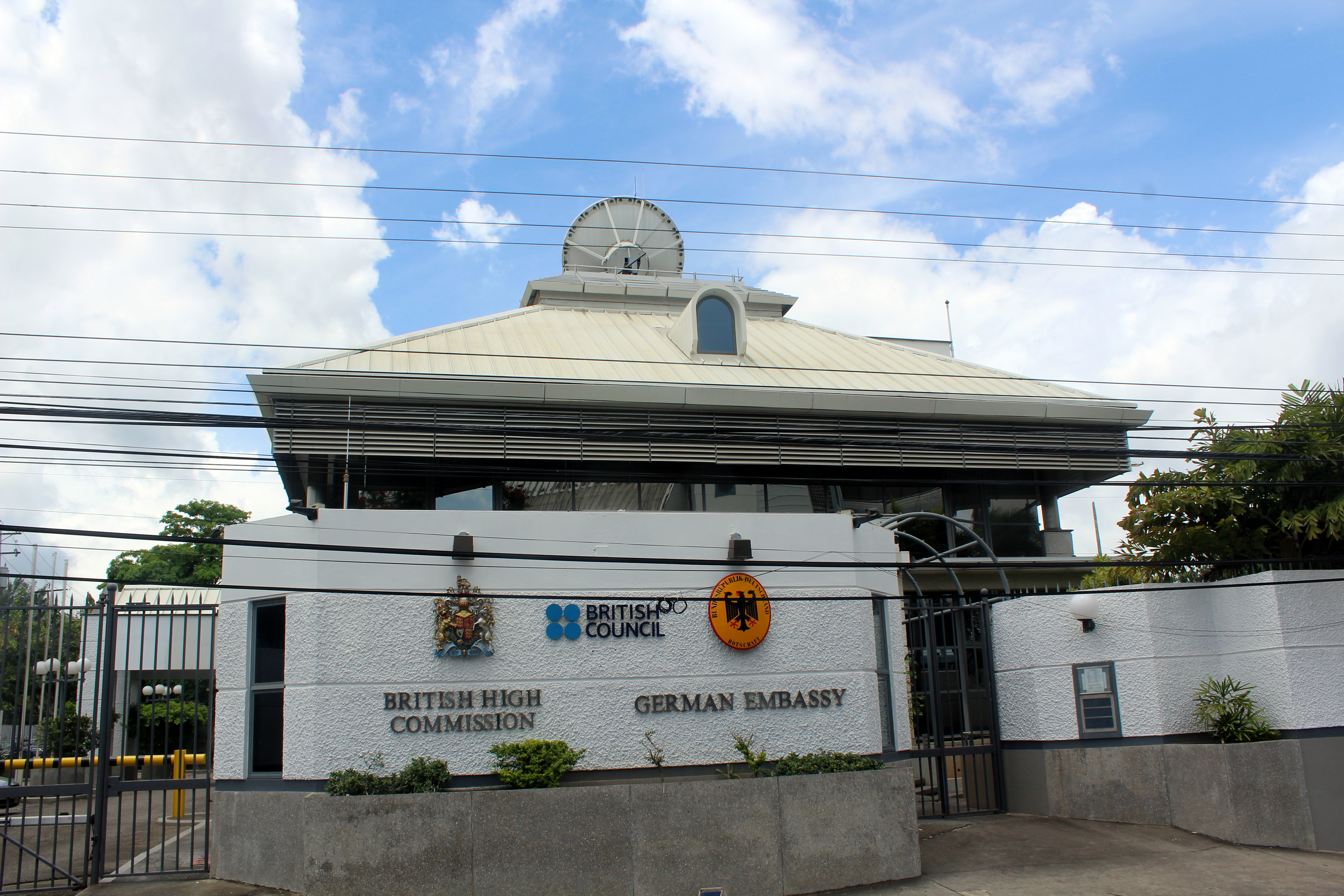
High Commission of the United Kingdom in Port of Spain

== See also ==
- CARIFORUM–United Kingdom Economic Partnership Agreement
- Economic Partnership Agreements
- Foreign relations of Trinidad and Tobago
- Foreign relations of the United Kingdom
- Trinidadian and Tobagonian British
