= Roland Hunt =

British diplomat

Roland Hunt

Roland Charles Colin Hunt CMG (19 March 1916 – 24 March 1999) was a British diplomat.

Son of Colin Bertram Hunt (1881–1967), of HM Inspectorate of Schools, and his wife Dorothea Mary (née Charles), Hunt was educated at two boarding schools: The Dragon School and Rugby School. He attended The Queen's College, Oxford.

During the Second World War, he was based in British India as a magistrate and tax collector in the Indian Civil Service. He was UK High Commissioner to Uganda from 1965 to 1967, and UK High Commissioner to Trinidad and Tobago from 1970 to 1973.

He married Pauline Garnett, daughter of James Clerk Maxwell Garnett. They had five children; three sons and two daughters. Their eldest son is Julian Hunt, Baron Hunt of Chesterton.

The Hunt family were goldsmiths and silversmiths in the eighteenth and nineteenth centuries, John Samuel Hunt (1785-1865) being in business with his uncle-by-marriage, Paul Storr; also descended from John Samuel Hunt was John Hunt, Baron Hunt of Fawley.
