= Alec Bishop =

British Army general and administrator (1897–1984)

Major-General Sir Alec Bishop KCMG CB CVO OBE
- Bishop in 1945
- Born: William Henry Alexander Bishop; 20 June 1897; Plymstock, Devon, England
- Died: 15 May 1984 (aged 86); Hastings, East Sussex, England
- Education: Plymouth College; Royal Military College, Sandhurst
- Military career
- Allegiance: United Kingdom
- Branch: British Army
- Rank: Major-General
- Service number: 11689
- Commands: Dorset Regiment
- Conflicts: First World War; Second World War
- Awards: Knight Commander of the Order of St Michael and St George; Companion of the Order of the Bath; Commander of the Royal Victorian Order; Officer of the Order of the British Empire

Major-General Sir William Henry Alexander Bishop, KCMG, CB, CVO, OBE (20 June 1897 – 15 May 1984) was a British Army officer and administrator.

== Military career ==
Bishop was born in Plymstock, Devon, the eldest child of Walter Edward Bishop and Eliza Knowles. He was educated at Plymouth College and the Royal Military College, Sandhurst. He was commissioned into the Dorset Regiment and served in India from 1919 to 1925. He also saw service in Mesopotamia and Palestine. After that he was in the War Office and the Colonial Office. He attended the Staff College, Camberley from 1927 to 1928.

In the Second World War, he served in East Africa, West Africa and North Africa but in 1944–45 was Director of Quartering at the War Office. In 1945 he became chief of information services and public relations of the Control Commission in Germany; from 1946 to 1948 he was deputy chief of staff and from 1948 to 1950 regional commissioner for North Rhine Westphalia. From 1962 to 1964, he was director of information services and cultural relations at the Commonwealth Relations Office and in 1964–65 British High Commissioner in Cyprus.

Sir Alec died in 1984 in Hastings, East Sussex, aged 86.

== Bibliography ==
- Smart, Nick (2005). Biographical Dictionary of British Generals of the Second World War. Barnesley: Pen & Sword. ISBN 1844150496.
