= 1985 Birthday Honours =

British government recognitions

Queen's Birthday Honours are announced on or around the date of the Queen's Official Birthday in Canada, New Zealand and the United Kingdom. The dates vary, both from year to year and from country to country. All are published in supplements to the London Gazette and many are formally conferred by the monarch (or her representative) some time after the date of the announcement, particularly for service people on active duty.

The 1985 Queen's Birthday honours lists were announced on 15 June 1985.

The recipients are shown below as they were styled before their new honour.

== United Kingdom ==
=== Life Peers ===
==== Barons ====
- Sir Walter Charles Marshall, C.B.E., Chairman Central Electricity Generating Board.
- The Right Honourable Robert Joseph Mellish, Deputy Chairman, London Docklands Development Corporation.

=== Privy Counsellor ===
- Barney (Bernard John) Hayhoe, Minister of State, H.M. Treasury and Member of Parliament for Brentford and Isleworth.

=== Knights Bachelor ===
- David Frederick Attenborough, C.B.E., Broadcaster.
- George Bernard Audley, Chairman, AGB Research plc.
- Professor George Malcolm Brown, Director, British Geological Survey.
- Professor David Roxbee Cox, Professor of Statistics, Imperial College of Science and Technology, University of London.
- Bernard Melchior Feilden, C.B.E. For services to architecture.
- Peter Froggatt, President and Vice-Chancellor, Queen's University of Belfast.
- Ernest Roy Griffiths. For services to the National Health Service.
- Eldon Wylie Griffiths, M.P. For political service.
- Ronald Halstead, C.B.E., Chairman and Chief Executive, Beecham Group plc.
- Leonard Maxwell Harper Gow, M.B.E., Deputy Chairman, Christian Salvesen Ltd.
- Philip Charles Harris, Chairman, Harris Queensway plc.
- John Henry Harvey-Jones, M.B.E., Chairman, Imperial Chemical Industries plc.
- Professor Francis Harry Hinsley, O.B.E., Historian.
- Arthur Hugh Hoole, President, The Law Society.
- Peter Maudslay Hordern, M.P. For political service.
- Martin Wakefield Jacomb, Vice-Chairman, Kleinwort Benson Ltd. For services to the City.
- Russell David Johnston, M.P. For political and public service.
- John Patrick Lowry, C.B.E., Chairman, Advisory, Conciliation and Arbitration Service.
- David James Lumsden, Principal, Royal Academy of Music.
- Donald Og Grant Maclean. For political and public service.
- Peter Tester Main, E.R.D., Lately Chairman, The Boots Company plc.
- Neville Marriner, C.B.E. For services to music.
- James Munn, O.B.E., Chairman, Consultative Committee on the Curriculum, and for public services in Scotland.
- Philip Alan Myers, O.B.E., Q.P.M., D.L., H.M. Inspector of Constabulary, North West Region.
- Oliver John Napier. For political service.
- Eric John Pountain, D.L., Chairman and Chief Executive, Tarmac plc. For services to Export.
- Professor Philip John Randle, Professor of Clinical Biochemistry, University of Oxford.
- Robert Basil Reid, C.B.E., Chairman, British Railways Board.
- Gordon Shattock. For political and public service.
- Alfred Henry Simpson, Chief Justice of Kenya.
- Brigadier John Nicholas Somerville, C.B.E. For political service.
- Joseph Anthony Porteous Trafford. For political and public service.
- Professor Henry William Rawson Wade, Q.C. For services to English Law.
- David Innes Williams. Director, British Postgraduate Medical Federation, University of London.

State of Queensland

- Bruce Dunstan Watson. For services to industry.

=== Order of the Bath ===
==== Knight Grand Cross of the Order of the Bath (GCB) ====
- General Sir Nigel Bagnall, K.C.B., C.V.O., M.C. (360763), Colonel Commandant Army Physical Training Corps, late 4th/7th Royal Dragoon Guards.
- The Right Honourable Sir Philip Brian Cecil Moore, G.C.V.O., K.C.B., C.M.G., Private Secretary to The Queen.

==== Knight Commander of the Order of the Bath (KCB) ====
Military Division

Royal Navy

- Vice-Admiral Richard George Alison Fitch.

Army

- Lieutenant General Michael Compton Lockwood Wilkins, O.B.E.
- Lieutenant General John Norman Stewart Arthur (418179), Colonel The Royal Scots Dragoon Guards (Carabiniers and Greys), Colonel Commandant Military Provost Staff Corps.
- Lieutenant General Brian Leslie Graham Kenny, C.B.E. (437098), Colonel Commandant Royal Army Veterinary Corps, late The Queen's Royal Irish Hussars.
- Lieutenant General Robert Alan Pascoe, M.B.E. (424428), late The Royal Green Jackets.

Royal Air Force

- Air Marshal David Parry-Evans, C.B.E., Royal Air Force.

Civil Division

- Angus McKay Fraser, C.B., T.D., Chairman, Board of Customs and Excise.
- David John Stowell Hancock, Permanent Secretary, Department of Education and Science.
- James Geoffrey Littler, C.B., Second Permanent Secretary, H.M. Treasury.

==== Companion of the Order of the Bath (CB) ====
Military Division

Royal Navy

- Rear Admiral John Perronet Barker.
- Major General John Campbell Hardy, L.V.O.
- Rear Admiral Michael Frank Simpson.

Army

- Major General John Leonard Bartlett (371490), late Royal Army Pay Corps.
- Major General Peter Irvine Chiswell, C.B.E. (414821), late The Parachute Regiment.
- Major General Brian William Davis, C.B.E. (400989), late Royal Regiment of Artillery.
- Major General William Leonard Whalley (421567), late Royal Army Ordnance Corps.

Royal Air Force

- Air Vice-Marshal David Graeme Muspratt Hills, O.B.E., Royal Air Force (Retired).
- Air Vice-Marshal Frank Martyn Holroyd, Royal Air Force.
- Air Vice-Marshal John Frederick George Howe, C.B.E., A.F.C., Royal Air Force.

Civil Division

- Stanley Clarke Agnew, Chief Engineer, Scottish Development Department.
- Clifford John Boulton, Clerk Assistant, House of Commons.
- Louis Victor Denis Calvert, Comptroller and Auditor General for Northern Ireland.
- Geoffrey Howes Chipperfield. Deputy Secretary, Department of the Environment.
- Kenneth Dowling, Deputy Director of Public Prosecutions.
- Kenneth George Forecast, Under Secretary, Cabinet Office.
- James Hunter Galbraith, Under Secretary, Department of Employment.
- John Ralph Sidney Guinness, Deputy Secretary, Department of Energy.
- David Holmes, Deputy Secretary, Department of Transport.
- Patrick William Jarvis, Deputy Secretary, Ministry of Defence.
- Miss Mary Josephine Lackey, O.B.E., Under Secretary, Department of Trade and Industry.
- Thomas Stuart Legg, Deputy Secretary, Lord Chancellor's Department.
- Miss Elizabeth Marion Llewellyn Smith, Deputy Director General, Office of Fair Trading.
- Denis Alan Peach, Chief Charity Commissioner.
- Brian Ewart Robson, Deputy Secretary, Ministry of Defence.
- Cecil Owen Shipp, O.B.E., Principal Director, Ministry of Defence.
- John Derek Taylor Thompson, Commissioner, Board of Inland Revenue.
- William Benjamin Utting, Chief Inspector, Social Services Inspectorate, Department of Health and Social Security.

=== Order of St Michael and St George ===
==== Knight Grand Cross of the Order of St Michael and St George (GCMG) ====
- Sir John Thomson, K.C.M.G., United Kingdom Permanent Representative to the United Nations, New York.

==== Knight Commander of the Order of St Michael and St George (KCMG) ====
- Bryan George Cartledge, C.M.G., H.M. Ambassador-designate, Moscow.
- Peter Harvey Marychurch, Director, Government Communications Headquarters.
- John James Andrew Reid, C.B., T.D., Chief Medical Officer, Scottish Home and Health Department; and for services to international medicine.
- (William Erskine) Hamilton Whyte, C.M.G., British High Commissioner, Singapore.

==== Companion of the Order of St Michael and St George (CMG) ====
- Professor Brian Edward Frederick Fender, lately Director, Institut Laue Langevin, Grenoble.
- Peter Standley McLean, O.B.E., Assistant Secretary, Overseas Development Administration.
- Michael William Atkinson, M.B.E., HM Ambassador-designate, Quito.
- Martin Seymour Berthoud, British High Commissioner, Port of Spain.
- Terence Joseph Clark, C.V.O., H.M. Ambassador, Baghdad.
- Brian Lee Crowe, Minister (Commercial), H.M. Embassy, Washington.
- Patrick Howard Caines Eyers, L.V.O., H.M. Ambassador, Kinshasa.
- Brian Hitch, C.V.O., Minister, H.M. Embassy, Tokyo.
- Lawrence John Middleton, Foreign and Commonwealth Office.
- Martin Robert Morland, Foreign and Commonwealth Office.
- Patrick James Murphy, Foreign and Commonwealth Office.
- John William Richmond Shakespeare, L.V.O., H.M. Ambassador, Lima.
- Alan White, O.B.E., H.M. Ambassador, La Paz.
- Nigel Christopher Ransome Williams, Minister, H.M. Embassy, Bonn.

=== Royal Victorian Order ===
==== Commander of the Royal Victorian Order (CVO) ====
- James Brown.
- Colonel John Gilbert Bourne.
- Sir John Henry Harris Davis.
- Group Captain Richard Brian Duckett, A.F.C., Royal Air Force.
- Charles Annand Fraser, L.V.O., W.S.
- Francis Nigel, Major the Lord Napier and Ettrick, L.V.O.
- Kenneth Brian Smith.

==== Lieutenant of the Royal Victorian Order (LVO) ====
- Vincent Eugene Hart.
- Brian Roff Marsh, M.C.
- Commander William Carlton McKnight, Royal Navy.
- Lieutenant Colonel Richard George Satterthwaite, O.B.E.

==== Member of the Royal Victorian Order (MVO) ====
- Kenneth Wilfred Armstrong, D.F.C.
- Miss Diana Elizabeth Atkinson.
- Philip Jeremy Bonham-Carter.
- Inspector (Acting Chief Inspector) Peter William Challenger, Metropolitan Police.
- Robert Cook.
- Squadron Leader Brian James Crawford, Royal Air Force.
- Miss Patricia Joyce Deakin.
- Philip Macdonald Dinsey.
- Peter Leslie Edwards.
- Peter Magnus Goodman.
- Sidney Wiliam Goolding.
- Miss Ivy Beatrice Hoaen.
- Donald Jackson.
- Miss Mary Penelope Oliver.
- Robert Frederick James Oliver.
- Miss Elizabeth Louise Pitney.
- Joyce Ellen, Mrs, Smith.

=== Royal Victorian Medal (RVM) ===
==== Royal Victorian Medal (Silver) ====
- Yeoman Bed Goer Albert Edward Adams, B.E.M., The Queen's Body Guard of the Yeomen of the Guard.
- Kathleen Margaret Rosina, Mrs Bawn.
- James Anthony Butler.
- Chief Petty Officer Marine Engineering Artificer Dennis Cook.
- Raymond William John Daw.
- Thomas Glossop.
- Gordon Grear.
- Philip Howell.
- Flight Sergeant Anthony Albert Hunter, Royal Air Force.
- Fred Vernon Knight.
- Adam Lazarczuk.
- Chief Petty Officer Cook Lawrence Marsh.
- Arthur Francis Martin.

=== Companion of Honour ===
- Philip Arthur Larkin, C.B.E. For services to Poetry.
- Professor Rodney Robert Porter. For services to Biochemistry.

=== Order of the British Empire ===
==== Dame Commander of the Order of the British Empire (DBE) ====
- Mary Jennifer, Mrs Jenkins. For public services.
- Joan Christabel Jill, Mrs Knight, M.B.E., M.P. For political service.
- Alison, Mrs Munro, C.B.E. For public services.
- Miss Joan Fleetwood Varley, C.B.E. For political service.

==== Knight Commander of the Order of the British Empire (KBE) ====
- Air Marshal John George Donald, O.B.E., Q.H.S., Royal Air Force.
- David Akers-Jones, C.M.G., Chief Secretary, Hong Kong.
- Henry David Alastair Capel Miers, C.M.G., H.M. Ambassador, Beirut.

==== Commander of the Order of the British Empire (CBE) ====
Military Division

Royal Navy

- Captain David Allen, Royal Navy.
- Captain Guy Francis Liardet, Royal Navy.
- Commodore John Parry, Royal Navy.

Army

- Colonel Thomas Seccombe, O.B.E., A.D.C.
- Colonel John David Blackwell (411893), late Royal Tank Regiment (now RARO).
- Colonel Graham Coxon, M.B.E. (461676), late The Duke of Edinburgh's Royal Regiment (Berkshire and Wiltshire).
- Brigadier Kenneth John Davey, M.C. (417047), late The Royal Regiment of Wales (24th/41st Foot).
- Brigadier James Cyril Groom (411958), late Royal Regiment of Artillery.
- Brigadier (now Acting Major General) Charles Edward Webb Jones (448994), late The Royal Green Jackets.
- Brigadier Ian Mackay, M.B.E., M.C. (440088), late The Royal Highland Fusiliers (Princess Margaret's Own Glasgow and Ayrshire Regiment).
- The Right Reverend Monsignor John Moran (469273), Chaplain to the Forces 1st Class, Royal Army Chaplain's Department (now RARO).
- Brigadier (now Major General) Anthony John Shaw (449523), Q.H.P., late Royal Army Medical Corps.

Royal Air Force

- Air Commodore Reginald Derek Brittain, O.B.E., Royal Air Force.
- Air Commodore John Philip Ravenscroft Browne, Royal Air Force.
- Air Commodore Jenkin Alun Morgan, O.B.E., Royal Air Force.
- Group Captain Godfrey Hugh Rolfe, M.B.E., Royal Air Force,
- Group Captain James Nankivell Sawyer, Royal Air Force.

Civil Division

- Malcolm Argent, Secretary, British Telecommunications plc.
- John Raymond Armstrong, Chairman, Road Transport Industry Training Board.
- Professor Michael Edwin Beesley, Director, Institute of Public Sector Management, London Business School.
- Albert Francis Harry Benning, lately Assistant Secretary, Ministry of Defence.
- Roger Bexon, Deputy Chairman, British Petroleum
- Doris, Mrs Birdsall. For services to education in Bradford.
- William Eric Bloomfield, Resident Director, Laing-Mowlem-ARC Joint Venture, Falkland Islands.
- Anthony John Blowers. For public services in Surrey.
- John Denys Brackenridge, Chairman, South Lincolnshire Health Authority.
- Julian Alexander Bream, O.B.E., Guitarist and Lutenist.
- (John) Jeremy David Bullmore, Chairman, J. Walter Thompson Company Ltd.
- David Gifford Campion, T.D., Chairman, Seccombe, Marshall and Campion plc.
- Frederick Stanley Clark, T.D., D.L., Regional Controller, Scotland, Department of Health and Social Security.
- Professor John Jeffrey Connell, Director, Torry Research Station, Ministry of Agriculture, Fisheries and Food.
- John Horwood Cossins. For services to the agricultural industry particularly in the South West.
- Alan Joseph Cryer, lately City Engineer, Westminster City Council.
- Julia Francis, Mrs Cumberlege. For political and public service.
- Henry George Cuming, Principal, Dundee College of Technology.
- Julia Mary, Mrs Dalgleish. For political and public service.
- Winifred Euphemia, Mrs Donaldson. For services to social work in the Lothian Region.
- Professor Alexander Shafto Douglas. For services to the Ministry of Defence Scientific Advisory Council.
- Miss Joanna Marie Drew. Director of Art, Arts Council of Great Britain.
- Major Henry Duckworth, lately Chief Commoner, City of London.
- The Honourable John Dawson Eccles, lately Deputy Chairman, Monopolies and Mergers Commission.
- Jack Trevor Edwards, Senior Partner, Freeman Fox & Partners. For services to Export.
- Malcolm John Edwards, Commercial Director, National Coal Board.
- Ian Keith Casey Ellison, Assistant Secretary, Department of Trade and Industry.
- Professor Michael Anthony Epstein, Professor of Pathology, University of Bristol.
- Lucy (Barbara Ethel), Lady Faulkner of Downpatrick, National Governor, Northern Ireland, British Broadcasting Corporation.
- Alfred Henry Ferguson, Lord Mayor of Belfast.
- Marshall Hayward Field, lately General Manager and Director, Phoenix Assurance plc.
- David Atkinson Fletcher. For political and public service.
- Kenneth Bent, Baron Grantchester, Q.C. For public service.
- Anthony George Molyneux Greenland, O.B.E. For political service.
- Ivor Reginald Guild, lately Chairman, Scottish Committee, Council on Tribunals.
- Geoffrey Ronald Hall, Director, Brighton Polytechnic.
- Anne Macintosh, Mrs Harris, lately Chairman, National Federation of Women's Institutes.
- Reginald John Hartles, Chief Education Officer, London Borough of Ealing.
- Colonel Michael Brian Haycock, T.D., D.L., Chairman, West Midlands Territorial Auxiliary and Volunteer Reserve Association.
- Donald Burnie Henderson, Q.P.M., lately Chief Constable, Northern Constabulary.
- Professor Douglas Mackay Henderson, Regius Keeper, Royal Botanic Garden, Edinburgh, Department of Agriculture and Fisheries for Scotland.
- Nicholas John Hinton, lately Director, National Council for Voluntary Organisations.
- John Richard Seymour Homan, Industrial Director, National Economic Development Office.
- Ronald George Hooker, Chairman, Henry Sykes plc.
- Professor Edward Philip George Houssemayne Du Boulay, Professor of Neuro-radiology, University of London.
- Vernon Guy Huntrods, lately Executive Director, Lloyds Bank International Ltd.
- James Keith Isaac, Director General, West Midlands Passenger Transport Executive.
- Professor Kenneth Hurlstone Jackson. For services to Celtic Studies.
- William Unsworth Jackson, Chief Executive, Kent County Council.
- Derek George Jacobi, Actor.
- Frederick Stuart Jennett, Architect, Percy Thomas Partnership.
- David Evan Alun Jones, Commissioner for Local Administration in Wales.
- Francis Henry King, O.B.E., Author; and for services to authors and writers.
- The Honourable Kenneth Henry Lowry Lamb, Secretary, Church Commissioners for England.
- Miss Patricia Lamburn (Mrs Derrick). For services to the magazine industry.
- William Herbert Laming, Director of Social Services, Hertfordshire.
- Geoffrey John Lomer, Technical Director, Racal Electronics plc.
- Thomas Mayer, Chairman and Managing Director, Thorn EMI Electronics. For services to export.
- John McCabe, Composer and pianist.
- John Minter, Chairman, North East Essex Health Authority.
- James Richard Samuel Morris. For services to Industry and Science.
- John Alderson Parry, Veterinary Practitioner. For services to agriculture particularly in Wales.
- Miss Margaret Pereira (Mrs Wells), Director, Forensic Science Service, Home Office.
- Lionel Albert Plowman, lately Secretary, Association of Metropolitan Authorities.
- Rowland Donald Potter, Assistant Secretary, Welsh Office.
- Percy Radcliffe, lately Chairman, Executive Council, Isle of Man.
- William Scotland Rankin, Senior Principal Inspector of Taxes, Board of Inland Revenue.
- Donald Arthur David Reeve, Deputy Chairman and Chief Executive, Severn Trent Water Authority.
- Antony Stuart Robertson, Chairman of Traffic Commissioners, Metropolitan Traffic Area, Department of Transport.
- Frank Edwin Roe, D.L., Divisional Managing Director, Warton Division, Aircraft Group, British Aerospace plc. For services to Export.
- Professor John Allan Fynes Rook, Second Secretary, Agricultural and Food Research Council.
- Joan, Mrs Sansom, President, East Midlands Rent Assessment Panel.
- Reginald Nicola Simeone, Comptroller of Finance and Administration, United Kingdom Atomic Energy Authority.
- Hugh John Simmonds. For political and public service.
- Samuel Martin Smith, President, Glasgow Chamber of Commerce.
- Thomas Eric Smith, Chairman, Smith's Containers Ltd.
- Terence Edward Spratt, Chairman and Managing Director, Safeway Food Stores Ltd.
- Harbourne Mackay Stephen, D.S.O., D.F.C., Managing Director, The Daily Telegraph and Sunday Telegraph plc. For services to the newspaper industry.
- Denis Synge Stephens, Q.C., lately Master, Central Office, Supreme Court of Judicature of Northern Ireland.
- William Trevor Stevenson, D.L., Chairman, Scottish Transport Group,
- Roy Irvine Stewart. For political and public service.
- Anthony Guy Stringer, Director, Oxfam.
- Richard Benjamin Thomas, O.B.E., Q.P.M., Chief Constable, Dyfed-Powys Police.
- Paul Archer Tyler. For political service.
- Richard Eric Roger Tyrrell, Managing Director, XCAN Grain (Europe) Ltd.
- John Herbert Cecil Vernon, Scientific Adviser, Ministry of Defence.
- Michael Giles Neish Walker, Chief Executive, Sidlaw Group plc.
- Thomas Archibald Warnock, lately Director, Roads Service, Department of the Environment for Northern Ireland-
- Frederick Walter Weyer. For political and public service.
- Professor Thomas Patterson Whitehead, Professor of Clinical Chemistry, and Dean, Faculty of Medicine and Dentistry, University of Birmingham.
- Professor Frank Willett, Director, Hunterian Museum and Art Gallery, University of Glasgow.
- Professor James Williamson, Professor of Geriatric Medicine, University of Edinburgh.
- Robert William Wilmot, Chairman, ICL plc.
- Ronald Arthur Wing, Chairman, Sanofi UK Ltd., For services to the pharmaceutical industry.
- Professor Otto Herbert Wolff, Nuffield Professor of Child Health, University of London; Dean, Institute of Child Health.
- William Charles Woodruff. For services to civil aviation.
- Peter Robert Wright. Director, Sadler's Wells Royal Ballet.

Diplomatic and Overseas List

- Oscar Henry Brandon. For services to journalism in the United States.
- Hugh Moss Gerald Forsgate, O.B.E. For public and community services in Hong Kong.
- Edmund Graham Gibbons, O.B.E. For public services in Bermuda.
- Professor Ho Hung-chiu, O.B.E. For medical services to the community in Hong Kong.
- Edward Thomas John Phillips, lately British Council Representative, Malaysia.
- George Norman Stansfield, O.B.E. British High Commissioner, Honiara.
- Francis Tien Yuan-hao, O.B.E. For public services in Hong Kong.

State of Queensland

- David Bassingthwaighte. For services to the Cattle Breeding Industry.
- Dr Donald Watson. For services to medicine.

==== Officer of the Order of the British Empire (OBE) ====
Military Division

Royal Navy

- Commander Antony Lovel Chilton.
- Commander Alexander William English.
- Commander George Arthur Fulcher.
- Commander Thomas Henry Green.
- Commander Thomas William Mason.
- Commander Timothy Clive Curnow Millett.
- Commander Eric Charles Pidgeon.
- Commander Frederick James Robertson.
- Lieutenant Colonel Paul Timothy Stevenson, M.B.E., Royal Marines.
- Commander Charles Peter Williams.
- Commander Terrance Ernest Woods.
- Commander Charles Gabriel Wylie.

Army

- Lieutenant Colonel John Philip Cameron, Queen's Own Highlanders (Seaforth and Camerons).
- Lieutenant Colonel James Egan, Royal Army Medical Corps.
- Lieutenant Colonel Christopher Sydney Faith, Royal Regiment of Artillery.
- Lieutenant Colonel Philip Austin Fitzgerald, T.D., Corps of Royal Electrical and Mechanical Engineers, Territorial Army.
- Lieutenant Colonel Royston Leslie Giles, M.B.E., The Gloucestershire Regiment.
- Lieutenant Colonel (now Acting Colonel) David Anthony Grove, Corps of Royal Engineers.
- Lieutenant Colonel (Quartermaster) Brian Henry Hayward-Cripps, Royal Tank Regiment.
- Lieutenant Colonel Michael Jerome Kelly, The Royal Regiment of Fusiliers.
- Lieutenant Colonel Paul Bruce Davenport Long, The Royal Anglian Regiment.
- Acting Colonel Colin Nicol Mearns, T.D., Army Cadet Force, Territorial Army (now retired).
- Lieutenant Colonel Euan Charles Wortham Morrison, The Royal Hussars (Prince of Wales's Own).
- Lieutenant Colonel Noel Muddiman, Royal Corps of Transport.
- Lieutenant Colonel (Quartermaster) Frederick Malcolm Orr, Royal Corps of Signals.
- Acting Lieutenant Colonel Geoffrey Ernest Pryke, Combined Cadet Force, Territorial Army.
- Lieutenant Colonel Anthony James Reed-Screen, Corps of Royal Engineers.
- Lieutenant Colonel (Director of Music) Richard Annison Ridings, Coldstream Guards.
- Lieutenant Colonel Anthony Peter Vernon Rogers, Army Legal Corps.
- Lieutenant Colonel Brian Justice Terry, Intelligence Corps.

Royal Air Force

- Wing Commander John Richard Davies.
- Wing Commander Peter Anthony Douty.
- Wing Commander Martin Lawrence Jackson.
- Wing Commander Anthony John Martin McKeon, A.F.C.
- Acting Wing Commander Stanley Mason, Royal Air Force Volunteer Reserve (Training).
- Wing Commander Timothy Wilfrid Negus.
- Wing Commander Daniel David Oxlee.
- Wing Commander Colin, Michael Quaife, M.B.E.
- Wing Commander (now Group Captain) Graeme Alan Robertson.
- Squadron Leader William Houldsworth, M.B.E.

Civil Division

- James Bryant Ackland, Architect, Bristol.
- Charles Geoffrey Adams, Senior Principal Scientific Officer, Department of Education and Science.
- William Aiken, Senior Principal, Department of Economic Development Northern Ireland.
- John David Anderson, Senior Principal, Ministry of Defence.
- Alan John Archer, Q.F.S.M., lately Chief Officer, Buckinghamshire Fire Brigade.
- Charles Reginald Atkinson, Director of Development Services, Bradford Metropolitan City Council.
- Reginald William Bailey, Chairman of Governors, Kingston Polytechnic.
- Thomas Roy Baker, Special Director, Aircraft and Control Engineering Division, Louis Newmark plc.
- Frederick William Ballard, Group Sales Director, Ransomes & Rapier Ltd. For services to Export.
- Nicolas Banister, M.B.E., Deputy Surveyor of the New Forest, Forestry Commission.
- Lawrence Henry Bannister, Chairman, Anglian Produce Ltd.
- Ernest Denis Barkway, Member, London Borough of Bromley.
- Alan Stanley Baxendale, lately Chief Education Officer, Home Office.
- Stanley Ernest Frank Beechey, lately Director and Assay Master, Birmingham Assay Office.
- David Wallace Bell, Director, Industrial Participation Association.
- Graham Murray Berrie, Technical Secretary, Council of the Scottish Agricultural Colleges.
- Captain George Frederic Matthew Best, R.N. (Retd.), lately Deputy Chairman, Wessex Water Authority.
- Douglas William Betts. For services to the magistracy in Nottingham.
- David Howard Blezard, Director, Continuing Education, Nelson and Colne College.
- Vera Gertrude, Mrs Booth, County Superintendent, South and West Yorkshire, St John Ambulance Brigade.
- Joyce Kathleen Mabel, Mrs Bowley. For political and public service.
- Alan Frederick Briscoe, Farmer, Berkswell, Warwickshire.
- Edward Maxfield Broome, County Librarian, Hertfordshire Library Service.
- Derek Joseph Buckley, lately Director, Scottish Ambulance Service.
- Robert Burns, Senior Principal, Department of Employment.
- Theodore Stanley Burrell, National Park Officer, Peak District National Park.
- Stephen Philip Byrne, City Planning Officer, Nottingham City Council.
- James Corrin Cain, lately Group Director, British Technology Group.
- Major Donald Fraser Callander, M.C. (Retd.), Public Relations and Appeals Director, Scottish National Institution for the War Blinded.
- Donald Bryce Carr, Secretary, Test and County Cricket Board.
- Richard Culling Carr-Gomm. For services to sheltered housing.
- Thomas Edward Carter, Director of Finance, Grampian Regional Council.
- Fred Theodore Chambers, Q.P.M., Deputy Chief Constable, Northumbria Police.
- Ms Dorothy Weedon Cherry, Principal, Overseas Development Administration.
- Jane Eleanor, Mrs Collier. For political and public service.
- John Robert Collingbourne, Senior Principal Scientific Officer, Department of Trade and Industry.
- Eric Raymond Cooke. For political and public service.
- Mrs Catherine Ann Cookson, Novelist.
- Major Terence Rex Corkery (Retd). For political and public service.
- Ewan Christian Brew Corlett, Chairman and Managing Director, Burness, Corlett and Partners Ltd.
- Noel Frederick Cox. For services to music.
- Geoffrey Arthur Cullington, M.C., Port Manager, Hull, Associated British Ports.
- Denis Herbert Cummings, Secretary, National Egg Marketing Association Ltd, British Eggs Ltd and Scottish Federation of Egg Packers.
- Miss Isobel Dover Curry, Regional Nurse, Capital Developments, North West Thames Regional Health Authority.
- Paul Mitchell Cutting, D.F.C., lately Administration Secretary, Royal Air Force Benevolent Fund.
- Ian Francis Dallison, Manager, Inland Transport, British Steel Corporation.
- Ronald Arthur Denney, Director, British School Technology.
- John Stanley Denton, lately Managing Director and Chief Executive, Nickerson Seed Company Ltd.
- Mervyn Frederick John Dobson, Singer.
- Douglas Peter Dodgson, Vice-Chairman, Northern Regional Health Authority.
- Miss Anne Margaret Donaldson, (Mrs MacTaggart), London Editor, Glasgow Herald.
- Anthony Leale Dorey, Technical Director, Vosper Thorneycroft (UK) Ltd.
- Mavis Mary, Mrs Doyle, Managing Director, UDEC Refrigeration Ltd. For services to Export.
- John English Q.P.M., lately Director/Chief Examiner of Central Planning; Instructor, Training and Police Promotion Examinations Unit, Pannal Ash, Harrogate.
- Evan Glyn Evans, T.D., Solicitor, Newport, Gwent
- Miss Elizabeth Ann Fanshawe, Director, Disabled Living Foundation.
- Ronald Fearn. For services to the community in Southport.
- Alan Coburn Ferguson, Director, Northern Ireland Association for Mental Health.
- Keith Thomas Flynn. For political and public service.
- Geoffrey Stuart Foster, lately Headmaster, The Towers School, Ashford, Kent.
- Charles John Desmond Fry, lately Company Secretary, Royal British Legion Attendants Company Limited.
- John Gamble, Director of Social Services, South Glamorgan.
- Norman Gelchrist, Production Director, Swan Hunter, British Shipbuilders.
- Lieutenant-Commander Louis Roland Goddard, R.N.R. (Retd), V.R.D., County Secretary, Hertfordshire, Soldiers', Sailors' and Airmen's Families Association.
- Miss Beryl Mary Goldsmith. For political service.
- The Reverend George Harold Good, M.B.E., Member, United Kingdom Social Security Advisory Committee.
- Derek John Goodwin, First Class Valuer, Board of Inland Revenue.
- Robert Gordon, lately Head of Administration, Royal Greenwich Observatory.
- Maurice Stephen Eliot Gould, Consultant Orthodontist, Eastman Dental Hospital, London.
- Allen Ernest Goulsbra. For political and public service.
- Brian Noel Green, Technical Director, VG Analytical Ltd.
- Norman Geoffrey Griffiths, Grade 6, Ministry of Defence.
- Muriel Gumbel. For political and public service.
- Edward Michael Hains. For services to the Road Haulage Association.
- William Douglas Hall, Keeper, Scottish National Gallery of Modern Art.
- John Keith Harwood, Vice President and Managing Director, R.H. Macy & Company Inc., Corporate Buying. For services to Export.
- William Geoffrey Haslam, D.F.C., Director, Prudential Corporation plc.
- Anthony James Darley Haswell, The Insurance Ombudsman.
- Joseph Conn Hawthorne, Manufacturing Director, Patons & Baldwins Ltd.
- Squadron Leader Dennis Edward Frank Hayter, R.A.F. (Retd.), lately Foreign and Commonwealth Office.
- Reginald Hems. For services to the Nuffield Department of Clinical Medicine, Medical Research Council.
- Frederic Henri Kay Henrion, M.B.E., Graphic Designer.
- Kenneth Hedley Holliday, Director of Engineering, Lucas Aerospace Ltd.
- Arthur Norman Hollis, D.F.C. For political and public service.
- Maurice Colston Holmes, Director of Operations, British Railways Board.
- Erie Hopwood, Senior Education Officer (Community Education, Youth and Careers), Essex County Council.
- Miss Barbara Nancy Hosking, Controller of Information Services, Independent Broadcasting Authority.
- Robert Howe, Senior Principal, Ministry of Defence.
- Yvonne Brenda, Mrs Jackson, D.L. For services to the community in West Yorkshire.
- Kenneth Gilbert Jessop, Managing Director, Stelmo Ltd. For services to Export.
- John Mill Nelson Johnstone, Employers' Secretary, Scottish Local Authorities Negotiating Bodies.
- David Gwyn Jones. For services to the British Standards Institute.
- John Gordon MacWilliam Kain, lately Director, British Retailers' Association.
- Leslie Ronald Kay, General Secretary, Universities Central Council on Admissions.
- Raymond Dennis Keene. For services to Chess.
- Miss Thea King (Mrs Thurston). Clarinettist.
- Peter Edward Lane. For services to the Oil Industry.
- Arthur Bruce Laurenson, General Manager, Lerwick Harbour Trust.
- Frank Ledger, Director of Operations, Central Electricity Generating Board.
- Max Lee, Establishment Officer, Metropolitan Police.
- James Patrick Oliver Lewis, Senior Principal, Board of Inland Revenue.
- Sampson Lifton. For services to Pain Relief Centre, Liverpool.
- Janet Elizabeth, Mrs Macgregor, Senior Lecturer, Department of Pathology, University of Aberdeen.
- The Right Reverend Monsignor Edward Mahony, Chairman, Southwark Roman Catholic Diocesan Schools' Commission.
- Rhea Sylvia Leslie, Mrs Martin, Vice-Chairman, National Association of Citizens' Advice Bureaux.
- Anthony Martinez, Chairman and Managing Director, Microvitec plc.
- Hubert Arbuckle Mason, Managing Director, Finlay Packaging plc.
- Derek Mate, lately Director, Operations, Teesside Works, British Steel Corporation.
- John Moil Mathieson, Provost, Perth and Kinross District Council.
- James Alexander McBride, Principal, Deramore School, Belfast.
- Alan Robert McCredie, lately Chief Accountant, Yorkshire Electricity Board.
- Captain Ronald Stewart McDonald (R.N.) (Retd.), House Governor and Medical Superintendent, Osborne House, Department of the Environment.
- Thomas Stewart Orr McGhee, Principal, Board of Customs and Excise.
- Margaret, Mrs McGregor, Member, North-Eastern Education and Library Board, Northern Ireland.
- Lieutenant Colonel William Alfred McLelland, T.D., D.L., lately Chairman, Gloucester County Council.
- John Ewen McNaughton, Chairman, Scotch Quality Beef and Lamb Association.
- Michael Meloy, Principal, Ministry of Defence.
- Gordon Michell, Architect, Michell and Partners.
- Ian David Miller. For political service.
- Donald Alfred Moody, Chairman, Moody Homes Ltd.
- Douglas Campbell Muirhead, Chairman, Ardrossan, Saltcoats and Stevenston Enterprise Trust.
- Peter Arthur Glanville Mullens. For services to the Welsh Industrial Development Advisory Board.
- William Edward Scott Mutch, Head, Department of Forestry and Natural Resources, University of Edinburgh.
- Alec Preston Nuttall, Chief Probation Officer, Cleveland Probation Service.
- Brigadier John Henry Huby Oliver, T.D., D.L., General Medical Practitioner, Worcestershire.
- Derek Armstrong Pattinson. For services to the community in Cumbria.
- Professor John Frederick Paynter, Professor of Music Education, University of York.
- Albert William Kenneth Penhaligon, Deputy Chairman, North Eastern Region, British Gas Corporation.
- Miss Margaret Pilbeam, Chief Nursing Officer, Eastbourne District Health Authority.
- Norman Platt, Artistic Director, Kent Opera.
- Stanley Please. For services to the World Bank.
- Mary Joy, Mrs Potts. For political and public service.
- David William Pye, Woodcarver.
- William Robert Rangeley. For services to international irrigation and drainage.
- James Humphrey Carr Rawson. For political and public service.
- James Walter Reed, Secretary, Dairy Produce Quota Tribunal for England and Wales.
- Richard Ivor Rees. For services to local government and the community in Dyfed.
- Alleyne Holden Reynolds, Managing Director and Consultant, BAT Industries (Small Business).
- Joseph Ogden Riley, Chairman, National Council, Royal Naval Association.
- Samuel Reid Campbell Ritchie, General Medical Practitioner, Northern Ireland.
- Shena, Mrs Robertson Cole, Chairman, Abbeyfield Governing Council, Scotland.
- Peter David Robeson. For services to Show Jumping.
- Valerie, Mrs Robinson. For services to Hockey.
- Edward Albert Rowe, Member, Lewisham and North Southwark District Health Authority.
- Maurice Frank Rowland, Consultant, Reginald W. Barker.
- Reuben Joseph Russell, Reservoir Evaluation Specialist III, Department of Energy.
- Peter William Russell-Eggitt, Chairman, Joint Scientific and Technical Committee, Food and Drink Federation.
- James Douglas Salmon, Managing Director, Crosfield Electronics Ltd.
- Frederic David Skidmore, Consultant, Joyce Green Hospital, Dartford.
- Margaret, Mrs Slade. For political service.
- Brian. Eugene Smith, lately Principal, Department for National Savings.
- Charles Leslie Smith, Principal Professional and Technology Officer, Department of the Environment
- Lieutenant Colonel John Norris Smith, T.D., D.L., Vice-Chairman, Wales, Territorial Auxiliary and Volunteer Reserve Association.
- Joyce Evelyn May, Mrs Smith, Chairman, Spastics Society.
- Professor John Crocket Smyth, Head of Department of Biology, Paisley College of Technology.
- Walter George Smyth, Sales Manager, Richardsons Fertilisers Ltd.
- Boleslaw Marian Sosin, Chief Scientist, Marconi Communications Systems Ltd.
- David Charles Stanley, Deputy Director of Education and Training, Confederation of British Industry.
- Stanley Steenson, Assistant Chief Constable, Royal Ulster Constabulary.
- Harold John Tamplin. For services to farming in Wales.
- Jennifer Anne, Mrs Taylor. For political service.
- Martin Thomas, D.L. For services to local government and the community in West Glamorgan.
- Gilbert Williamson Thompson, Chief Executive, Manchester International Airport.
- John Geoffrey Tristram, Baron Trevethin and Oaksey. For services to the Injured Jockeys Fund.
- William Mark Tully, Chief of Bureau, Delhi, British Broadcasting Corporation.
- Colin Veysey, lately Assistant County Surveyor, Hampshire County Council.
- William Proudfoot Walker, lately Member, Livingston Development Corporation.
- Frank Lystra Warner, Senior Principal Scientific Officer, Ministry of Defence.
- Alexander Stewart Weatherhead, T.D. For services to the legal profession in Scotland.
- Miss Joan Muriel Wheeler, Principal Nursing Officer, Department of Health and Social Security.
- Miss June Rosemary Whitfield (Mrs Aitchison), Actress.
- Thomas Jackson Whitson, Deputy Chief Constable, Central Scotland Police.
- Rowland James Williams. For services to Medicine in Wales.
- Katherine Muriel Irwin, Mrs Wilson, lately Chairman, Equal Opportunities Commission for Northern Ireland.
- Major Douglas Harold Witherington, lately Senior Veterinary Officer, The Jockey Club.
- Miss Mima Clark Woolley, Regional Nurse, North East Thames Regional Health Authority.
- Lois Mary, Mrs Yates, lately County Commissioner, Staffordshire, Girl Guides Association.
- Eric Herbert Bagge. For services to British commercial interests in Switzerland.
- Rodney Bedford. First Secretary (Commercial), British High Commission, Nicosia.
- Dr David Hamilton Black. For services to the development of animal husbandry in Costa Rica.
- Roger Bland, First Secretary, H.M. Embassy, Kuwait.
- Ronald George Blacker Bridge, Commissioner for Labour, Hong Kong.
- Robin John Burnett, Honorary British Consul, Belem, Brazil.
- Roy John Carter, M.B.E., First Secretary, British Deputy High Commission, Bombay.
- Cheung Yan-lung, M.B.E. For public services in Hong Kong.
- Shuk-yee, Mrs Chow Liang. For public services in Hong Kong.
- Dennis Henry Cooper, Deputy Consul-General, British Consulate-General, Chicago.
- Edmund Kirkland Cooper. For public services in Bermuda.
- Malcolm Lars Creek, L.V.O. First Secretary (Commercial), H.M. Embassy, Lima.
- Jean Ross, Mrs Farncomb. For services to Anglo-Australian relations in New South Wales.
- Maurice Kenneth Featherstone. For public services in Gibraltar.
- Michael Charles Gathercole, First Secretary (Administration), H.M. Embassy, Jedda.
- John Foster Green, Cultural Attaché (British Council), H.M. Embassy, Prague.
- Ralph John Griffiths, First Secretary, H.M. Embassy, Vatican City.
- Tony Harris. For services to civil engineering in the Peoples Democratic Republic of Yemen.
- Guy William Pullbrook Hart, First Secretary (Commercial), H.M. Embassy, Budapest.
- David Roy Howell, British Council Representative, New Zealand.
- Michael Alan Jervis. For services to British commercial interests in Tokyo.
- John Burnett McIntosh, M.B.E. For services to the development of the rubber industry in Liberia.
- Thomas George Mapplebeck. For services to British commercial interests in Egypt.
- Graham Eric Peter Ness, British Council Representative, Iraq.
- Ngai Shiu-kit. For public services in Hong Kong.
- Marjorie Constance Sarah, Mrs Rundle. For services to agriculture in Zambia.
- Colin Ogden Taylor. For services to the British community in Mexico.
- Geoffrey Edwin Frisby Taylor. For services to British commercial interests in Malaysia.
- Michael Wilson Clay Taylor. For services to the British community in Aqaba, Jordan.
- John Rawling Todd, C.V.O., Director of Lands, Hong Kong.
- Thomas Herbert Tomlinson, Director of Water Supplies, Hong Kong.
- Professor Derek Whittaker. For services to the development of engineering education in Zambia.
- Paul George William Winby. For services to British commercial interests in Belgium.
- Edric Rowland Worsnop, Deputy Consul-General, British Consulate-General, Melbourne.

State of Queensland

- Frederick Stanley Colliver. For services to Natural Sciences.
- John Angus Livingston. For services to the Sheep Breeding Industry.
- Miss Inara Monika Svalbe. For services to the Arts.
- Meta Talbot, Mrs Williams. For services to the community.

State of Tasmania

- Raymond Claude Bonney, M.H.A. For public service.

==== Member of the Order of the British Empire (MBE) ====
Military Division

- Lieutenant Commander Nigel Arthur Bruen, D.S.C., Royal Navy.
- Lieutenant Commander Stephen James Buck, Royal Navy.
- Lieutenant Commander Anthony Neil Dando, Royal Navy.
- Fleet Chief Air Engineering Artificer Gerald Alan Fitter.
- Fleet Chief Weapon Engineering Artificer Roy Hazeldine.
- Lieutenant Commander Timothy Ian Hildesley, Royal Navy.
- Lieutenant Commander Lawrence McAulay Jay, Royal Navy.
- Lieutenant Grenville Philip Johnson, Royal Navy.
- Lieutenant Commander Robert King, Royal Navy.
- Lieutenant Commander Brian Ross Knipe, Royal Navy.
- Lieutenant Commander Trevor Walter Ling, Royal Navy.
- Fleet Chief Petty Officer (OPS)(R) John Herbert Newing J856988H.
- Captain Keith William Edward Osborne, Royal Marines.
- Lieutenant (CS) Nicholas Toner, Royal Navy.
- Lieutenant Commander Ramon Anthony Waldock, Royal Navy.
- Major Hamish Maxwell Adams, Royal Corps of Signals.
- Acting Major Thomas Peter Aston, Army Cadet Force, Territorial Army.
- Major (Quartermaster) Ronald Charles Hugh Berry, The Light Infantry (now retired).
- Warrant Officer Class 1 Anthony George Bloor, Royal Pioneer Corps.
- Warrant Officer Class 2 Geoffrey Michael Bradley, Mercian Volunteers, Territorial Army.
- Captain Frederick Alder Calvert, T.D., The Royal Regiment of Fusiliers, Territorial Army.
- Major Edward Charles Digby Carter, Royal Regiment of Artillery.
- Major (Quartermaster) Norman Collins, Grenadier Guards.
- Major (Technical Instructor in Gunnery) Brian Patrick Concannon, Royal Regiment of Artillery.
- Acting Major Roy Currell, Army Cadet Force, Territorial Army.
- Major (Quartermaster) James Michael Patrick Dillon, The Prince of Wales's Own Regiment of Yorkshire.
- Captain (Quartermaster) John Andrew Fairhurst, The Queen's Lancashire Regiment.
- Major Martin Gerald Farnan, T.D., The Royal Irish Rangers (27th (Inniskilling) 83rd and 87th), Territorial Army.
- Major Anthony Frederick Edward Gaite, Royal Regiment of Artillery.
- Captain Claud Bayliss Genever, Royal Corps of Transport, Territorial Army.
- Major (Quartermaster) David Henry Greenfield, The Royal Anglian Regiment.
- Major Joseph Albert Harkon, T.D., The Parachute Regiment, Territorial Army.
- Captain (Quartermaster) Graham Peter Harris, Military Provost Staff Corps.
- Lieutenant Rodney George Hicks, The Duke of Edinburgh's Royal Regiment (Berkshire and Wiltshire).
- Captain (Quartermaster) David Hughes, The Duke of Wellington's Regiment (West Riding) (now RARO).
- Major John Christopher Morris Hughes, Army Air Corps.
- Warrant Officer Class 1 Douglas Sidney Hurd, Corps of Royal Electrical and Mechanical Engineers, Territorial Army.
- Major (Quartermaster) Peter Grant Jeffries, Royal Regiment of Artillery.
- Captain (Queen's Gurkha Officer) Jogindrasing Gurung, The Queen's Gurkha Engineers.
- Warrant Officer Class I George Joseph Kelly, Corps of Royal Engineers.
- Major John Evan Grant Lamond, 2nd King Edward VII's Own Gurkha Rifles (The Sirmoor Rifles) (now retired).
- Major Richard Clive Mantell, The Green Howards (Alexandra, Princess of Wales's Own Yorkshire Regiment).
- Captain (Quartermaster) Keith Melvyn Mannings, Royal Regiment of Artillery.
- Warrant Officer Class 2 Sarah Odell, Women's Royal Army Corps.
- Major John James Purves, 10th Princess Mary's Own Gurkha Rifles.
- Warrant Officer Class 2 John James Rudd, Royal Regiment of Artillery, Territorial Army.
- Warrant Officer Class 2 David Frederick Skinner, The Royal Regiment of Wales (24th/41st Foot).
- Major (Quartermaster) Albert Victor Smith, Coidstream Guards.
- Warrant Officer Class I Malcolm Eric Smith, Welsh Guards.
- Major Martin Nicholas Earle Speller, Royal Tank Regiment.
- Major David Kirwood Paige Steele, The Argyll and Sutherland Highlanders (Princess Louise's).
- Major (Quartermaster) William Jones Taylor, The Royal Green Jackets.
- Warrant Officer Class I David John Walker, Royal Corps of Signals.
- Warrant Officer Class I Thomas Emrys Walters, Welsh Guards.
- Major Ambrose Harry Warde, M.C., Royal Corps of Signals, Territorial Army (now retired).
- Warrant Officer Class 2 (Acting Warrant Officer Class 1) Alexander McGregor Wells M.M. Royal Corps of Signals.
- Warrant Officer Class 1 Laurence Wilding, The Royal Regiment of Wales (24th/41st Foot), Territorial Army.
- Squadron Leader Peter Charles Badcock, Royal Air Force.
- Squadron Leader Leslie George Buckingham, Royal Air Force.
- Squadron Leader Michael James Cockrill, Royal Air Force.
- Squadron Leader Derek Alwyn Exley, Royal Air Force.
- Squadron Leader Michael David Conrad Fonfe, Royal Air Force.
- Squadron Leader Robert Alexander Forrester, Royal Air Force.
- Squadron Leader William, Francis Joseph Holloway, Royal Air Force.
- Squadron Leader Idwal David Llewellyn Jones, Royal Air Force Volunteer Reserve (Training).
- Squadron Leader Philip John Rodgers, Royal Air Force.
- Squadron Leader Roland John Stuart Stokes, Royal Air Force.
- Squadron Leader John Stuart Winterbourne, A.F.C., Royal Air Force.
- Flight Lieutenant Timothy Almond, Royal Air Force.
- Flight Lieutenant Charles Albert Bailey, B.E.M., Royal Air Force.
- Right Lieutenant Michael John Daly, Royal Air Force.
- Flight Lieutenant Anthony Joseph Lark, Royal Air Force Volunteer Reserve (Training).
- Warrant Officer Brian Carl Marvin Baxter, Royal Air Force.
- Warrant Officer George James Thomas Bean, Royal Air Force.
- Warrant Officer Ian Alexander Robert Brown, Royal Air Force.
- Warrant Officer David Henry Bryan, Royal Air Force.
- Warrant Officer Brian Edward Chamberlain, B.E.M., Royal Air Force.
- Warrant Officer Rex Charles Farrington, Royal Air Force.
- Warrant Officer Terence Leslie Gilbert, Royal Air Force.
- Warrant Officer David William Highman, Royal Air Force.
- Warrant Officer Bernard Lawton, Royal Air Force.
- Warrant Officer Derek Edward Milner, Royal Air Force.
- Warrant Officer Jack Ambrose Eric Ransome, Royal Air Force.
- Warrant Officer Brian William Russell, Royal Air Force.

Civil Division

- Hylda May, Mrs Abell. For political and public service.
- John Victor Allard, Senior Executive Officer, Paymaster General's Office.
- Philip John Allery, Clerical Officer, Central Office of Information.
- Harry Anish. For political and public service.
- James Annandale, D.F.C., Counsellor, East Midlands Small Firms Counselling Service.
- Miss Judith Appleton, Nutritionist, Save The Children Fund.
- John Leslie Arthur, Senior Executive Officer, Agricultural and Food Research Council.
- Brenda Mary, Mrs Baker. For services to handicapped children in Cirencester.
- Miss Josephine Beatrice Balls. Chairman, Bradford on Avon Branch, Save The Children Fund.
- Alice Helen, Mrs Barnett. For political and public service.
- Mary Frances, Mrs Baxter, Group Secretary, East Dorset Group, Ramblers' Association.
- Donald Beaton. For services to the community in Oban.
- Leonard Beaumont, Factory Manager, Remploy, Hull.
- Martin Irvine Bell, Engineering Director, Barr & Stroud Ltd.
- David Bellamy, Senior Health Officer, Obstetrics and Gynaecology, Royal Sussex County Hospital.
- Alfred Edmeades Bestall, Illustrator.
- Douglas Ian Roy Bethell, Works Officer, Western Wessex, Territorial Auxiliary and Volunteer Reserve Association.
- Miss Yolande Bird, Assistant Secretary, National Theatre Board.
- Frederick Thomas Bishop, Station Officer, East Sussex Fire Brigade.
- Lieutenant Commander Harry Blease, R.N. (Retd.), lately Secretary, The Royal Navy and Royal Marine Children's Trust.
- David Alfred Chicheley Blunt, Lay Chaplain to the Archbishop of York.
- Edith Norah, Mrs Boddington. For services to the National Society for the Prevention of Cruelty to Children in the North West.
- George Derrick Bolsover, General Medical Practitioner, Eynsham, Oxfordshire.
- Richard Bond. For political and public service.
- Miss Kathleen Elsie Bonnett. For services to the blind.
- Leonard Boston, lately Member, Wakefield Family Practitioner Committee.
- Alec John Bowmaker, District Commissioner, Fareham, Scout Association.
- Miss Jean Francis Boxall, Nursing Officer, Royal Devon and Exeter Hospital.
- William John Boyd, Secretary and Treasurer, National Federation of Property Owners and Factors of Scotland.
- Arnold Bradley, Superintendent of Laboratories, Department of Physics, University of Sheffield.
- Miss Helen Brennan, Director of Nursing Services (Acute), Brighton Health Authority.
- John Brent-Jones, Professional and Technology Officer I, Ministry of Defence.
- Edward Briggs, Technical Support Manager, Hatfield Civil Division, Aircraft Group, British Aerospace.
- Brian Graham Brown, Prison Visitor, H.M. Prison, Dungavel.
- Gerald Montague Brown, lately Higher Executive Officer, Department of Employment.
- Jack Brown, General Secretary, Amalgamated Textile Workers' Union.
- Eric Villiers Browning, lately Civilian Operating Room Attendant, Ministry of Defence.
- Lilian Meiklejohn, Mrs Bruce, lately Principal Technical Officer, British Standards Institution.
- Miss Marjorie Bruce, lately Clerical Officer, Department of Employment.
- Miss Patricia Mary Bruce, Head of Tariff Section, Public Affairs Department, Imperial Chemical Industries.
- Reginald Mark Bush, Operations Director, Davy McKee (Poole) Ltd.
- John Patrick Byrne. For services to the Institution of Mechanical Engineers' Benevolent Fund.
- Vernon Ambrose Campden, Observer Commander, 24 Group, Royal Observer Corps, Edinburgh.
- Miss Jean Elsie Carder, Senior Executive Officer, H.M. Treasury.
- Sidney Solomon Caro. For political and public service.
- George Caskey, Superintendent, Royal Ulster Constabulary.
- William Steele Chambers, Governor Class IV, Northern Ireland Prison Service.
- John William Chandley, Tax Officer (Higher Grade), Board of Inland Revenue.
- Miss Sylvia Dorothy Clark, Foreign and Commonwealth Office.
- Colin Patrick Clarke. For services to the coal mining industry.
- Jennifer Ann, Mrs Clements, Graphic Officer II, Science Museum.
- John Arthur Coley. For services to Rotherham and District Allotments Societies.
- Rex Charles Colville, Terminal Duty Manager, Terminal 2, Heathrow Airport.
- Peter Raymond Cook, Senior Executive Officer, Science and Engineering Research Council.
- William Dennis Coombe, Headteacher, Spon Gate Primary School, Coventry.
- Patrick Paul Corcoran, Blending Plant Craftsman, Birkenhead Blending Plant, Mobil Oil Company Ltd.
- Betty Rose Irene, Mrs Cox, Clerical Officer, Ministry of Defence.
- Derek Linden Craven, Co-ordinator, "Enterprise North".
- Allan George Cronquist, Chief Research Officer, Clinical Research Centre, Medical Research Council.
- Norman George Crossley, County Commissioner, Lancashire Branch, St John Ambulance Brigade.
- Edward Thomas Curran, Operations Manager, Marconi Instruments Ltd.
- Robert Goodfellow Dakers Dalgleish, Engineering Designer, Ferranti plc.
- Miss Beatrice Irene Davies, Clerical Officer, Department of Transport.
- Harry Lonsdale Davies. For political and public service.
- Ivor Davies, Travelling Chief Inspector, Midlands Postal Board, Post Office.
- Mair Louvain, Mrs Davies, Specialist Health Visitor, Mid Glamorgan Health Authority.
- Miss Margaret Nesta Davies, Area Officer, South Wales, National Association of Citizens' Advice Bureaux.
- Thomas Malcolm Davies, Chief Technical Officer, Derwentside District Council.
- Roger Albert Davis, Deputy Clerk to the Justices, Medway Magistrates' Court.
- Miss Vivienne Davies, lately Head of Department of Adult Studies, Bracknell College of Further Education.
- Miss Sarah Elizabeth Dawson. For service to the education of adults especially in the field of lace making.
- Grace Effy Charlotte, Mrs De La Mare, Area Fire Control Officer, London Fire Brigade.
- Dirk De Neef, General Manager, Britoil plc.
- Patrick Joseph Devlin, Building Manager, West Belfast Maintenance Depot, Northern Ireland Housing Executive.
- Herbert Wesley Dickson, Higher Executive Officer, Board of Customs and Excise.
- Miss Iris Joyce Dismore, Senior Personal Secretary, Department of Employment.
- Winifred Margaret, Mrs Dodd. For services to handicapped people in Bath.
- Leo Donald Dolan, Chief Superintendent, Royal Ulster Constabulary.
- Thomas David Douglas, Senior Regional Officer, General Municipal, Boilermakers' and Allied Trades Union.
- Dudley George Dryden, Executive Member, Hackney Council for Racial Equality.
- Alexander Hutcheon Dunbar, lately Process Planner in Charge, Seaforth Engineering Ltd.
- Gwendoline Mary, Mrs Earp-Haward. For services to the community in Staffordshire.
- Douglas Edgar. For political and public service.
- Brendan Gerald Edwards. For services to the Irish Amateur Golf Team.
- Wilfred John Mills Edwards, Safety Education Officer, London Borough of Greenwich.
- Elsie Violet, Mrs Elliott, lately Chairman, League of Friends, Queen Mary's Hospital for Children, Carshalton.
- Kenneth Harold Ellis, Professional and Technology Officer I, Department of the Environment.
- Thomas Harold Ellis, National Treasurer, British Limbless Ex-Servicemen's Association.
- Robin Henry Elsender, Managing Director, Elsender Exports Ltd. For services to Export.
- George Eric Errington, Chief Project Manager, Bristol Division, Dynamics Group, British Aerospace plc.
- Norman William Henry Fairfax, Senior Executive Officer, Metropolitan Police.
- Gladys May, Mrs Farrington. For services to the community in Suffolk.
- John Patrick Thomas Foley, South Wales Divisional Officer, Iron and Steel Trades Confederation.
- William John Force. For political and public service.
- William Hylton Forrester, Inspector (S), Board of Inland Revenue.
- Miss Audrey Kathleen Foster, S.P.S., Rutherford Appleton Laboratory, National Institute for Research in Nuclear Science.
- John Romilly Fowler, Editor, Journal of Pharmacy and Pharmacology.
- Arthur Fowweather. For services to the community in Downpatrick, Co. Down.
- James Eckford Fyfe, lately Member, Argyll and Clyde Health Board.
- Eric Basil Gallagher, Regional Collector, Board of Inland Revenue.
- Sarah Doreen, Mrs Gaskell, Nursing Officer, Thornton Lodge Hospital, Northallerton Health Authority.
- Elizabeth Hendry, Mrs Gillies. For services to the community, particularly the elderly in Glasgow.
- Major David Rodney Goddard, Director, Exeter Maritime Museum.
- Miss Evelyn Mary Goodchild, Welfare Officer, The Motor and Cycle Trades Benevolent Fund.
- Frank William Goodsell, Senior Executive Officer, Department of Trade and Industry.
- Bernard William Goodyear, Director, South Buckinghamshire and East Berkshire Chamber of Commerce and Industry.
- Joseph Patrick Gorman, Works Manager, Sir Alfred McAlpine & Company.
- Lawrence Brendan Gormley, Principal Engineer (Transmission Maintenance and Construction), Northern Ireland Electricity Service.
- Grace Gertrude, Mrs Goy, Club Leader, St Thomas' Youth Club, Lambeth.
- James Gray. For services to the Royal Air Forces Association in Belfast.
- Joan, Mrs Green, lately Chairman, Northamptonshire County Council.
- David Ivor Griggs, Secretary, Textile Research Council.
- Richard Grove-Hills. For services to the Save The Children Fund particularly in Africa.
- Elsie, Mrs Haines, Secretary, Preston and District Branch, Arthritis and Rheumatism Council.
- Sybil Francesca, Mrs Hall. For services to the National Trust in Kent.
- Sheila Margaret Hilary, Mrs Hamill, Deputy Branch Director, Londonderry Branch, British Red Cross Society.
- Richard Sidney Hancock, Member, Chichester District Council.
- James Hankey. For political service.
- Joseph Moore Hardy, Regional Organiser, East Midland Branch, Union of Construction, Allied Trades and Technicians.
- Sidney Harrison. For services to musical education.
- George Lyndon Haworth, lately Group Engineer, Major Works, Essex County Council.
- William Harold Hazard, Head Office Keeper, House of Commons.
- Ronald Heavey, Headmaster, Mill House Special School for Handicapped Children, Newton-LeWillows, Lancashire.
- Herbert Nesbitt Heffernan. For services to community transport in Kent.
- Miss Elizabeth May Henderson. Higher Executive Officer, Board of Inland Revenue.
- Raymond George Hersey, Installation Engineer, Marconi Radar Systems Ltd. For services to Export.
- Anne Jessica, Mrs Hills, Chairman, National Association of Deaf-Blind and Rubella Handicapped.
- Clarence Frederick John Hocken, Secretary, Devon County Agricultural Association.
- Miss Ethel Hodgkinson, lately Director of Nurse Education, East Birmingham School of Nursing.
- William Alfred Holden, Higher Executive Officer, Department of Health and Social Security.
- Jane Hepburn, Mrs Holmes. For political and public service.
- Ellis George Horwood, Chairman, Ellis Horwood Ltd.
- Alexander Hosie, Chief Nursing Officer, State Hospital, Carstairs.
- Eleanor Grace, Mrs Hoskings, Chief Housing Manager, Crown Estate Office.
- Raymond Hubbuck, Tax Officer (Higher Grade), Board of Inland Revenue.
- Norman Hudson, Chairman, Bradford and Northern Housing Association.
- Margaret Elizabeth, Mrs Humphrey, Senior Staff Welfare Officer, Home Office.
- Miss Evelyn MacLennan Iles, Local Officer II, Department of Health and Social Security.
- Edward Alexander Ingram, General Medical Practitioner, Lerwick.
- James Andrew Jackson, Manager of Administration, Employee Relations Department, British Shipbuilders.
- Ronald Henry Jackson, Computer Aided Design Manager, Baker Perkins Ltd.
- Reginald Jenkyn, lately Principal Civil Engineering Assistant (Planning), London Regional Transport.
- Peter Somers Joce, Higher Executive Officer, Prime Minister's Office.
- Miss Carrie Johnson. For services to the community in Buxton, Derbyshire.
- James Sneddon Johnston. For services to industrial training in Ayrshire.
- Henry David Johnston Jones, lately Head of French Department, Llanidloes High School.
- William Cellan Jones. For political and public service.
- Francis Watson Kean, Secretary and Treasurer, Glasgow School of Art.
- Rosaline, Mrs Keys, Health Visitor, Londonderry.
- Marie Pauline, Mrs King, Deputy President, Avon Branch, British Red Cross Society.
- Derek Peter Lakin, Principal Architect, Director Technical Development, CLASP Development Group.
- Ronald Ernest Lee. For services to choral music in Northern Ireland.
- Charles Denis Lewis. For services to the Electricity Supply Pension Scheme.
- Bryan Link, Professional and Technology Officer II, Ministry of Defence.
- Edna Ashton, Mrs Lomax. For services to animal welfare in Faroworth, Bolton.
- Dorothy Joyce, Mrs Macdonald. For political and public service.
- Iain Alexander Macfarquhar, General Medical Practitioner, Elgin.
- Donald James Mackenzie, Chairman, Kincardine and Deeside District Council.
- Simon Maclachlan, lately Chairman, New Islington and Hackney Housing Association.
- Ian Archibald Macmillan, Veterinary Practitioner, Mauchline, Ayrshire.
- John Maloney, Executive Officer, H.M. Prison, Ford.
- Geoffrey Lindsey Manchester, Chairman, Humberside War Pensions Committee.
- Alan Gordon Marriott, Technical Director, British Paper and Board Industries Federation.
- Arthur Eric Marshall. For political service.
- Cecil Albert Henry Johnston Martin, Chairman, Belfast Savings Council.
- Joan, Mrs Martin, Clinical Medical Officer, Kensington and Chelsea.
- Reginald John Martin, Secretary, Sulgrave Manor Board.
- Raymond Thomas Mastel, Higher Executive Officer, Board of Customs and Excise.
- Alastair McAllister, Higher Executive Officer, Department of Health and Social Security.
- Nancy, Mrs McCall, Director of Nursing Services Midwifery Division, Bolton Health Authority.
- Elizabeth, Mrs McCartney, Supervisor, Ballymena Health Centre, Co. Antrim.
- Major Herbert Terence McCormack, (Retd.), Retired Officer II, Ministry of Defence.
- George McDowell, Staff Welfare Officer, Department of Health and Social Security.
- Desmond John McGlynn. For services to young people.
- Captain Angus McKenzie, Master, Ben Line (Wm. Thomson & Co.).
- William Borrie McLeod. For services to sport for the disabled.
- Michael Martin McNamara, Group Manager, Services, Southern Water Authority.
- Daniel George McPherson, Technical Manager, Hull, Yarrow Shipbuilders Ltd.
- Richard McTaggart. For services to Amateur Boxing in Scotland.
- Margaret Landale, Mrs Mercer, Curator, Fife Folk Museum, Ceres.
- Catherine Gillian, Ms. Meredith, Director, Cooperative Development Services, Liverpool.
- Dermot George Deacon Meredith. For political and public service.
- Miss Dorothea Evelyn Merrick, Higher Executive Officer, Welsh Office.
- Norman Metcalfe, Professional and Technology Officer I, Ministry of Defence.
- William Metcalfe, Member, North York Moors National Park Committee.
- Douglas Mill, Chief Instructor (Technical), St Loye's Training College for the Disabled, Exeter.
- Miss Meryl Ann Millington, Executive Officer/ Secretary, Office of Fair Trading.
- Derek Roy Mills, lately County Careers Officer, Cheshire.
- Miss Helen Lowry Mitchell, Divisional Administrative Officer, Police Authority for Northern Ireland.
- James Struthers Mitchell, lately Clerical Officer, Department of Employment.
- Betty Lydia Chetwynd, Mrs Moira, Member, Advisory Committee on Scotland's Travelling People.
- Thomas Ieuan Morgan. For services to Brass Band music in Wales.
- Alan John George Morley. For services to Rugby Football.
- Evelyn Violet, Mrs Morris, County Organiser, Gloucestershire, Women's Royal Voluntary Service.
- Miss Jean Mostyn Owen, Pedigree Goat Breeder, Minskip, North Yorkshire.
- Commander Nicholas Marwood Mules, D.S.C., R.N. (Retd.), Chief Executive, Poole Harbour Commissioners.
- Sidney Arthur Muntz, Chairman and Joint Managing Director, S. Murray and Co. Ltd., and George Gill and Sons (Sheffield) Ltd.
- Edward Hector Murray, Commercial Director, Cochrane & Johnson Ltd.
- Braham Jacob Myers. For services to the British Limbless Ex-Servicemen's Association in Bradford and Leeds.
- Nina, Mrs Nathan. For services to the Abbeyfield Society.
- James Nimmo, Managing Director, Ideal Timber Products Ltd.
- Raymond Arthur Nunn, lately Chief Officer, Shropshire Rural Community Council.
- Miss Hazel Robina Ogg, Higher Executive Officer, Scottish Office.
- Joseph Roy Ottey, lately General Secretary, Power Group, National Union of Mineworkers.
- Peter Arthur Palmer, Principal Legal Executive, Prosecutions Branch, Essex County Council.
- John Neale Pargeter, lately Associate Sports Editor, The Journal (Newcastle).
- Ernest Parker, County Secretary, Lancashire, National Farmers' Union.
- Thomas George Parry. For services to the community in Clwyd.
- Walter John Passmore, Chairman. Policy and Resources Committee, Borough of West Devon.
- Arthur Frank Payne, Member, South West Water Authority.
- Miss Flora Sutherland Peacock, Deputy Regional Director, British Council, West of Scotland.
- Mary Hope, Mrs Pedder, lately Chairman, League of Friends, Lynton Cottage Hospital.
- Violet May, Mrs Perchard. For political and public service.
- Miss Kathleen May Petrie, Librarian in Charge, Hitchin Library.
- Richard Maldwyn Phillips, Higher Executive Officer, Department of Employment.
- Laurence Arthur Pike, General Medical Practitioner, Birmingham.
- Edward James Piper, lately Manager, Central Quality Assurance, Thorn EMI Electronics Ltd.
- Ronald George Piper, Collector (Higher Grade), Board of Inland Revenue.
- Frank Raymond Platts. For services to the agricultural industry.
- Miss Kathleen Nora Plowman, Higher Executive Officer, Ministry of Defence.
- Richard Graham Powell, Group Controller, Bedford Group, United Kingdom Warning and Monitoring Organisation.
- Alexander Maxton Prince, Higher Executive Officer, Department of Employment.
- Joseph Patrick Prunty, Managing Director, Prunty Contracts Ltd.
- Derek Arthur William Pullen, Professional and Technology Officer II, Harwell, United Kingdom Atomic Energy Authority.
- Michael John Quinn, lately Head Chef, The Ritz Hotel, London.
- John Owen Victor Rafferty. Senior Community Relations Officer, Hammersmith and Fulham Council for Racial Equality.
- David Lawrie Raffle, Chief Aerodynamicist, Weybridge Division, Aircraft Group, British Aerospace plc.
- William John Henshaw Randells, Secretary, Hinckley and District Knitting Industries Association.
- Kenneth Ratcliffe, lately Factory Manager, Remploy, Portsmouth.
- Raymond Reardon. For services to Snooker.
- Betty Gwendolen, Mrs Reed. Executive Officer, Ministry of Agriculture, Fisheries and Food.
- Samuel Reed, Area Manager, Derby, London Midland Region, British Railways.
- Margaret Eirwen, Mrs Richards. Member, Transport Users' Consultative Committee for Wales.
- Mark Trevor Roberts, Headmaster, Rectory Paddock Special School, Bromley.
- Thomas Alexander MacGregor Robertson, Chairman, Edinburgh Executive Committee, St Andrew's Ambulance Association.
- George Robinson, lately Professional and Technology Officer I, Department of the Environment for Northern Ireland.
- Miss Sarah Elizabeth Robinson, District Physiotherapist, East Belfast and Castlereagh, Eastern Health and Social Services Board.
- Miss Josephine Winifred Rogers, Director of Nursing Services (Community), West Portsmouth and South East Hampshire Health Authority.
- Miss Mary Rose Lethbridge Rogers, Clerk, College of Arms.
- William George Roper, Chief Superintendent, West Yorkshire Metropolitan Police.
- Marjorie Milsom, Mrs Rose, Secretary, Redcar and Catterick Racecourses.
- Eric Ross, Administrative Officer, Technical Directorate, Scottish Special Housing Association.
- Thomas Boyd Rossborough, lately Assistant Town Clerk, Belfast City Council.
- Ronald Charles Russell. For services to Shooting.
- William Salter, Materials Engineer, Buckinghamshire County Council.
- Charles Neil Sharp, lately Chairman, Bruce Lindsay Group.
- Norma, Mrs Shaw. For services to Bowls.
- Robert Joseph Shipman, Principal Officer, Greenlea Home for the Elderly, Edinburgh.
- Esther, Mrs Silverman. Chairman, Kidney Research Aid Fund.
- Arthur Jerstice Simm, lately Director, General Products, Moulding and Primary Processing, BTR Industries.
- Derek Simpson, lately Clyde Area Manager, South of Scotland Electricity Board, Glasgow.
- The Reverend Donald Maclean Skinner. For services to Youth in Gilmertan.
- John Smith, Superintendent, Merseyside Police.
- Valerie Irene, Mrs Smith, Inspector of Taxes, Board of Inland Revenue.
- Walter Henry Smith. For services to the Royal British Legion in the West Midlands.
- Hugh David Spencely, Architect; Chairman. Centre on Environment for the Handicapped.
- Ronald Emrys Spencer, G.M., Civilian Welfare Officer, Gloucestershire Constabulary.
- Miss Edith Josephine Stanley. For services to the Blind in Cheshire.
- William Robert Steele, Depot Manager, Ulsterbus Ltd.
- Miss Stella Victoria Stewart, lately Ward Sister, Horton General Hospital, Oxford Health Authority.
- William Grant McDonald Stewart, lately Station Officer, Tayside Fire Brigade.
- Jack Stokes, Project Director, John Laing Construction.
- Eric Straw, Area Manager, Worksop, Eastern Region, British Railways.
- Alan Stringer. Principal Trumpet, Royal Liverpool Philharmonic Orchestra.
- Thomas Geoffrey Sutcliffe, Telecommunications Technical Officer I, Ministry of Defence.
- Alan Taylor, Director, North Eastern Fanners Ltd.
- Brian Frederick Thomas, Senior Executive Officer, Lord Chancellor's Department.
- Miss Celia Marjorie Thomas. For political service.
- David Myrddin Thomas. For services to farming and the local community in Dyfed.
- Evan Rees Thomas. For services to farming in Wales.
- Margaret Jean, Mrs Thomas. For services to the community in Dyfed.
- Marcus Asplin Thompson, Disaster Officer, Oxfam.
- William Henry Thompson. For services to Rugby League Football.
- William Gerald Thorpe. For political service.
- Margaret Sheila, Mrs Timmins, Ward Sister, Rampton (Special) Hospital, Department of Health and Social Security.
- Leonard Jose Tipper. For services to the National Boat Shows Ltd.
- Mark Frederick Tollit, Chairman and Managing Director, Tollit & Harvey Ltd.
- Alfred Eric Tomlinson. For services to Youth in Bingley, West Yorkshire.
- Sidney Torch. For services to Light Music.
- Margaret Shirley, Mrs Towner, Senior Housing Officer, Greater London Council.
- Michael Liam Trotman, Chief Superintendent, Metropolitan Police.
- Miss Eva Kathleen Turner, Executive Officer, Department of Health and Social Security.
- John Alan Usmar, Director, Devon Community Council.
- Neville Anthony Verrinder, Director of Economics and Finance, British Wool Marketing Board.
- Frank Waldie, Chairman, Axwell Park School Foundation.
- John Walkerdine, Chairman, William Walkerdine Ltd.
- Roger Kenneth Walsome, Engineering Shift Supervisor, Terminal 2, Heathrow Airport.
- Miss Margaret Amy Walton, Community Midwife, Maidstone, Kent.
- Albert Watson, Higher Executive Officer, Department of Health and Social Security.
- John Greer Watson, Member, Transport Users' Consultative Committee for Scotland.
- James Oswald Webster, Chief Forester, Forestry Commission.
- Stephen Henry Sidney Westgate, Principal Building Surveyor, Commission for the New Towns.
- David William White. For services to the Boys' Brigade.
- Charles Edward Whitfield. For services to the Wine Standards Board.
- William Gordon Whittington, General Manager, Miles Laboratories (Bridgend) Inc.
- John Gerrard Wildman, Divisional Director, Neath Industrial Components.
- Bunty Doreen Edith, Mrs Willard-Burrows, Director, Derby Playhouse Ltd.
- Amos David George Williams, Employee Director, British Steel Corporation Strip Mill Products.
- Agnes Emmerson, Mrs Willoughby. For political and public service.
- Frederick Henry Charles Wills, President, Poole and District Fishermen's Association.
- William James Wilson, Chief Superintendent, Royal Ulster Constabulary.
- Miss Jennifer Joan Wiltshire, Headteacher, Chelsea Open Air Nursery School.
- Maureen Phyllis, Mrs Wood, Local Officer I, Department of Health and Social Security.
- Maurice Howard Wright, Shipping Manager, Glaxo Export Ltd.
- Ralph Wright, Chief Commandant, Bedfordshire Special Constabulary.
- Miss Eileen York, lately Nursing Officer, Derby City Hospital, South Derbyshire.
- Doreen May, Mrs Young. For political service.
- Arthur John Abbas, Principal Land Executive, Hong Kong.
- Miss Margaret Ethel Binns. For nursing services to the community in Mombasa, Kenya.
- John William Cuthbert Blok, Vice-Consul, British Consulate-General, Amsterdam.
- James Ashmead Bodden. For public and community services in the Cayman Islands.
- Marcia Emily, Mrs Bodden, Collector of Customs, Cayman Islands.
- Chann Yau-fong, Senior Liaison Officer, Hong Kong Government Office, London.
- Miss Joan Evelyn Sarah Clent. For nursing services to the community in Gabon.
- Simon James Davey, H.M. Consul, British Consulate, Durban.
- Miss Doris May Davis, Senior Finance Officer, Ministry of Finance, Zambia.
- Irene Violet, Mrs Davis. For services to the British community in Tenerife.
- Patricia, Mrs Deane-Gray. For services to ballet in Bermuda.
- Frederick George Richard Diment. For services to English teaching in Benin.
- Miss Jean Dugmore, Personal Assistant to H.M. Ambassador, Dublin.
- Stanley Reid Dunkerley. For services to British shipping interests in Liberia,
- John Owen Edwards. For services to ex-prisoners of war in Hong Kong.
- Joan Felicia, Mrs El Itriby, Nursing Sister, H.M. Embassy, Cairo.
- Thomas Henry Fallon. For services to exservicemen in Dublin.
- Peter Fraser. For services to education in Ankara.
- Miss Rosemary Margaret Greenfield, Commercial Registrar, H.M. Embassy, Lisbon.
- Barbara Gunson, Mrs Higgins. For services to the British community in Houston, Texas.
- Vanier Menes Hodge, Director of Information and Broadcasting, Anguilla.
- Colin James Howett. For services to the British community in Antwerp.
- Miss Olwen Jones, Personal Assistant to H.M. Ambassador, Baghdad.
- Stanley Kwan Shi-kuang. For public services in Hong Kong.
- John Douglas Lambert. For services as Royal Navy Liaison Officer, Freeport, Bahamas.
- John Alfred Kennedy Laws. For services to the British community in Japan.
- Isabelle Mary Mrs Lecourt-Lory, Deputy Librarian, British Council, Paris.
- Dr William John Campbell MacArthur. For medical services to the community in the British Virgin Islands.
- Carol Jane Mrs McPhillips. For services to the British community in Dhahran, Saudi Arabia.
- Guiyot Mrs Marc, Honorary British Vice-Consul, Sarnos, Greece.
- Verna Ernestine Mrs Penn Moll, Chief Librarian, British Virgin Islands.
- Jacqueline Mary Ellen Christine Mrs Montagu. For services to the British community in Cannes.
- Ng Shue-chiu. For community services in Hong Kong.
- Clifford Henry Partridge, Administration Officer, British Trade Commission, Hong Kong.
- Miss Sheila Mary Price. For nursing services to the community in Egypt.
- Miss Margaret Prior, lately Registrar, British Information Services, New York.
- Monica Mary Eileen Leta Mrs Rankin. For services to the British community in Portugal.
- Andrew Cameron Rennie, Chief Superintendent, Royal Hong Kong Police Force.
- Gerald Edward Schultz, Technical Works Officer, British High Commission, Ottawa.
- Gordon Charles Sharp. For services to British commercial interests in Jordan.
- Jessie Stuart Mrs Shellim. For welfare services to the community in Bombay.
- Barbara Jill Mrs Simpson. For nursing and welfare services to the community in Kenya.
- John Robert Tilleard. For services to Anglo-Dutch relations in Amsterdam.
- Benjamin Walter Verge Tomsett, Consul (Commercial), British Consulate-General, Marseilles.
- Tong Yuk-lun, Controller of Government supplies, Hong Kong.
- Joseph Charles Warne, Administrative Officer, Public Works Department, Gibraltar.
- Geoffrey Bertram Woolrych. For services to the British community in Copenhagen.
- Robert Joseph Worrall. For services to electrical engineering development in Swaziland.

State of Queensland

- Thomas Arthur Hacker. For services to the Sheep Breeding Industry.
- Hazel Audrey, Mrs Huston. For services to the community.
- Douglas Dunmore Lang. For services to the community.
- George Edward Menge. For services to the Volunteer Coast Guard.
- Mervyn Roy Stubbins. For public service.
- Dorothy Harriet, Mrs Wadley. For services to the community.
- Janet May Florence, Mrs Yates. For services to ex-Service personnel and to the community.

State of Tasmania

- Ernest William Barwick. For services to sport.
- Dr John Craze Henry Morris. For services to medicine and to the community.

=== Imperial Service Order ===
- Terence Barrett, Superintending Engineer, Department of Transport.
- Miss Una Daphne Ruth Brown, Principal, Department of Employment.
- Dennis Wilfred Edward Carless, Principal, Ministry of Defence.
- William Henry Cooper, Senior Principal, Department of Transport.
- Denis John Enright, Principal, Department of Trade and Industry.
- Miss Muriel Clare Gillen, Principal Officer, Department of Health and Social Services, Northern Ireland.
- George Eric Harrison, Vice Principal, Civil Defence College, Home Office.
- David Smith Horn, Inspector (SP), Board of Inland Revenue.
- Miss Betty Mary Jones, Principal, Board of Customs and Excise.
- Noel Stanley Jones, Principal, Welsh Office.
- Horace Herbert Knight, Principal, Department of Trade and Industry.
- Michael George Kyffin, Foreign and Commonwealth Office.
- Claude Handley Leonard, Principal Professional and Technology Officer, Ministry of Defence. Edward David Fleming McGaughrin, Principal, Industry Department for Scotland.
- Raymond Myers, lately Chief Property Adviser, Public Trustee Office.
- Kenneth Ronald Norris, Principal Professional and Technology Officer, Ministry of Defence.
- Alan William Halliday Pearsall, Curator Grade C, Head of Historical Section, National Maritime Museum.
- David Wallace Penman, lately Principal Collector, Board of Inland Revenue.
- Robert Hughes Pritchard, Principal, Department of Health and Social Security.
- Denis William Shephard, Inspector (SP), Board of Inland Revenue.
- Frank Ronald Smith, Principal Professional and Technology Officer, Ministry of Defence.
- George Robertson Todd, Principal Professional and Technology Officer, Department of the Environment.
- Dennis Victor Upton, Principal, Department of Health and Social Security.
- Peter Frederick Leeds, Commissioner for Transport, Hong Kong.
- Gordon Louis Mortimer, Commissioner for Narcotics, Hong Kong.

State of Queensland

- Jack Tunstall Woods. For public service.

State of Tasmania

- Dr George Mackay-Smith, Director-General of Health Services Tasmania.

=== British Empire Medal ===
Military Division

- Colour Sergeant Andrew James Baker, Royal Marines.
- Chief Petty Officer Stores Accountant Neville Leslie James Beeby.
- Chief Marine Engineering Mechanic (Mechanical) David Michael Craven.
- Chief Petty Officer Medical Assistant Peter Donald Emmins.
- Chief Petty Officer (Operations) (Sonar) Trevor Lawrence Fox.
- Chief Petty Officer (Operations) (Missile) Peter Gordon Gale.
- Chief Communications Yeoman Charles Leslie Gilbert.
- Chief Petty Officer (Seaman) Ferguson Hamilton.
- Chief Petty Officer Cook James William Harris.
- Chief Petty Officer (Coxswain) (Submarines) Raymond Harrison.
- Chief Marine Engineering Mechanic (Mechanical) Alan John Hodges.
- Chief Petty Officer Writer David Hughes.
- Chief Petty Officer Writer David Christopher Jenkins.
- Chief Petty Officer Writer (CA) Thomas Henry Moreton.
- Chief Petty Officer (Operations) (Electronic Warfare) Peter Stuart Morton.
- Colour Sergeant James Ross Murray, Royal Marines.
- Chief Marine Engineering Mechanic (Mechanical) Roger George Perry.
- Chief Petty Officer Marine Engineering Artificer (Mechanical) Michael John Rooney.
- Chief Communications Yeoman (CA) Patrick Clinton Sharkey.
- Chief Radio Supervisor William Eric Sherman.
- Chief Marine Engineering Mechanic (Mechanical) Colin James Tuck.
- Staff Sergeant Alastair John Baily, Corps of Royal Engineers.
- Sergeant James Baird, Royal Army Medical Corps, Territorial Army.
- Sergeant James Carson Boyd, The Royal Irish Rangers (27th (Inniskilling) 83rd and 87th), Territorial Army.
- Staff Sergeant Thomas Arthur Bufton, Corps of Royal Engineers.
- Staff Sergeant Raymond Frank Butters, Army Physical Training Corps.
- Staff Sergeant Kenneth Carmichael, Royal Corps of Transport, Territorial Army.
- Corporal of Horse Paul Russell Chant, The Life Guards.
- Staff Sergeant Brian Charles Cook, Royal Regiment of Artillery, Territorial Army.
- Staff Sergeant Martin John Davis, Royal Corps of Signals.
- Staff Corporal (Acting Warrant Officer Class 2) Gordon Roy Digney, The Life Guards.
- Corporal David John Dobson, Corps of Royal Engineers.
- Staff Sergeant Alexander Ross Clark Douglas, Corps of Royal Electrical and Mechanical Engineers.
- Staff Sergeant Ian Watson Douglas, Corps of Royal Engineers.
- Staff Sergeant (now Warrant Officer Class 2) Graham Frederick Dyer, Intelligence Corps.
- Staff Sergeant Michael George Eady, Royal Corps of Signals,
- Sergeant John William Edge, 17th/21st Lancers.
- Staff Sergeant Alan Robert Egginton, The Queen's Lancashire Regiment.
- Sergeant Michael Arthur Fossey, Royal Corps of Transport
- Lance Bombardier Ronald William Freeman, Royal Regiment of Artillery, Territorial Army.
- Sergeant Betty Mary Fry, Women's Royal Army Corps.
- Corporal Fergus Joseph Godley, Corps of Royal Military Police.
- Bombardier Desmond Fitzherbert Goodman, Royal Regiment of Artillery.
- Staff Sergeant Roberta Ivy Grant, Women's Royal Army Corps.
- Lance Corporal (Acting Corporal) Martin John Hosker, Army Air Corps.
- Sergeant Chi-Wei Hsu, Royal Hong Kong Regiment (The Volunteers).
- Staff Sergeant (now Acting Warrant Officer Class 2) Allan Dennis James, Royal Army Medical Corps.
- Staff Sergeant John Keohane, Royal Corps of Signals.
- Sergeant Helen Jean Kettles, Women's Royal Army Corps.
- Corporal John Roland King, Corps of Royal Electrical and Mechanical Engineers.
- Sergeant (Acting Staff Sergeant) Gwenda Mary Latus, Women's Royal Army Corps.
- Corporal Alan Lees, Mercian Volunteers, Territorial Army.
- Staff Sergeant George Robertson Low, Royal Corps of Transport.
- Sergeant Michael Alan Lowrie, Royal Army Ordnance Corps.
- Staff Sergeant Owen John McGuinness, Royal Corps of Signals.
- Staff Sergeant Philip Middlehurst, Corps of Royal Engineers.
- Staff Sergeant (Acting Warrant Officer Class 2) Ronald Alexander Jarvie Moffat, Royal Army Ordnance Corps.
- Sergeant Philip John Mowlam, Army Catering Corps.
- Staff Sergeant John Murray, Royal Corps of Signals.
- Staff Sergeant (Acting Warrant Officer Class 2) William Charles Ould, Royal Army Ordnance Corps.
- Staff Sergeant Alan Owen, Royal Army Ordnance Corps.
- Staff Sergeant Robin Wilfred Painter, The Royal Hussars (Prince of Wales's Own).
- Sergeant Michael David Parry, Royal Pioneer Corps.
- Corporal Gary Dale Petty, Royal Corps of Transport.
- Corporal (Acting Sergeant) Ronald Edward Potter, Royal Corps of Signals.
- Corporal William Matthew John Prendergast, Royal Corps of Transport.
- Staff Sergeant Paul Joe Presland, Army Air Corps.
- Sergeant Peter Raymond David Reed, Corps of Royal Engineers.
- Corporal Kenneth David Rodger, Corps of Royal Military Police.
- Staff Sergeant Philip Richard Rumsey, Royal Corps of Signals.
- Staff Sergeant (now Acting Warrant Officer Class 2) John Salmons, Corps of Royal Military Police.
- Corporal Jeremiah Maitland Adrian Scott, 5th Royal Inniskilling Dragoon Guards.
- Sergeant David George Scrivens, The Royal Hampshire Regiment.
- Staff Sergeant Keith Seddon, The Worcestershire and Sherwood Foresters Regiment (29th/45th Foot).
- Staff Sergeant Douglas Albert Sellers, Royal Corps of Transport.
- Sergeant Derek Hugh Sheath, Royal Regiment of Artillery, Territorial Army.
- Staff Sergeant Peter Harry Simpkins, Q.G.M., Royal Tank Regiment.
- Sergeant Edna Patricia Sisseam, Women's Royal Army Corps, Territorial Army.
- Sergeant Royden Ephraim Skyrme, Royal Army Ordnance Corps (now discharged).
- Staff Sergeant Eric James Smith, Scots Guards.
- Sergeant Geoffrey Edward Smith, Army Catering Corps.
- Sergeant (Acting Staff Sergeant) John Smith, The Royal Scots (The Royal Regiment).
- Corporal Andrew Mark Snaith, Royal Corps of Signals.
- Corporal William Cyril Sutton, Royal Army Ordnance Corps (now discharged).
- Sergeant David Gordon Taylor, Royal Corps of Transport.
- Sergeant Robert Leslie Tough, Royal Regiment of Artillery.
- Sergeant (Acting Staff Sergeant) Stephen Clifford Turner, Royal Army Ordnance Corps.
- Corporal Sheldon Wild, 14th/20th King's Hussars.
- Sergeant Andrew Wilson, Officers Training Corps, Territorial Army.
- Staff Sergeant Robert Easson Wilson, Royal Corps of Transport, Territorial Army.
- Corporal Michael Frank Wright, The Royal Anglian Regiment, Territorial Army.
- Flight Sergeant John Young Binnie, Royal Air Force.
- Flight Sergeant Michael John Brown, Royal Air Force.
- Flight Sergeant Brian Edward Clarke, Royal Air Force.
- Flight Sergeant Albert Grainger, Royal Air Force.
- Flight Sergeant Frederick James, Royal Air Force.
- Flight Sergeant Fook-Wing Lau, Royal Hong Kong Auxiliary Air Force.
- Flight Sergeant Derek William Moscrop, Royal Air Force.
- Flight Sergeant Roger Frederick Pilon, R.V.M., Royal Air Force.
- Flight Sergeant Alexander Rennie, Royal Air Force.
- Flight Sergeant Gerald Arthur Spencer, Royal Air Force.
- Flight Sergeant Ian David Thornton, Royal Air Force.
- Flight Sergeant Peter Llewellyn Wilton, Royal Air Force.
- Chief Technician Christopher Brown, Royal Air Force.
- Chief Technician (now Flight Sergeant) William John Coutts, Royal Air Force.
- Chief Technician Lyn Wilkinson, Royal Air Force.
- Sergeant David John Kemp, Royal Air Force.
- Sergeant (now Flight-Sergeant) David Agnew Milligan, Royal Air Force.
- Sergeant Joseph Small, Royal Air Force.
- Sergeant Peter Adrian Vann, Royal Air Force.
- Sergeant David Wilkie, Royal Air Force.
- Corporal Ashok Raiya Ramji Ladva, Royal Air Force.

Civil Division
United Kingdom

- Leslie George Amies, lately Chief Steward II, Ministry of Defence.
- Kenneth William Anderson, Regimental Sergeant Major, Caithness Company, Army Cadet Force.
- Ernest William Arthur. For services to Boatbuilding in the Thames Valley.
- Marie Therese Philippine Gustave, Mrs Audenaerdt, lately Foreign and Commonwealth Office.
- Frank Montague Bailey, Professional and Technology Officer III, Ministry of Defence.
- Herbert Ernest Bamforth, lately Sergeant, South Yorkshire Police.
- Richard Cooper Banbury, Constable, Nottinghamshire Constabulary.
- Edward George Barrett, Engine Tester, Petters Ltd.
- Miss Thelma Kate Barrett, Cook-in-charge, Southery County Primary School, Norfolk.
- Arthur Bates, Supervisor, Experimental Department, Martin-Baker Aircraft Company Ltd.
- Alexander Beattie, lately Engineering Foreman, Ulsterbus Ltd.
- Matthew Beith, Chargehand, Department of the Environment.
- Doreen, Mrs Benson, Meals on Wheels Organiser, Bacup, Women's Royal Voluntary Service.
- William Bevon, Millwright, Patricroft, Royal Ordnance plc.
- Dorothy, Mrs Bibby, Premises Organiser, Essex, Women's Royal Voluntary Service.
- Maude Primrose, Mrs Blake, Catering Manageress 'C', Metropolitan Police.
- Frederick Bond, Senior Technical Instructor, Warton Division, Aircraft Group, British Aerospace plc.
- Alfred Albert Bonfield, Experimental Worker Grade 1, Warren Spring Laboratory.
- Jane Brunton, Mrs Brannan, Housekeeper, Official Residence of the Secretary of State for Scotland.
- Tressie, Mrs Bregze, Head Waitress/Licensed Hall Supervisor, Rotherham Metropolitan Borough Council.
- Miss Doris Bridges. For services to the community, particularly the elderly in Beaconsfield.
- Henry Nieholls Briggs, Professional and Technology Officer III, Ministry of Defence.
- Rodney Norman Brompton, Sergeant, North Yorkshire Police.
- Beattie, Mrs Brooks. For services to the community in Penzance and district.
- Adam Stevens Brown, Fireman, Ministry of Defence.
- Marjorie, Mrs Brown, Embroiderer . For services particularly to churches in Humberside.
- Robert Brown, Foreman Mechanic (Maintenance), Sidlaw Group plc.
- Daniel Harold Bryant, Constable, Devon and Cornwall Constabulary.
- George Henry Burrows, Head Gardener, Dunham Massey, Cheshire. The National Trust.
- Robert Campbell, Farm Grieve, Edinburgh School of Agriculture.
- Raymond Cantrill, lately Roof Support Fitter, Bentinck Colliery, South Nottinghamshire Area, National Coal Board.
- Sidney Roy Carter, First Aid Room Attendant, Robertsbridge Works, British Gypsum Ltd.
- Jack Champion, lately Huntsman, Old Surrey and Barstow Hunt.
- Mary Ravenhill, Mrs, Chapman, Old People's Welfare Organiser, Cornwall, Women's Royal Voluntary Service.
- William Edward Joseph Chapple. For services to the community in Plymouth.
- Andrew Watson Chicken, lately Sergeant, Norfhumbria Police.
- Reginald Hatherley Clarke, Gauge Examiner, Morganite Special Carbons Ltd.
- Ida Margaret, Mrs Clist. For services to the Capricorn Youth Club, Aldershot
- Gladys Ellen, Mrs Cook. For services to the community in Keyingham, North Humberside.
- Leonard Copcutt, Clerk of Works, Buckinghamshire County Council.
- Joseph Copestick, Chargehand Welder I, West Midlands Region, British Gas Corporation.
- Eric Bocking Copley, Electrician, Engineering Workshops, Stocksbridge Works, British Steel Corporation.
- Flora Ellen Grace, Mrs Cox, Senior Storekeeper, Ministry of Defence.
- Frieda Christina Ann, Mrs Cox, Divisional Superintendent, Highworth Quadrilateral Division, Wiltshire, St John Ambulance Brigade.
- William Frederick Craddock, Surgical Shoemaker, M.J.C. Peacock and Son, Newcastle upon Tyne.
- Thomas Joseph Dalmedo, Messenger, Ministry of Defence.
- John Elwyn James Davies. For services to Agriculture and the community in Dyfed.
- Margaret, Mrs Davies, District Organiser, Swansea, Women's Royal Voluntary Service.
- Phyllis Maud, Mrs Davies. For services to the Disabled Workers' Shop, Bristol.
- John Kenneth Dean, lately Sergeant Major Instructor, Staffordshire and West Midland (North Sector), Army Cadet Force.
- Andrew Dickson Deans, Head Gardener, Kirklands Hospital, Lanarkshire Area Health Authority.
- John William Dent, Surface Superintendent, Shirebrook Colliery, North Derbyshire Area, National Coal Board.
- George Allan Dillow, General Fitter, Ministry of Defence.
- James Thomas Dix, Chief Officer I, H.M. Prison, Wormwood Scrubs.
- Robert Dunsmore, Telephonist, H.M. Prison, Barlinnie.
- Gerald John Charles Elkins, Constable, Dorset Police.
- Kenneth Ellinor, Supervising Instructional Officer II, Ministry of Defence.
- Bryan Timothy Ellwood, Constable, Cumbria Constabulary.
- Eric Reginald Emery, lately Range Warden, Yoxter Range Camp, Western Wessex, Territorial Auxiliary and Volunteer Reserve Association.
- Leslie Alfred Ferry, Chairman's Waiter, Lloyd's.
- Edith Margaret, Mrs Forde. For services to the Social Work Department, Royal Surrey County Hospital.
- Alan Fox, Section Leader, Mechanical Inspection, Marconi Command and Control System.
- John Francis, Organist, Nutfield Parish Church.
- Ronald Frederick French, Driver, Southern Region, British Railways.
- Alexander Frost, Chief Steward, Travellers-Fare, British Railways.
- William Fulton. For services to cycling and athletics in Ayrshire.
- David Galbraith, Constable, Strathclyde Police.
- John Richard Gascoigne, Warden, Seven Sisters County Park, East Sussex.
- John Gaston, Constable, Royal Ulster Constabulary.
- James Gill, Chargehand Supervisor, Dundee, Remploy Ltd.
- Leslie George Giltnane, Industrial Monocaster, H.M. Stationery Office.
- Victor Ernest Glover, Production Superintendent, GEC Mechanical Handling Ltd.
- Joyce Marguerite, Mrs Goddard, Caseworker, Hertfordshire Branch, Soldiers' Sailors' and Airmen's Families Association.
- Gordon Thomas Edward Gowers, Chief Observer, No. 4 Group Colchester, Royal Observer Corps.
- Ronald Greene, Senior Foreman, London Electricity Board.
- Arthur Grundy, lately Joiner, W. Calvert and Company Ltd.
- Francis John Hagen, Senior Janitor, Glasgow College of Food Technology.
- Anthony Kenneth Douglas Hamilton, Engineer, Arran War Memorial Hospital, Ayrshire and Arran Health Board.
- George Hampson, Vice-Chairman, Hyde Lads' Club, Cheshire.
- Miss Ruth Margaret Harrison, Head Cheesemaker, Hinton Bank Farm, Whitchurch.
- Glenys Anne, Mrs Hay, Observer, 13 Group, St Twynells, Royal Observer Corps.
- James Patrick Hayes, Chief Supervisor of Government Telephonists, Ministry of Defence.
- Reginald Arthur Hoar, Professional and Technology Officer IV, Ministry of Defence.
- Margaret Agnes, Mrs Hogg, lately Storekeeper, Freshwater Biological Association, Natural Environment Research Council.
- Grace Elsie, Mrs Hope. For services to the Royal Manchester Children's Hospital.
- Harry Hotston, Sub Officer, London Fire Brigade.
- Leonard Charles Richard Housden, Building Foreman, North Bedfordshire Health Authority.
- John Hucker, Bus Driver, Midland Fox Ltd.
- Albert John Dawson Hutchinson, Constable, Belfast Harbour Police Service.
- Herbert James Inglis, Professional and Technology Officer III, Scottish Development Department.
- Harry William Izzard, Storeman (Non-Craft Industrial), Harwell, Atomic Energy Research Establishment.
- John Jackson, Constable, Royal Ulster Constabulary.
- Stanley Jagger, Bus and Coach Driver, West Yorkshire Passenger Transport Executive.
- Tom Jarratt, Ambulance Member, Wellington Combined Division, Somerset, St John Ambulance Brigade.
- Thomas Bert Jeans, Professional and Technology Officer III, Department of the Environment.
- Frederick Charles Jones, Civilian Clerk C4A, Ministry of Defence.
- Trevor Gwynfi Jones, Service Engineer, Dowty Group plc. For services to Export.
- Barry Keane, Leading Fireman, London Fire Brigade.
- Harry Kelshaw, Motor Driver, Freightliners Ltd, British Railways.
- Arthur Leonard Kilner, lately Sergeant, Metropolitan Police.
- Arthur Kingsbury. For services to the Royal British Legion in Virginia Water, Surrey.
- Edward Kirby, Overhead Line Foreman, North Eastern Electricity Board.
- Albert Edwin Lancaster, Machine Tool Fitter, A. A. Jones and Shipman plc.
- Julian Dennett Lawrence, Apprentice Training Officer, Hatfield Division, British Aerospace plc.
- Harold Reginald Leakey. For services to the community in Farrnborough, Avon.
- Joyce Florence, Mrs Carter-Leay, Office Keeper Grade 1, Home Office.
- Walter Leggett, Senior Technician, Norwich Telephone Area, British Telecommunications plc.
- Michael Francis Leneghan, Coxswain, Newcastle (County Down) Lifeboat, Royal National Lifeboat Institution.
- Eileen Muriel, Mrs Leonard, Telephonist, Metropolitan Police.
- David Marwick Leslie, Principal Lightkeeper, Pentland Skerries, Northern Lighthouse Board.
- Kenneth Francis Lewis, Shift Chargehand Electrician, Springfields Works, British Nuclear Fuels plc.
- Charles Lister, Secretary, Ashington Branch, Coldstream Guards Association.
- Charles Henry Lister, Distribution Supervisor, Ward Blenkinsop and Co.
- Stanley Frederick Lowry, Process and General Supervisory B, Ministry of Defence.
- Henry Lucy, lately Highway Supervisor I, Department of the Environment, Northern Ireland.
- Joseph Everton Lyttle, Head Porter and Mace Bearer, University of Ulster.
- Neil Scally Maccallum, Postman, Campbeltown Sub Office, Oban, The Post Office. William James McCulloch, lately Head Janitor, Kirkcudbright Academy.
- Ronald Norman McCullough, Messenger, Department of the Environment, Northern Ireland.
- Mary Clare, Mrs McDonald. For services to the community in Downpatrick, Co. Down.
- John McFarland, Sergeant, Royal Ulster Constabulary.
- John McGonigle, Head Porter, Mid Ulster Hospital, Magherafelt, County Londonderry.
- John McKenna, Subpostmaster, London N.17, The Post Office.
- William Christopher McKenna, District Inspector, Cleansing Department, Down District Council. James McLean, Tack Welder, Cumbria, British Steel Corporation.
- John McLean, Senior Officer, Northern Ireland Prison Service.
- Margaret Ann, Mrs Maclean. For services to the community in Dingwall, Ross-shire.
- Patrick Maguire, Professional and Technology Officer III, Department of the Environment, Northern Ireland.
- Winifred Elsie, Mrs Major, Head Custodian, Department of the Environment.
- Frank Andrew Malt, Artificial Limb Fitter, J. E.
- Hanger and Company Ltd.
- Donald Manson, lately Manager, Aero Department, Bruntons (Musselburgh) plc.
- Charles Henry Valentine Marchant, Sub-postmaster, Sutton Valence, Maidstone, The Post Office.
- Gordon Massey, Lift Attendant, Department of the Environment.
- Peter Masters, Toolmaker, IMI Precision Diecastings plc.
- Cecil Wylie Maxwell, Postal Executive D5, Downpatrick, Belfast HPO, Northern Ireland Postal Board, The Post Office.
- Donald Edgar Milliner, Chargehand/Operator, Motney Hill Sewage Treatment Works, Southern Water Authority.
- Arthur Edward Mitchell, Foreign and Commonwealth Office.
- Stanley Monaghan, Farm Foreman, Kenyon Hall Farm, Croft, Cheshire.
- Walter Morris, Overman, Littleton Colliery, Western Area, National Coal Board.
- Evelyn Maud, Mrs Morson. For services to the community in Builth Wells, Powys.
- Patrick Goodwyn Nicholas Murphy, Principal Keeper, Lynmouth Foreland, Trinity House.
- Brian Thomas Murray, Ambulanceman, Brighton Station, South-East Thames Regional Health Authority.
- Louis William Murray, Constable, Grampian Police.
- David William Mussett, Retained Sub Officer, Essex Fire Brigade.
- Florence Elizabeth, Mrs Myatt, lately Catering Assistant, University of Sheffield.
- Frederick Arthur Nye, Chief Photoprinter, Department of Health and Social Security.
- Harold Edwin Nye, Sergeant, Winfrith, United Kingdom Atomic Energy Authority Constabulary.
- Margaret Isabel, Mrs Oakes, Member, Trafford, Women's Royal Voluntary Service.
- Terence Oglethorpe, Constable, Metropolitan Police.
- John Paterson Ogston, Constable, Humberside Police.
- Henry O'Hara, Chief Instructor, Inverclyde, British Shipbuilders Training Workshop.
- William Carmichael Paterson, Fitter, Walter Alexander and Company (Coachbuilders) Ltd., Falkirk.
- John Frederick Pearce, Professional and Technology Officer III, Ministry of Defence.
- Leonard Arthur Pitts, Agricultural Worker, E. W. Pepper Ltd. (Fanners), Hertfordshire.
- John Kitchener Platt. For services to the community in Leicester.
- Alexander Towns Potter, Constable, Kent Constabulary.
- Alfred Henry Prentice, Medical Photographer, Institute of Neurology National Hospital for Nervous Diseases.
- Ralph Ralph, Supervising Instructional Officer I, Ministry of Defence.
- William Ramshaw, Senior Clerk of Works, Mott Hay and Anderson.
- Peggy Jose, Mrs Reed, Supervisor, Headquarters Telephone Exchange, British Railways Board.
- Lilian Olive, Mrs Rice. For services to the community in Tintinhull, Somerset.
- John Bramley Richardson, Fitter, Leeds, Royal Ordnance plc.
- Sylvia, Mrs Ridgeway, Chief Naval Auxiliaryman, Falmouth, Royal Naval Auxiliary Service.
- Donald Robertshaw, Bus Driver, West Yorkshire Passenger Transport Executive.
- George Robertson, Professional and Technology Officer III, Department of Transport
- Denis Ryan, Chief Officer I, H.M. Prison, Wakefield.
- Hamish Sharp, Foreman Warehouseman, Connal and Company, Perthshire.
- Dennis Graham Sherratt, Propagating Superintendent, Congleton Borough Council.
- Thelma May, Mrs Shilling. For services to the South Warwickshire Group Homes Association.
- Stanley Simpson, Chief Petty Officer, Wallsend Unit, Sea Cadet Corps.
- Beatrice Mary, Mrs Slater, Member, Matlock, Women's Royal Voluntary Service.
- Frederick Lyndon George Smith, Foreman (Mains), South Wales Electricity Board.
- George Ernest Smith, lately Security Guard, Terminal 2, Heathrow Airport.
- Gordon Herbert Smith, Sub Officer, Bedfordshire Fire Brigade.
- John Smith, Coxswain, Thames Water Authority.
- John William Smith, Process and General Supervisory C, Ministry of Defence.
- Henry Robert Snelgar, Chief Estimator, A H Moody and Son Ltd.
- Leonard Charles Softley, M.M. For services to the- disabled in Northamptonshire.
- Joseph Somakian, Range Warden Chargehand, Ministry of Defence.
- Thomas George Spillane, Traffic Controller, Swansea, Associated British Ports.
- James Tanners, lately Messenger (Chargehand), National Engineering Laboratory.
- Ernest Storr, lately Constable, Greater Manchester Police.
- Ernest James Strike, Chargehand Storekeeper, Truro, South Western Region, British Gas Corporation.
- John Gilbert Stubberfield, Station Supervisor, Southern Region, British Railways.
- Douglas Ivor Sutton. For services to the disabled in Rhondda.
- George Stanley Swainston, Manager, Central Messing Store, Catterick Garrison, Navy, Army and Air Force Institutes.
- Alice Annie, Mrs Taylor, School Crossing Patrol, Metropolitan Police.
- Leonard Cherrett Taylor, Constable, Metropolitan Police.
- Miss Patricia Amelia Taylor, Assistant Chief Photoprinter, Home Office.
- Stanley Broadbent Taylor. For services to the community in West Yorkshire.
- Norman Huxley Thacker. For services to the Scout Association.
- Hugh Richard Williams Thain, Professional and Technology Officer III, Ministry of Defence.
- David Alfred Thoday, Leading Observer, No. 7 Group, Bedford, Royal Observer Corps.
- Albert Victor Thompson, Book-keeper, National Council for Voluntary Organisations.
- Stanley Augustus Tinklin, Driver, Western Region, British Railways.
- Mansel Tolley, Technician 2A, Wales and the Marches Region, British Telecommunications plc.
- George Trotter, lately Technician Grade I, Napier College of Commerce and Technology, Edinburgh.
- William Oliver Turnbull, Revenue Assistant, Board of Customs and Excise.
- Charles Leslie Turner, Subpostmaster, Lye, Stourbridge, Dudley HPO Area, Midlands Postal Board, The Post Office.
- Douglas James Wagg, Shop Manager, Ward Barracks, Bulford Camp, Navy, Army and Air Force Institutes.
- Richard Hogg Walker, Chauffeur to Chairman, Northumberland County Council.
- Cyril William Watkins, Installation Inspector, Midlands Electricity Board.
- John Gilbey Watkins, Instructional Officer Grade III, Department of Employment.
- John Charles Westlake. For services to the Chesterfield Hospital, Derbyshire.
- Mabel Annie, Mrs Wheatley. For services to the Child Health Clinic, Ellesmere Port.
- Henry Whyte, Sergeant, Warwickshire Constabulary.
- Leonard Arthur Wilkes. For services to the Scout Association.
- Elsie Edith, Mrs Woolston. For services to the community in Bedford.
- Laura Ida, Mrs Wright. For services to the community in Surrey.
- Roger Thomas Wright. For services to the community in Crediton, Devon.

Overseas Territories

- Miss Zoe Emily Bodden, Chief Airport Officer, Cayman Islands.
- Albert Edward Langston. For public and community services in Gibraltar.
- Lee Cheung-fai, Chief Customs Officer, Customs and Excise Service, Hong Kong.
- Li Chung, Office Assistant, Survey Department, Hong Kong.
- Lok Ho-sum, Principal Survey Officer, Buildings Ordinance Office, Hong Kong.
- Miss Aysha Moosdeen, Personal Assistant to Commissioner ICAC, Hong Kong.
- Ng Tsui, Mrs Kit-ming, Group Supervisor, Auxiliary Medical Services, Hong Kong.
- Sinn Kwok-bun, Inspector, Transport Department, Hong Kong.
- Samuel Tobelem, Warden, Jewish Home, Gibraltar.

State of Queensland

- Lorna Isabel, Mrs Church. For services to the community.
- Edward Vincent McDonnell. For services to the community.
- Francis Bernard McGreevy, M.M. For services to ex-Servicemen and Women.
- Rita Ethel, Mrs Murray. For services to the community.
- Edith Lily, Mrs Newnham. For services to the community.
- Douglas Nothdurft, Superintendent of Police, Queensland Police Force.
- Miss Dorothy O'Brien. For services to the community.
- Leonard Oliver. For services to the community.
- Alexander Jack Oxenford. For services to the community.
- Miss Avis Elaine Taylor. For services to the community.
- Dorothy Alice, Mrs Templeton. For services to the community.

State of Tasmania

- Robert John Dudman. For services to the community.
- Lily May, Mrs Parsell. For services to the community.
- Eileen Mary, Mrs Pease. For services to the community.

=== Royal Red Cross ===
==== Member of the Royal Red Cross (RRC) ====
- Lieutenant Colonel Bridget Tasker, Queen Alexandra's Royal Army Nursing Corps.
- Lieutenant Colonel Joan Margaret Elizabeth Thompson, Queen Alexandra's Royal Army Nursing Corps, Territorial Army.

==== Associate of the Royal Red Cross (ARRC) ====
- Superintending Nursing Officer Susan Alfreds Clements, Queen Alexandra's Royal Naval Nursing Service.
- Chief Medical Technician (Nursing) Trevor Oldroyd.
- Major John Henry Trevor Howes, Royal Army Medical Corps, Territorial Army.
- Major Esme Barbara Teresa Sweeney, Queen Alexandra's Royal Army Nursing Corps.
- Flight Lieutenant. Ruth Bleasdale, Princess Mary's Royal Air Force Nursing Service.
- Sergeant Graham John Holmes, Princess Mary's Royal Air Force Nursing Service.

=== Air Force Cross (AFC) ===
- Lieutenant Commander David Roy George, Royal Navy.
- Lieutenant Commander Anthony George Rogers, Royal Navy.
- Warrant Officer Class 2 John Malcolm Kendrick, Army Air Corps (now discharged).
- Major (Technical Aviation Instructor) Alan George Wiles, Army Air Corps.
- Wing Commander Robert McCluskey, Royal Air Force.
- Squadron Leader Peter Dunlop, Royal Air Force.
- Squadron Leader Simon Glyn Lloyd-Morrison, Royal Air Force.
- Squadron Leader Alastair William MacMaster Taggart, Royal Air Force.
- Flight Lieutenant Robert Marston, Royal Air Force.

=== Queen's Police Medal for Distinguished Service (QPM) ===
England and Wales

- Thomas Allen Conchar, Chief Constable, Cheshire Constabulary.
- Howard William Crabtree, lately Superintendent, Nottingham Constabulary.
- Kenneth John Evans, Assistant Chief Constable, West Midlands Police.
- Frederick Hickman, Chief Superintendent, West Mercia Constabulary.
- George Elliott Howlett, Commander, Metropolitan Police.
- Trefor Alfred Morris, Chief Constable, Hertfordshire Constabulary.
- Anthony John Newman, Commander, Metropolitan Police.
- Albert Howard Pacey, Deputy Chief Constable, Lancashire Constabulary.
- James Alfred Powell, Chief Superintendent, Warwickshire Constabulary.
- Miss Rona Mary Price, lately Superintendent, South Wales Constabulary.
- Geoffrey Windsor Pye, Assistant Chief Constable, Merseyside Police.
- David John Shattock, Deputy Chief Constable, Dyfed-Powys Police.
- Colin Bertie John Sutton, Assistant Commissioner, Metropolitan Police.
- Donald Wilfred Waite, Chief Superintendent, Avon and Somerset Constabulary.
- Donald Harvey Williams, Commander, Metropolitan Police.

Northern Ireland

- Stewart Reilly, Sergeant, Royal Ulster Constabulary.
- William Bruce Tosh, Inspector, Royal Ulster Constabulary.

Hong Kong

- Robert Lewis John Macdonald, Chief Superintendent, Royal Hong Kong Police Force.
- Brian Webster, Assistant Commissioner, Royal Hong Kong Police Force.

State of Queensland

- Donald John Braithwaite, Assistant Commissioner of Police, Queensland Police Force.

Scotland

- William Masson Adams, M.B.E., Deputy Chief Constable, Grampian Police.
- William McMaster, Assistant Chief Constable, Strathclyde Police.

=== Queen's Fire Service Medal for Distinguished Service ===
England and Wales

- Sidney Keith Livermore, Divisional Officer 1, Norfolk Fire Service.
- Peter Reid, Chief Officer, Staffordshire Fire Brigade.
- John Anthony Robinson, Chief Officer, Cornwall Fire Brigade.
- Leslie Gordon Treliving, Assistant Chief Officer, London Fire Brigade.
- James Roy Watson, Chief Officer, Lancashire Fire Brigade.
- Robert Gordon Wilson, Chief Officer, Gloucestershire Fire and Rescue Service.

Northern Ireland

- Kenneth McNeill, Assistant Chief Fire Officer, Fire Authority for Northern Ireland.

Scotland

- John Thomson, Firemaster, Fife Fire and Rescue Service.

=== Colonial Police Medal for Meritorious Service ===
- Chung Chi-kin, Station Sergeant, Royal Hong Kong Police Force.
- Stanley Ernest Dirkin, Chief Inspector, Royal Hong Kong Police Force.
- James Kenneth Ewan, Senior Superintendent, Royal Hong Kong Police Force.
- Timothy Antony Fitzpatrick, Senior Superintendent, Royal Hong Kong Police Force.
- Ian Lavis Griffiths, Senior Superintendent, Royal Hong Kong Police Force.
- Michael John. Harris, Senior Superintendent, Royal Hong Kong Police Force.
- Arthur William Higginbottom, Senior Superintendent, Royal Hong Kong Police Force.
- Ho Sum, Principal Fireman, Hong Kong Fire Services.
- Lee Kwong-yee, Senior Superintendent, Royal Hong Kong Police Force.
- Lee Wang-on, Senior Divisional Officer, Hong Kong Fire Services.
- Leung, Fook-sin, Principal Fireman, Hong Kong Fire Services.
- James Souter Main, Chief Superintendent, Royal Hong Kong Police Force.
- Ng Ka-wing, Sergeant, Royal Hong Kong Police Force.
- Ivan Cyril Scott, Superintendent, Royal Hong Kong Police Force.
- Tai Chun-Iau, Divisional Officer, Hong Kong Fire
- John Anthony Wilkinson, Superintendent, Royal Hong Kong Police Force.
- Yeung Chi-keung, Station Sergeant, Royal Hong Kong Police Force.

=== Queen's Commendation for Valuable Service in the Air ===
- Warrant Officer Class 2 Erik Anderson, Army Air Corps.

== Cook Islands ==
=== Order of the British Empire ===
==== Member of the Order of the British Empire (MBE) ====
Civil Division

- Hauanui George Faimau Robati. For services to the community.

=== British Empire Medal (BEM) ===
Civil Division

- Mrs Maui Timata Short. For services to the community.
