= List of honorary fellows of Girton College, Cambridge =

- Mary Arden, Lady Arden of Heswall
- Dame Frances Ashcroft
- Dame Madeleine Atkins
- Margaret Bent
- Dame Gillian Beer
- Dame Ann Bowtell
- Margaret Burbidge
- David Conner
- Anita Desai
- Dame Athene Donald
- Lady English
- Dame Elizabeth Forgan
- Dame Elizabeth Gloster
- Dame Rosalyn Higgins
- Hisako, Princess Takamado
- Patricia Hollis, Baroness Hollis of Heigham
- Elizabeth Llewellyn-Smith
- Rachel Lomax
- James Mackay, Baron Mackay of Clashfern
- Margrethe II of Denmark
- Dusa McDuff
- Douglass North
- Dame Bridget Ogilvie
- Pauline Perry, Baroness Perry of Southwark
- Viscountess Runciman of Doxford
- Sarah Springman
- Elizabeth Symons, Baroness Symons of Vernham Dean
- Daphne Todd
- Dame Margaret Turner-Warwick
