= Lord Thomas =

Lord Thomas may refer to:

- Miles Thomas, Baron Thomas (1897–1980), peer and aviation executive
- John Thomas, Baron Thomas of Cwmgiedd (born 1947), British judge
- Martin Thomas, Baron Thomas of Gresford (born 1937), Liberal Democrat peer, lawyer and former Deputy High Court judge
- Peter Thomas, Baron Thomas of Gwydir (1920-2008), Conservative politician
- Terence Thomas, Baron Thomas of Macclesfield (1937–2018) Labour Co-op peer and retired banker
- Hugh Thomas, Baron Thomas of Swynnerton (1931–2017), Crossbench peer, historian and former diplomat

== See also ==
- Susan Thomas, Baroness Thomas of Walliswood (born 1935)
- Celia Thomas, Baroness Thomas of Winchester (born 1945)
- Dafydd Elis-Thomas (Baron Elis-Thomas) (born 1946)
