= John Shakespeare (diplomat) =

British diplomat

John William Richmond Shakespeare, CMG, LVO (born 11 June 1930) is a British retired diplomat.

Shakespeare was born in Simla, India, the only son of Major W. G. Shakespeare, who was in charge of the British Military Hospital there. From 1935 to 1937 the family lived in Peking, where Major Shakespeare was medical officer to the Legation Garrison. In 1937 they moved to Hong Kong, where his father was in charge of the British Military Hospital. He attended the Peak School, of which he is the oldest surviving alumnus.

From 1943 to 1948 he was at Winchester College in the UK, and from 1949 to 1950 he was a second lieutenant in the Irish Guards. He graduated from Trinity College, Oxford, where he read Modern Languages, in 1953. After a year lecturing in English at the École Normale Supérieure in Paris, he joined the editorial staff of the Times Educational Supplement, and in 1956 he became a member of the editorial staff of The Times.

- In 1959 he was Private Secretary to Sir Gladwyn Jebb, the British ambassador in Paris. On 22 September 1960 he was appointed a member of the Foreign Service in Paris, and in August 1961 he was transferred to the Foreign and Commonwealth Office in London. In 1963, he was promoted to First Secretary.
- From 1966 to 1969, he was Information Officer in Rio de Janeiro. He was awarded the Order of the Southern Cross.
- From 1973 to 1976 he was Counsellor and Consul General in Buenos Aires.
- On 26 January 1976 Derick Ashe terminated his duty as ambassador in Buenos Aires and JWR Shakespeare stayed as chargé d'affaires until 1977.
- From 1979 to 1983, he was Deputy Head of Mission in Lisbon, and Chargé d'affaires during the Falklands War of 1982. He was Chairman of the Anglo-Portuguese Society from 1981 to 1984.

From 1983 to 1987 he was ambassador in Lima. He was Vice-President of the Anglo-Peruvian Society from 1991.

- From 1987 to 1990 he was ambassador in Rabat. He was awarded the Alouite Order by King Hassan II.
- From 1991, he was Chairman of the Morgan Grenfell (later Deutsche Bank) Latin American Trust.
- From 1991, he was Latin American consultant for Clyde & Co.
- 1985 Birthday Honours he became Companion of the Order of St Michael and St George.
