= Barbara Hosking =

British broadcaster (1926–2021)

Barbara Nancy Hosking, CBE, FRSA, FRTS (4 November 1926 – 21 March 2021) was a British broadcaster and civil servant.

== Early life ==
Hosking was born in Penzance on 4 November 1926, the daughter of William Henry Hosking and his wife Ada Kathleen, née Murrish. She was educated at West Cornwall School for Girls and Hillcroft College in Surbiton. She has described her childhood as "miserable", especially after her disciplinarian father's dairy business went bankrupt during the Great Depression; her parents' marriage was also unhappy, with Hosking suspecting her father was adulterous.

== Career ==
Hosking began her career in broadcasting as a local correspondent for the BBC and the Western Morning News between 1945 and 1947. She then worked as an Editorial Assistant for The Circle, Odeon and Gaumont cinemas until 1950. Between 1952 and 1955, she worked for the Labour Party as an assistant information officer and then spent two years as the General Manager's assistant at a Tanzanian copper mining company. She then worked in the Broadcasting Section of Labour Party until 1965 and then in press officer posts in the Civil Service until 1977, during which time she served as an aide to the Prime Ministers Harold Wilson and Edward Heath, the latter of whom she befriended. After working as Controller of Information Services at the Independent Broadcasting Authority between 1977 and 1986, Hosking moved to Yorkshire Television to be a Political Consultant; then from 1992 to 1999 she was a Non-Executive Director of Westcountry Television, serving also as deputy chairman from 1997 to 1999, when she retired.

Outside of her working life, she was briefly a Labour member of Islington Borough Council (1962–64), President of the Media Society (1987–8) and a trustee of the Charities Aid Foundation, the 300 Group and the National Literacy Trust.

In the 1999 Birthday Honours, Hosking was appointed a Commander of the Order of the British Empire (CBE), having been appointed an Officer of the order in the 1985 Birthday Honours; she had been elected a Fellow of the Royal Television Society in 1988 and of the Royal Society of Arts. Ulster University awarded her an honorary doctorate in 1996.

== Personal life and views ==
Hosking spoke out about elitism in British society and government; in a 2017 interview with The New Statesman, she argued that "We are still much too class-ridden". She also commented on the "climate of acceptance" about the sexual harassment of women in the workplace which she encountered during her career in male-dominated spheres: "It's good that women are not now accepting abuse, though some of the terms are a bit difficult to understand". Her memoirs, Exceeding My Brief: Memoirs of a Disobedient Civil Servant were published on 21 November 2017.

Hosking died on 21 March 2021.
