= Michael Quinn (chef) =

MBE Michael Augustine Quinn
- Died: 24 August 2017
- Education: Corpus Christi Catholic College
- Occupation: Chef
- Known for: Head chef at The Ritz

Michael Augustine Quinn, MBE, was a chef and charity worker who was Head Chef at The Ritz; the first British person to hold that position. He became a homeless alcoholic, recovered, and founded an alcohol awareness charity.

== Biography ==
Michael was one of 6 children born to Agnes (Conboy) and Frank Quinn in Leeds 9. He attended Corpus Christi High School along with his siblings and both he and his brother Peter were taught by their sister Patricia. Michael began his career as apprentice at the Queens Hotel in Leeds, and in 1966 was declared 'Top Apprentice Chef of Great Britain'. He subsequently worked at Claridge's, and earned a Michelin star as head chef of Gravetye Manor, and headhunted by The Ritz in 1980. His success there led to him being known as the "Mighty Quinn". Michael made history by insisting that the menu should be written in English rather than French. He made television appearances on iconic programmes such as Farmhouse Kitchen and Wogan, and was made a Member of the Order of the British Empire (MBE) in the 1985 Birthday Honours. He appeared as a castaway on the BBC Radio programme Desert Island Discs on 17 March 1984. Michael has three children, Michael, Andrew and James.

However, by 1990, he was unemployed and sleeping on the street or in Salvation Army hostels, due to his alcoholism.

In 2001, after a period of recovery, he established the charitable Ark Foundation, which raises awareness of alcohol and drug abuse in catering colleges in the United Kingdom.

He died on 24 August 2017 at the age of 71.
