= Philip Myers (police officer) =

Sir Philip Myers (7 February 1931 – 21 June 2014) was a senior British police officer. He was the first Chief Constable of North Wales Police, serving from 1974 to 1982. He then served as an Inspector of Constabulary from 1982 to 1993.
