= Celia Thomas, Baroness Thomas of Winchester =

British baroness (born 1945)

The Right Honourable The Baroness Thomas of Winchester MBE
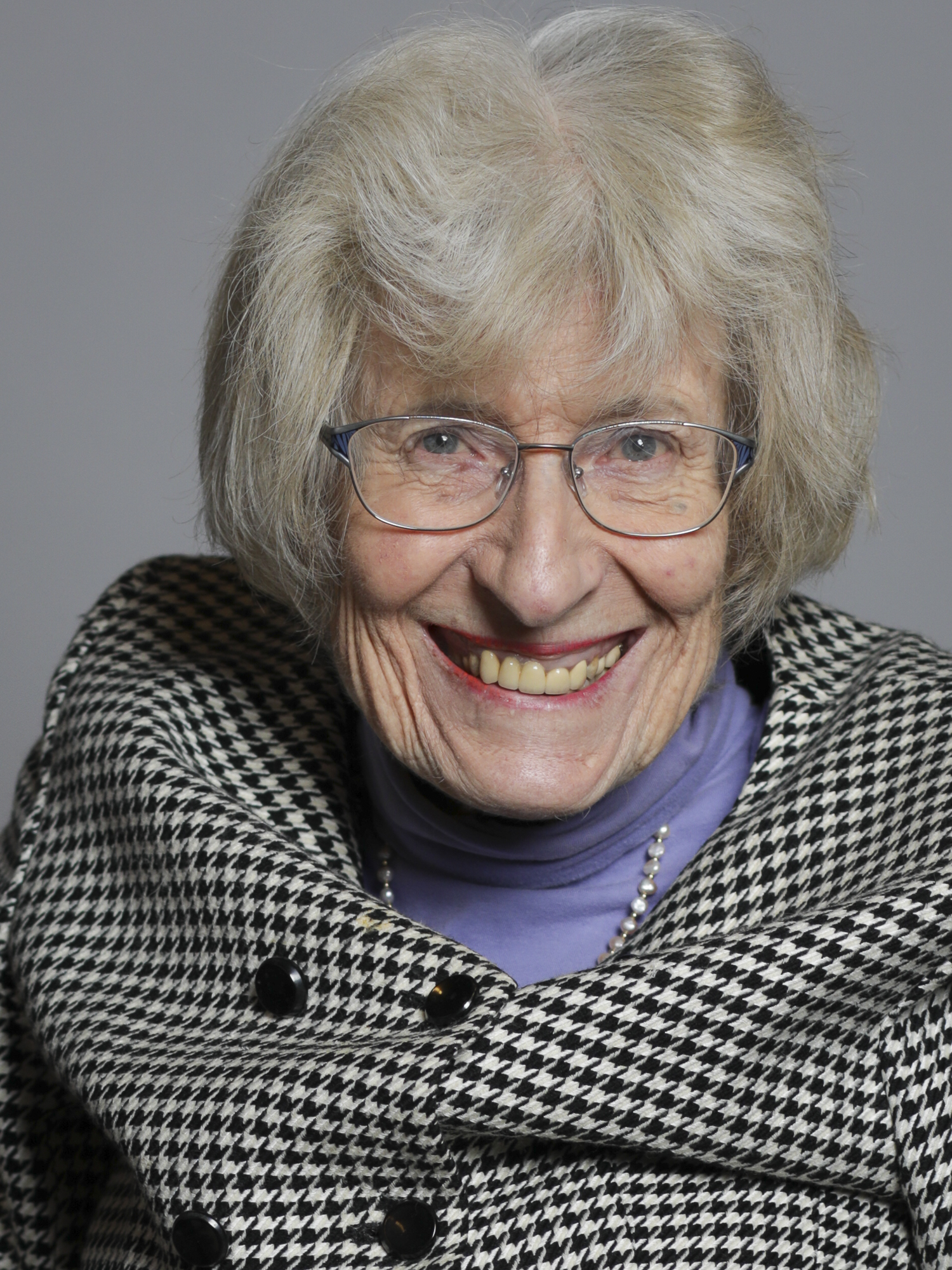
- Official portrait

Member of the House of Lords
- Lord Temporal
- Life peerage 26 May 2006

Personal details
- Born: 14 October 1945 (age 81)
- Party: Liberal Democrats

Celia Marjorie Thomas, Baroness Thomas of Winchester, MBE (born 14 October 1945 in Winchester, Hants) was a founding member of the Liberal Party in Winchester in the 1960s.

Thomas was appointed a Member of the Order of the British Empire (MBE) in the 1985 Birthday Honours.

On 26 May 2006, she was created a life peer with the title Baroness Thomas of Winchester, of Winchester in the County of Hampshire, and she sits as a Liberal Democrat.

Thomas is a Trustee of the charity Muscular Dystrophy UK, having been a long term sufferer. She is also Patron of Driving Mobility, the national charity that provides specialist driving and mobility assessment centres.
