= Bernard Audley =

British philanthropist (1924–2008)

Sir (George) Bernard Audley (24 April 1924 – 4 January 2008) was a British businessman.

== Early life ==
Born in 1924, Audley completed his studies at Corpus Christi College, Oxford before serving with the King's Dragoon Guards during World War II.

After his service he began a distinguished career in publishing and business culminating in his founding of AGB Research plc in 1962.

Following its controversial acquisition in 1989 by Maxwell Communications, Audley and his son Robert in 1990 acquired Prolog, a company founded in November 1981 by its [then] managing director, Peter Scott-Smith, and early staff members.

Audley's varied interests took to the presidency of the Periodical Publishers Association, the chairmanship of Arts Access, governorship of the Hong Kong Baptist University and a visiting professorship at Middlesex University.

== Charity ==
In 1985, he was knighted for his services to the charity Netherhall Educational Association which aims to provide all-round information for people of all ages, especially the young, to help them develop their talents to the full and use them in the service of society.

It was in the early 1960s that a deeply felt concern for London students, British and overseas – about which many have seen him speak in the film, Netherhall House a Home from Home – brought him to active support of the hall of residence.

Audley, Sir Robert Clark and Sir Rocco Forte, decided to dissolve the Trust with the consent of Netherhall Educational Association and of the Charity Commission. All agreed to retain their link with Netherhall House by joining its body of Hon Patrons and continue to support the charity.
