= Richard Carr-Gomm =

British philanthropist

Major Richard Culling Carr-Gomm, OBE (2 January 1922 – 27 October 2008) was the founder of the Abbeyfield Society, the Morpeth Society, St Matthew Society and the Carr-Gomm Society, UK charities providing care and housing for disadvantaged and lonely people.

His father was Mark Culling Carr-Gomm, and his grandfather was Francis Carr-Gomm who is known for befriending Joseph Merrick, the "Elephant Man" while serving as chairman of the London Hospital. Richard was educated at Stowe School and served through World War II in the Royal Berkshire Regiment and the Coldstream Guards from 1939 to 1955. He was awarded the Croix de Guerre in 1944 and was amongst the first troops to enter Belsen in April 1945.

Carr-Gomm was deeply affected by the Billy Graham crusade to London in 1954. In 1955 he left the Army and became a volunteer home-help. Perceiving the loneliness of the people whom he was helping to be a particular problem, he spent his Army gratuity on buying a house which he invited some of them to share with him. In his subsequent life he founded a number of charities which run care homes for the elderly, the disadvantaged, and those suffering from loneliness. For this work he was appointed an Officer of the Order of the British Empire (OBE) in 1985, and in 2004 received a Beacon Prize for lifetime achievement.

He was the subject of This Is Your Life in 1957 when he was surprised by Eamonn Andrews at the BBC Television Theatre.

The Carr-Gomm Society published his autobiography, Push on the Door in 1979. Loneliness: The Wider Scene was published in 1987.

A blue plaque in Gomm Road, Bermondsey, London Borough of Southwark, commemorates Richard Carr-Gomm and the Abbeyfield and Carr-Gomm societies.

Near to the plaque, Orchard House, on Lower Road, Bermondsey, London Borough of Southwark, has the name Gomm carved in stone above the entrance way.
