= Disabled Living Foundation =

British charitable organization

Disabled Living Foundation (DLF) also known as Living Made Easy is a non-profit national charity founded in 1969 in the United Kingdom. It provides information and advice on daily living equipment for older adults and disabled people. DLF runs a national helpline and provides online services which can be of assistance by providing help, advice and suggested courses of action.

DLF holds a subscription database of daily living equipment used by health and social care professionals across the UK. There is an online guided advice tool called "AskSARA", which provides help, advice, and information on aspects of daily living arrangements, health, and home environment. DLF also runs "Living Made Easy", an impartial advice and information website about daily living equipment and other aspects of independent living.

The foundation offers specialised training programmes consisting of CPD-accredited courses which are aimed at professional healthcare providers and carers, as well as informal carers and others who wish to learn more about interactions with disabled and older people.

The advice in "Living made easy" and "AskSARA" is accredited by The Information Standard – a quality filter which helps people to identify reliable information.
