= Elizabeth Llewellyn-Smith =

British academic administrator (born 1934)

Elizabeth Marion Llewellyn-Smith CB

Principal of St Hilda's College, Oxford
- In office 1990–2001
- Preceded by: Anne Whetstone
- Succeeded by: Sheila Forbes

Deputy Director General of Fair Trading
- In office 1982–1987

Personal details
- Born: 17 August 1934 (age 92) Upshire, Essex, England
- Education: Christ's Hospital; Girton College, Cambridge; Royal College of Defence Studies
- Occupation: Academic administrator, civil servant

Elizabeth Marion Llewellyn-Smith CB (born 17 August 1934) is a British academic administrator, who was the principal of St Hilda's College, Oxford.

== Early life and education ==
Llewellyn-Smith was born in Upshire, Essex in 1934 and educated at Christ's Hospital, Girton College, Cambridge and the Royal College of Defence Studies.

== Career ==
She was a senior civil servant, Deputy Director General of Fair Trading (1982–7), Deputy Secretary at the Department for Trade and Industry Companies Division (1987–90), director of the European Investment Bank (1987–90) and then the eighth principal of St Hilda's College from 1990 to 2001, when she retired. During her time as Principal, her portrait was commissioned, painted in 1996 by Tom Phillips, which now hangs at the college.

In 1995 she headed a working party of the Institute of Chartered Accountants in England and Wales to investigate whether large audit clients were damaged by competitive pricing, concluding they were not. She was also a lay board member of the Investigation and Discipline Board (IDB) of the Accountancy Foundation in 2002.

In 1993, Llewellyn Smith wrote of her doubts that Oxford University would consider institutional change as a way of allowing women's colleges to continue to accept only women students. In 1996, she authored a chapter as part of a collection of women writing about their journeys to leadership in higher education.

== Honours ==
She was appointed a Companion of the Order of the Bath (CB) in the 1985 Birthday Honours.

As of 2011, she was Honorary Fellow of Girton College, Cambridge.
