= Journal of Pharmacy and Pharmacology =

- Discipline: Pharmacology
- Language: English
- Edited by: D. Jones

Publication details
- Former names: Quarterly Journal of Pharmacy and Pharmacology
- History: 1870–present
- Publisher: Wiley-Blackwell on behalf of the Royal Pharmaceutical Society of Great Britain
- Frequency: Monthly
- Impact factor: 2.405 (2016)

Standard abbreviations
- ISO 4: J. Pharm. Pharmacol.

Indexing
- CODEN: JPPMAB
- ISSN: 0022-3573 (print); 2042-7158 (web)
- OCLC no.: 01754728

Links
- Journal homepage; Online access; Online archive

The Journal of Pharmacy and Pharmacology is a monthly peer-reviewed scientific journal covering all aspects of pharmacy and pharmacology. It is published by Wiley-Blackwell on behalf of the Royal Pharmaceutical Society. It is an official journal of the British Pharmaceutical Conference. It was established in 1870 and acquired its current title in 1949. The editor-in-chief is D. Jones (Queen's University Belfast).

== Abstracting and indexing ==
The journal is abstracted and indexed in:

- CAB Abstracts
- Abstracts on Hygiene and Communicable Diseases
- Index Veterinarius
- Nutrition Abstracts and Reviews A
- Review of Aromatic and Medicinal Plants
- Tropical Diseases Bulletin
- Veterinary Bulletin
- Veterinary Science Database
- Chemical Abstracts
- EMBASE/Excerpta Medica
- Scopus
- Medline
- Biological Abstracts
- BIOSIS Previews
- Biotechnology Citation Index
- Current Chemical Reactions
- Current Contents/Life Sciences
- Science Citation Index
- Zetoc

According to the Journal Citation Reports, the journal has a 2014 impact factor of 2.264, and in 2016 its ranking was 130/256 (Pharmacology & Pharmacy).
