= Abbeyfield =

Social care organisation in the United Kingdom

- Predecessor: The Abbeyfield Society
- Formation: 1956
- Founder: Richard Carr-Gomm
- Legal status: Charity
- Purpose: Provides assisted living, independent living and residential care homes for elderly people
- Region served: United Kingdom, Canada, South Africa, New Zealand, Australia, Belgium and Jersey
- Official language: English
- Key people: Richard Carr-Gomm; Nicholas Winton
- Website: www.abbeyfieldengland.com

Abbeyfield is an international membership organisation providing housing and care services for older people. Founded in 1956 by Richard Carr-Gomm, it supports a network of independent member societies that offer accommodation including assisted living, independent living and residential care homes. A central aim of the organisation is to reduce loneliness and social isolation among older people.

The Abbeyfield Movement consists of independent Abbeyfield societies operating across the United Kingdom and internationally. Outside the UK, Abbeyfield societies are established in Australia, Belgium, Canada, Jersey, New Zealand and South Africa.

All Abbeyfield societies form part of the Abbeyfield Movement, which is represented internationally by the Abbeyfield World Council. In England, member societies are affiliated with Abbeyfield England, the national membership body established in 2022 following an organisational restructuring. Abbeyfield England supports member societies in England and Wales and represents their interests at a national level.

Richard Carr-Gomm established the first Abbeyfield house in Bermondsey, London, in 1956 after recognising the need for affordable companionship and housing for older people living alone.

By 1963, the organisation had expanded to more than 100 houses across the United Kingdom, with societies established in eight London boroughs and 15 other cities.

A blue plaque installed in Gomm Road, Bermondsey, by the London Borough of Southwark commemorates Richard Carr-Gomm and the founding of Abbeyfield.

Humanitarian Nicholas Winton served as President of Abbeyfield International and was appointed a Member of the Order of the British Empire (MBE) for his charitable work, including his contribution to Abbeyfield.
