= James Garnett =

James Garnett may refer to:

- James M. Garnett (1770–1843), American planter and politician
- James Garnett (cricketer) (1809–1842), Barbados-born English cricketer
- James Clerk Maxwell Garnett (1880–1958), English educationist, barrister, and peace campaigner
