= 1984 South West Surrey by-election =

UK parliamentary by-election

- 3 May 1984

Constituency of South West Surrey
- Turnout: 61.7% (▼12.8%)
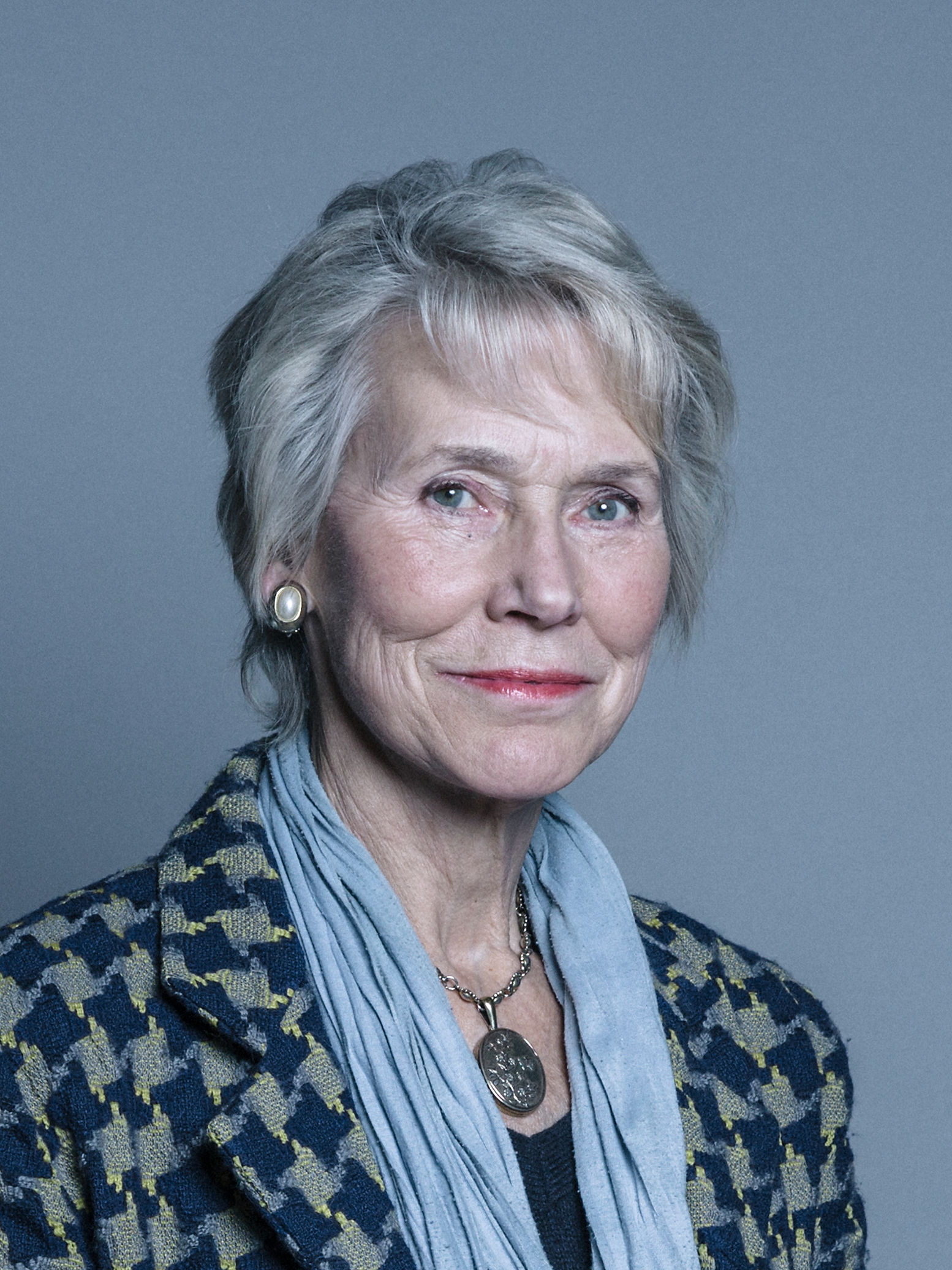
	First party	Second party	Third party
		Lib	Lab
Candidate	Virginia Bottomley	Gavin Scott	Barbara Roche
Party	Conservative	Liberal	Labour
Popular vote	21,545	18,946	2,949
Percentage	49.3%	43.4%	6.7%
Swing	▼10.4%	▲11.3%	▼1.5%
MP before election
Maurice Macmillan
Conservative
Subsequent MP
Virginia Bottomley
Conservative

The 1984 South West Surrey by-election was a parliamentary by-election held on 3 May 1984 for the British House of Commons constituency of South West Surrey.

== Previous MP ==
The seat had become vacant on 10 March 1984. The constituency's Conservative Member of Parliament (MP), Maurice Macmillan, had died suddenly at the age of 63. He had recently acquired the courtesy title of Viscount Macmillan of Ovenden when his father (who would ultimately outlive him by nearly three years) was created the Earl of Stockton on 24 February 1984.

Maurice Macmillan was a Cabinet minister in Edward Heath's government in the 1970s, as well as the son of former Conservative Prime Minister Harold Macmillan, who was still alive when his son died. He had been South West Surrey's MP since the constituency was created for the 1983 general election, having previously been MP for Farnham from 1966. Macmillan had first entered Parliament at the 1955 general election, representing the constituency of Halifax, but had lost his seat at the 1964 general election.

== Candidates ==
Six candidates were nominated. They are listed below in descending order of votes.

1. Mrs Virginia Hilda Brunette Maxwell Bottomley (born 1948) was the Conservative candidate. She was a part-time psychiatric social worker at the time of the by-election. She is married to Peter Bottomley who has also served as a Conservative MP.

Mrs Bottomley had contested the Isle of Wight in the 1983 general election. Subsequent to the by-election, she retained the seat until she retired from the House of Commons and was granted a Life Peerage in 2005. She served as a member of John Major's cabinet from 1992 until 1997.

2. The Liberal Party candidate, representing the SDP–Liberal Alliance, was freelance journalist and broadcaster Gavin Douglas Scott (born 1950). Since the by-election Scott has become known as a screenwriter.

3. The Labour nominee was Mrs Barbara Maureen Roche (born 1954), a barrister. Mrs Roche has subsequently been elected to Parliament and has served as a junior minister.

4. Victor Litvin was an Independent candidate who upset some people with his unique ballot paper label.

5. Miss Helen Mary Anscomb was an Independent candidate who frequently contested by-elections in the 1980s.

6. Peter Reid Smith was another Independent candidate.

== Result ==
By-Election 1984: South West Surrey
Party	Candidate	Votes	%	±%
Conservative	Virginia Bottomley	21,545	49.3	−10.4
Liberal	Gavin Scott	18,946	43.4	+11.3
Labour	Barbara Roche	2,949	6.7	−1.5
Pro-Nuclear Holocaust Masturbation Freedom	Victor Litvin	117	0.3	New
Death off Roads: Freight on Rail	Helen Anscomb	82	0.2	New
Votes for a full hearing	Peter Smith	29	0.1	New
Majority		2,599	5.9	−21.7
Turnout		43,668	61.7	−12.8
Conservative hold		Swing	-10.9	

== See also ==
- Surrey
- Lists of United Kingdom by-elections
- United Kingdom by-election records
