= Virginia Bottomley =

British politician (born 1948)

The Right Honourable The Baroness Bottomley of Nettlestone PC DL
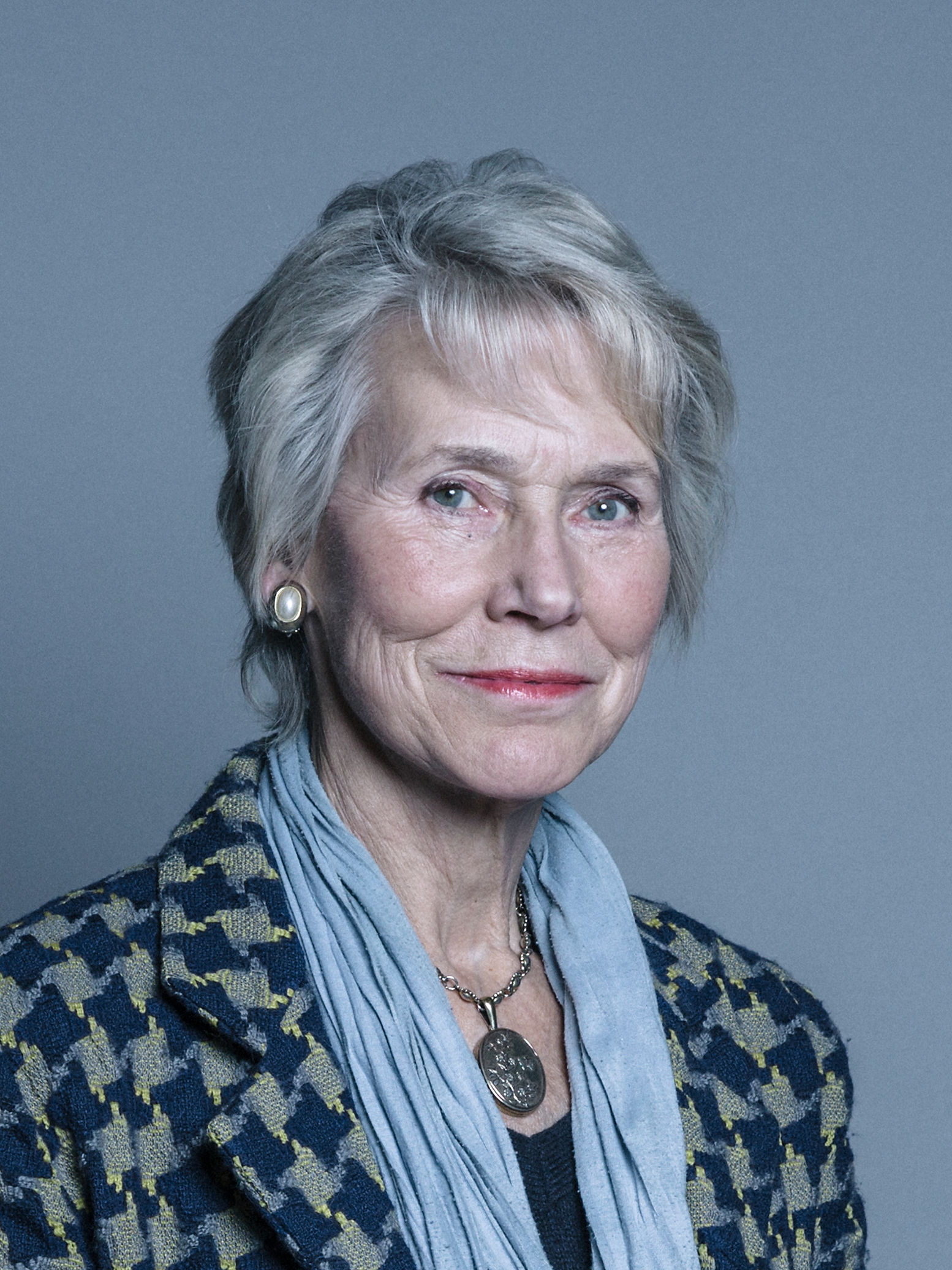
- Official portrait, 2018

Shadow Secretary of State for National Heritage
- In office 2 May 1997 – 11 June 1997
- Leader: John Major
- Preceded by: Jack Cunningham
- Succeeded by: Francis Maude

Secretary of State for National Heritage
- In office 5 July 1995 – 2 May 1997
- Prime Minister: John Major
- Preceded by: Stephen Dorrell
- Succeeded by: Chris Smith

Secretary of State for Health
- In office 10 April 1992 – 5 July 1995
- Prime Minister: John Major
- Preceded by: William Waldegrave
- Succeeded by: Stephen Dorrell

Minister of State for Health
- In office 28 October 1989 – 10 April 1992
- Prime Minister: Margaret Thatcher; John Major
- Preceded by: Anthony Trafford
- Succeeded by: Brian Mawhinney

Parliamentary Under-Secretary of State for Environment
- In office 25 July 1988 – 28 October 1989
- Prime Minister: Margaret Thatcher
- Preceded by: David Trippier
- Succeeded by: David Heathcoat-Amory

Chancellor of the University of Hull
- In office 12 April 2006 – 1 July 2023
- Vice Chancellor: Dave Petley (2022-23)
- Preceded by: Robert Armstrong
- Succeeded by: Alan Johnson
Parliamentary representation
Member of the House of Lords
Lord Temporal
Life peerage 24 June 2005
Member of Parliament for South West Surrey
In office 3 May 1984 – 11 April 2005
| Preceded by | Maurice Macmillan |
| Succeeded by | Jeremy Hunt |

Personal details
- Born: 12 March 1948 (age 78) Dunoon, Scotland
- Party: Conservative
- Spouse: Peter Bottomley (m. 1967)
- Children: Josh · Cecilia · Adela
- Education: Putney High School
- Alma mater: University of Essex (BA); London School of Economics (MA)
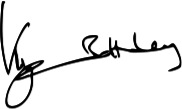
- Signature
- Website: Official website
- Virginia Bottomley's voice from the BBC Front Row, 25 April 2013

Virginia Hilda Brunette Maxwell Bottomley, Baroness Bottomley of Nettlestone, PC DL (née Garnett; born 12 March 1948) is a British Conservative Party politician and headhunter. She was a Member of Parliament (MP) in the House of Commons from 1984 to 2005. She became a member of the House of Lords in 2005.

== Early life and career ==
Virginia Hilda Brunette Maxwell Garnett was born in Dunoon, Scotland, to Barbara Rutherford-Smith, Jarrow hunger marcher, a teacher and elected Conservative member of the Inner London Education Authority and W. John Garnett CBE, former director of what was then called The Industrial Society, grandson of Cambridge physicist and educational adviser William Garnett and of Sir Edward Poulton, Hope professor of zoology at Oxford. Her paternal aunt was Labour Greater London Council member Peggy Jay. She met Peter Bottomley, her future husband, when she was 12 years old; they wed seven years later In 1967.

Bottomley was educated at Putney High School, in southwest London, before studying sociology at the University of Essex and gaining a master's degree at the London School of Economics.

She began her working life as a social scientist and was a researcher for the Child Poverty Action Group. She was a psychiatric social worker with the Institute of Psychiatry, a magistrate (Justice of the Peace), and she chaired an Inner London Juvenile Court.

== Member of Parliament and in government ==
After unsuccessfully contesting the Isle of Wight in the 1983 general election (34,904 votes), she was elected to Parliament with 21,545 votes in a by-election in 1984 (filling the seat left vacant by the death of Maurice Macmillan, son of former prime minister Harold Macmillan), as the Member for South West Surrey. She was PPS to Chris Patten and then to Foreign Secretary Sir Geoffrey Howe. She received her first ministerial position in 1988 as a Parliamentary Under-Secretary at the Department of the Environment and was appointed Minister of State at the Department of Health in 1989. She was appointed a member of the Privy Council (PC) upon joining John Major's Cabinet as Secretary of State for Health in 1992, becoming the ninth woman to serve in the British cabinet. She served as Health Secretary until 1995.

Bottomley and Ann Widdecombe have been listed as co-founders of Lady Olga Maitland's pro-nuclear Women and Families for Defence group.

She served as Secretary of State for National Heritage from 1995 to 1997. During this period, she appeared in the Eurovision Song Contest 1996, wishing luck to the United Kingdom's entrant, Gina G, in her postcard.

After the 1997 general election, she returned to the backbenches, and became a headhunter at Odgers, where she headed and then chaired the company's Board & CEO Practice.

=== Retirement ===
She stepped down from the House of Commons when the 2005 general election was called. On 24 June 2005 she was created a life peer with the title Baroness Bottomley of Nettlestone, of St Helens in the County of Isle of Wight, the parish where she was baptised and celebrated her marriage.

== Personal life ==
Bottomley is involved with charitable and academic bodies in addition to business. She was on the founding Council of the University of the Arts, London. She was a Council Member of the Ditchley Foundation and was President of Farnham Castle, Centre for International Briefing. From 2000 until May 2012 she sat on the Supervisory Board of Akzo Nobel, taking over Courtaulds and then ICI. She was a non-executive director of Bupa, a healthcare company. She was on the Advisory Council of the International Chamber of Commerce UK (ICC UK) and the Judge School of Management, Cambridge. Bottomley has been a trustee and is a fellow of the Industry and Parliament Trust. She was National President of the Abbeyfield Society and a Vice-Patron of Carers and of Cruse Bereavement Care. She was a lay canon of Guildford Cathedral, and a Freeman of the City of London.

In 2006, she was elected and installed as Chancellor of the University of Hull, succeeding Lord Armstrong of Ilminster in April 2006, serving for 17 years. She was also appointed a Deputy Lieutenant of Surrey on 22 March of that year and Sheriff of the city of Kingston upon Hull since 2013. She is the longest serving trustee of The Economist newspaper.

Virginia Garnett married Peter Bottomley in 1967, after the birth of their eldest child; he was an MP from 1975 until 2024.

During her time in Prime Minister John Major's cabinet, the satirical puppet show Spitting Image often portrayed Major as having an unrequited crush on Bottomley.

Bottomley's family includes many figures in politics and public life. Her brother, Christopher Garnett, was the chief executive of train operating company GNER. Her aunt Pauline married Roland Hunt (who is not connected to Sir Nicholas Hunt, father of Jeremy Hunt who succeeded her as MP).

Her cousins include Peter Jay (the former British Ambassador to the United States and son-in-law to James Callaghan), and Lord Hunt of Chesterton (father of historian and former Labour MP Tristram Hunt).

More distant connections include Lord Oakeshott of Seagrove Bay and Baron Jay of Ewelme (former FCO PUSS and British Ambassador to France).

Julia Cleverdon married Bottomley's late father, John. Her husband's niece is Baroness Ussher Kitty Ussher (a former Labour minister).

Parliament of the United Kingdom
| Preceded by Maurice Macmillan | Member of Parliament for South West Surrey; 1984–2005 | Succeeded by Jeremy Hunt |
Political offices
| Preceded by William Waldegrave | Secretary of State for Health; 1992–95 | Succeeded by Stephen Dorrell |
| Preceded by Stephen Dorrell | Secretary of State for National Heritage; 1995–97 | Succeeded by Chris Smith as Secretary of State for Culture, Media and Sport |
