= Effective medium approximations =

Method of approximating the properties of a composite material

In materials science, effective medium approximations (EMA) or effective medium theory (EMT) pertain to analytical or theoretical modeling that describes the macroscopic properties of composite materials. EMAs or EMTs are developed from averaging the multiple values of the constituents that directly make up the composite material. At the constituent level, the values of the materials vary and are inhomogeneous. Precise calculation of the many constituent values is nearly impossible. However, theories have been developed that can produce acceptable approximations which in turn describe useful parameters including the effective permittivity and permeability of the materials as a whole. In this sense, effective medium approximations are descriptions of a medium (composite material) based on the properties and the relative fractions of its components and are derived from calculations, and effective medium theory. There are two widely used formulae.

Effective permittivity and permeability are averaged dielectric and magnetic characteristics of a microinhomogeneous medium. They both were derived in quasi-static approximation when the electric field inside a mixture particle may be considered as homogeneous. So, these formulae can not describe the particle size effect. Many attempts were undertaken to improve these formulae.

== Applications ==
There are many different effective medium approximations, each of them being more or less accurate in distinct conditions. Nevertheless, they all assume that the macroscopic system is homogeneous and, typical of all mean field theories, they fail to predict the properties of a multiphase medium close to the percolation threshold due to the absence of long-range correlations or critical fluctuations in the theory.

The properties under consideration are usually the conductivity $\sigma$ or the dielectric constant $\varepsilon$ of the medium. These parameters are interchangeable in the formulas in a whole range of models due to the wide applicability of the Laplace equation. The problems that fall outside of this class are mainly in the field of elasticity and hydrodynamics, due to the higher order tensorial character of the effective medium constants.

EMAs can be discrete models, such as applied to resistor networks, or continuum theories as applied to elasticity or viscosity. However, most of the current theories have difficulty in describing percolating systems. Indeed, among the numerous effective medium approximations, only Bruggeman's symmetrical theory is able to predict a threshold. This characteristic feature of the latter theory puts it in the same category as other mean field theories of critical phenomena.

== Bruggeman's model ==
For a mixture of two materials with permittivities $\varepsilon_m$ and $\varepsilon_d$ with corresponding volume fractions $c_m$ and $c_d$, D.A.G. Bruggeman proposed a formula in 1935 of the following form:

$$\varepsilon_{\mathrm{eff}}=\frac{H_b+\sqrt{H_b^2+8\varepsilon_m \varepsilon_d}}{4}, \text{ with } H_b = (3c_d-1)\varepsilon_d + (3c_m-1) \varepsilon_m.$$	3

Here the positive sign before the square root must be altered to a negative sign in some cases in order to get the correct imaginary part of effective complex permittivity which is related with electromagnetic wave attenuation. The formula is symmetric with respect to swapping the 'd' and 'm' roles. This formula is based on the equality

$$\Delta\Phi=\iint \varepsilon_r(\mathbf r)E_n (\mathbf r)ds-\varepsilon_{\mathrm{eff}} \iint E_0ds=0,$$	4

where $\Delta \Phi$ is the jump of electric displacement flux all over the integration surface, $E_n(\mathbf r)$ is the component of microscopic electric field normal to the integration surface, $\varepsilon_r (\mathbf r)$ is the local relative complex permittivity which takes the value $\varepsilon_m$ inside the picked metal particle, the value $\varepsilon_d$ inside the picked dielectric particle and the value $\varepsilon_{\mathrm{eff}}$ outside the picked particle, $E_0$ is the normal component of the macroscopic electric field. Formula (4) comes out of Maxwell's equality $\operatorname{div}(\varepsilon_r\mathbf E)=0$. Thus only one picked particle is considered in Bruggeman's approach. The interaction with all the other particles is taken into account only in a mean field approximation described by $\varepsilon_{\mathrm{eff}}$. Formula (3) gives a reasonable resonant curve for plasmon excitations in metal nanoparticles if their size is 10 nm or smaller. However, it is unable to describe the size dependence for the resonant frequency of plasmon excitations that are observed in experiments

=== Formulas ===
Without any loss of generality, we shall consider the study of the effective conductivity (which can be either dc or ac) for a system made up of spherical multicomponent inclusions with different arbitrary conductivities. Then the Bruggeman formula takes the form:

==== Circular and spherical inclusions ====
$$\sum_i\,\delta_i\,\frac{\sigma_i - \sigma_e}{\sigma_i + (n-1) \sigma_e} \, = \, 0$$	1

In a system of Euclidean spatial dimension $n$ that has an arbitrary number of components, the sum is made over all the constituents. $\delta_i$ and $\sigma_i$ are respectively the fraction and the conductivity of each component, and $\sigma_e$ is the effective conductivity of the medium. (The sum over the $\delta_i$'s is unity.)

==== Elliptical and ellipsoidal inclusions ====
$$\frac{1}{n}\,\delta\alpha+\frac{(1-\delta)(\sigma_m - \sigma_e)}{\sigma_m + (n-1)\sigma_e}\, = \, 0$$	2

This is a generalization of Eq. (1) to a biphasic system with ellipsoidal inclusions of conductivity $\sigma$ into a matrix of conductivity $\sigma_m$. The fraction of inclusions is $\delta$ and the system is $n$ dimensional. For randomly oriented inclusions,

$$\alpha \, = \, \frac{1}{n}\sum_{j=1}^{n}\,\frac{\sigma - \sigma_e}{\sigma_e + L_j(\sigma - \sigma_e)}$$	3

where the $L_j$'s denote the appropriate doublet/triplet of depolarization factors which is governed by the ratios between the axis of the ellipse/ellipsoid. For example: in the case of a circle ($L_1 = 1/2$, $L_2 = 1/2$) and in the case of a sphere ($L_1 = 1/3$, $L_2 = 1/3$, $L_3 = 1/3$). (The sum over the $L_j$ 's is unity.)

The most general case to which the Bruggeman approach has been applied involves bianisotropic ellipsoidal inclusions.

=== Derivation ===
The figure illustrates a two-component medium. Consider the cross-hatched volume of conductivity $\sigma_1$, take it as a sphere of volume $V$ and assume it is embedded in a uniform medium with an effective conductivity $\sigma_e$. If the electric field far from the inclusion is $\overline{E_0}$ then elementary considerations lead to a dipole moment associated with the volume

$$\overline{p}\, \propto \,V\,\frac{\sigma_1 - \sigma_e}{\sigma_1 + 2\sigma_e} \,\overline{E_0}\,.$$	4

This polarization produces a deviation from $\overline{E_0}$. If the average deviation is to vanish, the total polarization summed over the two types of inclusion must vanish. Thus

$$\delta_1\frac{\sigma_1 - \sigma_e}{\sigma_1 + 2\sigma_e} \, + \, \delta_2\frac{\sigma_2 - \sigma_e}{\sigma_2 + 2\sigma_e} \, = \, 0$$	5

where $\delta_1$ and $\delta_2$ are respectively the volume fraction of material 1 and 2. This can be easily extended to a system of dimension $n$ that has an arbitrary number of components. All cases can be combined to yield Eq. (1).

Eq. (1) can also be obtained by requiring the deviation in current to vanish. It has been derived here from the assumption that the inclusions are spherical and it can be modified for shapes with other depolarization factors; leading to Eq. (2).

A more general derivation applicable to bianisotropic materials is also available.

=== Modeling of percolating systems ===
The main approximation is that all the domains are located in an equivalent mean field. Unfortunately, it is not the case close to the percolation threshold where the system is governed by the largest cluster of conductors, which is a fractal, and long-range correlations that are totally absent from Bruggeman's simple formula. The threshold values are in general not correctly predicted. It is 33% in the EMA, in three dimensions, far from the 16% expected from percolation theory and observed in experiments. However, in two dimensions, the EMA gives a threshold of 50% and has been proven to model percolation relatively well.

== Maxwell Garnett equation ==
In the Maxwell Garnett approximation, the effective medium consists of a matrix medium with $\varepsilon_m$ and inclusions with $\varepsilon_i$. Maxwell Garnett was the son of physicist William Garnett, and was named after Garnett's friend, James Clerk Maxwell. He proposed his formula to explain coloured pictures that are observed in glasses doped with metal nanoparticles. His formula has a form

$$\varepsilon_\text{eff} = \varepsilon_d\left[1 + 3c_m \frac{\varepsilon_m-\varepsilon_d}{\varepsilon_m + 2\varepsilon_d - c_m(\varepsilon_m-\varepsilon_d)}\right],$$	1

where $\varepsilon_\text{eff}$ is effective relative complex permittivity of the mixture, $\varepsilon_d$ is relative complex permittivity of the background medium containing small spherical inclusions of relative permittivity $\varepsilon_m$ with volume fraction of $c_m \ll 1$. This formula is based on the equality

$$\varepsilon_\text{eff} = \varepsilon_d + c_m \frac{p_m}{\varepsilon_0 E},$$	2

where $\varepsilon_0$ is the absolute permittivity of free space and $p_m$ is electric dipole moment of a single inclusion induced by the external electric field E. However this equality is good only for homogeneous medium and $\varepsilon_d = 1$. Moreover, the formula (1) ignores the interaction between single inclusions. Because of these circumstances, formula (1) gives too narrow and too high resonant curve for plasmon excitations in metal nanoparticles of the mixture.

=== Formula ===
The Maxwell Garnett equation reads:

$$\left( \frac{\varepsilon_\mathrm{eff} - \varepsilon_m}{\varepsilon_\mathrm{eff} + 2\varepsilon_m} \right) = \delta_i \left( \frac{\varepsilon_i-\varepsilon_m}{\varepsilon_i+2\varepsilon_m}\right),$$	6

where $\varepsilon_\mathrm{eff}$ is the effective dielectric constant of the medium, $\varepsilon_i$ of the inclusions, and $\varepsilon_m$ of the matrix; $\delta_i$ is the volume fraction of the inclusions.

The Maxwell Garnett equation is solved by:

$$\varepsilon_\mathrm{eff}\,=\,\varepsilon_m\,\frac{2\delta_i(\varepsilon_i - \varepsilon_m) + \varepsilon_i + 2\varepsilon_m}{2\varepsilon_m + \varepsilon_i - \delta_i(\varepsilon_i-\varepsilon_m)},$$	7

so long as the denominator does not vanish. A simple MATLAB calculator using this formula is as follows.

% This simple MATLAB calculator computes the effective dielectric
% constant of a mixture of an inclusion material in a base medium
% according to the Maxwell-Garnett theory.
% INPUTS:
%     eps_base: dielectric constant of base material;
%     eps_incl: dielectric constant of inclusion material;
%     vol_incl: volume portion of inclusion material;
% OUTPUT:
%     eps_mean: effective dielectric constant of the mixture.

function eps_mean = MaxwellGarnettFormula(eps_base, eps_incl, vol_incl)

    small_number_cutoff = 1e-6;

    if vol_incl < 0 || vol_incl > 1
        disp('WARNING: volume portion of inclusion material is out of range!');
    end
    factor_numer = 2 * (1 - vol_incl) * eps_base + (1 + 2 * vol_incl) * eps_incl;
    factor_denom = (2 + vol_incl) * eps_base + (1 - vol_incl) * eps_incl;
    if abs(factor_denom) < small_number_cutoff
        disp('WARNING: the effective medium is singular!');
        eps_mean = 0;
    else
        eps_mean = eps_base * factor_numer / factor_denom;
    end
end

=== Derivation ===
For the derivation of the Maxwell Garnett equation we start with an array of polarizable particles. By using the Lorentz local field concept, we obtain the Clausius-Mossotti relation:
$$\frac{\varepsilon-1}{\varepsilon+2} = \frac{4\pi}{3} \sum_j N_j \alpha_j$$
Where $N_j$ is the number of particles per unit volume. By using elementary electrostatics, we get for a spherical inclusion with dielectric constant $\varepsilon_i$ and a radius $a$ a polarisability $\alpha$:
$$\alpha = \left( \frac{\varepsilon_i-1}{\varepsilon_i+2} \right) a^3$$
If we combine $\alpha$ with the Clausius Mosotti equation, we get:
$$\left( \frac{\varepsilon_\mathrm{eff}-1}{\varepsilon_\mathrm{eff}+2} \right) = \delta_i \left( \frac{\varepsilon_i-1}{\varepsilon_i+2} \right)$$
Where $\varepsilon_\mathrm{eff}$ is the effective dielectric constant of the medium, $\varepsilon_i$ of the inclusions; $\delta_i$ is the volume fraction of the inclusions.
As the model of Maxwell Garnett is a composition of a matrix medium with inclusions we enhance the equation:

$$\left( \frac{\varepsilon_\mathrm{eff}-\varepsilon_m}{\varepsilon_\mathrm{eff}+2\varepsilon_m} \right) = \delta_i \left( \frac{\varepsilon_i-\varepsilon_m}{\varepsilon_i+2\varepsilon_m}\right)$$	8

=== Validity ===
In general terms, the Maxwell Garnett EMA is expected to be valid at low volume fractions $\delta_i$, since it is assumed that the domains are spatially separated and electrostatic interaction between the chosen inclusions and all other neighbouring inclusions is neglected. The Maxwell Garnett formula, in contrast to Bruggeman formula, ceases to be correct when the inclusions become resonant. In the case of plasmon resonance, the Maxwell Garnett formula is correct only at volume fraction of the inclusions $\delta_i < 10 ^{-5}$. The applicability of effective medium approximation for dielectric multilayers and metal-dielectric multilayers have been studied, showing that there are certain cases where the effective medium approximation does not hold and one needs to be cautious in application of the theory.

== Generalization of the Maxwell Garnett equation to describe the nanoparticle size distribution ==
Maxwell Garnett equation describes optical properties of nanocomposites which consist in a collection of perfectly spherical nanoparticles. All these nanoparticles must have the same size. However, due to confinement effect, the optical properties can be influenced by the nanoparticles size distribution. As shown by Battie et al., the Maxwell Garnett equation can be generalized to take into account this distribution.

$\frac{(\varepsilon_\text{eff}-\varepsilon_m)}{\varepsilon_\text{eff}-2\varepsilon_m} =\frac{3i \lambda^3}{16\pi^2\varepsilon_m^{1.5}}\frac{f}{R_m^3}\int P(R) a_1(R) dR$

$R$ and $P(R)$ are the nanoparticle radius and size distribution, respectively. $R_m$ and $f$ are the mean radius and the volume fraction of the nanoparticles, respectively. $a_1$ is the first electric Mie coefficient. This equation reveals that the classical Maxwell Garnett equation gives a false estimation of the volume fraction nanoparticles when the size distribution cannot be neglected.

=== Generalization to include shape distribution of nanoparticles ===
The Maxwell Garnett equation only describes the optical properties of a collection of perfectly spherical nanoparticles. However, the optical properties of nanocomposites are sensitive to the nanoparticles shape distribution. To overcome this limit, Y. Battie et al. have developed the shape distributed effective medium theory (SDEMT). This effective medium theory enables to calculate the effective dielectric function of a nanocomposite which consists in a collection of ellipsoïdal nanoparticles distributed in shape.

$\varepsilon_\text{eff}=\frac{(1-f)\varepsilon_m+f\beta\varepsilon_i }{1-f+f\beta}$

with $\beta=\frac{1}{3}\iint P(L_1,L_2)\sum_{i \mathop =1}^3 \frac{\varepsilon_m}{\varepsilon_m+L_i(\varepsilon_i-\varepsilon_m)}dL_1 dL_2$

The depolarization factors ($L_1, L_2, L_3$) only depend on the shape of nanoparticles. $P(L_1,L_2)$ is the distribution of depolarization factors. $f$ is the volume fraction of the nanoparticles.

The SDEMT theory was used to extract the shape distribution of nanoparticles from absorption or ellipsometric spectra.

== Formula describing size effect ==
A new formula describing size effect was proposed. This formula has a form
$$\varepsilon_\text{eff} = \frac{1}{4}\left(H_{\varepsilon} + i \sqrt{-H_{\varepsilon}^2 - 8\varepsilon_m \varepsilon_dJ(k_ma)}\right),$$

$$H_{\varepsilon}=(2-3c_m) \varepsilon_d-(1-3c_m) \varepsilon_m J(k_m a),$$	5

$$J(x)=2\frac{1-x\cot(x)}{x^2+x\cot(x)-1},$$
where a is the nanoparticle radius and $k_m = \sqrt{\varepsilon_m \mu_m} \omega / c$ is wave number. It is supposed here that the time dependence of the electromagnetic field is given by the factor $\mathrm{exp}(-i \omega t).$ In this paper Bruggeman's approach was used, but electromagnetic field for electric-dipole oscillation mode inside the picked particle was computed without applying quasi-static approximation. Thus the function $J(k_m a)$ is due to the field nonuniformity inside the picked particle. In quasi-static region ($k_m a \ll 1$, i.e. $a \leq \mathrm{10\,nm}$ for Ag$)$ this function becomes constant $J(k_m a)=1$ and formula (5) becomes identical with Bruggeman's formula.

== Effective permeability formula ==
Formula for effective permeability of mixtures has a form

$$\mu_\text{eff} = \frac{1}{4} \left(H_{\mu} + i \sqrt{-H_{\mu}^2-8\mu_m \mu_d J(k_m a)}\right),$$	6

$$H_{\mu} = (2-3c_m)\mu_d-(1-3c_m)\mu_m J(k_m a).$$

Here $\mu_\text{eff}$ is effective relative complex permeability of the mixture, $\mu_d$ is relative complex permeability of the background medium containing small spherical inclusions of relative permeability $\mu_m$ with volume fraction of $c_m \ll 1$. This formula was derived in dipole approximation. Magnetic octupole mode and all other magnetic oscillation modes of odd orders were neglected here. When $\mu_m=\mu_d$ and $k_m a \ll 1$ this formula has a simple form

$$\mu_\text{eff}=\mu_d \left( 1+\frac{c_m}{10} \frac{\omega^2}{c^2}a^2 \varepsilon_m \right).$$	7

== Effective medium theory for resistor networks ==
For a network consisting of a high density of random resistors, an exact solution for each individual element may be impractical or impossible. In such case, a random resistor network can be considered as a two-dimensional graph and the effective resistance can be modelled in terms of graph measures and geometrical properties of networks. Assuming, edge length is much less than electrode spacing and edges to be uniformly distributed, the potential can be considered to drop uniformly from one electrode to another. Sheet resistance of such a random network ($R_{sn}$) can be written in terms of edge (wire) density ($N_E$), resistivity ($\rho$), width ($w$) and thickness ($t$) of edges (wires) as:

$$R_{sn}\,=\,\frac{\pi}{2}\frac{\rho}{w\,t\,\sqrt{N_E}}$$	9

== See also ==
- Constitutive equation
- Percolation threshold
