= Julia Cleverdon =

British charity worker

Dame Julia Charity Cleverdon DCVO CBE (born 19 April 1950) is a British charity worker who served for 16 years as Chief Executive of Business in the Community, one of the Prince's Charities of Charles, Prince of Wales.

== Biography ==
Born in North London, Cleverdon is the daughter of Douglas Cleverdon, the BBC Radio producer. She was educated at Camden School for Girls and graduated with a History degree from Newnham College, Cambridge. Cleverdon has honorary degrees from the University of Warwick and Harper Adams University.

She joined The Industrial Society, a business relations organisation. She eventually became the society's Director of Education and Inner City Division. She was appointed Chief Executive of Business in the Community on 1 April 1992. During her service she significantly expanded the charity's work, and was named one of the "50 most influential women in Britain" by The Times. Since stepping down as Chief Executive on 1 March 2008, she has served as Vice President.

She held voluntary roles as Chair of Teach First, membership of both the National Council for Educational Excellence and the Prime Minister's Talent and Enterprise Taskforce Advisory Group, patron of the Helena Kennedy Bursary Scheme and previously Beanstalk (formerly known as Volunteer Reading Help), an ambassador for the World Wildlife Fund, and director of In Kind Direct.

== Honours ==
In recognition of her work, she was appointed a Commander of the Order of the British Empire (CBE) in the 1996 Birthday Honours for services to Training and to Equal Opportunities. In the 2003 New Year Honours, she was appointed a Commander of the Royal Victorian Order (CVO), and was promoted to Dame Commander of the Royal Victorian Order (DCVO) in the 2008 Birthday Honours.

She is one of the co-founders of the #iwill campaign, along with Amanda Jordan, for youth social action and sits on their board of trustees.

== Personal life ==
Cleverdon was first married to Martin Ollard, a stockbroker. In 1986 she married W. John Garnett (died 14 August 1997), former director of The Industrial Society, by whom she has two daughters Tor and Charity. She is the stepmother of Virginia Bottomley (née Garnett).
