= William John Garnett =

British industrial relations campaigner

(William) John Poulton Maxwell Garnett CBE (6 August 1921 – 14 August 1997) was a British industrial relations campaigner who led The Industrial Society (now The Work Foundation) from 1962 until 1986.

== Career ==
After university, Garnett joined Imperial Chemical Industries as a graduate trainee, initially in Glasgow. He continued to work at ICI until 1962, becoming personnel manager at their plastics factory in Blackpool. In 1962, Garnett was appointed Director of "The Industrial Welfare Society", which he renamed to simply "The Industrial Society", from where he became a well-known speaker, campaigner and thought-leader in industrial relations for a quarter century, notably writing his thoughts up in The Work Challenge, published in 1973. He was appointed a CBE in the Queen's Birthday Honours in 1970.

== Personal life ==
The son of (James Clerk) Maxwell Garnett, C.B.E., and Margaret Lucy (daughter of Sir Edward Bagnall Poulton), and grandson of physicist and educational adviser William Garnett, Garnett was educated at Rugby and Kent School in Connecticut, USA, becoming an undergraduate at Trinity College, Cambridge, in 1940. In 1941 he joined the War effort, volunteering to join the Royal Navy, where he served as a first lieutenant ferrying personnel covertly between the UK and occupied France over the English Channel. After the war, Garnett returned to his studies, and was awarded a degree in economics.

In 1943, Garnett married Barbara Rutherford-Smith, with whom he had two sons and two daughters, including Virginia (now Lady) Bottomley. In 1985 they divorced, and later that year he married his Industrial Society colleague Julia (now Dame) Cleverdon, and with whom he had two daughters.
