= South West Surrey =

UK Parliament constituency (1983–2024)

Coordinates: 51.15°N 0.70°W

- Former county constituency for the House of Commons
- Boundary of South West Surrey in Surrey

- Location of Surrey within England
- County: Surrey
- Electorate: 76,495 (December 2010)
- Major settlements: Farnham, Godalming and Haslemere

1983–2024
- Seats: One
- Created from: Farnham
- Replaced by: Farnham and Bordon, Godalming and Ash

South West Surrey was a constituency (Note: A county constituency (for the purposes of election expenses and type of returning officer)) in the House of Commons of the UK Parliament. (Note: As with all constituencies, the constituency elects one Member of Parliament (MP) by the first past the post system of election at least every five years.) From its 1983 creation, South West Surrey was represented only by members of the Conservative Party. From 2005, the seat's MP was Jeremy Hunt, who served as chancellor of the Exchequer until 2024, and formerly Culture Secretary, Health Secretary and Foreign Secretary.

Further to the completion of the 2023 review of Westminster constituencies, the constituency was abolished. Subject to major boundary changes - including the combination of the western part of the seat, including the towns of Farnham and Haslemere and comprising the majority of the electorate, with parts of the District of East Hampshire - it was reformed as Farnham and Bordon, first contested at the 2024 general election. Godalming and the area of the North Downs to the south was included in the newly created constituency of Godalming and Ash.

== Boundaries ==
Map of boundaries 2010–2024

1983–2010: The District of Waverley wards of Alford and Dunsfold, Busbridge, Hambledon and Hascombe, Chiddingfold, Elstead, Peper Harow and Thursley, Farnham Bourne, Farnham Castle, Farnham Hale and Heath End, Farnham Rowledge and Wrecclesham, Farnham Upper Hale, Farnham Waverley, Farnham Weybourne and Badshot Lea, Frensham, Dockenfield and Tilford, Godalming North, Godalming North East and South West, Godalming North West, Godalming South East, Haslemere North and Grayswood, Haslemere South, Hindhead, Milford, Shottermill, and Witley.

2010–2024: The Borough of Waverley wards of Bramley, Busbridge and Hascombe, Chiddingfold and Dunsfold, Elstead and Thursley, Farnham Bourne, Farnham Castle, Farnham Firgrove, Farnham Hale and Heath End, Farnham Moor Park, Farnham Shortheath and Boundstone, Farnham Upper Hale, Farnham Weybourne and Badshot Lea, Farnham Wrecclesham and Rowledge, Frensham, Dockenfield and Tilford, Godalming Binscombe, Godalming Central and Ockford, Godalming Charterhouse, Godalming Farncombe and Catteshall, Godalming Holloway, Haslemere Critchmere and Shottermill, Haslemere East and Grayswood, Hindhead, Milford, and Witley and Hambledon.

The seat included the towns of Farnham, Godalming and Haslemere.

=== Fifth Periodic Review of Westminster constituencies ===
The Boundary Commission's recommendations implemented by Parliament for 2010 saw the realignment of the boundary with Guildford in order to bring it in line with adjustment of local government wards. Guildford's electorate was the largest of the county and this aimed to reduce it. Two wards split between the two constituencies: Bramley; and Busbridge and Hascombe, afterwards entirely in South West Surrey; and the ward 'Alfold, Cranleigh Rural and Ellens Green' was split, so it was consolidated into Guildford for the 2010 general election. The net effect was to increase the number of voters in South West Surrey and reduce the number in Guildford.

A public review was called, dealing primarily with objections to receiving the rest of Bramley. Many petitioned to argue that the village's links, especially transport, were mainly with Guildford rather than the towns of Godalming (or Farnham). The precedent of the previous review was cited, when a proposal to move Bramley out of Guildford and into Mole Valley was rejected after local opposition. However, the review felt that this did not justify splitting the ward (something the Boundary Commission seeks to avoid completely) and that the other parts of the ward had strong links to Godalming. Furthermore, it cited the point that, in the previous review, Bramley Parish Council had stated that if it were to be moved it would prefer to be moved to South West Surrey and thus argued that the previous objection had accommodated a preferred progressive change towards being wholly in South West Surrey if necessary to equalise electorates.

== History ==
The constituency was created in 1983, largely replacing the former seat of Farnham. It was consistently won by the Conservative Party, though the majority dropped to a mere 861 votes in 2001, leaving it as the Liberal Democrats' third target constituency by swing required. Subsequently, the Conservative majority substantially increased, exceeding 28,000 votes in 2015.

In the 2011 referendum on adopting the Alternative Vote (AV) system, Waverley Borough, which includes the constituency, rejected the proposal by 72.6%. In the 2016 referendum on the UK's membership of the European Union, Waverley voted to remain in the European Union by 58.4%.

In the 2017 general election, the Green Party endorsed Dr Louise Irvine, of the National Health Action Party, and did not field its own candidate in an attempt to unseat the incumbent Jeremy Hunt as a result of his controversial record as the Secretary of State for Health. Some local members of the Labour and Liberal Democrat parties also advocated not fielding a candidate for their respective parties. However, the national Labour party declined to withdraw in the seat, saying that it would impose its own candidate if necessary, and Labour party members who publicly supported Dr Irvine were expelled. The Liberal Democrats also declined to withdraw. In 2019, Dr. Irvine declined to stand and endorsed the Liberal Democrat candidate. At the election, the Liberal Democrats polled over 17,000 more votes - an almost 30% vote share increase - compared to 2017, though Hunt retained his seat by 8,817 votes.

=== Prominent members ===
Virginia Bottomley, the MP from 1984 to 2005, became the Secretary of State for Health in 1992 (a Privy Council level office). She then served as the Secretary of State for National Heritage from 1995 to 1997. She was elevated to the House of Lords as Baroness Bottomley of Nettlestone in 2005, having left the House of Commons in the same year.

Jeremy Hunt served as the Secretary of State for Culture, Olympics, Media and Sport, Secretary of State for Health, Foreign Secretary, Chair of the Health and Social Care Select Committee and Chancellor of the Exchequer.

== Constituency profile ==
The constituency included one end of the Greensand Ridge, including the Devil's Punch Bowl and visitor centre at Hindhead. The area had two railways, a branch line via Farnham, the Alton line and the Portsmouth Direct line. The A3 three-lane highway passed through the seat.

Workless claimants (registered jobseekers) were in November 2012 significantly lower than the national average of 3.8%, at 1.5% of the population based on a statistical compilation by The Guardian.

== Members of Parliament ==
| Election | Member | Party |
|---|---|---|
| 1983 | Maurice Macmillan | Conservative |
| 1984 by-election | Virginia Bottomley | Conservative |
| 2005 | Jeremy Hunt | Conservative |
| 2024 | constituency abolished | |

== Elections ==
=== Elections in the 2010s ===
General election 2019: South West Surrey
| Party | Candidate | Votes | % | ±% |
|---|---|---|---|---|
| Conservative | Jeremy Hunt | 32,191 | 53.3 | −2.4 |
| Liberal Democrats | Paul Follows | 23,374 | 38.7 | +28.8 |
| Labour | Tim Corry | 4,775 | 7.9 | −4.7 |
| Majority | | 8,817 | 14.6 | −21.1 |
| Turnout | | 60,340 | 76.3 | −1.3 |
| Conservative hold | | Swing | −15.6 | |

General election 2017: South West Surrey
| Party | Candidate | Votes | % | ±% |
|---|---|---|---|---|
| Conservative | Jeremy Hunt | 33,683 | 55.7 | −4.2 |
| NHA | Louise Irvine | 12,093 | 20.0 | +11.5 |
| Labour | David Black | 7,606 | 12.6 | +3.1 |
| Liberal Democrats | Ollie Purkiss | 5,967 | 9.9 | +3.6 |
| UKIP | Mark Webber | 1,083 | 1.8 | −8.0 |
| Majority | | 21,590 | 35.7 | −14.3 |
| Turnout | | 60,432 | 77.6 | +3.6 |
| Conservative hold | | Swing | | |

General election 2015: South West Surrey
| Party | Candidate | Votes | % | ±% |
|---|---|---|---|---|
| Conservative | Jeremy Hunt | 34,199 | 59.9 | +1.2 |
| UKIP | Mark Webber | 5,643 | 9.9 | +7.3 |
| Labour | Howard Kaye | 5,415 | 9.5 | +3.5 |
| NHA | Louise Irvine | 4,851 | 8.5 | New |
| Liberal Democrats | Patrick Haveron (Note: After nominations were closed, Haveron was suspended by the Liberal Democrats following allegations that he had falsified council nomination papers. Although his name still appeared on the ballot papers as the Liberal Democrat candidate, the party said he no longer represented them and the treasurer of the local branch encouraged supporters to vote for Louise Irvine instead.) | 3,586 | 6.3 | −23.9 |
| Green | Susan Ryland | 3,105 | 5.4 | +4.2 |
| Something New | Paul Robinson | 320 | 0.6 | New |
| Majority | | 28,556 | 50.0 | +21.5 |
| Turnout | | 57,119 | 74.0 | +0.6 |
| Conservative hold | | Swing | | |

General election 2010: South West Surrey
| Party | Candidate | Votes | % | ±% |
|---|---|---|---|---|
| Conservative | Jeremy Hunt | 33,605 | 58.7 | +8.1 |
| Liberal Democrats | Mike Simpson | 17,287 | 30.2 | −9.2 |
| Labour | Richard Mollet | 3,419 | 6.0 | −1.9 |
| UKIP | Roger Meekins | 1,486 | 2.6 | +0.8 |
| Green | Cherry Allan | 690 | 1.2 | New |
| BNP | Helen Hamilton | 644 | 1.1 | New |
| Pirate | Luke Leighton | 94 | 0.2 | New |
| Independent | Arthur Price | 34 | 0.1 | New |
| Majority | | 16,318 | 28.5 | +17.6 |
| Turnout | | 57,259 | 73.4 | +3.4 |
| Conservative hold | | Swing | +8.6 | |

=== Elections in the 2000s ===
General election 2005: South West Surrey
| Party | Candidate | Votes | % | ±% |
|---|---|---|---|---|
| Conservative | Jeremy Hunt | 26,420 | 50.4 | +5.1 |
| Liberal Democrats | Simon Cordon | 20,709 | 39.5 | −4.1 |
| Labour | Tom Sleigh | 4,150 | 7.9 | −0.8 |
| UKIP | Timothy Clark | 958 | 1.8 | −0.6 |
| Veritas | Glenn Platt | 172 | 0.3 | New |
| Majority | | 5,711 | 10.9 | +9.2 |
| Turnout | | 52,409 | 71.8 | +1.5 |
| Conservative hold | | Swing | +4.6 | |

General election 2001: South West Surrey
| Party | Candidate | Votes | % | ±% |
|---|---|---|---|---|
| Conservative | Virginia Bottomley | 22,462 | 45.3 | +0.7 |
| Liberal Democrats | Simon Cordon | 21,601 | 43.6 | +3.8 |
| Labour | Martin Whelton | 4,321 | 8.7 | −0.7 |
| UKIP | Timothy Clark | 1,208 | 2.4 | +1.7 |
| Majority | | 861 | 1.7 | −3.1 |
| Turnout | | 49,592 | 70.3 | −7.2 |
| Conservative hold | | Swing | −1.6 | |

=== Elections in the 1990s ===
General election 1997: South West Surrey
| Party | Candidate | Votes | % | ±% |
|---|---|---|---|---|
| Conservative | Virginia Bottomley | 25,165 | 44.6 | −13.9 |
| Liberal Democrats | Neil Sherlock | 22,471 | 39.8 | +6.3 |
| Labour | Margaret Leicester | 5,333 | 9.4 | +3.0 |
| Referendum | Judith Clementson | 2,830 | 5.0 | New |
| UKIP | James Kirby | 401 | 0.7 | New |
| ProLife Alliance | Josephine Quintavalle | 258 | 0.5 | New |
| Majority | | 2,694 | 4.8 | −20.2 |
| Turnout | | 56,458 | 77.5 | −5.3 |
| Conservative hold | | Swing | −10.1 | |

The seat underwent boundary changes between the 1992 and 1997 general elections and thus vote share changes are based on a notional calculation.

General election 1992: South West Surrey
| Party | Candidate | Votes | % | ±% |
|---|---|---|---|---|
| Conservative | Virginia Bottomley | 35,008 | 58.5 | −1.0 |
| Liberal Democrats | Neil Sherlock | 20,033 | 33.5 | −0.9 |
| Labour | Philip Kelly | 3,840 | 6.4 | +0.8 |
| Green | Nigel Bedrock | 710 | 1.2 | New |
| Natural Law | Keith Campbell | 147 | 0.3 | New |
| Anglo-Saxon | Donald Newman | 98 | 0.2 | New |
| Majority | | 14,975 | 25.0 | −0.1 |
| Turnout | | 59,836 | 82.8 | +4.4 |
| Conservative hold | | Swing | −0.1 | |

=== Elections in the 1980s ===
General election 1987: South West Surrey
| Party | Candidate | Votes | % | ±% |
|---|---|---|---|---|
| Conservative | Virginia Bottomley | 34,024 | 59.5 | −0.2 |
| Liberal | Gavin Scott | 19,681 | 34.4 | +2.3 |
| Labour | John Evers | 3,224 | 5.6 | −2.6 |
| Ind. Conservative | Matthew Green | 299 | 0.5 | New |
| Majority | | 14,343 | 25.1 | −2.5 |
| Turnout | | 57,228 | 78.4 | +3.9 |
| Conservative hold | | Swing | −1.3 | |

By-election 1984: South West Surrey
| Party | Candidate | Votes | % | ±% |
|---|---|---|---|---|
| Conservative | Virginia Bottomley | 21,545 | 49.3 | −10.4 |
| Liberal | Gavin Scott | 18,946 | 43.4 | +11.3 |
| Labour | Barbara Roche | 2,949 | 6.7 | −1.5 |
| Pro-Nuclear Holocaust Masturbation Freedom | Victor Litvin | 117 | 0.3 | New |
| Death off Roads: Freight on Rail | Helen Anscomb | 82 | 0.2 | New |
| Votes for a full hearing | Peter Smith | 29 | 0.1 | New |
| Majority | | 2,599 | 5.9 | −21.7 |
| Turnout | | 43,668 | 61.7 | −12.8 |
| Conservative hold | | Swing | −10.9 | |

General election 1983: South West Surrey
| Party | Candidate | Votes | % | ±% |
|---|---|---|---|---|
| Conservative | Maurice Macmillan | 31,067 | 59.7 | |
| Liberal | George Scott | 16,716 | 32.1 | |
| Labour | Stephen Williams | 4,239 | 8.2 | |
| Majority | | 14,351 | 27.6 | |
| Turnout | | 52,022 | 74.5 | |
| Conservative win (new seat) | | | | |

== See also ==
- Parliamentary constituencies in Surrey

== Sources ==
- Election result, 2005 (BBC)
- Election results, 1997 – 2001 (BBC)
- Election results, 1997 – 2001 (Election Demon)
- Election results, 1983 – 1992 (Election Demon)
- Election results, 1992 – 2010 (Guardian)
- By-election result, 1984

Parliament of the United Kingdom
| Preceded by Spelthorne | Constituency represented by the chancellor of the Exchequer; 2022–2024 | Succeeded by Godalming and Ash |
| Preceded by Uxbridge and South Ruislip | Constituency represented by the foreign secretary 2018–2019 | Succeeded by Esher and Walton |
