= The Wabe =

Historic house on Redington Road, Hampstead, London, built in 1902–1903

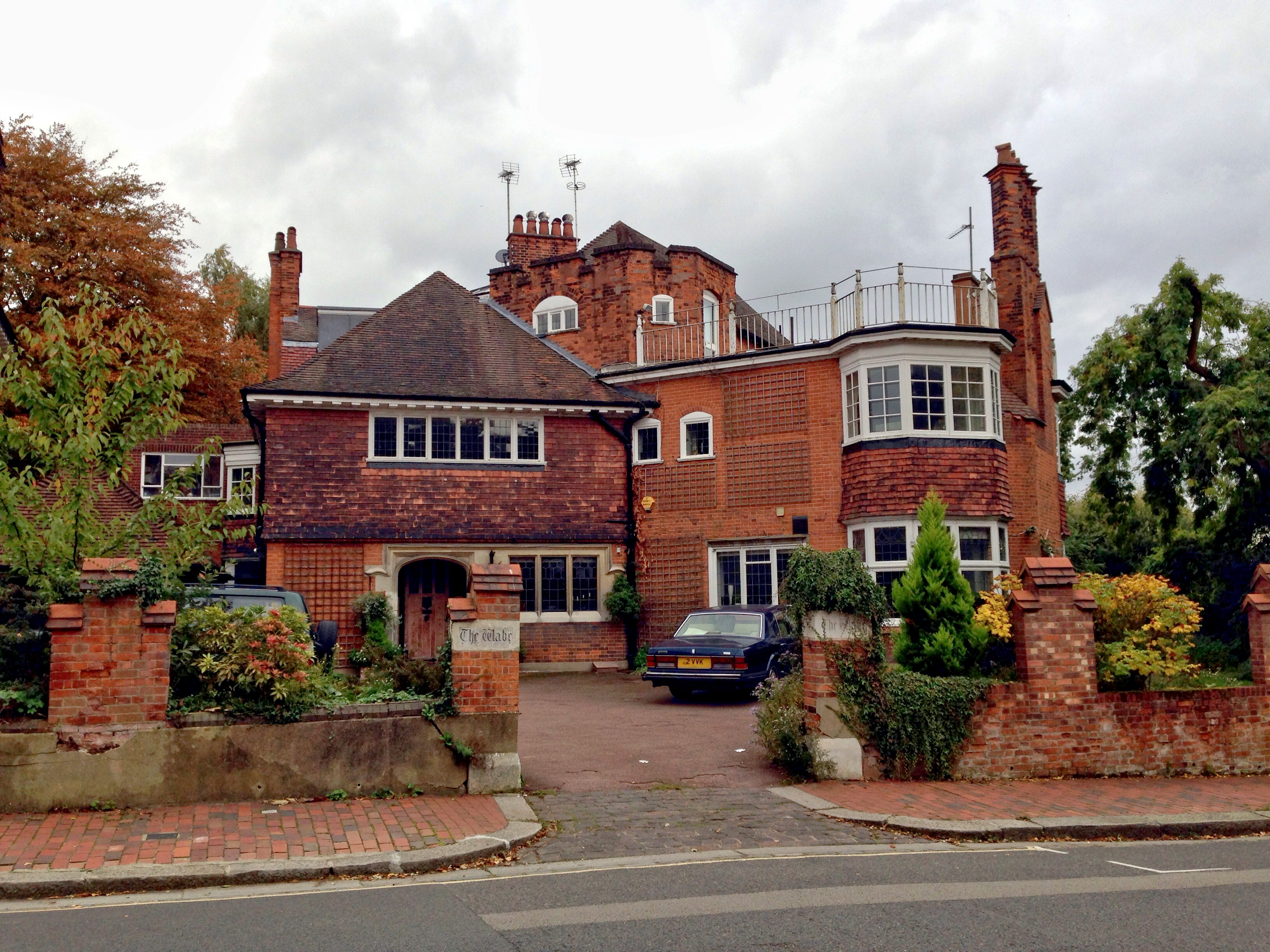
- Interactive map of the The Wabe area

General information
- Type: House
- Location: Redington Road, Hampstead, London, England
- Coordinates: 51.5611°N 0.1876°W
- Construction started: 1902
- Completed: 1903

Design and construction
- Architect: William Garnett

The Wabe is an architecturally eclectic detached house on Redington Road, Hampstead, London, built in 1902–1903 for the academic and mathematician William Garnett. It was subsequently the home of the Canadian explorer Mina Hubbard and her husband, and later of the actor Tom Conti and his wife.

== History ==
The house was designed and built in 1902–1903 for the academic and mathematician William Garnett, in a mixture of styles that include Arts and Crafts, Art Nouveau and Scottish Baronial. It was inspired by Garnett's love of Lewis Carroll's Jabberwocky poem, "Twas brillig, and the slithy toves/Did gyre and gimble in the wabe:/All mimsy were the borogoves,/And the mome raths outgrabe."

In 1913, Garnett sold the house to the Yorkshire industrialist, Harold Ellis, and his Canadian explorer wife Mina Benson Hubbard. Hubbard was an advocate of women's suffrage and their guests at the house included the leading suffrage campaigner Emmeline Pankhurst, Isadora Duncan who gave a dance performance there to raise funds for the cause, George Bernard Shaw, Rudyard Kipling and H. G. Wells.

The house was converted into flats in the 1950s. The photographer Harrison Marks and his partner the nude model Pamela Green lived in one of the flats. The house was restored to a single dwelling in 1985 after it was purchased by the actor Tom Conti and his wife Kara Wilson. In May 2015, The Wabe has been listed for sale, following a protracted dispute with Conti's neighbour, the former footballer Thierry Henry. In 2015, Conti commented that "this used to be a wonderful place to live, but in the past ten years there's been endless, endless building." Henry had obtained planning permission to demolish his house and build a new one, including a 25,000-litre (5,500 imp gal; 6,600 US gal) aquarium spanning four floors. But he also remarked "“It becomes silly as I sit here looking at my vast heating bills. So we are downsizing", and denied Henry was a reason he would sell. In late 2018 the house was sold to filmmaker Tim Burton for £11million.
