= Louise Irvine =

British doctor and health campaigner

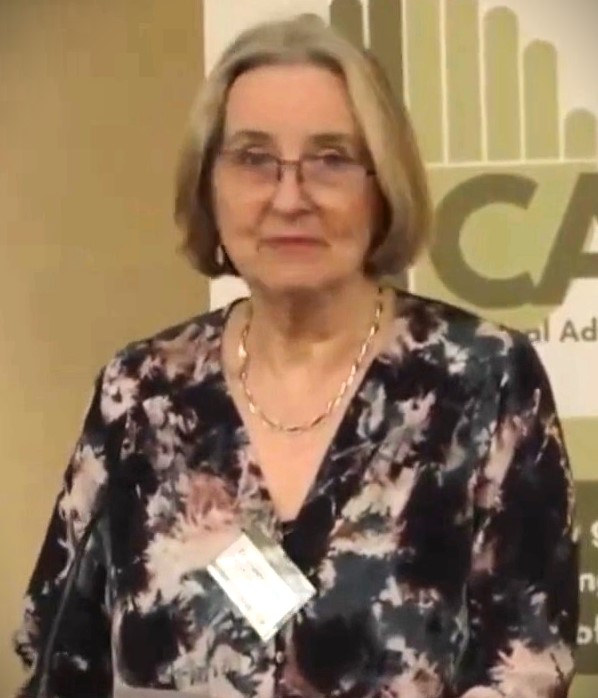
- Irvine in 2024
- Born: Marie-Louise Irvine; Paisley, Scotland
- Education: University of Aberdeen
- Occupations: General Practitioner, Prospective Parliamentary Candidate
- Website: http://nhaswsurrey.wordpress.com/

Marie-Louise Irvine is a Scottish general practitioner, health campaigner, and parliamentary candidate. She unsuccessfully stood for election in the 2015 general election and the 2017 general election for the National Health Action Party in the constituency of South West Surrey. She came second to Jeremy Hunt in the 2017 election; reducing his majority.

== Early life and education ==
Marie-Louise Irvine was born in Paisley, Scotland. She attended Harlaw Academy in Aberdeen. She studied at the University of Aberdeen, graduating with a MBChB in 1981.

== Career ==
=== Medical career ===
Irvine helped set up the Scottish Medical Aid for Nicaragua in 1980, raising funds for, and helping to set up a medical centre in San Juan del Sur. She worked as a volunteer primary care doctor in Nicaragua 1983–85 before she returned to the UK and trained as a general practitioner in the west of Scotland. In 1995 she became a GP partner at Amersham Vale Practice in Lewisham. As of 2017, she is a practice trainer for GP registrars and works part-time at the practice. In 2002 she became a Programme Director for the GP training scheme in Lewisham. She also holds a Diploma from the Faculty of Family Planning and Reproductive Medicine, a Diploma from the Royal College of Obstetricians and Gynaecologists, is a Member of the Royal College of General Practitioners. She has an MSc in general practice from King's College London. She founded ArtsLift, a project that allowed people with mental health problems to gain access to arts classes.

In April 2012, she was elected to the Council of the British Medical Association for a four-year term. She was elected again in 2016.

=== Politics ===
In 2001, Irvine led a group that campaigned for the London Borough of Lewisham to open a new state secondary school in New Cross. When the "New School for New Cross" campaign failed to gain support from established parties, they formed their own political party which they named Leap (Local Education Action by Parents). The party fielded six candidates in local elections and Irvine stood as a candidate for the Mayor of Lewisham. One of the Leap candidates won a seat in the Telegraph Hill ward.

In October 2012, plans to reduce casualty and maternity services at Lewisham Hospital were announced, after a neighbouring hospital trust ran up large debts. The "Save Lewisham Hospital campaign" was founded and held protests with Irvine as the chair. On 31 January, the Secretary of State for Health Jeremy Hunt announced casualty and maternity units at Lewisham Hospital would be downgraded. The campaign group took the case to the High Court which ruled in July 2013 that the Health Secretary had acted outside his powers. In October the Government appealed, and was again defeated.

In November 2012, the National Health Action Party (NHA Party) was formed, with Irvine a founder member. Irvine was a candidate for the NHA Party in the 2014 European Elections, saying that

"The Conservatives and Liberal Democrats outrageously broke their pre-election pledges that there would be no top down re-organisation of the NHS and no NHS privatisation."

In September 2014, she announced that she would be contesting the parliamentary seat of South West Surrey for the NHA Party, the seat of Jeremy Hunt, the health secretary.

She cited the record of the current Health Secretary as her reason for standing in South West Surrey:

"I've faced Jeremy Hunt in the courts - and beaten him twice. Now I'll face him at the ballot box.

"He needs to be held to account for what he's doing to our NHS and the way in which he has bulldozed democracy, changing the law to push through hospital closures when he was beaten in court.

"I am very concerned that our beloved NHS is being run down, privatised, fragmented and underfunded.

"This is an issue that affects everyone in the country. If we don't all stand up for it now, it will be destroyed."

In March 2015, Queen guitarist Brian May launched the "Common Decency" campaign, naming Irvine alongside six already-serving MPs, saying: "We think you're decent people, we think you represent your constituents and your conscience so we're going to tell our people to try and cluster round and give you support."

In the general election on 7 May 2015, Irvine received 4,851 votes, putting her in fourth place.

In May 2017, a "progressive forum" was organised by the South West Surrey Compass group. This selected Irvine as the candidate best placed to oppose Jeremy Hunt. The Green Party withdrew their candidate and members of the Liberal Democrats and the Labour party agreed not to campaign. Labour promptly expelled three senior local party members on account of their involvement with this alliance.

In the general election on 8 June 2017, Irvine received 12,093 votes, coming second to Hunt, who received 33,683 votes.

== Awards and honours ==
In October 2014, she appeared in the London Evening Standard's "top 1000 most influential people in London" feature, in the section covering campaigners.

In January 2015, she was nominated for the 2015 Sheila McKechnie Foundation campaigning award.

== Personal life ==
Irvine is married to a retired paediatrician and is the mother of two children.
