= Lewis Campbell (classicist) =

Scottish writer and classical scholar (1830–1908)

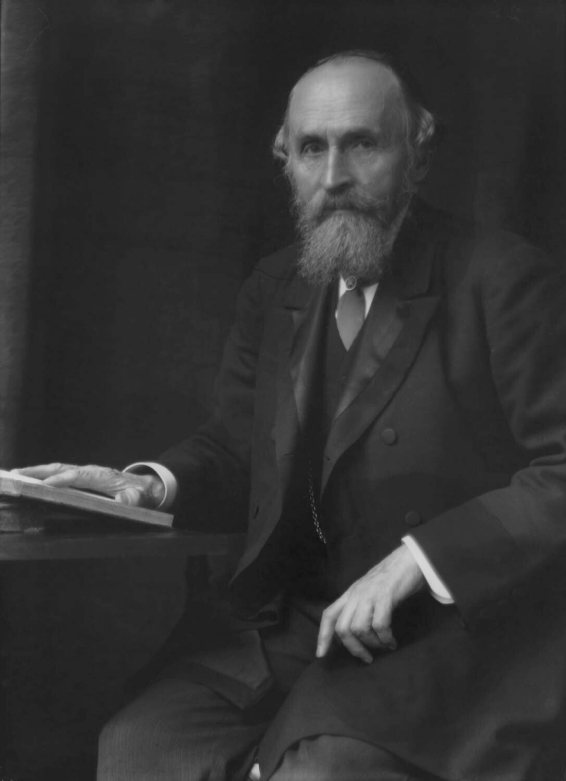
- 1904 photo of Lewis Campbell by George Charles Beresford
- Born: 3 September 1830; Edinburgh, Scotland
- Died: 25 October 1908 (aged 78); Locarno, Switzerland
- Occupations: Writer; scholar

Lewis Campbell (/ˈkæmbəl/; 3 September 1830 – 25 October 1908) was a Scottish writer and classical scholar. He was best known for his works on Sophocles and Plato. His edition of Plato's Republic was well received and is still widely read today. He is also well known for his biography of the physicist James Clerk Maxwell.

== Biography ==
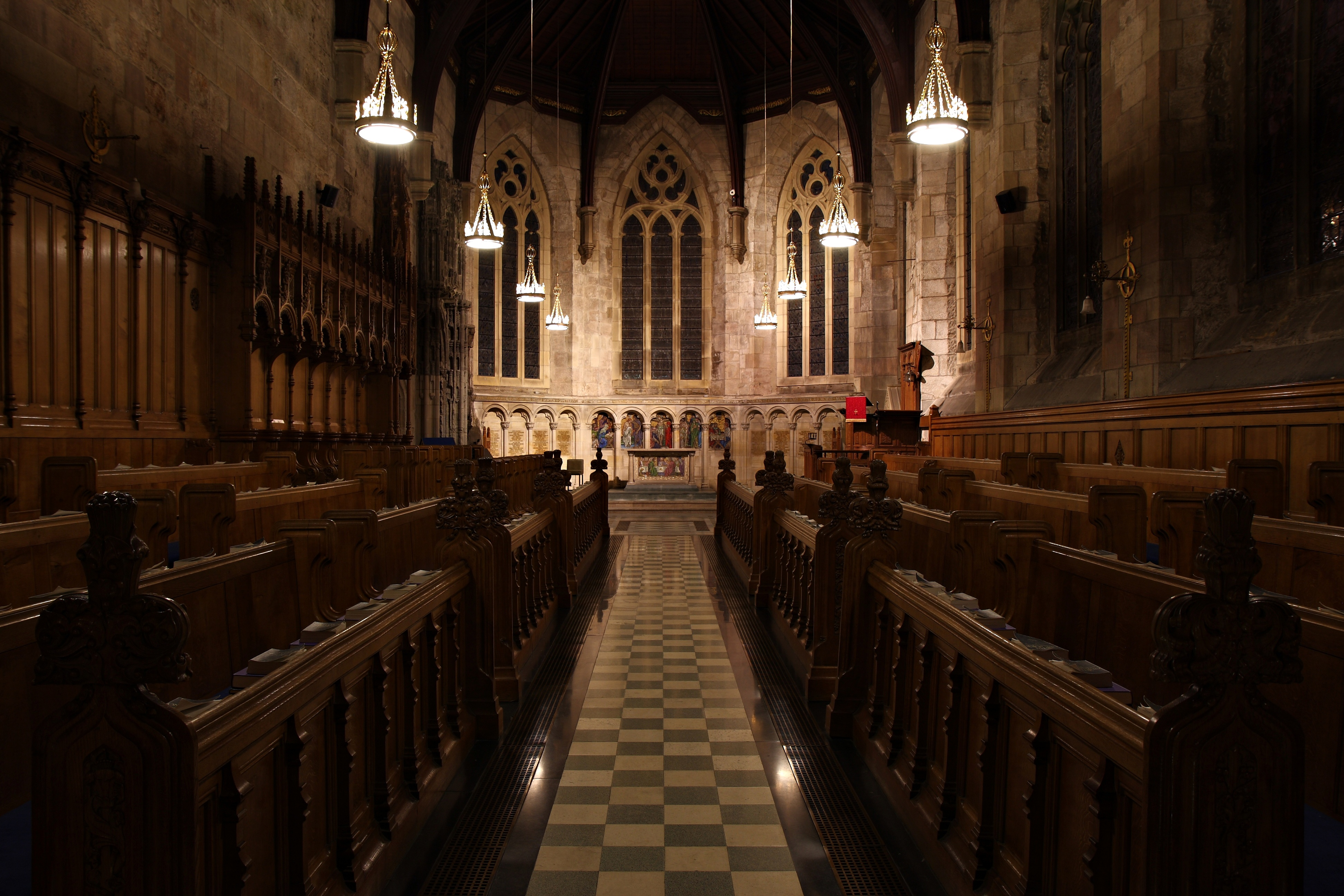
The Rev. Lewis Campbell preached at the University of St Andrews' College Church

Campbell was born in Edinburgh. His father, Robert Campbell, RN, was a first cousin of Thomas Campbell, the poet. His mother was the author Eliza Constantia Campbell. His father died when he was two years of age. In 1844 his mother married Col. Hugh Morrieson.

Campbell was educated at Edinburgh Academy, the University of Glasgow, Trinity College, Oxford and Balliol College, Oxford. He was fellow and tutor of Queen's College, Oxford (1855–1858), vicar of Milford, Hampshire (1858–1863), and professor of Greek at the University of St Andrews (1863–1894). An advocate for the higher education for women, he was closely involved in the foundation of St Leonards School for Girls and was the chairman of the school council from 1886 to 1903. In 1894, he was elected an honorary fellow of Balliol College, Oxford. From 1894 to 1896 at St Andrews, he gave the Gifford Lectures, which were published in 1898.

An Anglican vicar, in October 1893 Campbell was reportedly preaching at the University of St Andrews' College Church which maintains links with the Scottish Episcopalian denomination.

== Works ==
As a scholar he is best known by his work on Sophocles and Plato. His published works include:

- Sophocles Greek text with English notes in two volumes (2nd ed., 1879)
- The Sophistes and Politicus of Plato Greek text with English notes (1867)
- Sophocles, The Seven Plays in English Verse (1883)
- The Theaetetus of Plato Greek text with English notes (1st ed., 1861; 2nd ed., 1883)
- Republic, the Greek text, in three volumes (with Benjamin Jowett, 1894)
- Life and Letters of Benjamin Jowett in two volumes (with Evelyn Abbott, 1897)
- Letters of B. Jowett (1899)
- Life of James Clerk Maxwell, with William Garnett, 1st ed., 1882, (new ed. revised and abridged, 1884)
- A Guide to Greek Tragedy for English Readers (1891)
- Religion in Greek Literature. A Sketch in Outline. London etc.: Longmans, Green, and Co. 1898. OCLC 1170247319 (all editions). (Gifford Lectures for 1894–1896)
- On the Nationalisation of the Old English Universities (1901)
- Verse translations of the plays of Aeschylus (1890)
- Sophocles (1896)
- Plato's Republic Oxford lectures (1902)
- Tragic Drama in Aeschylus, Sophocles and Shakespeare (1904)
- Paralipomena Sophoclea (1907).

Sir W.D. Ross had recognized the importance of stylometric methods in Plato chronology which Campbell had introduced in his editions of the Sophistes and Politicus of 1869. Recent scholars such as Charles H. Kahn and Diskin Clay, have each advanced the ordering and grouping of Plato's dialogues according to the same method.
