= William Garnett (professor) =

British physics professor (1850–1932)

- Born: William Garnett; 30 December 1850; Portsea, Portsmouth, England
- Died: 1 November 1932 (aged 81); Hampstead, London
- Education: City of London School; Royal School of Mines; St John's College, Cambridge (BA)
- Children: James Clerk Maxwell; William John
- Scientific career
- Fields: Experimental physics; Mathematics; Mechanical engineering
- Workplaces: St John's College, Cambridge; University of London; University of Nottingham; Newnham College, Cambridge; Durham University

William Garnett (30 December 1850 – 1 November 1932) was a British professor and educational adviser, specialising in physics and mechanics and taking a special interest in electric street lighting.

== Early years ==
Garnett was born in Portsea, Portsmouth, England in 1850, the son of William Garnett. In January 1863 he entered the City of London School, where he was a pupil of Thomas Hall. In the May 1866 examination, he obtained the first Royal Exhibition, tenable at the Royal School of Mines and College of Chemistry, and during the winter session, he studied under Dr. Edward Frankland and Professor John Tyndall, but in the following year, resigned the Exhibition and returned to the City of London School. He was head of the Maths Sixth Form when future prime minister Asquith was head of the Classical Sixth. In April 1869, he gained the Exhibition for Natural Science at St John's College, Cambridge, and in July of the same year, the Beaufoy Mathematical Scholarship at the City of London School, and commenced residence at St. John's College in October. The following summer, he was first in the competition for Sir James Whitworth's Scholarship for Mechanical Engineering, and in 1871, was elected Foundation Scholar at St. John's College. In January 1873, he took his degree as Fifth Wrangler, and shortly afterwards, on the opening of the Cavendish Laboratory, he was appointed Demonstrator in Experimental Physics by Professor James Clerk Maxwell. In November 1874, he was elected Fellow of St. John's College, and retained his fellowship till his marriage in 1879.

== Career ==
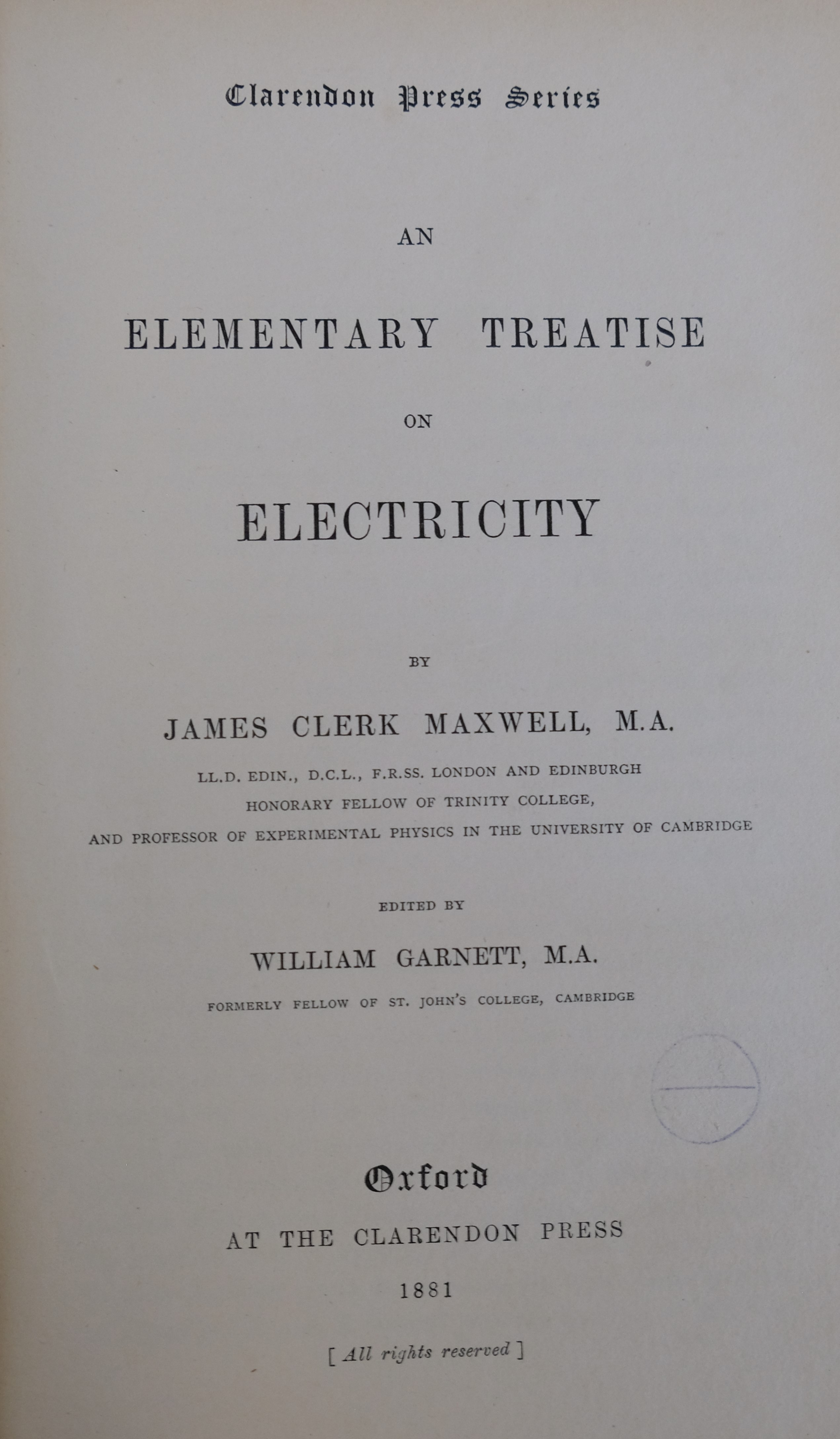
Title page to a 1881 copy of James Clerk Maxwell's "Elementary Treatise on Electricity," which was edited by Garnett

In October 1876, he became a Lecturer in the Cavendish Laboratory, and continued to lecture there upon mechanics, heat, magnetism, and electricity until 1880, when he declined to be reappointed. In April 1879, he was appointed by the Senate Examiner in Natural Philosophy in the University of London. Shortly afterwards, he was appointed Lecturer on Physics at St. John's College. In 1879, 1880, and 1881, he was one of the Examiners in the Natural Sciences Tripos. In April 1882, the Committee of University College, Nottingham, invited him to accept the Professorship of Mathematics, Physics, and Mechanics. Shortly afterwards, he was appointed Electrician to the Nottingham Corporation; he commenced work at Nottingham in October 1882. During the following summer, he organised a system of technical education in connection with the mechanical department of the College, and fitted up a complete set of engineering workshops. He also became a Lecturer on Mechanics and Physics at Newnham College. In November 1883, Garnett was appointed Principal and Professor of Mathematics in the Durham College of Science, Newcastle upon Tyne and began that post the following year; he also assisted in planning and erecting the buildings of Durham College of Science. He served as a member of the Executive Council, and was chairman of the Electric Lighting Committee of the Royal Jubilee Exhibition in Newcastle (1887).

Garnett served as Secretary and Educational Adviser to the Technical Education Board (1893–1904). He was an educational adviser to the London County Council and one of H.M. Commissioners for the Exhibition, as well as serving on the Royal Commission's Science Scholarships Committee (1890–1932). Garnett received an Honorary D.CL. from Durham College, and was an Honorary Member of North of England Institute of Mining and Mechanical Engineers.

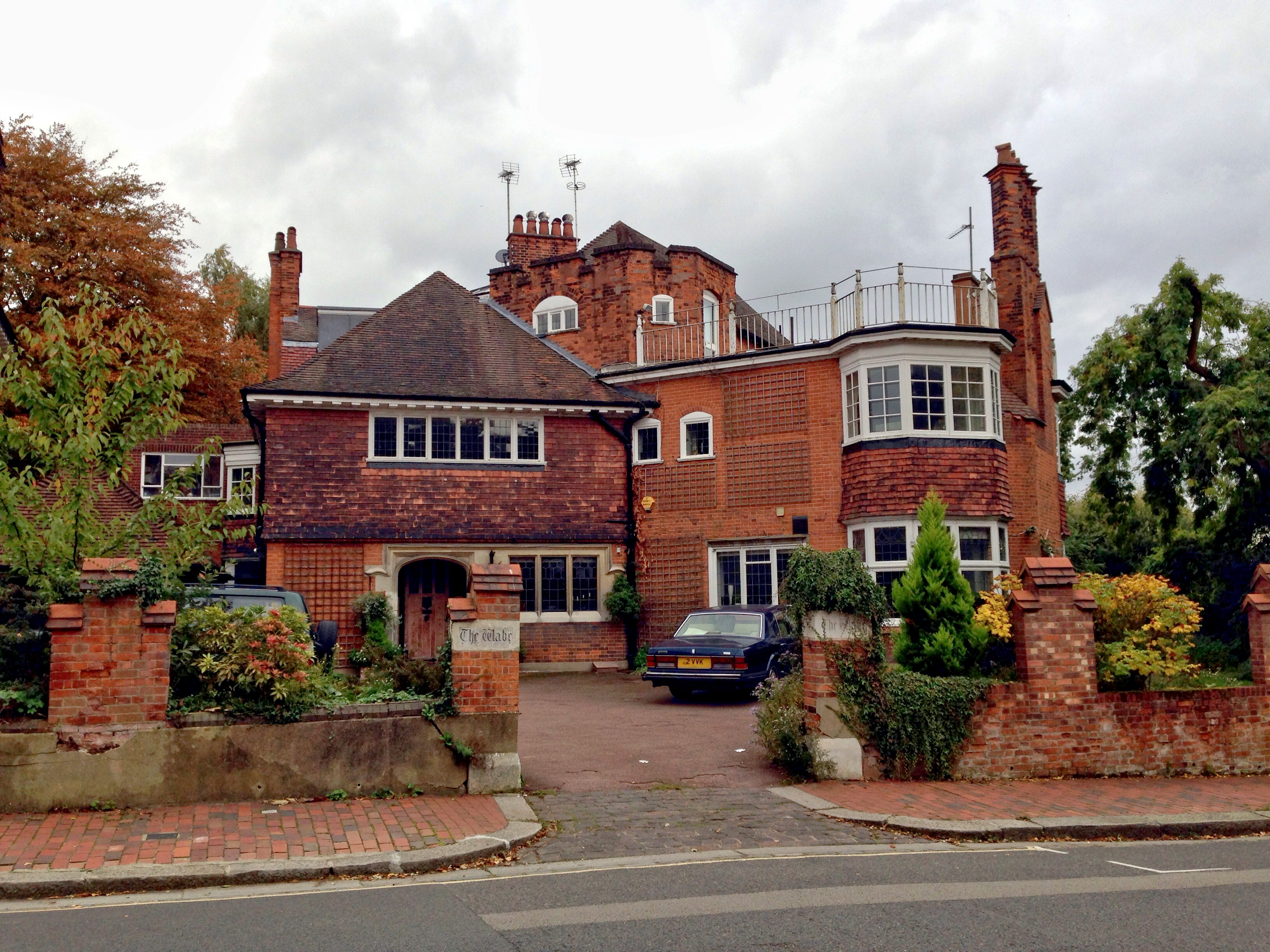
The Wabe, Redington Road, Hampstead, London NW3

In 1902–03, he designed a large house for his family, The Wabe, in Redington Road, Hampstead, London.

== Later years ==
He married Rebecca Samways (1879); they had three sons and two daughters; the eldest was (James Clerk) Maxwell Garnett, C.B.E., general secretary of the League of Nations Union, father of (William) John Poulton Maxwell Garnett, director of The Industrial Society, himself father of Virginia Bottomley. Increasing deafness caused him to resign from his professional affiliations in 1932. He died in the same year. Garnett was a schoolmate and lifelong friend of the British mathematician and physicist, William Mitchinson Hicks.

== Partial List of Works ==
- A treatise on elementary dynamics, for the use of colleges and schools (1875); 2nd edition, revised & enlarged, 1879
- Elementary Mechanics (1876)
- An elementary treatise on electricity by J. C. Maxwell (1881), edited by Garnett
- Life of James Clerk Maxwell, with Lewis Campbell, 1st ed., 1882 (new ed. revised and abridged, 1884)
- Heroes of Science—Physicists (1885)
- An elementary treatise on heat; 6th edition (1893)
