= Absolutely Anything =

2015 British science fantasy comedy film

- Theatrical release poster
- Directed by: Terry Jones
- Written by: Terry Jones; Gavin Scott
- Produced by: Bill Jones; Ben Timlett
- Starring: Simon Pegg; Kate Beckinsale; Sanjeev Bhaskar; Rob Riggle; Eddie Izzard; Joanna Lumley; John Cleese; Terry Gilliam; Eric Idle; Terry Jones; Michael Palin; Robin Williams
- Cinematography: Peter Hannan
- Edited by: Julian Rodd
- Music by: George Fenton
- Production companies: Bill and Ben Productions; GFM Films; Premiere Picture
- Distributed by: Lionsgate
- Release dates: 14 August 2015 (United Kingdom); 12 May 2017 (United States)
- Running time: 86 minutes
- Country: United Kingdom
- Language: English
- Box office: $6.3 million

Absolutely Anything is a 2015 British science fantasy comedy film directed by Terry Jones, from a script he wrote with Gavin Scott. It stars Simon Pegg, Kate Beckinsale, Sanjeev Bhaskar, Rob Riggle, Eddie Izzard and Joanna Lumley, with the nonhuman characters' voices provided by John Cleese, Terry Gilliam, Eric Idle, Jones, Michael Palin and Robin Williams. It was the first movie to feature all living Monty Python members since Monty Python's The Meaning of Life (1983), and the first without Graham Chapman, who died in 1989.

Principal photography and production began on 24 March 2014 and ended on 12 May that year. The film was released in the United Kingdom on 14 August 2015 by Lionsgate UK, and in the United States on 12 May 2017, grossing $6.3 million worldwide. It mainly received negative reviews from critics.

This was the last film to involve Jones, five years before his death in 2020. It was also the last film with Williams in the main cast, released a year after his death in 2014.

== Plot ==
A space probe containing information about the human race is found by the alien galactic council. They debate whether to destroy the Earth or make humanity a member of the council. As a test, they will give one random human limitless power to do "absolutely anything". After ten days, if the powers were used for evil, Earth will be destroyed.

The chosen human is Neil Clarke, a teacher struggling under Headmaster Mr Robinson at a school in London. Neil has a crush on his neighbour, Catherine West. Oblivious to his new power, Neil wishes for aliens to destroy the classroom of students hated by him, which indeed causes an alien spaceship to kill everyone in that classroom.

Perplexed, Neil tests himself to find out that he can do anything. To fix the deaths of his students he wishes that "everyone who died come back to life", causing all dead people to rise as zombies; he reverses this, asking that the explosion never happened, reversing all previous wishes. Next day he wishes for another teacher, Miss Pringle, to worship his friend Ray, who is too shy to tell her he likes her.

Neil uses his power for petty personal gains and to give his dog Dennis the ability to speak. One night, the galactic power glitches, failing to make Catherine fall in love with Neil, but then coincidentally Catherine knocks at his door. They spend the night together and her stalker ex-boyfriend, Colonel Grant sees them.

Catherine hears Dennis shouting that he loves Neil, making her think that Neil has a boyfriend. Ray says that Miss Pringle doesn't love him romantically, instead she worships him as a god. Catherine locks Grant in her apartment. Neil breaks Grant's arm and then fixes it, revealing his ability to grant wishes whenever he says a wish and makes a hand gesture. Grant kidnaps Neil, tying him up and gagging him to prevent his escape, and then forces him to grant some selfish or absurd wishes (such as giving all pasty-white English people huge ears and duck feet and giving police pink uniforms), threatening to shoot Dennis.

Catherine and Ray rescue Neil who reverses all of the wishes, including Miss Pringle's now violently fanatical worship of Ray, who was close to being ritually killed by her and the cult she created. Catherine angrily tells Neil that she could never love anyone so controlling. Disheartened, Neil decides to use his powers to solve the world's problems; he grants everyone in the world as much food as they want, says that wars shouldn't happen for any reason, grants every person their own dream house and wishes for the reversion of global warming.

However, this backfires when worldwide obesity flares, all land is taken over for houses, several countries declare war for no reason (as opposed to "any reason"), and the planet falls into a global ice age. Neil reverses all these wishes. Disheartened with his personal life and futile attempts to make the world a better place he attempts suicide, but as he jumps into the Thames, Dennis jumps in after him and Neil is forced to rescue the dog and by consequence himself. Afterward, Dennis says that Neil should give the power to him, as he never thinks of anything selfish. Neil does so.

Meanwhile, the aliens decide that Earth is not worthy. It turns out that the galactic council has an inverted understanding of morality - it sees dominance as good, and weakness as evil, with Neil trying to end wars and make the life of others better being a sign of weakness. They decide to destroy Earth, but Dennis wishes that the source of power be destroyed, causing the doom weapon of the council to bounce back to the alien ship, killing them all. With no power left, but full of confidence, the next day Neil asks Catherine out, to which she agrees. Dennis is revealed to still have his powers, given he only asked for the source of the powers to be destroyed, and not the powers themselves.

== Cast ==
- Simon Pegg as Neil Clarke
- Kate Beckinsale as Catherine West
- Sanjeev Bhaskar as Ray
- Rob Riggle as Colonel Grant Kotchev
- Robert Bathurst as James Cleverill
- Eddie Izzard as Headmaster, Mr. Robinson
- Joanna Lumley as Fenella
- Marianne Oldham as Rosie
- Emma Pierson as Miss Pringle
- Meera Syal as Fiona Blackwell
- Mojo the Dog as Dennis the Dog
- Brian Cox as Himself (cameo)

=== Voice cast ===
- John Cleese as Chief Alien
- Terry Gilliam as Nasty Alien
- Eric Idle as Salubrious Gat
- Terry Jones as Scientist Alien (Note: Terry Jones also played a van driver in the film.)
- Michael Palin as Kindly Alien
- Robin Williams as Dennis the Dog

== Production ==
=== Development ===
In a March 2014, interview with Empire, Terry Jones spoke about the plot of the film. He described it as being about Neil, a teacher in a failing secondary school, who is given the ability to make anything happen by asking it to. He only realizes he has this after saying "I'd make an alien spaceship hit class 10C and vaporize them" to a colleague, only to hear an explosion elsewhere in the school and find 10C's classroom destroyed.

Jones credited the film's idea to the H. G. Wells story "The Man Who Could Work Miracles", but said that it "just changed out of all recognition from that". He also explained that the script for the film has been around for 20 years, saying: "I just think it's my own baby really. But I wrote it with Gavin Scott, and we've been writing it for 20 years, then Mike Medavoy rang up in 2010 or so and asked what scripts I had hidden in my bottom desk drawer. So I pulled out Absolutely Everything – not literally, of course – and here we are." He also spoke about the character Dennis the Dog, saying: "I think he's going to steal the show. We've got a real dog, Mojo, who is very obedient, and a wonderful dog, a mongrel, but CGI work will be done. Simon Pegg is a big dog fan, and him and Mojo get on very well. Before Douglas Adams died, he looked over the script and he said that Dennis the Dog's scenes were the funniest scenes..." He also spoke about the designs of the alien characters, saying: "James Acheson is doing the costumes, and he has already got a wonderful array of aliens of different sizes and shapes. The story behind the aliens is they intercept the Voyager space craft as it leaves the solar system [and] comes into intergalactic space – well, it isn't really intergalactic space, but we pretend it is, anyway – and they say they have to assess one Earthling at random by giving them these powers. They pick Neil."

=== Casting ===
On 14 September 2010, the film was first announced, and it was also announced that John Oliver, Robin Williams, John Cleese, Michael Palin, and Terry Gilliam were cast in the film, with Eric Idle announced as joining his fellow Pythons on 20 February 2014. In January 2012, it was announced that film would begin filming in spring 2012. On 11 December 2013, Simon Pegg was cast as the lead character Neil Clarke. On 26 February 2014, Kate Beckinsale was cast in the film. On 19 March 2014, Rob Riggle was cast in the film.

=== Filming ===
Principal photography and production began on 24 March 2014, and ended on 12 May 2014. Director Jones said "It was 6 weeks shoot [sic] and it was shot in London. We took over a disused school in Hornsey Lane, which is not far from my house. We built the studios in there and used it as a base. Then, we shot the interiors of the flats in Earl's Court." On 28 March 2014, it was announced that Lionsgate UK would distribute the film in the United Kingdom.

== Music ==
Australian singer Kylie Minogue recorded and released a promotional single, "Absolutely Anything and Anything at All", for the soundtrack. A music video was released on Minogue's official YouTube channel.

British composer and member of Queen, Roger Taylor performed the title song.

== Release ==
The film was released in the United Kingdom on 14 August 2015, by Lionsgate UK and released in the United States on 12 May 2017, by the same company.

== Reception ==
On Rotten Tomatoes, the film received an approval rating of 18% based on 44 reviews, with an average rating of 3.8/10. Its consensus states "Given the impressive array of talent involved in Absolutely Anything—and the near-total lack of laughs it provokes—this Monty Python reunion can only be regarded as a disappointment". On Metacritic the film received a weighted average score of 31 out of 100 based on 9 reviews, indicating "generally unfavorable reviews".

Peter Bradshaw of The Guardian awarded the film 1/5 star, and said "cheap and cheerless sci-fi comedy. There's a blue-chip cast here, and it's directed by Terry Jones; the Pythons have cameos, as creepy alien creatures. But this low-budget Brit film is just depressing, a sub-Douglas Adams sci-fi comedy which looks like mediocre kids' TV with a dismal script and cheap'n'cheerless production values. A huge amount of talent here. Sadly it goes nowhere." James Mottram of The List also awarded the film 1 star, and said "Simon Pegg and Kate Beckinsale head up an awful sci-fi comedy from Terry Jones. It'd be very sad if this is the last Python collaboration to hit screens."
