= Eliza Constantia Campbell =

Welsh author (1796–1864)

Eliza Constantia Campbell (née Pryce; 8 January 1796 – 1864) was a Welsh author.

Campbell was the daughter of Richard Pryce, Esq., of Gunley, Montgomeryshire. She was married twice: first, in 1827, to Commander Robert Campbell, R.N., of Edinburgh. Their son was the classical scholar Lewis Campbell. Pryce died in 1832.

In 1833, Campbell published a collection of her stories titled Stories from the History of Wales, under the pseudonym "A Lady of the Principality"; It was reissued in 1837 as Tales about Wales.

Campbell married Col. Hugh Morrieson, E.I.C. He died in 1859.

Campbell died in 1864. The National Gallery of Scotland holds a significant number of her prints.
