= Iwill Campaign =

The #iwill campaign (now the #iwill Movement) was a UK-wide campaign, set up in November 2013 by its coordinating charity Step Up to Serve, which seeks to increase participation in social action by young people aged 10–25. Social action is defined as volunteering, campaigning or fundraising. Its goal is to increase the numbers of young people engaged in social action by 50% by 2020, meaning that 60% of all young people would be regularly engaging in social action by that time.

The campaign is driven by creating partnerships with businesses, education, voluntary and public sector organisations. These organisations, of which there are roughly five-hundred, assert their affiliation to the campaign by making an #iwill pledge of their intentions, which is then visible on the #iwill campaign's website, and may be individually promoted by the organisations themselves. The #iwill campaign was given cross-party support by David Cameron, Nick Clegg and Ed Miliband, and was referenced in the pre-election manifestos of both Conservative and Labour parties in the run up to the 2015 general election. The Prince of Wales's Charitable Foundation contributes to the campaign, with King Charles III (then Prince of Wales) acting as patron to the campaign.

The three main activities of the campaign are:

- Communicating the value of youth social action and undertaking research to further understand the current position of youth social action in the UK.
- Integrating youth social actions into all young persons’ experiences, through schools, colleges and youth clubs etc.
- Improving the provision of youth social action opportunities.

The #iwill campaign achieves much of its impact through its partner organisations, who support the campaigns goals in their own work, as well as contributing to the decision making of the campaign by participating in steering groups. Significant partner organisations include O2, Lloyds Bank, Trinity Mirror, Vinspired, Duke of Edinburgh's Award, The Mayor of London and the Department for Education, among others. Individual schools such as Bethnal Green Academy have implemented the campaign's aims by developing and heavily promoting social action activities within and outside of school.

The #iwill campaign was managed by the Step Up to Serve staff, headed by CEO Charlotte Hill, and supported by a board of trustees including Step Up To Serve founders Dame Julia Cleverdon DCVO, CBE and Amanda Jordan OBE. Each year, the campaign accepts up to 100 young people involved in social action to act as ambassadors. One of these is Ayrton Cable, a young activist for human and animal rights, who has received several awards for his work in campaigning and activism.

As of 2021, the campaign has evolved into the #iwill Movement, and is coordinated by UK Youth and Volunteering Matters following the dissolution of Step Up to Serve.
