= James Garnett (cricketer) =

English cricketer

James Garnett (24 October 1809 – 4 January 1842) played first-class cricket for Cambridge University in two matches in 1833. Garnett was of English descent, but he was born in Bridgetown, Barbados and died in Scarborough, Tobago.

Garnett played in two matches in the space of eight days, batting in the Cambridge University middle order in both of them; he failed to score in either innings in his first match, but scored 20 and 21 in his second game. His batting style is not known and there is no record whether he bowled or not; there are no extant records of appearances in other major or minor cricket matches.

Alumni Cantabrigienses, the directory of Cambridge University students, identifies Garnett as the son of William Garnett, rector of St Michael's Church, Barbados (now the Cathedral Church of Saint Michael and All Angels). He was educated privately in Winchmore Hill, Middlesex and at Trinity College, Cambridge.
