= Maxwell Garnett =

English educationalist, barrister, peace campaigner (1880–1958)

Maxwell Garnett CBE
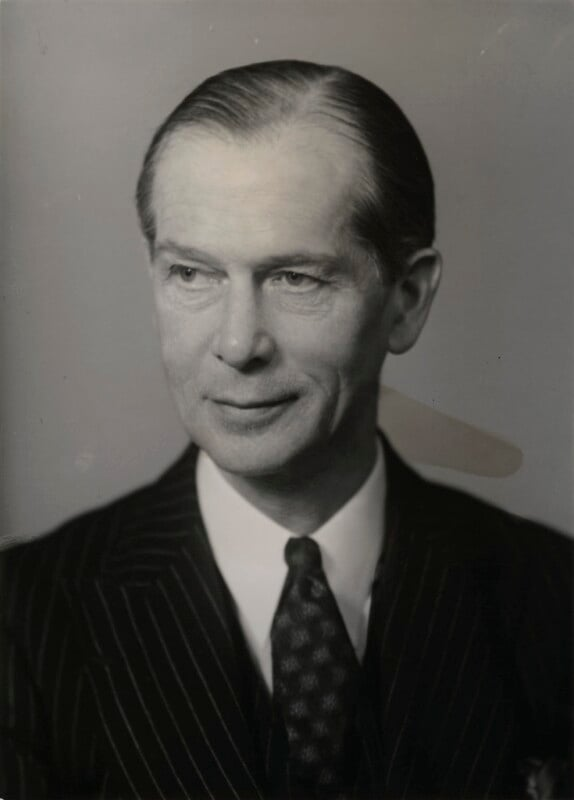
- Garnett in 1944
- Born: James Clerk Maxwell Garnett; 13 October 1880; Cherry Hinton, Cambridge, United Kingdom
- Died: 19 March 1958 (aged 77); Isle of Wight, United Kingdom
- Education: St Paul's School, London
- Alma mater: Trinity College, Cambridge
- Occupations: Barrister; physicist; educationist; activist
- Known for: Maxwell Garnett approximation
- Children: Peggy Jay
- Father: William Garnett

James Clerk Maxwell Garnett CBE (13 October 1880 – 19 March 1958), commonly known as Maxwell Garnett, was an English educationist, barrister, peace campaigner and physicist. He was Secretary of the League of Nations Union. The Maxwell Garnett approximation is named after him.

== Early life ==
Garnett was born on 13 October 1880 at Cherry Hinton, Cambridge, England, the son of physicist William Garnett, and was named after his father's friend James Clerk Maxwell. He was educated at St Paul's School, London, and Trinity College, Cambridge, gaining scholarships at both.

At Cambridge, Garnett worked in optics, publishing papers on the optical properties of metals and metal glasses in the early years of the new century.

== Career ==
He came up with Maxwell Garnett approximation for effective mediums in 1904.

Garnett was an examiner at the Board of Trade from 1904 to 1912, during which time he was called to the bar from the Inner Temple in 1908. He was Principal of the Manchester College of Technology from 1912 to 1920, then returned to the capital city as Secretary of the League of Nations Union from 1920 to 1938).

His daughter Peggy was later convinced that her father's career was "wrecked by his gift for launching daringly radical and eventually successful new ideas two decades too soon."

== Personal life ==
In 1910, Garnett married Margaret Lucy Poulton, daughter of the evolutionary biologist Sir Edward Poulton FRS, in Headington, Oxford. They had six children, including Peggy Jay. The Garnetts lived at 37 Park Town, North Oxford, from 1939 until 1955, when they moved to the Isle of Wight.

Garnett died at his Isle of Wight home on 19 March 1958; after a funeral at St Helen's Church his body was cremated at Southampton and his cremated remains were then set in the transept floor of the church.

== Honours ==
Garnett was appointed a Commander of the Order of the British Empire in 1919.

== Selected publications ==
Journal papers

- Maxwell Garnett, J. C. (1904). "Colours in metal glasses and in metallic films". Philosophical Transactions of the Royal Society. 203 (359–371): 385–420. Bibcode:1904RSPTA.203..385G. doi:10.1098/rsta.1904.0024.
- Maxwell Garnett, J. C. (1906). "Colours in metal glasses, in metallic films, and in metallic solutions". Philosophical Transactions of the Royal Society. 205 (387–401): 237–288. Bibcode:1906RSPTA.205..237G. doi:10.1098/rsta.1906.0007.
