= Gavin Scott =

English novelist, broadcaster and screenwriter

- Born: 1950 (age 75–76); Kingston upon Hull, England
- Education: Victoria University of Wellington
- Occupations: Director, screenwriter, television producer
- Writing career
- Period: 1992–present
- Genres: Comedy, drama, adventure, science fiction

Gavin Duncan Scott (born 1950) is an English novelist, broadcaster and writer of the Emmy-winning mini-series The Mists of Avalon, Small Soldiers, The Borrowers and Legend of Earthsea. He spent ten years making films for British television before becoming a screenwriter, creating more than two hundred documentaries and short films for BBC and the commercial TV, including UK’s prestigious Channel 4. His first assignment in the United States was with George Lucas, developing and scripting The Young Indiana Jones Chronicles. His work ranges from family entertainment to comedy, science fiction and historical dramas.

Scott wrote Krakatoa, a Titanic-style movie for National Geographic Feature Films, and an eight-hour adaptation of War and Peace for Lux Vida SPA, directed by Robert Dornhelm (Into the West, The Ten Commandments).

He created and executive produced a 22-part television series set in the nineteenth century about the origins of the creative ideas of Jules Verne, which was broadcast around the world.

In 2006, his children's film Treasure Island Kids: The Battle for Treasure Island, starring Randy Quaid, was released on DVD.

Born in Hull, Yorkshire, Gavin emigrated with his family to New Zealand in 1961. At 17 he spent a year as a volunteer teacher in the jungles of Borneo, working with the children of head-hunters, after which he studied history and political science at Victoria University of Wellington, and journalism at the Wellington Polytechnic. He returned to Britain overland across Asia in 1973, traveling through Sri Lanka, Kashmir, Afghanistan and Iran, and worked for Shelter, the British housing charity, before joining the Times Educational Supplement, from which base he also wrote features for The Times.

After five years as a reporter and presenter for BBC Radio, Gavin began in 1980 making films for BBC Television’s Newsnight, covering literary as well as political subjects; among his interviewees, J.B. Priestley, Christopher Isherwood, Iris Murdoch and John Fowles. He then made documentaries on science and culture for series such as Horizon and Man Alive before joining Channel 4 News, for which he made films until 1990.

Following the death of Maurice Macmillan in 1984, son of the former British Prime Minister and MP for Surrey South West Harold Macmillan, Gavin Scott was selected and stood as a Liberal here at the Parliamentary Byelection for the Liberal/SDP Alliance and came within 2,600 votes of taking the seat from the Conservative candidate Virginia Bottomley who went on to serve in John Major's cabinet.

It was during this time that he started writing novels, including Hot Pursuit, about a Russian satellite that crashed in New Zealand, and A Flight of Lies, about the hunt for the bones of Peking Man. He has recently written a Dickensian historical novel set in the nineteenth century, The Adventures of Toby Wey. He also had a stint at ITN as a reporter/newsreader in the late 1980s.

With Terry Jones, he co-created the animated television series Blazing Dragons (1996–1998). Reversing a medieval fantasy trope, the series' main characters are anthropomorphic dragons beset by evil humans.

Gavin is also a sculptor, creating shadow boxes similar to those of Joseph Cornell, using mass-produced toys as his medium. He lives with his family in Santa Monica, California, and recently finished writing the script of Absolutely Anything with Terry Jones.

== Writing credits ==
Production	Notes	Broadcaster
The Young Indiana Jones Chronicles	"Barcelona, May 1917" (1992); "Petrograd, July 1917" (1993); "Prague, August 1917" (1993)	ABC
Thatcherworld	Short film (1993)	BBC2
Space Rangers	"The Trial" (1994)	CBS
The Borrowers	Feature film (1997)	N/A
Small Soldiers	Feature film (1998)	N/A
The Secret Adventures of Jules Verne	22 episodes (2000)	CBC
The Mists of Avalon	Television miniseries (2001)	TNT
Legend of Earthsea	Television miniseries (2004)	Sci-Fi Channel
Treasure Island Kids: The Battle of Treasure Island	Feature film (2006)	N/A
War and Peace	Television miniseries (2007)	RAI
Beauty and the Beast	Feature film (2009)	N/A
Absolutely Anything	Feature film (co-written with Terry Jones, 2015)	N/A

== Awards and nominations ==
Year	Award	Work	Category	Result	Reference
2002	Writers Guild of America Awards	The Mists of Avalon	Adapted Long Form	Nominated	
