= The Work Foundation =

British non-profit organisation

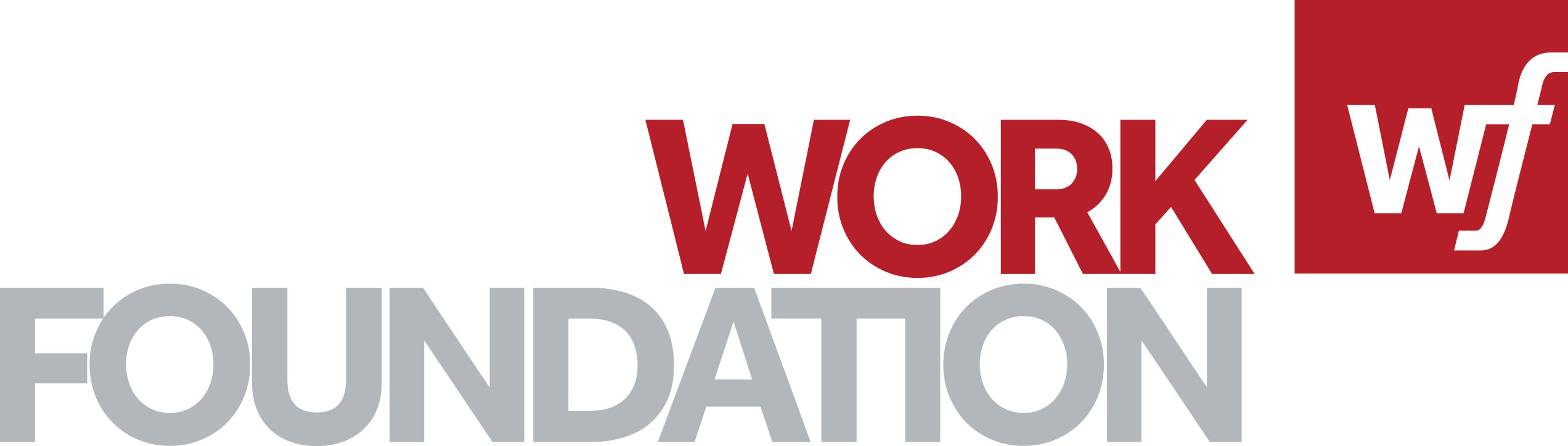
- Founded: 3 April 1918; 108 years ago
- Founder: Robert Hyde
- Type: Think tank
- Purpose: Improvement of economic performance and quality of working life
- Region served: UK, Ireland
- Method: Publications, consultancy and advocacy
- Revenue: £5.98m
- Website: www.theworkfoundation.com

The Work Foundation is a British not-for-profit organisation and independent authority providing advice, consultancy and research on the future of work, improving the quality of working life, leadership, economic and organisational effectiveness. The foundation works with government, business organisations, the public sector, and not-for-profit institutions. It operates with opinion formers, policy makers and partner organisations through forums and networks, consultations and publications.

It was founded in 1918 as the Boys Welfare Association later becoming the Industrial Society. In 2002 it was renamed the Work Foundation, shifting its business model away from being a training organisation towards being a research, consultancy and policy think tank under the leadership of former Observer Editor Will Hutton. Its reports on various aspects of the labour market are often cited by the media. Ian Brinkley has replaced Stephen Bevan in the new position of director. In 2008 Stephen Bevan replaced Hutton as managing director, with Hutton becoming executive vice-chair. The Work Foundation was acquired in October 2010 by Lancaster University following a winding up petition in the High Court. Hutton was criticised for his handling of the Foundation by a number of publications including The Sunday Times and Private Eye.

== History ==
On 3 April 1918 the Reverend Robert Hyde founded what was initially called the Boys’ Welfare Association. Prior to this he had worked with the poor of Hoxton, London - a deprived, slum area. As part of his work he has managed boys' clubs in London's East End. He joined the Ministry of Munitions during the first world war working as a civil servant dealing with the social conditions of the munitions workers. As a consequence he had gained first hand experience of appalling workplace conditions.

As a result of this knowledge he sought to improve working conditions for the boys and young men employed in munitions plants. Hyde genuinely believed that benign employers and industrial harmony had the capacity to create as much wealth as harsh taskmasters and conflict. He also sought to 'provide proper facilities for the maximum enjoyment of the Workers' free time'.

In 1919 the Boys' Welfare Association changed its name to the Industrial Welfare Society; this signified an extension of its activities. Much of the Society’s work in the 1920s and 1930s involved the struggle for what is now considered very basic, such as employer-provided lunchrooms and restrooms. It was greatly helped by the willingness of Prince Albert to be President. He was very willing to involve himself through his own personal participation. He visited between 120 and 150 workplaces around the country between 1920 and 1935. He organized and partially attended the Duke of York Boys’ Camps - camps set up for both working class and public school boys. In addition he attended or sent a letter to every annual meeting of the society until his accession to the throne as George VI in 1936, at which point he became the organization's Patron. The Industrial Society was granted a Royal Charter in 1984. Robert Hyde continued as head of the Society until his retirement in 1948. Prince Philip, Duke of Edinburgh became the Patron of the Industrial Society in 1952.

Robert Hyde's replacement was John Marsh, who remained as Director until 1962. Under Marsh's direction the Society turned more positively from the provision of good physical working conditions to the fostering of good human relations in industry. In 1962 John Garnett became Director and in 1965 the name was shortened to "The Industrial Society". John Garnett was Director until 1986, and under his leadership the Society obtained an increasingly high-profile. It was briefly in charge of the "I'm Backing Britain" campaign in 1968. On John Garnett's retirement, Alistair Graham became Chief Executive, followed in 1991 by Rhiannon Chapman and in 1994 by Tony Morgan who oversaw a series of rejuvenatory reforms. The failing financial circumstances of the society were addressed and new training programs and conferences were instituted.

=== Decline ===
In 2000 a new management team was put in place with Will Hutton as CEO and David Pearson as chief operating officer. In 2001 Pearson led the sale of the Society's loss-making training division to Capita for over 23 million pounds, reviving the ailing balance sheet and saving the pension fund. The Industrial Society was in turn renamed the Work Foundation in 2002, focusing on consultancy and advocacy. Pearson retired in February 2003, confident that the future of the charity, with its strong balance sheet, was secured, based on a re-adjustment between the number of employees and their income generating potential, which subsequently did not occur. In 2008 Stephen Bevan replaced Hutton as managing director, with Hutton becoming executive vice-chair.

As a result of Hutton's poor business strategy and leadership, and chairman/banker Peter Ellwood’s inadequate control and leadership of the board, much of the proceeds of the training division sale was unprofitably utilised and in 2010 the Work Foundation ceased to be financially viable. The society spent more in salaries than it received in income, and eventually a winding-up petition due to insolvency was filed in the High Court, citing a pension deficit. On 21 October 2010 the Work Foundation was acquired by Lancaster University for an undisclosed sum. At the time of the purchase the pension fund which had about 600 members, including a number of the 43 current employees, had a funding deficit of £27m. It was indicated that the two institutions would build on a record of previous collaboration between the university's business school and the Work Foundation, which would continue to operate from its headquarters in Palmer Street, Westminster.

== Current activity ==
The Work Foundation is focused on promoting the concept of "Good Work" - the notion that good quality jobs lead to higher productivity, improved quality of working life, improved employee engagement and better workplace health and well-being. In 2011 The Work Foundation published the findings of its Good Work Commission. Current research priorities include work on youth unemployment and labour market disadvantage, workforce health and wellbeing, flexible working and local economic development.
