= 1971 Birthday Honours =

British government recognitions

The 1971 Queen's Birthday Honours were appointments to orders and decorations of the Commonwealth realms to reward and highlight citizens' good works, on the occasion of the official birthday of Queen Elizabeth II. They were announced in supplements to The London Gazette of 4 June 1971 for the United Kingdom, Australia, New Zealand, Mauritius, and Fiji.

At this time, honours for Australians were awarded both in the United Kingdom honours on the advice of the premiers of Australian states, and also in a separate Australia honours list.

The recipients of honours are displayed here as they were styled before their new honour, and arranged by honour, with classes (Knight, Knight Grand Cross, etc.) and then divisions (Military, Civil, etc.) as appropriate.

== United Kingdom and Commonwealth ==
=== Life peer ===
==== Baron ====
- Major The Right Honourable James Dawson Chichester-Clark, DL, MP, lately Prime Minister of Northern Ireland.

=== Privy Counsellor ===
- The Honourable John Douglas Anthony, MP, Deputy Prime Minister and Minister for Trade and Industry, Commonwealth of Australia.
- Sir Robert Grant Grant-Ferris, MP, Chairman of Ways and Means, House of Commons.
- Dr the Honourable Sir Seewoosagur Ramgoolam, MLA, Prime Minister, Minister of Defence and Internal Security, and Minister of Information and Broadcasting of Mauritius.

=== Knight Bachelor ===
- Ove Nyquist Arup, CBE. For services to Civil Engineering.
- Anthony George Bernard Burney, OBE, Senior Partner, Binder Hamlyn & Co., Chartered Accountants.
- John Allen Clark, Chairman and Chief Executive, Plessey Co. Ltd. For services to Export.
- Charles Clore. For charitable services.
- Peter Averell Daniell, TD, Senior Partner, Mullens & Co., and Government Broker.
- John Henry Harris Davis, Chairman and Chief Executive, The Rank Organisation Ltd.
- William Richard Shaboe Doll, OBE, Regius Professor of Medicine, University of Oxford.
- Norman William Graham, CB, Secretary, Scottish Education Department.
- Fred Harvey Hutty. For services to Education.
- Harry Ernest Jones, CBE, Agent of the Government of Northern Ireland in Great Britain.
- William Emrys Jones, Director General, Agricultural Development and Advisory Service, Ministry of Agriculture, Fisheries and Food.
- John Towersey Lidbury, Deputy Managing Director, Hawker Siddeley Group Ltd. For services to Export.
- Michael James Lighthill, Lucasian Professor of Mathematics, University of Cambridge.
- Charles Patrick Home McCall, MBE, TD, DL, Clerk to the Lancashire County Council.
- George Gray Macfarlane, CB, Controller of Research, Ministry of Defence.
- James Wilson McKay, Lord Provost of Edinburgh.
- Godfrey William Rowland Morley, OBE, TD, President, The Law Society.
- Thomas Alexander Fraser Noble, MBE, Vice-Chancellor, University of Leicester.
- Basil Arthur Parkes, OBE. For services to the fishing industry.
- Arthur Desmond Herne Plummer, TD, DL, Leader of the Greater London Council.
- Edward Evan Evans-Pritchard, lately Professor of Social Anthropology, University of Oxford.
- Terence Mervyn Rattigan, CBE, Playwright.
- Samuel Conrad Seward, OBE, Director, Stone-Platt Industries Ltd. For services to Export.
- Henry Martin Smith, CBE, HM Chief Inspector of Fire Services, Home Office.
- Percy Stephenson. For political and public services in Lancashire.
- Terence George Ward, CBE. For services to Dental Surgery.
- Richard James Webster, DSO. For political services.

Diplomatic Service and Overseas List

- Colonel the Honourable John Douglas Clague, CBE, MC, QPM, TD. For public services in Hong Kong.
- James Olva Georges, OBE. For public services in the British Virgin Islands.
- The Honourable Mr. Justice Louis Georges Souyave, Chief Justice, Seychelles.

Australian States
State of New South Wales

- John Worroker Austin. For services to industry.
- Lincoln Carruthers Hynes, OBE. For services to the community.
- John Robert Walton. For services to commerce.

State of Victoria

- Willis Henry Connolly, CBE, of St. Kilda. For long and distinguished service with the State Electricity Commission of Victoria.
- Philip Frederick Jones, of Toorak. For services to journalism.

State of Queensland

- Leslie Charles Thiess, CBE, of Brisbane. For services to the coal export industry and for his philanthropic activities.

=== Order of the Bath ===
==== Knight Grand Cross of the Order of the Bath (GCB) ====
Civil Division

- Sir Edmund Gerald Compton, KCB, KBE, lately Parliamentary Commissioner for Administration.

==== Knight Commander of the Order of the Bath (KCB) ====
Military Division

- Vice Admiral Anthony Templer Frederick Griffin, CB, Royal Navy.
- Vice Admiral Robert George Raper, CB, Royal Navy.
- Lieutenant-General Harry Craufurd Tuzo, OBE, MC, late Royal Regiment of Artillery.
- Air Marshal Harry Burton CB, CBE, DSO, Royal Air Force.

Civil Division

- Kenneth Ernest Berrill, Chairman, University Grants Committee.
- Robert Braithwaite Marshall, CB, MBE, Second Permanent Secretary, Department of Trade and Industry.

==== Companion of the Order of the Bath (CB) ====
Military Division

Royal Navy

- Rear Admiral Edward Findlay Gueritz, OBE, DSC.
- Rear Admiral James Percy Knowles Harkness.
- Surgeon Rear Admiral Nicol Sinclair Hepburn, CBE, QHP.
- Rear Admiral Frederick Charles William Lawson, DSC.
- Rear Admiral Richard Douglas Roberts.
- Rear Admiral Arthur Rodney Barry Sturdee, DSC.

Army

- Major-General Richard Lewis Clutterbuck, OBE, late Corps of Royal Engineers.
- Major-General Jack Raymond Reynolds, OBE, ERD, late Royal Army Service Corps, now R.A.R.O.
- Major-General Jeremy Michael Spencer-Smith, OBE, MC, late Foot Guards.
- Major-General Walter Babington Thomas, DSO, MC, ED, late Infantry.

Royal Air Force

- Air Vice-Marshal Frank Ronald Bird, DSO, DFC, AFC.
- Air Vice-Marshal Peter Charles Cleaver, OBE.
- Air Vice-Marshal Desmond Ernest Hawkins, CBE, DFC.
- Air Vice-Marshal Douglas Charles Lowe, DFC, AFC.
- Air Commodore Philippa Frances Marshall, OBE, ADC, Women's Royal Air Force.

Civil Division

- Paul Adams, TD, Chief Master, Taxing Office, Supreme Court of Judicature.
- Sidney Charles Bacon, Controller, Royal Ordnance Factories, Ministry of Defence.
- Ian Powell Bancroft, Deputy Secretary, Department of the Environment.
- Jack Eglington Beddoe, Under Secretary, Department of the Environment.
- Edward Percy Brown, Chief Inspector and Commissioner, Board of Customs and Excise.
- Richard Henry Watson Bullock, Deputy Secretary, Department of Trade and Industry.
- Neil Francis Cairncross, Deputy Secretary, Cabinet Office.
- William Robert Cox, Deputy Under-Secretary of State, Home Office.
- Andrew Francis Joseph Grant, lately Director of Home Regional Services, Department of the Environment.
- Edwin William George Haynes, Under Secretary, Department of Trade and Industry.
- Patrick Dalmahoy Nairne, MC, Deputy Under-Secretary of State, Ministry of Defence.
- William John Conway Plumbe, lately HM Chief Inspector of Factories, Department of Employment.
- Henry Peter Rowe, Parliamentary Counsel.
- David Somerville, Under Secretary, Department of Health and Social Security.
- Joanna Miriam Spencer, CBE, Under Secretary, Department of Trade and Industry.
- Douglas William Gretton Wass, Deputy Secretary, HM Treasury.

=== Order of Saint Michael and Saint George ===
==== Knight Grand Cross of the Order of St Michael and St George (GCMG) ====
- Sir Archibald Duncan Wilson, KCMG, HM Ambassador, Moscow.
- Sir Denis Arthur Hepworth Wright, KCMG, HM Ambassador, Tehran.

==== Knight Commander of the Order of St Michael and St George (KCMG) ====
- Geoffrey George Arthur, CMG, HM Political Resident, Bahrain.
- Reginald Michael Hadow, CMG, HM Ambassador, Buenos Aires.
- John Edward Killick, CMG, Foreign and Commonwealth Office.
- Crawford Murray MacLehose, CMG, MBE, Governor-designate, Hong Kong.
- John Howard Peck, CMG, HM Ambassador, Dublin.

==== Companion of the Order of St Michael and St George (CMG) ====
- Christopher Mervyn Dalley, Chairman, Iraq Petroleum Company Ltd.
- George Geoffrey David Hill, Assistant Secretary, Department of the Environment.
- Professor William Edgar Kershaw, VRD. For services to parasitology.
- Harry Norman Roffey, Assistant Secretary, Department of Health and Social Security.

Diplomatic Service and Overseas List

- David Pascoe Aiers, Foreign and Commonwealth Office.
- William Stanley Bates, British High Commissioner, Georgetown.
- Roy Grissell Bennett. For services to British interests in Singapore.
- Edwin Bolland, Counsellor, HM Embassy, Washington.
- Michael Denys Arthur Clinton, GM, Deputy Colonial Secretary, Hong Kong.
- Kenneth Arthur East, Minister, British High Commission, Lagos.
- Anthony Arthur Golds, MVO, HM Ambassador and Consul-General, Yaoundé.
- Keith Lyndell Gordon, lately Justice of Appeal, West Indies Associated States Supreme Court.
- David Gerard Gordon-Smith, Foreign and Commonwealth Office.
- Geoffrey Ernest Derek MacBride, MBE, Foreign and Commonwealth Office.
- Frank Mills, Foreign and Commonwealth Office.
- Terence John O'Brien, MC, HM Ambassador, Kathmandu.
- Reginald McCartney Samples, DSO, OBE, Head of British Government Office and Senior Trade Commissioner, Toronto.
- Anthony James Williams, HM Ambassador and Consul-General, Phnom Penh.

Australian States
State of New South Wales

- Edwin James Walder. For services to the State.

State of Victoria

- Councillor Edward Wallace Best. For services to local government and the community especially as Lord Mayor of the City of Melbourne.

State of Queensland

- Alderman William Robert Golding, MBE. of Gladstone. For outstanding public service.

State of South Australia

- Maxwell Lewis Dennis, of Glenelg East. For outstanding public service.

=== Royal Victorian Order ===
==== Dame Commander of the Royal Victorian Order (DCVO) ====
- The Honourable Olivia Vernon Mulholland, CVO.

==== Knight Commander of the Royal Victorian Order (KCVO) ====
- The Right Honourable Gilbert James, Earl of Ancaster, TD.
- Major-General the Honourable Michael Fitzalan-Howard, CB, CBE, MVO, MC.
- John Francis Hewitt, CBE.

==== Commander of the Royal Victorian Order (CVO) ====
- Reginald Wilfrid Barrow, MVO.
- Robert Edward Boote.
- Brigadier William Greenwood Carr, DSO.
- Lieutenant-Colonel Harold Andrew Balvaird Lawson, MVO.
- Commander Philip Brian Martineau, OBE, Royal Navy (Retired).
- Edward Max Nicholson, CB.
- Marshall Arnott Sisson, CBE.
- Cecil Dennis Waldron, OBE.

==== Member of the Royal Victorian Order (MVO) ====
At this time the two lowest classes of the Royal Victorian Order were "Member (fourth class)" and "Member (fifth class)", both with post-nominal letters MVO. "Member (fourth class)" was renamed "Lieutenant" (LVO) from the 1985 New Year Honours onwards.

Fourth Class

- James Bell.
- The Reverend Ronald Budge.
- Ethel Strachan Colquhoun, MVO, MBE.
- Commander John Phillip Edwards, Royal Navy.
- Squadron Leader Thomas Alvin Jackson, AFC, Royal Air Force.
- John William Lewis, MVO.
- Malcolm Henry McQueen.
- Adrian Vincent Pelly, MVO.
- Leslie Potts.
- Harold Vince Tillotson.

Fifth Class

- Walter Arthur Carpenter.
- George Crisp.
- Ann Mary Hughes.
- Joan Margaret Kirby.
- Diana Mary Robina Makgill.

==== Medal of the Royal Victorian Order (RVM) ====
In Silver

- Henry Charles Owen Clarke.
- Police Constable Edward William Fry, Metropolitan Police.
- George Gordon.
- William Holloway.
- Police Constable Evan John Jones, Metropolitan Police.
- Chief Petty Officer John Roland Mayes, P/JX 818355.
- Bernard Wallace McLaren.
- Arthur Stanley Shergold.
- Reginald Southgate.
- William Henry Spong.
- William George Tinson.

=== Order of the British Empire ===
==== Knight Grand Cross of the Order of the British Empire (GBE) ====
Military Division

- Lieutenant-General Sir Ian Henry Freeland, KCB, DSO, (53691), late Infantry, Deputy Colonel The Royal Anglian Regiment (Norfolk, Suffolk and Cambridgeshire).

Civil Division

- Sir Peter Malden Studd, Lord Mayor of London.

==== Dame Commander of the Order of the British Empire (DBE) ====
Civil Division

- Kathleen Mary Ollerenshaw. For services to Education.

Australian States
State of Victoria

- Mabel Irene, Lady Coles, CBE, of Mount Eliza. For charitable activities.

==== Knight Commander of the Order of the British Empire (KBE) ====
Military Division

- Surgeon Vice Admiral Eric Blackburn Bradbury, CB, QHP, Royal Navy.
- Acting Air Marshal John Samuel Rowlands, GC, OBE, Royal Air Force.

Civil Division

- Sir John Norris Nicholson, Bt., CIE, Chairman, Ocean Steam Ship Company Ltd.
- Ernest John Partridge, President, Confederation of British Industry.
- The Right Honourable Robert Hugh Turton, MC, DL, MP. For political and public services.

Diplomatic Service and Overseas List

- Rudolf Franz Josef Bing, CBE. For services to Anglo-American relations.
- Professor Douglas Vernon Hubble, CBE, MD, FRCP, lately Dean of Medical Faculty, Haile Selassie I University, Addis Ababa.

Australian States
State of Queensland

- The Honourable Gordon William Wesley Chalk, MLA, of Brisbane. For distinguished services to the State as a Minister of the Crown and Parliamentarian.

State of South Australia

- Ralph Meyrick Hague, of Gilberton, lately Crown Solicitor. For services to the legal profession.
- Raymond Stanmore Turner, of Toorak Gardens. For services to commerce and industry.

State of Tasmania

- Geoffrey Bayard Gibson Edgell. For services to agriculture and local government.

==== Commander of the Order of the British Empire (CBE) ====
Military Division

Royal Navy

- Commodore Peter John Bayne, DSC, ADC.
- Instructor Captain John Dennison Booth.
- Commodore Thomas Evelyn Fanshawe, DSC.
- Captain Michael Wallis Sylvester.

Army

- Brigadier James Roy Anderson, OBE, (153258), late Infantry Commander British Training Teams, Kenya.
- Brigadier Alan Edward Arnold, OBE, (99065), late Corps of Royal Engineers.
- Brigadier William Frank Cooper, OBE, MC, (125181), late Corps of Royal Engineers.
- Colonel Alexander Martin Ferrie (378046), late Royal Army Medical Corps.
- Brigadier Robert Cyril Ford, MBE, (284433), late Royal Armoured Corps.
- Colonel Donald Edwin Gibbs, TD, (354569), late Infantry, Territorial and Army Volunteer Reserve.
- Brigadier Rowland Spencer Noel Mans, OBE, (112882), late Infantry.
- Brigadier (acting) John Townsend Paley, MC, (338478), late Royal Armoured Corps.

Royal Air Force

- Air Commodore John Ivan Roy Bowring, OBE.
- Air Commodore John Nichol Stagey, DSO, DFC.
- Acting Air Commodore David Charles Saunders, OBE, AFC.
- Group Captain Charles Gaiger Broad, MBE.
- Group Captain Danbigh Leon Norris-Smith, OBE.
- Group Captain Samuel William Wilding.

Civil Division

- Sir Philip Magnus-Allcroft, Bt. (Philip Magnus), Biographer.
- Coningsby Allday, Managing Director (Commercial), British Nuclear Fuels Ltd., Risley, United Kingdom Atomic Energy Authority.
- William Allman, Chairman, Welsh Industrial Estates Corporation.
- George Arthur Baker. For services to Music.
- Hubert Barker, Director, Network Planning, Post Office Telecommunications.
- Harry Jefferson Barnes, Director, Glasgow School of Art.
- Jack Wheeler Barrett, Director, Research and Development, Monsanto Chemicals Ltd.
- William Thomas Bishop, Crown Estate Managing Agent and Receiver, Senior Partner, Drivers Jonas.
- William Blakey, lately Chairman, British Industrial Plastics Ltd.
- George Herbert Bryson, lately Chairman, Northern Ireland Housing Trust.
- Stevenson Buchan, Chief Scientific Officer, Institute of Geological Sciences.
- Doris Burchell. For services to Education.
- Edward John Burra, Painter.
- Ivan Oswald Chance, Chairman of Christie, Manson & Woods. For services to the fine art trade and to Export.
- Alan Christianson, MC, Deputy Chairman, South of Scotland Electricity Board.
- David Morris Clement, Board Member for Finance, National Coal Board.
- James Macdonald Cobban, TD, DL, lately Headmaster, Abingdon School, Berkshire.
- Humphrey Cauldwell Cotman, MC, Assistant Solicitor, Department of Trade and Industry.
- Alan Christopher Cowan, Assistant Secretary, Scottish Development Department.
- Captain William Herbert Cecil Daniel, TD. For political and public services in the South West.
- Major Peter Duke Doulton, lately Chairman, Matthew Hall & Co. Ltd. For services to Export.
- Arthur Richard Dufty, Secretary to the Royal Commission on Historical Monuments (England).
- Peter Francis Du Sautoy, OBE, Chairman and Managing Director, Faber & Faber Ltd. For services to Export.
- William Julius Eggeling, lately Director (Scotland), The Nature Conservancy.
- Allan David Flanders, lately Member, Commission on Industrial Relations.
- John Henry Francis, Assistant Secretary, Overseas Development Administration, Foreign and Commonwealth Office.
- Henry William French, Chief Inspector, Department of Education and Science.
- David Israel Goldstone, Chairman and Managing Director, The Sterling Rubber Co. Ltd. For services to Export.
- David John Goodlatte. For services to the Armed Forces cinemas.
- Bruce Wilfred Goodman, Board Member and Chairman of Coinage Committee, Decimal Currency Board.
- John Magnus Gray, MBE, ERD, Managing Director, William Ewart & Son Ltd., Belfast. For services to Export.
- Professor Humphrey Procter-Gregg. For services to Music.
- Roderic Alfred Gregory, George Holt Professor of Physiology, University of Liverpool.
- Kenneth Morgan Harris. For services to Rugby Football in Wales.
- James Haughton, QPM, Chief Constable, Liverpool and Bootle Constabulary.
- Thomas Geoffrey Hazlewood, Director of Contracts, Ministry of Defence.
- Rose Louise, Lady Henriques. For services to the community in East London.
- Harold George Hillier, Senior Partner, Hillier & Sons, Winchester. For services to horticulture.
- Harold Hobson, Dramatic Critic, The Sunday Times.
- Kenneth Lawrence Holland, MBE, Chief Fire Officer, West Riding of Yorkshire Fire Brigade.
- Professor William George Hoskins, FBA. For services to local history.
- Henry Taylor Howat, Physician, United Manchester Hospitals. For services to the organisation of health care.
- Marjorie Glen Hull, MBE. For political and public services in London.
- Christopher James Jackson, OBE, Executive, The Distillers Company Ltd. For services to Research.
- Colonel Richard John Laurence Jackson, OBE, Chairman, North York Moors National Park Planning Committee.
- Robert Leoline James, Head Master of Harrow School.
- John George Jenkins, Farmer, Cambridge and Lincolnshire. For services to agriculture.
- Leslie Augustus Westover Jenkins, A Deputy Chairman, British National Export Council. For services to Export.
- Trevor Jenkins, Lately Director of Education, Glamorgan.
- Cecil Artimus Evan-Jones, MBE, Secretary, Institute of Chartered Accountants, England and Wales.
- Sydney Jones, Board Member, British Railways Board. For services to railway research
- Captain Henry Francis Jowett, Chief Marine Superintendent and Director, Furness Withy & Co. Ltd.
- Geoffrey Thomas Kidner, Chairman, British Egg Marketing Board.
- Arthur George Asquith-Leeson, TD, Alderman, Portsmouth City Council.
- Gilbert Little, Engineer and Manager, Lower Clyde Water Board.
- Alexander McEwan, Chairman and Managing Director, Miehle Goss Dexter Ltd., Preston. For services to Export.
- Patrick Gerard McGrath, Senior Consultant Psychiatrist, Broadmoor Hospital.
- Ernest Edward Marshall, Technical Director, Weybridge Division, British Aircraft Corporation Ltd. For services to Export.
- Richard Bonnar Matthews, QPM, Chief Constable, Warwickshire and Coventry Constabulary.
- William Malcolm Millar, Professor of Mental Health, University of Aberdeen.
- Leslie Lonsdale Milner, Senior Principal Inspector, Board of Inland Revenue.
- Bernard Loweth Morgan, MBE. For political and public services in the Eastern Area.
- William Woolf Mushin, Professor of Anaesthetics, Welsh National School of Medicine.
- Lionel Benedict Nicholson, MVO, Editor, The Burlington Magazine.
- The Most Noble Lavinia Mary, Duchess of Norfolk. For services to the community in Sussex.
- Frank Arthur Robert Owens, Editor, Birmingham Evening Mail.
- Herbert William Palmer, Deputy Chairman, Glaxo Group Ltd.
- Eric Reginald Parrinder, Partner, Davis, Belfield & Everest, Chartered Quantity Surveyors.
- Edwin George Peirson, Principal, Worcester College of Education.
- Professor William Brian Reddaway, Lately Member, National Board for Prices and Incomes.
- Edgar Lynton Richards, MBE, MC, TD, Member, Monopolies Commission.
- Robert David Valpo Roberts, Member for Industrial Relations, Electricity Council.
- Thomas Duncan Murison Robertson, Deputy Chairman, Scottish Aviation Ltd. For services to Export.
- Professor George John Romanes, Chairman, Board of Management, Edinburgh Royal Infirmary and Associated Hospitals.
- Marcus Maurice Scott, lately Surgeon-in-Chief, St. John Ambulance Brigade.
- Lieutenant-Colonel Robert Willoughby Hamilton Scott, OBE, DL, Chairman, Territorial Auxiliary and Volunteer Reserve Association, Northern Ireland.
- Bernard Charles Sharp, Chairman, British Bankers' Association Decimalisation Working Party.
- John Ross Stainton, Managing Director, British Overseas Airways Corporation.
- James Robertson Stewart, OBE, Clerk of the University Court, University of London.
- Arthur Leslie Stuchbery, OBE, Chairman, Remploy Ltd.
- James Chesebrough Swaffield, RD, Secretary, Association of Municipal Corporations.
- Henry Thornhill Swain, County Architect, Nottinghamshire.
- Robert Ronald Taylor, Chairman, Glenrothes Development Corporation.
- Professor Brinley Thomas, OBE, Lately Chairman, Welsh Council.
- Lawrence Victor Dolman Tindale, Director and General Manager, Industrial and Commercial Finance Corporation Ltd.
- Eric William Towler, Chairman, Board of Governors, United Oxford Hospitals.
- John Trevelyan, OBE, Secretary, The British Board of Film Censors.
- Geoffrey Swinfen Tucker. For political services.
- Norman Charles Turner, Member, National Insurance Advisory Committee.
- Alwyn Brunow Waters, MBE, GM, Chairman, Joint Contracts Tribunal.
- Anne Margaret Wilson White, Chief Nursing Officer, United Liverpool Hospitals.
- William Lester White, Headmaster, Connaught Junior Boys' School, Bristol.
- Stephen Robert Ferguson Whittaker, DL, Consultant Physician, Warwick Hospital.
- Robert Walter Whittington. For services to the building industry.
- David Valentine Willcocks, MC, Director of Music, King's College, University of Cambridge.
- Mervyn Ralph Penry Williams, Principal Medical Officer, HM Prison Wakefield.
- David Alastair Hamilton Wills, MBE, TD, DL. For services to the Ditchley Foundation.
- Brian Harvey Wilson, MBE, Town Clerk, London Borough of Camden.
- Laurence Sydney Yoxall, Chairman, Foxboro-Yoxall Company. For services to Export.

Diplomatic Service and Overseas List

- The Right Reverend Oliver Claude Allison, Anglican Bishop in the Sudan.
- The Honourable Clarence Alfred Bain, lately Minister without Portfolio, Bahama Islands.
- Ian John Bowler, OBE. For services to British commercial interests in Iran.
- Alberto Casali, Honorary British Consul, Trieste.
- Gervase de la Poer Cassels, OBE, lately Director of United Nations Works and Relief Agency, Jerusalem.
- Thomas Edwin Clunie, QPM, Commissioner, Royal Bahamas Police Force.
- Wilson James Craig, Controller, Overseas Division, British Council.
- Douglas Foakes Fairbairn, lately Commonwealth Development Corporation Representative in West Africa.
- Alexander Alfred William Landymore, lately United Kingdom Permanent Delegate to the Food and Agriculture Organization, Rome.
- James Simson Nisbet, OBE, TD. For services to British interests in Brazil.
- Harold Sydney Peters, MBE, lately Permanent Secretary (Administration), Office of the President and Cabinet, Malawi.
- Edgar Seeley Readwin. For services to British interests in Guyana.
- Kenneth Ernest Robinson, Vice-Chancellor, University of Hong Kong.
- Peter Trevor Simpson-Jones. For services to British commercial interests in France.
- Alan John Wood. For services to British commercial interests in Malaysia.
- Arnold William Redrup Wood. For services to British interests in Ghana.

Australian States
State of New South Wales

- John Milton Oliver McDonell. For services to the State.
- Myra Jean Nixon. For services to the community.

State of Victoria

- Frank Lionel Fitzpatrick, MM, of Mitcham. For services to the community and to industry.
- Professor Edwin Sherbon Hills, of Kew. For distinguished services to geology.

State of Queensland

- Arthur Fleetwood Luya, of Brisbane. For services to the community.
- Charles Robert Morton, MB, of Toowoomba. For services to medicine and ex-servicemen.

State of South Australia

- Ralph Meyrick Hague, of Gilberton. For services to the legal profession.
- Raymond Stanmore Turner, of Toorak Gardens. For Services to commerce and industry.

State of Tasmania

- Geoffrey Bayard Gibson Edgell. For services to agriculture and local government.

==== Officer of the Order of the British Empire (OBE) ====
Military Division

Royal Navy

- Lieutenant Colonel David Lindsay Bailey, Royal Marines.
- Surgeon Commander John William Bough, MB, BCh.
- Commander Anthony John Boyall, DSC.
- Acting Captain Charles Edward Newenham Deane.
- Commander Alec Peter Fassnidge.
- Commander David Riley Johnston, DSC.
- The Reverend Patrick Johnston Moffett, Chaplain C.S.F.C.
- Acting Captain John Anthonv Rowland Swainson.
- Commander Antony George Temple-Carrington.
- Commander Derek Axel Adlam Willis.

Army

- Lieutenant-Colonel (now acting Colonel) Alexander Crawford Simpson Boswell, MBE, (397816), The Argyll and Sutherland Highlanders (Princess Louise's).
- Lieutenant-Colonel Arthur Charles Burgher (291903), Corps of Royal Military Police.
- Lieutenant-Colonel Robert Michael Westly Busk (376003), Corps of Royal Engineers.
- Lieutenant Colonel John Bernard Chanter, MBE, (118407), Royal Regiment of Artillery now R.A.R.O.
- Lieutenant-Colonel John Sydney Cooper (379989), Royal Regiment of Artillery.
- Lieutenant-Colonel Douglas Crookes (431739), Royal Corps of Signals.
- Lieutenant-Colonel (now acting Colonel) Brian Michael John Aldous Dalton (365755), Royal Army Ordnance Corps.
- Lieutenant-Colonel Graham Lloyd Davies (390870), Royal Corps of Signals.
- Lieutenant-Colonel William Charles Deller (370067), The Royal Anglian Regiment.
- Lieutenant-Colonel John Frederick Dixon-Nuttall, MBE, (380648), Royal Regiment of Artillery.
- Lieutenant-Colonel Ernest Lome Campbell Edlmann, MC, (63568), late The Buffs (Royal East Kent).
- Lieutenant-Colonel Richard Eustace John Gerrard-Wright, MBE, (407841), The Royal Anglian Regiment.
- Lieutenant-Colonel Thomas Mure Goodall (423430), Royal Army Medical Corps.
- Lieutenant-Colonel George Sydney Goulding (261476), Intelligence Corps.
- Lieutenant-Colonel (acting) Edgar Percy Jennings, MBE, (361649), Combined Cadet Force.
- Lieutenant-Colonel Vernon Newton (303342), Royal Regiment of Artillery.
- Lieutenant-Colonel John Charles Donald Nuttman (352813), Corps of Royal Electrical and Mechanical Engineers.
- Lieutenant-Colonel John Aubrey Stephenson (400075), Royal Regiment of Artillery.
- Lieutenant-Colonel Edwin Turnill (397389), The Royal Anglian Regiment.
- Lieutenant-Colonel Colin Sainthill Wallis-King (339541), Coldstream Guards.

Royal Air Force

- Wing Commander Donald Biltcliffe (570611).
- Wing Commander Brian Ralph Anthony Cox, AFC, (58305).
- Wing Commander Peter Gilliatt (607085).
- Wing Commander John Ross Lambert, MBE, (2388886).
- Wing Commander Thomas Brown McCaskie (187533).
- Wing Commander David Ferric Moffat (2600539).
- Wing Commander Peter Lumsden Tudor Owen (609006).
- Wing Commander William Ernest Satterthwaite (54324).
- Wing Commander Peter Frank Steib, DFC, (112549).
- Wing Commander James Mackereth Stevenson (204213).
- Wing Commander David Leslie Fallon Thornton (2316920).
- Acting Wing Commander Bertram James Pitt Simpkins, DFC, (152496), Royal Air Force Volunteer Reserve (Training Branch).

Civil Division

- Frank Lewis Akast, lately Senior Mechanical Engineering Officer, Ministry of Defence.
- Norman Stanley Gordon Allen, Chairman, Ipswich Group Hospital Management Committee.
- Elizabeth Appleby. For political services in the North East.
- Fred Roper Appleby, Vice-Chairman, Rural District Councils' Association.
- William Denys Armstrong, lately Domestic Bursar, Churchill College, University of Cambridge.
- Isobel Mary Asbury, Principal, Monopolies Commission.
- Thomas Atkin. For services to the road haulage industry in Scotland.
- Ronald Ernest Dudley Bain, Chief Engineer, Belfast City and District Water Commissioners.
- John Howard Baker, Manager, Supply and Transport Division, Shell-Mex and BP Ltd.
- Desmond William Bartlett, formerly Manager, Machinery Installation Department, Cammell Laird & Co. (Shipbuilding & Engineering) Ltd., Birkenhead.
- Henry Bate. For services to Journalism.
- John Clifford Bayliss, Principal Information Officer, Central Office of Information.
- Werner Meyer Behr. For charitable and other services to the British Academy.
- Edward Ian Bell, First Class Valuer, Board of Inland Revenue.
- Esmond Clive Bemrose, DL. For services to the Scout Association in Derbyshire.
- Doris Evelyn Betts, Foreign and Commonwealth Office.
- Ian Alfred Beveridge, lately Director, Scotland, Commonwealth Institute.
- Charles William Boreham, Secretary General, The British Section, Council of European Municipalities.
- Francis William Bosson. For services to the Scout Association in Staffordshire.
- James Colman Bowe, Medical Director, Lingfield Hospital School, Surrey.
- Captain James Charles Duncan Bowick, Captain, Royal Maritime Auxiliary Service, St. Margarets, Admiralty Cable Ship Service, Ministry of Defence.
- Thomas William Bowman, Chairman, Visiting Committee, HM Prison Canterbury.
- Wilfred Macaulay Brennen. For services to the welfare of youth in Northern Ireland.
- Captain James Brittain, Commodore, Shell Tankers (United Kingdom) Ltd.
- Margaret Browne, MBE, Senior Lecturer in Psychiatric Social Work, University of Edinburgh.
- Henry James Bullock, Director, British Moulding Machine Co. Ltd. For services to Export.
- George Southwell Burden, Director, Epilepsy Information Unit, British Epilepsy Association.
- John Burdock, Chairman Highways Committee, Halifax County Borough Council.
- Raymond Edward Burnett, Managing Director, Marconi Instruments Ltd. For services to Export.
- Thomas Samuel Charles Busby. For services to the Royal British Legion.
- John Charles Michael Butler, MBE, Director, Multiple Shops Federation.
- Professor John Caldwell, Chairman, South West Region Careers Advisory Council.
- Richard Kenneth Carrick. For political services.
- Ivan Philip Marten Chambers, lately Managing Director, W. J. Bryce Ltd.
- Jack Stanley Richard Chard, Conservator, North West England, Forestry Commission.
- Satya Saran Chatterjee, Deputy Chairman, North West Conciliation Committee, Race Relations Board.
- Walter Robert Chipperfield, Executive Engineer (Scottish Works), Babcock & Wilcox. For services to Export.
- Harold Frederick Chisnall, QFSM, Deputy Chief Officer, London Fire Brigade.
- Lieutenant-Colonel Geoffrey Gerald Seymour Clarke, DSO, General Secretary, The Soldiers' and Airmens' Scripture Readers Association.
- Robert Waring Pitcairn Cockburn, Controller, Administration, External Broadcasting, British Broadcasting Corporation.
- George Keith Thurburn Conn, Professor of Physics, University of Exeter.
- William Ross Cotton, Assistant Director General, Greater London Council.
- Ernest Harrison Coulson, Organiser for advanced level Chemistry, Nuffield Science Teaching Project.
- Joseph Crawford, General Secretary, National Association of Colliery Overmen, Deputies and Shotfirers.
- George Croft, Principal, Granville College of Further Education, Sheffield.
- John Michael Croft, Director, The National Youth Theatre.
- Samuel James Curry. For services to agriculture in Northern Ireland.
- Antony Dale, Chief Investigator of Historic Buildings, Department of the Environment.
- Major Alexander Stirling Oliphant Dandie, Chairman, The Earl Haig Fund (Scotland).
- John Edward Dangerfield, Superintending Officer, construction of Hyde Park Barracks.
- James Romanes Davidson, General Director, Quarrier's Homes, Bridge of Weir.
- Robert Kelso Dickie, Petroleum Production Inspector Senior Grade, Department of Trade and Industry.
- Lancelot Smith Dodd, lately Resident Engineer in Chief, M6 Motorway, Scott Wilson, Kirkpatrick & Partners.
- Oscar Roy Dorken, Chairman and Joint Managing Director, Alfred Field & Co. Ltd. For services to Export.
- Alan James Dowling, DFC, Assistant Secretary, Royal Mint.
- Morrell Henry Draper, Deputy Director, Poultry Research Centre, Edinburgh.
- John Dronfield. For services to the community in York.
- Thomas Roy Earnshaw, Director and General Manager, Sealing Materials Division, Turner Brothers Asbestos Co. Ltd., Rochdale. For services to Export.
- Percy Ebbage, Principal, Ministry of Agriculture, Fisheries and Food.
- Norman Edmond, Director and General Manager, North of Scotland, Orkney & Shetland Shipping Co. Ltd.
- Geoffrey William Elbourne, Director (European Sales Organisation), International Computers Ltd. For services to Export.
- Wilfred Edwin Elkes, Chairman, Uttoxeter Savings Committee.
- Joseph Eric Ellison, Administrative Director, Navy, Army and Air Force Institutes.
- Sidney Elmitt, County Treasurer, Flintshire.
- Alfred Edward John Emmet, Founder and Director, The Questors Theatre, Ealing.
- Kenneth Exell, Principal Architect, South West Region, Department of the Environment.
- The Reverend Ronald Hugh Wilson Falconer, Head of Religious Broadcasting, Scotland, British Broadcasting Corporation.
- James Ross Finnie, lately Town Chamberlain, Greenock.
- Hugh Fish, Chief Purification Officer, Thames Conservancy.
- John Fleming, Director of Housing, City and County of Bristol.
- Lieutenant-Colonel Christopher Francis Fothergill, DL. For political and public services in Wales.
- Lloyd Howard Fox. For services to the community in Somerset.
- Sidney Arthur Free, Director, Rowntree Mackintosh Ltd., York For services to Export.
- Inger Kristine Frith. For services to Archery.
- Vera Isabella Furness, General Manager, Research Division, Courtaulds Ltd. For services to Export.
- Frank Garwood, Senior Principal Scientific Officer, Department of the Environment.
- William Anthony George, Chairman, Corby Local Employment Committee.
- Alison Archibald Gibson, Honorary Secretary, Soldiers', Sailors', and Airmen's Families Association, Clackmannan and Kinross-shire.
- Sidney Christopher Ginn, Managing Director, National Industrial Fuel Efficiency Service.
- Howard Glaister, Member, Northern Economic Planning Council.
- George Stanley Green, Clerk to Justices, Manchester County Petty Sessional Division and Borough of Eccles.
- Frederick John Hall, Assistant Director, Tropical Products Institute, Overseas Development Administration, Foreign and Commonwealth Office.
- George William Hamilton, Chief Accountant, Department of Trade and Industry.
- Alan Hardaker, Secretary, The Football League.
- Theophilus George Harrison, Chairman, Swinton and Pendlebury Local Employment Committee.
- Major John Anthony Eric Hathrell, Director, Thomas Storey (Engineers) Ltd. For services to Export.
- Doris Muriel Hawkins, Matron, British Hospital for Mothers and Babies, Woolwich.
- Lucretia Pauline Rebecca Anne Cameron-Head, Member, Inverness County Council.
- Mildred Eileen Head. For social and local government services in Sudbury, Suffolk.
- Madeleine Elgiva Heald, Headmistress, Loughton County High School for Girls, Essex.
- John Stockdale Heap, Assistant Director, Social Services Department, Croydon.
- Kenneth James Henry, Senior Staff, Fast Reactor Directorate, Reactor Group, Risley, United Kingdom Atomic Energy Authority.
- Cyril Hewertson, Principal, Ministry of Defence.
- Wendy Hiller (Wendy Margaret Gow), Actress.
- Leonard Hinds, Headmaster, Stafford County Junior School, Eastbourne.
- Colonel Geoffrey George Hodges, TD, DL, Chairman and Managing Director, George Hodges & Son Ltd., Burton-on-Trent.
- Benjamin Holden, ERD, TD, General Medical Practitioner, Macclesfield.
- John Henry Ellicott Howorth, Chairman, Fire Offices' Committee.
- Robert Evered Huband, Clerk and Solicitor of Worsley Urban District Council.
- Harold William Hudson, Deputy Assistant Commissioner, Metropolitan Police.
- Ronald Harry Picton Hyde, News Editor, Evening Standard.
- Maurice Jacobson. For services to Music.
- Clyde Robert John, Co-Chairman, Slough International Friendship Council.
- Richard Jones, Headmaster, Amlwch Primary School, Anglesey.
- Thomas Murray Kemsley. For political services in Scotland.
- Joseph King, General Secretary, National Union of Textile and Allied Workers.
- Laurence Edward King, Architect. For services to the restoration of Churches.
- Philip Douglas Knights, QPM, Deputy Chief Constable, Birmingham City Police.
- Charles Leslie Langshaw, Senior Public Health Engineer, Metropolitan Police Office.
- Terence Bryant Lawson, Secretary, Council for Education in World Citizenship, United Nations Association.
- George Alastair Lean, Trustee and Past Chairman, Savings Bank of Glasgow.
- Alexander Francis Leest. For political services in the South West.
- Charles Legh Shuldham Cornwall-Legh, DL. For services to the community in Cheshire.
- Thomas Jonathan Lewis, Clerk and Solicitor of Runcorn Urban District Council.
- Harry Pickering Lockwood, Headmaster, Edward Sheerien County Secondary Modern School, Barnsley.
- Islwyn Lockyer, Principal, Rockingham Area Institute of Further Education, West Riding of Yorkshire.
- James McCausland, Director, Technical Services Division, HM Stationery Office.
- Donald Mack. For services to Covent Garden Market.
- Margaret Brown Mackay, Chairman, Wolverhampton Probation and After-Care Committee.
- Patrick Joseph McKenna, Principal Officer and Accountant, Ministry of Finance for Northern Ireland.
- Elizabeth Kilpatrick McNaught, Nursing Officer, Scottish Home and Health Department.
- John McRobert. For political services in County Down.
- Roy James Macwalter, lately Chairman, Milk and Milk Products Technical Advisory Committee.
- Kenneth Laurence Martin, Painter and Sculptor.
- John Leslie Matthews, MBE, General Manager, Newcastle upon Tyne Trustee Savings Bank.
- Albert Ingram May, Chairman, Yorkshire (East Riding) County Agricultural Executive Committee.
- Thomas Atkinson Mead, Group Manager, Commercial, Teesside and Workington Group A, British Steel Corporation.
- William Mclntosh Millar, Chairman, Strathclyde Housing Society Ltd.
- James Fraser Milne, MC, Secretary and Director of Education, Institute of Health Service Administrators.
- Helen Mitchell, Regional Nursing Officer, North-Eastern Regional Hospital Board (Scotland).
- Daphne Winifred Monard. For political and public services in Wessex.
- Doris Langley Moore, Founder and Adviser, Museum of Costume, Bath.
- William Moore, lately Assistant County Education Officer for Primary Education and Welfare, Kent.
- Graham Claude Murphy, TD. For public and charitable services.
- Dennis Arthur Neale, MC, Executive Director, Institute of Building.
- Donald Edward Neale, Principal, Edinburgh Foot Clinic and School of Chiropody.
- Walter Nethercot, Chairman, Ministry of Posts and Telecommunications Advisory Technical Sub-Committee on Wireless Interference from Industrial Apparatus.
- William Herbert Newman, Member, Council for Small Industries in Rural Areas.
- Eric William Nicholas, Chief Quantity Surveyor, British Airports Authority.
- William Reid Nicolson, Headmaster, Fairmuir Special School, Dundee.
- John Wilfred Nosworthy, Member, Devizes Rural District Council.
- Albert Edward Nurse, lately Secretary, Wakefield Diocesan Board of Finance.
- Lieutenant-Colonel Frederick Russell Oliver, Deputy County Engineer and Surveyor, West Riding of Yorkshire.
- Kathleen Amy O'Neill, Principal, Home Office.
- Arthur Llewellyn Owen, Secretary, Northern Stock Exchange.
- John Ernest Parbury. For services to the Magistracy in Coventry.
- William Frederick Pettit. For services to the community in Reading, Berkshire.
- William Canton Philpin, Chairman, Education Committee, Pembrokeshire County Council.
- David Stanley Pierson, lately Chairman, East Suffolk Anglo-American Community Relations Committee.
- Mary Banks Pinkerton. For political and public services in Lanarkshire.
- Captain Edward Fowle Pizey, DSO, Royal Navy (Retd.), General Manager, The Royal Naval Film Corporation, Ministry of Defence.
- Dennis George Plaister, MBE, Senior Principal, Office of the Parliamentary Commissioner for Administration.
- Samuel Walter Potts, Area Director, South Durham, National Coal Board.
- Claire Adela Pratt, lately Chief Education Officer, London Borough of Hillingdon.
- John Cuthbert Widdrington Riddell, Chairman, Northumberland Agricultural Executive Committee.
- Michael Redmond Ryan, Master, Overseas Containers Ltd.
- Frederick Norman Salmon, Borough Alderman, Newcastle under Lyme. County Alderman, Staffordshire County Council.
- Lionel Alexander Sanson, Sales and Service Director, Guided Weapons Division, British Aircraft Corporation Ltd. For services to Export.
- Brigadier Raymond Somerville Scott, CIE, Chairman, The British Bloodstock Agency Ltd. For services to Export.
- Phyllis Sellick (Phyllis Doreen Smith), Pianist.
- John Barry Selway, DFC, Aerodrome Commandant I, Department of Trade and Industry.
- Robert Shields, Technical Adviser, Ministry of Defence.
- William Shires, Manager, Travelling Post Office Section, Mails and Transport Division, Post Office.
- Albert John William Shirley, Technical Director, M.L. Aviation Co. Ltd., White Waltham, Berkshire. For services to Export.
- Percy George Shute, MBE, Assistant Director, Malaria Reference Laboratory, Epsom.
- Monica Louie Sims, Head of Children's Programmes, Television, British Broadcasting Corporation.
- Arthur William Smith, Consultant, Rank Precision Industries Ltd.
- Cyril James Smith, Pianist.
- John Batson Smith, Principal Architect, Department of Education and Science.
- John Wardley Smith, Senior Principal Scientific Officer, Warren Spring Laboratory, Department of Trade and Industry.
- Leonard William Smith, Deputy Chairman, North Thames Gas Board.
- Noel Rendell Smith, Director, South Nottinghamshire Area, National Coal Board.
- James Robert Spencer, lately Joint Managing Director and Associate Editor, Liverpool Daily Post and Echo.
- John Charles William Springbett, General Manager, Pension Development and Insurance, British European Airways.
- Robert Alexander Stables, Manager and Secretary, Aberdeen & Northern Marts Ltd.
- Charles Crichton Birnie Stevens, Member, Manchester Regional Hospital Board.
- Mary MacAskill Stewart, MBE, Honorary Secretary and Treasurer, North-East Area Group (Metropolitan Essex), Forces Help Society and Lord Roberts Workshops.
- William Edward Cook Stuart, Chairman, Stuart & Sons Ltd. For services to Export.
- Joan Anne Surr, Chief Nursing Officer, London Borough of Hammersmith.
- George Swift, TD, General Medical Practitioner, Winchester.
- Paul Lea Taylor, Principal, John Taylor & Co. (Bellfounders), Loughborough. For services to Export.
- Graham Thomas, HM Inspector, Department of Education and Science.
- Gwilym Owen Thomas, Consultant Chest Physician, Mid-Wales Hospital Group.
- Peter Dewar Thomson, TD, General Medical Practitioner, Dingwall, Ross-shire.
- Eric Townsend, MC, General Medical Practitioner, Camborne.
- Emily Elizabeth Wade, Director of Training, British Red Cross Society.
- John Gnmshaw Wainwright, Chairman, South East Lancashire Valuation Panel.
- Leonard David Walker, Under Secretary, Church Commissioners.
- Ronald Arthur Edward Walker, Secretary, National Research Development Corporation.
- William Walkinshaw, Head of Computer and Automation Division, Rutherford High Energy Laboratory, Didcot, Science Research Council.
- Helena Mary Walsh, Principal, Foreign Compensation Commission.
- Robert Walton, QPM, Chief Constable, Kingston upon Hull City Police.
- Rowland Walley Ward, Chairman, Advisory Committee, Gleadthorpe Experimental Husbandry Farm.
- John Fairbairn Warin, Medical Officer of Health, Oxford City.
- Elizabeth Washington, Chief Adviser on Catering and Dietetics, Department of Health and Social Security.
- Dorothy Mary Watkins, Assistant Director of Social Services, Cornwall County Council.
- Ursula Brandram Webb, Social Worker, St. Christopher's Hospice, Sydenham.
- Captain Geoffrey Huyshe Stafford Webber, Secretary General, British Show Jumping Association.
- James Albert Lovatt Wenger. For political and public services in the West Midlands.
- John Whewell, General Medical Practitioner, Middlesbrough.
- Norman Albert Whitaker, Managing Director, Tilley Lamp Co. Ltd., Dunmurry. For services to Export.
- Peter Augustus Willes, Head of Drama, Yorkshire Television.
- Hugh Williams, Headmaster, Wellacre County Secondary School for Boys, Manchester.
- William George Williams, lately Senior Principal Scientific Officer, Ministry of Aviation Supply.
- David Williamson, QPM, Chief Constable, Renfrew and Bute Constabulary.
- William Wright, MBE, Chairman, County Down Savings Committee.

Diplomatic Service and Overseas List

- William Stanton Ashford, Regional Information Officer, British Government Office, Montreal.
- Jack Maurice Bailey. For services to British interests in South Vietnam.
- The Reverend George Stanley Baker, lately Dean of Antigua.
- David Bateson Barker, lately Chief Inspector of Schools, Zambia.
- Alick Stuart Beck. For services to British commercial interests in Brazil.
- William Spiers Black. For services to the British community in Karachi.
- Denzil John Atyeo Briggs, Deputy Senior Permanent Secretary, Lesotho.
- Richard Brisbourne. For services to the British community in Nigeria.
- Louis Francis Bruzon. For services to journalism in Gibraltar.
- Malcolm Edward Richardson Bulloch, lately Assistant Secretary (Planning & Development), Health Department, Ministry of Labour and Social Services, Zambia.
- Roger Burrow-Wilkes, Comptroller of Customs and Excise, British Solomon Islands Protectorate.
- John Astell Burt, MBE, TD. For services to the British community in Karachi.
- David Keith Burton, Permanent Secretary, Ministry of Communications and Works, Dominica.
- Geraldine Mary Caballero, Honorary British Consul, Cochabamba, Bolivia.
- Isabella Donald Smith Camp, MBE. For social welfare services in Saint Helena.
- Oscar Lawrence Chamberland. For public services in Gibraltar.
- Lieutenant-Colonel John Drummond-Hay Chapman, MBE. For services to education in Pakistan.
- Michael Clapham. For services to British interests in Iran.
- Olive Constance Coulson, Student Officer, Nigerian High Commission, London.
- Father Fergus Timothy Cronin, S.J. For services to education in Hong Kong.
- Gilbert d'Arnaud-Taylor, Deputy British High Commissioner, Benin, Nigeria.
- Hugh Doggett, lately Senior Principal Scientific Officer, East African Agriculture & Forestry Research Organisation.
- Gavin William Stovin Dudley, Electoral Officer and Chairman of the Management Committee, Bathurst City Council, The Gambia.
- Eric Thomas Henry Fitzsimmons, MBE, lately British Council Representative, Jordan.
- Ormond Cyril Forde. For services to banking and the community in St. Vincent.
- Alexander Ford-Robertson. For services to British commercial interests in Argentina.
- Professor John William Fox-Taylor, Head of Department of Dental Surgery, University of Lagos, Nigeria.
- Marco Enrico Clifton Giglioli, Director, Mosquito Research and Control Unit, Cayman Islands.
- Eleanor Harse (Mother Mary). For services to the British community in Tokyo.
- Christopher de Lancy Herdon, lately First Secretary, HM Embassy, Aden.
- Philip James Horniblow, MB, BS, lately Director of Health, Abu Dhabi.
- Kenneth Howes. For services to British interests in Nairobi.
- Thomas Hugh Hughes-Davies, BM, BCh, lately Head of British Medical Team, The Children's Hospital, Saigon.
- Samuel Hunter, lately Commonwealth Development Corporation Officer, Sabah.
- The Reverend the Honourable Clifford Stanley Jones, BEM, Speaker, State Council, Turks and Caicos Islands.
- Lionel Victor Laxton. For services to British commercial interests in Guatemala.
- George Clegg Littler, TD, HM Consul, Bergen.
- Lo Kwee-seong. For services to industry and the community in Hong Kong.
- Henry Luxton, DFC. For services to the British community in Lima.
- Thomas McCready. For services to the British community in Lahore.
- Robert William MacDonald, lately Chief Accountant, East African Railways Corporation.
- Ignatius Baptiste McEwen. For public services in Grenada.
- Gordon Alexander William Marshall. For services to the British community in Liberia.
- James Nathaniel Meighan, MBE. For public services in British Honduras.
- James Milne, MBE. For services to British commercial interests in Iran.
- James Rutherford Minto, lately Principal, Dr. Graham's Homes, Kalimpong, West Bengal.
- Alastair Murdoch. For services to British commercial interests in Italy.
- Eric Christopher O'Brien. For services to the British community in Liberia.
- Dick Hurst Pantlin. For services to the British community in Brussels.
- Alford Everett Penn, BEM, Chief Secretary, British Virgin Islands.
- Gerald Albert Prowse, lately Director, Tropical Fish Culture Research Institute, Malacca.
- The Venerable Derek Alec Rawcliffe, Archdeacon of Southern Melanesia.
- Edward Charles Alfred Roberts. For services to British interests in Barbados.
- Michael Graham Satow. For services to British interests in India.
- Robert James Smart, Chief Inspector of Education, North-Eastern State of Nigeria.
- Catherine Joyce Symons. For services to education in Hong Kong.
- Cyril Frederick Thomas Tame. For services to British commercial interests in Jamaica.
- John Francis Taylor, lately First Secretary and HM Consul, Paris.
- Peter Joseph Taylor. For services to British commercial interests in Kuwait.
- Tom Groome Temperley. For services to British interests in Kuwait.
- Leslie Edgar Thirkettle. For services to exports and to the British community in the United Arab Republic.
- Geoffrey Lowe Timms, FRCPath., Specialist Pathologist, Kenyatta National Hospital, Kenya.
- Percy Reginald Tucker, JP. For services to sport and to the community in Bermuda.
- Cyril Underwood, British Technical Assistance Officer, Thailand.
- John Annibale Walters. For services to British interests in Milan.
- Henry Michael Weatherall, British Technical Assistance Officer, Nepal.
- John Kingdon Guy Webb, BM, BCh, Director, Christian Medical College & Hospital, Vellore, India.
- John Saul Wetton. For services to British interests in Colombia.
- Edward Travers Wilmot, Under Secretary, Ministry of Agriculture and Natural Resources, Malawi.
- Frederick Witty, MBE. For services to the British community in Barcelona.
- Bernard Meredith Woods, lately Principal, Bunda College of Agriculture, Malawi.
- Michael Harold Wrigley, lately First Secretary, HM Embassy, Bangkok.

Australian States
State of New South Wales

- Basil Arthur Helmore, of Newcastle. For services to the community.
- Elvira Listwan. For services to the community.
- Thomas Ross McKenzie. For services to education.
- Jack Kingston Pearce. For services to broadcasting.
- Colonel Edwin Thomas Penfold, ED. For services to the community.
- Rupert Boswood Scammell. For services to the community.
- Walter John Wearn. For services to the community.

State of Victoria

- Councillor Vautin Hilary Andrews, of Newtown, Geelong. For services to local government and to the community.
- Hartley Gibson, of Brighton. For services to the community.
- Allen Rupert Guy, of Bendigo. For services to the community and to industry.
- Lorna Hannan, of Elsternwick. For charitable activities.
- Father Patrick Joseph Stephenson, of Kew. For services to education.
- Leonard Roberts Stillman, MC, ED, of East Hawthorn. For outstanding work as Director and President of the Royal Humane Society.
- Councillor Herbert David Thomas, of Edithvale. For services to local government.

State of Queensland

- Edward William Cleary, of Toowoomba. For services to the community and to sport.
- Errol Blair de Normanville Joyce, of Eidsvold. For services to the grazing industry and to the community.
- Alma Jean McCormack, of Surat. For public services.
- George Houlton Mocatta, of Brisbane. For services to the sugar industry and to golf.
- Leslie Victor Price, of Dalby. For outstanding work on behalf of the grain growers of Queensland and Australia.

State of South Australia

- Cecil William Anderson, JP, of Glenelg South. For services to local government, sport and the community.
- Robert Winfred Lyon, BEM, of Belair, lately Director of National Parks in South Australia. For services to the National Parks and to the community.
- Ellinor Gertrude Walker, of Fullarton. For services to the community.
- William Francis Wearn, JP, of Kadina. For services to local government and the community.

State of Tasmania

- Robert Henry Llewelyn Roberts, of Hobart. For services to the wool industry.
- William Thomson Young, JP, of Stowport. For meritorious service as Warden of the Municipality of Burnie.

==== Member of the Order of the British Empire (MBE) ====
Military Division

Royal Navy

- Lieutenant Commander (C.C.F.) Denis William Ball, Royal Naval Reserve.
- Lieutenant Commander (S.C.C.) Clifford Bower, CFM, Royal Naval Reserve.
- Lieutenant Commander Miles Patrick Chapman.
- Captain (S.D.) John Francis Patrick Clooney, Royal Marines.
- Lieutenant (S.L.) (P.) Jeffrey Lawrence Cowan.
- Lieutenant Commander Richard Walter Lonsdale.
- Lieutenant Commander (S.D.) (R.E.) Albert Ernest Luck.
- Lieutenant Commander Charles Harry Miles.
- Acting Instructor Commander Alan Charles Keith Robertson.
- Lieutenant George Albert Tribe, formerly on loan to the Royal Malaysian Navy.
- Lieutenant Commander Ian David Williamson.

Army

- 6400234 Warrant Officer Class II Thomas Cyril Bentley, DCM, The Parachute Regiment.
- Captain (Quartermaster) Charles Oliver Cardwell (480542), 2nd King Edward VII's Own Gurkha Rifles (The Sirmoor Rifles).
- Captain (Quartermaster) Theresa Mary Carroll (490251), Women's Royal Army Corps.
- Major Roger Castle-Smith (437031), Royal Corps of Signals.
- HK/18022801 Warrant Officer Class I Lin Chow, Hong Kong Military Service Corps.
- Major Charles Wemyss Crossland (393109), The Prince of Wales's Own Regiment of Yorkshire.
- Major (now Lieutenant-Colonel) Anthony Willmer Davis (414834), The King's Regiment.
- Major (now Lieutenant-Colonel) Michael John Doyle (430291), The Queen's Regiment.
- Major Philip John Edney (438650), Royal Army Educational Corps.
- Captain Anthony Charles Lawrence Gibson (445864), Royal Corps of Transport (now retired).
- Major Herbert Roy Gilliver (369320), The Gloucestershire Regiment.
- Major Ian Adam Drumearn Gordon (397252) The Royal Highland Fusiliers (Princess Margaret's Own Glasgow and Ayrshire Regiment), lately on loan to the Malawi Army.
- 22954558 Warrant Officer Class I Patrick Arthur Graham, Royal Army Ordnance Corps.
- 4810135 Warrant Officer Class I Thomas Griffiths, 17th/21st Lancers.
- Lieutenant (Quartermaster) George Halewood, MM, (485270), The Parachute Regiment, Territorial and Army Volunteer Reserve.
- Captain Timothy Thomas Hallchurch (469013), Royal Corps of Signals.
- Major Geoffrey Bevan Hill (393171), The King's Own Border Regiment.
- Major (acting) (Quartermaster) Henry Norman Houghton (476220), The Royal Regiment of Fusiliers, serving with Royal Brunei Malay Regiment.
- Major (Director of Music) James Hakin Howe (462157), Scots Guards.
- Major John Albert Jackson (455036), Royal Army Ordnance Corps.
- Major Garry Dene Johnson, MC, (448155), The Royal Green Jackets.
- Captain (Quartermaster) Lewis David Jones (482445), The Royal Green Jackets.
- 19028908 Warrant Officer Class I Thomas Gordon Jones, Corps of Royal Military Police.
- Lieutenant Colin John Keil (489802), Queen's Own Highlanders (Seaforth and Camerons).
- Captain (G.C.O.) (Quartermaster) Kesang Wangdi Lama, BEM, (434961), 10th Princess Mary's Own Gurkha Rifles.
- 22514235 Warrant Officer Class II William Harold Lang, Corps of Royal Electrical and Mechanical Engineers, Territorial and Army Volunteer Reserve.
- 14465125 Warrant Officer Class I James Lattimore, Royal Irish Rangers (27th (Inniskilling) 83rd and 87th).
- Major Harry John Lowles (436567), The Worcestershire and Sherwood Foresters Regiment (29th/45th Foot), lately serving with the British Army Training Team, Kenya.
- Major (acting) Joseph William Neal, TD, (332322), Army Cadet Force.
- Major William James Perry (285468), Royal Corps of Signals.
- Major George Armitage Plews (194238), Royal Corps of Transport.
- Lieutenant-Colonel (acting) Michael William Pollard (382648), Royal Corps of Signals, lately on loan to the Malaysian Armed Forces.
- Captain (Quartermaster) Walter Robins (477338), The Duke of Wellington's Regiment (West Riding).
- 22558347 Warrant Officer Class I Kenneth Rodgers, Royal Army Ordnance Corps.
- 23520006 Warrant Officer Class II Ewart Cowdrey Russell, Royal Army Ordnance Corps, Territorial and Army Volunteer Reserve.
- Major Neville George Saunders, TD, (291338), Royal Army Medical Corps, Territorial and Army Volunteer Reserve.
- 2548225 Warrant Officer Class I John Scaife, Corps of Royal Electrical and Mechanical Engineers.
- 22892988 Warrant Officer Class II Robert MacDonald Slater, BEM, 22 Special Air Service Regiment.
- Major Stephen Robert Anthony Stopford (437176), The Royal Scots Greys (2nd Dragoons).
- 21060240 Warrant Officer Class I George Stanley Thomas, The Gloucestershire Regiment.
- Lieutenant Henry John Thomas (417810), Combined Cadet Force.
- Captain (Quartermaster) Clarence Maurice Tovell (477328), The Parachute Regiment.
- Major (Quartermaster) Thomas Vale (463748), 14th/20th King's Hussars.
- 22612820 Warrant Officer Class I Robert James Walsh, Royal Army Ordnance Corps.
- Captain (Quartermaster) Arthur Victor Worster (477529), The Light Infantry.

Overseas Award

- Major George Edward Kitchener Roylance, ED, Royal Hong Kong Regiment (The Volunteers).

Royal Air Force

- Squadron Leader Ronald Bedford (5028252).
- Squadron Leader Philip Howard Crawshaw (3507118).
- Squadron Leader Malcolm Albert Fish (3120808).
- Squadron Leader William Alexander Ford (4075633).
- Squadron Leader Henry Perry Grinham (166565).
- Squadron Leader Alfred Newton Hulme (3133261).
- Squadron Leader Roy Charles Humphreyson (3150505).
- Squadron Leader Richard Henry Mathews (504658).
- Squadron Leader Peter Crossley Mellett (163753).
- Squadron Leader Frederick Edward Thayer (151186).
- Flight Lieutenant Malcolm Keith Batt (3139122), Royal Air Force Regiment.
- Flight Lieutenant Dennis Alan Davis (4001730).
- Flight Lieutenant William Houldsworth (2209733).
- Flight Lieutenant William Brown Turnbull (1348366).
- Flight Lieutenant Gordon Edward Winfield (1517444).
- Acting Flight Lieutenant Matthew Cowap (4162643).
- Acting Flight Lieutenant Norman Eccles (58023), Royal Air Force Volunteer Reserve (Training Branch).
- Acting Flight Lieutenant Christopher Mullett (1306499).
- Acting Flight Lieutenant Richard Thomas Upton (579249).
- Flying Officer Keith Francis David (4088918).
- Flying Officer Herbert Barrie Hingley (3524102).
- Warrant Officer Lorenza Dowdeswell, BEM, (C0896358), Women's Royal Air Force.
- Warrant Officer Robert Arthur Derek Downing (K3058599).
- Warrant Officer Edward Allister Fraser (A0575011).
- Warrant Officer Norman Henderson (B4022410).
- Warrant Officer Andrew Charles McGown (P0584594).
- Warrant Officer Brian Thomas Rowley (G2469301).
- Warrant Officer Arthur Walter George Simmonds (Q1600266).
- Master Signaller Harry Shaw (B1067839).

Civil Division

- Norman Nunnerley Aitchison. For services to local government in Cheshire.
- Joseph Brian Alexander. For services to agricultural co-operation in the Midland Shires.
- William Anderson, Inspector (Higher Grade), Board of Inland Revenue.
- George William Frederic Archer. For political and public services in Wessex.
- Kenneth Farnsworth Armitage. For services to Crown Green Bowling.
- Edward Donald Arnold, BEM, Chairman, Bedfordshire War Pensions Committee.
- William Percival Authers, Managing Director, Stenner of Tiverton Ltd. For services to Export.
- Stanley Bairstow, Director, Scientific Services Division, British Railways Board.
- John Balderston, Area Superintendent, Southern Area, Ribble Motor Services.
- Bernard William Leighton Baldwin, Secretary, Welsh Amateur Athletic Association.
- Mabel Deborah Mary Barnes. For political services.
- Audrey Frances Adeline Beatty, Staff Officer, Ministry of Education for Northern Ireland.
- Joan Mabel Beauchamp, Higher Executive Officer, Department of Health and Social Security.
- Jenny Douglas Bell, lately Executive Officer, Department of the Environment.
- Richard Leslie Bellis, Ophthalmic Optician, Department of Health and Social Security.
- Thomas Benson, Chief Engineer, Menswear Division, Carrington Viyella Ltd.
- Charlotte Eliza Bentley, Nurse Officer, Royal College of Nursing.
- Betty Bewick, Higher Executive Officer, Overseas Development Administration, Foreign and Commonwealth Office.
- Sarah Elizabeth Black, Honorary Secretary, Carrickfergus Savings Committee, County Antrim.
- Ronald Blackwell, Reproduction Grade AI, Ordnance Survey, Department of the Environment.
- Sheila Elizabeth Blain, Welfare Officer, South West London College.
- Harry Clifford Bloomer, Senior Partner, Harry Bloomer & Son, Architects.
- Nora Cecily Boning, Administrator to British Forces Germany, Women's Royal Voluntary Service.
- Arthur Hollinworth Booth, Senior Executive Officer, Ministry of Defence.
- Margaret Lily Breen, School Nursing Sister, St. Dunstan's Road Treatment Centre, London.
- Ninian George Brennan, Chief Preventive Officer, Board of Customs and Excise.
- Arthur Brian Bridgwater, Director, Bridgwater Brothers (Public Works Contractors) Ltd.
- Andrew Gavin Brown, Senior Experimental Officer, John Innes Institute, Norwich.
- Isabella Brown, Headmistress, Bellenden Infants' School, Peckham.
- Lydia Alberta Brown. For services to Astronomy.
- Alex John Buchan, Fishing Skipper, Peterhead.
- John Albert Buckett, Area Accountant, Bradford Telephone Manager's Office.
- Frederick Bullough, Service Manager, British Leyland Motor Corporation. For services to Export.
- Doris Madeline Burridge, Chairman, South-Eastern Regional Street, Village and Social Organisations Savings Committee.
- Edna Mary Campbell MacFarlane Burton, Senior Personal Secretary, Department of Education and Science.
- Richard Cyril Burtt, Technical Grade A Civil, Department of the Environment.
- Alexander Caldwell, Assistant Chief Constable, Bedfordshire and Luton Constabulary.
- Arthur Samuel Callaghan, Marketing Manager, Dyestuffs Division, Imperial Chemical Industries Ltd. For services to Export.
- Major Simon Campbell, Chairman, Lanarkshire War Pensions Committee.
- Joseph Borg Cardona, Civilian Officer, Malta, Ministry of Defence.
- Charles Cledlyn Charman. For services to Welsh Publishing.
- John Leonard Chew, Executive Officer, Scottish Office.
- Cyril Ernest Child. For services to the community in Colchester, Essex.
- Emily Margaret Christian. For services to Music in the Isle of Man.
- Hugh Brian Clare, Member, Shropshire Agricultural Executive Committee.
- Duncan Cyril Clarke, lately Higher Executive Officer, Department of Health and Social Security.
- William George Clarke, lately Senior Radiographer, Pneumoconiosis Unit, Medical Research Council.
- Kathleen Edna Coles. For political and public services in the East Midlands.
- Patricia Margaret Collins. For services to Art in hospitals.
- John George Collinson, Chief Superintendent, Durham Constabulary.
- Thomas Collinson, Secretary, British Ceramic Research Association.
- Sybil Louise Coltman, Personal Secretary to Executive Director, Passenger, British Railways Board.
- Sheila Mary Colton, lately Higher Executive Officer, Ministry of Defence.
- Norman Leslie Connell, Church Army Captain, Kingston-upon-Hull, Yorkshire.
- Arthur George Conner, Senior Assistant Land Commissioner, Ministry of Agriculture, Fisheries and Food.
- Frederick Hubert Cook, lately District Manager, London Region, Navy, Army and Air Force Institutes.
- Phyllis Rose Coombs, Hostel Manageress, Grade B, Department of Employment.
- Maxwell Wingfield Coussens. For political services in the South East.
- John Stewart Cowan, Resident Engineer, Coke Oven Division, Simon Carves Ltd., Stockport. For services to Export.
- Rachel Crawshay, Organising Secretary, National Gardens Scheme of The Queen's Institute of District Nursing.
- Francis Roy Cripps, Medical Practitioner, RAF Patrington, Hull.
- Douglas Allan Crockatt. For services to the Magistracy in the West Riding of Yorkshire.
- Charles Joseph Crossan, Head Teacher, Woodburn House Horticultural School, Burnside, Rutherglen.
- George Crowther, lately Clerical Assistant, Ministry of Defence.
- Margaret Ruth Cunningham, lately Prison Visitor, HM Prison Winchester.
- John Curdy, Chief Superintendent, Northern Division, City of Glasgow Police.
- Joseph Edmund Cussen, Higher Executive Officer, Royal Mint.
- Lord Arthur Roland Dalby, Higher Executive Officer, Department of the Environment.
- Dorothy Mary Davidson. For services to the welfare of the elderly in Moseley, Birmingham.
- Charles Leonard Davies, Personnel Manager, North Eastern Gas Board.
- Thomas Douglas Dawson, Inshore Fishing Skipper, Seahouses, Northumberland.
- Alfred John Day, Purser/Chief Steward, J. & C. Harrison Ltd.
- Rosamond Mary Day, Programme Organiser, Visitors Department, British Council.
- John Alfred Delves, Grade 4 Officer, Department of Employment.
- Reginald Thomas Doyle, General Manager, City of Leeds Markets Department.
- Bernice Sarah Dummer, Principal, Swansea Training Centre, National Institute for Housecraft (Employment & Training) Ltd.
- John Stanley Dunn, Chief Audiology Technician, Hull Royal Infirmary.
- Frank Frederick Dyer, Project Manager, Engineering, Bagshawe & Co. Ltd. For services to Export.
- George Frederick Eley, Group Managing Director, F. C. Construction (Holdings) Ltd., Derby.
- Albert Eustace, Sales Services Manager, Bristol Engine Division, Rolls-Royce Ltd. For services to Export.
- Arthur Edward Evans, Assistant Head Postmaster, Rhyl, Flintshire.
- Gwendoline Beatrice Evans. For services to the community in Kidderminster.
- Sidney Charles Evans, lately Manager, Luton Sewage Treatment Works.
- Stanley George Farrar, DSM, Chief Office Assistant, House of Lords.
- William Finch, Councillor, Oswaldtwistle Urban District Council.
- Elizabeth Catherine Fisher. For political services.
- William Bernard Follows, Joint Managing Director, Ticket Equipment Ltd., Cirencester. For services to Export.
- William John Forbes, lately Chairman, Bargoed and District Employment Committee.
- William Frame, Chief Superintendent, Metropolitan Police.
- Kathleen Mabel Fraser. For political and public services in Scotland.
- Eric John Atkins Free, Alderman, Marlborough Borough Council.
- Douglas Percy Freeman, Chief Warning Officer, Bristol Group, United Kingdom Warning and Monitoring Organisation.
- Roland French, Area Superintendent, Central Area, United Kingdom Region, Commonwealth War Graves Commission.
- Ronald Ridley Frith, Inspector (Higher Grade), Board of Inland Revenue.
- John Granville Galilee, Honorary Secretary, Institute of Shops Acts Administration.
- Edith Eileen Gallagher. For services to the King George's Fund for Sailors in the Isle of Man.
- Roy Harry George, Joint Managing Director, Celluware Ltd., Consett, County Durham. For services to Export.
- Eric Charles James Gibbons, National Savings District Member, Durham North.
- Janet Riddell Gibling. For services to the Junior Section, Boys' Brigade, Leith.
- Muriel Gibson, Principal Sister Tutor, Friarage Hospital, Northallerton, Yorkshire.
- George Edward Gilbey. For services to the West Riding Voluntary Association foi the Blind.
- Alfred Glaister, Chief Superintendent, Lancashire Constabulary.
- Francis Lawrence Pearce Godfrey, Chairman, Exeter, Barnstaple and District War Pensions Committee.
- Sister Rose Mary Goodear, Headmistress, Benton Grange Approved School for Girls.
- William Goulborn, Divisional Officer, Grade I, Cheshire Fire Brigade.
- Dorothy Barbara Graham, Chairman, Edinburgh Branch, Multiple Sclerosis Society.
- Queenie Victoria Graham, Matron, Sir Alfred Jones Memorial Hospital, Liverpool.
- Alfred James Gray, Officer-in-Charge, Church Army Forces Welfare Centre, Caterham.
- Albert Eugene Guillemard. For services to the Royal British Legion in Birmingham.
- The Right Honourable Beatrice Mary June, Countess of Haddo, Founder and Director, Haddo House Choral Society, Aberdeenshire.
- Mary Alison Glen-Haig. For services to Fencing.
- Kenneth Macqueen Hamilton. For services to the community in Armagh.
- William Ellis Harbord. Finance Officer, Board of Governors, King's College Hospital.
- Vera Armroyd Hargrave, lately Grade 4 Officer, Department of Employment.
- Bernard Henry Hastings. For services to the Royal Naval Association in Nottingham.
- Agnes Dorothy Hathway, Higher Executive Officer, Board of Inland Revenue.
- Harold Cyril LeBatt Havard, lately Commissioner, West Glamorgan District, St. John Ambulance Brigade.
- John Hawkins, Regional Collector, Board of Inland Revenue.
- Leonard Vincent Culworth Hawkins, Higher Executive Officer, Board of Inland Revenue.
- Robert James Heathwood, BEM, lately Honorary Divisional Officer, Northern Ireland Fire Authority.
- William Leslie Herbert, Senior Probation Officer, Middlesex Probation and After-Care Area.
- Diana Emily Hoggins, Nursing Officer, Littlemore Hospital, Oxford.
- Stanley Hope, Honorary Secretary, Rochdale and District Community Relations Council.
- Gladys Mary Hoult, Secretary to the Docks Manager, British Transport Docks Board, Grimsby.
- Captain Charles Stanley Howe, Master MV Teviot Bank, Andrew Weir & Co. Ltd.
- Francis Hughes. For services to the textile industry in Northern Ireland.
- Benjamin Hutchison Humble. For services to Mountaineering and Mountain Safety in Scotland.
- Albert James Sidney Hunt, Senior Area Inspector, London Area, British Waterways Board.
- Thomas Baird Hutchison, Technical Manager, Transportation Department, Esso Petroleum Co. Ltd.
- Archibald Spencer Ireson, Secretary, Men of the Stones.
- Richard Cook Jackson. For political services in Yorkshire.
- Esme Muriel James, lately Curator of Chequers.
- Gwynfryn Lewis James. For services to the Royal British Legion in Wales.
- Raymond Jarman. For services to patients in the Young Chronic Sick Unit, Scotton Banks Hospital, Knaresborough.
- Charles McIntyre Johnston, Higher Executive Officer, Royal Naval Aircraft Yard, Belfast, Ministry of Defence.
- Lieutenant-Colonel Francis William Johnston, lately Organising Secretary, National Association of Boys' Clubs, Hertfordshire.
- Nora Nicholas Johnstone, Dental Hygienist, City of Edinburgh School Health Service.
- Clementina Victoria Jones, lately Matron, Samuel Lewis Seaside Convalescent Home, Walton-on-Naze.
- John Arthur Jones, Clerk to the Knighton Rural District Council, Radnorshire.
- John Eurfyl James Jones, President, Merioneth Savings Committee.
- Richard John Stewart-Jones, Superintendent, Clean Shop, Nuclear Department, Rolls-Royce Ltd.
- Kathleen Iris Daphne King, Personal Assistant to the Director, Seafarers' Education Service and College of the Sea.
- Albert Sidney Kingdon, lately Journalist, Western Morning News.
- Agnes Mary Kirton, BEM, lately County Organiser, Durham, Women's Royal Voluntary Service.
- Eileen Winifred Knight, Chief Superintendent of Typists, Cabinet Office.
- Nancy Charlotte Knox. For services to the community in Watford.
- Robert Francis Knox, Secretary, British Brush Manufacturers' Association.
- Herbert Thorpe Knutton, Founder Chairman, Knaresborough Old People's Welfare Association.
- Flight Lieutenant Ian Ladley, Flying Instructor, Ministry of Defence.
- Edwin Latham, Experimental Officer, Scottish Marine Biological Association.
- Walter Laughton, Clerk of the Council and Chief Executive Officer, Sutton-in-Ashfield Urban District Council.
- Lorentzo Laurentziades, lately Administrative Official, Cyprus, Navy, Army and Air Force Institutes.
- Edgar Leach, TD, Higher Executive Officer, Department of Health and Social Security.
- Howard Ledger, Senior Engineer, Plessey Telecommunications Ltd., Beeston, Nottingham.
- John Thomas Lewis, TD, Supplies Officer, Devon County Council.
- Arthur Edward Light, Chairman, Essex Trustee Savings Bank.
- Bernard George Lingen. For political and public services in the West Midlands.
- George Geoffrey Lister, Surveyor, Board of Customs and Excise.
- Cyril Arthur Littlewood, Director of Youth Services, World Wildlife Fund.
- Edith Marion Littlewood, County Organiser, Gloucestershire, Women's Royal Voluntary Service.
- Morgan Lloyd. For services to Music in Wales.
- William Robert Shurmer Lochery, lately Grade 3 Officer, Department of Employment.
- Iris Lofting, Foreign and Commonwealth Office.
- Harold Lowcock, MM. For services to local government in Ripon and Pateley Bridge, Yorkshire.
- David Thomson McGarrie, District Coastguard Officer, Ramsey, Isle of Man, Department of Trade and Industry.
- Catherine Ann Gilchrist McKechnie, lately Postmaster, Glenrothes Sub-Office, Fife.
- John McKnight, Councillor, Welwyn Garden City Urban District Council.
- Ida Soley Mackveley, Headmistress, Stow Heath County Infants School, Wolverhampton.
- Francis Walter MacMillan, lately Headmaster, Kingswood Special School, Wolverhampton.
- James Hugh Maddocks, Chief Superintendent, Mid-Anglia Constabulary.
- Walter George Edmund Maidment, Gymnastic Coach, Cardiff Education Committee.
- Bernard Frank Manicom, Inspector, Board of Inland Revenue.
- Harry George Markell, Special Adviser to the Commercial Director, Guided Weapons Division, British Aircraft Corporation Ltd. For services to Export.
- Anthony Neale Somers Marshall, Charge Nurse, Forest Hospital, Horsham.
- Charles Ridings Marshall, Chairman, Doncaster National Insurance Local Tribunal.
- Donald Norman Marshall, Road Safety Officer, Mid-Cheshire Road Safely Committee.
- James Elvet Harries Martin. For services to agriculture in Pembrokeshire.
- Leslie Stuart Martin, General Manager, Manchester and Salford Trustee Savings Bank.
- Frederick Alan Martineau. For political and public services in the South-East.
- Charles Forbes Mason, Company Secretary, Texaco Ltd. (United Kingdom).
- John Mearns, lately Assistant to the Archivist, Lloyd's Register of Shipping.
- William Ernest Merrett, A General Works Manager, M. B. Metals Ltd.
- George Cameron Millar, Editor, The Scottish Farmer.
- John Frederick Davey Miller, Secretary, Trustee Savings Banks Association.
- William Henry Mirfin, lately Area Industrial Relations Officer, National Coal Board.
- Henry Robert Moles, Chairman, Battersea Local Employment Committee.
- Barbara Wendy Monck, Senior Executive Officer, Department for National Savings.
- Harry Wray Morgan, Higher Executive Officer, Metropolitan Police Office.
- Johanna Moriarty, Principal Nursing Officer, Monyhull Hospital, Birmingham.
- Elizabeth Maude Morton. For services to the deaf in Northern Ireland.
- Michael Joseph Murphy, Farmer. For services to agriculture in Northern Ireland.
- James Murray, Principal Foreman of Stores, Ministry of Defence.
- William Mutch, Engineering Inspector of Works, Inverness County Council.
- Maurice Raymond Neville, MC. For services to the Electrical and Electronics Industries Benevolent Association.
- William Nichol, Higher Executive Officer, Ministry of Defence.
- William Nichols, Vice-President, Hackney Borough Savings Committee.
- Joseph Slater Nicholson, Headmaster, Delf Hill Middle School, Bradford.
- Mary Joan Nicholson, Executive Officer, Ministry of Defence.
- John Patrick O'Connell, Supervising Stores Officer, Home Office.
- Kenneth Oldfield, Assistant Works Manager (Flight), Hawker Siddeley Aviation Ltd.
- Mary Roseanne O'Reilly, Higher Executive Officer, House of Commons.
- Philip James Orr, Intelligence Officer II, Ministry of Defence.
- George Alan Orton, Manager, Standards, Tubes Group, British Steel Corporation. For services to the British Standards Institution.
- Lieutenant-Commander Roland Edward Osborne, Royal Naval Reserve, Chairman, Horley Sea Cadet Corps Unit.
- Joseph Henry Ostridge, Engineering Assistant, Durham County Council.
- John McLay Oswald, Secretary, Paisley College of Technology.
- Henry Lloyd Owen, lately Divisional Pests Officer, Ministry of Agriculture, Fisheries and Food.
- William Joseph Owen, Chairman, Rotherham and District Local Employment Committee.
- Winifred Kate Palmer, Vice-Chairman, Plymouth Command, Women's Royal Naval Service Benevolent Trust.
- Arthur John Martin Papworth, Controller, Customer Engineering Service Organisation, Southern Division, International Computers Ltd.
- Margaret Parry, Nursing Officer, Accident and Emergency Department, Kettering and District General Hospital.
- John Arthur Pattern, Treasurer, No. 2040 (Richmond) Squadron Committee, Air Training Corps.
- James Reginald Patton, Vice-Chairman, Exeter and District Savings Committee.
- Keith Temple Payne, Honorary Secretary, Leysian Mission, City Road, London.
- Thomas Percival Payton, Senior Executive Officer, Department of Health and Social Security.
- Frank William Peach, Assistant Engineer, Development Control, Essex County Council.
- William Cyril Penney, Shipping Master, HM Dockyard, Portsmouth, Ministry of Defence.
- Frederick David Linley Penny. For services to Music in Southend-on-Sea.
- Reginald Charles Percivall, Managing Director, A. Matts & Son Ltd., Building and Civil Engineering Contractors.
- Cathryn Ratcliffe Perry, Organiser, Kilmarnock Large Burgh, Women's Royal Voluntary Service.
- Joan Arrowsmith Pietre. For political services in Lancashire.
- Harold James Plater, Assistant Manager, Studio Operations, Television, British Broadcasting Corporation.
- Godfrey Lloyd Plumbridge, Warden, Percy Boys' Club, Bath.
- Daphne Marjorie Potterton, Senior Social Therapist, Warley Hospital, Brentwood.
- Jessie May Potty, lately Welfare Superintendent, Electric & Musical Industries Ltd.
- Frank Priest, Deputy Clerk to the Justices, Petty Sessional Division, Sutton, Surrey.
- Arthur Francis Ratcliff. For services to the community in Maldon, Essex.
- Percy Ratcliffe, lately Sales Manager and Purchasing Officer, Royal National Institute for the Blind.
- Percy George Read, Deputy Works Manager, Westland Helicopters Ltd., Yeovil. For services to Export.
- Olive Joan Redsell, Superintendent of Typists, Ministry of Defence.
- William Austen Reynolds, Chairman, East Midland Regional Educational Savings Committee.
- Mary Richards, Chief Nursing Officer, Caernarvonshire County Council.
- John Evan Roberts, Honorary Secretary, Porthdinllaen Lifeboat Station.
- John Thomas Roberts. For services to the National Association of Boys' Clubs in Winnington, Cheshire.
- Colonel Raymond Wallace Robins Roberts, TD, Clerk to the Durham Executive Council, National Health Service.
- Sheila Mary Roberts, Duty Controller (Observer Lieutenant), Royal Observer Corps.
- Constance Ellen Robins, lately District Nurse and Midwife, Berkshire.
- John Robert Robinson, Executive Officer, Department of Health and Social Security.
- Vera Robinson, Assistant Mistress, Bolckow Road Junior Mixed School, Grangetown, Teesside.
- Edward Mark Rogers. For services to the Institute of Technicians in Venereology.
- Frank Rogers, Senior Experimental Officer, Harwell, United Kingdom Atomic Energy Authority.
- Dorothy Laura Roose, Centre Organiser, Rhyl Urban District, Women's Royal Voluntary Service, Flintshire.
- Peter Ludwig Rosenfeld, Member, Research Committee, Central Training Council.
- Angus Archibald Ross, Motorway Engineer, Leicestershire County Council.
- David Hugh Ross, lately Head Forester, Forestry Commission, Scotland.
- Marjory Thelma Ruse, Executive Producer, Adult Education and Religious Programmes, Thames Television Ltd.
- John Rush, Construction Works Manager, Robert M. Douglas (Contractors) Ltd.
- Jean Templeton Russell, Organising Secretary, Glasgow Marriage Guidance Council.
- Thomas Austen Rutherford, Higher Executive Officer, Department of Health and Social Security.
- Ida Sanders, Ward Sister, St. James' Hospital, Leeds.
- Mary Scott. For social services to Youth and to the Elderly in Middleton, Manchester.
- Leslie Baden Sell. For services to the Scout Association in Bedfordshire.
- Eveline Gladys Selmes, Clinic Sister and Midwife, Skegness District Hospital.
- Ralph Semple, Councillor, Chadderton Urban District Council.
- Joan Ann Shepheard, Centre Organiser, Crawley Urban District, Women's Royal Voluntary Service.
- Edward William Shoebridge. For political services in Yorkshire.
- Captain Roy Horace Short, Master, Southampton, Isle of Wight and South of England Royal Mail Steam Packet Co. Ltd.
- Douglas George Atkinson Simmons, General Sales Manager, R. & W. Watson Ltd., Linwood, Renfrewshire. For services to Export.
- Jeanie Margaret Louttit Sinclair, Executive Officer, Scottish Development Department. Lately of Department of Trade and Industry.
- Barbara Skinner, Higher Executive Officer, Ministry of Defence.
- William Thomas Slade, Senior Staff Pilot, Airwork Services Ltd.
- Margaret Elizabeth Stuart Sleath, Assistant International Officer, War on Want.
- Arnold Smith, Senior Executive Officer, Department of Health and Social Security.
- Henry James Smith, Engineer II, Ministry of Defence.
- Philip Trevor Smith, Regional Director, National Federation of Building Trades Employers, Midland Region.
- Shaun Southgate, Foreign and Commonwealth Office.
- Joseph Harold Speed, Chairman, Bebington Council of Social Service.
- John Beltram Spencer, Appointments Manager, New Zealand Shipping Company Ltd.
- Ronald William Spencer, Mate, Royal Corps of Transport Fleet, Ministry of Defence.
- Thomas Benjamin Spurway, Audit Examiner, Department of the Environment.
- Stanley Ernest Squires, Senior Administrative Officer, Birmingham Fire and Ambulance Service.
- Geoffrey Stapleton, Divisional Surveyor, Motorways, Worcestershire County Council.
- Charles Steer, Export Manager, Swizzels Ltd. For services to Export.
- Jessie Stephenson, Chief Nursing Officer, East Riding of Yorkshire.
- Williamina Mary Stevenson, District Nurse, Westray, Orkney.
- John McLennan Stewart, District Officer and County Organiser, Suffolk, National Union of Agricultural and Allied Workers.
- Alfred Milner Stott, Clerical Officer, HM Land Registry.
- Frederick William Ernest Strange, Printing Office Manager, Department of Trade and Industry.
- Yvonne Marjorie Streatfeild, Research Editor, Institute for Strategic Studies.
- Charles James Sugrue, Senior Driving Examiner, Department of the Environment.
- Ina Bain Sutherland, Honorary Secretary, Lochaber Savings Committee.
- Daniel Hughes Taggart, Member, Dunbarton County Council.
- Leslie Frederick Tagholm, Head of Service Planning Section, Research Department, British Broadcasting Corporation.
- Reginald Maxfield Tate, Second Master, Royal Hospital School, Holbrook, Ministry of Defence.
- Ernest Taylor, Technical Officer Grade B, Department of the Environment.
- Julia Marie Taylor, Director, The Bodley Head Ltd.
- Frederick John Thacker, lately General Manager, Enham Village Centre, Hampshire.
- Cyril Thomas, Principal Officer, Monmouthshire County Council Offices.
- Jack Sidney Thomas, Honorary Secretary, Friends of Kelling Hospital Association, Norfolk.
- Walter Page Thomson. For services connected with transport for the disabled in Scotland.
- John Geoffrey Tilley, Chairman, Huddersfield Savings Committee.
- Fredrick William Titterington, Honorary Secretary, Crosby Savings Committee.
- Robert John Tooley. For political services in East Anglia.
- William John Toon, lately Member, Burton-upon-Trent Executive Council.
- William Joyce Topley, Operating Superintendent, Northern Ireland Railways.
- Christine Rowena Totman, National Savings District Member for East Berkshire.
- Herman Paton Travis, Group Secretary, Bolton and District Hospital Management Committee.
- Mary Troop, lately Councillor, Clitheroe Rural District Council.
- Ena Tubman, Registrar, Births, Deaths and Marriages, Dalton Sub-District, Ulverston Registration District.
- Stanley James Tunstall, Headmaster, Longford Special School, Gloucester.
- Ethelwyn Tynan. For social services in Northamptonshire.
- Ambrose Philip Tyrwhitt, Navigational Briefing Officer, British Overseas Airways Corporation.
- George Thomas Underbill, Higher Executive Officer, Department of Health and Social Security.
- Joseph Jackson Unsworth, Chief Officer, Halifax Fire Brigade.
- John William Walker, lately Chief Superintendent, Warwickshire and Coventry Constabulary.
- Ronald Crompton Walker, Apprentice Training Supervisor, National Bus Company.
- Anthony Thomas Wall, Technical Engineer, Section Leader Development, Bristol Engine Division, Rolls-Royce Ltd.
- William George Waller, Higher Clerical Officer, Board of Inland Revenue.
- Captain William Warden, Master, MV Cape Horn, Scottish Ship Management Ltd.
- Ernest Warrington. For services to sport especially in Wallasey.
- Edward Terry Watkins, Home and Export Sales Director, Steelfab Ltd., Cardiff. For services to Export.
- Eileen Margaret Watson, Overseas Personnel Officer, Save the Children Fund.
- Mary Wilmot Watson. For services to youth in Berkshire.
- Hilda May Webb. For political services in the London area.
- Edgar Albert Weeks, Clerical Officer, Ministry of Defence.
- Frederick Lewis West, Superintendent of Inspection, Weapons Research Establishment, Aldermaston, United Kingdom Atomic Energy Authority.
- Pattie Boon Whetton, lately Chairman, Don Valley Divisional Education Executive.
- Helen McGill White, Organising Secretary, Edinburgh and South-East Scotland Blood Transfusion Service.
- Violet Wigglesworth, Secretary to the Comptroller, Trafalgar Services Club, Portsmouth.
- Edward Joseph Wigley, BEM, Schoolmaster, Hayle Secondary Modern School, Cornwall.
- Felicy Anny Willheim, Senior Assistant, Public Relations Department, The Electricity Council.
- Constance Irene Williams. For political and public services in Wales.
- James Williams, lately General Medical Practitioner, Grantown-on-Spey, Morayshire.
- Grace Winifred Wilson, Senior Inspector of Schools, Warwickshire Local Education Authority.
- Ronald Wood, Headmaster, Valley Primary School, Kirkcaldy.
- Joy Leonora Phyllis Woods, Chairman, Eastern Regional Street, Village and Social Organisations Savings Committee.
- Reginald George Woodward, Senior Executive Assistant, London Transport Executive.
- Neville Worden, Works Manager, Marwin Machine Tools Ltd.
- Sydney Wright, Manager, British Department, Thomas Cook & Son Ltd.
- Ronald James Wyatt, Export Sales Manager, Pasolds Ltd., Langley, Buckinghamshire. For services to Export.
- Alice Olwen Yeoman. For services to road safety for children in Barry, Glamorgan.
- Leslie Robert Young, Head of Overseas Department, J. E. Hanger & Co. Ltd. For services to Export.

Diplomatic Service and Overseas List

- William John Anderson, Locally Established Grade I Officer, HM Embassy, Paris.
- Henry William John Barkshire. For services to British interests in Greece.
- Catherine Barzey, Administrative Sister, Glendon Hospital, Montserrat.
- Marguerite Lorna Bascom, Assistant Secretary, Ministry of Communications and Works, Dominica.
- James Samuel Bell, Director, Save the Children Fund, Nigeria.
- Geoffrey Whitworth Bewley. For social and welfare services in Kenya.
- Daisy Bishop, Administrative Secretary, St. Michael's Mission Hospital, Batlharos, Cape Province.
- Grahame Stanley Blundell, Exposition Administrator, Hong Kong.
- Arnold Richard Brittle, Officer-in-Charge of Criminal Records Office, Police Headquarters, Swaziland.
- Amy Juliette Bust. For services to education in Iraq.
- Edward Albert Camp. For public services in St. Helena.
- Cheung Chi-fan. For services to education in Hong Kong.
- John Henry Clarke, Second Secretary (New Works), British High Commission, Rawalpindi.
- Leonard Charles Cooper. For services to British interests in Kenya.
- William Wolf Cowen, MRCS, LRCP, lately Medical Officer of Health, Lusaka, Zambia.
- Jack Cox. For services to British interests in Muscat.
- Denis Stanley Cross, British Vice-Consul, Zurich.
- Georgette Gabrielle Marie Deakin. For services to the British Red Cross Society in Brunei.
- Ian Harrison Dunlop. For services to British cultural interests in Sweden.
- Paul de la Haye Duponsel, Honorary British Vice-Consul, Tamatave, Malagasy Republic.
- Samson Patrick Fonseka, Auditor, Seychelles.
- Leslie George Firman. For services to the British community in Brussels.
- Mary Patricia Flanagan, lately Personal Assistant to the Head of the United Kingdom Delegation to the European Communities.
- Fleur Judith Fraser, Personal Assistant to HM Ambassador, Cairo.
- Myra Charlotte Fraser. For services to education in the British Solomon Islands Protectorate.
- Whitney Frederick. For services to the Carib community in Dominica.
- Jean Garlick, Lecturer Grade I, Yundum College, The Gambia.
- Eversley William Gittens. For services to tourism in Grenada.
- Jane Anne Gledhill, lately Nursing Sister with British Medical Team, Laos.
- John Millward Hall, Agricultural Project Manager, Malawi.
- Leslie Brooke Harmer. For services to communications in Bermuda.
- Mary Isabella Antonia Haseldine, Executive Officer, HM Embassy, Dublin.
- William Macintosh Hutcheon, Commercial Officer, British Government Office, Toronto.
- Leslie Jackson, Chief Operations Officer, Department of Civil Aviation, Malawi.
- Patrick William James, Grade 9 Officer, British High Commission, Tonga.
- Agnes Geraldine Jongue. For services to nursing in St. Lucia.
- Anthony Paul Jordan, Assistant Architect, Ministry of Works, Lesotho.
- Winson Templeman Aldershott Keens-Douglas. For services to the community in Grenada.
- Michael Knight, HM Consul (Information), Osaka.
- Lieutenant-Commander Stanley Charles Knight, Royal Navy (Retired), lately British Council Administrative Officer, Brazil.
- James Raynor Llewellyn, lately Grade 9 Officer, HM Embassy, Havana.
- Marjorie Winifred Lloyd, lately First Secretary (Information), HM Embassy, Copenhagen.
- Captain Kevin Adair Lowry, lately Assistant Commissioner, Botswana Police Force.
- Margaret Mackay. For services to the British community in Paris.
- Samuel Dugald William McPhee, Commandant, Bermuda Reserve Constabulary.
- The Reverend John Kenneth Main, Superintendent Minister of the Ngamiland District, Botswana.
- Vera Martin, lately Shorthand-Typist, HM Embassy, Stockholm.
- John Martinez, Principal Officer, Gibraltar Prison Service.
- Serge Jean Maubec, Government Printer, Lesotho.
- Joyce Lilian Milton. For charitable services to the British community in Madrid.
- Peter James Moore. For services to medical research in Cameroon.
- Olive Joyce Munro, Office Manager, Foreign Exchange Control Department, Bermuda.
- Euphrasia Nanty, Nursing Sister, Medical Department, Seychelles.
- John Kent Nye, Superintendent (Road Construction), Ministry of Works, Kenya.
- Harry Theodore Clark Parkin, lately First Secretary, HM Embassy, Washington.
- Dorothy Mary Payne. For services to education and to the British community in Lagos.
- Yvonne Kathleen Planje, Personal Assistant to Minister (Commercial), HM Embassy, Rio de Janeiro.
- Gordon Sedgwick Planner. For services to British commercial interests in the Soviet Union.
- Elizabeth Richards, Information Officer, British Government Office, Montreal.
- Alfreda Roberts, Grade 9 Officer, British High Commission, Canberra.
- Patricia Robson. For nursing and welfare services in West Malaysia.
- John Dudley Romer, Pest Control Officer, Hong Kong.
- Sister Mary Columba Ryan. For educational and welfare services in Botswana.
- Hazel Margaret St. John. For services to education in the Lebanon.
- Pauline Luvina Sandy. For services to the Girl Guides' Association and the community in St. Vincent.
- Diana Key Sellors, lately Headmistress, St. Mary's Secondary School, Kuala Lumpur, Malaysia.
- Dorothy Hazel Sim. For services to the community in Penang.
- Maurice Sullivan, Second Secretary (Commercial), HM Embassy, Madrid.
- John Thomas Summerfield, lately Clerk to the House of Assembly, Gibraltar.
- The Reverend losia Taomia, Secretary, Ellice Islands Protestant Church.
- Bertha Florence Taylor, Senior Departmental Sister, Victoria Hospital, St. Lucia.
- Tsang Chiu-yan, Market Manager Class I, Fish Marketing Organisation, Hong Kong.
- Charles Raymond Whittingdale, lately Second Secretary (Administration), HM Embassy, Aden.
- Edward Gene Williams, Deputy Permanent Secretary, Lesotho.
- Francis Egerton Williams. For services to the community and to the banana industry in St. Vincent.
- Signa Leonie Yorke. For services to education in British Honduras.
- Hilda Madeline Young. For services to education in Kuwait.
- Yu Look-yau. For services to the community in Hong Kong.

Australian States
State of New South Wales

- Henry Seekamp Belling. For services to the community.
- Sheila Margaret Blackmore. For services to the community.
- Charles William Blunt. For services to sport.
- Frederick Dorcen Bolin. For services to local government.
- George Eric Borwick. For services to sport.
- Elizabeth Stella Cromarty. For services to medicine.
- Dorothy Dies (Dolly Dyer). For services to television and broadcasting.
- Alfred Harold Hodge. For services to the community.
- Harold Roy Matthews. For services to sport.
- Violet Maude Medway. For services to education.
- Bessie Mitchell. For services to education.
- Frederick George Rivers. For services to ex-servicemen.
- Esca Richmond Stephens. For services to sport.
- Nellie Kathleen Stephenson. For services to nursing.
- Elemer Anthony Szorkovszky. For services to the community.
- Charles Kingsley Ward. For services to the State.
- Edna Alice White. For services to nursing.

State of Victoria

- Lillian Elhe Andrews, of Auburn. For services to mental health.
- Elsie Gwendolen St. John Clarke, of Newtown, Geelong. For services to the community.
- Geoffrey James Clarke, of Camberwell. For services to scouting.
- Florence Jean Fox, of Canterbury. For services to the community, especially to the elderly.
- Herbert Godbehear, of Ballarat. For services to education.
- Florence Myrtle Hales, of Northcote. For services to the community.
- Marie Victoria Landt, of Horsham. For services to the community.
- Phillip Joseph Meehan, of Culgoa. For services to the community.
- Councillor Lester Clarence Mitchell, of Hopetoun. For services to primary industry and the community.
- Stanley Thomas Parkes, of Middle Brighton. For services to the building industry as an architect.
- Councillor Trevor Owen Smith, of Dundonnell. For services to local government.
- Councillor John Alexander Welsh, of Warrnambool. For services to local government.

State of Queensland

- Herbert Biddle, of Kingaroy. For services to first aid work and to the community.
- Doris Broomfield, of Brisbane. For services to nursing.
- Hector Clyde Goody, of Mungungo, via Monto. For services to the grazing industry and civic affairs.
- Lilian Bessie Gresham, of Brisbane. For services to the community, especially the Girl Guide Movement.
- Councillor William Frederick Kajewski, of Glencoe, via Oakey. For services to the community.
- Lewis Beaton Sangster Reid, of Innisfail. For services to education.
- Arthur William Shepherd, of Dow's Creek, via Mackay. For services to the sugar industry.

State of South Australia

- Raffaele DeMarco, JP, of Felixstowe. For services to the community.
- Reverend Father James Dunne, of Streaky Bay. For services as Parish Priest in many areas of South Australia.
- Clare Beatrice Alice Horseman, of Clarence Park. For services to the community as a member of the St. John Ambulance Brigade.
- Oswald William Frederick Montgomery, of Woodville Park. For services to the community, especially the welfare of youth.
- Zita Elizabeth Nalty, of Prospect. Stenographer-Secretary to the Premier of South Australia.

State of Tasmania

- Elizabeth Gladys Johnson, of Hobart. For services to the community.
- Gilbert Barry Leitch, of Hobart. For services to the timber industry.
- Henry Edward Sulzberger, of Launceston. Manager/Secretary of the United Protestant Association's Eventide Homes for the Aged.

=== Order of the Companions of Honour (CH) ===
- Charles Herbert Best, CBE, FRS. For services to Medical Research.
- Sir Arthur Edward Drummond Bliss, KCVO. For services to Music.
- The Right Honourable John Grey Gorton, MP, Minister for Defence, lately Prime Minister of the Commonwealth of Australia.

=== Companion of the Imperial Service Order (ISO) ===
Home Civil Service

- Francis Richard Baird, Senior Principal, Department of Trade and Industry.
- Herbert Cyril Gordon Barwick, Senior Principal, Department of the Environment.
- Arthur Edward Bleksley, Principal, Board of Inland Revenue.
- Albert William Bunn, Principal, Ministry of Agriculture, Fisheries and Food.
- Eric James Burnett, Senior Inspector, Board of Inland Revenue.
- Samuel Astbury Cook, Principal, Civil Service Department.
- William Stewart Duthie, Senior Principal, Department of Health and Social Security.
- Olive Frances Griffiths, Grade 2 Officer, Department of Employment.
- Frederick Lionel Hill, MBE, Naval Steel Superintendent, Ministry of Defence.
- Herbert Beresford Hinton, Chief Clerk, Central Office of the Supreme Court.
- Alec Henry Horler, Official Receiver, Southampton, Department of Trade and Industry.
- Innes Jack Wynhall Lincoln, Principal, Department of Trade and Industry.
- Duncan Mackenzie, Governor, HM Prison Barlinnie, Glasgow.
- Mabel Moss, Principal, Ministry of Defence.
- Leonard Percival William Murphy, Principal, Department of the Environment.
- Alfred Richardson, Principal, Department of Health and Social Security.
- Francis Digby Riddett, Principal, Welsh Office.
- William Edward Sedgwick, Assistant Director, Ministry of Defence.
- Donald Byard Stanley, Senior Inspector, Board of Customs and Excise.
- Kenneth George Taylor, ERD, Principal, Department for National Savings.
- Edward Richards Timothy, Senior Estate Surveyor, Department of the Environment.
- Winifred Margaret Turner, MBE, (Mrs. Cragg), Deputy Director of Audit, Exchequer and Audit Department.
- Clement George Wardrop, ERD, Foreign and Commonwealth Office.

Diplomatic Service and Overseas List

- John Tweddell Downes, lately Assistant Financial Secretary (Complementing and Gradings), Hong Kong.
- Gerald Alexander Isaacs, Comptroller of Customs, Bahama Islands.
- John Vanham Green Mitchell, Commissioner of Registration, Hong Kong.

Australian States
State of New South Wales

- Arthur Gerald Kingsmill, lately Under-secretary, Chief Secretary's Department.

State of Victoria

- Alexander Russel Whatmore, lately Director-General of Social Welfare.

State of Queensland

- Gordon Keith Daniel Murphy, lately Director-General of Education.

=== British Empire Medal (BEM) ===
Military Division

Royal Navy

- Acting Fleet Chief Petty Officer (T.A.S.I.) John Kenneth Ashton, P/JX 833241.
- Chief Petty Officer Writer Anthony John Beddow, D/MX 870199.
- Colour Sergeant Frederick Gerald Bishop, RM 14541.
- Chief Wren Welfare Worker Maureen Lilian Clarke, 58315.
- Marine Engineering Artificer 1st Class (P) Arthur Edwin Cliff, P/MX 767340.
- Chief Ordnance Electrical Artificer Richard Reginald Napier Coombes, D/MX 62525.
- Marine Engineering Artificer 1st Class (H) Frederick Charles Crichton, P/MX 863689.
- Acting Fleet Chief Marine Engineering Mechanic John Henry Dare, D/KX 914803.
- Colour Sergeant Desmond James Fowler, RMR 202594.
- Chief Radio Supervisor Edward Hayward, P/JX 834147.
- Leading Electrical Mechanic (Air) Harry Heath, L/FX 874349.
- Chief Petty Officer Coxswain Philip Hinde, D/JX 766403.
- Acting Fleet Chief Petty Officer (C.D.I) Robert Harold Holland, P/JX 836326.
- Chief Marine Engineering Mechanic Robert Frank James, D/KX 83721.
- Acting Fleet Chief Control Electrical Mechanician Michael Joseph Jones, P/MX 836842.
- Chief Petty Officer Coxswain Vincent Owen Jones, D/JX 712923.
- Aircraft Mechanician (A.E.) 1st Class David Charles Leach, L/FX 882116.
- Chief Petty Officer Steward Tung On Leung, O.1918.
- Medical Technician 1st Class Albert Edward Mair, P/MX 60473.
- Acting Fleet Chief Petty Officer (G.I.) John Stewart McKnight, P/JX 646131.
- Mr. Patrick Meade, Carpenter, Royal Fleet Auxiliary Service.
- Colour Sergeant Robert James Nelson, RM 12905.
- Chief Marine Engineering Artificer (P) Thomas William Quaye, L/FX 768502.
- Grade I (Plot) Jessie Phoebe Searle, PH/W34, Royal Naval Reserve.
- Chief Petty Officer Medical Assistant John Alexander Smith, Q991923, Royal Naval Reserve.
- Acting Chief Control Electrical Mechanician Terence Patrick Spurling, P/MX 89524.
- Chief Ordnance Electrical Artificer Alan James Telfer, P/MX 842991.
- Aircraft Mechanician (O) 2nd Class Colin Leslie Thorne, L/F 951607.
- Acting Fleet Chief Aircraft Mechanician (A.E/I) Jeffery Clifton Williams, L/FX 814573.

Army

- 22926975 Sergeant George Ainslie, Royal Army Pay Corps.
- 22295717 Staff Sergeant James Barnetl Anderson, The Black Watch (Royal Highland Regiment).
- 23525411 Corporal John Askew, Royal Corps of Signals.
- 23773034 Sergeant Arthur Gerald Atkins, Royal Army Ordnance Corps.
- 19054121 Sergeant Brian Reginald Bane, Corps of Royal Electrical and Mechanical Engineers.
- 23057441 Staff Sergeant Michael John Bishop, Royal Army Medical Corps.
- 23862348 Staff Sergeant Ernest Arthur Blunden, Royal Army Medical Corps, Territorial and Army Volunteer Reserve.
- 23494209 Staff Sergeant Ian Morris Brown, Corps of Royal Military Police.
- 19034744 Staff Sergeant George Edward Buffham, Royal Regiment of Artillery (now discharged).
- W/206643 Sergeant (acting) Winifred Ethel Bugg, Women's Royal Army Corps.
- 22511094 Staff Sergeant George Daniel Campbell, The Parachute Regiment.
- 21023446 Sergeant Patrick Joseph Carroll, Royal Regiment of Artillery.
- 23661240 Staff Sergeant Norman Hector Ford, Corps of Royal Engineers.
- 22537197 Sergeant William Gray, Royal Corps of Signals.
- 23553928 Staff Sergeant Peter George Hamp, Royal Army Ordnance Corps.
- 19046890 Sergeant Joseph Hayden, The Royal Irish Rangers (27th (Inniskilling) 83rd and 87th).
- 22240578 Sergeant Harry Hornby, Corps of Royal Engineers (now discharged).
- 23924811 Sergeant Raymond David Jenkinson, The Queen's Regiment.
- 23708156 Staff Sergeant Roger Jones, Corps of Royal Engineers.
- 21148678 Sergeant Lalbahadur Rai, Gurkha Transport Regiment.
- 23878967 Staff Sergeant Fred Laverick, Royal Corps of Signals.
- 22717819 Staff Sergeant Roderick Lodge, Corps of Royal Military Police.
- 7961734 Staff Sergeant Derek Guilford Matthews, 17th/21st Lancers.
- 23494752 Sergeant James McNeil, The Royal Highland Fusiliers (Princess Margaret's Own Glasgow and Ayrshire Regiment).
- 22301578 Warrant Officer Class II (Local) Harry Meadowcroft, Corps of Royal Engineers.
- 23485938 Sergeant Simon Percy Nuttall, Corps of Royal Electrical and Mechanical Engineers.
- 22287215 Staff Sergeant James John Stuart Ord, The Parachute Regiment.
- 23530036 Staff Sergeant Roy Owens, Royal Corps of Transport.
- 22253228 Sergeant Edward Pullen Reynolds, Royal Army Pay Corps, Territorial and Army Volunteer Reserve.
- 22253313 Staff Sergeant Albert Stanley Shell, Royal Corps of Transport, Territorial and Army Volunteer Reserve.
- 22289743 Sergeant Cyril John Spriggs, Corps of Royal Electrical and Mechanical Engineers.
- 22251570 Staff Sergeant Dennis Edwin Thomas, Royal Army Ordnance Corps, Territorial and Army Volunteer Reserve.
- 23698541 Staff Sergeant Peter Williams, Royal Tank Regiment.
- 23478008 Staff Sergeant Anthony Frederick Wilson, Royal Horse Artillery.

Royal Air Force

- Acting Warrant Officer Albert George Jones (V4020512).
- M0574329 Flight Sergeant George Henry Brigginshaw.
- Y1279691 Flight Sergeant Arthur Coggins.
- D4007821 Flight Sergeant Charles Edward Crowley.
- Cl920693 Flight Sergeant James Edgar Laybourne.
- E0553046 Flight Sergeant Chidley Howard Lyons.
- R4054690 Flight Sergeant Dennis McCann, Royal Air Force Regiment.
- U0576837 Flight Sergeant Dennis Charles Sturman.
- N0652249 Acting Flight Sergeant George Albert Nelson Gray.
- E1911453 Acting Flight Sergeant Thomas Marshall.
- L1928279 Chief Technician David Cairns.
- N0576294 Chief Technician Kenneth Lory Crowle.
- A0588025 Chief Technician Charles William Fox.
- H0586170 Chief Technician Alexander Mallen.
- S1924476 Chief Technician Keith Robert Moss.
- D4030434 Chief Technician Douglas Terence Oliver.
- M0589101 Chief Technician Malcolm Brian Thomas.
- H4160388 Chief Technician Clive Thompson.
- G0589410 Chief Technician Jeffrey Ward.
- W1926025 Chief Technician Christopher John Watts, for services with the Royal Malaysian Air Force.
- Q4079085 Chief Technician Brian Sidney Williams.
- E4166087 Sergeant Hugh Keenan Boyle, Royal Air Force Regiment.
- L4004273 Sergeant Stewart Cameron.
- C4126402 Sergeant John Michael Douglas Cope.
- R3516655 Sergeant William Douglas David Davies.
- T4108038 Sergeant Thomas Wilfred Dove.
- Y1904781 Sergeant Matthew Hannigan.
- C3148646 Sergeant Robert McColl.
- L4039847 Sergeant William Robert Martin.
- A4132313 Sergeant Robert Harold Maurer.
- Y352S009 Sergeant John Ernest Newman.
- N2S68161 Corporal Ronald Downie Ferguson.
- P1903984 Corporal Bernard James Francis Flood.
- W2350002 Corporal Cyril Friend.
- B2996151 Corporal Jennifer Mary James, Women's Royal Air Force.
- M4237201 Corporal Michael David Noble.

Civil Division

- Alan Airey, Sergeant, Suffolk Constabulary.
- Annie Allibone, Buffer, Viners Ltd., Sheffield.
- Sydney Alsop, lately Foreman, Chrysler (U.K.) Ltd., Coventry.
- Philip Andrewartha, Process Worker, Reactor Operations, British Nuclear Fuels Ltd., Windscale and Calder Works, United Kingdom Atomic Energy Authority.
- Archibald George Hanvood Ashton, Civilian Instructional Officer V, HMS Fisgard Torpoint, Ministry of Defence.
- John Ashton, Senior Technical Officer, British Egg Marketing Board.
- Elsie Doris Baker, Divisional Superintendent, Cadet Nursing Division, Preston, St. John Ambulance Association.
- George Daniel Stansworth Ball, House Foreman, British Broadcasting Corporation.
- Arthur Barker, Constable, Kingston-upon-Hull City Police.
- Cecil Walter Barreman, Boatswain, MV Regent Falcon, General Service Contracts.
- Emma Harriet Beresford, National Savings Street and Social Groups Collector, Biggin Hill, Kent.
- Maud Mary Biggs, Matron-Housekeeper, Police College, Basingstoke, Hampshire.
- Percy Hargreaves Booth, Weaver, Jeremiah Ambler Ltd., Bradford.
- Ernest Broughton, National Savings Village Group Collector, Walton-on-the-Hill, Stafford.
- Bernard Brown, Billet Crane Driver, Bromford Works, British Steel Corporation.
- Reginald Ernest Brown, Research and Development Craftsman, Chertsey, Ministry of Defence.
- Albert Edward Burger, Foreign and Commonwealth Office.
- John Burt, Museum Technician Grade I, Scottish Record Office.
- Albert Edward Bush, Coast Preventive Man, Board of Customs and Excise.
- Harold Charles Butcher, Head Messenger, Office of Admiral Superintendent, Portsmouth, Ministry of Defence.
- Herbert Samuel Buttery, Mess Steward I, RAF Bicester, Ministry of Defence.
- Reginald Cyril Card, Polishing Shop Foreman, C. Pearce & Sons, London S.W.2.
- Emily Irene Carter, Senior Leading Firewoman, London Fire Brigade.
- Maurice Ingram Chapman, Smallholder, Sutton Bridge Farm Settlements Estate, Lincolnshire.
- Robert Brooke Chapman, County Sergeant Major, Essex, St. John Ambulance Association.
- Basil Chisholm, Foreman, Consett Works, British Steel Corporation.
- Lilian Florence Cleave, Supervisor of Sorting Assistants, Department for National Savings.
- Cyril Guy Coates, Sergeant, Cumbria Constabulary.
- Gilbert Charles Cooke, lately Senior Messenger, Prime Minister's Office.
- Leonard Charles Corder, Senior Surgery Assistant, Britannia Royal Naval College, Dartmouth.
- William Frank Cottier, Coxswain, Ramsey Life-Boat, Royal National Lifeboat Institution.
- Michael Coughlan, Photoprinter Grade I, Ministry of Defence.
- Blanche Amy Coward, Cleaner, Metropolitan Police Office.
- Charles Arthur Crane, lately Chief Inspector, Eastern Counties Omnibus Co. Ltd., Norwich.
- Constance Muriel Cross, National Savings Street Groups Collector, Lancaster.
- Harold Leslie Dawe, Trawler Chief Engineer, Fleetwood, Lancashire.
- Florence Annie Dawson, Manageress, Navy, Army and Air Force Institutes, Junior Ranks Club, Tidworth.
- Ernest Edwin Charles Denyer, Process and General Supervisory Worker Grade V, Central Veterinary Laboratory, Weybridge, Ministry of Agriculture, Fisheries and Food.
- Daisy Dickinson, Joint Deputy Centre Organiser, Scunthorpe, Lincolnshire Women's Royal Voluntary Service.
- James Edward Dowd, Process Operator, Nobel Division, Imperial Chemical Industries, Powerfoot, Annan, Dumfriesshire.
- Frederick Charles Drane, Station Officer, Essex Fire Brigade.
- Douglas Dudhill, Hospital Chief Officer, Parkhurst Prison.
- Robert John Dudley, Chargehand Craftsman Grade I, Royal Aircraft Establishment, Farnborough.
- Herbert Stanley Dunn, Instructional Officer, Grade III, Letchworth Government Training Centre, Department of Employment.
- Alan Stanley Edridge, Chief Inspector, Kent County Constabulary.
- John Charles Enright, Chief Inspector, Head Post Office, Kingston upon Thames.
- Sidney Robert Fitsall, Outside Supervisor, Roberts Adlard Co. Ltd., Bromley, Kent.
- George Alfred Foster, Yard Foreman, British Road Services Ltd.
- Wilfred James Fountains, Leading Fireman, Liverpool Fire Brigade.
- Robert Mckenzie Fraser, Technical Grade III, Head Groundsman, Royal Naval Air Station, Arbroath, Ministry of Defence.
- L. Winifred Fuller, National Savings Street Group Collector, Portsmouth.
- Harold Frank William Fursey, Messenger, Ministry of Agriculture, Fisheries and Food.
- Irene Florence Gale, Section Leader, Government Car Service, Department of the Environment.
- Sidney Thomas Gardner, Senior Road Foreman, Northamptonshire County Council.
- John Edward Gawne, Coxswain, Port St. Mary Life-Boat, Royal National Lifeboat Institution.
- John Geddes, DFC, Chief Inspector, Metropolitan Police.
- Henry James Gibbs, Depot Manager, Robert Warner Ltd., Nuneaton, Warwickshire.
- Ajone Oriel Gleadow Gleadow, National Savings Street Group Collector, Portishead, Bristol.
- Charles Percy Goddard, Commandant, Surrey Special Constabulary.
- William John Going, Office Keeper, Grade III, Court of Protection, Supreme Court of Judicature.
- Martha Lemon Grant, Chief Supervisor (Telephones), Belfast Telephone Exchange.
- William George Gutteridge, Hospital Foreman, Royal Naval Hospital Haslar, Ministry of Defence.
- Walter Charles William Halliday, Head Porter, Odstock Hospital, Salisbury.
- George Hamilton, Assistant Engineer (Mechanical), Shotton Colliery, South Durham, National Coal Board.
- Peter Hamilton, Oncost Worker, Dalkeith Colliery, Scottish South Area, National Coal Board.
- Harold James Hancock, Boilerhouse Foreman, Meaford Power Station, Midlands Region, Central Electricity Generating Board.
- Willie Harper, Transmitter Technician, British Broadcasting Corporation.
- Elizabeth Harrison, lately Chargehand Rubber Worker, Dunlop Co. Ltd., Manchester.
- James Harrison, Colliery Fire Officer, Langwith Colliery, North Derbyshire, National Coal Board.
- John Campbell Harvey, Boatswain, MV Dunkwa, Ocean Fleets Ltd.
- John William Hawcock, Chief Observer, Long Eaton Group, Royal Observer Corps.
- Leslie Kenneth Hawkins, Chief Inspector, Metropolitan Police.
- Mary Heath. For services to children and young people in Bristol.
- Peter Heesom, Workshop Supervisor, Rediffusion (East Midlands) Ltd., Nottingham.
- John Henzell, Instructional Officer, Grade III, Felling Government Training Centre, Department of Employment.
- Patricia M. Hetherington. For services to the community in the Lake District.
- Charles Hickey, Donkeyman, MV Manapouri, New Zealand Shipping Co. Ltd.
- Joseph Hill, Local Supervisor of Fitters, HM Dockyard, Gibraltar.
- Sidney William James House, Travelling Head Cellarman, British Rail Catering Services.
- Michael Hughes, Custodian, Air Training Corps Mountain Training Hut, Bethesda, Caernarvonshire.
- Rhyse Cannon Humphreys, Foreman, Lehane Mackenzie & Shand, Civil Engineering Contractors, Nottingham.
- Arthur Goodman Jack, Storeman Grade B, Edinburgh Castle, Ministry of Defence.
- James John Jackson, lately Grade III Overseer, HM Stationery Office.
- Tom Maxwell Jeffs, Locomotive Driver, Movements Department, Eastern Region, British Railways Board.
- Kathleen John, Cook, Groeswen Hospital, Port Talbot.
- William Thomas Jolley, Aircraft Fitter, Samlesbury Aerodrome, British Aircraft Corporation Ltd.
- Arthur Jones, Youth Leader, Meynell Road Youth Club, Sheffield.
- Andrew Kane, Office Keeper Grade III, Ministry of Commerce for Northern Ireland.
- Henry Alfred Machal Kemp, Principal Doorkeeper, House of Lords.
- William Frederick Kindleysides, Departmental Manager, Boots Pure Drug Co. Ltd., Beeston, Nottingham.
- Herbert Knight, Skilled Crankshaft Grinder, British Leyland Motor Corporation Ltd., Coventry.
- Wilfred Henry Knight, Welder, Car Wheel Shop, Dunlop Co. Ltd. (U.K. Tyre Group), Birmingham.
- Harold James Lane, Transport Manager, Metropolitan Police Office.
- Stanley Alfred Larkin, lately Assistant Divisional Permanent Way Inspector, Southern Region, British Railways Board.
- Christopher Leggett, Area Foreman, First Class, Essex County Council.
- Stanley Victor Lentell, lately Messenger, Department of Health and Social Security.
- Leslie Thomas Linggard, General Foreman, British Museum (National History).
- Henry Long, Chief Inspector, Royal Ulster Constabulary.
- Hamilton Hugh Lorimer, Technical Officer Grade III, Department of the Environment.
- Ellen Mary Lyons, Woman Sergeant, Royal Ulster Constabulary.
- Frederick McGrath, Chargeman, National Carriers Ltd.
- John Mackechnie, Auxiliary Coastguard in Charge, Tobermory, Isle of Mull.
- William McLagan, Locomotive Driver, Polmadie Motive Power Depot, Glasgow, Scottish Region, British Railways Board.
- Myra McLellan, Quartermaster, Scottish Branch Headquarters, British Red Cross Society.
- Margaret McMurray, Housemother, Mountnorris Family Group Home, County Armagh.
- Edith Mary Marsh, Cook, Royal Ordnance Factory, Cardiff.
- James Sidney Marston. For services to the road haulage industry in Stockton-on-Tees.
- Samuel Maybury, Chargehand Examiner, Cranes and Lifting Tackle, British Rail Engineering Limited, Derby.
- Walter Adam Aitken Millar, Foreign and Commonwealth Office.
- William Stanley Millard, Plant Erector and Demonstrator, Masson Scott Thrissell Engineering Ltd, Bristol. For services to Export.
- Sidney Milnes, Works Technical Officer Grade III, Fire Research Station, Boreham Wood, Department of the Environment.
- Douglas William Morrison, Chargehand Linesman, South Eastern Electricity Board.
- Grace Moss, National Savings Industrial, School and Street Groups Collector, London Borough of Lambeth.
- Kathleen Mary Norris, Centre Organiser, Cuckfield Urban District, Women's Royal Voluntary Service.
- Isabella B. Ogilvie, Commandant, Cardonald Section, St. Andrew's Ambulance Corps.
- Eleanor Paget, Group Collector, Messrs. F. Dowler Ltd., Lisnaska, County Fermanagh.
- James Ronald Painter, Boiler Operator, Earley Power Station, South Western Region, Central Electricity Generating Board.
- Robert Parkes, Stores Supervisory Grade III, Aeroplane and Armament Experimental Establishment, Boscombe Down, Salisbury.
- Thomas Basil Parkinson, Foreman, Development Assembly Shop, Bristol Engine Division, Rolls-Royce Ltd.
- Thomas Henry Peart, Divisional Permanent Way Supervisor, South Western Division, Southern Region, British Railways Board.
- John Henry Priestley, Road Foreman Grade I, Nottinghamshire County Council.
- Vincent Evelyn Quattrucci, Inspector, Metropolitan Special Constabulary.
- David John Reay, Inspector Grade I, Civil Aviation Constabulary, Belfast Airport.
- Charles Rider, Head Chauffeur, The Gas Council.
- Kathleen Roberts, Detachment Quartermaster, Merionethshire Branch, British Red Cross Society.
- William McIntosh Robertson, Head Foreman, Thomas C. Keay Ltd., Dundee. For services to Export.
- Margarethe Vaughan Robson, Centre Organiser, Stowmarket, Suffolk, Women's Royal Voluntary Service.
- Rosalind Luceretta Ruddy, Seamstress, Gaynes Hall Borstal, Home Office.
- Derek John Saint, Sergeant, Metropolitan Police.
- William John Sambrook, Packer, Panteg Works, British Steel Corporation, Pontypool, Monmouthshire.
- Frank Scholes, Senior Foreman, Plant Maintenance, The Plessey Co. Ltd., Telecommunications Group, Beeston, Nottingham.
- Vera Mary Scott, lately Centre Organiser, Penrith, Women's Royal Voluntary Service.
- Joseph Shaw, Civilian Instructor, No. 1938 (2nd Salford Squadron), Air Training Corps.
- Cecil Frederick Sherrell, Examiner of Clothing, Metropolitan Police Office.
- Arthur Henry Short, Foreman Shipwright, Vosper Thornycroft Ltd., Portsmouth.
- William Arthur Siegal, Senior Housekeeper Messenger, Board of Customs and Excise.
- Frederick Simpson, Theatre Attendant, United Birmingham Hospitals.
- Sergeant Donald Smith, Leader, Mountain Rescue Team, Ross and Sutherland Constabulary.
- William Smithyman, Senior Supervisor, Penarth Road Pumping Station, Cardiff Corporation.
- James Goldie Somerville, Chief Inspector, Stirling and Clackmannan Police Force.
- Charles Miller Sorbie, No. 1 Operator, Imperial Chemical Industries High Pressure Steam Reforming Plant, Granton Gasworks, Scottish Gas Board.
- John Turner Southwell, Station Officer, Staffordshire Fire Brigade.
- Sophie Elizabeth Stanton, Superintendent of Cleaners, HM Treasury.
- Gilbert Victor Taplin, Ambulance Driver, Coventry County Borough Council.
- Terence Richard Tapp, Head Assistant, Investigation Division, Post Office Central Headquarters.
- Frederick Arthur Taylor, lately Bus Driver, West Midlands Passenger Transport Executive.
- George Charles Henry Taylor, Gasfitter, East Midlands Gas Board, Burton-upon-Trent.
- James Alexander Taylor, Motor Transport Driver, Royal Naval Air Station, Lossiemouth, Ministry of Defence.
- Joseph Ternent, Hydraulic Prop Repairer, Shilbottle Colliery, Northumberland Area, National Coal Board.
- Winifred Lucy Thomas. For voluntary services with the Folkestone Unit, Sea Cadet Corps.
- Florence Thorley, Woman Chief Inspector, Leeds City Police.
- Frederick Henry Tuck, Telephonist, Brompton Hospital, Frimley, Surrey.
- Arthur Turkentine, Supervisor, Cambridge Scientific Instruments Ltd. For services to Exports.
- John Vella, Grade "A" Clerk, Malta, Ministry of Defence.
- Victor Frederick Wadner, Production Manager, Electrics, British Aircraft Corporation Ltd., Bristol.
- George Henry Walcroft, Leading Hand, SS S.A. Oranje, British & Commonwealth Shipping Co. Ltd.
- Donald Robert Walker, Gas Fitter, Malton, North Eastern Gas Board.
- Tudor Thomas Walley, Foreign and Commonwealth Office.
- Doris Walton, Commandant, North Riding of Yorkshire Branch, British Red Cross Society.
- George Robert Watson, Senior Railman, Movements Department, Newcastle, Eastern Region, British Railways Board.
- Joseph Webster, Mains Foreman, Burnley District, North Western Electricity Board.
- David Hugh Wheatley, Voluntary Worker for the disabled.
- Sidney Thomas Wheddon, Mess Steward, Grade I, Ministry of Defence, Arborfield, Berkshire.
- James George Wheeler, Chargehand, G. N. Haden & Sons Ltd., London W.C.1.
- Evan Thomas Whittingham, Divisional Commandant, West Midlands Special Constabulary.
- Richard Charles Wiles, Sub-Officer, East Riding of Yorkshire Fire Brigade.
- Edward George Williams, Coxswain, Ilfracombe Life-Boat, Royal National Lifeboat Institution.
- James Williams, Foreman, Guided Weapons Division, British Aircraft Corporation, Bristol.
- Mary Harris Williams, Supervisor Telephones, Wales and the Marches Telecommunications Board, Post Office.
- Reginald James Williams, lately Farm Foreman, Monmouth College of Agriculture, Usk.
- Sarah Josephine Williams, Reproduction Grade BIV, Ordnance Survey.
- Frederick George Wills, Museum Technician Grade I, Department of the Environment.
- William D. Wilson, Head, HM Coastguard Rescue Company, St. Abbs, Berwickshire.
- William McWilliams Wilson, lately Turner, Wilson Pipe Fittings Ltd., Irvine, Ayrshire.
- Dorothy Ethel Woodward, Assistant Chief Photoprinter, National Physical Laboratory, Teddington.
- Violetta Wordsworth, Glassware Cleaner, Public Health Laboratory, Middlesbrough.
- Sydney Wray, lately Shear Operator, Appleby-Frodingham Works, British Steel Corporation.
- Anne Yeo. For services to National Savings and the Women's Royal Voluntary Service in the Penybont Rural District, Glamorganshire.

Overseas Territories

- Bua Alea, Deck Officer, Marine Department, British Solomon Islands Protectorate.
- John Emmanuel Arnold, Works Overseer, Public Works Department, British Honduras.
- Henry Bruce Dixon (Brother Chanel). For services to the development of engineering in the British Solomon Islands Protectorate.
- Fook-cheung Fan, Calligraphist, Government Information Services, Hong Kong.
- Manuel Ghio, Chief Clerk, Gibraltar City Fire Brigade.
- Pennell Oliver Legg, Agricultural Supervisor, St. Helena.
- Philip Nathaniel Samuels, Senior Machinist, Printing Department, British Honduras.
- Clement Springer, Corporal, Royal St. Lucia Police Force. For services to music.
- Chee-kuen Tong, Officer-in-Charge, Kowloon Demonstration Team, Civil Aid Services, Hong Kong.
- Royal Douglas Watler, lately Deputy Collector of Customs, Cayman Islands.

Australian States
State of New South Wales

- Councillor Wilfred Barrett. For service to local government in Wyong Shire.
- Gordon William Black. For service to the State.
- Alice Mary Cliffe. For service to the community.
- Eily Annie Fry. For service to the community in the Newcastle and Hunter Valley districts.
- Edna Alice Harris. For service to the community in Cassnock.
- Joan Rosemary Hill. For service to the community in the Eastern suburbs of Sydney.
- John Stanley Hurn. For service to music and to the community in Newcastle.
- Rose Hannah McIver. For service to the community in Randwick and Coogee.
- Donald Sterling Macleod. For service to the State.
- Isobel May Reilly. For welfare service.
- Alderman Alice Matilda Robinson. For service to the community in Glen Innes.
- Charles Thomas Croswaite Sanger. For service to local government.
- Councillor Norman James Saville. For service to local government in Rylstone.
- Bruce Vere Secombe. For service to the community in Moree.
- Alderman William Robertson Tate. For service to local government.
- Nada Taylor. For charitable activities.
- Arthur Ernest White. For service to the community.
- Councillor Elson Verco Whyte. For service to local government in Wentworth.

State of Victoria

- Myrtle Phoebe Anset. For charitable activities in Dingee.
- Edward Henry Blackney. For services to ex-servicemen in Geelong.
- Frederick George Robotham Clayton. For public services in Canterbury.
- Eulalie Cooper. For services to ex-servicemen in Elsternwick.
- Ena Florence Domec-Carre. For services to physical education in South Yarra.
- Percival Gustav Claude Einsiedel. For services to the community in Kooweerup.
- Gladys Evelyn Isobel Garvin. For services to ex-servicemen in Macleod.
- Mary Isabelle Gilbert. For services to education in Orbost.
- Leonard William Keating. For services to racing in Dandenong.
- Thelma Elizabeth Kiely. For social welfare services in Brunswick.
- Tom Horatio Kinrade. For services to the Corps of Commissionaires in Heathmont.
- Neville John McMartin. For services to the Civil Defence Organisation in the Shire of Euroa.
- Irene Robins. For services to the Scouting Movement in East Melbourne.
- Kathleen Mary Schultz. For services to the community in Sale.
- Gordon William Starke. For services to the Corps of Commissionaires in Toorak.
- Violet Symmons. For services to the Australian Red Cross Society in Lakes Entrance.
- William James Taylor. For services to the Commando Association in Canterbury.

=== Royal Red Cross (RRC) ===
- Margaret Amelia Webb Paterson, ARRC. Principal Matron (Tutor), Queen Alexandra's Royal Naval Nursing Service.
- Colonel Emma Hewie Litherland, ARRC, (213769), Queen Alexandra's Royal Army Nursing Corps.

==== Associate of the Royal Red Cross (ARRC) ====
- Jean Margaret Clarke, Superintending Sister, (Tutor), Queen Alexandra's Royal Naval Nursing Service.
- Lieutenant-Colonel Kathleen Elizabeth Cawthorn, TD, (218215), Queen Alexandra's Royal Army Nursing Corps, Territorial and Army Volunteer Reserve.
- Major Patricia Mary Molloy (451735), Queen Alexandra's Royal Army Nursing Corps.
- Major Rosaleen Teresa Nicholson (450872), Queen Alexandra's Royal Army Nursing Corps.
- Major Brenda Smith (460224), Queen Alexandra's Royal Army Nursing Corps.
- Squadron Officer Muriel Kathleen Dunn (406998), Princess Mary's Royal Air Force Nursing Service.

=== Air Force Cross (AFC) ===
Royal Navy

- Commander Lawrence George Locke.
- Lieutenant Commander John Hedges.

Royal Air Force

- Wing Commander Raymond John Offord (584427).
- Acting Wing Commander John Alan Robinson (607296).
- Squadron Leader Reginald Douglas Brown (552846).
- Squadron Leader Dennis George Hazell (4072330).
- Squadron Leader Malcolm Ashley McNeile (58982).
- Squadron Leader Arnold Walter Parr (2551610).
- Squadron Leader Crawford Alexander Simpson (2435586).
- Flight Lieutenant David Reginald Ashover (583998).
- Flight Lieutenant David Clem Longden (608372).
- Flight Lieutenant Richard Bryan Olive (4033515).
- Flight Lieutenant Peter Richard Wild (586456).

=== Air Force Medal (AFM) ===
- J4008293 Sergeant Paul Keane, Royal Air Force.

=== Queen's Police Medal (QPM) ===
England and Wales

- Rex Stanley Fletcher, Chief Constable, Nottinghamshire Combined Constabulary.
- Arthur George Puckering, Chief Constable, Durham Constabulary.
- Gerald Henry Baumber, Deputy Chief Constable, West Midlands Constabulary.
- Charles James Page, Assistant Commissioner, City of London Police.
- Kenneth Frank Alston, Deputy Chief Constable, Essex and Southend-on-Sea Joint Constabulary.
- Wallace Harold Virgo, Commander, Metropolitan Police.
- Mungo Gillespie, Commander, Metropolitan Police.
- Robin Hartnell Fowler, Commander, Metropolitan Police.
- Robert Huntley, BEM, Commander, Metropolitan Police.
- James Anderson Marshall, Assistant Chief Constable, Northumberland Constabulary.
- William Bowler, Assistant Chief Constable, Sheffield and Rotherham Constabulary.
- Donald Craig, Chief Superintendent, West Yorkshire Constabulary.
- William Hywel Davies, Chief Superintendent, Liverpool and Bootle Constabulary.
- Leslie Gordon Strong, BEM, Chief Superintendent, Thames Valley Constabulary.
- Harold Sherwood, Chief Superintendent, Dyfed-Powys Constabulary.

Scotland

- Robert Fraser Murison, Chief Constable, Fife Constabulary.
- Ian McGillivray, Assistant Chief Constable and Deputy Chief Constable, Ayrshire Constabulary.

Northern Ireland

- James Herbert Seay, Superintendent, Royal Ulster Constabulary.

Australian States

State of New South Wales

- Roy Milton Lane, Superintendent, 2nd Class, New South Wales Police Force.
- Richard Edward Lendrum, Detective Superintendent, 2nd Class, New South Wales Police Force.
- Vernal Arthur Coggan, Superintendent, 3rd Class, New South Wales Police Force.
- Henry Michael Griffin, Superintendent, 3rd Class, New South Wales Police Force.
- Calvert Chandos Wells, lately Superintendent, 3rd Class, New South Wales Police Force.
- Leonard Roslyn Norton, lately Detective Superintendent, 3rd Class, New South Wales Police Force.

State of Victoria

- Angus Lindsay Carmichael, Assistant Commissioner, Victoria Police Force.
- Victor Thomas Sheather, Superintendent, Grade I, Victoria Police Force.
- Keith McTier McLeod, Superintendent, Grade II, Victoria Police Force.
- Alan Charles Stuart Robinson, Superintendent, Grade II, Victoria Police Force.
- John O'Connor, Chief Inspector, Victoria Police Force.
- Cornelius John Crowe, Inspector, Grade I, Victoria Police Force.

State of South Australia

- Ernest Aston, Inspector, 1st Class, South Australia Police Force.
- Harold Angas Storch, Inspector, 2nd Class, South Australia Police Force.

State of Tasmania

- Gordon Carl Hamilton Higgs, Superintendent, Tasmania Police Force.
- Vera Margaret Webberley, Policewoman Sergeant, Tasmania Police Force.

Overseas Territories

- Samuel Arthur Josiah Adolphus, BEM, Commissioner, British Honduras Police Force.
- Henry Hector Bisset, Chief of Police, Royal Montserrat Police Force.
- Edmond Paul Grace, Assistant Commissioner, Royal Hong Kong Police Force.
- Charles Terence Miller, Assistant Commissioner, Royal Brunei Police Force.
- Alexander Johannes Schouten, Assistant Commissioner, Royal Hong Kong Police Force.

=== Queen's Fire Services Medal (QFSM) ===
England and Wales

- William Moss, Assistant Chief Officer (Deputy Chief Officer), East Sussex Fire Brigade.
- Stephen George Keely, Chief Officer, Wolverhampton Fire Brigade.
- William Arthur Spouge, Chief Officer, Lincolnshire (Parts of Lindsey) Fire Brigade.
- Edward Fritz Charles Nichols, Divisional Officer, Grade I, Gloucestershire Fire Brigade.

Scotland

- John Craig Donnachie, Firemaster, North-Eastern Area Fire Brigade.

Australian States

State of New South Wales

- Victor James Crum, Superintendent, New South Wales Fire Brigade.
- Noel Henry Meads, Superintendent, New South Wales Fire Brigade.
- Noel Alfred Hamey, Brigade Captain, New South Wales Fire Brigade.
- John James Owers, Brigade Captain, New South Wales Fire Brigade.
- Walter Newby Wright, Volunteer Fireman, New South Wales Fire Brigade.

=== Colonial Police Medal (CPM) ===
Overseas Territories

- James Reginald Ashby, Superintendent, Royal Hong Kong Police Force.
- Hugh Elridge Bertram Blackman, Inspector, Royal St. Lucia Police Force.
- Donald Joseph Bryan, Superintendent, Royal Hong Kong Police Force.
- Cheng Wai-chi, Senior Divisional Officer, Hong Kong Fire Services.
- Chiu Kwong-yung, Assistant Superintendent, Royal Hong Kong Auxiliary Police Force.
- Chow Sai-cheun, Divisional Officer, Hong Kong Auxiliary Fire Service.
- Wright Fitz-Henley George, Assistant Superintendent, Royal Antigua Police Force.
- Hau King-to, Senior Inspector, Royal Hong Kong Police Force.
- Eric Headley, Assistant Superintendent, Royal St. Lucia Police Force.
- Heun Chi-hung, Sergeant, Royal Hong Kong Police Force.
- Joseph Patrick MacMahon, Superintendent, Royal Hong Kong Police Force.
- Sydney Minus, Superintendent, Royal Bahamas Police Force.
- Mo Muk, Principal Fireman, Hong Kong Fire Services.
- Ormond Frederick Reece, Inspector, Royal St. Lucia Police Force.
- Sa Hin-li, Assistant Superintendent, Royal Hong Kong Auxiliary Police Force.
- Tom Schofield, Senior Inspector, Royal Hong Kong Auxiliary Police Force.
- Louis Chan Sew, Senior Inspector, Royal Hong Kong Police Force.
- Cecil Shields, Superintendent, Royal Hong Kong Police Force.
- Howard Viscount Sweeting, Inspector, Royal Bahamas Police Force.
- Yeap Kwok-hung, Senior Divisional Officer, Hong Kong Fire Services.

=== Queen's Commendation for Valuable Service in the Air ===
Royal Air Force

- Squadron Leader Kenneth Bruce Latton (608190).
- Squadron Leader Peter Michael Riley (608052).
- Acting Squadron Leader Arthur Duncan Austin Cooke (4231213).
- Acting Squadron Leader Michael Alan Pringle (3512121).
- Flight Lieutenant Brian George Bultitude (2238033).
- Flight Lieutenant Malcolm John Innis Carr (3517668).
- Flight Lieutenant Peter Charles Clarke (578804).
- Flight Lieutenant Donald Frederick Gardner (579038).
- Flight Lieutenant Eric William Hopkins (2515164), (Retired).
- Flight Lieutenant David Turner Parfitt (3054074).
- Flight Lieutenant Russell Pengelly (608519).
- Flight Lieutenant John Martin Preece (2743499), for services with the Royal Malaysian Air Force.
- Flight Lieutenant George Richard Profit (4231082).
- Flight Lieutenant John Noel Simmons (3504784).
- Flight Lieutenant Alan Peter William Tait (5200025).
- Flight Lieutenant William David Seed Waddington (4230458), Royal Air Force Reserve of Officers.
- Flight Lieutenant John Dennis Townshend Wingfield (607966).
- Master Air Electronics Operator Geoffrey Graeme Bevis (H4048593).
- Master Air Electronics Operator Michael Muttitt (R4105153).
- Master Engineer William Gault McMurtry (J3504722).

United Kingdom

- John Goodwin Burns, Deputy Chief Test Pilot, Hawker Siddeley Aviation Ltd., Brough, East Yorkshire.
- David Alan Creamer, Helicopter Captain, British European Airways Helicopters Ltd.
- John Alan Johnson, Captain, Britannia Airways.
- Harold Roy Radford, Assistant Chief Test Pilot, British Aircraft Corporation Ltd., Weybridge, Surrey.
- Stanley George Websper, Manager, Technical Services, Caledonian British United Airways.
- Neil Meredith Williams, Test Pilot—Acrobatic Pilot.

== Australia ==
=== Knight Bachelor ===
- John Buchan, CMG, of South Yarra, Victoria. For distinguished services to international relations.
- Mr. Justice Richard Moulton Eggleston, of Toorak, Victoria. For distinguished services to law.
- Vincent Charles Fairfax, CMG, of Double Bay, New South Wales. For distinguished services to youth, finance and the press.
- Alderman James Campbell Irwin, OBE, ED, of North Adelaide, South Australia. For distinguished services to Government and the community.
- John Laurence Knott, CBE, of Kew, Victoria. For distinguished public service.
- Reginald Charles Reed, CBE, of Killara, New South Wales. For distinguished services to the shipbuilding industry.
- Kenneth William Starr, CMG, OBE, ED, MS, FRACS, of Coogee, New South Wales, Medical Director, New South Wales State Cancer Council. For distinguished services to medicine and Government.
- Professor Sydney Sunderland, CMG, MD, FRACP, Dean, Faculty of Medicine, University of Melbourne. For distinguished services to medicine and Government.

=== Order of the Bath ===
==== Companion of the Order of the Bath (CB) ====
Military Division

- Air Vice-Marshal William Edwin Townsend, CBE, (0358), Royal Australian Air Force, Air Officer Commanding Operational Command.

=== Order of Saint Michael and Saint George ===
==== Companion of the Order of St Michael and St George (CMG) ====
- Sidney Jack Fenn Hocking, of Perth, Western Australia. For services to journalism and the newspaper industry.
- John Thyne Reid, of Kew, Victoria. For services to industry and government.

=== Order of the British Empire ===
==== Dame Commander of the Order of the British Empire (DBE) ====
Civil Division

- Lady Mary Terese Cramer, of Wollstonecraft, New South Wales. For distinguished public services.

==== Knight Commander of the Order of the British Empire (KBE) ====
Civil Division

- The Right Honourable Charles Frederick Adermann, MP, of Kingaroy, Queensland. For long and distinguished political and public services.

==== Commander of the Order of the British Empire (CBE) ====
Military Division

- Rear Admiral Bryan James Castles, Royal Australian Navy, Third Naval Member and Chief of Naval Technical Services.
- Brigadier Peter Lumsden Tancred, OBE, (282), Australian Staff Corps.
- Air Commodore Douglas David Hurditch (021976), Royal Australian Air Force.

Civil Division

- Professor James Johnston Auchmuty, of Newcastle, New South Wales. For services to education and international relations.
- Robin Gerard Penleigh Boyd, of South Yarra, Victoria. For services to architecture and Government.
- John David Jess, MP, of Toorak, Victoria. For political and public services.
- Gordon Albert Jockel, OBE, Australian Ambassador to Indonesia.
- Philip Ernest Lucock, MP, Deputy Speaker and Chairman of Committees, House of Representatives.
- The Honourable Justice Miss Roma Flinders Mitchell, QC, of Adelaide, South Australia. For services to law.
- John Hackman Sumner, of Albert Park, Victoria. For services to the performing arts.
- Matthias Toliman, MHA, Ministerial Member for Education, Papua and New Guinea House of Assembly. For political and community services.
- David Ronald Zeidler, of Canterbury, Victoria. For services to industry, science and education.

==== Officer of the Order of the British Empire (OBE) ====
Military Division

Royal Australian Navy

- Surgeon Captain Graeme Lindsay Grove, VRD.
- Captain James William McClure.

Royal Australian Military Forces

- Lieutenant Colonel Stanley Leslie Devlin (237586), Royal Australian Army Ordnance Corps.
- Colonel David Frederick Walter Engel (2498), Australian Staff Corps.
- Lieutenant Colonel James Finlay Patrick, ED, (373448), Royal Australian Infantry Corps.

Royal Australian Air Force

- Group Captain Geoffrey Gordon Michael, AFC, (05842).
- Wing Commander Geoffrey Carlyle Nelson (018487).

Civil Division

- John Henry Antill, of Hunters Hill, New South Wales. For services to music.
- Harold Warnock Cottee, of Strathfield, New South Wales. For services to industry and the community.
- Duncan Robert Steele Craik, of Griffith, Australian Capital Territory. For public service.
- Emeritus Professor Raymond Maxwell Crawford, of Ivanhoe, Victoria. For services to education.
- Frank Fletcher Espie, of South Yarra, Victoria. For services to the Mining Industry.
- Gerald Falk, JP, of Dover Heights, New South Wales. For services to the community.
- Ethel Florence Gilham (Sister Mary Camillus), of Port Moresby, Territory of Papua and New Guinea. For services to the community.
- Anthony George Worsley Greatorex, MC, JP, President, Northern Territory Legislative Council. For services to Government and the community.
- Walter Stuart Francis Hamilton, of Rose Bay, New South Wales. For public service.
- Alderman William Harrison, of Ryde, New South Wales, For services to local government.
- Colin Powell Haselgrove, of Seacliffe, South Australia. For services to the wine industry.
- Sali Herman, of Avalon Beach, New South Wales. For services to art.
- Reginald Byron Leonard, of St. Lucia, Queensland. For services to journalism.
- Robert William Ludovic Lindsay, of Frankston, Victoria. For services to politics and the community.
- Philip Albert McBride, of Kingston, S.E., South Australia. For services to the wool industry.
- Hector James McIvor, JP, MP, of Footscray Victoria. For political services.
- Francis Stanislaus Maker, MBE, of Eastlakes, New South Wales. For services to ex-servicemen and women.
- George Molnar, of Darling Point, New South Wales. For services to journalism and architecture.
- William John O'Reilly, Second Commissioner of Taxation.
- James Angus Minshul Stockdale, of Lismore, New South Wales. For services to the dairying industry.
- Philip Stokes, ED, of Essendon West, Victoria. For services to politics and to ex-servicemen.
- Alfred William Tyree, of Darling Point, New South Wales. For philanthropic services.
- Dorothy May Willis, of Kew, Victoria. For services to international relations.
- Terence Cecil Winter, Commissioner, Commonwealth Conciliation and Arbitration Commission.
- Macdonnell Watkyn Woods, Director, Weapons Research Establishment, Department of Supply.
- Bruce Arundell Wright, of Armidale, New South Wales. For services to the wool industry.

==== Member of the Order of the British Empire (MBE) ====
Military Division

Royal Australian Navy

- Lieutenant Commander Desmond George Mooney.
- Lieutenant Commander Leslie Naylor.

Royal Australian Military Forces

- Warrant Officer Class One Allister John Bowie (2904), Royal Australian Armoured Corps.
- Major James Copeman, MC, MM, (2905043), Royal Australian Infantry Corps.
- Warrant Officer Class Two (now Warrant Officer Class One) John Creamer (310742), Royal Australian Army Service Corps.
- Major Sydney John Gardner, ED, (129307), Royal Australian Infantry Corps.
- Major Edward Karl Hales (6905004), Royal Australian Infantry Corps.
- Warrant Officer Class Two Colin Archibald Kenwood (4180), Royal Australian Infantry Corps.
- Captain (Temporary Major) William Kelly, ED, (859269), Royal Australian Infantry Corps.
- Warrant Officer Class Two William Desmond Kennedy, MM, (13116), Royal Australian Infantry Corps.
- Captain Diana Joan Lobb (F21992), Women's Royal Australian Army Corps.
- Major Frank McAskill (58017), Royal Australian Artillery.
- Warrant Officer Class Two Arthur Edward Weaven (28242), Royal Australian Infantry Corps.

Royal Australian Air Force

- Flight Lieutenant Nicholas O'Donnell Barry (03499).
- Flight Lieutenant Richard Joseph Cowman (034274).
- Squadron Leader John Alan Grey (05480).
- Warrant Officer Donald McKenzie (A32998).

Civil Division

- The Reverend Douglas Leonard Belcher, of Mornington Island, Northern Territory. For services to the Aboriginal community.
- Eric Ernest Bond, of East Lindfield, New South Wales. For public service.
- Sydney James Bowie, formerly Superintendent, Northern Territory Police Force.
- Kenneth John Robert Bromley, of Burleigh Heads, Queensland. For services to servicemen.
- Gordon Albert Bruderlin, of Tamworth, New South Wales. For services to the community.
- Barbara Burton, of Forrest, Australian Capital Territory. For services to education.
- Lyle Jack Byrne, of Caulfield, Victoria. For services to aviation.
- Frederick Joseph Cahill, of St. Ives, New South Wales. For services to ex-servicemen.
- Norman Maxwell Chase, Principal Contracts Officer, Australia House, London.
- Mona Cynthia Coles, of Longreach, Queensland. For services to the community.
- Grace Irene Cousins, JP, of Muswellbrook, New South Wales. For services to local government.
- Thomas Edward Doe, of New Town, Tasmania. For services to the community.
- Vernon Howard Dyason, of Port Augusta, South Australia, Controller of Stores, Commonwealth Railways.
- Michael Christopher Edgley, of Dalkeith, Western Australia. For services to the performing arts.
- Henry William Gray, of Alstonville, New South Wales. For services to primary industry.
- Betty Greenwood, of Braddon, Australian Capital Territory. For public service.
- Mona Ham, of Utrecht, Holland. For services to the Cancer Patients Assistance Society, New South Wales.
- Brett Hilder, of Castlecrag, New South Wales. For services to navigation.
- Leila Rose Hudson, of Killara, New South Wales. For services to the community.
- Ruby May Hyde, of Mitchell Park, South Australia. For services to the Aboriginal community.
- Valerie Kentish, Assistant Private Secretary to the Prime Minister.
- Maris Estelle King, Principal Research Officer, Department of Foreign Affairs, Canberra.
- Annett Luckie, of Burwood, New South Wales. For services to the community.
- Allan Arthur McArdle, of New Delhi, India. For services to international relations.
- John Allen McGree, MB, BS, Commonwealth Medical Officer, Gladstone, Queensland.
- Phyllis Mander-Jones. For services to Australian history.
- Roy Marika, of Yirrkala, Northern Territory. For services to the Aboriginal community.
- Richard Graham Meale, of North Adelaide, South Australia. For services to music.
- Sally Morris, of Bondi, New South Wales. For services to the community and international relations.
- John Grahame Mowbray, formerly Regional Superintendent of Airports, Queensland Region, Department of Civil Aviation.
- Emily Margaret Murden, of Haberfield, New South Wales. For services to local government.
- Brother John Anthony O'Connor, of Charters Towers, Queensland. For services to education.
- Ronald Harold Osbourne, Superintendent, Royal Australian Mint, Canberra.
- Norman Oates Pacey, of Epping, New South Wales. For services to the community.
- Ambrose Harold Palmer, of Footscray, Victoria. For services to sport.
- Percival Alan Pavey, of Oakleigh, Victoria. For services to sport.
- Vivian Woodward Peterson, of Cronulla, New South Wales. For services to the community.
- Keith Edward Rigg, of South Yarra, Victoria. For services to industry and sport.
- John William Robson, Deputy Commissioner, Repatriation Department.
- Robert Norman Saunders Rodgers, of Newcastle, New South Wales. For services to the community.
- Kenneth Robert Rosewall, of Turramufra, New South Wales. For services to sport.
- Delia Rutter, of Mitchell Park, South Australia. For services to the Aboriginal community.
- Reginald Walter Saunders, Liaison Officer, Office of Aboriginal Affairs.
- Eric de Lisle Thomas, DSO, ED, of Maroubra, New, South Wales. Superintendent, Commonwealth Hostels Limited. For services to migrants.
- Soa Ubia, of Uasilav Village, Territory of Papua and New Guinea, West New Britain District. For services to local government.
- John Graham Weir, JP, of Kurnell, New South Wales. For services to the community.
- Howell Charles Williams, of Middle Brighton, Victoria. Assistant Director-General, Department of Works, Melbourne.
- Victor John Williamson, of Brewarrina, New South Wales. President, Brewarrina Shire Council. For services to local government.
- Francis Blakey Yeats, of Ermington, New South Wales. For services to the blind.
- Yirawala, of Darwin, Northern Territory. For services to Aboriginal art.

=== Companion of the Imperial Service Order (ISO) ===
- James Canny, Deputy Commissioner of Taxation, Commonwealth Office of Taxation, Melbourne.
- George Rimmer Lewis, of Middle Cove, New South Wales. Formerly Assistant Director, Engineering Division, Postmaster-General's Department.
- Leslie Nicol Thornton, Chief Veterinary Officer, Department of Primary Industry, Canberra.

=== British Empire Medal (BEM) ===
Military Division

Royal Australian Navy

- Chief Engineroom Artificer Peter Edward Binns (R52529).
- Chief Petty Officer Frederick Donald Hudson (B40072), Royal Australian Naval Volunteer Reserve.
- Petty Officer Musician Athole Ernest Mitchell (A100750), Royal Australian Naval Reserve.
- Chief W.R.A.N. Radio Supervisor Nerida Marilyn Sullivan (W85177).

Royal Australian Military Forces

- Sergeant Allen Awibabara (8507), Australian Army Catering Corps.
- Sergeant (now Warrant Officer Class Two) Ronald Donaldson (16149), Royal Australian Armoured Corps.
- Staff Sergeant Robert James Green (258305), Royal Australian Infantry Corps.
- Sergeant Maxwilliam Martin (13627), Royal Australian Infantry Corps.
- Sergeant Jack Thomas Neilson (22446), Royal Australian Army Service Corps.
- Sergeant Robert James Tasker (2267614), Royal Australian Infantry Corps.
- Sergeant Judith Anne Wallace (F18241), Royal Australian Army Nursing Corps.
- Corporal Phillip Harry Wilson (28832), Royal Australian Army Medical Corps.

Royal Australian Air Force

- Flight Sergeant Colin Belcher (A19020).
- Flight Sergeant John Thomas Jarrott (33949).
- Flight Sergeant Andrew John Marshall (A217780).
- Flight Sergeant Elton John Reid (A314690).
- Sergeant Noel James Snow (A14817).

Civil Division

- Frederick Gordon Bate, of Dromana, Victoria. Formerly Motor Driver, Postmaster-General's Department.
- Lovell Mears Boxsell, JP, of Lane Cove, New South Wales. For services to ex-servicemen and women.
- Constance Maria Bryce, of Armadale, Victoria. For services to the community.
- Janet Elsie Chadwick, of Cronulla, New South Wales. For services to the community.
- Ivan Ainsworth Coombs, Clerical Assistant, Department of Civil Aviation.
- Effie Phyllis Cottrill, of Joondanna, Western Australia. For services to ex-servicemen and women.
- Rosalie Craig, Laundress, Darwin Hospital.
- Lionel Moyle Davies, JP, of Yarralumla, Australian Capital Territory. For services to the community as Superintendent, St. John Ambulance Brigade.
- Albert Caleb Doust, of North Ryde, New South Wales. For public service.
- Allan Downes, Senior Inspecting Officer, Department of the Navy.
- Dorothy Mary Downing, of Eastwood, New South Wales. For services to the community.
- Charles Henry Eccles, JP, of Willoughby, New South Wales. For services to ex-servicemen and women.
- Sarah May Elson of Scone, New South Wales. For services to the community.
- Norma Winifred Ewin, of Ashfield, New South Wales. For services to scouting and the community.
- Nora Mary Feely, Accounting Machinist-in-Charge, Department of Works, Darwin, Northern Territory.
- Eric George Field, of Highett, Victoria. Formerly Properties Officer, Postmaster-General's Department.
- George Edward Fleming, of South Townsville, Queensland. For services to the community.
- Howard Lyons Gattenhof, Senior Technical Officer, Department of Works, Darwin, Northern Territory.
- Leslie Benjamin Graham, Senior Clerical Assistant, Commonwealth Scientific and Industrial Research Organisation.
- Mary Greenwell, of Ascot Vale, Victoria. For services to migrants.
- Betty Hancock, of Blakehurst, New South Wales. For services to the community.
- Arthur Japez Harvey, Senior Radiographer, Repatriation General Hospital, Daw Park, South Australia.
- Thomas Gregory Haskard, of Crystal Brook, South Australia. For services to scouting.
- Rose Houghton, of Randwick, New South Wales. For services to the community, especially to the Colostomy Rehabilitation Association.
- Florence Harriet Jukes-Heley, of Eden Hills, South Australia. For public service.
- Libali Kalom, Head Orderly, Kerowagi Hospital, Chimbu District, Territory of Papua and New Guinea.
- Cecil Charles Kent, formerly Clerk, Department of the Treasury, Canberra.
- Robert Charles Kimsey, Acting Maintenance Supervisor, Australia House, London.
- Annie Catherine Lack, Postmistress, of Barringun, New South Wales.
- Thomas Laidler, of Glandore, South Australia. For public service and services to the community.
- Richard Thomas Latham, of Clovelly, New South Wales. For services to the community.
- Daniel William McCormack, Lineman, Postmaster-General's Department, Adelaide, South Australia.
- Catherine Isobel McCowan, Postmistress, Bolivia, New South Wales.
- Lionel Joseph McFarland, Sergeant, Northern Territory Police Force.
- James Bremner Martyr, JP, of Muswellbrook, New South Wales. For services to ex-servicemen and women.
- James Moreland, of Reservoir, Victoria. For services to ex-servicemen and women.
- Rita Elsie O'Shea, Steno-Secretary to the Auditor-General.
- Merele Mary Partridge, of Cronulla, New South Wales. For services to the community.
- Amy Pentland, Laundress, Tennant Creek Hospital, Northern Territory.
- Norman John Campbell Pickering, Senior Stores Supervisor, Department of the Army.
- Robert Gerald Power, of New Lambton, New South Wales. For public service.
- Lancelot Bursnell Reed, JP, of Hurstville, New South Wales. For services to ex-servicemen and women.
- Ronald James Reynolds, Administrative Officer, Telecommunications Division, Postmaster-General's Department, Sydney, New South Wales.
- Gordon Wilson Scott, of Burwood, New South Wales. For services to ex-servicemen and seamen.
- Clarence Edwin Sharman, Inspecting Officer, Department of the Army.
- Elizabeth Hannah Southern, Clerk, Australian War Memorial, Department of the Interior.
- Dorothy Rose Stephens, of Ryde, New South Wales. For services to the community.
- Tainabango, Sergeant First Class, Royal Papua and New Guinea Constabulary, East Sepik District, Territory of Papua and New Guinea.
- Violet Turner, of Teralba, New South Wales. For services to the community.
- Patricia Wale, Steno-Secretary to the Secretary, Attorney-General's Department, Canberra.
- Weho, Sergeant First Class, Royal Papua and New Guinea Constabulary, Port Moresby, Territory of Papua and New Guinea.
- James Patrick Williamson, Senior Technical Officer, Small Arms Factory, Department of Supply.

=== Air Force Cross (AFC) ===
Royal Australian Air Force

- Flight Lieutenant John Noel Gordon Bellamy (034245).
- Flight Lieutenant Frank John Daniel (037560).
- Squadron Leader Reginald James Turk (021531).

=== Queen's Police Medal (QPM) ===
- William Michael Burns, Divisional Superintendent, Royal Papua and New Guinea Constabulary, Islands Division, Rabaul, Territory of Papua and New Guinea.

=== Queen's Commendation for Valuable Service in the Air ===
Royal Australian Air Force

- Squadron Leader Bernard Francis Morton (025983).
- Squadron Leader Anthony Michael Parer (014751).
- Squadron Leader Noel Reidy (033634).
- Flight Lieutenant Desmond John Walters (0216120).

== Mauritius ==
=== Order of the British Empire ===
==== Commander of the Order of the British Empire (CBE) ====
Civil Division

- George Bernard McCaffery, QPM, Security Adviser, Mauritius Police Force. For loyal and outstanding service.
- Jean Henry Ythier, Mayor of the Municipality of Beau Bassin Rose Hill. For political and public services.

==== Officer of the Order of the British Empire (OBE) ====
Civil Division

- Tayabe Moos, lately Deputy Public Assistance Commissioner.

==== Member of the Order of the British Empire (MBE) ====
Civil Division

- Chandersendsing Bhagirutty. For services to rural local government and the trade union movement.
- Seetaram Narain, lately Inspector of Schools. For long and meritorious service.
- Nioza Yvette Walter, Councillor, Municipality of Curepipe. For services to the community and urban local government.
- Joseph Maxime Peroumal. For services in the field of catering.

== Fiji ==
=== Order of the British Empire ===
==== Officer of the Order of the British Empire (OBE) ====
Civil Division

- Rusiate Nayacakalou, Manager of the Native Lands Trust Board.

==== Member of the Order of the British Empire (MBE) ====
Military Division

- Warrant Officer Class 1 Regimental Sergeant Major Lemeki Dauba Savua, 2nd Battalion Fiji Infantry Regiment.

Civil Division

- Bing Shim Seeto, JP. For services to the community.
- Hargovind Mavji Lodhia, Chairman of the Nadi Township Board. For services to the community.
- Edmond Llewellyn Ashley. For services to the community and to sport.

=== Companion of the Imperial Service Order (ISO) ===
- Walter Herbert Morgan, Controller of Prisons.

=== Queen's Police Medal (QPM) ===
- Desmond Murray McGusty, Senior Superintendent, Fiji Police Force.

=== Queen's Fire Services Medal (QFSM) ===
- Harry Le Vesconte, Chief Fire Officer, Suva Fire Brigade.
