= Philip Broadmead =

British diplomat (1893–1977)

Sir Philip Broadmead KCMG MC
- Broadmead in 1953

British Ambassador to Czechoslovakia
- In office 1950–1953
- Preceded by: Sir Pierson Dixon
- Succeeded by: Sir Derwent Kermode

British Minister to Syria
- In office 1947–1950
- Preceded by: Sir Patrick Scrivener
- Succeeded by: Sir William Montagu-Pollock

British Ambassador to Colombia
- In office 1945–1947
- Preceded by: Thomas Snow
- Succeeded by: Sir Gilbert MacKereth

Personal details
- Born: 3 December 1893
- Died: 23 May 1977 (aged 83)
- Education: Christ Church, Oxford
- Occupation: Diplomat

Sir Philip Mainwaring Broadmead (3 December 1893 – 23 May 1977) was a British diplomat who served as ambassador to Colombia, Syria and Czechoslovakia.

== Early life and education ==
Broadmead was born on 3 December 1893, the son of Colonel Henry Broadmead. He was educated at Wellington College and Christ Church, Oxford.

== Career ==
Broadmead served with the King's Royal Rifle Corps during World War I, rose to the rank of captain and was awarded the Military Cross. In 1920, he joined the diplomatic service as third secretary, and subsequently served in various posts. He was promoted to second secretary in 1923 and to first secretary in 1929. In 1940, he was promoted to counsellor, served in China from 1938 to 1941, and in Brazil from 1941 to 1944. He then returned to London as head of the American Department at the Foreign Office.

From 1945 to 1947, Broadmead served as ambassador to Colombia, and then minister and head of the legation at Damascus from 1947 to 1950. In 1950, he was appointed ambassador to Czechoslovakia, a post he held until 1953.

== Honours ==
Broadmead was appointed Companion of the Order of St Michael and St George (CMG) in the 1944 Birthday Honours, and promoted to Knight Commander (KCMG) in the 1952 Birthday Honours. In 1917, he was awarded the Military Cross (MC).

== See also ==
- Colombia–United Kingdom relations
- Syria–United Kingdom relations
- Czech Republic–United Kingdom relations

Diplomatic posts
Preceded by Thomas Snow	British Ambassador to Colombia; 1945–1947	Succeeded by Sir Gilbert MacKereth
Preceded by Sir Patrick Scrivener	British Minister to Syria; 1947–1950	Succeeded by Sir William Montagu-Pollock
Preceded by Sir Pierson Dixon	British Ambassador to Czechoslovakia; 1950–1953	Succeeded by Sir Derwent Kermode
