= John Ford (diplomat) =

British diplomat (1922–2018)

Sir John Ford KCMG, MC

High Commissioner of the United Kingdom to Canada
- In office 1978–1981
- Preceded by: Sir John Johnston
- Succeeded by: The Lord Moran

Ambassador of the United Kingdom to Indonesia
- In office 1975–1978
- Preceded by: Sir Willis Combs
- Succeeded by: Terence O'Brien

Sir John Archibald Ford, KCMG, MC (19 February 1922 – 16 January 2018) was a British diplomat. He served as British Ambassador to Indonesia from 1975 to 1978 and British High Commissioner to Canada from 1978 to 1981.

== Biography ==
Ford was born in Newcastle-under-Lyme, the son of Ronald Mylne Ford, a solicitor, and Margaret Jesse Coghill. He was educated at College of St Michael and All Angels, Tenbury and Sedbergh School, before being called up for military service in 1941 He was commissioned into the Royal Artillery and was awarded the Military Cross in 1945 for “sustained gallantry, skill and devotion to duty, showing initiative and resource of the highest order” during the battle for Kervenheim in Germany. After the conclusion of the war in Europe, he was posted to Java, Dutch East Indies.

After being demobilized as a temporary Major, Ford went up to Oriel College, Oxford, where he read French and German. He then joined the Foreign Service (later the Diplomatic Service), and was posted to Budapest as a third secretary.
