= Keith Morris (diplomat) =

British diplomat

Sir Keith Elliott Hedley Morris KBE CMG (born 24 October 1934) is a British diplomat who was Ambassador in Bogotá, Colombia, and is best known for his stance on the war on drugs, and his involvement in the 1970 Bobby Moore arrest controversy.

Morris was educated at King's College, Taunton, Corpus Christi College, Cambridge, and Amherst College, Massachusetts, US. He did his national service in the Royal Navy from 1952 to 1954. He joined the Foreign and Commonwealth Office in 1959. His postings were: Dakar, 1960; Algiers, 1962; London, 1963; Paris, 1964; Bogotá, 1967; London, 1971; Warsaw, 1976; Mexico City, 1979; Head of Personnel Policy Department, London, 1984; a sabbatical at the Royal College of Defence Studies, 1986; Milan, 1987; and British Ambassador to Colombia, in Bogotá (1990–1994).

Morris was First Secretary of the British Embassy in Bogotá in 1970 when the England football team came to play a warm-up game in the run-up to the World Cup later that year in Mexico City. Bobby Moore, the captain of the team, was accused of stealing an emerald bracelet from the hotel shop. On 25 May, Mr Moore was charged and placed under house arrest at the home of a local football official but was freed three days later with conditions, so that he could play in the World Cup in Mexico. The case was not officially closed until 1975.

In a 2026 letter to The Guardian regarding the very large increase in the Latin American drug-related criminal presence in Europe at the time, Morris recounts how the boardroom of the British chamber of commerce in Bogotá was destroyed in January 1993 by a car bomb ordered by drug lord Pablo Escobar minutes after he and other members had left.

On 4 July 2001, The Guardian ran a front page article about Keith Morris, who had written a comment piece for the same edition in which he said that the war on drugs was unwinnable, and called for the legalisation of drugs, with state supervision. He admitted that this was an about turn from his previous stance on the war on drugs, and was brought about by his experience of the situation in Colombia which, during his second posting, was at the height of its struggle with the Medellín Cartel.

Morris was married to the late Maria del Carmen Carratalá, with whom he had two sons and two daughters, and later married Maria Samuel (née Callinicos) and is stepfather to her daughter.
