= Philip Parham =

British diplomat

Philip Parham CMG
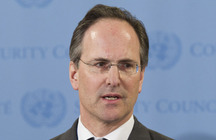

UK Envoy to the Commonwealth
- In office 18 June 2018 – 2021
- Monarchs: Elizabeth II; Charles III

UK Ambassador to the United Arab Emirates
- In office 2014–2018
- Monarch: Elizabeth II
- Preceded by: Dominic Jermey
- Succeeded by: Patrick Moody

UK Ambassador and Deputy Permanent Representative to the United Nations in New York
- In office 2009–2013
- Preceded by: Karen Pierce
- Succeeded by: Peter Wilson

UK High Commissioner to Tanzania
- In office 2006–2009
- Preceded by: Andrew Pocock
- Succeeded by: Diane Corner

Personal details
- Spouse: Kasia (née Giedroyc)
- Children: 7
- Relatives: Mel Giedroyc (sister-in-law); Coky Giedroyc (sister-in-law)
- Education: Eton College
- Alma mater: Christ Church, Oxford

Philip John Parham is a British diplomat.

He was educated at Eton College and Christ Church, Oxford. He joined the Foreign and Commonwealth Office in 1993, served as UK High Commissioner to Tanzania from 2006 to 2009, as Ambassador and UK Deputy Permanent Representative to the United Nations in New York from 2009 to 2013, and as UK Ambassador to the United Arab Emirates from 2014 to 2018. In 2018, he was appointed to be the UK's Envoy to the Commonwealth.

Parham was appointed Companion of the Order of St Michael and St George (CMG) in the 2015 New Year Honours "for services to British multilateral foreign policy interests".

Parham is married to teacher and writer Kasia Giedroyc, sister of comedian Mel Giedroyc and director Coky Giedroyc. They have seven children.
