= Oscar Morland =

British diplomat (1904–1980)

Sir Oscar Morland

British Ambassador to Japan
- In office 1959–1963
- Monarch: Elizabeth II
- Prime Minister: Harold Macmillan
- Preceded by: Sir Daniel Lascelles
- Succeeded by: Sir Francis Rundall

British Ambassador to Indonesia
- In office 1953–1956
- Monarch: Elizabeth II
- Prime Minister: Winston Churchill; Anthony Eden
- Preceded by: Sir Derwent Kermode
- Succeeded by: Dermot MacDermot

Personal details
- Born: 23 March 1904
- Died: 20 May 1980 (aged 76)
- Spouse: Alice
- Children: 4
- Education: Leighton Park School
- Alma mater: King's College, Cambridge

Sir Oscar Charles Morland, GBE, KCMG, (23 March 1904 – 20 May 1980) was a British diplomat. He was the British ambassador in Japan and Indonesia.

== Early life ==
Oscar Charles Morland was son of Harold John Morland (28 Jul 1869 – 9 Oct 1939).

He married Alice on 1932, daughter of Sir Francis Oswald Lindley, PC, GCMG (12 Jun 1872 – 17 Aug 1950). The union produced four sons.

He was educated at Leighton Park School and at King's College, Cambridge.

== Career ==
- Joined HM Consular Service, 1927.
- Served in Japan, Manchuria, London. Under Sec., Cabinet Office,
- 1950–1953; Ambassador to Indonesia,
- 1953–1956; Asst Under-Sec., FO,
- 1956–1959. Mem., Leeds Regional Hosp. Bd,
- 1959–1963. Ambassador to Japan
- 1965–1974 (Chm. Mental Health and Geriatrics Cttee, 1972–74)

== See also ==
- List of Ambassadors from the United Kingdom to Indonesia
- List of Ambassadors from the United Kingdom to Japan
- Anglo-Japanese relations

== Notes ==
Diplomatic posts
Preceded by Sir Derwent Kermode	British Ambassador to Indonesia; 1953–1956	Succeeded by Dermot MacDermot
Preceded by Sir Daniel Lascelles	British Ambassador to Japan; 1959–1963	Succeeded by Sir Francis Rundall
