= Willis Combs =

New Zealand diplomat (1893–1984)

Sir Willis Ide Combs KCVO CMG

British Ambassador to Indonesia
- In office 1970–1975
- Preceded by: Henry Hainworth
- Succeeded by: Sir John Ford

Personal details
- Born: 6 May 1916 Melbourne, Australia
- Died: 13 January 1994 (aged 77) England
- Children: 2
- Education: Victoria University College,St John's College, Cambridge
- Occupation: Diplomat

Sir Willis Ide Combs (6 May 1916 – 13 January 1994) was a New Zealand diplomat who served as British Ambassador to Indonesia from 1970 to 1975.

== Early life and education ==
Combs was born on 6 May 1916 in Melbourne, Australia, the son of Willis Ide Combs of Napier, New Zealand, who was working in Australia at the time. He was educated at Dannevirke High School; Victoria University College, Wellington, where he read classics; and St John's College, Cambridge, where he took a first in Modern Languages.

== Career ==
After serving in Army Intelligence with the British Armed Forces during World War II in Western Europe and in Whitehall, London, Combs entered the Foreign Service in 1947 and was immediately dispatched to Paris as second secretary (commercial), rising to first secretary the following year. In 1951, he was at Rio de Janeiro as first secretary before he was transferred to Peking as first secretary and consul in 1953, and Chargé d’affaires in 1954.

Combs then worked at the Foreign Office in 1956 and in 1959 was sent to Iraq as counsellor (commercial). After serving with the Diplomatic Service Inspectorate from 1963 to 1965, he was appointed counsellor and Head of Chancery at the British Embassy in Rangoon in 1965 before he returned to the Foreign Office three years later as Assistant Under-Secretary for Foreign and Commonwealth Affairs (Trade).

From 1970 to 1975, Combs served as British Ambassador to Indonesia. During his tour in Jakarta trade increased steadily between the two countries. The highlight of his term was the five-day state visit of Queen Elizabeth II in 1974. The Times wrote on the occasion, "the Royal visit is regarded as setting the seal on the good relations between Britain and Indonesia after the strains which developed when the late President Sukarno carried out his policy of confrontation with Malaysia." After his tour had been extended to include the royal visit, Combs was knighted later that year.

On his retirement from the service in 1975, Combs returned to New Zealand and became a lecturer at Christchurch University but within a year returned to settle in England. He worked for some time as a consultant in Oman assisting the state in modernising its foreign service.

== Personal life and death ==
Combs married Grace Willis in 1942, and they had two daughters.

Combs died on 13 January 1994, and his funeral was held at Wadhurst, East Sussex.

== Honours ==
Combs was appointed Companion of the Order of St Michael and St George (CMG) in the 1962 Birthday Honours. He was appointed Knight Commander of the Royal Victorian Order (KCVO) in 1974.

== See also ==
- Indonesia–United Kingdom relations

Diplomatic posts
Preceded by Henry Hainworth	British Ambassador to Indonesia; 1970–1975	Succeeded by Sir John Ford
