= List of ambassadors of the United Kingdom to Indonesia =

The ambassador of the United Kingdom to Indonesia is the United Kingdom's foremost diplomatic representative in the Republic of Indonesia, and in charge of the UK's diplomatic mission. The official title is His Britannic Majesty's Ambassador to the Republic of Indonesia.

The British ambassador to Indonesia is also accredited to the Democratic Republic of Timor-Leste.

== Ambassadors to Indonesia ==
- 1950–1953: Sir Derwent Kermode
- 1953–1956: Sir Oscar Morland
- 1956–1959: Dermot MacDermot
- 1959–1963: Sir Leslie Fry
- 1963–1966: Andrew Gilchrist
- 1966–1968: Horace Phillips
- 1968–1970: Henry Hainworth
- 1970–1975: Sir Willis Combs
- 1975–1978: Sir John Ford
- 1978–1981: Terence O'Brien
- 1982–1984: Robert Brash
- 1984–1988: Sir Alan Donald
- 1988–1990: William White
- 1990–1994: Roger Carrick
- 1994–1997: Graham Burton
- 1997–2000: Robin Christopher
- 2000–2004: Richard Gozney
- 2004–2008: Charles Humfrey
- 2008–2011: Martin Hatfull
- 2011–2014: Mark Canning
- 2014: Rebecca Razavi (acting)
- 2014–2019: Moazzam Malik
- 2019–2023: Owen Jenkins
- 2023: Matthew Charles Downing (acting)
- 2023–present: Dominic Jermey
