= Derwent Kermode =

British diplomat (1898–1960)

Sir Derwent William Kermode KCMG
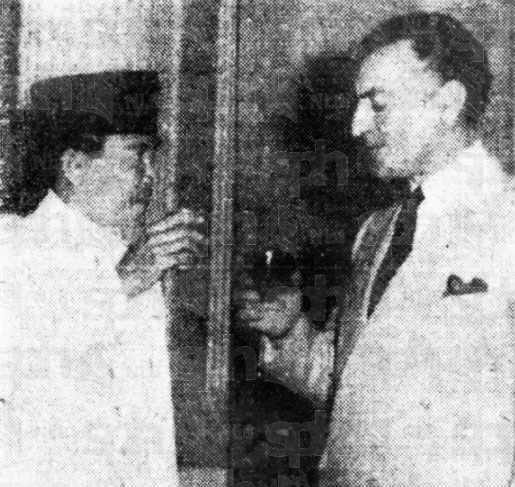
- Kermode and President Sukarno in 1950

British Ambassador to Czechoslovakia
- In office 1953–1955
- Preceded by: Sir Philip Broadmead
- Succeeded by: Sir Clinton Pelham

British Ambassador to Indonesia
- In office 1950–1953
- Preceded by: Post established
- Succeeded by: Sir Oscar Morland

Personal details
- Born: 19 June 1898
- Died: 12 January 1960 (aged 61)
- Relations: Uncle: Philip Moore Callow Kermode; Aunt: Josephine Kermode; Grandchildren include Chris Kermode and Robin Kermode
- Children: 4
- Occupation: Diplomat, priest

Sir Derwent William Kermode (19 June 1898 – 12 January 1960) was a British diplomat who served as Ambassador to Indonesia from 1950 to 1953 and Ambassador to Czechoslovakia from 1953 to 1955.

== Early life and education ==
Kermode was born on 19 June 1898, the son of Frederick Bacon Kermode of the Isle of Man and Florence née Marshall. He was educated at Eastbourne College, Sussex.

== Career ==
After serving during World War I with the Royal Field Artillery, Kermode entered the Consular Service in 1921. He served in various consular posts in the Far East including at Tokyo, Yokohama, Kobe, Seoul (Consul-General), Mukden and Tamsui.

Kermode was appointed the first British Ambassador to Indonesia in 1950 following the country's transfer of sovereignty and the establishment of an Embassy in Jakarta. He remained in the post until 1953. He then served as Ambassador to Czechoslovakia from 1953 to 1955.

Kermode retired to England and was ordained a priest. From 1956, he was curate of St Peter's Church, Portishead, Somerset, before being installed as rector at Cocking and Bepton in West Sussex in January 1959, a post he retained for a year until his death.

== Personal life and death ==
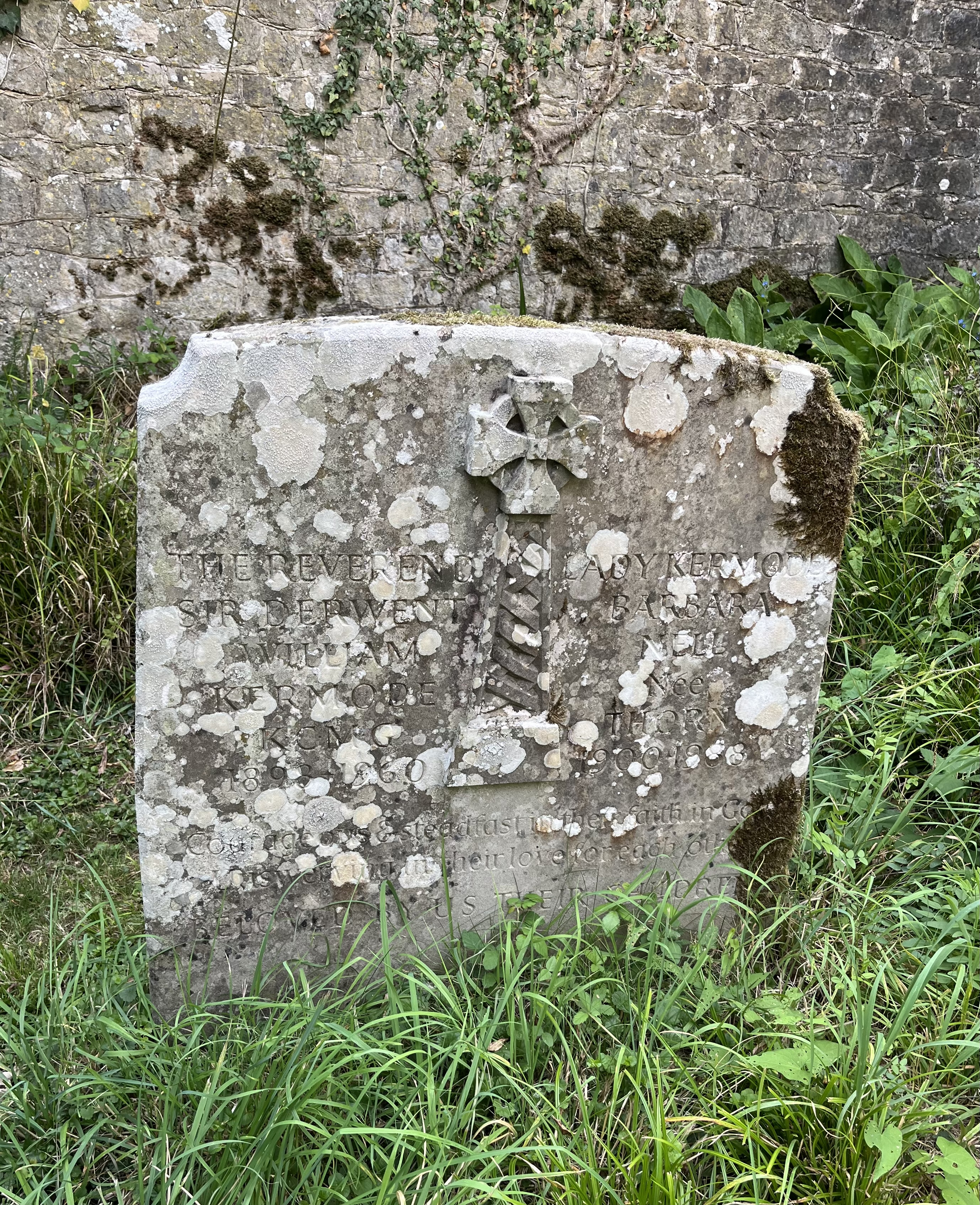
Sir Derwent Kermode’s gravestone in Cocking churchyard.

Kermode married Barbara Thorn in 1925 and they had two sons and two daughters.

Kermode died on 12 January 1960, aged 61.

== Honours ==
Kermode was appointed Companion of the Order of St Michael and St George (CMG) in the 1948 New Year Honours, and promoted to Knight Commander (KCMG) in the 1952 Birthday Honours.

== See also ==
- Indonesia–United Kingdom relations
- Czech Republic–United Kingdom relations

Diplomatic posts
New office	British Ambassador to Indonesia; 1950–1953	Succeeded by Sir Oscar Morland
Preceded by Sir Philip Broadmead	British Ambassador to Czechoslovakia; 1953–1955	Succeeded by Sir Clinton Pelham
