= Owen Jenkins =

Owen Jenkins may refer to:

- Owen Jenkins (diplomat), British diplomat
- Owen Jenkins (priest) (1906–1988), Welsh Anglican priest
- Owen Jenkins (rugby union) (born 1993), Welsh rugby union player
- Glyn Jenkins (Owen Glyndwr Jenkins, 1927–2014), Australian politician
