= Montague Paske-Smith =

British diplomat (1886–1946)

Montague Paske-Smith CMG CBE FRGS

British envoy extraordinary and minister plenipotentiary to Colombia
- In office 1936–1941
- Preceded by: Spencer Dickson
- Succeeded by: Thomas Snow

Personal details
- Born: 1886 Calgary
- Died: 10 January 1946 (aged 59 or 60)
- Children: 2
- Occupation: Diplomat

Montague Bentley Talbot Paske-Smith (1886 – 10 January 1946) was a British diplomat who served as envoy extraordinary and minister plenipotentiary to Colombia from 1936 to 1941.

== Early life and education ==
Paske-Smith was born in 1886 in Calgary, Canada, the eldest son of Rev. Edward Paske-Smith of Newton-on-Ouse. He was educated at Elizabeth College, Guernsey.

== Career ==
Paske-Smith joined the Eastern consular service as a student interpreter in Japan in 1907. From 1909 to 1910, he was acting vice-consul at Manila, and then in 1914 at Shimonoseki. He then returned to Manila where he spent six years first as acting vice-consul, then vice-consul, before he was promoted to consul-general in 1919.

He was then transferred to Japan, where he served as vice-consul in Osaka from 1919 to 1921; acting consul-general in Kobe from 1921 to 1922; and consul in Nagasaki in 1924, before he returned to Osaka in 1927. In 1930, he was acting consul-general at Manila, and then consul in Dairen in 1931; Honolulu between 1932 and 1934; and then Madrid from 1934 to 1936. In 1936, he was appointed envoy extraordinary and minister plenipotentiary to Colombia at Bogota, a post he held until 1941 when he retired from the service.

== Personal life and death ==
Paske-Smith married Maria Teresa Bertran de Lis of Madrid in 1912, and they had two daughters.

Paske-Smith died on 10 January 1946.

== Publications ==
- England and Japan: The First Fifty Years (1927)
- Western Barbarians in Japan and Formosa in Tokugawa Days (1930)
- Japanese Traditions of Christianity (1930)
- Early British Consuls in Hawaii (1936)

== Honours ==
- Paske-Smith was appointed Companion of the Order of St Michael and St George (CMG) in the 1941 Birthday Honours.
- He was appointed Officer of the Order of the British Empire (OBE) in 1920.
- He was promoted to Commander of the Order of the British Empire (CBE) in 1923.

== See also ==
- Colombia–United Kingdom relations

Diplomatic posts
Preceded by Spencer Dickson	British envoy extraordinary and minister plenipotentiary to Colombia; 1936–1941	Succeeded by Thomas Snow
