= Robin Kermode =

English actor (born 1958)

- Born: 9 July 1958 (age 67); Nelson, Lancashire, England
- Education: Central School of Speech and Drama
- Occupation: Actor
- Years active: 1978–present
- Known for: Ffizz, The Ruth Rendell Mysteries, The Iron Lady, Wilde, the Norman Conquests, She Stoops to Conquer
- Spouses: Mairead Carty (m. 1999–2003); Sian Hansen (m. 2013)
- Website: robinkermode.com

Robin William Kermode (born 9 July 1958) is an English actor, author and communications coach. He is best known for his roles in Never the Twain, Ffizz, The Ruth Rendell Mysteries, Iron Lady, Wilde, the Norman Conquests, She Stoops to Conquer and Blithe Spirit.

== Early life and education ==
Kermode was born in Nelson, Lancashire, he attended Abingdon School in Abingdon-on-Thames from 1969 until 1976. He was a keen actor at School, starring in Badger's Green, The Winslow Boy, Journey's End and as Lawrence of Arabia in Ross. He was also on the editorial board of The Abingdonian and was Head of School in 1976. He is the brother of tennis player Chris Kermode and grandson of Sir Derwent Kermode, a former British Ambassador to Indonesia and the Czech Republic.

He studied drama at the Central School of Speech and Drama from 1976 to 1979.

== Career ==
Kermode started his career in theatre and received an early positive review in the Stage in 1979 when he played Mr Medley in The Man of Mode. In 1992, at the Oxford Playhouse he appeared in Mark Dornford-May's production of Feydeau's A Pig in a Poke. He played Algy twice in The Importance of Being Earnest. In parallel with his stage career, Kermode has a long career in television. After some small roles, his career took off in the comedy series, Never the Twain, playing the son of one of the warring antique dealers, played by Donald Sinden, who falls in love with the daughter of the other, played by Windsor Davies. He gradually moved into a number of roles as police officers and began to work more in film. While working in television he appeared in leading soaps, including Emmerdale, Casualty and EastEnders.

His performance as John Major in The Iron Lady, building on his earlier portrayal of the politician Simon Hughes in the TV Movie, Wall of Silence, worked well in the film. He also appeared in Shiner, Julie and the Cadillacs and Wilde.

== Filmography ==
=== Television ===
- 2012 Spy: Julian Sutton-Jones
- 2010 Inspector Lewis: Interviewer
- 2008 Harley Street: Consultant
- 2007 Casualty 2007–2011: Philip Kemp / Peter Dibden – two episodes
- 2007 The Inspector Lynley Mysteries: Tony Stevens
- 2006 Emmerdale: DI Derek Carp
- 2006 Angel Cake (TV movie): Paul
- 2006 The Line of Beauty (TV mini-series): Pat Grayson
- 2005 Mike Bassett: Manager: Dr. Moss (Mesmos)
- 2005 Derailed (TV Movie): Andrew Grant
- 2004 Coupling: Dr. Reynolds
- 2004 Mile High: D.I. Hamilton
- 2004 Wall of Silence (TV movie): MP Simon Hughes
- 2003 M.I.T.: Murder Investigation Team (TV mini-series): Hospital Administrator
- 2003 Jonathan Creek: Mr. Jellcoe
- 2002 Doctors 2002–2014: David Clarkwell, Peter Franks, Mike Everall, Clive Garrett – four episodes
- 1998 The Bill 1998 and 2005: Pennhaligan / Robert Fellowes – three episodes
- 1998 EastEnders: Det. Sgt. Kidman – three episodes
- 1997 Birds of a Feather: Jonathan
- 1996 The Ruth Rendell Mysteries 1996–1998: Sgt. Vine / Det. Sgt. Vine – five episodes
- 1995 Pie in the Sky: Reverend Beaulieu
- 1995 The Upper Hand: Gary
- 1994 Men Behaving Badly: Ray – three episodes
- 1989 French Fields 1989–90: Hugh Trendle – twelve episodes
- 1988 Boon: Tommy Clayton
- 1987 Ffizz 1987–1989: eleven episodes
- 1987 C.A.T.S. Eyes: Tom Byers
- 1986 Dodger, Bonzo and the Rest: Shop assistant – two episodes
- 1984 Shroud for a Nightingale (TV mini-series) – Arnold Dowson – three episodes
- 1982 The Agatha Christie Hour: Jack Hartington
- 1981 Never the Twain 1981–1983: David Peel – seventeen episodes
- 1981 The Winter's Tale (TV Movie): Florizel

=== Films ===
- 2019: Close: Edward
- 2016: Mob Handed
- 2011: The Iron Lady: John Major
- 2000: Shiner
- 1999: Julie and the Cadillacs
- 1997: Wilde

== See also ==
- List of Old Abingdonians

== Bibliography ==
- Kermode, Robin (2013). Speak So Your Audience Will Listen: 7 Steps to Confident and Successful Public Speaking. Pendle Publishing. ISBN 9780955530111.
- Kermode, Robin (2013). Forever Ends on Friday. CreateSpace Independent Publishing Platform. ISBN 9781481997416.
- Kermode, Robin (16 April 2007). The Flowerpot Man: (A diary of a divorce from Nisi to Absolute). BookBaby. ISBN 9781617923104.
- Kermode, Robin (4 February 2013). Become a Brilliant Speaker. CreateSpace Independent Publishing Platform. ISBN 9781482365658.
