= Ffizz =

British television sitcom

- Genre: Sitcom
- Written by: Richard Fegen; Andrew Norriss
- Directed by: Derrick Goodwin
- Starring: Richard Griffiths; Benjamin Whitrow; Felicity Montagu; Robin Kermode; Phyllida Law; George Ballantine
- Composer: Denis King
- Country of origin: United Kingdom
- Original language: English
- No. of series: 2
- No. of episodes: 12

Production
- Running time: 30 minutes
- Production company: Thames Television

Original release
- Network: ITV
- Release: 9 September 1987 – 29 August 1989

Ffizz is a British television sitcom created by ITV which ran from 9 September 1987 to 29 August 1989 which followed Jack Mowbray (Richard Griffiths) and Hugo Walker (Benjamin Whitrow), who owned a wine business but never had to actually run it until their accountant died leaving them not only with the work but the surprising knowledge that they were out of money. It was directed by Derrick Goodwin and also starred Felicity Montagu as Griselda and Robin Kermode as Allan. It ran for two series totaling twelve episodes. The complete series was released on DVD in the United Kingdom by Network DVD on 3 September 2018.

== Episodes ==
=== Series 1 ===
1. Lilies of the Field
2. And On the Third Day
3. Play It By the Book
4. Pulling Together
5. The Big Chief
6. With Friends Like These

=== Series 2 ===
1. Plus Ça Change
2. Mother Knows Best
3. Love In Store
4. A Damn Close Run Thing
5. Matter of Principle
6. Sickness and Health
