= Andrew Pocock =

British diplomat

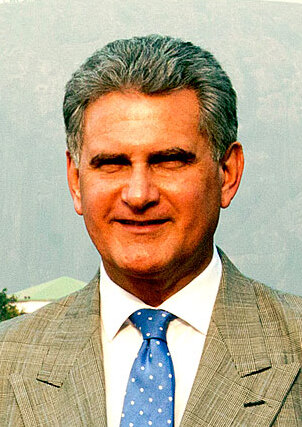
Sir Andrew Pocock KCMG

Sir Andrew John Pocock KCMG (born 23 August 1955) is a British former diplomat who was High Commissioner to Nigeria and Permanent Representative to ECOWAS 2012–15.

== Early life and education ==
Born in Trinidad and Tobago to John and Vida Pocock, Andrew Pocock was educated at St Mary's College, Trinidad, Queen Mary, University of London (BA, MA) and Peterhouse, Cambridge (PhD).

== Career ==
Pocock joined the Foreign Office in 1981. He has been stationed in Lagos (1983-1986), Washington DC, United States (1988-1992), Canberra (1997-2001), Dar es Salaam (2003-2006), Harare, Zimbabwe (2006-2009), Canada (2011-2012) and Nigeria (2012–15). In July 2015 the Foreign Office announced that Pocock was to retire from the Diplomatic Service.

== Personal life ==
Pocock is married to Julie Pocock.

== Honours ==
In 2016, he was awarded the Hubert Walter Award for Reconciliation and Interfaith Cooperation by the Archbishop of Canterbury "for his service to peace and stability in Nigeria".

Diplomatic posts
Preceded by Richard Clarke	British High Commissioner to Tanzania; 2003–2006	Succeeded by Philip Parham
Preceded by Roderick Pullen	British Ambassador to Zimbabwe; 2006–2009	Succeeded by Mark Canning
Preceded by Anthony Cary	British High Commissioner to Canada; 2011–2012	Succeeded by Corin Robertson; Acting
Preceded by Andrew Lloyd	British High Commissioner to Nigeria; 2012–2015	Succeeded by Paul Arkwright
