= George James Turner =

English barrister, politician and judge

Sir George James Turner, FRS (5 February 1798 – 9 July 1867) was an English barrister, politician and judge. He became a Lord Justice of Appeal in chancery.

== Life ==
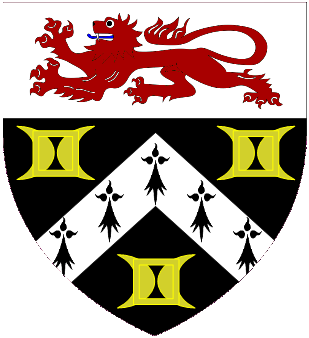
Arms: Sable a chevron Ermine between three millrinds Or on a chief Argent a lion passant Gules. Crest: A lion passant Gules holding in the dexter paw a branch of laurel Vert.

Born at Great Yarmouth on 5 February 1798, he was the youngest of eight sons of Richard Turner, for many years the vicar there; William Turner was his elder brother. George was educated at Charterhouse School and then at Pembroke College, Cambridge, where his uncle Joseph Turner was Master. He graduated B.A. in 1819, was elected a Fellow, and proceeded M.A. in 1822. He was called to the bar at Lincoln's Inn in 1821.

After building up an extensive practice as a junior counsel, Turner was made a Queen's Counsel in 1840. In 1847 he was elected, in the Conservative interest, Member of Parliament for Coventry, and represented the borough until his promotion to the bench in April 1851. He introduced and carried the measure known as "Turner's Act" (Court of Chancery (England) Act 1850, An Act to diminish the delay and expense of proceedings in the High Court of Chancery in England), intended to simplify parts of the machinery of the Court of Chancery.

In April 1851, Turner was appointed a Vice-Chancellor of England, and received the customary knighthood. In the same year he was sworn a member of the Privy Council. In 1852 he was on the chancery reform commission, and in 1853 he became a Lord Justice of Appeal in chancery, keeping the position until his death, which took place on 9 July 1867 at 23 Park Crescent, London. He was buried at Kelshall, near Royston, Hertfordshire.

Turner was a bencher of Lincoln's Inn, a governor of Charterhouse School, and a Fellow of the Royal Society. On 7 June 1853 he had received the honorary degree of D.C.L. from the university of Oxford. As a judge he opposed attempts to narrow the limits of the jurisdiction of the chancery court, and made efforts to expand its remedial powers to meet contemporary developments.

== Works ==
In 1832 Turner edited a volume of chancery reports dealing with cases between 1822 and 1824, with James Russell.

== Family ==
Turner married, in 1823, Louisa, youngest daughter of Edward Jones of Brackley, Northamptonshire, by whom he had six sons, including Bishop James Turner, and three daughters.

== Notes ==
Attribution

This article incorporates text from a publication now in the public domain: Lee, Sidney, ed. (1899). "Turner, George James". Dictionary of National Biography. Vol. 57. London: Smith, Elder & Co.
