= List of ambassadors of the United Kingdom to the United Arab Emirates =

His Majesty's Ambassador to the United Arab Emirates
- Coat of arms of the United Kingdom
- Incumbent; Edward Hobart since May 2023
- Foreign, Commonwealth and Development Office; British Embassy Abu Dhabi; British Embassy Dubai
- Style: His Excellency; Mr Ambassador (Informal)
- Appointer: Charles III
- Term length: No fixed term
- Inaugural holder: Martin Buckmaster
- Deputy: Stephanie Al-Qaq (Deputy Head of Mission); Andrew Jackson (British Consul General to Dubai)
- Website: United Arab Emirates and the UK

The ambassador of the United Kingdom to the United Arab Emirates is the United Kingdom's foremost diplomatic representative in the United Arab Emirates (UAE), and head of the UK's diplomatic mission in the UAE. The official title is His Britannic Majesty's Ambassador to the United Arab Emirates.

Before the UAE was granted independence from the United Kingdom in 1971, each of the Trucial States was home to its own political deputation from the United Kingdom, with its own political officer or political agent heading the deputation. Of these deputations and political representatives, the oldest and most important was to the emir of Abu Dhabi, who was based in the city of Abu Dhabi, now the capital city of the UAE and the site of the modern British embassy. The UK also maintains an embassy in Dubai, subordinate to the Abu Dhabi embassy, headed by a consul general.

== List of heads of mission ==
=== Political agents and officers in Abu Dhabi ===
- 1955–1958: Martin Buckmaster
- 1958–1959: Edric Worsnop
- 1959–1961: Edward Henderson
- 1961–1965: Sir Hugh Boustead
- 1965–1968: Sir Archie Lamb
- 1968–1968: E. F. Henderson
- 1968–1971: James Treadwell

=== Ambassadors to the United Arab Emirates ===
- 1971–1973: James Treadwell
- 1973–1977: Donal McCarthy
- 1977–1981: Sir David Roberts
- 1981–1986: Sir Harold Walker
- 1986–1989: Michael Tait
- 1990–1994: Sir Graham Burton
- 1994–1998: Anthony Harris
- 1998–2003: Patrick Nixon
- 2003–2006: Richard Makepeace
- 2006–2010: Edward Oakden
- 2010–2014: Dominic Jermey
- 2014–2018: Philip Parham
- 2018–2023: Patrick Moody
- 2023-present: Edward Hobart
