= Chris Kermode =

English tennis player (born 1965)

- Country (sports): United Kingdom
- Born: 13 January 1965 (age 60)
- Plays: Right-handed
- Prize money: $447

Singles
- Highest ranking: No. 742 (10 February 1986)

Doubles
- Highest ranking: No. 284 (4 February 1985)

Chris Kermode (born 13 January 1965) is a retired English male tennis player, a former tournament director and the executive chairman & president of the Association of Tennis Professionals (ATP) from 2014 to 2019.

On 20 November 2013 Kermode was appointed as the ATP executive chairman & president to succeed Brad Drewett who died of an illness in May 2013. His three-year term started on 1 January 2014, and he is based in the ATP's London office. On 7 March 2019 the ATP announced that Kermode would leave his position at year-end. An article on ESPN.com suggests Kermode's departure was due to a "palace coup engineered" in part by Novak Djokovic.

Kermode has been involved in tennis for more than 30 years. Following his modest career as a professional player from 1985 to 1988, Kermode worked in London as a tennis coach and later served as the tournament director of the Queen's Club Championships. From 2008 to 2014 he has been the managing director of the ATP World Tour's season-ending event ATP World Tour Finals. In addition Kermode has worked in the music and film business.

Before being appointed by the ATP Kermode applied for the position of chief executive at the British Lawn Tennis Association (LTA) but was not selected.

== Family ==
Kermode is the grandson of Sir Derwent Kermode who was the British ambassador to Indonesia (1950–1953) and the Czech Republic (1953–1955) before taking Holy Orders and becoming vicar at Cocking, West Sussex.
