= Mark Canning (diplomat) =

British diplomat

Mark Canning CMG
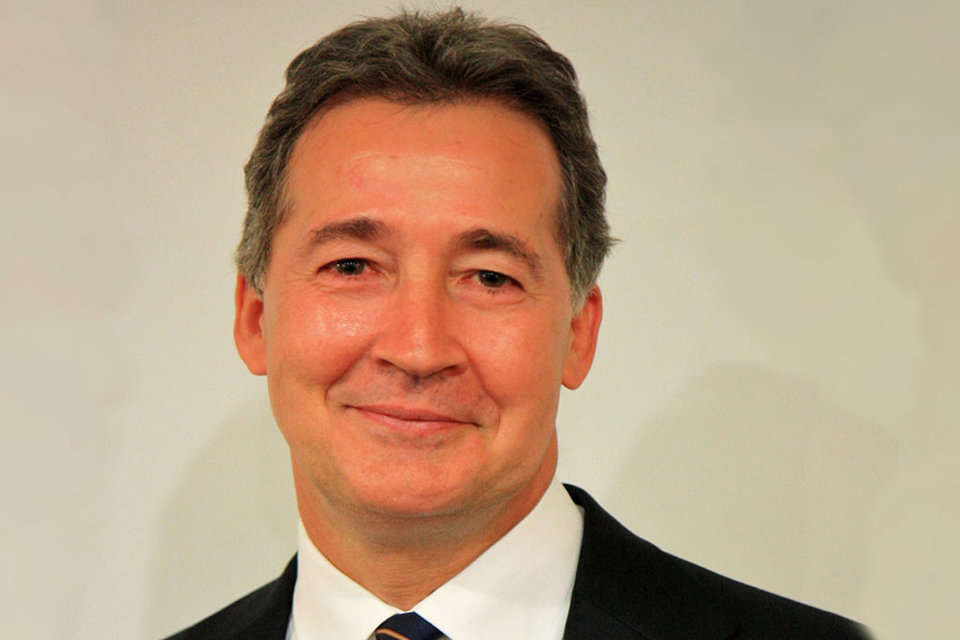

British Ambassador to Indonesia
- In office 2011–2014
- Monarch: Elizabeth II
- Prime Minister: David Cameron
- Preceded by: Martin Hatfull
- Succeeded by: Moazzam Malik

British Ambassador to Zimbabwe
- In office 2009–2011
- Monarch: Elizabeth II
- Prime Minister: Gordon Brown; David Cameron
- Preceded by: Andrew Pocock
- Succeeded by: Deborah Bronnert

British Ambassador to Myanmar
- In office 2006–2009
- Monarch: Elizabeth II
- Prime Minister: Tony Blair; Gordon Brown
- Preceded by: Vicky Bowman
- Succeeded by: Andrew Heyn

Personal details
- Born: 15 December 1954 (age 71)
- Children: 1
- Education: Downside School
- Alma mater: University College London
- Occupation: Diplomat

Mark Canning CMG (born 15 December 1954) is a British former diplomat and was British Ambassador to Indonesia between August 2011 and 2014, before being succeeded by Moazzam Malik. He served concurrently as British Ambassador to the Association of South East Asian Nations (ASEAN) and to Timor Leste. He is a career member of the UK Foreign Service and has occupied a series of challenging and sensitive senior diplomatic appointments. Prior to his current position he served as Britain's Ambassador to Zimbabwe (2009–2011) and to Myanmar (Burma) (2006–2009). Prior to his three ambassadorial assignments, he served as a Deputy High Commissioner at the British High Commission in Kuala Lumpur, Malaysia.

Canning was educated at Downside School and University College London. He holds also a Masters in Business Administration. He joined the British Foreign and Commonwealth Office (FCO) in 1974 and has served in a wide variety of diplomatic roles, both at home and overseas. His appointments at the Foreign Office in London included significant exposure to counter-terrorism, security and other foreign policy issues. His overseas postings have had a strong focus on the emerging markets of the Asia Pacific and support to UK business, but he has also served in Africa, the US and Latin America. He is an experienced media operator, who has made frequent appearances in the broadcast and print media. As a noted expert on the politics and economics of the nations of South East Asia, Canning has also lectured at a range of academic and other institutions including the Royal College of Defence Studies.

Canning was appointed Companion of the Order of St Michael and St George (CMG) in The Queen's 2009 New Year Honours list. He is married with one daughter.

Since leaving the British Diplomatic Service in 2014 he has acted as an advisor to a range of companies active in Southeast Asia and elsewhere.

Diplomatic posts
Preceded by Vicky Bowman	British Ambassador to Myanmar; 2006–2009	Succeeded by Andrew Heyn
Preceded by Andrew Pocock	British Ambassador to Zimbabwe; 2009–2011	Succeeded by Deborah Bronnert
Preceded by Martin Hatfull	British Ambassador to Indonesia; 2011–2014	Succeeded by Moazzam Malik
