= Moazzam Malik (diplomat) =

British Diplomat

Moazzam Malik CMG
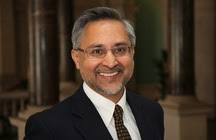

British Ambassador to Indonesia
- In office October 2014 – June 2019
- Monarch: Elizabeth II
- Prime Minister: David Cameron; Theresa May
- Preceded by: Mark Canning
- Succeeded by: Owen Jenkins

Personal details
- Born: Moazzam Tufail Malik North West London, London, England
- Children: 3
- Education: London School of Economics (BSc (Hons)); University of Oxford

Moazzam Tufail Malik CMG is a former British civil servant and diplomat.

He was the British Ambassador to Indonesia, ASEAN and Timor-Leste from October 2014 to July 2019, and Director-General Africa in the UK's Foreign, Commonwealth and Development Office from its creation in September 2020. Malik's resignation in March 2022 drew wide coverage on the state of the merger between the Foreign Office and Department for International Development. In 2024, Malik published a paper with Lord Mark Sedwill and Tom Fletcher advocating for renewal of the UK's approach to international affairs.

He is Chief Executive Officer at Save the Children UK; and Chair at the Muslim Charities Forum, an umbrella NGO for faith based charities in the UK.

== Education ==
Malik has a BSc in economics from the London School of Economics. He holds a master's degree from Oxford University, and a Chartered Diploma in Accounting and Finance from the ACCA. He studied at Whitmore High School and Lowlands Sixth Form College in Harrow.

== Career ==
Malik was Managing Director at the World Resources Institute from 2022-24. At WRI, Malik championed work on Asia, international finance, and equity in climate and development action and oversaw organisational functions across the country network. In July 2024, he published an op-ed calling for a shift from a voluntary system of official development assistance to a new binding framework for official climate and development assistance.

As Director General Africa at FCDO, Malik oversaw the UK's Embassy network across Africa, alongside thematic directorates working on international finance, conflict, good governance and human rights, and the Commonwealth. Malik was previously Director-General for Country Programmes at the UK Department for International Development (October 2019 to September 2020).

Prior to joining the Foreign and Commonwealth Office (FCO) in 2014 as Ambassador, Malik held a number of senior positions at the Department for International Development (DFID). In 2013, he was Acting Director General in DFID, overseeing the UK's development relationship with international organisations such as the UN, World Bank, Asian Development Bank and IMF, and managing the UK's engagement in the Western Asia and the Middle East.

From 2010 to 2013, he was DFID Director for Western Asia and Stabilisation leading a team of 300 people with a budget of US$750m working across Afghanistan, Pakistan, and Central Asia. Prior to that he was DFID Director for UN, Conflict and Humanitarian. He led work on the 2006 UK White Paper on international development, 'Making Governance Work for the Poor'. From 2003, he was Principal Private Secretary to Baroness Valerie Amos and then Hilary Benn MP, Secretary of State for International Development. He was closely involved in major humanitarian operations throughout this period, including the response to the 2004 Aceh tsunami, 2008 Burma cyclone and multiple conflict-related responses.

Malik was a founding member of the UN Secretary General's Advisory Group on the Central Emergency Revolving Fund as well as OECD DAC Peer Reviewer for Sweden. He was a trustee of an NGO eradicating child labour, Goodweave UK, and a member of the Advisory Board to the UK All-Party Parliamentary Group on Conflict.

Earlier in his career, Malik worked as a consultant economist for UK corporations and the World Bank; managed an engineering business; advised on monetary and foreign exchange policy in the Bank of Uganda; led an urban regeneration NGO focused on international trade in London; and as a researcher at the London School of Economics and the Overseas Development Institute.

On his appointment as HM Ambassador to Indonesia, Malik expressed strong ambition for the UK partnership with a country that is "rapidly growing country at the heart of Asia's future". Malik learned Indonesian in London and Yogyakarta before taking up his assignment. On leaving Jakarta, he wrote a "farewell letter" published in the Indonesian newspaper Kompas that was very widely read in print and online. The English language paper The Jakarta Post published an editorial praising his farewell message.

== Personal life ==
Malik was born and grew up in North West London. His father, Mohammed Amin Malik, migrated to Britain in the late 1950s from Pakistan in search of a better life. Malik is married to Rachel Malik and has three children. He is a Liverpool F.C. fan, plays tennis, and follows the Pakistani cricket team.

Diplomatic posts
Preceded by Mark Canning	British Ambassador to Indonesia; 2014–2019	Succeeded by Owen Jenkins
