= List of ambassadors of the United Kingdom to Colombia =

The ambassador of the United Kingdom to the Republic of Colombia is the United Kingdom's foremost diplomatic representative in Colombia, and head of the UK's diplomatic mission in Bogotá. The official title is His Britannic Majesty's Ambassador to Colombia.

== List of heads of mission ==
=== Diplomats to Colombia ===
- 1825: John Potter Hamilton and Patrick Campbell Plenipotentiaries
- 1826–1829: Alexander Cockburn Envoy Extraordinary and Minister Plenipotentiary
  - 1829: James Henderson Consul general in Bogotá
- 1829–1831: William Turner Envoy Extraordinary

=== Diplomats to New Granada ===
- 1831–1838: William Turner Envoy Extraordinary until 1837; then Envoy Extraordinary and Minister Plenipotentiary
- 1838–1842: William Pitt Adams Chargé d'Affaires
- 1841–1843: Robert Steward Chargé d'Affaires
- 1843–1854: Daniel Florence O'Leary Chargé d'Affaires

=== United States of Colombia ===
==== Charge d'affaires and consuls-general ====
- 1866–1873: Robert Bunch

==== Ministers resident and consuls-general ====
- 1873–1878: Robert Bunch
- 1878–1881: Charles Edward Mansfield
- 1881–1882: Augustus Henry Mounsey
- 1882–1884: James Plaister Harriss-Gastrell
- Mar – Dec 1884: Frederick St John
- 1885–1892: William Dickson
- 1892–1897: George Jenner

=== Republic of Colombia ===
==== Ministers resident and consuls-general ====
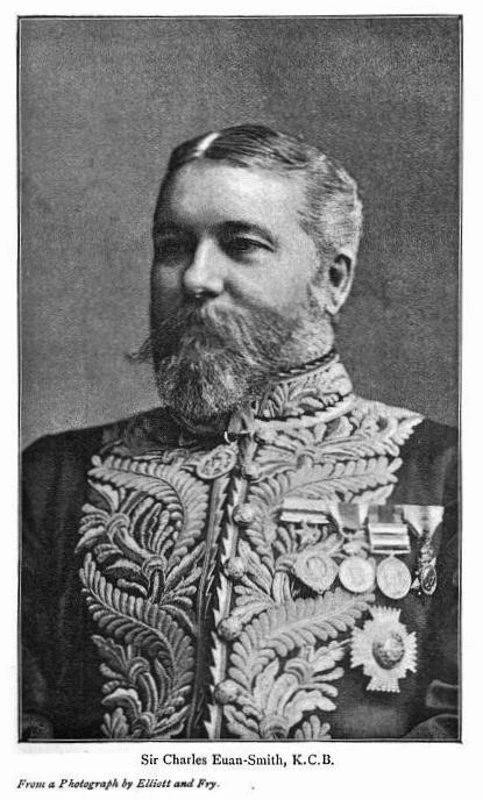
Sir Charles Euan-Smith

- Jul – Nov 1898: Sir Charles Euan-Smith
- 1898–1906: George Earle Welby
- 1906–1911: Francis William Stronge

==== Envoys extraordinary and ministers plenipotentiary ====
- 1911–1919: Percy Wyndham
- 1919–1923: Lord Herbert Hervey
- 1923–1926: William Seeds
- 1926–1930: Edmund Monson
- 1930–1936: Spencer Dickson
- 1936–1941: Montague Paske-Smith
- 1941–1944: Thomas Snow

=== Ambassadors extraordinary and plenipotentiary to Colombia ===
- 1944–1945: Thomas Snow
- 1945–1947: Philip Broadmead
- 1947–1953: Gilbert MacKereth
- 1953–1956: Keith Jopson
- 1956–1960: James Joint
- 1960–1964: Stanley Fordham
- 1964–1966: Sir Edgar Vaughan
- 1966–1970: William Young
- 1970–1973: Thomas Rogers
- 1973–1977: Geoffrey Crossley
- 1987–1990: Richard Neilson
- 1990–1994: Sir Keith Morris
- 1994–1998: Leycester Coltman
- 1998–2001: Jeremy Thorp
- 2001–2004: Sir Thomas Duggin
- 2004–2008: Haydon Warren-Gash
- 2008–2012: John Dew
- 2012–2015: Lindsay Croisdale-Appleby
- 2015–2019: Peter Tibber
- 2019–2022: Colin Martin-Reynolds
- 2022–present: George Hodgson
