= James Russell (law reporter) =

Scottish barrister

- Born: 1790
- Died: 6 January 1861 (aged 70–71); Roxeth House, near Harrow
- Burial place: Kensal Green
- Education: Glasgow University
- Occupation: barrister
- Known for: law reporter in English courts
- Notable work: Reports in Chancery
- Spouse(s): Maria, daughter of the Rev. Robert Cholmeley (m. 1839)
- Children: 3 sons, 5 daughters
- Father: James Russell of Stirling

James Russell (1790–1861) was a Scottish barrister, best known as a law reporter in the English courts.

== Life ==
He was the eldest son of James Russell of Stirling; his brother John joined the Scottish bar, and became known as a travel writer. After graduating with distinction at Glasgow University, he was called to the English bar at the Inner Temple in June 1822.

Henry Lascelles, 2nd Earl of Harewood introduced Russell to Lord Eldon, and he was appointed a reporter in the courts of the Lord Chancellor and Master of the Rolls. In 1824 he became sole authorised reporter, ceasing in 1834.

Russell gradually acquired a chancery and bankruptcy practice, and took silk in 1841. He ultimately became leader in the court of Vice-chancellor James Lewis Knight-Bruce, but his eyesight failed.

Russell for some years before his death was blind. He died at Roxeth House, near Harrow, on 6 January 1861, and was buried at Kensal Green.

== Works ==
Russell published:

- Reports in Chancery, 1826–8, 4 vols. and 2 parts, vol. v. 1827–30.
- With George James Turner, Reports in Chancery, 1822–4, 1832.
- With James William Mylne, Reports in Chancery, 1829–31, with particular cases in 1832–3, 2 vols., 1832–7.

All these works were reprinted in America. Russell also contributed to the Quarterly Review, and with his brother John for some years edited the Annual Register.

== Family ==
Russell married, in April 1839, Maria, eldest daughter of the Rev. Robert Cholmeley, rector of Wainfleet, Lincolnshire, with whom he had three sons and five daughters.

== Notes ==
Attribution

This article incorporates text from a publication now in the public domain: Lee, Sidney, ed. (1897). "Russell, James (1790-1861)". Dictionary of National Biography. Vol. 49. London: Smith, Elder & Co.
