= William Turner (envoy) =

British diplomat and author

- Born: 5 September 1792; Yarmouth
- Died: 10 January 1867 (aged 74); Leamington
- Resting place: Birstall, Leicestershire
- Occupation: Diplomat
- Notable work: Journal of a Tour in the Levant (1820)
- Spouse: Mary Anne Mansfield
- Children: Mansfield (d. 1901); Mary Anne Elizabeth (1825–1894)
- Relatives: Sir George James Turner

William Turner (5 September 1792 – 10 January 1867) was a British diplomat and author.

== Early life ==
Turner was born at Yarmouth on 5 September 1792, the son of Richard Turner (1751–1835)—lecturer, and afterwards perpetual curate of Great Yarmouth—by his second wife, Elizabeth (1761–1805), eldest daughter of Thomas Rede of Beccles. Sir George James Turner was his younger brother. On 10 April 1824, at St George's, Hanover Square, he married Mary Anne (1797–1891), daughter and coheir of John Mansfield of Birstall. By her he had one surviving son, Mansfield, and a daughter, Mary Anne Elizabeth (1825–1894), who married Walter Stewart Broadwood.

== Career ==
Turner's father, Richard, was a friend of George Canning, who gave William a post in the Foreign Office. In 1811 he was attached to the embassy of Sir Robert Liston, and accompanied him to Constantinople. He remained in the East for five years, and during that time visited most parts of the Ottoman Empire, as well as the islands and mainland of Greece. While in Asia Minor he endeavoured to emulate Leander and Lord Byron by swimming the Hellespont, and, failing in the attempt, palliated his ill-success by pointing out that he tried to swim from Asia to Europe, a far more difficult feat than Lord Byron's passage from Europe to Asia. Byron replied in a letter to John Murray published at the time, and Turner, in a counter rejoinder, overwhelmed his adversary with quotations from ancient and modern topographers. He published the results of his wanderings in 1820 under the title Journal of a Tour in the Levant.

In 1824 Turner returned to Constantinople as secretary to the British embassy. During the absence of an ambassador, due to the removal of Lord Strangford to Saint Petersburg, Turner filled the office of minister plenipotentiary. On 22 October 1829 he was appointed Envoy Extraordinary and Minister Plenipotentiary to the Republic of Colombia, and after filling that post for nine years he retired from the service.

== Death and legacy ==
Turner died at Leamington on 10 January 1867, and was buried in the vault of the parish church of Birstall. A brass was erected in his memory on the north wall of the chancel.

Turner amassed a large collection of ancient coins through his travels. On his death, the collection passed to his son, Mansfield Turner (d. 1901), and continued to be passed on through the family until 1987.
