= Francis Rundall =

British diplomat

Sir Francis Rundall GCMG OBE

British Ambassador to Japan
- In office 1963–1967
- Monarch: Elizabeth II
- Prime Minister: Alec Douglas-Home; Harold Wilson
- Preceded by: Oscar Morland
- Succeeded by: John Arthur Pilcher

British Ambassador to Israel
- In office 1957–1959
- Monarch: Elizabeth II
- Prime Minister: Harold Macmillan
- Preceded by: John Walter Nicholls
- Succeeded by: Patrick Hancock

Her Majesty's Consul-General in New York
- In office 1953–1957
- Monarch: Elizabeth II
- Prime Minister: Winston Churchill; Anthony Eden
- Preceded by: Henry Hobson
- Succeeded by: Hugh Stephenson

Personal details
- Born: 11 September 1908 Kent, England
- Died: 7 July 1987 (aged 78)
- Spouse: Mary Syrett (m. 1935)
- Education: Marlborough College
- Alma mater: University of Cambridge; University of Berlin

Sir Francis Brian Anthony Rundall GCMG OBE (11 September 1908 – 7 July 1987) was a British diplomat. He served as British Ambassador to Israel from 1957 to 1959 and British Ambassador to Japan from 1963 to 1967.

== Early life ==
Rundall was born in Kent, England on 11 September 1908. He was educated at Marlborough College, followed by the University of Cambridge and the University of Berlin.

== Career ==
Rundall entered the Diplomatic Service in 1930 as a consular officer. He subsequently served as Head of the North American Department of the Foreign Office from 1947 to 1948, Head of the United Nations (Economic and Social) Department and Refugee Department of the Foreign Office from 1948 to 1949, an inspector from 1949 to 1953, New York Consul-General from 1953 to 1957, Ambassador to Israel from 1957 to 1959, Deputy Under-Secretary for Foreign Affairs and Chief Clerk from 1959 to 1963 and Ambassador to Japan from 1963 to 1967.

He was appointed a GCMG on 1 January 1968.

== Personal life ==
Rundall married Mary Syrett on 26 January 1935. His hobby was trout fishing. By 1956 he lived at 1 Beekman Place in New York and had two children being schooled in England. He died on 7 July 1987.

Diplomatic posts
Preceded by Sir Henry Hobson	Her Majesty's Consul-General in New York; 1953–1957	Succeeded by Sir Hugh Stephenson
Preceded by Sir John Nicholls	British Ambassador to Israel; 1957–1959	Succeeded by Patrick Hancock
Preceded by Sir Oscar Morland	British Ambassador to Japan; 1963–1967	Succeeded by Sir John Arthur Pilcher
