= John Kingman (businessman) =

British businessman and civil servant (born 1969)

Sir John Kingman KCB, FRS, FMedSci
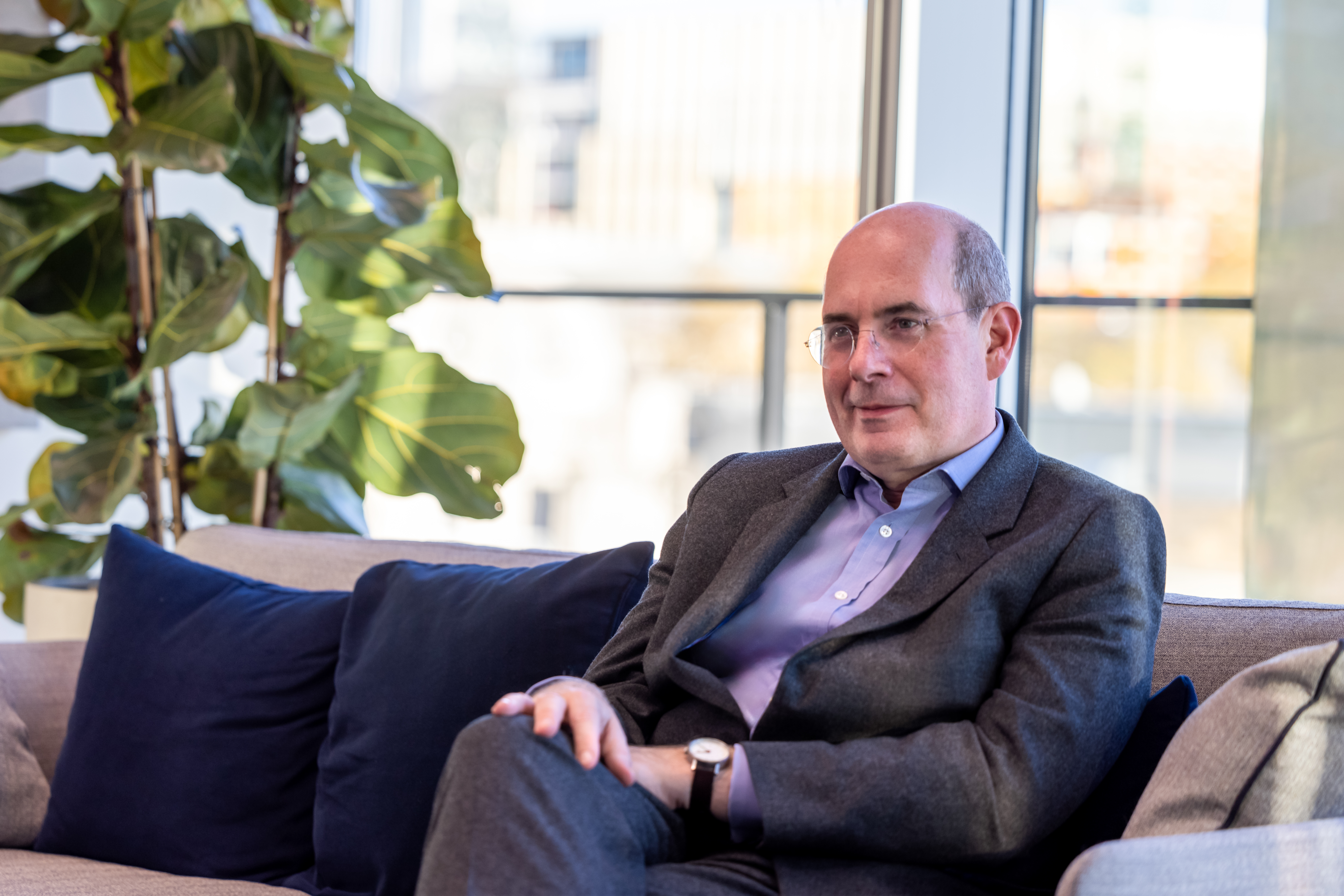
- Kingman in 2024
- Born: April 24, 1969 (age 57)
- Education: St John's College, Oxford
- Occupations: Business executive and former civil servant
- Years active: 1990–present
- Employer: Barclays UK
- Title: Chairman

Sir John Oliver Frank Kingman (born 24 April 1969) is a British businessman and former civil servant. On 16 October 2026, he was appointed as the chair of Great British Railways.

He is also Chair of Barclays UK, the ring-fenced retail bank of Barclays PLC, and a member of the Barclays PLC board.

He was Chair of Legal & General Group PLC from 2016 to 2026.

He has served as Deputy Chairman of the National Gallery since 3 April 2017, and has twice acted as Interim Chair.

He is a former Second Permanent Secretary to HM Treasury.

From 2016 to 2021, he was the first Chair of UK Research and Innovation, which oversees Government science and innovation funding of about £8bn a year. He was awarded a knighthood in 2016 for his public services, particularly to the economy, and is also an Honorary Fellow of the Royal Society and the Academy of Medical Sciences.

In April 2018, Kingman was appointed by the UK Government to lead an independent review of the Financial Reporting Council. Published in December 2018, the report was highly critical of the FRC, recommending replacing the regulator with the Audit, Reporting and Governance Authority.

He previously served as a member of the UK Government’s Industrial Strategy Advisory Council.

== Education ==
He was a Queen's Scholar at Westminster School and a Casberd Scholar at St John's College, Oxford, where he took a first-class degree in Modern History; he is now an Honorary Fellow of St John's College.

== Career ==
Early in his career (1995–1997) Kingman was a Financial Times Lex columnist. He also worked in the Chief Executive's office at BP from 1997 to 1998.

Kingman was closely involved with the response to the 2007–2009 financial crisis. He handled nationalisation of Northern Rock, and led negotiations with RBS, Lloyds and HBOS on their £37bn recapitalisation. He was the first chief executive of UK Financial Investments, which managed the Government's bank shareholdings.

While at the Treasury, Kingman was responsible for selling £16bn of Lloyds shares, the first RBS share sale, and the largest-ever UK privatisation (£13bn of mortgage assets). Kingman led on liberalising the annuity market and creating the National Infrastructure Commission; he negotiated Greater Manchester's devolution deal, introducing an elected Mayor. Earlier, he was responsible for a fundamental overhaul of the UK competition regime (2001 Enterprise Act), and introducing the Highly Skilled Migrants' Programme. He was particularly involved with science funding, working on five spending reviews that prioritised science, and in 2004 led the cross-Government ten-year Science and Innovation Framework. From 2003 to 2006, he was a board Director of the European Investment Bank.

From 2010 to 2012, Kingman was Global Co-Head of the Financial Institutions Group at Rothschild.

== Affiliations ==
Kingman is a World Fellow of Yale University and a Visiting Fellow of Nuffield College, Oxford. He was a Trustee of the Royal Opera House from 2014 to 2021, and has been a member of the Prime Minister's Council for Science and Technology, the Trilateral Commission, the Global Advisory Committee for the Oxford University Centre for Corporate Reputation, and the Development Board for the £37-million renewal of St Martin-in-the-Fields. He chaired the judges for the 2017 Wolfson Economics Prize.

== Personal life ==
Kingman is the son of the mathematician Sir John Frank Charles Kingman.

Government offices
Preceded by Sir Jonathan Stephens as Managing Director, Public Services and Growth	Managing Director, Public Services and Growth, & Second Permanent Secretary; HM Treasury; 2007–2008	Succeeded by Tom Scholar
New title	Chief Executive, UK Financial Investments; 2008–2009	Succeeded by Robin Budenberg
Preceded by Sharon White	Second Permanent Secretary, HM Treasury; 2015–2016	Succeeded by Charles Roxburgh
