= Embassy of the United Kingdom, Prague =

British Embassy in Prague
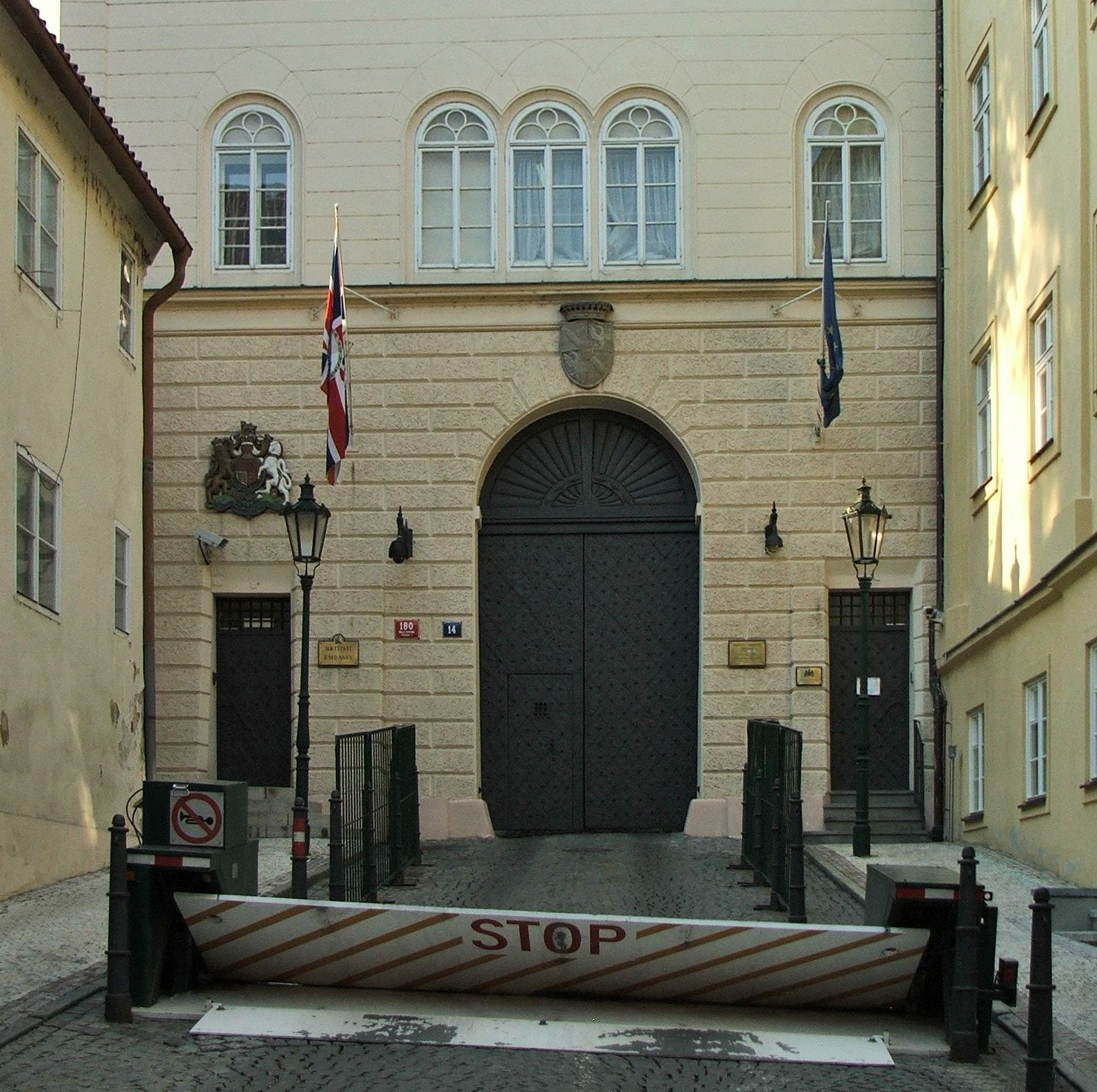
- Location: Prague, Czech Republic
- Address: Thunovska 14; 118 00; Prague 1
- Coordinates: 50.089693°N 14.402846°E
- Ambassador: Matt Field
- Website: Official website

The British Embassy in Prague (Czech: Britské velvyslanectví v Praze) is the chief diplomatic mission of the United Kingdom in the Czech Republic. It is located in the Thun Palace, a historic building in the heart of the Malá Strana ("Lesser Town"). The incumbent ambassador is Matt Field.

== History ==
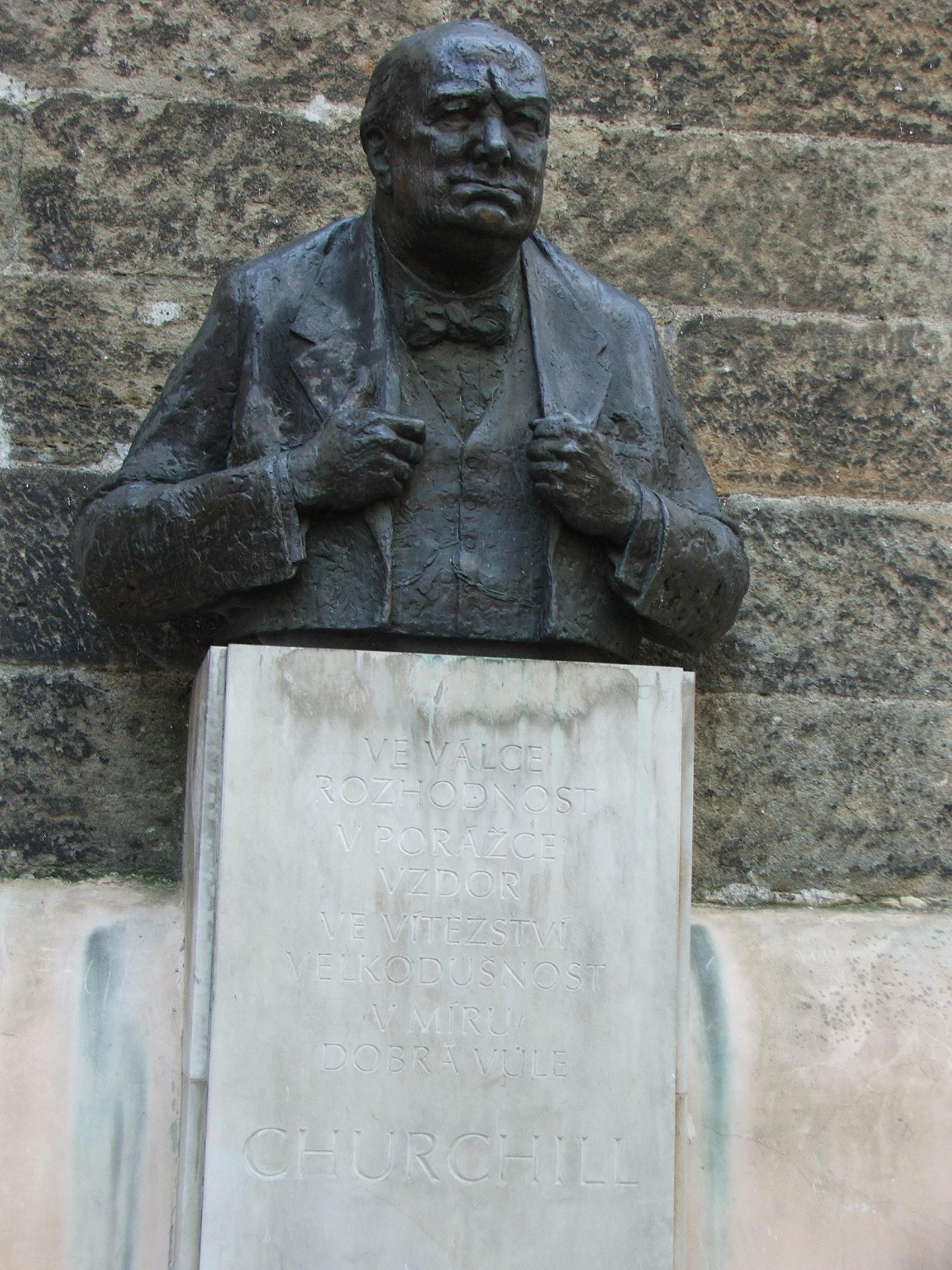
A bust of Winston Churchill close to the British Embassy in Prague

The long history of the Thun Palace, which is named after the Thun family, goes back to medieval times and there are Gothic traces in the cellars and foundations of the building. The first written record of a building at this place is from the middle of the 14th century. Since then, the location has marked some of the great events in Czech history. There are records that a house here was burnt during the Hussite Wars, along with much of Malá Strana. Holy Roman Emperor Rudolf II bequeathed a rebuilt house to one of his faithful servants, and the house was subsequently traded by winners and losers during the catastrophic upheavals of the Thirty Years' War.

In 1919, when Britain established relations with the new Republic of Czechoslovakia, the British leased the Thun Palace as a Residence for the Minister and the Legation offices. It has been the Legation, and then the Embassy, ever since and in 1925 the British Government bought it. The first Czechoslovak President, Tomáš Masaryk, was a frequent visitor and according to some sources, Masaryk used to come from the Prague Castle through the Embassy garden. Over the years, many internal changes to the building have been made to provide more working office space. But the main architectural features, artwork and great treasures of history remain, and the building and garden continue to be amongst the most beautiful locations in the city.

The American musicologist Daniel E. Freeman has recently established that Mozart did not stay in this palace during his first visit in Prague in January and February 1787, contrary to persistent claims found in guidebooks to the city of Prague. The true Thun palace in which he stayed burned down in the late 1790s. It was replaced by a new palace that was built in the early 19th century and now stands at Sněmovní 4 in Malá Strana.

== See also ==
- Czech Republic–United Kingdom relations
- List of ambassadors of the United Kingdom to the Czech Republic
- Diplomatic missions in the Czech Republic
