= Dominic Jermey =

British diplomat

His Excellency Dominic Jermey CVO OBE
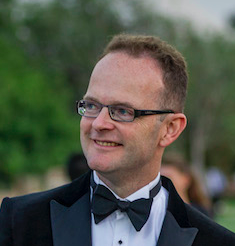

British Ambassador to Indonesia
- Incumbent
- Assumed office 2023
- Monarch: Charles III
- Prime Minister: Rishi Sunak; Keir Starmer
- Preceded by: Owen Jenkins

British Ambassador to Afghanistan
- In office 2016–2017
- Monarch: Elizabeth II
- Prime Minister: Theresa May
- Preceded by: Dame Karen Pierce
- Succeeded by: Sir Nicholas Kay
- In office 2014–2015
- Monarch: Elizabeth II
- Prime Minister: David Cameron
- Succeeded by: Catherine Raines

British Ambassador to the United Arab Emirates
- In office 2010–2014
- Monarch: Elizabeth II
- Prime Minister: David Cameron
- Preceded by: Edward Oakden
- Succeeded by: Philip Parham

Personal details
- Born: Dominic James Robert Jermey; 26 April 1967 (age 59)
- Children: 2, including Elizabeth Jermey
- Education: Tonbridge School
- Alma mater: Clare College, Cambridge

Dominic James Robert Jermey CVO OBE (born 26 April 1967) is a British diplomat who is currently the British Ambassador to Indonesia. His immediately previous position was Director-General of the Zoological Society of London. He served as British Ambassador to Afghanistan from 2016 to 2017.

== Early life and work ==
Jermey was educated at Tonbridge School and then Clare College, Cambridge, before working at J. H. Schroder Wagg & Co. in corporate finance in 1990.

== Consular career ==
Joining the Foreign and Commonwealth Office in 1993, Jermey served in London in the European Union Department, at the Embassy in Islamabad, in East Timor liaising with the United Nations, and in London at the United Nations Department, before in 2001 becoming the interim Chargé d’Affaires at the new British office in Kabul. Jermey was appointed an Officer of the Order of the British Empire in 2001.

Following Kabul, after some time working in consular affairs, Jermey moved to work at UK Trade & Investment. He did this first in 2004 as Deputy Head of Mission in Madrid and UKTI Director there, interrupted by a two-month return to consular work to head the team at the British Embassy in Thailand following the 2004 Indian Ocean earthquake and tsunami. After Madrid, in 2007 Jermey served as UKTI's Managing Director for the Sectors Group, including briefly as head of their Defence and Security Organisation in 2008, and as the acting Chief Executive in 2009.

In 2010, Jermey was appointed Her Majesty's Ambassador to the United Arab Emirates, based in Abu Dhabi, succeeding Edward Oakden. Jermey was appointed as a Commander of the Royal Victorian Order in November 2010 following the state visit of Elizabeth II to the UAE.

Following his tour there, Jermey was replaced by Philip Parham and was appointed as the Chief Executive of UK Trade & Investment in 2014. The next year he was poached by the Foreign Office to be their new International Counter-Extremism Coordinator, and was replaced by Dr. Catherine Raines.

After a year working on Counter-Extremism, Jermey was again appointed ambassador, this time back to Kabul as Her Majesty's Ambassador to Afghanistan in 2016, succeeding Dame Karen Pierce. At the end of the next year, Jermey was replaced by Sir Nicholas Kay and took up his appointment at ZSL following on from the 13-year tenure of Ralph Armond.

Diplomatic posts
Preceded by Edward Oakden	British Ambassador to the United Arab Emirates; 2010–2014	Succeeded by Philip Parham
Preceded by	British Ambassador to Afghanistan; 2014–2015	Succeeded by Catherine Raines
Preceded by Dame Karen Pierce	British Ambassador to Afghanistan; 2016–2017	Succeeded by Sir Nicholas Kay
