= Augustus Henry Mounsey =

British diplomat (1834–1882)

- Born: Augustus Henry Mounsey; 27 August 1834
- Died: 10 April 1882 (aged 47)
- Occupation: Diplomat

Augustus Henry Mounsey (27 August 1834 – 10 April 1882) was a British diplomat. His firsthand account of the Japanese Satsuma Rebellion published in 1879 gives the most detailed descriptions of the military campaigns of the rebellion.

== Life ==
Augustus Henry Mounsey was the fourth son of George Gill Mounsey of Castletown House near Carlisle, Cumberland. Mounsey entered Rugby School in 1849 and completed his schooling there.

Mounsey started his diplomatic career in Lisbon in 1857 and was promoted to Hanover in 1861 and to Vienna in 1862.

In November 1865 Mounsey set off on a journey to Persia. After the pogrom against the Jewish community of Barfurush in May 1866, Mounsey together with the British diplomat stationed in Tehran, Charles Alison was involved in the relief and protection efforts of the victims.

In 1873 Mounsey was appointed the Acting Consul General in Budapest and later the same in Paris in 1875.

Mounsey proceeded to become the Secretary of the British Legation in Yedo (Tokyo) on 10 February 1876 and on 22 July 1878 sent to Athens. From 1881 until his death he served as British Minister Resident and Consul General to Colombia.

Mounsey's The Satsuma Rebellion (1879), which chronicled the Satsuma Rebellion of 1877 and assassination of Ōkubo Toshimichi in 1877, was noted by Shigeno Yasutsugu for its deviation from the East Asian historiography through annalistic records and for its discussion beyond the immediate factors of the rebellion. The book gives the most detailed descriptions of the military campaigns of the rebellion.

== Publications ==
- Augustus Henry Mounsey (1872). A Journey Through the Caucasus and the Interior of Persia: With a Map. Smith, Elder & Company.
- Augustus Henry Mounsey (1879). The Satsuma Rebellion, an Episode of Modern Japanese History. J. Murray.
