= Charles Roxburgh =

British civil servant (born 1959)

Sir Charles Roxburgh KCB
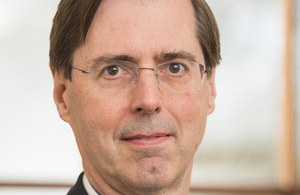
- Roxburgh in 2016

Second Permanent Secretary of HM Treasury
- In office 4 July 2016 – 30 June 2022
- Prime Minister: David Cameron; Theresa May; Boris Johnson
- Chancellor: George Osborne; Philip Hammond; Sajid Javid; Rishi Sunak
- Preceded by: John Kingman

Personal details
- Born: 25 October 1959 (age 66)
- Spouse: Dame Karen Pierce
- Children: 2
- Education: Stowe School
- Alma mater: Trinity College, Cambridge; Harvard University (MBA)

Sir Charles Fergusson Roxburgh (born 25 October 1959) is the current chairman of the global insurance marketplace Lloyd's of London and a former civil servant who was Second Permanent Secretary of HM Treasury from 2016 to 2022.

== Early life and career ==
Roxburgh was born on 25 October 1959 in London and educated at Stowe School. He obtained a degree in Classics from Trinity College, Cambridge. He graduated from Harvard Business School with a Master of Business Administration degree in 1986.

Roxburgh began his career at accountancy firm Arthur Andersen & Co in its Management Information Consulting Division.

== Career ==
Roxburgh worked at management consulting firm McKinsey & Co for 26 years, including as a senior partner. His roles included co-head of McKinsey's global strategy practice, head of the UK financial institutions group and co-leader of the global corporate and investment banking practice. He worked in McKinsey & Co's New York City financial institutions practice for seven years. In 2009 he became the London-based director of the McKinsey Global Institute, an in-house economics research unit. In 2011 he was elected to McKinsey & Co's global board.

Roxburgh joined HM Treasury in February 2013. He was Director General of Financial Services at the Treasury from 2013. He sat on the Financial Stability Board and represented the Treasury on the Bank of England's Financial Policy Committee. On 4 July 2016, he was appointed Second Permanent Secretary of the Treasury, overseeing its growth, financial services and infrastructure agendas. He worked on completing the Government's exit from its ownership of financial assets. He was involved in Brexit, and COVID-19 emergency schemes such as the Covid Corporate Financing Facility. He oversaw the creation of the UK Infrastructure Bank.

Roxburgh stood down as Second Permanent Secretary of the Treasury in 2022. He was succeeded by Cat Little and Beth Russell.

Roxburgh joined Lloyd's of London as Chair on 1 May 2025, succeeding Bruce Carnegie-Brown. He is also a non-executive board member of law firm Herbert Smith Freehill, and a non-executive director of Shell. Roxburgh served as non-executive Chairman of Legal & General America from March 2023 to February 2025.

== Personal life ==
Roxburgh is married to diplomat Dame Karen Pierce. They have two sons, born in 1991 and 1997.

== Honours ==
Roxburgh was appointed Knight Commander of the Order of the Bath (KCB) in the 2022 Birthday Honours for services to Government.

Government offices
Preceded by John Kingman	Second Permanent Secretary of HM Treasury; 2016–2022	Succeeded by Cat Little
Preceded by John Kingman	Second Permanent Secretary of HM Treasury; 2016–2022	Succeeded by Beth Russell
