= Bogotá Bracelet =

1970 incident

The Bogotá Bracelet incident took place in May 1970 when Bobby Moore, the captain of the England national football team, was detained in Colombia for four days after being accused of stealing a bracelet from a jewellery shop located in the Bogotá hotel in which the team were staying.

The arrest took place in the build-up to the World Cup Finals where England were to defend the cup they had won in 1966. It provoked widespread reaction in the United Kingdom, including a diplomatic intervention at the behest of the British Prime Minister Harold Wilson, and across the world in general.

On 28 May 1970, Moore was conditionally released and flew to join his teammates in Mexico, where he played in all of England's World Cup matches. The Colombian authorities concluded that Moore was innocent of any wrongdoing, but the case was not formally closed until 1972.

== Background ==
As part of their preparations for the World Cup being held in Mexico that summer, the England football team planned to play two friendly matches in South America to help them prepare for the high altitudes they would face once the tournament began.

They were scheduled to play first in Colombia, on 20 May 1970, and then in Ecuador on 24 May. England left their forward base in Mexico City on 18 May and arrived in the Colombian capital Bogotá, checking into the Hotel Tequendama.

== Incident ==
=== Alleged theft ===
Although the various accounts of the incident differ somewhat in exact details, the basic outline of what happened is all the same. Located near the foyer of the hotel was a gift shop selling jewellery, known as the Fuego Verde (Green Fire). A number of the English players visited the store at one point or another, browsing for gifts to take home. At 6:25pm, Moore went in with Bobby Charlton to look for a present for Charlton's wife. Team doctor Neil Phillips was also in the shop as at one point was Peter Thompson.

After looking at some of the items in the display cases, Moore and Charlton found nothing that interested them and left. They were standing in the foyer when the assistant in the shop, Clara Padilla, came out and accused them of stealing a valuable bracelet from a display case. Moore and Charlton protested their innocence and offered to allow themselves to be searched.

Despite their denials, Padilla repeatedly identified them as the culprits of the alleged theft. Soon tourist police and hotel staff were on hand, as were most of the English players. Doctor Phillips went to fetch Alf Ramsey. When he arrived, Ramsey took charge of the situation and spoke to the authorities. Moore and Charlton were briefly questioned, and made an official statement.

This appeared to be the end of the matter, and they even received apologies for the inconvenience. The match against Colombia went ahead, and England won the game 4–0, with Moore and Charlton both playing. By a gentlemen's agreement, the travelling British sports journalists agreed not to mention the incident.

=== Arrest ===
After their win in Bogotá, England then proceeded on to their match against Ecuador in Quito and won 2–0 there. England were scheduled to fly back to Mexico City via Bogotá, where there would be a four and a half hour stopover. Neil Phillips suggested that to avoid any further problems they should take an alternative route via Panama City. Both Ramsey and Moore rejected this idea, as they felt it would indicate wrongdoing, and England took their arranged flight back to Bogotá.

They checked into the same hotel where the bracelet incident had taken place. To fill the time up while they waited for their flight the team sat down to watch the film Shenandoah. As they were sitting there two plainclothed Colombian police officers quietly took Moore out and formally arrested him for theft.

The Colombian police acted after a new witness, Álvaro Suárez, came forward, claiming to have seen Moore take the bracelet. Only lobbying by the British ambassador had stopped Moore from being arrested at the airport in front of cameras. Suarez said he saw what happened through the shop window and supported the version of Clara Padilla.

As it became clear that Moore might be detained for some time, Ramsey decided that, with the start of the World Cup just a few days away, he had to go on to Mexico without his captain. Two FA officials remained in Bogotá to assist Moore, and further help was provided by British Embassy officials.

Neither Bobby Charlton nor Peter Thompson were arrested, despite their presence in the shop at the time of the incident, and they left the hotel along with the rest of the squad and boarded the plane. Many of the other players had not noticed or realised the significance of Moore's absence, as he was often called away to do interviews or meet people. Once they had taken off, Ramsey explained what had happened to the players, staff and press.

The public relations problems of the English were further complicated when Jeff Astle, who hated flying, allegedly had several drinks to calm his nerves. Astle was extremely intoxicated once they reached Mexico City and had to be helped along by his teammates. This led one Mexican newspaper to brand the English as "a team of drunks and thieves".

=== Detention ===
Moore was held in a room in the Bogotá police headquarters while his fate was decided. He was ultimately charged and faced with prosecution for theft. In light of the special circumstances, it was arranged that, rather than be sent to one of the city's prisons, Moore was kept under house arrest at Director of the Colombian Football Federation Alfonso Senior's residence. He was allowed to train so he could maintain his fitness, but was constantly followed by armed police guards. In press reports, there was initially some confusion about the fact that the alleged theft and Moore's arrest had taken place several days apart.

The arrest sparked international media attention. Interest in the incident was stoked by the fact that Moore was a particularly well-known footballer generally respected throughout the game. In Britain there was massive press interest in Moore's wife Tina, who was shortly due to go out and watch England play in Mexico, and she was followed by a crowd of journalists wherever she went.

Moore was generally perceived to be innocent. Ramsey expressed his own belief in his captain. "I should have thought that the integrity of this man would be enough to answer these charges. It is too ridiculous for words". The former Brazil coach João Saldanha observed that when he had stayed at the hotel with his team Botafogo they had experienced a similar incident – in which jewellery had been hidden on them and money demanded in order to avoid a scandal. Saldanha described the allegations against Moore as "disgraceful" and "slander".

In the England camp, many players considered the charge ridiculous and treated it as a joke. Ramsey was more concerned as the matter disrupted his carefully planned preparations for the World Cup, and made a contingency plan to play Norman Hunter in Moore's central defensive role and make Alan Mullery the team's captain. He was facing up to the possibility that he might lose Moore for the entire tournament.

In Bogotá, Moore was taken before judge Peter Dorado and questioned for four hours. He denied any knowledge about the theft or even seeing the bracelet in question. Confused by the conflicting claims, Justice Dorado arranged for the authorities to stage a re-enactment of the incident with Moore and Padilla. Her version was undermined as she claimed that Moore had slipped the bracelet into the left-hand pocket of his blazer, and it was demonstrated that the blazer had no pocket on the left side. She then changed various parts of her story and eventually left in tears. It was also questioned why the fresh witness, Alvaro Suarez, waited four days to come forward. There were also conflicting suggestions about the value of the bracelet. Initially it was said to be valued around £500, but later it is claimed to be worth £5,000, while the owner of the shop requested £6,000 in compensation. As Moore was driven back from the re-enactment, cries of "Viva Bobby" could be heard from the streets.

Harold Wilson hoped that a strong performance by England at the World Cup would boost the chances of his governing Labour Party being re-elected in the 1970 General Election. Wilson was so concerned by Moore's arrest that he requested repeated lobbying of the Colombian government by the British embassy in Bogotá. The Colombians were wary of creating what was fast becoming a diplomatic incident.

=== Release ===
On 28 May 1970, Moore was taken before Justice Dorado and told there was insufficient evidence for a prosecution and he was to be set free. Moore released a statement "I am happy to be set free and the allegations against me turned out to be groundless". He promised to further co-operate with the Colombian authorities and thanked the Colombian people "for the many expressions of sympathy and support which I have received from them in the last few days".

Moore was given a conditional release that required him to report to the Colombian consulate in Mexico, although this was abandoned soon afterwards, with an official stating "It was an accusation that needed proof. "It was never proved. Moore has no obligation with the embassy. There was never much case".

Moore arrived in Mexico City and then flew on to Guadalajara, where the English were preparing to play their opening match against Romania on 2 June. He was greeted warmly at the airport by Ramsey. Moore was taken back to the England team hotel where he was greeted by the other players lined up in a guard of honour to applaud him. On 2 June he captained England to a 1–0 victory against Romania.

== Aftermath ==
England went out of the World Cup quarter-finals after Gerd Müller's extra-time goal sealed their 3–2 defeat to West Germany. Moore was widely praised for his performances in Mexico, especially in England's group stage match against Brazil. Ramsey later told a journalist that the incident had been the "worst thing" that ever happened to him in all his years of football.

In October 1970, the Colombian authorities re-opened the case but could find nothing to prove there had ever been a theft. Moore and Charlton had to attend a hearing at Bow Street Magistrates' Court, after which the case was formally closed in 1972. Despite being cleared, the incident continued to haunt Moore and has been suggested as a major reason why he was never awarded a knighthood. The Fuego Verde shop closed soon afterwards, and Clara Padilla ended up fleeing to the United States.

A general consensus exists that the incident was an attempted frame-up, either to try to secure money from the England camp or possibly to have Moore ruled out of the World Cup, weakening England's chances of winning it.

== Bibliography ==
- Bowler, Dave. Three Lions On the Shirt: Playing for England. Orion Books, 2000.
- Dawson, Jeff. Back Home: England and the 1970 World Cup. Orion Books, 2002.
- McKinstry, Leo. Sir Alf: A Major Reappraisal of the Life and Times of England's Greatest Football Manager. HarperSport, 2006.
- Powell, Jeff. Bobby Moore: The Life and Times of a Sporting Hero. Robson Books, 2005.
