= Dermot MacDermot =

Sir Dermot MacDermot KCMG CBE (1906–1989), styled Prince of Coolavin, Chief of the Name, head of the MacDermot clan, and a descendant of the Kings of Moylurg.

MacDermot attended Stonyhurst College, and went on to Trinity College Dublin, where he was elected a Scholar.

Sir Dermot MacDermot served as British Ambassador to Indonesia (1956–59) and Thailand (1961–65). He succeeded his brother as The MacDermot upon the latter's death in 1979. He wrote an account of the family titled "MacDermot of Moylurg: The Story of a Connacht Family". The book chronicles the affairs of the Kings of Moylurg and their neighbours over the course of six hundred years.

== See also ==
- Chiefs of the Name
- Kings of Moylurg

== Notes ==
Preceded by Charles John MacDermot	Prince of Coolavin; 1979–1989	Succeeded by Niall Anthony MacDermot
