= Karen Pierce =

British diplomat (born 1959)

Dame Karen Pierce DCMG
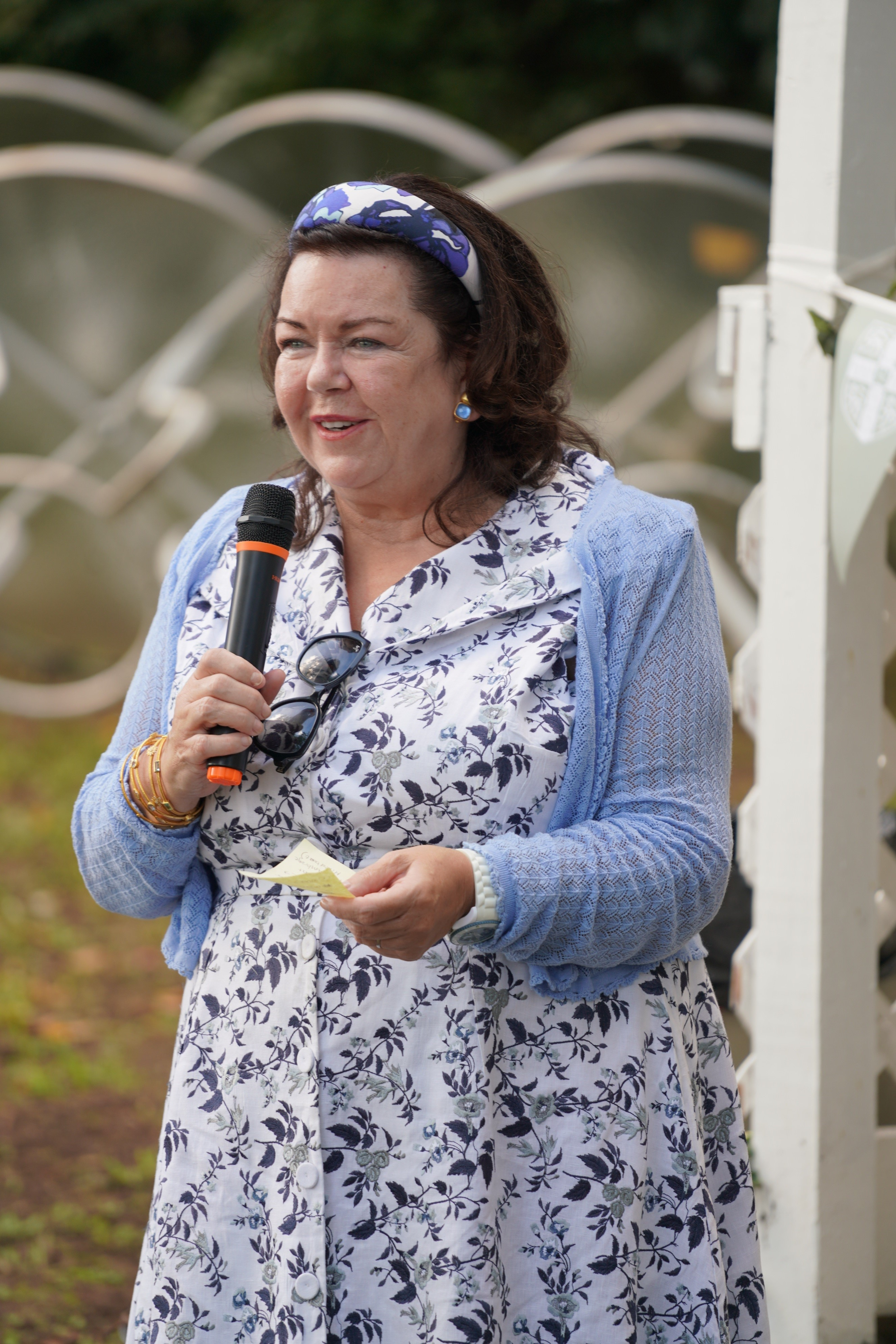
- Pierce in 2024

British Ambassador to the United States
- In office 23 March 2020 – 2 February 2025
- Monarchs: Elizabeth II; Charles III
- Prime Minister: Boris Johnson; Liz Truss; Rishi Sunak; Keir Starmer
- Preceded by: Kim Darroch
- Succeeded by: Peter Mandelson

Permanent Representative of the United Kingdom to the United Nations
- In office 23 March 2018 – 23 March 2020
- Monarch: Elizabeth II
- Prime Minister: Theresa May; Boris Johnson
- Preceded by: Matthew Rycroft
- Succeeded by: Dame Barbara Woodward

British Ambassador to Afghanistan
- In office 1 May 2015 – 29 February 2016
- Monarch: Elizabeth II
- Prime Minister: David Cameron
- Preceded by: Richard Stagg
- Succeeded by: Dominic Jermey

Permanent Representative of the United Kingdom to the UN in Geneva and WTO
- In office 8 May 2012 – 14 April 2015
- Monarch: Elizabeth II
- Prime Minister: David Cameron
- Preceded by: Peter Gooderham
- Succeeded by: Julian Braithwaite

Personal details
- Born: Karen Elizabeth Pierce; 23 September 1959 (age 66) Preston, Lancashire, England
- Spouse: Charles Roxburgh
- Children: 2
- Education: Penwortham Girls' High School
- Alma mater: Girton College, Cambridge (BA); London School of Economics (MSc)
- Occupation: Diplomat

Dame Karen Elizabeth Pierce DCMG (born 23 September 1959) is a British diplomat and senior civil servant who most recently served as the British Ambassador to the United States from 2020 to 2025.

She was previously the Permanent Representative of the United Kingdom to the United Nations from 2018 to 2020 and the British Ambassador to Afghanistan from 2015 to 2016. She was the first woman appointed to the United States and United Nations roles, and the second in the Afghanistan role.

== Early life and education ==
Pierce was born in Preston, Lancashire, where her grandparents were mill workers. Her father was an architectural draughtsman, and her mother was a secretary.

After attending Penwortham Girls' High School, a grammar school in Lancashire, she continued her studies at Girton College, Cambridge, where she received a Bachelor of Arts degree in English. In 2012, she was awarded a Master of Science degree in international strategy and diplomacy from the London School of Economics.

== Career ==
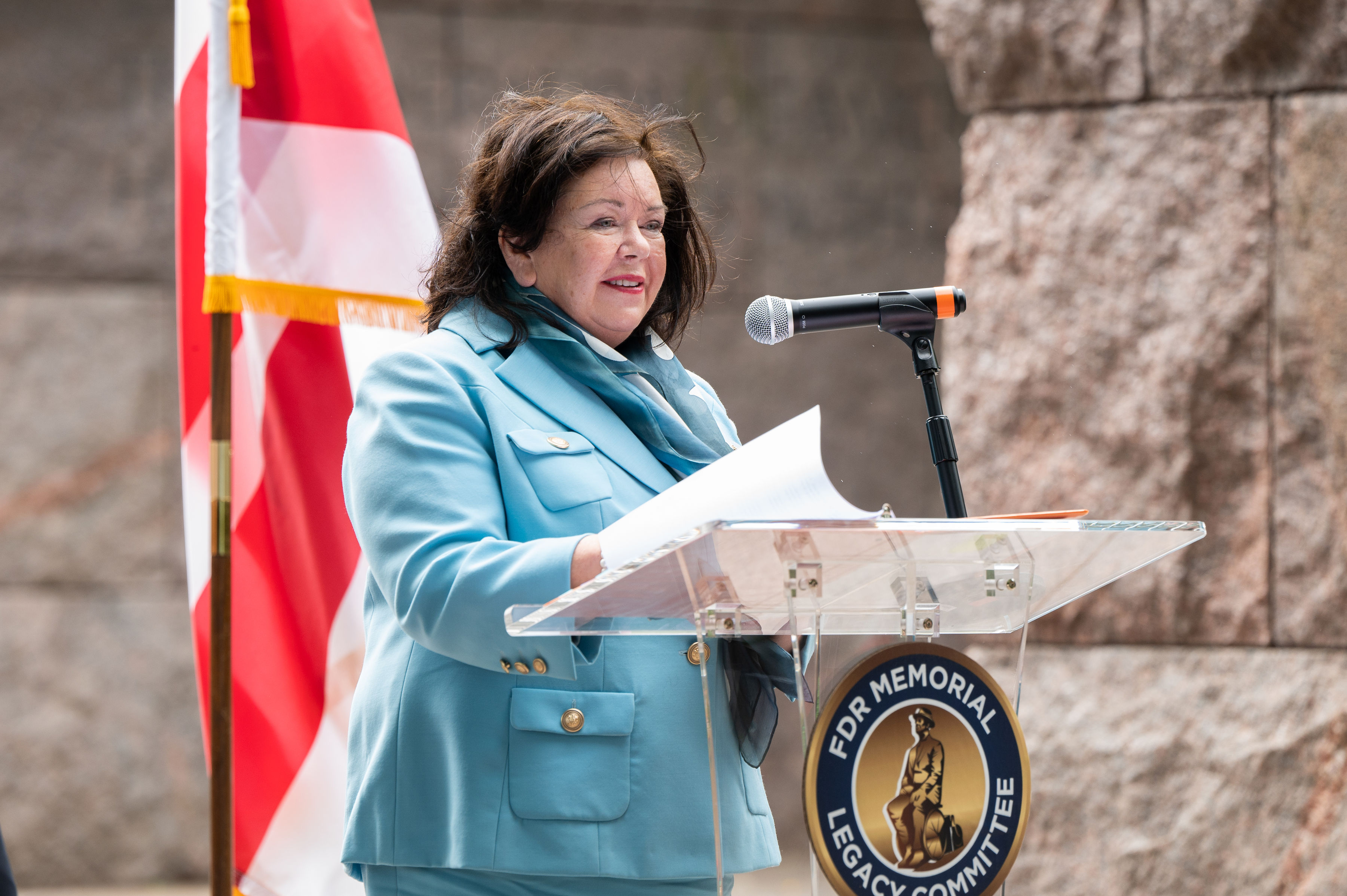
Pierce speaking at the Franklin Delano Roosevelt Memorial anniversary in Washington, D.C., in 2022

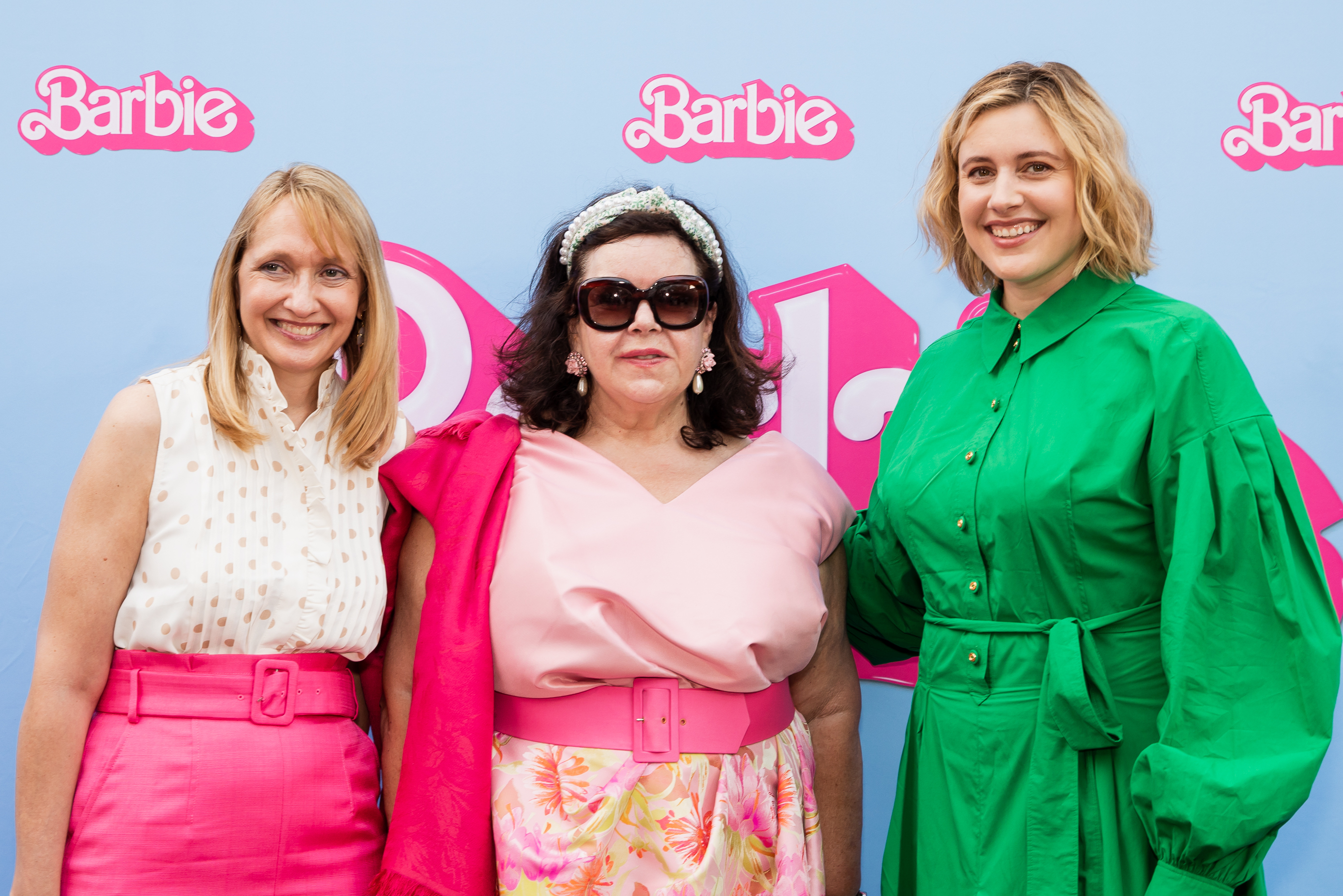
Pierce and film director Greta Gerwig at an event for Barbie in 2023

Pierce joined the Foreign and Commonwealth Office (FCO) in 1981, inspired by Margaret Thatcher's victory in the 1979 general election, which demonstrated to Pierce that women could "reach the top". After studying Japanese, she was posted to Tokyo in 1984. In 1987, she returned to London and joined the FCO's Security Policy Department. From 1992 to 1995, she worked in Washington, D.C., as Private Secretary to the British Ambassador to the United States, Robin Renwick. She held various positions at the FCO between 1996 and 2000, including Team Leader for Ukraine, Belarus and Moldova (1996−1997), Deputy Head of the Eastern Adriatic (Balkans) Department (1997−1999) and Head of the FCO Newsroom (1999−2000).

From 2006 to 2009, Pierce was the UK's Deputy Permanent Representative to the United Nations in New York. In this capacity, she acted as the President of the UN Security Council in April 2007 and in May 2008. From 2009 to 2012, she was Director for South Asia and Afghanistan at the FCO, acting as the UK Special Representative for Afghanistan and Pakistan from June 2010 to June 2011.

From 2012 to 2015, Pierce was posted to Geneva as the UK's Permanent Representative to the United Nations and other international organisations there. From May 2015 to February 2016 she was the British Ambassador to Afghanistan, the second woman to serve in that role. Until early 2018, she served as the FCO's Director General Political.

In March 2018, Pierce became the Permanent Representative of the United Kingdom to the United Nations in New York, the first woman to take on the role. During this time, Britain coordinated the Security Council's activities on Myanmar.

In 2020, Pierce moved to Washington, D.C., after being appointed as Britain's first female ambassador to the United States. On 7 November 2024, following the 2024 United States presidential election, the Chancellor of the Duchy of Lancaster, Pat McFadden, announced that Pierce was doing "an excellent job" as ambassador, with the "full confidence of the British government", and would remain in Washington until after Donald Trump's inauguration in January 2025. Pierce is considered broadly popular across the political spectrum in the United States, with senior Republican campaign adviser Chris LaCivita, the co-campaign manager during Donald Trump's victorious 2024 presidential campaign, describing her as "professional, universally-respected" and bemoaning her replacement. Trump had told Starmer he wanted to keep Pierce in place according to the Sunday Times.

Known for her flamboyance and colourful outfits, Pierce has made regular appearances on Fox News and other US media.

On 20 December 2024, Prime Minister Sir Keir Starmer announced the appointment of Peter Mandelson to be the next British Ambassador to the United States of America. He took up the position on 10 February 2025. In February 2025, Pierce was named as the Prime Minister's Special Envoy to the Western Balkans.

== Personal life ==
Pierce is married to Sir Charles Roxburgh, whom she met at the University of Cambridge and with whom she has two sons. Roxburgh was Second Permanent Secretary of the UK Treasury from 2016 until 2022, when he was made a Knight Commander of the Order of the Bath, at which point Pierce became Lady Roxburgh, although she does not use the title professionally.

== Honours ==
Pierce was appointed Dame Commander of the Order of St Michael and St George (DCMG) in the 2018 Birthday Honours. She was appointed Registrar of the Order in November 2025.

Diplomatic posts
Preceded by Peter Gooderham	British Permanent Representative to the United Nations in Geneva; 2012–2015	Succeeded by Julian Braithwaite
Preceded by Sir Richard Stagg	British Ambassador to Afghanistan; 2015–2016	Succeeded by Dominic Jermey
Preceded by Matthew Rycroft	British Permanent Representative to the United Nations; 2018–2020	Succeeded by Dame Barbara Woodward
Preceded by Kim Darroch	British Ambassador to the United States; 2020–2025	Succeeded by Peter Mandelson
