= Owen Jenkins (diplomat) =

British diplomat (born 1969)

Owen Jenkins CMG
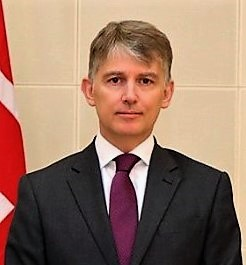

British Ambassador to Indonesia and East Timor
- In office July 2019 – July 2023
- Monarchs: Elizabeth II; Charles III
- Prime Minister: Theresa May; Boris Johnson; Liz Truss; Rishi Sunak
- Preceded by: Moazzam Malik
- Succeeded by: Dominic Jermey

Owen John Jenkins CMG (born 21 August 1969) is a British diplomat who was the British Ambassador to Indonesia and East Timor.

== Career ==
Jenkins is the son of Sir Christopher Jenkins and was educated at Highgate School and the University of Sheffield where he gained first class honours in English Literature.

He joined the Foreign Office in 1991 and has served in Ankara from 1994 to 1997, Buenos Aires 2002–06, Brussels 2006-09 and New Delhi 2009–12. After his appointment as UK Special Representative for Afghanistan and Pakistan from 2015 to 2017 he was seconded in 2018 to Aberdeen Standard Life.

Jenkins, who is married with two sons and a daughter, has promoted Women's rights in Indonesia.

In April 2020, Jenkins urged Climate Action during the COVID-19 pandemic in Indonesia.

As ambassador, he paid his condolences after the disappearance of KRI Nanggala (402).

Jenkins was appointed Companion of the Order of St Michael and St George (CMG) in the 2021 Birthday Honours.
