= Terence O'Brien (British diplomat) =

Terence John O'Brien, CMG, MC (13 October 1921 in Ranchi, India – 22 December 2006 in Wallingford, Oxfordshire, England) was a British career diplomat.

== Background ==
Born in India, the son of Joseph O'Brien, he belonged to a long line of British civil servants who served the Indian Empire. When he was eleven his father retired and settled in the English county of Norfolk.

== Education and war service ==
O'Brien was educated at Gresham's School, Holt and Merton College, Oxford, where he was a Postmaster Scholar. He arrived at Oxford in 1939, and his university career was soon interrupted by the Second World War. He served as a captain in the Ayrshire Yeomanry and took part in the Normandy Landings, being awarded the Military Cross in 1945 for his survey work between Allied and enemy lines. After the war, he returned to Oxford to complete his degree and was an active member of the Oxford University Dramatic Society.

== Career ==
In 1947, O'Brien joined the Dominions Office, then was at the Commonwealth Relations Office from 1947 to 1949. From 1950 to 1952, he was at the British High Commission in Ceylon, then was seconded to the Treasury from 1953 to 1956. He was First Secretary (Financial) at the British High Commission in Australia from 1956 to 1958, and later joined the British Diplomatic Service. His subsequent career was spent in South and South East Asia.

He was appointed British ambassador to Nepal in 1970. He visited remote regions to assess British aid projects, and on one occasion trekked with the Crown Prince Birendra, a close friend. His greatest achievement there was averting a serious famine by co-ordinating a relief operation involving the RAF and the Indian government. In Kathmandu he invented the sport of duck racing.

He was posted as ambassador to Burma in 1974 and was appalled by the regime of General Ne Win, whom he was obliged to meet officially on many occasions. Among his friends there were U Myint Thein, a former Chief Justice, and Daw Khin Kyi, the widow of Aung San and mother of Aung San Suu Kyi.

He next went as ambassador to Indonesia in 1978, then presided over by Suharto, where he faced the challenge of a trade war between Britain and Indonesia.

He retired to Dorset in 1981, where he spent much of his time trout fishing. When he died in 2006, he was living at Wallingford, Oxfordshire.

=== Diplomatic career summary ===
- Dominions Office, 1947
- Commonwealth Relations Office, 1947 to 1949
- British High Commission, Ceylon, 1950 to 1952
- seconded to the Treasury, 1953 to 1956
- British High Commission, Australia, 1958 to 1960
- First Secretary, Kuala Lumpur, 1960 to 1962
- Secretary to Intergovernmental Committee, Jesselton, Sabah, 1962–63
- Head of Chancery, New Delhi, 1963 to 1966
- Counsellor, Foreign and Commonwealth Office, 1968 to 1970
- Ambassador to Nepal, 1970 to 1974
- Ambassador to Burma, 1974 to 1978
- Ambassador to Indonesia, 1978 to 1981

== Family ==
O'Brien married Phyllis Mitchell in 1950, but she died of polio in 1952. In 1953 he married Rita Emily Drake Reynolds; they had one son and two daughters.

== Honours ==
- Military Cross, 1945
- Companion of the Order of St Michael and St George, 1971

Diplomatic posts
Preceded by Richard Hugh Sedley Allen	British Ambassador to Burma; 1974–1978	Succeeded by Nicholas Fenn
