= Thomas Maitland Snow =

British diplomat

Thomas Maitland Snow, CMG (21 May 1890 – 24 January 1997) was a British diplomat.

== Biography ==
The son of Thomas Snow, of Cleve, Exeter, and Edith Banbury, Snow was educated at Winchester College, where was Exhibitioner and New College, Oxford, where he was Scholar and graduated BA in Classics.

He joined the Foreign Office in 1914 and served in Christiania (Oslo), Athens, Bern, Madrid, Warsaw, Tokyo, and Madrid. He was British Minister to Cuba from 1935 to 1937, British Minister to Finland from 1937 to 1940, British Minister to Colombia from 1941 to 1945 (Ambassador from 1944 to 1945), and British Minister to Switzerland from 1946 to 1949. He retired in 1950.

Snow was appointed CMG in 1934. Snow was married twice. His first marriage to Phyllis Annette Malcolmson in 1927 produced three sons. In 1949, he married Sylvia Snow for the second time. He died at the age of 106.
