= Czech Republic–United Kingdom relations =

- Czech Republic: United Kingdom

Diplomatic mission
- Czech Republic Embassy, London: British Embassy, Prague

Envoy
- Ambassador Václav Bartuška: Ambassador Matt Field

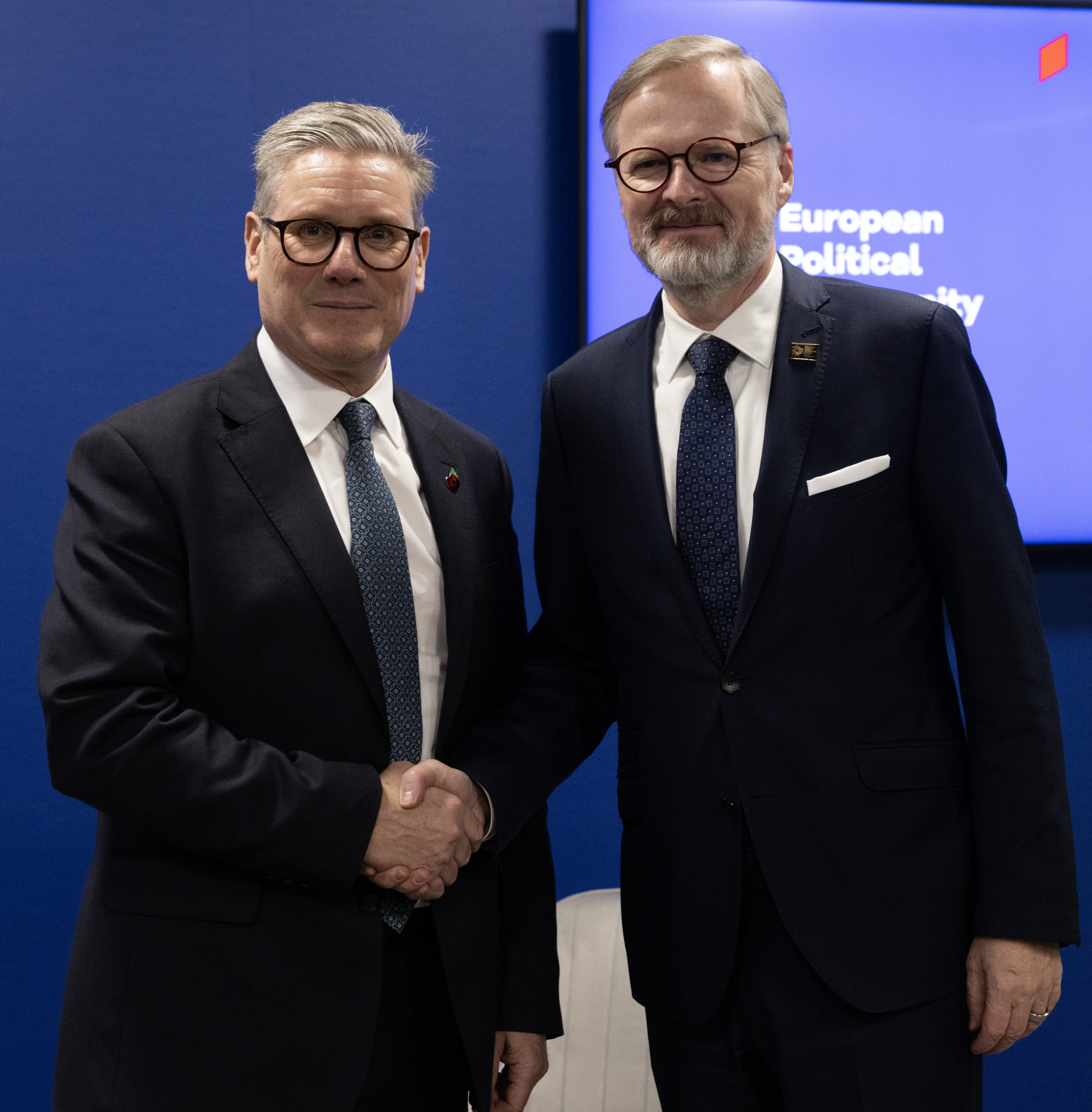
British Prime Minister Keir Starmer with Czech Prime Minister Petr Fiala at a European Political Community summit in Budapest, November 2024.

Czech Republic–United Kingdom relations encompass the diplomatic, economic, and historical interactions between the Czech Republic and the United Kingdom of Great Britain and Northern Ireland. Czechoslovakia and the United Kingdom established diplomatic relations on 26 October 1918.

Both countries share common membership of the Council of Europe, the European Court of Human Rights, the International Criminal Court, NATO, the OSCE, the United Nations, and the World Trade Organization. Bilaterally the two countries have a Double Taxation Convention.

== History ==
King John of Bohemia was killed in action in the Battle of Crécy in 1346 aiding France against England.

The United Kingdom and Czechoslovakia historically had lukewarm, although not hostile, relations largely due to Britain's lack of involvement in continental Europe beyond France and Czechoslovakia being caught in between the mostly capitalist Allied countries and the Soviet Union. Initially the two nations were allies and trading partners during the years prior to World War II. The first Czechoslovak Republic's founder Tomáš Masaryk had lived in London during World War I, where he had met Wickham Steed, a famous Times Journalist and Sir George Clerk. Ex British intelligence officer Robert Bruce was a notable English Czechophile, who would later go on to become commercial secretary and was on friendly terms with Masaryk, the first president of Czechoslovakia. Ties were somewhat strained when Nazi Germany annexed much of the country under the terms of the Munich Agreement (1938), which many Czechs viewed as the "Munich betrayal" (Czech: Mnichovská zrada). Over 500 Czech pilots, most of whom had fled the Nazi occupation to Allied countries, served with Royal Air Force and gained distinction during the Battle of Britain for their bravery and skills. One such pilot was Josef František, a Distinguished Flying Medal recipient and one of only two non-Commonwealth nationals among "The Few" who were the top ten leading aces. Britain was one of several countries Czech Jewish refugees fled to, most notably through Kindertransport.

Britain and France had to choose between war and dishonour. They chose dishonour. They will have war.

— Winston Churchill on the Munich Agreement

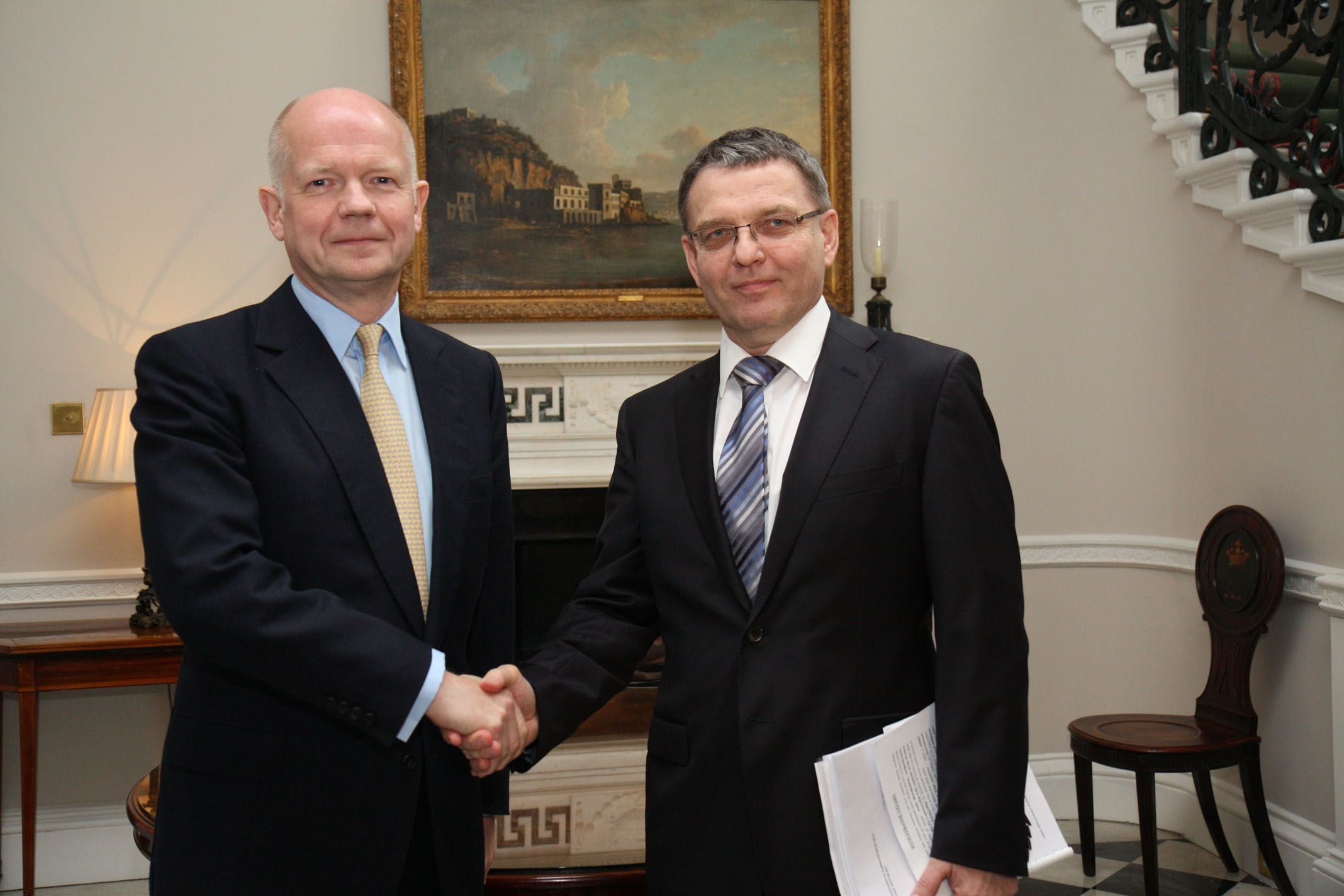
British Foreign Secretary William Hague meeting Czech Minister of Foreign Affairs, Lubomír Zaorálek in London, May 2014.

During the Cold War, relations again worsened as Britain was an ally of the United States, the "enemy" of the Soviet Union, making Britain and the Socialist-ruled Czechoslovakia "enemies" by association. Since the dissolution of Czechoslovakia, economic relations have largely normalised, although neither countries are priority allies for the other.

Following the Brexit, the UK sought to strengthen its ties with the Czech Republic, proposing a new strategic partnership to enhance cooperation in areas such as education, science, internal security, and trade.

Both governments publicly characterize their bilateral relationship as “excellent” and demonstrate a clear commitment to deepening cooperation, particularly in sectors where the Czech Republic brings distinct value to the United Kingdom. This shared ambition to enhance ties is pursued alongside a mutual dedication to maintaining robust engagement with European partners and institutions, reflecting a strategic alignment that balances national interests with broader regional collaboration.

In July 2025 the Czech Republic and the UK signed a key agreement to boost cooperation on nuclear energy, focusing on small modular reactors (SMRs). The deal may lead to UK-based Rolls-Royce SMR setting up a factory in the Czech Republic, supporting Czech plans to expand nuclear capacity by 2050. It also covers nuclear fuel, waste management, and regulation, strengthening energy security and UK–Czech ties.

== Trade ==
Bilateral trade was worth £6.7 billion in 2011. As of Q4 2024, trade in goods and services reached £10.8 billion, a 1.5% increase demonstrating strong economic ties.

== Migration ==
The 2001 UK Census recorded 12,220 Czech-born people resident in the UK. The Office for National Statistics estimates that, as of October 2010 to September 2011, 24,000 to 40,000 Czech-born people were living in the UK. In 2024 Czech billionaire Daniel Křetínský leader of The EP Group bought Royal Mail’s parent company.

== State visits ==
Queen Elizabeth II paid a state visit to the Czech Republic in March 1996, she visited Prague and Brno and was received by President Václav Havel. From 2008 to 2025, there were five visits by Czech Prime ministers to the UK and three presidential visits by President Václav Klaus. During July 2025 Czech PM Peter Fiala and UK PM Keir Starmer met in London and at Downing Street to discuss energy, trade, and defence issues.

== Diplomatic missions ==
- the Czech Republic maintains an embassy in London.
- The United Kingdom is accredited to the Czech Republic through its embassy in Prague.
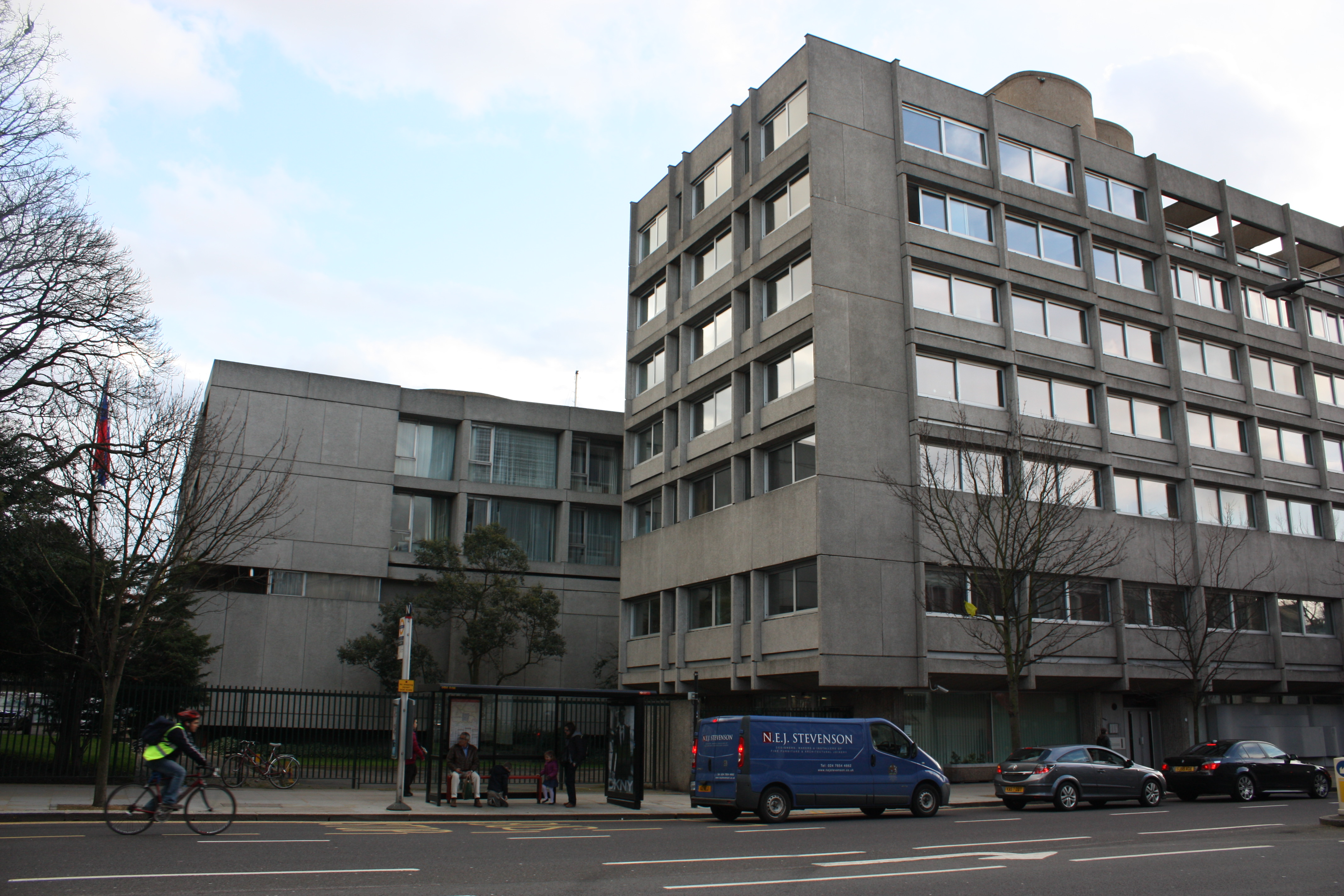
Embassy of the Czech Republic in London

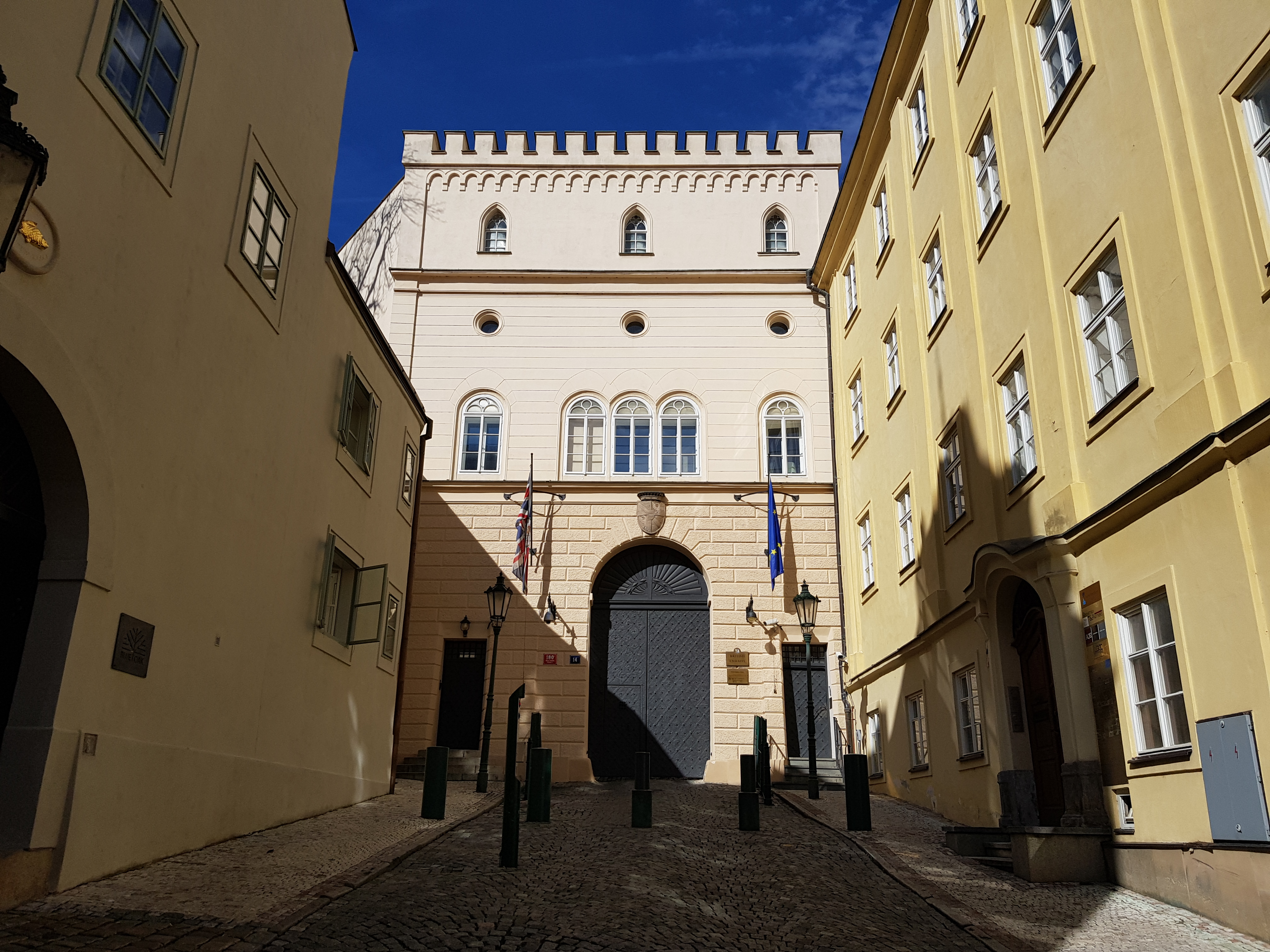
Embassy of the United Kingdom in Prague

== See also ==
- British diaspora
- Czech migration to the United Kingdom
- Foreign relations of the Czech Republic
- Foreign relations of the United Kingdom
