= Henry Hainworth =

Henry Charles Hainworth CMG (12 September 1914 – 28 January 2005) was the British ambassador to Indonesia, 1968–1970, and to the Conference of the Committee on Disarmament in Geneva in the early 1970s.

== Education ==
Henry Hainworth was educated at Blundell's School in Tiverton and at Sidney Sussex College in Cambridge.

== Diplomatic career ==
Hainworth joined the Consular Service in 1939 and in 1940 he was posted to the embassy in Tokyo. He was in Japan on the day of the Japanese attack on Pearl Harbor, and had to wait six months for repatriation, by which time the first American air raids on Tokyo were already taking place.

Hainworth was subsequently deployed to the Ministry of Information in Delhi, where he was employed for the rest of the war on public information and propaganda work. In 1946 he went back to Tokyo, among the first diplomats to return to the embassy. They found their offices and houses had been impeccably safeguarded by Japanese staff throughout the war, the only damage had been inflicted by men of the Royal Navy sent to secure the compound as the occupation forces arrived in 1945.

Hainworth spent five-year stint in Tokyo, which was still devastated by wartime firebombings, then, after a spell in London and 30 months in Bucharest, where he experienced communist dictatorship at its most repressive, he was sent to the Nato defence college in Paris. However, the Suez crisis meant he was dispatched to the office of the political adviser to the commander of British forces in the Middle East, based in Nicosia in Cyprus. During the summer and autumn of 1956 that office was caught up on the one hand with the Greek Cypriot insurgency against British rule, on the other with the Anglo-French planning for the attack on Egypt.

Hainworth was subsequently promoted to the rank of counsellor, he became the head of the Foreign Office’s Atomic Energy and Disarmament Department, followed by two years’ engagement with the Brussels negotiations for British membership of the European Community. He then spent five years as the ambassador’s deputy in Vienna and, in 1968, was appointed ambassador to Indonesia.

Hainworth’s obituary notes:

“He went to a country which had put an end to its undeclared war with Malaysia only two years earlier. In that war British forces had played a leading and vigorous part in defence of Malaysia, grappling with the Indonesians in the jungles of Borneo (see Indonesia–Malaysia confrontation). The Indonesian leader, Sukarno, was gone, but the army leaders who had overthrown him remained, and with them much of his hostility to Britain. Internally, the Indonesian Army’s massacre of many of the Chinese minority had left bitter memories. The country was racked by corruption, ethnic strife and abuse of basic rights. Hainworth played a very positive role in seeking to remove unnecessary causes of friction and looking for what commercial opportunities he could discern in this huge, potentially prosperous country.

From Indonesia Hainworth moved to his last official appointment, as ambassador and representative to the disarmament conference in Geneva. The work was intellectually demanding even as the talks went nowhere, and Hainworth carried out his job, as all his others, with solid distinction.”

Hainworth was appointed Commander of the Order of St Michael and St George in 1961 and retired from the Diplomatic Service in 1974, later serving for eight years as chairman of the Anglo-Indonesian Society.

== Publications ==
Hainworth’s 1981 publication, A Collector's Dictionary, is available to view at Google Books:

- A Collector's Dictionary, Henry Hainworth; Published by Routledge & Co; London, 1981

== Sources ==
- Extracted from the Obituary of Henry Hainworth, The Times, 8 March, 2005
