= Geoffrey Furlonge =

British diplomat (1903–1984)

Sir Geoffrey Furlonge KBE CMG

British Ambassador to Ethiopia
- In office 1956–1959
- Preceded by: Douglas Busk
- Succeeded by: Denis Wright

British envoy extraordinary and minister plenipotentiary to Bulgaria
- In office 1954–1956
- Preceded by: John Carvell
- Succeeded by: Richard Speaight

British Ambassador to Jordan
- In office 1952–1954
- Preceded by: Sir Alec Kirkbride
- Succeeded by: Sir Charles Duke

Personal details
- Born: 16 October 1903
- Died: 15 August 1984 (aged 80) Midhurst, Sussex
- Education: Emmanuel College, Cambridge
- Occupation: Diplomat

Sir Geoffrey Warren Furlonge (16 October 1903 – 15 August 1984) was a British diplomat who served as ambassador to Jordan from 1952 to 1954, envoy extraordinary and minister plenipotentiary to Bulgaria from 1954 to 1956 and ambassador to Ethiopia from 1956 to 1959.

== Early life and education ==
Furlonge was born on 16 October 1903, the son of Robert Shekleton Furlonge and Agnes Mary née Hatch. He was educated at St Paul’s School, London and Emmanuel College, Cambridge.

== Career ==
Furlonge entered the Levant Consular Service in 1926, and served at Casablanca from 1928 to 1931 and as vice-consul Jeddah from 1931 to 1934. He then spent twelve years at Beirut remaining in the post until 1946 while also serving as political officer with British forces in the Levant states during the War. According to The Times, Furlonge demonstrated considerable diplomacy "to keep relations between the occupying forces, the Free French, and the increasingly nationalist-minded Syrian and Lebanese politicians from exploding." After a year on sabbatical at the Imperial Defence College, he served in the Foreign Office as head of the Commonwealth Liaison Department from 1948 to 1950 and then head of the Eastern Department from 1950 to 1951.

In 1952, he went to Jordan as minister and later was appointed ambassador, remaining in the post until 1954. After the succession crisis following the assassination of King Abdulla in 1951, Furlonge established a good relationship with the new king, Hussein, a minor, and prime minister Tawfik Abu al-Huda. After serving as envoy extraordinary and minister plenipotentiary to Bulgaria from 1954 to 1956, he was appointed ambassador to Ethiopia, a post he held until his retirement in 1959.

== Personal life and death ==
Furlonge married twice. First in 1952 to Anne Goldsack. After she died in 1975, that year he married Vera Kathleen, widow of Major Guy Farquhar.

Furlonge died on 15 August 1984 at Midhurst, Sussex, aged 80.

== Honours ==
Furlonge was appointed Companion of the Order of St Michael and St George (CMG) in the 1951 New Year Honours. He was appointed Officer of the Order of the British Empire (OBE) in 1942, and promoted to Knight Commander of the Order of the British Empire (KBE) in the 1960 New Year Honours.

== Publications ==
- The Lands of Barbary (1966)
- Palestine is my country: the story of Musa Alami (1969)

== See also ==
- Ethiopia–United Kingdom relations
- Jordan–United Kingdom relations
- Bulgaria–United Kingdom relations

Diplomatic posts
Preceded by Sir Alec Kirkbride	British Ambassador to Jordan; 1952–1954	Succeeded by Sir Charles Duke
Preceded by John Carvell	British envoy extraordinary and minister plenipotentiary to Bulgaria; 1954–1956	Succeeded by Richard Speaight
Preceded by Douglas Busk	British Ambassador to Ethiopia; 1956–1959	Succeeded by Denis Wright
