= Richard Allen (diplomat) =

British diplomat (1903–1996)

Sir Richard Allen KCMG
- Allen in 1960

British Ambassador to Burma
- In office 1956–1962
- Preceded by: Paul Gore-Booth
- Succeeded by: Gordon Whitteridge

Personal details
- Born: 3 February 1903
- Died: 16 January 1996 (aged 92)
- Children: 1
- Education: New College, Oxford
- Occupation: Diplomat

Sir Richard Hugh Sedley Allen KCMG (3 February 1903 – 16 January 1996) was a British diplomat who served as ambassador to Burma from 1956 to 1962.

== Early life and education ==
Allen was born on 3 February 1903, the son of Sir Hugh Allen GCVO. He was educated at Royal Naval Colleges, Osborne and Dartmouth and New College, Oxford.

== Career ==
Allen entered the Foreign Office in 1927 after working for two years as an assistant to the governor of Palestine and was sent to Tokyo as third secretary. He then served at Prague, Berne and Bogatá before he returned to the Foreign Office for the duration of the Second World War. From 1945 to 1950, he served as Counsellor at the British Embassy in Poland.

Allen served as Minister to Argentina from 1950 to 1954; Minister to Guatemala as head of the Legation from 1954 to 1956; and Ambassador to Burma from 1956 to 1962. During his posting in Rangoon he was appointed KCMG, the last British Ambassador to Burma to be knighted.

After retiring from the Diplomatic Service, Allen became a lecturer at Walla Walla University, in Washington State, United States and held visiting lectureships at several other US universities.

== Personal life and death ==
Allen married Juliet Thomson in 1945. She died in 1983. They had a son who predeceased him.

Allen died on 16 January 1996, aged 92.

== Publications ==
- Malaysia: Prospect and Retrospect, 1968.
- A Short Introduction to the History and Politics of Southeast Asia, 1970.
- Imperialism and Nationalism in the Fertile Crescent, 1974.

== Honours ==
Allen was appointed Companion of the Order of St Michael and St George (CMG) in the 1953 Coronation Honours, and promoted to Knight Commander (KCMG) in the 1960 New Year Honours.

Diplomatic posts
| Preceded by Paul Gore-Booth | British Ambassador to Burma; 1956–1962 | Succeeded by Gordon Whitteridge |
