= Knox Helm =

British diplomat (1893–1964)

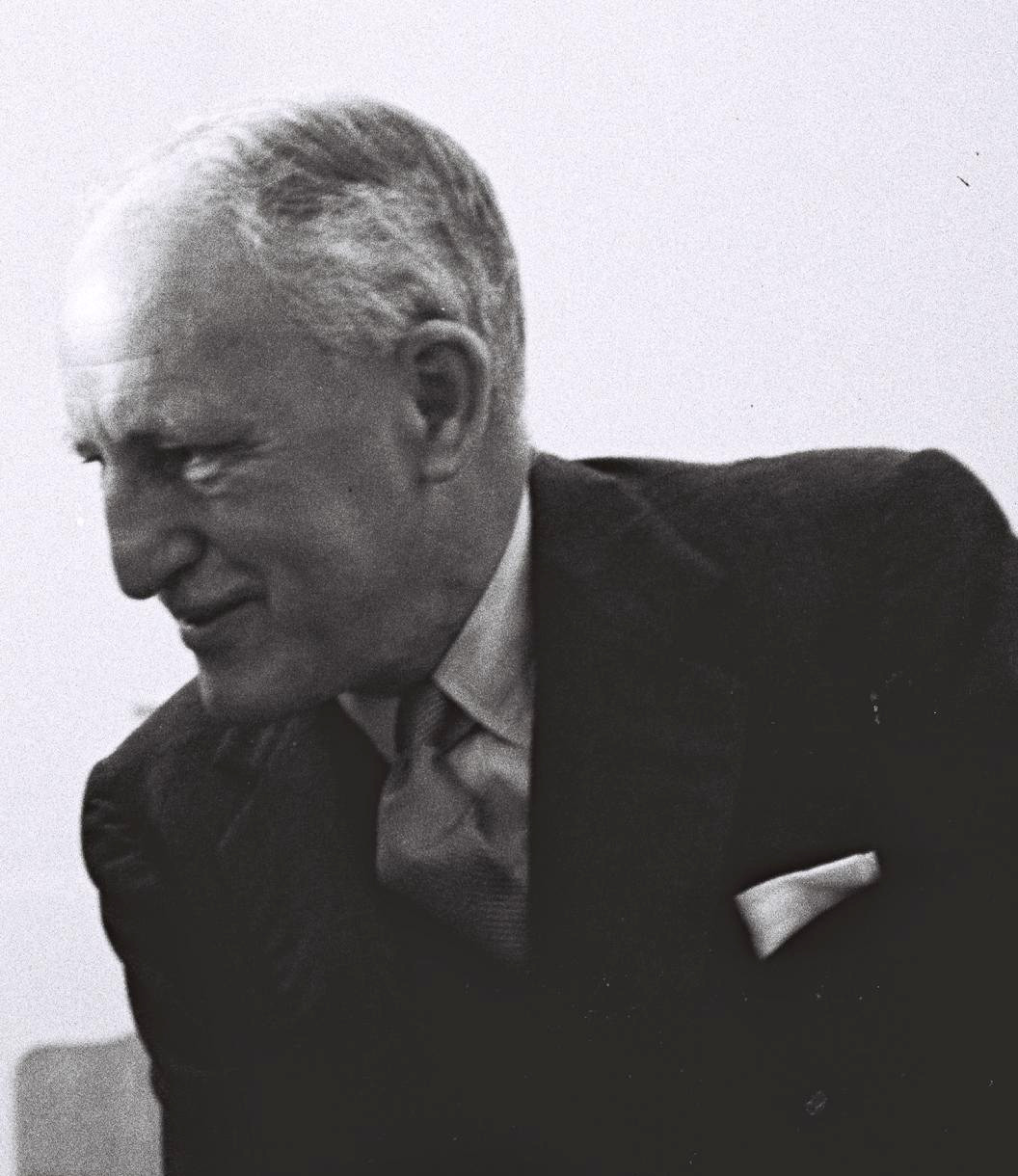
Sir Knox Helm, 1951

Sir Alexander Knox Helm GBE KCMG (23 March 1893 – 7 March 1964) was a British diplomat who served as ambassador to Turkey and was the last governor-general of Sudan.

== Early years ==
Born to W. H. Helm of Dumfries, Alexander Knox Helm was educated at Dumfries Academy and King's College, Cambridge.

== Career ==
In 1912, he passed the examination for what was then called second division clerkships and was appointed to the Foreign Office. He served as a member of the East Registry. A keen volunteer when World War I broke out, he was allowed by the Foreign Office to join his field artillery unit, being promoted second lieutenant in 1917 and serving in that capacity in Palestine. As a clerk, he performed only routine duties but distinguished himself through his diligence and retentive memory.

When the war ended, he was selected under the special recruitment scheme for filling vacancies caused by the war and was appointed to the Levant Consular Service. After a short period of training in Oriental languages at King's College, Cambridge, he went as vice-consul to Thessaloniki, and soon after became third Dragoman at Constantinople. When the Turkish capital moved to Ankara and the office of dragoman was abolished, Helm went there as second secretary. He served there as consul, and in 1930 was transferred to the Foreign Office, working in the Eastern Department.

In 1937 he was sent as consul to Addis Ababa, and at the outbreak of World War II was moved to the British embassy at Washington, D.C., where he handled the various complicated problems connected with the supply of petroleum to the United Kingdom. In 1942 he went back to Ankara (at that moment a key post) as counsellor.

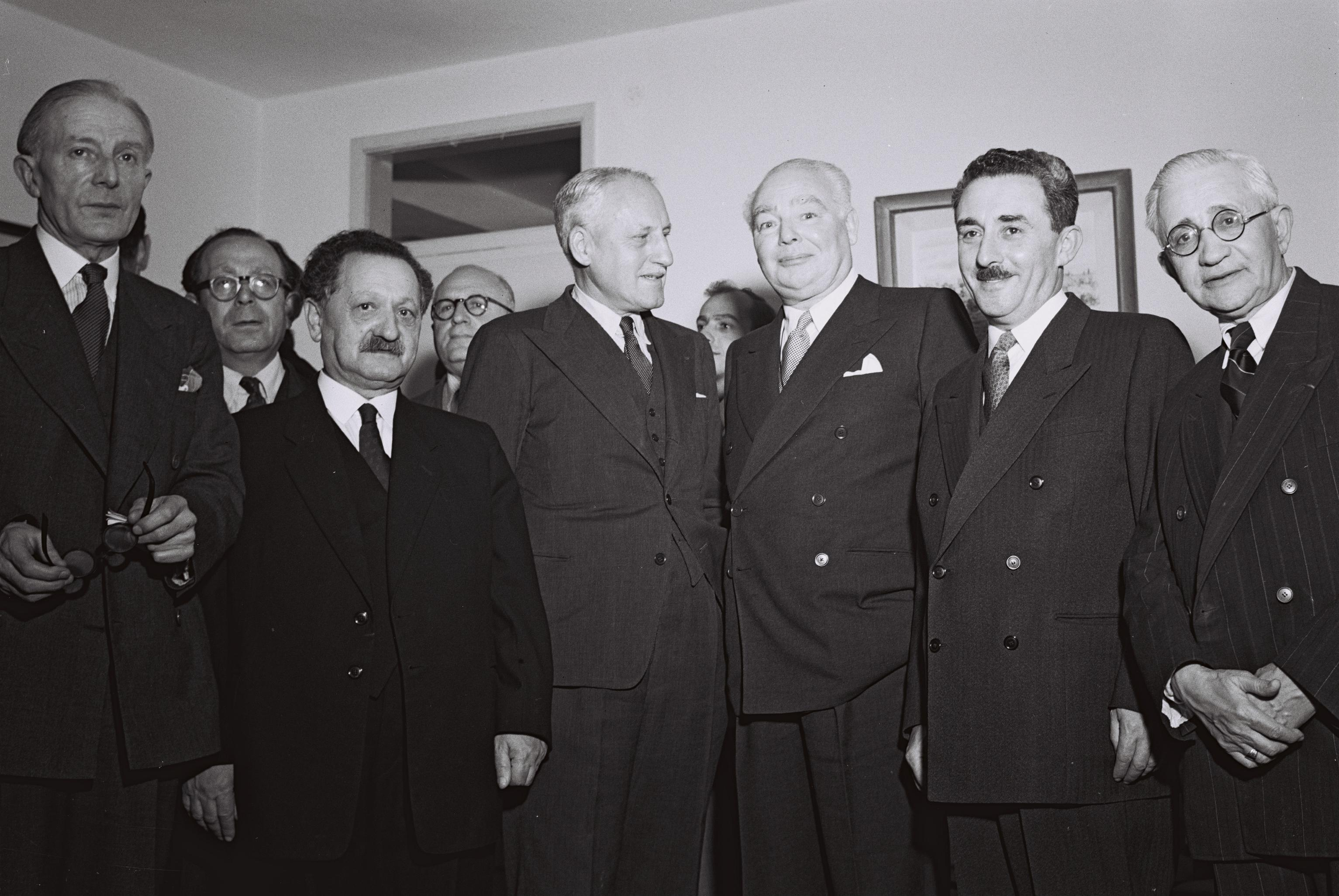
L-R: W.G. Hall, Moshe Rosetti, Yosef Sprinzak, Sir Knox Helm, Leslie Hore-Belisha and Moshe Sharett in the Israeli Knesset, 1951

In 1946 he was chosen to go as British representative to Hungary and when normal diplomatic relations were restored in 1947 he was made minister there. In 1949 he was appointed the first British Chargé d'Affaires (later Minister) to Tel Aviv in the newly independent State of Israel, where he spent two happy and fruitful years; in 1951 he became Ambassador to Turkey. He left there in 1954, having reached retirement age, but went for a brief period to Khartoum in 1955, being the last governor-general there.

Helm was a man of strong character and great determination. A tenacious and forceful negotiator, he had great powers of persuasion and a remarkable sense of timing – valuable gifts which were supplemented with a sense of humor and of proportion and charm which was genuine: few people can ever have said 'No' in a more pleasant way. He was an exacting chief but popular with his staff, who always knew that he could do any of their jobs better than they could themselves. Moreover, he was always ready to listen to their advice, but equally, he invariably made up his own mind.

He retained to the end the accent and intonation of the Dumfriesshire farming stock from which he came and his love for and understanding of the things of the soil often stood him in good stead in posts where agricultural problems bulked large in the economy of the country.

— The Times

== Spouses ==
His first wife, Grace Little, died in 1925. His second, Isabel Marsh, whom he married in 1931, survived him after he died at sea in 1964.

== Publications ==
- The Middle East of to-day and its problems (Ramsay Muir memorial lecture delivered at Cambridge on 5 August 1956), Ramsay Muir Educational Trust, Purley, 1956

Diplomatic posts
Preceded by No representation due to World War II	Minister to Hungary; 1947–1949	Succeeded by Sir Geoffrey Wallinger
Preceded by Alan Cunningham (As High Commissioner of Palestine)	Ambassador to Israel; 1949–1951	Succeeded by Sir Francis Evans
Preceded by Sir Noel Charles	Ambassador to Turkey; 1951–1954	Succeeded by Sir James Bowker
Government offices
Preceded by Sir Robert Howe	Governor-General of the Sudan; 1954–1955	Succeeded by abolished – Independence of Sudan
