= Charles Duke (diplomat) =

British diplomat (1905–1978)

Sir Charles Duke KCMG OBE CIE KStJ

British Ambassador to Morocco
- In office 1957–1961
- Preceded by: Harold Freese-Pennefather
- Succeeded by: Sir Richard Beaumont

British Ambassador to Jordan
- In office 1954–1956
- Preceded by: Geoffrey Furlonge
- Succeeded by: Sir Charles Johnston

Personal details
- Born: 19 December 1905
- Died: 14 November 1978 (aged 72)
- Children: 2
- Education: Lincoln College, Oxford
- Occupation: Diplomat

Sir Charles Beresford Duke (19 December 1905 – 14 November 1978) was a British diplomat who served as ambassador to Jordan from 1954 to 1956 and ambassador to Morocco from 1957 to 1961.

== Early life and education ==
Duke was born on 19 December 1905, the son of Arthur Herbert and Ann Victoria Duke. He was educated at Charterhouse School and Lincoln College, Oxford.

== Career ==
Duke entered the Indian Civil Service in 1928, and was sent to the United Provinces of Agra and Oudh. In 1934, he transferred to the Indian Political Service and was assistant private secretary to the viceroy from 1934 to 1938 and then secretary to the governor of the North-West Frontier Province from 1940 to 1941. From 1941 to 1943, he served as political agent in Waziristan and from 1943 to 1947 he worked as secretary in the External Affairs Department of the Government of India at New Delhi.

In 1947, Duke transferred to the Foreign Service, and served in Pakistan as deputy high commissioner at Peshawar and then as counsellor at the British Embassy in Egypt and as consul-general at Mashhad, Iran. In 1954, he was appointed Ambassador to Jordan, remaining in the post until 1956. His final posting before retirement was as Ambassador to Morocco from 1957 to 1961.

In retirement, Duke was director-general of the Middle East Association from 1964 to 1970.

== Personal life and death ==
Duke married Morag Craigie Grant in 1938 and they had two daughters.

Duke died on 14 November 1978, aged 72.

== Honours ==
- Duke was appointed Companion of the Order of St Michael and St George (CMG) in the 1954 Birthday Honours.
- Promoted to Knight Commander of the Order of St Michael and St George (KCMG) in the 1956 Birthday Honours.
- Appointed Officer of the Order of the British Empire (OBE) in the 1946 New Year Honours.
- Appointed Companion of the Order of the Indian Empire (CIE) in the 1947 Birthday Honours.
- Appointed Knight of the Order of the Hospital of St John of Jerusalem (KStJ) in 1956.

== See also ==
- Jordan–United Kingdom relations
- Morocco–United Kingdom relations

Diplomatic posts
Preceded by Geoffrey Furlonge	British Ambassador to Jordan; 1954–1956	Succeeded by Sir Charles Johnston
Preceded by Harold Freese-Pennefather	British Ambassador to Morocco; 1957–1961	Succeeded by Sir Richard Beaumont
