= List of ambassadors of the United Kingdom to Myanmar =

The ambassador of the United Kingdom to Burma is the United Kingdom's chief diplomatic representative in Burma, and head of the UK's diplomatic mission.

The government of Burma changed the name of the country to Myanmar on 18 June 1989, but the UK government has not recognised the change of name, hence the ambassador's official title is "His Majesty's Ambassador to Burma".

== Ambassadors ==
- 1948–1950: James Bowker
- 1950–1953: Richard Speaight
- 1953–1956: Paul Gore-Booth
- 1956–1962: Sir Richard Allen
- 1962–1965: Sir Gordon Whitteridge
- 1965–1967: Leonard Wakely
- 1967–1970: Trafford Smith
- 1970–1974: Edward Willan
- 1974–1978: Terence O'Brien
- 1978–1982: Charles Booth
- 1982–1986: Sir Nicholas Fenn
- 1986–1990: Martin Morland
- 1990–1995: Julian Hartland-Swann
- 1995–1999: Robert Gordon
- 1999–2002: John Jenkins
- 2002–2006: Vicky Bowman
- 2006–2009: Mark Canning
- 2009–2013: Andrew Heyn
- 2013–2018: Andrew Patrick
- 2018–2021: Dan Chugg
- 2021–2022: Pete Vowles
- 2023–2025: Ken O'Flaherty
- 2025–present: Andrew Jackson
