= Peter Millett =

Peter Millett may refer to

- Peter Millett, Baron Millett (1932–2021), British judge
- Peter Millett (diplomat) (born 1955), British ambassador to Libya
