= List of ambassadors of the United Kingdom to Ethiopia =

The ambassador of the United Kingdom to Ethiopia is the United Kingdom's foremost diplomatic representative in the Federal Democratic Republic of Ethiopia, and head of the UK's diplomatic mission in Addis Ababa.

The British Embassy in Addis Ababa also represents British interests in the Republic of Djibouti and the African Union whose secretariat is based in Addis Ababa.

== List of heads of mission ==
=== Envoys extraordinary and ministers plenipotentiary ===
- 1903–1909: Sir John Harrington (Agent from 1898, Consul-General from 1900, Minister Plenipotentiary from 1903, local rank of Envoy Extraordinary and Minister Plenipotentiary from 1908)
- 1909–1919: Wilfred Thesiger (Consul-General with local rank of Envoy Extraordinary and Minister Plenipotentiary)
- 1920–1925: Claud Russell
- 1925–1928: Charles Bentinck
- 1928–1929: Sydney Waterlow
- 1929–1936: Sir Sidney Barton
- 1936–1941: No representation due to occupation by Italy
- 1942–1945: Robert Howe
- 1946–1948: Sir Harold Farquhar
- 1948–1951: Daniel Lascelles

=== Ambassadors extraordinary and plenipotentiary ===
- 1949–1951: Daniel Lascelles
- 1952–1956: Douglas Busk
- 1956–1959: Geoffrey Furlonge
- 1959–1962: Denis Wright
- 1962–1966: Sir John Russell
- 1966–1969: Thomas Bromley
- 1969–1972: Alan Campbell
- 1972–1975: Willie Morris
- 1975–1978: Derek Day
- 1979–1982: Robert Tesh
- 1982–1986: Brian Barder
- 1986–1990: Harold Walker
- 1990–1994: James Glaze
- 1994–1997: Robin Christopher
- 1997–2000: Gordon Wetherell (also to Eritrea and Djibouti)
- 2000–2004: Myles Wickstead (also to Djibouti)
- 2004–2007: Robert Dewar (also to African Union)
- 2008–2011: Norman Ling (also to Djibouti and African Union)
- 2011–2016: Gregory Dorey (also to Djibouti, Somaliland and African Union)
- 2016–2018: Susanna Moorehead (also to Djibouti and African Union)
- 2019–2022: Alastair McPhail (also to Djibouti and African Union)
- 2022–present: Darren Welch (also to African Union)
