= Anthony Lincoln =

British diplomat (1911–1993)

Sir Anthony Lincoln KCMG CVO
- Portrait by Walter Bird, 1960

British Ambassador to Venezuela
- In office 1964–1969
- Preceded by: Sir Douglas Busk
- Succeeded by: Sir Donald Hopson

British envoy extraordinary and minister plenipotentiary to Bulgaria
- In office 1960–1963
- Preceded by: Sir Anthony Lambert
- Succeeded by: William Harpham

British Ambassador to Laos
- In office 1958–1960
- Preceded by: Leonard Holliday
- Succeeded by: Sir John Addis

Personal details
- Born: 2 January 1911 London
- Died: 15 November 1993 (aged 82)
- Education: Magdalene College, Cambridge
- Occupation: Diplomat

Sir Anthony Handley Lincoln (2 January 1911 – 15 November 1993) was a British diplomat who served as ambassador to Laos from 1958 to 1960, envoy extraordinary and minister plenipotentiary to Bulgaria from 1960 to 1964, and ambassador to Venezuela from 1964 to 1969.

== Early life and education ==
Lincoln was born in London on 2 January 1911. He was educated at Mill Hill School and Magdalene College, Cambridge where he took a first in history and won the Gladstone and Prince Consort Prizes.

== Career ==
Lincoln joined the Department of Customs and Excise in 1934, and in the following year transferred to the Board of Education. In 1939, he was at the Ministry of Economic Warfare working on the economic blockade of Germany, before he transferred to the Ministry of Production in 1942.

After a spell in the Colonial Office, in 1944, he entered the Foreign Office, was appointed a first secretary in 1946, and was a member of the UK delegation at the Paris Peace Conference. The following year, he was posted to Buenos Aires, before he returned to the Foreign Office, was promoted to counsellor, and from 1950 to 1952, served as head of the German general economic department. In 1952, he was seconded to the Council of Europe in Strasbourg as deputy secretary-general, and in 1955, was counsellor and head of Chancery at Copenhagen.

From 1958 to 1960, he served as ambassador to Laos, and then from 1960 to 1964, as envoy extraordinary and minister plenipotentiary to Bulgaria. In 1964, he was appointed ambassador to Venezuela, a post he held until his retirement from the Diplomatic Service in 1969.

In retirement, Lincoln worked in the records department of the Foreign Office assisting in categorising which documents should be destroyed or released, before he settled in East Anglia.

== Personal life and death ==
Lincoln married in 1948, Lisette Marion Summers, from a family of British expatriates in Argentina, whom he met in Buenos Aires. They had no children.

Lincoln died on 15 November 1993, aged 82.

== Honours ==
Lincoln was appointed Companion of the Order of St Michael and St George (CMG) in the 1958 Birthday Honours, and promoted to Knight Commander of the Order of St Michael and St George (KCMG) in the 1965 New Year Honours. He was appointed Commander of the Royal Victorian Order (CVO) in 1957. In 1950, he was appointed Officer of the Order of Nassau.

== See also ==
- Venezuela–United Kingdom relations
- Bulgaria–United Kingdom relations
- Laos–United Kingdom relations

Diplomatic posts
| Preceded by Leonard Holliday | British Ambassador to Laos; 1958–1960 | Succeeded by Sir John Addis |
| Preceded by Sir Anthony Lambert | British envoy extraordinary and minister plenipotentiary to Bulgaria; 1960–1963 | Succeeded by William Harpham |
| Preceded by Sir Douglas Busk | British Ambassador to Venezuela; 1964–1969 | Succeeded by Sir Donald Hopson |
