= Charles Joy =

Charles Joy may refer to:

- Charles A. Joy (1823–1891), American chemist
- Charles F. Joy (1849–1921), U.S. representative from Missouri
- Charles R. Joy (1885-1978)), Unitarian minister, author, and humanitarian relief worker
- C. Turner Joy (1895–1956), admiral of the United States Navy
- Charles Joy (engineer) (1911–1989), British aeronautical engineer
