= Daniel Lascelles (diplomat) =

British diplomat (1902–1967)

Sir Daniel Lascelles KCMG

British Ambassador to Japan
- In office 1957–1959
- Monarch: Elizabeth II
- Prime Minister: Harold Macmillan
- Preceded by: Sir Esler Dening
- Succeeded by: Sir Oscar Morland

British Ambassador to Afghanistan
- In office 1953–1957
- Monarch: Elizabeth II
- Prime Minister: Winston Churchill; Anthony Eden
- Preceded by: Eric Ralph Lingeman
- Succeeded by: Sir Michael Cavenagh Gillett

British Ambassador to Ethiopia
- In office 1949–1951
- Monarchs: George VI; Elizabeth II
- Prime Minister: Clement Attlee; Winston Churchill
- Preceded by: Himself (as Envoy Extraordinary and Minister Plenipotentiary)
- Succeeded by: Douglas Busk

Personal details
- Born: 19 March 1902
- Died: 17 October 1967 (aged 65)
- Relatives: Henry Lascelles, 4th Earl of Harewood (grandfather)
- Education: Royal Naval College, Osborne; Royal Naval College, Dartmouth
- Alma mater: Balliol College, Oxford

Sir Daniel William Lascelles KCMG (19 March 1902 – 17 October 1967) was a British diplomat. He was the British ambassador in Ethiopia, Afghanistan and Japan.

== Early life ==
Lascelles was the son of the Honourable William Horace Lascelles, eighth son of Henry Lascelles, 4th Earl of Harewood. His mother was Madeline Barton, daughter of Reverend Gerrard Barton. He was educated at The New Beacon, Royal Naval College, Osborne, Isle of Wight; at the Royal Naval College, Dartmouth, Devon; and at Balliol College, Oxford.

== Career ==
After an open competition in 1926, Lescelles earned a position and was subsequently appointed as a Third Secretary in the Diplomatic Service. In 1931, he was made Second Secretary. and in 1937, he was promoted to First Secretary.

In 1945, he was invested as a Companion of the Order of St Michael and St George and he was promoted in the Foreign Office hierarchy.

In 1948, he was appointed Envoy Extraordinary and Minister Plenipotentiary to Addis Ababa and then Consul-General to the Empire of Ethiopia. In 1949–1951, he became Ambassador to Ethiopia.

In 1953, he was appointed Ambassador in Kabul, Afghanistan. In 1954, he was invested as Knight Commander of the Order of St Michael and St George.

Lescelles was appointed Ambassador in Tokyo in 1957. He served from 1957 through 1959.

== Later life ==
He died on 17 October 1967 at age 65.

== Honours ==
- Order of St Michael and St George, companion (CMG), 1945.
- Order of St Michael and St George, Knight Commander (KCMG), 1954.

== See also ==
- List of Ambassadors from the United Kingdom to Ethiopia
- List of Ambassadors from the United Kingdom to Afghanistan
- List of Ambassadors from the United Kingdom to Japan
- Anglo-Japanese relations

== Notes ==
Diplomatic posts
Preceded by Himself	British Ambassador to Ethiopia; 1949–1951	Succeeded by Douglas Busk
Preceded by Eric Ralph Lingeman	British Ambassador to Afghanistan; 1953–1957	Succeeded by Sir Michael Cavenagh Gillett
Preceded by Sir Esler Dening	British Ambassador to Japan; 1957–1959	Succeeded by Sir Oscar Morland
