= Esler Dening =

British diplomat

Sir Esler Dening GCMG OBE
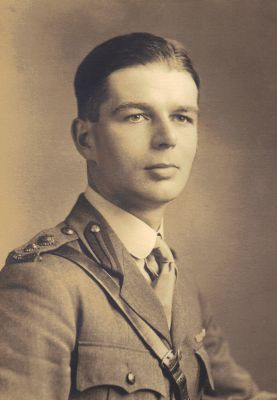

British Ambassador to Japan (Political Representative, 1951–1952)
- In office 1951–1957
- Monarch: Elizabeth II
- Prime Minister: Winston Churchill; Anthony Eden
- Preceded by: Sir Alvary Gascoigne
- Succeeded by: Sir Daniel Lascelles

Personal details
- Born: 21 April 1897
- Died: 29 January 1977 (aged 79)

Sir Esler Maberley Dening GCMG OBE (21 April 1897 – 29 January 1977) was a British diplomat. He was the first British Ambassador to Japan after the end of the Second World War.

== Career ==
Dening was a career foreign service officer; and he was promoted regularly across the span of years.

During the First World War Dening served with the Australian Imperial Force (service record). While serving with 31 Battalion AIF he was wounded in the Attack at Fromelles on 19 July 1916 and evacuated to England with shell shock. He later rejoined the 2nd Division as intelligence officer and was awarded an MBE in 1919.

Dening was consular officer in 1938, when he was awarded an OBE. During the Second World War, he served on the staff of Louis Mountbatten, 1st Earl Mountbatten of Burma. He had become the Chief Political Adviser to the Supreme Allied Commander, South-East Asia Command when he was made a member or Companion in the Order of St Michael and St George in 1945. In an unusual move Dening became a whistle blower in a dispatch to the Foreign Office, London; stating that Mountbatten constantly ignored the advice of those he commanded and described him as a ‘obsequious sycophant desperate that British-Indian operations in southern French Indo-China would not tarnish his professional reputation or SEAC legacy’(Pg.56).

In 1950, Dening was an Assistant Under-Secretary of State in the Foreign Office when the King promoted him to be a Knight Commander of the Order of St Michael and St George. He was the British Political Representative in Tokyo in 1950-1951 and when full diplomatic relations were re-established, his role was an essential element of the transition.

Sir Esler appointed to be Her Majesty's Ambassador Extraordinary and Plenipotentiary at Tokyo on 6 May 1952. He was the Ambassador from 1952 through 1957.

Ambassador Dening laying a wreath in the Yokohama War Cemetery on Remembrance Day — November 1955

In 1955, Sir Esler promoted to be a Member of the First Class, or Knight Grand Cross, of the Order of St Michael and St George.

== Later years ==
In 1977, the London Gazette published a notice of Sir Esler's death.

== Honours ==
- Order of the British Empire, Member Military Division (MBE), 1919.London Gazette 3 June 1919 page 6812
- Order of the British Empire, Officer (OBE), 1938.
- Order of St Michael and St George, Companion (CMG), 1945.
- Order of St Michael and St George, Knight Commander (KCMG), 1950.
- Order of St Michael and St George, Knight Grand Cross (GCMG), 1955.

== Selected works ==
In a statistical overview derived from writings by and about Maberley Esler Dening, OCLC/WorldCat encompasses roughly 7 works in 19 publications in 2 languages and 800+ library holdings .

- Japan (1960)
- The Life of Toyotomi Hideyoshi (1971)

== See also ==
- List of Ambassadors from the United Kingdom to Japan
- Anglo-Japanese relations

== Notes ==
Diplomatic posts
Preceded by Sir Alvary Gascoigne	British Political Representative to Japan; 1951–1952	Succeeded by Himself (as Ambassador)
Preceded by Himself (as Political Representative)	British Ambassador to Japan; 1952–1957	Succeeded by Sir Daniel Lascelles
