= Jordan–United Kingdom relations =

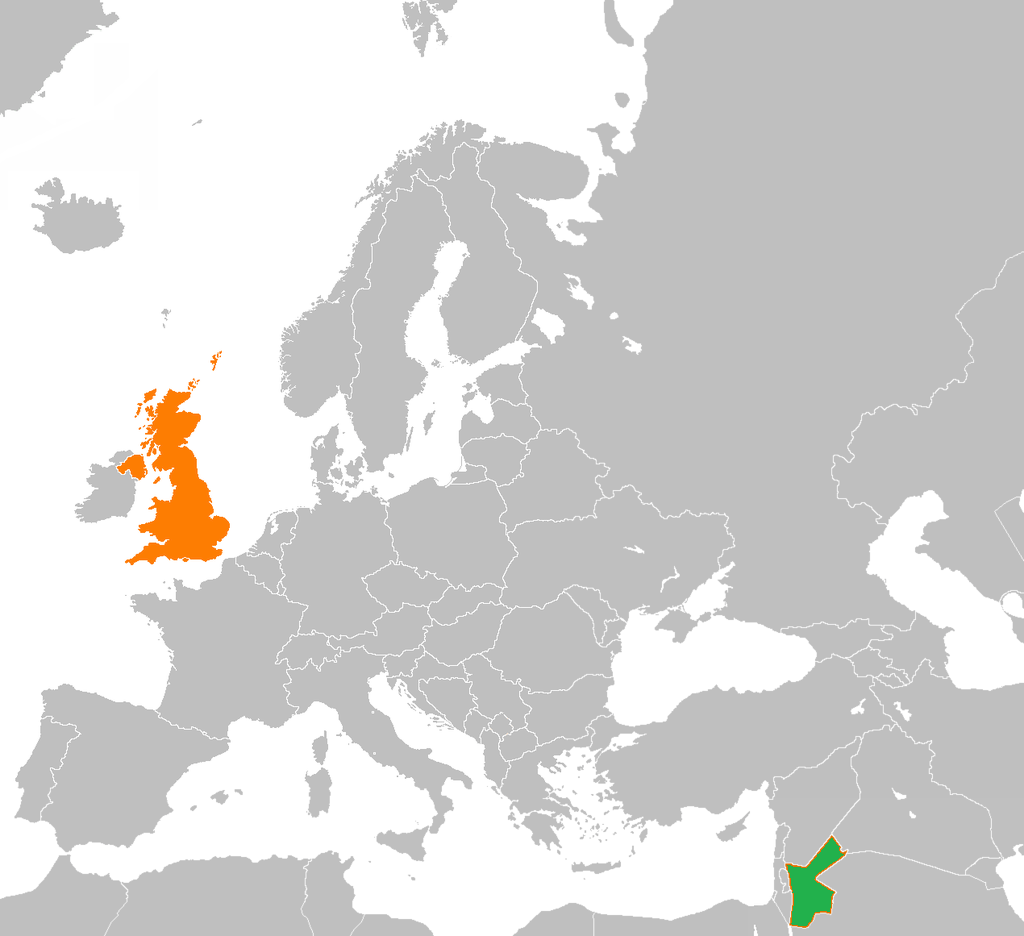

- Jordan: United Kingdom

Diplomatic mission
- Embassy of the United Kingdom, Amman: Embassy of Jordan, London

Envoy
- Manar M. Dabbas (since September 2021): Philip Hall (since 28 November 2023)

Jordan–United Kingdom relations, or Anglo-Jordanian relations, refers to the relationship between the Hashemite Kingdom of Jordan and the United Kingdom of Great Britain and Northern Ireland. Both countries share a relatively close relationship because of the Hashemites, who received British help to overthrow Ottoman rule in the country during World War I.

== History ==
During World War I, the Hashemites requested help and support from the British Empire via its administration in Cairo to fight against the Ottomans. The sudden revolt led by the Hashemite family, while not be able to secure total support from other Arab tribes, played an instrumental role on the collapse of Ottoman rule in Jordan. However, the main goal of Hashemite-led revolt – a unitary and independent Arab state – was not honored by London and its French ally. Eventually Britain placed Sharif Abdullah as ruler of the Emirate of Transjordan, hoping to reduce tensions.

Until 1956, the Emirate, while governed by the Hashemites, was not fully independent of British influence. John Bagot Glubb, known as Glubb Pasha, was the de facto ruler of the country; he laid the foundation of the Arab Legion, which would eventually become the Jordanian Armed Forces. Meanwhile, Glubb Pasha played a controversial role, which is still debated in the history of modern Jordanian Kingdom. Transjordan was an integral part of Britain's informal empire. This system of indirect rule continued even after Jordan's independence in 1946.

During the Arab–Israeli War of 1948, Britain secretly favored a total Jordanian invasion of West Bank hoping to wipe out the possible creation of a Palestinian state led by Amin al-Husseini. The invasion was a success and secured British influence within Transjordan. Britain continued to support Jordan during the Jordanian Civil War against the PLO. Britain also secretly supported Israeli jets to fly in Jordan when Syria sent troops to invade the country, forcing the Syrians to retreat.

British Prime Minister James Callaghan and King Hussein formed a close working relationship in the late 1970s, however, the relationship between the United Kingdom and Jordan became even closer and warmer during the premiership of Margaret Thatcher. Contributing to this was that in the context of the Cold War, Jordan took a decisively pro-western stance. Margaret Thatcher, who was a hardline anti-communist saw this as an opening for a closer relationship with Jordan. At the same time, Jordan was looking for strong partners to bolster their own position in the region. These factors combined in such a way that the administration of Margaret Thatcher and the Jordanian government under King Hussein of Jordan began coordinating with one another and cooperating with one another on a wide variety of issues.

In late 1990 and early 1991, King Hussein of Jordan worked closely with Prime Minister John Major over the issue of what to do with Saddam Hussein's Iraq during Iraq's invasion and occupation of Kuwait. In the late 1990s and early 2000s, King Abdullah worked closely with British Prime Minister Tony Blair. Blair visited Jordan in late 2001 and King Abdullah visited Blair in London that same year. The two countries greatly enhanced their already close defense cooperation during those years. In 2002, Prime Minister Tony Blair and King Abdullah worked together to help Jordan restructure their debt.

After Brexit, ties between Jordan and the United Kingdom grew even closer under the leadership of Prime Minister Theresa May. Prime Minister Theresa May and the government of Jordan worked out a trade deal between the UK and Jordan which allowed the two countries to work together much more closely than they would have been allowed to had the United Kingdom stayed in the European Union. The trade deal went into effect on May 1 of 2021.

In August 2019, King Abdullah II visited Prime Minister Boris Johnson in London to discuss economic co-operation. Prime Minister Johnson expressed the UK's commitment to working with Jordan on issues as far ranging as the economy, COVID-19 and combatting terrorism.

== Modern ties ==
Because of this strong kinship and the later marriage between Hussein and Muna, Jordan and the United Kingdom maintain a strong relationship. British PM Theresa May considered Jordan a noteworthy ally; this was reciprocated with the same mutual trust from the Jordanian PM. Two countries also set to expand their bilateral ties.

Britain and Jordan have cultivated robust military ties that underscore their mutual commitment to regional stability and security. This relationship is exemplified through frequent joint military exercises, such as Exercise Olive Grove and Joint Theatre Entry (JTE). These exercises involve the British Army's 16 Air Assault Brigade and Jordan's Quick Reaction Force, enhancing interoperability and operational readiness in challenging environments.

The collaboration extends to advanced training programs at the King Abdullah II Special Operations Training Center (KASOTC) in Amman, which hosts international exercises like Eager Lion, involving elite units from multiple countries, including the UK. The partnership between the UK and Jordan is not limited to joint exercises but also includes strategic defense initiatives and intelligence sharing. British special forces have worked alongside Jordanian counterparts in various regional operations, highlighting the strategic importance of their alliance. This cooperation is reinforced by high-level visits and ongoing dialogue between military leaders from both nations, aiming to address shared security threats and enhance regional defense capabilities.

Both countries have been involved in mediating peace talks between Israel and Palestine. Co-operation has continued during the Gaza war since the 7 October 2023 Hamas attack on Israel, in order to provide humanitarian aid to Gazan civilians and secure the stability of the Jordanian government.

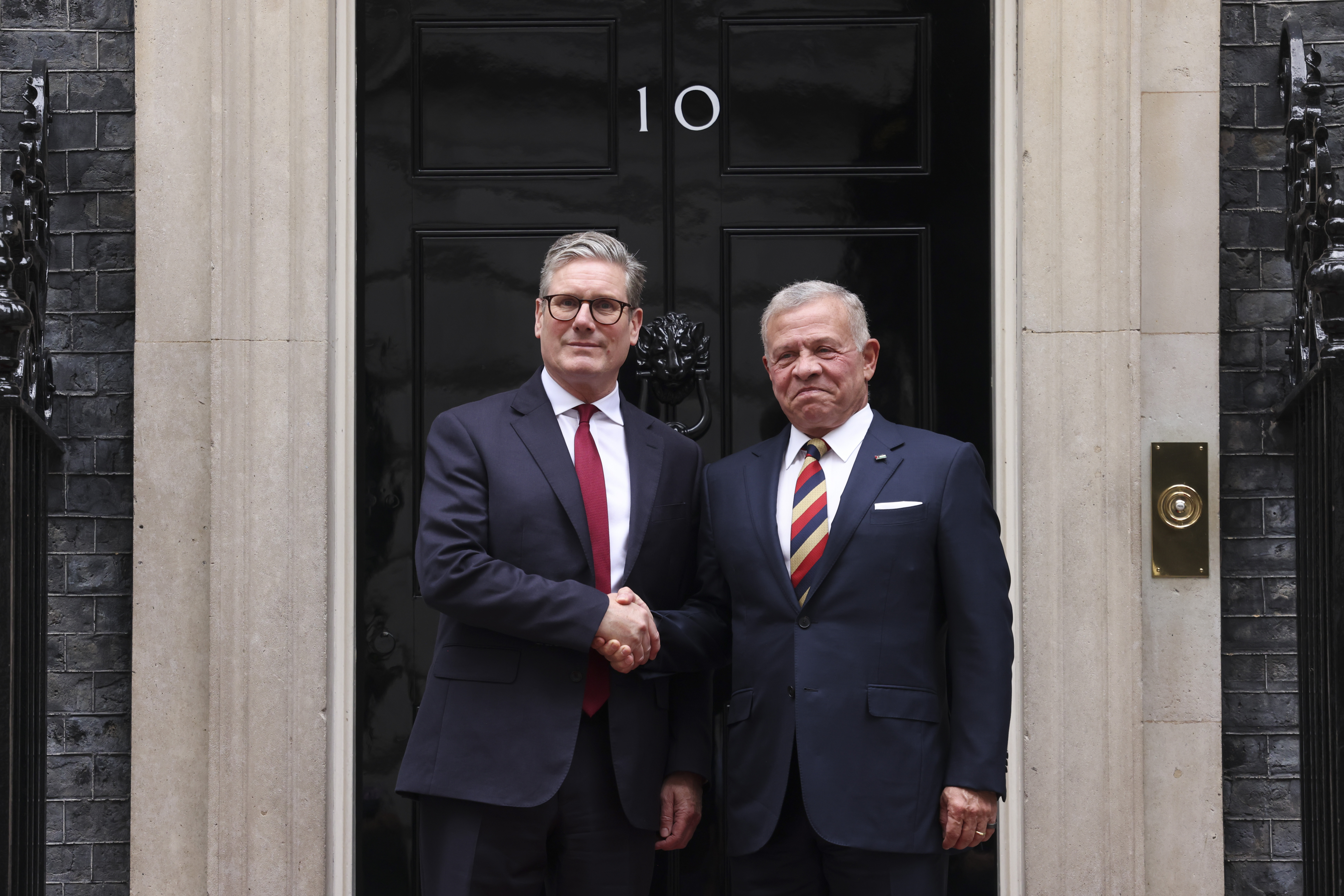
Prime Minister Keir Starmer meets the Abdullah II, King of Jordan

According from King Abdullah II, the relationship has become true partnership.

In November 2019, Jordan and the United Kingdom renewed an existing security cooperation for another three-year term for the Public Security Directorate and the General Directorate of Gendarmerie. The cooperation program aims to support Jordan's counterterrorism, public order management and the executive sector.

On 15 April 2023, King Abdullah II of Jordan met with King Charles III and attended Royal Military Academy Sandhurst’s 200th Sovereign's Parade. He presented the Al Hussein Medal to a cadet.

In June 2023, the UK announced that starting February 2024, visitors from Jordan will no longer have to apply for a visa to enter the UK, but will be able to obtain an online ETA permit for £10. In September that year, the United Kingdom suspended visa-exempt status for Jordanian nationals traveling to the UK due to an increase in asylum claims made by Jordanians.

== Economic relations ==
From 1 May 2002 until 30 December 2020, trade between Jordan and the UK was governed by the Jordan–European Union Association Agreement, while the United Kingdom was a member of the European Union. Following the withdrawal of the United Kingdom from the European Union, the UK and Jordan signed a continuity trade agreement on 5 December 2020, based on the EU free trade agreement; the agreement entered into force on 1 January 2021. Trade value between Jordan and the United Kingdom was worth £968 million in 2022.

== Jordan Embassy ==
Jordan has maintained an embassy in London since 1946. This was Jordan's second diplomatic mission abroad.

- Ambassador Manar M. Dabbas (2021–present)

== United Kingdom Embassy ==
The United Kingdom has an embassy in Amman.

- Ambassador Bridget Brind (2020–2023).
- Ambassador Philip Hall (2023–present).

== See also ==
- Foreign relations of Jordan
- Foreign relations of the United Kingdom
- Treaty of London (1946)
