= Richard Speaight =

British diplomat (1906–1976)

Richard Speaight CMG

British envoy extraordinary and minister plenipotentiary to Bulgaria
- In office 1956–1958
- Preceded by: Sir Geoffrey Furlonge
- Succeeded by: Sir Anthony Lambert

British Ambassador to Burma
- In office 1950–1953
- Preceded by: James Bowker
- Succeeded by: Paul Gore-Booth

Personal details
- Born: 12 July 1906
- Died: 17 November 1976 (aged 70)
- Children: 3
- Education: Merton College, Oxford
- Occupation: Diplomat

Richard Langford Speaight (12 July 1906 – 17 November 1976) was a British diplomat who served as ambassador to Burma from 1950 to 1953, envoy extraordinary and minister plenipotentiary to Bulgaria from 1956 to 1958.

== Early life and education ==
Speaight was born on 12 July 1906, the son of Richard Neville and Alice Langford Speaight. He was educated at Oundle School and Merton College, Oxford.

== Career ==
Speaight entered the Diplomatic Service in 1929, and was posted as third secretary to Budapest in 1931. After working at the Foreign Office from 1933 to 1935, he served as second secretary at Warsaw from 1935 to 1938 before he returned to the Foreign Office for the duration of the Second World War. From 1945 to 1948, he served as first secretary and later counsellor at Cairo before he was transferred to the Foreign Office as head of the Information Policy Department, remaining in the post from 1948 to 1950.

From 1950 to 1953, he served as Ambassador to Burma, and after a spell back in the Foreign Office as assistant under-secretary of state for foreign affairs from 1953 to 1956, he was appointed minister and plenipotentiary to Bulgaria, a post he held until 1958.

His final appointment was as director of East-West contacts at the Foreign Office from 1960 to 1966. Described as "his most enduring contribution to foreign relations", he established single-handedly, travelling throughout Europe, the framework for educational and cultural exchange between the UK and the Soviet Union and Eastern European countries at a time when they were beginning to broaden their connections with the West.

== Personal life and death ==
Speaight married Margaret Ida Hall in 1934 and they had a son and two daughters.

Speaight died on 17 November 1976, aged 70.

== Honours ==
Speaight was appointed Companion of the Order of St Michael and St George (CMG) in the 1949 New Years Honours.

== See also ==
- Bulgaria–United Kingdom relations
- Burma–United Kingdom relations

Diplomatic posts
Preceded by James Bowker	British ambassador to Burma; 1950–1953	Succeeded by Paul Gore-Booth
Preceded by Sir Geoffrey Furlonge	British envoy extraordinary and minister plenipotentiary to Bulgaria; 1956–1958	Succeeded by Sir Anthony Lambert
