= Donald Logan =

British diplomat (1917–2009)

Portrait by Walter Bird, 1960

Sir Donald Logan (25 August 1917 – 23 October 2009) was a British diplomat who was closely involved with the Suez Crisis. Following this, he was ambassador to Guinea, Bulgaria and the UN Conference on the Law of the Sea.

== Career ==
Donald Arthur Logan was educated at Solihull School and then worked in insurance, becoming a Fellow of the Chartered Insurance Institute in 1939. During World War II he served in the Royal Artillery. He joined the Foreign Service in 1945 and served at Tehran and Kuwait before being appointed in 1956 to be assistant private secretary to the Foreign Secretary, Selwyn Lloyd. In this capacity he was closely involved with the Suez Crisis and was present at the meetings leading to the Sèvres Protocol in October 1956. He said much later that he was also present at the House of Commons on 20 December 1956 and was the only person there who knew that the Prime Minister, Anthony Eden, lied to the House about Britain's foreknowledge of Israel's attack on Egypt.

Logan then served at Washington, D.C., 1958–60, then as Britain's first resident Ambassador to Guinea 1960–62, at the Foreign Office 1962–64, as Information Counsellor at the embassy in Paris 1964–70, as Ambassador to Bulgaria 1970–73, as deputy UK Representative to NATO 1973–75, and finally as leader of the UK delegations to the United Nations Conference on the Law of the Sea 1976–77 and to the Conference on Marine Living Resources of Antarctica 1978–80.

Logan was appointed CMG in the Queen's Birthday Honours of 1965 and knighted KCMG in the 1977 Silver Jubilee and Birthday Honours.

== Private life ==
In 1957, Logan married Irène Jocelyne Angèle Everts (1922), daughter of Dr Gerhard Robert Everts (1875–1942; nl:Robert Everts), who was of Dutch descent but who had become a Belgian citizen in 1898 and served in the Belgian diplomatic service from 1900, lastly as ambassador to Madrid (1932–1938).

Diplomatic posts
Preceded by Guy Clarke	Ambassador Extraordinary and Plenipotentiary at Conakry; 1960–1962	Succeeded by Hilary King
Preceded by Desmond Crawley	Ambassador Extraordinary and Plenipotentiary at Sofia; 1970–1973	Succeeded by Edwin Bolland
