= Edward Oakden =

British diplomat

Edward Oakden CMG

British Ambassador to Jordan
- In office April 2015 – April 2020
- Monarch: Elizabeth II
- Prime Minister: David Cameron; Theresa May; Boris Johnson
- Preceded by: Peter Millett
- Succeeded by: Bridget Brind

British Ambassador to the United Arab Emirates
- In office 2006–2010
- Monarch: Elizabeth II
- Prime Minister: Tony Blair; Gordon Brown
- Preceded by: Richard Makepeace
- Succeeded by: Dominic Jermey

Personal details
- Born: Edward Anthony Oakden; 3 November 1959 (age 66)
- Spouse: Florence Eid (deceased)
- Children: 3
- Education: Repton School
- Alma mater: Trinity College, Cambridge

Edward Anthony Oakden CMG is a British diplomat, the Ambassador to Jordan from 2015 to 2020.

He was educated at Repton School and Trinity College, Cambridge.

== Career ==
- In 1981 he joined the Foreign and Commonwealth Office.
- From 1984 to 1985 he was Third Secretary (later Second Secretary) in Baghdad.
- From 1985 to 1988 he was Second Secretary British Embassy in Khartoum.
- From 1988 to 1992 he was Private Secretary to the Ambassador in Washington, D.C.
- From 1992 to 1995 he was Deputy Head of the EU, External & Eastern Adriatic Department in the Foreign and Commonwealth Office.
- From 1995 to 1997 he was Private Secretary to John Major for Foreign Affairs, Defence and Northern Ireland.
- From 1997 to 1998 he was Deputy Head EU Department (Internal) in the Foreign and Commonwealth Office.
- From 1998 to 2002 he was Deputy Head of Mission in Madrid
- From 2002 to 2004 he was Director for International Security in the Foreign and Commonwealth Office.
- In 2002 he was head of Security Policy Department in the Foreign and Commonwealth Office.
- From 2004 to 2006 he was Director for Defence and Strategic Threats and Ambassador for Counter-Terrorism in the Foreign and Commonwealth Office.
- From 2006 to 2010 he was Ambassador in Abu Dhabi (United Arab Emirates).
- From 2010 to 2012 he was managing director of a Sector Group of UK Trade & Investment.
- From 2012 to 2013 he was managing director of UK Trade & Investment.
- From 2013 to 2015 he was Director of the department Middle East, with responsibility for Persian Gulf countries, Iraq and Iran. in the Foreign and Commonwealth Office.
- On 23 February 2015 he was appointed ambassador to Amman, where he is accredited from April 2015 to 2020. He was succeeded by Bridget Brind.

== Personal life ==
He was married to Dr Ana Romero (divorced 2008) and subsequently to deceased Dr Florence Eid.
