= Denis Greenhill, Baron Greenhill of Harrow =

The Right Honourable The Lord Greenhill of Harrow GCMG OBE
- Portrait by Walter Bird, 1967

Member of the House of Lords
- Lord Temporal
- Life peerage 31 January 1974 – 8 November 2000

Personal details
- Born: 7 November 1913
- Died: 8 November 2000 (aged 87)

Denis Arthur Greenhill, Baron Greenhill of Harrow GCMG OBE (7 November 1913 – 8 November 2000) was the British Permanent Under-Secretary of State for Foreign Affairs and Head of the Diplomatic Service from 1969 to 1973; a respected expert on the US, Europe and the Soviet Union, he was actively involved in setting postwar Britain's role in the world in a new direction, away from its imperial past and a compliant involvement with the United States towards a more active engagement in Europe. He served under three prime ministers, Harold Wilson, Sir Alec Douglas-Home and Edward Heath. Greenhill was noted for his poor treatment of the Chagos Islanders in August 1966, along with Sir Paul Gore-Booth, forcibly removed some 2,000 natives from their land referring to them as "some Tarzans or Men Fridays".

== Education and war record ==
Greenhill was educated at Bishop's Stortford College and Christ Church, Oxford. From 1935 to 1939, he worked for the London and North Eastern Railway. During World War II, he served in the Middle East, Far East, India and North Africa. He was promoted colonel in the Royal Engineers and was mentioned in dispatches twice.

His wife, Angela (née McCulloch), whom he married in Cairo in 1941, died in 2013.

== Career ==
He joined the Foreign Office in 1946 with the support of the Labour Foreign Secretary Ernest Bevin, who thought him an expert on oil transportation. He served as counsellor (and later minister) at the British Embassy in Washington, at the time of the Cuban Missile Crisis (1962) and the assassination of U.S. President John F. Kennedy (1963). As Britain's special envoy to Rhodesia (1972, 1976) he sought unsuccessfully to end Rhodesia's Unilateral Declaration of Independence. He was Permanent Under-Secretary (PUS) at the time of the accession of the United Kingdom to the European Communities in 1973. His appointment as PUS had been regarded with scepticism by older hands in the Whitehall establishment.

In the event, he was liked and respected by colleagues, his managerial skills were valued and his advice was highly regarded by ministers. Created a life peer in 1974, he sat as a crossbencher.

As head of the Colonial Office, Greenhill played a role in the forced deportation of Chagossians from the British Indian Ocean Territory. Responding to Permanent Under-Secretary of State Paul Gore-Booth's directive that "no indigenous population except seagulls" was to be left in the territory, Greenhill added that "[u]nfortunately along with the birds go some few Tarzans or Man Fridays whose origins are obscure, and who are hopefully being wished on to Mauritius etc. When this has been done I agree we must be very tough and a submission is being done accordingly."

His later years included roles as governor of the BBC and as a director of BAT Industries, Hawker Siddeley Group, Wellcome Foundation, Clerical Medical and General Life Assurance, S.G. Warburg and Leyland International.

== Honours and arms ==
In the 1942 New Year's Honours he was appointed an Officer of the Order of the British Empire (OBE)

In the Order of St Michael & St George he was appointed a Companion (CMG) in 1960, knighted as a Knight Commander (KCMG) in 1967, and promoted to Knight Grand Cross (GCMG) in 1972.

On 31 January 1974 he was created a Life Peer as Baron Greenhill of Harrow, of the Royal Borough of Kensington and Chelsea.

Coat of arms of Denis Greenhill, Baron Greenhill of Harrow
Crest A Demi-Griffin Gules semée of Mullets Or holding between the claws a Mullet also Or Escutcheon Vert two Barrulets Ermine in chief a Lion passant Or a Bordure Argent Supporters On either side a Griffin Gules semée of Mullets Or langued and armed Azure Motto Honos Alit Artes

== Bibliography ==
- D.Greenhill, More By Accident, (New York, 1992)
