= James Bowker =

British diplomat

Sir Sir Reginald James Bowker GBE KCMG
- Bowker in 1953

British Ambassador to Burma
- In office 1947–1950

British Ambassador to Turkey
- In office 1954–1958

British Ambassador to Austria
- In office 1958–1961

Personal details
- Born: July 2, 1901
- Died: December 15, 1983 (aged 82)
- Spouse: Elsa Gued
- Education: Charterhouse School, Oriel College, Oxford
- Occupation: Diplomat
- Awards: Knight Grand Cross of the Order of the British Empire (GBE), Knight Commander of the Order of St Michael and St George (KCMG)

Sir Reginald James Bowker GBE KCMG (2 July 1901 – 15 December 1983) was a British diplomat who was ambassador to Burma, Turkey and Austria.

== Career ==
Bowker was educated at Charterhouse School and Oriel College, Oxford. He joined the Diplomatic Services in 1925 and served in Paris, Berlin, Ankara, Oslo and Madrid before being appointed Minister in Cairo 1945–47 (second to the Ambassador, and chargé d'affaires between ambassadors); High Commissioner and, after independence in 1948, Ambassador to Burma 1947–50; an assistant Under-Secretary (head of department) for the Middle East and North Africa at the Foreign Office 1950–53; and Ambassador to Turkey 1954–58. Bowker was also the Chairperson between 1965-1972 and vice president between 1958 and 1983 in British Institute of Archeology at Ankara.

When Bowker left Turkey, The Times correspondent there commented that during his term

"he had to deal, apart from routine diplomatic matters, with the Cyprus issue and matters concerning the Baghdad pact. The measure of his success may be gauged by the fact that at his last interview with the Turkish Foreign Minister, Mr Zorlu, he received confirmation of the Turkish acceptance of cooperation with the latest British proposals on Cyprus, and that in spite of many vicissitudes the Baghdad pact remains still solid. These two main issues, which are now so important for Anglo-Turkish relations, have demanded the British Ambassador's almost constant care and attention during the past five years and it is generally recognized in Turkish and foreign diplomatic circles here that Sir James Bowker's patience and diplomatic acumen, often taxed to the utmost, are largely responsible for the present understanding and cooperation between Britain and Turkey in the Middle East."

Bowker's last post was Ambassador to Austria, 1958–61.

== Honours ==
Bowker was appointed CMG in 1945, knighted KCMG in the 1952 New Year Honours, and awarded the additional, senior knighthood of GBE when he retired in 1961.

== Elsa Bowker ==
In 1947 Bowker married Elsa Gued, whom he had met in Cairo while he was posted there. Lady Bowker (as she became) was a noted socialite. She continued to live in London after Sir James' death, and in 1992 she met, and became a confidante of, Diana, Princess of Wales. Lady Bowker died in 2000. She had no children.

Diplomatic posts
New office	Ambassador Extraordinary and Plenipotentiary at Rangoon; 1948–1950	Succeeded by Richard Speaight
Preceded by Sir Knox Helm	Ambassador Extraordinary and Plenipotentiary at Ankara; 1954–1958	Succeeded by Sir Bernard Burrows
Preceded by Sir Geoffrey Wallinger	Ambassador Extraordinary and Plenipotentiary at Vienna; 1958–1961	Succeeded by Sir Malcolm Henderson
