= Christopher Prentice =

British diplomat

His Excellency Christopher Prentice CMG
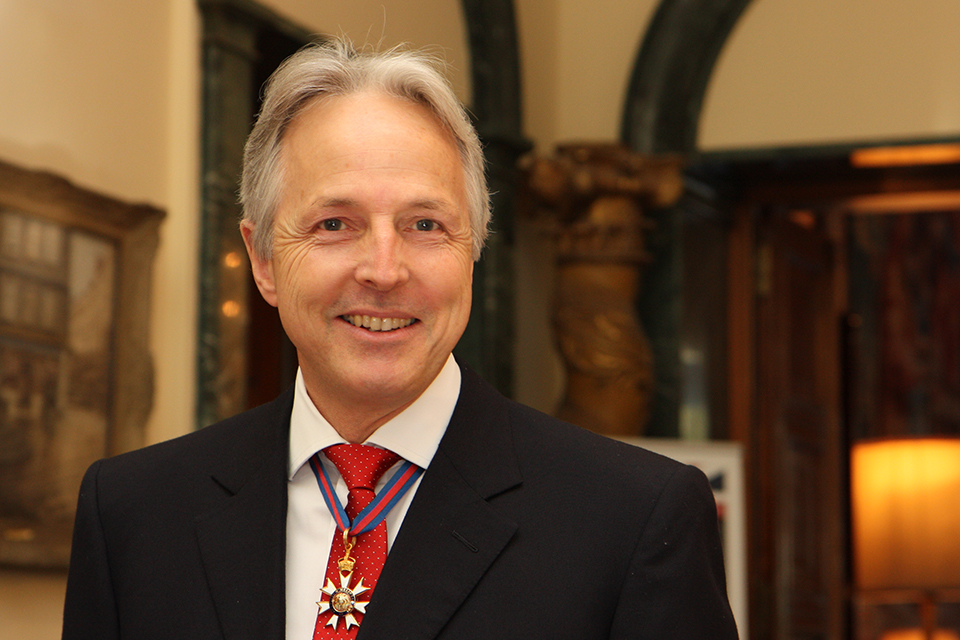
- Prentice in 2012

Her Majesty's Ambassador to Italy
- In office 2011–2016
- Preceded by: Edward Chaplin
- Succeeded by: Jill Morris

Her Majesty's Ambassador to Iraq
- In office 2007–2009
- Preceded by: Dominic Asquith
- Succeeded by: Sir John Jenkins

Her Majesty's Ambassador to Jordan
- In office 2002–2006
- Preceded by: Edward Chaplin
- Succeeded by: James Watt

Personal details
- Born: 5 September 1954 (age 72) Southwark, London
- Spouse: Marie-Josephine
- Children: 4 (2 sons, 2 daughters)
- Education: Christ Church, Oxford

Christopher Norman Russell Prentice CMG (born 5 September 1954) is a retired British diplomat. His last diplomatic post was Ambassador to Italy. He is currently Chairman of the Governors of the British Institute of Florence.

Prentice had been a British diplomat since 1977. From 2002 to 2006 he served as British Ambassador to Jordan, and from 2007 to 2009 as Ambassador to Iraq.

== Personal life ==
Born in The Borough, London, Prentice is a former cricketer who played a single first-class cricket match for Oxford University, scoring 4 and 19 in a game against Worcestershire.

Prentice speaks fluent Arabic and Hungarian. He is married to Marie-Josephine (Nina) with whom he has two sons and two daughters. One daughter, Helen, a doctor, married his predecessor's nephew, Mark, Viscount Asquith in May 2008 in Ashbury, Oxfordshire.

Prentice was appointed Companion of the Order of St Michael and St George (CMG) in the 2009 Birthday Honours.

== Career ==
On 6 January 2010, Prentice gave evidence to the Iraq Inquiry.

From March to May 2011 Prentice led the UK's diplomatic team in Libya which liaised closely with the opposition in Benghazi.

=== Career highlights ===
- 1977–1978 FCO, Desk Officer, Near East and North Africa Department
- 1985–1989 Washington, First secretary (Near East and South Asia)
- 1989–1990 FCO, Assistant Head of European Community Department (External)
- 1990–1993 FCO, Assistant Private Secretary to Foreign Secretary Douglas Hurd
- 1994–1998 Budapest, Deputy Head of Mission
- 1998–2002 FCO, Head of Near East and North Africa Department
- 2002–2006 Amman, Her Majesty's Ambassador
- 2006–2007 UK Special Representative, later FCO Co-ordinator for the Sudan Peace Process
- 2007–2009 Iraq, Her Majesty's Ambassador
- 2011–2016 Italy, Her Majesty's Ambassador
