= Edwin Bolland =

British diplomat (1922–2008)

Sir Edwin Bolland KCMG

British Ambassador to Yugoslavia
- In office 1980–1982
- Preceded by: Robert Farquharson
- Succeeded by: Kenneth Scott

British Ambassador to Bulgaria
- In office 1973–1976
- Preceded by: Donald Logan
- Succeeded by: John Cloake

Personal details
- Born: 20 October 1922
- Died: 5 December 2008 (aged 86)
- Children: 5
- Education: University College, Oxford
- Occupation: Diplomat

Sir Edwin Bolland (20 October 1922 – 5 December 2008) was a British civil servant and diplomat who served as ambassador to Bulgaria from 1973 to 1976 and ambassador to Yugoslavia from 1980 to 1982.

== Early life and education ==
Bolland was born on 20 October 1922. His father was a miner who died in an accident when he was two years old. He was educated at Morley Grammar School and University College, Oxford where he took a degree in History.

== Career ==
After serving during World War II from 1942 to 1945 with the Royal Artillery in North Africa and Italy, Bolland entered the Foreign Office in 1947. His first posting was to Moscow before he was transferred to Iran. After Iran broke off relations, he returned to the Foreign Office and worked in the research department before he was sent to Burma for three years. From 1958 to 1961, he served as information officer in Paris and then spent two years back in Moscow.

Bolland then returned to the Foreign Office, and from 1965 to 1967 served as head of the Far Eastern Department before he was sent as counsellor to Washington, a post he held from 1967 to 1971. After a year spent on secondment at St Antony’s College, Oxford, he served as Ambassador to Bulgaria from 1973 to 1976 before he was appointed head of the British delegation to the Mutual and Balanced Force Reductions Negotiations (MBFR) in Vienna, a post he held from 1976 to 1980. His final posting was as Ambassador to Yugoslavia from 1980 to 1982 which, according to The Times, "enabled him to use his accumulated experience of the communist world and mark a fulfilling end to his diplomatic career."

== Personal life and death ==
Bolland married Winifred Mellor in 1948 and they had two sons and three daughters.

Bolland died on 5 December 2008, aged 86.

== Honours ==
Bolland was appointed Companion of the Order of St Michael and St George (CMG) in the 1971 Birthday Honours, and promoted to Knight Commander (KCMG) in the 1981 Birthday Honours.

== See also ==
- United Kingdom–Yugoslavia relations
- Bulgaria–United Kingdom relations

Diplomatic posts
Preceded by Donald Logan	British Ambassador to Bulgaria; 1973–1976	Succeeded by John Cloake
Preceded by Robert Farquharson	British Ambassador to Yugoslavia; 1980–1982	Succeeded by Kenneth Scott
