= Denis Wright =

British diplomat (1911–2005)

Sir Denis Wright GCMG
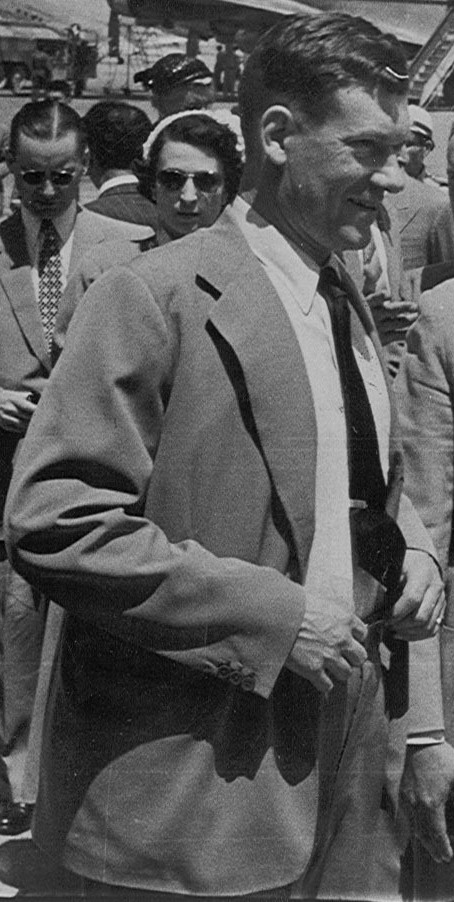

British Ambassador to Iran
- In office 1963–1971
- Preceded by: Sir Geoffrey Harrison
- Succeeded by: Sir Peter Ramsbotham

British Ambassador to Ethiopia
- In office 1959–1962
- Preceded by: Geoffrey Furlonge
- Succeeded by: Sir John Russell

Personal details
- Born: Denis Arthur Hepworth Wright; 23 March 1911 Kingston upon Thames, Surrey, England
- Died: 18 May 2005 (aged 94) Haddenham, Buckinghamshire, England
- Spouse: Iona Carmen Craig (m. 1939)
- Relations: Michael Wright (brother)
- Education: St Edmund Hall, Oxford
- Occupation: Diplomat

Sir Denis Arthur Hepworth Wright, GCMG (23 March 1911 – 18 May 2005) was a British diplomat. A long-serving ambassador to Iran, Wright's expertise and knowledge of Iran and Persian culture led him to write and edit several books on the region, as well as conduct a covert mission to inform the deposed Shah of Iran that he would not be granted asylum in Britain.

== Early life and education ==
Wright was born in 1911 in Kingston upon Thames (then in the county of Surrey), at the house of his father's parents. His father, Arthur Edgar Wright, was assistant director of public works in Hong Kong, where Wright spent his childhood attending the Peak School. In 1921, he returned with his family to England, where he attended Brentwood School in Essex.

From 1930 to 1932, Wright studied at the University of Oxford, reading modern history at St Edmund Hall, in which he graduated with a second-class degree. At the Oxford University Labour Club, Wright met Iona Craig, and they became engaged in 1938.

== Diplomatic career ==
Wright unsuccessfully applied for a cadetship with the Colonial Service, then worked for a time in advertising and for the Gallahers tobacco company. Whilst on holiday in Romania in 1939, he was recruited by the British consul in Constanța to undertake economic work for the embassy while Romania sat on the brink of war. His fiancée Iona joined him in Romania, and they were married at the consulate that year. In 1940, Wright was posted to the British embassy in Bucharest, then left Romania in 1941 when the country joined the Axis Powers and ended relations with Britain. Wright was then transferred to Turkey, where he served as vice-consul in Trabzon, earning a commendation from the embassy in Ankara, and in 1943, he was appointed acting consul in the port city of Mersin.

At the end of World War II, Wright returned to London where he worked for the Ottoman Bank, however he soon resigned and joined the British Foreign Service. His first posting was in Belgrade from 1946 to 1948, then as a trade consul in Chicago. In 1951, he returned to the UK to serve as the head of economic relations for the Foreign Office. In 1953, he was sent to Iran to re-open the British embassy there, after the overthrow of Mohammad Mosaddegh's government in a coup d'etat, which began his long association with the country.

Appointed CMG in 1954, Wright was granted his first ambassadorship in 1959, becoming the British Ambassador to Ethiopia. He returned to the Foreign Office briefly, and then returned to Iran as the British Ambassador in 1963. He was knighted KCMG in 1961, and elevated to GCMG on his retirement in 1971.

== Post-retirement ==
After retiring from the Foreign Service, Wright used his expertise on Iran and Persia to author two books on the region: The English Amongst the Persians: During the Qajar Period 1787-1921 (1977) and The Persians Amongst the English: Episodes in Anglo-Persian History (1985). He also contributed to the 1969 book Persia by James Morris and Roger Wood. In 1972, he was made an Honorary Fellow of his old Oxford college, St Edmund Hall, and of St Antony's College in 1975. He was also a contributor to the Encyclopædia Iranica.

In May 1979, Wright was asked by Sir Anthony Parsons of the Foreign Office to carry out a covert mission due to his close relationship with the last Shah of Iran, Mohammad Reza Pahlavi, who had just been deposed in the Iranian Revolution. The new British Prime Minister, Margaret Thatcher, was concerned that she had given the Shah the impression (whilst Leader of the Opposition) that he would be granted asylum in the UK—unable to convince her Cabinet and the Foreign Office to grant such a request, Thatcher wished to inform the Shah of the news via a trusted emissary (Wright). Several sources, including newspaper obituaries of Wright, say that their meeting took place on Paradise Island in the Bahamas, with Wright travelling under the false identity of "Edward Wilson". However, in his memoir Constantinople and Istanbul: 72 Years of Life in Turkey, Wright's former colleague in Ankara, Sidney Nowill, asserted that these stories were "contradictory and unbelievable"—that the Shah was imprisoned in Tehran at the time (although the false identity part was true, as Wright was concerned about possible ramifications due to his directorship of the Shell Oil Company)—and were probably concocted for the press by the D-Notice Committee, although the BBC and The Guardian reported in 2009 that the release of official documents from The National Archives confirmed Wright's meeting with the Shah in the Bahamas.

Wright died from prostate cancer at his home in Haddenham, Buckinghamshire on 18 May 2005.

Diplomatic posts
Preceded by Geoffrey Furlonge	British Ambassador to Ethiopia; 1959–1962	Succeeded by Sir John Russell
Preceded by Sir Geoffrey Harrison	British Ambassador to Iran; 1963–1971	Succeeded by Sir Peter Ramsbotham
