= Desmond Crawley =

British diplomat

Desmond John Chetwode Crawley, CMG CVO (2 June 1917 – 26 April 1993) was a British diplomat, who served as administrator under the Raj to Commonwealth diplomat, from the Asian sub-continent to West Africa, and, finally, from behind the Iron Curtain to the Vatican.

He was educated at King's Ely and Queen's College, Oxford. He entered the Indian Civil Service in 1939 and served in the Madras Presidency. When India became independent in 1947 he entered the Commonwealth Relations Office in London. He served in Calcutta and Washington, and was Principal Private Secretary to the Secretary of State for Commonwealth Relations 1952–1953. Crawley was Deputy High Commissioner in Lahore, Pakistan, 1958–61; attended the Imperial Defence College in 1962; was British High Commissioner in Sierra Leone 1963–66 and Ambassador to Bulgaria 1966–70; and finally was Envoy Extraordinary and Minister Plenipotentiary to the Holy See from 1970 to 1975.

Crawley was appointed a Companion of the Order of St Michael and St George (CMG) in the 1964 New Year Honours,

== See also ==
- British Ambassadors to the Holy See

Diplomatic posts
Preceded by John Johnston	High Commissioner to Sierra Leone; 1963 – 1966	Succeeded by Stanley Fingland
Preceded by William Harpham	Ambassador Extraordinary and Plenipotentiary to Bulgaria; 1966 – 1970	Succeeded by Donald Logan
Preceded by Sir Michael Williams	Envoy Extraordinary and Minister Plenipotentiary to the Holy See; 1970 – 1975	Succeeded by Dugald Malcolm
