= Douglas Busk =

British diplomat and mountaineer (1906–1990)

Douglas Busk KCMG
- Sir Douglas Laird Busk in 1960 (by Walter Bird, National Portraits Gallery: NPG x166281)
- Born: 15 July 1906; London
- Died: 11 December 1990 (aged 84); Chilbolton, Hampshire
- Education: New College, Oxford
- Occupations: diplomat, mountaineer and geographer
- Family: Charles A. Joy (maternal grandfather)
- Honours: KCMG

Douglas Laird Busk KCMG (1906–1990) was a British diplomat, mountaineer and geographer.

== Personal life ==
Busk was born in London on 15 July 1906, the elder son of John Laird Busk (a descendent of Wadsworth Busk) and Eleanor Joy (daughter of Charles A. Joy). The family settled in Westerham, Kent in 1917. His father died in 1922 when he was a teenager. In the same year Francis Younghusband, the former Asian adventurer and political officer, moved to Westerham with his family; Younghusband's daughter Eileen soon developed a friendship with Busk's mother.

Busk was educated at Eton, the Lyceum Alpinum Zuoz and New College, Oxford, also spending some time at Princeton University. He married Bridget Hemsley Thompson in 1937, and they had two daughters. Bridget was an artist and her line drawings illustrate his books The Delectable Mountains and The Fountain of the Sun . He died on 11 December 1990, aged 84, at Chilbolton.

== Diplomatic career ==
Busk joined the diplomatic service in 1927 and served in several countries in a junior role, including Iran, Hungary, Japan and Turkey.

He was posted to Tokyo in November 1941, just before the attack on Pearl Harbor. Ten days after his arrival, when the Ambassador was at the American Embassy, he "was pressed to accept an ideographic Declaration of War". Along with all other Allied diplomats in Japanese territory he was interned for 8 months until Allied and Japanese diplomats were formally exchanged in 1942. On 30 July 1942, Craigie, the ambassador, and the other embassy staff left Japan on board the Tatsuta Maru, returning to Britain via Lourenço Marques in East Africa (today Maputo, Mozambique).

Whilst in Turkey Busk employed a nursemaid to look after their children, the nursemaid was a mistress of the nazi spy Elyesa Bazna and Busk went on to employ Bazna as a valet. Busk was first secretary and head of chancery at the embassy and he introduced Bazna to Hughe Knatchbull-Hugessen, the ambassador, who went on to employ Bazna as chauffeur and valet from November 1943 to March 1944.

Busk also served in Iraq and from 1946 to 1948, he was acting head of mission from late 1947-early 1948 because the ambassador was unwell, this meant that he had responsibility for the Baghdad side of UK-Iraq relations which included the Iraqi monarch's plans to renew the Anglo-Iraqi Treaty of 1930, an intention which led to the Al-Wathbah uprising.

He served as Britain's ambassador to Ethiopia (1952–1956), Finland (1958–1960) and Venezuela (1961–1964). In the early 1960s Venezuela had just emerged from rule by a military junta, the 1963 Venezuelan general election was held on 1 December. On December 4, in a wave of incidents in Caracas, terrorists launched a machine-gun attack on the embassy from a passing car, Lady Busk was inside the residence but was uninjured.

== Mountaineering ==
Busk was a notable mountaineer, gaining membership of the Alpine Club while an undergraduate, after making the first winter ascent of the north face of Pic du Midi d'Ossau.

Towards the end of his time at Princeton he visited the Rockies and Banff on a climbing tour. Whilst in the Ramparts, they attempted the first ascent of Redoubt Peak, 10,220 feet (3,120 m), a mountain on which two climbers, F. H. Slark and F. Rutishauser, had disappeared without trace the previous year. Busk was climbing with Joe Johnson and Hans Fuhrer. On a ledge Fuhrer found "Slark’s rucksack with a pair of mountain boots in addition to the rest of the stuff; these were small boots, and from his size Slark must have had big feet, so I think it probable that Rutis was climbing in stockinged feet on the cliffs directly below the summit when they fell. It was a place we looked at in horror, and circumnavigated. I am firmly convinced that they fell and were not struck by falling stones", on the summit they found a tin containing the names of the missing climbers. Busk inferred that Slark and Rutishauser ascended the W. ridge and were trying to descend the S. face when the accident occurred. Busk's party also made the first ascent of Casemate, 10,160 feet (3,100 m).

Busk wrote that he tried to "make the most and hope for the best of any post" and during each diplomatic posting he found time to explore some of the 'local' mountaineering challenges. It was not unknown for Busk to recruit mountaineers passing through his postings to join him on such excursions.

He recounted some of his mountain activities in Iran in the Alpine Journal and also those in Ethiopia, including the Batu Range which, as far as Busk could ascertain, had not previously been visited by any European party. Whilst stationed in Ethiopia he travelled by road from Addis Ababa to the Ruwenzori Mountains where, with Arthur Firmin, he climbed two previously unidentified peaks on the south ridge of Mount Stanley. Whilst in Venezuela in the early 1960s, he made regular visits to the Sierra Nevada de Mérida and one of his visits there resulted in the first ascents of the rock spire of El Vertigo and of the south-west face of El Abanic, one member of that party was George Band who had made the first ascent of Kangchenjunga.

His obituary in The Times said that his "greatest contribution" was his work as chairman of the library of the Alpine Club, culminating in the production of a 600-page catalogue and the 1981 exhibition "The Treasures of the Alpine Club".

== Recognition ==
Busk was appointed Knight Commander of the Order of St Michael and St George (KCMG) in the 1959 Birthday Honours.

The Royal Geographical Society, of which he was honorary vice-president, awards an annual Busk Medal named in his honour.

== Selected publications ==
- Busk, Douglas (1946). The Delectable Mountains: illustrated by 43 of the author's own photographs and with maps by the author; the sketches by Bridget Busk. Hodder & Stoughton.
- Busk, Douglas (1957). The Fountain of the Sun. Unfinished journeys in Ethiopia and the Ruwenzoi. Max Parrish.
- Busk, Douglas (1965). The curse of tongues. Pall Mall Press.
- Busk, Douglas (1967). The craft of diplomacy : how to run a diplomatic service. Praeger Press.
- Busk, Douglas (1967). The craft of diplomacy : mechanics and development of national representation overseas. Pall Mall Press.
- Busk, Douglas; Devies, Lucien; Germain, Félix; Germain, Jeanne; Busk, Bridget (1974). Armand Charlet: portrait d'un guide. Grenoble: Arthaud. ISBN 2700300599. On Armand Charlet

Diplomatic posts
Preceded by Sir John Walker	Ambassador Extraordinary and Plenipotentiary to the Republic of Venezuela; 1961–1964	Succeeded by Sir Anthony Lincoln
Preceded by Sir Michael Creswell	Ambassador to Finland; 1958–1960	Succeeded by Sir Con O'Neill
Preceded by Daniel Lascelles	Ambassador Extraordinary and Plenipotentiary to Ethiopia; 1952–1956	Succeeded by Geoffrey Furlonge
