= Christopher Battiscombe =

British diplomat

His Excellency Christopher Battiscombe CMG

Her Majesty's Ambassador to Jordan
- In office 1997–2000
- Preceded by: Peter Hinchcliffe
- Succeeded by: Edward Chaplin

Her Majesty's Ambassador to Algeria
- In office 1990–1994
- Preceded by: Patrick Eyers
- Succeeded by: Peter James Marshall

Personal details
- Born: 27 April 1940 (age 86)
- Spouse: Brigid Lunn (m. 1972)
- Children: 2 (1 daughter, 1 son)
- Education: Middle East Centre for Arab Studies
- Occupation: Diplomat

Christopher Charles Richard Battiscombe CMG (born 27 April 1940) is a retired British diplomat. After he retired from the foreign service he became director general of the society of London Art Dealers.

He was educated at Wellington College, Berkshire and New College, Oxford.

== Career ==
- On 19 August 1963 he joined the Foreign and Commonwealth Office as 3rd Secretary.
- In 1965 he was Third Secretary in Kuwait City (Kuwait).
- In 1969 he was Assistant Private Secretary to Frederick Lee, Baron Lee of Newton, the Chancellor of the Duchy of Lancaster.
- In 1971 he was employed at the British delegation to the Organisation for Economic Co-operation and Development in Paris.
- In 1974 he was First Secretary in the British mission in New York City.
- In 1978 he was employed at the Foreign and Commonwealth Office.
- From 1981 to 1984 he was Commercial Counselor in Cairo (Egypt).
- From 1984 to 1986 he was Commercial Counselor in Paris (France).
- From 1987 to 1990 he was Head of Permanent Under-Secretarys Department, Foreign and Commonwealth Office.
- From 1990 to 1994 he was Ambassador in Algiers (Algeria).
- From 1994 to 1997 he was Assistant Under Secretary for Foreign and Commonwealth Affairs (Public Department)/Director, Public Services.
- From 1997 to 2000 he was Ambassador in Amman Jordan.
