= List of ambassadors of the United Kingdom to Jordan =

His Majesty's Ambassador to Jordan
- Coat of arms of the United Kingdom
- Incumbent; Philip Hall since 2023
- Style: His Excellency
- Residence: Amman
- Inaugural holder: Albert Abramson; First Resident in Amman to Transjordan Sir Alec Kirkbride; First Ambassador
- Formation: 1921
- Website: UK and Jordan

The ambassador of the United Kingdom to Jordan is the United Kingdom of Great Britain and Northern Ireland's (UK) foremost diplomatic representative in the Hashemite Kingdom of Jordan, and in charge of the UK's diplomatic mission in Amman.

== List of heads of mission ==
=== Residents in Amman to Transjordan ===
- Apr 1921 – 21 Nov 1921: Albert Abramson
- 21 Nov 1921 – Apr 1924: St John Philby
- Aug 1924 – Mar 1939: Charles Henry Fortnom Cox
- Mar 1939 – 17 Jun 1946: Alec Kirkbride

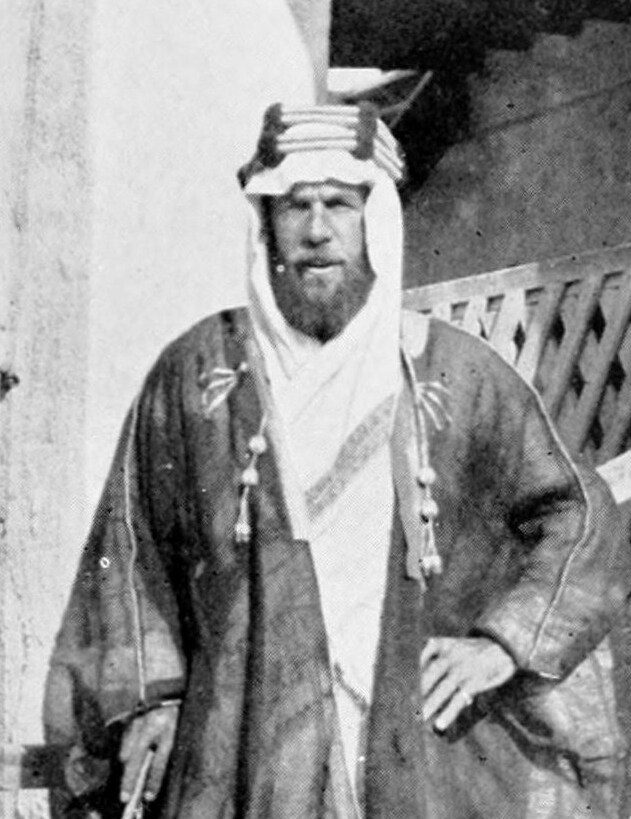
St John Philby

=== Ambassadors to Jordan ===
- 1946–1952: Sir Alec Kirkbride
- 1952–1954: Geoffrey Furlonge
- 1954–1956: Sir Charles Duke
- 1956–1959: Sir Charles Johnston
- 1960–1962: John Henniker-Major
- 1962–1966: Sir Roderick Parkes
- 1966–1970: Sir Philip Adams
- 1970–1972: John Phillips
- 1972–1975: Glencairn Balfour Paul
- 1975–1979: Sir John Campbell Moberly
- 1979–1984: Alan Urwick
- 1984–1988: Sir John Coles
- 1988–1991: Anthony Reeve
- 1991–1993: Patrick Eyers
- 1993–1997: Peter Hinchcliffe
- 1997–2000: Christopher Battiscombe
- 2000–2002: Edward Chaplin
- 2002–2006: Christopher Prentice
- 2006–2011: James Watt
- 2011–2015: Peter Millett
- 2015–2020: Edward Oakden
- 2020–2023: Bridget Brind
- 2023–present: Philip Hall

== Bibliography ==
- Kamal S. Salibi (15 December 1998). The Modern History of Jordan. I.B.Tauris. p. 96. ISBN 978-1-86064-331-6.
