= David Gore-Booth =

British diplomat

Sir David Alwyn Gore-Booth KCMG KCVO (15 May 1943 – 31 October 2004) was a British diplomat, who served in the FCO from 1964 until 1998.

Sir David was appointed HM Ambassador to Saudi Arabia in 1993, before his final posting as British High Commissioner in New Delhi 1996–1998. His father, Paul Gore-Booth, Baron Gore-Booth was also High Commissioner to India 1960–1965.

== Family and education ==
Of Anglo-Irish extraction, the Gore-Booth family was formerly seated at Artarman and Lissadell, and were created baronets in 1760.

Educated at Eton College and Christ Church, Oxford, David Gore-Booth was a twin son of Paul Gore-Booth, Baron Gore-Booth, and married firstly in 1964, Jillian Sarah, née Valpy (marriage dissolved 1970), by whom he had one son: Paul Wyatt Julian Gore-Booth (heir presumptive to the baronetcy); he married secondly in 1977, Mary Elisabeth Janet, daughter of Sir David Muirhead with a step son.

== Honours ==
- – Order of St Michael and St George
  - Knight Commander (1997),
  - Companion (1990)
- – Royal Victorian Order
  - KCVO (1997)

== See also ==
- Booth baronets
- Gore baronets

Diplomatic posts
Preceded by Sir Nicholas Fenn	High Commissioner to India; 1996–1998	Succeeded by Sir Rob Young
