= John Cloake =

British diplomat and historian (1924–2014)

John Cecil Cloake
- Born: 2 December 1924; Wimbledon, London, England
- Died: 9 July 2014 (aged 89)
- Education: King's College School, Wimbledon, London; Peterhouse, Cambridge
- Occupations: Ambassador of the United Kingdom to Bulgaria; Historian
- Spouse: Margaret Thomure ("Molli") Morris (1956–2008; her death)
- Children: One son: John Newling Cloake OBE
- Writing career
- Subjects: Local history and biography
- Notable awards: CMG 1977; FSA 1977; Hon. DLitt. Kingston 2004

John Cloake CMG FSA (2 December 1924 – 9 July 2014) was a historian and author of several works mostly relating to the local history of Richmond upon Thames and surrounding areas. He was also a former United Kingdom diplomatic representative in Bulgaria.

== Early life, education and military service ==
The son of Dr Cecil Stedman Cloake and Maude Osborne Newling, John Cloake was born and brought up in Wimbledon, London, where he attended King's College School. During and immediately after World War II Cloake served in the British Army as lieutenant in the Royal Engineers in India and Japan. After the war he completed his studies, reading History at Cambridge University.

== Diplomatic career ==
In August 1948 Cloake commenced a career in the United Kingdom's Diplomatic Service, within the Foreign Office. Following an initial period in the Information Research Department, he was appointed Third Secretary in Baghdad in 1949 supporting Henry Mack and Jack Troutbeck. A posting to Saigon followed in 1951, first as Third Secretary then as Second Secretary. In 1956 he became Private Secretary to Permanent Under-Secretary Ivone Kirkpatrick during the time of the Suez Crisis, then to Douglas Dodds-Parker and, after that, to Ian Harvey. In 1958 he transferred to New York as Commercial Consul. He then worked in Moscow and in Tehran. His final post was in Sofia as Ambassador of the United Kingdom to Bulgaria where he was in charge of the UK's diplomatic mission between 1976 and 1980.

== Local historian ==
Cloake and his wife moved to Richmond in 1962 and soon he began researching the area's rich local history. Cloake was a leading participant in the foundation of the Richmond Local History Society and of the Museum of Richmond of which he was its first chairman. He was elected a Fellow of the Society of Antiquaries of London in March 1998 (Note: "Mr John C Cloake CMG FSA". Fellows Directory. Society of Antiquaries of London. The entry reads: "Mr John C Cloake CMG FSA Degrees, distinctions and post nominals: MA Hon DLitt, CMG, FSA Date of election: 30 April 1998".) and was awarded an Honorary DLitt. from Kingston University in 2004.

Cloake appeared as a local history expert in series 5, episode 1 of Time Team, Channel 4's TV programme on archaeology, which revealed the footings of the lost Richmond Palace. It was first broadcast on 4 January 1998.

== Honours ==
In 1977, Cloake was appointed a Companion of the Order of St Michael and St George (CMG).

== Works ==
Many articles by Cloake were published in Richmond History, the Journal of the Richmond Local History Society (including a contribution to the 2015 issue, published after his death). As well as a biography of Sir Gerald Templer, who was Britain's High Commissioner to Malaya from 1952 to 1954 and military adviser to the Prime Minister, Anthony Eden, during the Suez Crisis, he wrote several books relating to the history of Richmond and its vicinity:

- Cloake, John; Wright, John; Albrecht, Sally, eds. (1976). Richmond, Surrey, as it was. Hendon Publishing Company. ISBN 978-0-86067-004-9.
- Cloake, John (1982). The Growth of Richmond. Richmond Society History Section. ISBN 978-0-9508198-0-8.
- Cloake, John (1985). Templer, Tiger of Malaya: The Life of Field Marshal Sir Gerald Templer. Harrap. ISBN 978-0-245-54204-6.
- Cloake, John (1989). Richmond's Links with North America. Richmond Local History Society. ISBN 978-0-9508198-4-6.
- Cloake, John (1990). Richmond's Great Monastery: The Charterhouse of Jesus of Bethlehem of Shene. Richmond Local History Society. ISBN 978-0-9508198-6-0.
- Cloake, John (1991). Richmond Past: A Visual History of Richmond, Kew, Petersham and Ham. London: Historical Publications. ISBN 978-0-948667-14-5. Recounts the history of the Richmond area – including Kew, Petersham and Ham – from 1501 and is illustrated with drawings, paintings and photographs.
- Cloake, John (1992). Royal Bounty: The Richmond Parish Lands Charity 1786–1991. Trustees of Richmond Parish Lands Charity. ISBN 978-0-9519896-0-9.
- Cloake, John (1995). The Palaces and Parks of Richmond and Kew 1: The Palaces of Shene and Richmond. Phillimore & Co Ltd. ISBN 978-0-85033-976-5.
- Cloake, John (1996). The Palaces and Parks of Richmond and Kew 2: Richmond Lodge and the Kew Palaces. Phillimore & Co Ltd. ISBN 978-1-86077-023-4. OCLC 36045530. OL 8627654M.
- Cloake, John (1999). Richmond Past and Present in Old Photographs (Britain in Old Photographs). Sutton Publishing Ltd. ISBN 978-0-7509-1842-8.
- Cloake, John (2001). Cottages and Common Fields of Richmond and Kew. Phillimore & Co Ltd. ISBN 978-1-86077-195-8.
- Cloake, John (2001). Richmond Palace: Its History and Its Plan. Richmond Local History Society. ISBN 978-0-9522099-6-6.

== Personal life ==
While in Saigon, in 1952, he met Margaret ("Molli") Morris (1929–2008) from Washington, D.C., who was serving there in the United States Diplomatic Service, and they were married in Cambridge four years later in 1956. She died in 2008.

== Death and legacy ==
Cloake died on 9 July 2014.

In 2016, the Museum of Richmond displayed, in partnership with the Orleans House Gallery and the Riverside Gallery, Images of Richmond, an exhibition of prints he collected that depict the local area. Seventy-eight of these prints now form the Cloake Collection at the Orleans House Gallery.

The Royal Asiatic Society holds archival material by Cloake and his wife on Azerbaijan and Iran.

== Notes ==
Diplomatic posts
Preceded by Edwin Bolland	Ambassador Extraordinary and Plenipotentiary at Sofia; 1976–1980	Succeeded by Giles Bullard
