= William Harpham =

British diplomat (1906–1999)

Sir William Harpham KBE CMG

British Ambassador to Bulgaria
- In office 1964–1966
- Preceded by: Anthony Lincoln
- Succeeded by: Desmond Crawley

Personal details
- Born: 3 December 1906 Grimsby
- Died: 5 June 1999 (aged 92)
- Children: 2
- Education: Christ's College, Cambridge
- Occupation: Diplomat and civil servant

Sir William Harpham (3 December 1906 – 5 June 1999) was a British civil servant and diplomat who served as the Deputy Permanent Representative of the United Kingdom to the Organisation for European Co-operation (OEEC) from 1953 to 1956 and ambassador to Bulgaria from 1964 to 1966.

== Early life and education ==
Harpham was born in Grimsby on 3 December 1906, the son of W. Harpham, a police inspector and N. Harpham (née Stout). He was educated at Wintringham Secondary School, Grimsby, where he won a scholarship to Christ's College, Cambridge and gained a First in Spanish.

== Career ==
Harpham joined the Department of Overseas Trade in 1929 as a cadet, and was appointed an intelligence officer. He was then posted to Brussels as commercial secretary, and then to Rome before he returned to the Department of Overseas Trade where, in 1936, he was appointed private secretary to the Parliamentary Secretary. In 1937 and 1939, he was seconded for service to the League of Nations in Geneva.

In 1940, and for most of the war, he was at Cairo as commercial secretary involved in aspects of economic warfare, and in 1944, at Beirut as first secretary, before he was posted to Berne in 1947 when he was promoted to counsellor. In 1950, he was transferred to the Foreign Office where he served as head of the General Department handling European post-war reconstruction matters.

In 1953, he was deputy representative of the United Kingdom permanent delegation to the Organisation for European European Co-operation (OEEC) based in Paris with the diplomatic rank of minister. There he assisted with the implementation of the Marshall Plan established to administer American aid; was involved in the settlement of the Anglo-Icelandic fisheries dispute; and his joint report containing recommendations on the uses of atomic energy helped establish the International Atomic Energy Agency (IAEA) to promote its peaceful use.

In 1956, he was appointed minister at Tokyo, and on several occasions acted as chargé d’affaires there. From 1959 to 1963, he served as minister (economic) at Paris where he was involved with Britain's application for membership of the Common Market.

In 1964, Harpham was appointed envoy extraordinary and minister plenipotentiary to Bulgaria, but as the Legation was immediately upgraded to an Embassy he became the UK's first ambassador to Bulgaria, a post he held until 1966. According to one newspaper article, during his posting, "he revealed his true strength as a doggedly patient builder of bridges between different cultures." He was credited with creating new commercial, educational, cultural links during the Cold War period with Bulgaria, and with Eastern Europe. This included encouraging oil companies to explore for oil in the area, recommending the Bulgarian Black Sea coast as a tourist destination for British tourists, and arranging the Royal Ballet's first ever visit to Sofia in 1966. According to The Times, "His evident sincerity enabled him to succeed in this as few others could hope to do." In 1969, he was decorated by the country's Communist president for his efforts in promoting friendly relations, considered a remarkable achievement only a year after the Soviet's invasion of Czechoslovakia, and then ten years later was further decorated with Bulgaria's highest state award, the Order of Stara Planina.

After retiring in 1969, Harpham was persuaded by the government to create a new centre in London to further contacts which he had established between Britain and countries of Eastern Europe behind the Iron Curtain. The Great Britain-East Europe Centre was headed by Harpham, as director, who worked there for over a decade "breaking new ground", and who made "an important but largely unsung contribution to the change in East-West climate that led to the events of 1989 and to the transformation of Britain's relationships with Eastern Europe." After he finally retired in 1980, he continued to maintain close relations with Bulgaria.

== Personal life and death ==
Harpham married Isabelle Marie Sophie Droz, granddaughter of the former president of Switzerland, Numa Droz, in 1943, having first met her while serving at the League of Nations in Geneva in the late 1930s. They had one son and one daughter.

Harpham died on 5 June 1999, aged 92.

== Honours ==
- Harpham was appointed Companion of the Order of St Michael and St George (CMG) in the 1953 Coronation Honours.
- He was appointed Officer of the Order of the British Empire (OBE) in the 1948 New Year Honours, and promoted to Knight Commander (KBE) in the 1966 New Year Honours.
- He was awarded the Order of Madara Horseman, Bulgaria, in 1969.
- He was awarded the Order of Stara Planina (First Class) in 1979.

== See also ==
- Bulgaria–United Kingdom relations

Diplomatic posts
Preceded by Anthony Lincoln	British Ambassador to Bulgaria; 1964–1966	Succeeded by Desmond Crawley
