= James Watt (diplomat) =

British diplomat

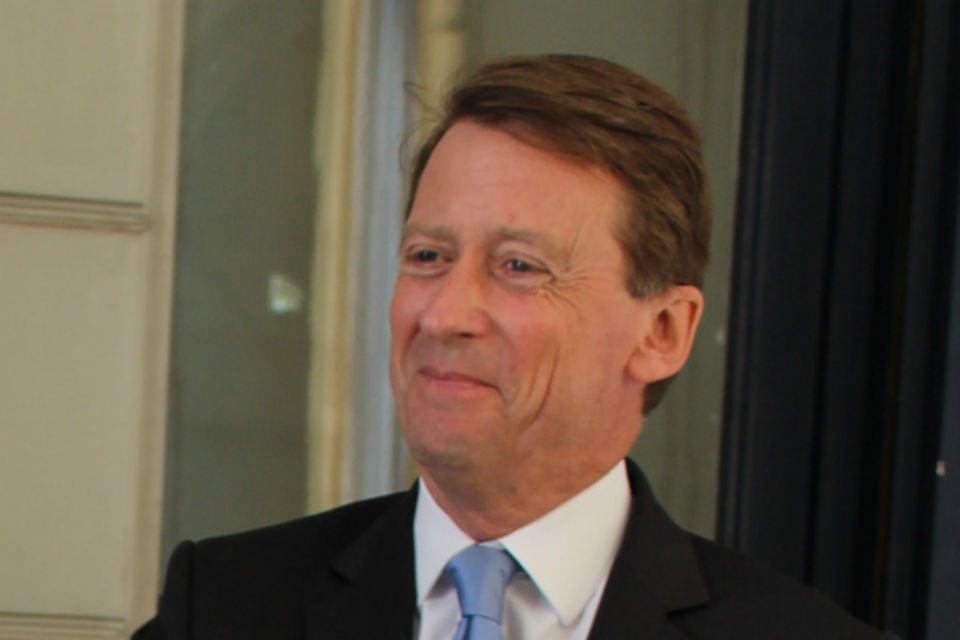
James Watt

James Wilfrid Watt CVO (born 5 November 1951) is a British former diplomat who was ambassador to Lebanon, Jordan and Egypt.

== Career ==
James Wilfrid Watt was educated at Ampleforth College and The Queen's College, Oxford. He worked for Kleinwort Benson 1974–75 and was a freelance broadcaster and interpreter in Madrid 1975–77, then joined the Diplomatic Service. He studied at the Middle East Centre for Arabic Studies, then served at Abu Dhabi, the United Nations in New York and at the Foreign and Commonwealth Office (FCO). He was Consul-General and deputy Head of Mission at Amman 1992–96 and deputy High Commissioner at Islamabad 1996–98, then took a sabbatical year at the School of Oriental and African Studies 1999–2000. He was Director of Consular Affairs at the FCO 2000–03, Ambassador to Lebanon 2003–06 and Ambassador to Jordan 2006–11 before being appointed Ambassador to Egypt from March 2011 to 2014.

Watt was appointed CVO in 1997 after Queen Elizabeth made a state visit to Pakistan.

Diplomatic posts
Preceded by Richard Kinchen	Ambassador to Lebanon; 2003–2006	Succeeded by Frances Guy
Preceded by Christopher Prentice	Ambassador to Jordan; 2006–2011	Succeeded by Peter Millett
Preceded by Sir Dominic Asquith	Ambassador to Egypt; 2011–2014	Succeeded by John Casson
