= Edward Chaplin (diplomat) =

British diplomat

Edward Chaplin CMG OBE
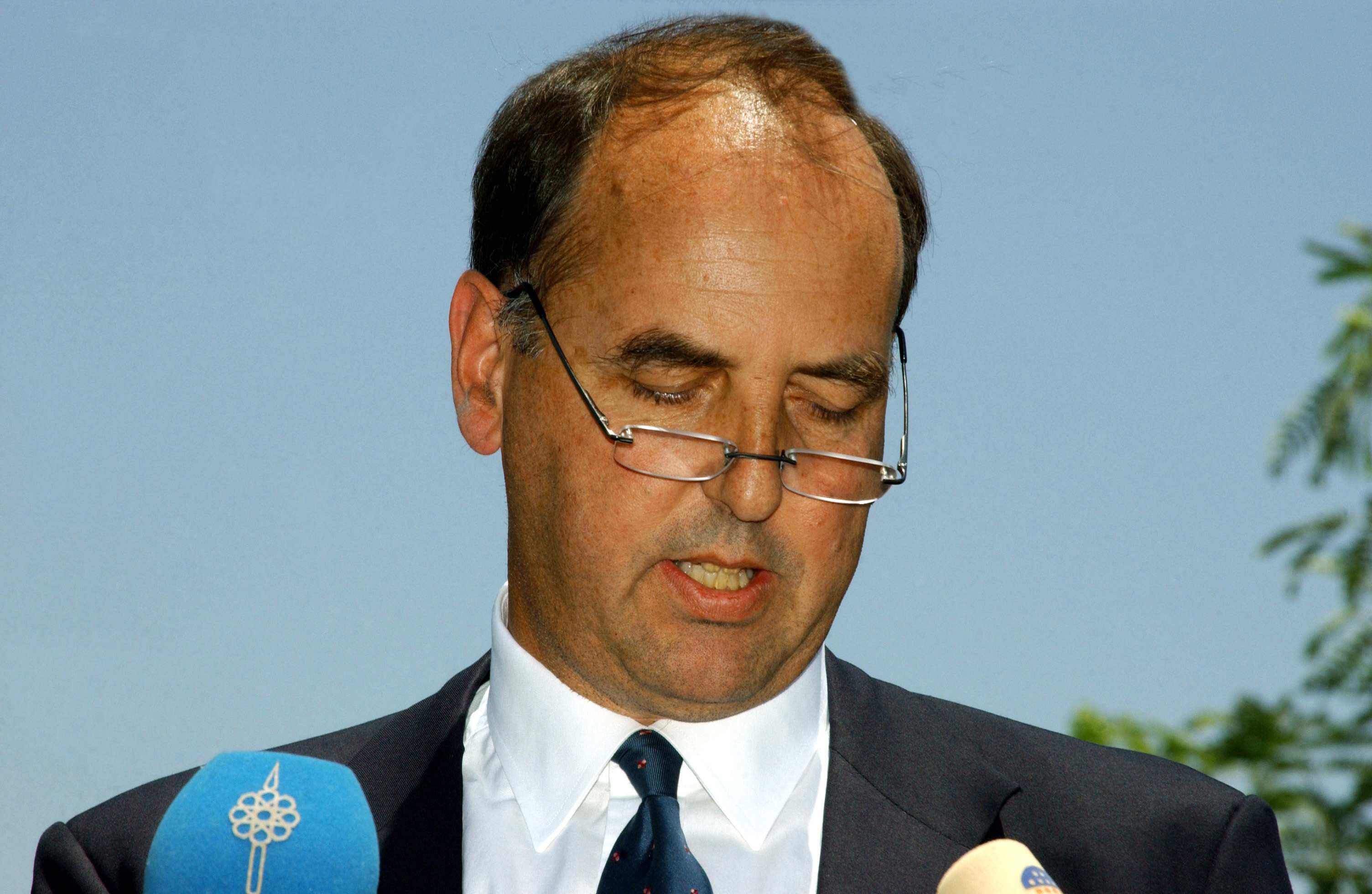
- Chaplin in Basra, Iraq in 2004

Her Majesty's Ambassador to Italy
- In office 2006–2011
- Preceded by: Sir Ivor Roberts
- Succeeded by: Christopher Prentice

Her Majesty's Ambassador to Iraq
- In office 2004–2005
- Preceded by: Break in diplomatic relations due to First Gulf War
- Succeeded by: Sir William Patey

Her Majesty's Ambassador to Jordan
- In office 2000–2002
- Preceded by: Christopher Battiscombe
- Succeeded by: Christopher Prentice

Personal details
- Born: 21 February 1951 (age 75)
- Spouse: Nicola Helen Fisher
- Children: 3 (1 son, 2 daughters)
- Education: Wellington College
- Alma mater: Queens' College, Cambridge
- Occupation: Diplomat

Edward Graham Mellish Chaplin (born 21 February 1951) is a British diplomat, notable for serving as British ambassador in occupied Iraq from April 2004. Until January 2011 he served as British ambassador to Italy. He was the former Prime Minister's Appointments Secretary.

== Education and personal life ==
Chaplin was educated at Wellington College, an independent school near the village of Crowthorne in Berkshire, followed by Queens' College, Cambridge, from which he graduated with a BA 1st Class Hons. Degree in Oriental Studies, in 1973.

Married Nicola Helen Fisher. One son, 2 daughters.

== Life and career ==
Chaplin headed the Middle East and North Africa department at the Foreign Office in the 80s, notably being briefly detained and assaulted by the Iranian Islamic Revolutionary Guard Corps in 1987.

Chaplin represented UK at the Nasiriyah conference, where he declared, in April 2003:

The military task is almost completed (...) Our vision for Iraq's future is simply to restore it to its natural place: united, at peace with itself and its neighbours, enjoying effective representative government, playing a leading role in the affairs of the Arab nation and the international community. (...) The Interim Iraqi Authority will put in place a consultative process to decide on the electoral process and the new political structures that best serve the interest of the Iraqi people

In April 2004, after the Invasion of Iraq, Chaplin was appointed ambassador to the Iraqi Governing Council in occupied Iraq.

Chaplin was one of the witnesses of The Iraq Inquiry.

=== Career highlights ===
- 1973 Entered FCO
- 1975–77 Muscat
- 1977–78 Brussels
- 1978–79 École Nationale d'Administration, Paris
- 1979–81 On secondment to CSD as Private Secretary to Lord President of the council, Leader of the House of Lords
- 1981–84 FCO
- 1985–87 Head of Chancery, Tehran
- 1987–89 FCO
- 1990–92 On secondment to Price Waterhouse Management Consultants, 1990–92
- 1992–96 Deputy Permanent Representative, UKMIS Geneva
- 1997–99 Head, Middle East Department, FCO
- 2000–02 Ambassador to the Hashemite Kingdom of Jordan
- 2002–04 Director, Middle East and N Africa, FCO
- 2004–05 Ambassador to Iraq
- 2005–06 Visiting Fellow, Centre of International Studies, University of Cambridge
- 2006–11 Ambassador to Italy

On 1 December 2009, Chaplin gave evidence to The Iraq Inquiry in which he spoke about post-war planning for Iraq.

== Sources and references ==
- Who's Who 2009

Diplomatic posts
Preceded by –	British Ambassador to Iraq; 2004–2005	Succeeded by Sir William Patey
Preceded by Christopher Battiscombe	British Ambassador to Jordan; 2000–2002	Succeeded by Christopher Prentice
Preceded by Sir Ivor Roberts	British Ambassador to Italy; 2006–2011	Succeeded by Christopher Prentice
