= Philip Hall (diplomat) =

British diplomat (born 1967)

His Excellency Philip Ridley Hall OBE
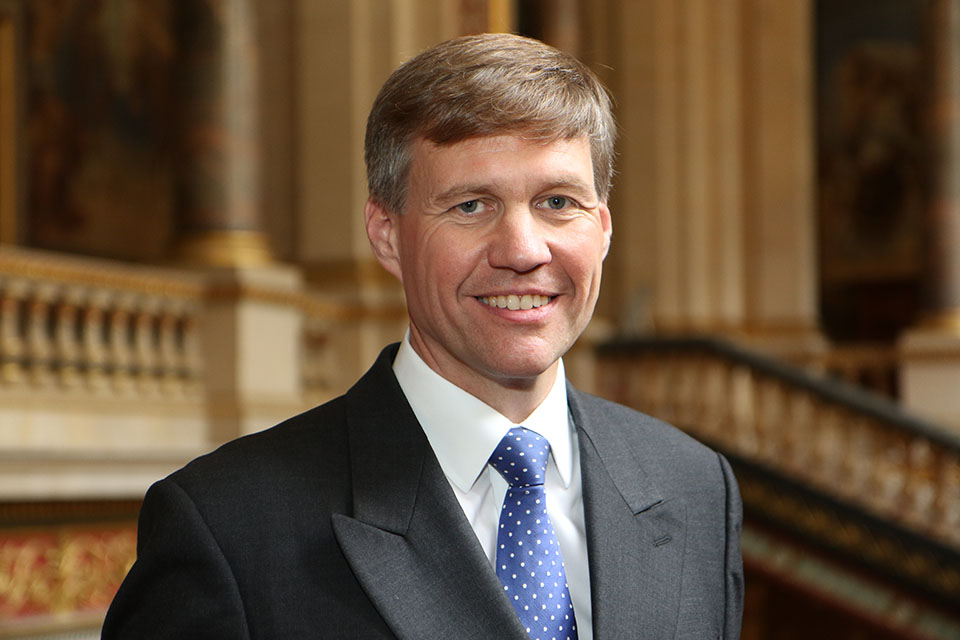

Ambassador of the United Kingdom to Jordan
- Incumbent
- Assumed office November 2023
- Monarch: Charles III
- Preceded by: Bridget Brind

British Consul-General to Jerusalem
- In office August 2017 – November 2021
- Monarch: Elizabeth II
- Preceded by: Alastair McPhail
- Succeeded by: Diane Corner

Personal details
- Born: 11 October 1967 (age 58) Chichester, West Sussex
- Education: Gonville and Caius College, Cambridge; Saarland University; London School of Economics

Philip Ridley Hall OBE (born 11 October 1967) is a British diplomat and solicitor, who is currently the Ambassador of the United Kingdom to Jordan.

== Early life ==
Philip Ridley Hall was born in Chichester, West Sussex on 11 October 1967. Hall was born to J. Ridley Hall and Janette Lavinia Hall.

Hall was educated at Cranleigh School, and attended Gonville and Caius College, Cambridge, graduating with a BA in Law in 1989. He completed a Postgraduate Certificate in European Integration (Law) at Saarland University, graduating in 1993. He later studied for an Executive Masters in Public Policy at the London School of Economics, graduating in 2017.

== Career ==
Between 1994 and 1997, Hall worked for HM Treasury. He joined the Foreign and Commonwealth Office in 1997; and headed the Middle East Peace Process Section from 1999 to 2001.

Hall served as the Deputy Head of the Africa Department (Equatorial) from 2001 to 2003. He was appointed an OBE in 2003.

Hall served as the Head of Division for the European Secretariat of the Cabinet Office from 2003 to 2006. He was the Deputy Head of Mission in Bucharest from 2007 to 2008, and served as the Defence Counsellor in the British Delegation to NATO from 2008 to 2012. He headed the Counter Proliferation Department from 2012 to 2015.

Hall led the Spending Review at the Foreign & Commonwealth Office from 2015 to 2016.

=== Consul-General to Jerusalem ===
On 17 October 2016, Hall was appointed as the British Consul-General to Jerusalem. Hall took up the appointment in August 2017, succeeding Alastair McPhail.

In February 2021, Hall condemned Israeli settlements in the West Bank as "illegal and an obstacle to restarting peace talks".

Hall has been on the Board of Trustees for St. John Eye Hospital Group since September 2017.

== Personal life ==
Hall married his wife, Karine Hall, in 2005. They have three children, one son and two daughters.
