= List of ambassadors of the United Kingdom to Bulgaria =

The ambassador of the United Kingdom to Bulgaria is the United Kingdom's foremost diplomatic representative in Bulgaria, and in charge of the UK's diplomatic mission in Sofia.

== List of heads of mission ==
=== Envoys extraordinary and ministers plenipotentiary ===
==== His Majesty the King of the Bulgarians ====
- 1903–1908: Sir George Buchanan
- 1909–1911: Mansfeldt Findlay
- 1911–1915: Sir Henry Bax-Ironside
- 1915–1920: No ambassador due to First World War Hugh O'Beirne CVO CB was Charge d'Affaires in this period
- 1920–1921: Sir Arthur Peel
- 1921–1928: Sir William Erskine
- 1928–1929: Rowland Sperling
- 1929–1933: Sydney Waterlow
- 1933–1936: Charles Bentinck
- 1936–1938: Maurice Peterson
- 1938–1941: George Rendel
- 1941–1946: No ambassador due to Second World War

==== Sofia ====
- 1947–1949: John Sterndale Bennett
- 1949–1951: Paul Mason
- 1951–1954: John Carvell
- 1954–1956: Geoffrey Furlonge
- 1956–1958: Richard Speaight
- 1958–1960: Anthony Lambert
- 1960–1963: Anthony Lincoln

=== Ambassadors extraordinary and plenipotentiary at Sofia ===
- 1964–1966: William Harpham
- 1966–1970: Desmond Crawley
- 1970–1973: Donald Logan
- 1973–1976: Edwin Bolland
- 1976–1980: John Cloake
- 1980–1983: Giles Bullard
- 1983–1986: John Snodgrass
- 1986–1989: John Fawcett
- 1989–1994: Richard Thomas
- 1994–1998: Roger Short
- 1998–2001: Richard Stagg
- 2001–2003: Ian Soutar
- 2004–2007: Jeremy Hill
- 2007–2011: Steve Williams
- 2011–2015: Jonathan Allen
- 2015–August 2020: Emma Hopkins
- August 2020–August 2024: Rob Dixon
- October 2024–present Nathaniel Copsey
