= List of ambassadors of the United Kingdom to South Sudan =

His Britannic Majesty's Ambassador to the Republic of South Sudan
- Flag of South Sudan
- Incumbent; David Ashley since 2025
- Style: His Excellency
- Appointer: King Charles III
- Website: British Embassy Juba

The ambassador of the United Kingdom to South Sudan is the United Kingdom's foremost diplomatic representative in the Republic of South Sudan.

South Sudan became an independent state on 9 July 2011 and the British Consulate General in the capital, Juba, was upgraded to a full embassy.

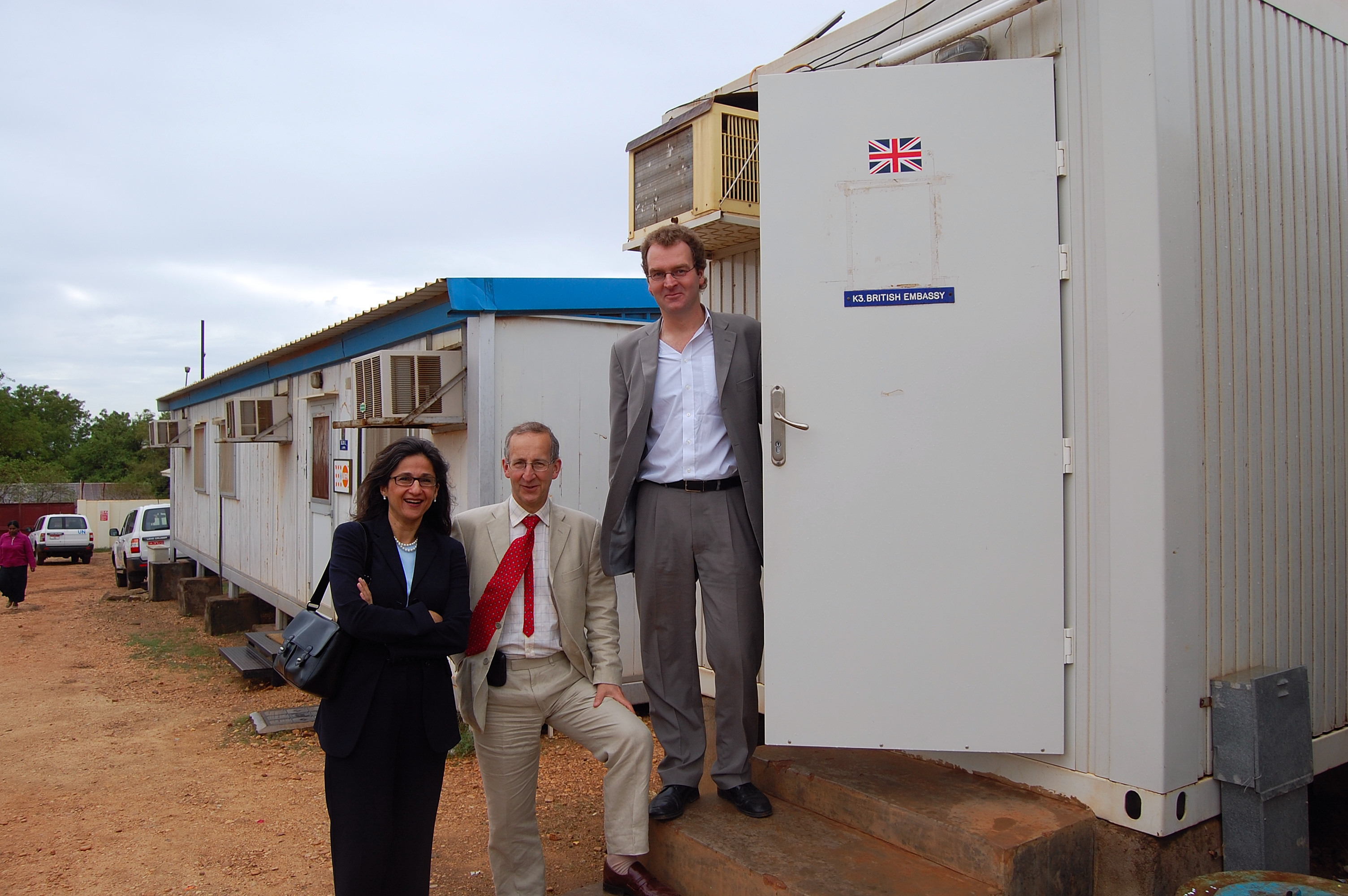
The portakabin-based British Consulate in Juba in 2008

== Ambassadors ==
- 2011–2013: Alastair McPhail
- 2013–2015: Ian Hughes
- 2015–2017: Timothy Morris
- 2017–2019: Alison Blackburne
- 2019–2020: Chris Trott
- 2021–2023: Johnny Baxter
- 2023–2025: Guy Warrington
- 2025–present: David Ashley
