= Alastair McPhail =

British diplomat

Alastair McPhail CMG OBE
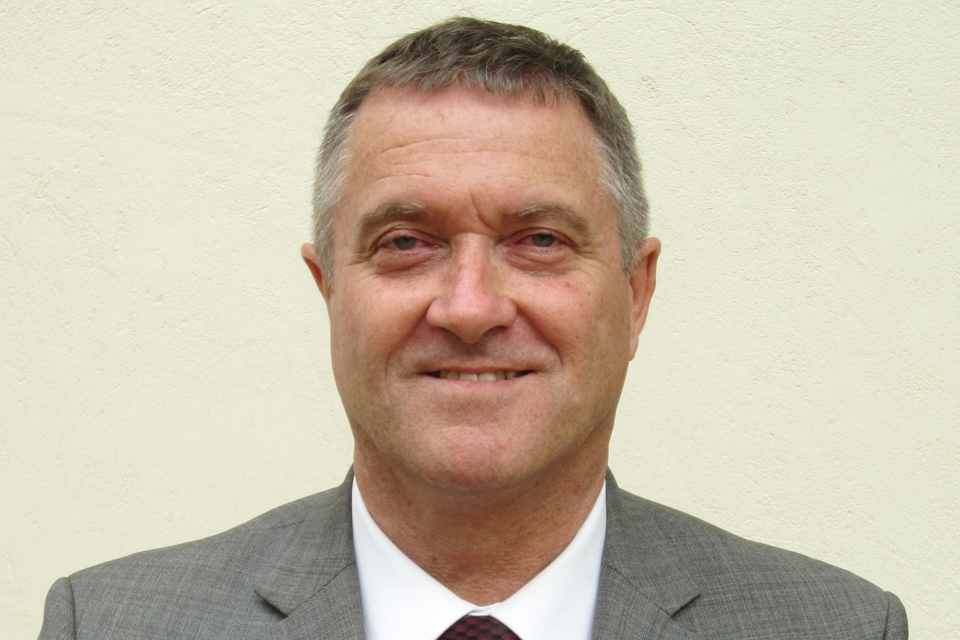

Permanent UK Representative to the African Union
- Incumbent
- Assumed office 28 January 2019

Permanent UK Representative to the UN Economic Commission for Africa
- Incumbent
- Assumed office 28 January 2019

British Ambassador to Ethiopia
- Incumbent
- Assumed office 28 January 2019
- Preceded by: Susanna Moorehead

British Ambassador to South Sudan
- In office July 2011 – 2013
- Succeeded by: Ian Hughes

Personal details
- Born: Alastair David McPhail; 2 March 1961 (age 65)

Alastair David McPhail CMG OBE (born 2 March 1961) is a British diplomat who was the United Kingdom's first Ambassador to the Republic of South Sudan, appointed in July 2011 when the country gained independence. He had served as consul-general from 16 March 2011. McPhail left South Sudan in March 2013 and was appointed to be British Consul-General in Jerusalem from January 2014. He was replaced in Jerusalem in 2017 and was appointed to be ambassador to the Federal Democratic Republic of Ethiopia from January 2019. He took up the post on 28 January 2019.

McPhail was appointed Officer of the Order of the British Empire (OBE) in the 2005 New Year Honours. He was appointed Companion of the Order of St Michael and St George (CMG) in the 2014 New Year Honours for services to British interests in South Sudan.

Diplomatic posts
New title	British Ambassador to South Sudan; 2011–2013	Succeeded by Ian Hughes
Preceded by Sir Vincent Fean	British Consul-General to Jerusalem; 2014–2017	Succeeded by Philip Hall
Preceded by Susanna Moorehead	British Ambassador to Ethiopia; 2019–present	Incumbent
