= John Addis =

John Addis may refer to:

- John Addis (diplomat) (1914–1983), British diplomat and ambassador
- John Patrick Addis (1950–2006), American law enforcement officer, parental child kidnapper, and suspected domestic abuser
