= Peter Millett (diplomat) =

British diplomat

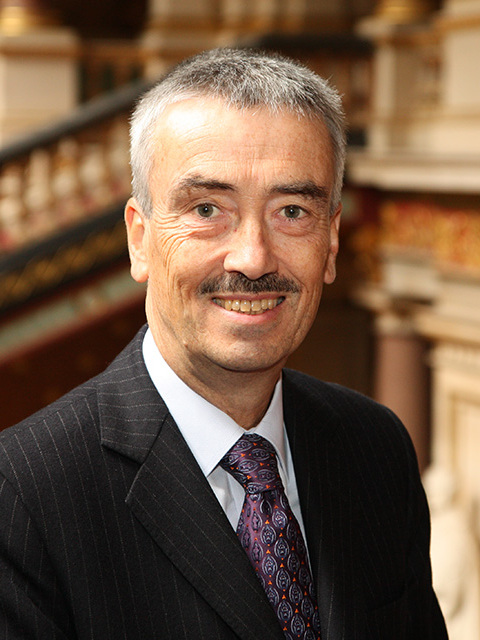
Peter Millett

Peter Joseph Millett CMG (born 23 January 1955) is a British diplomat who was ambassador to Libya 2015–2018.

== Early life ==
Peter Millett attended the independent school St. Joseph’s College in Ipswich.

== Career ==
Peter Millett joined the Foreign Office in 1974 and had early postings in Quito and Caracas. In 1980 he studied Arabic and then worked in Doha. On return to London he bridged to the Fast Stream and worked in the Private Office of the Foreign Office Minister in the House of Lords. He then worked at the UK Representation to the European Union specialising in energy and nuclear issues. Back in London, he worked on personnel policy followed by 4 years as Deputy Head of Mission in Athens. On return to London, he worked as Director for Security.

Millett then spent 12 years as a head of mission, as High Commissioner in Cyprus (2005-10), Ambassador in Jordan (2011-15) and Ambassador in Libya (2015-18). He was appointed CMG in 2013.

After retiring in 2018 Millett has worked as a consultant for British companies working in Libya and the Middle East. He is Chair of the Libya British Business Council, Chair of The Human Edge and a Trustee of Arts4Dementia, Global Partners Governance Foundation and Peaceful Change Initiative.

== Personal life ==
Millett married June Harnett in 1981. They have three daughters.

Diplomatic posts
Preceded by Lyn Parker	British High Commissioner to Cyprus; 2005–2010	Succeeded by Matthew Kidd
Preceded by James Watt	British Ambassadors to Jordan; 2011–2015	Succeeded by Edward Oakden
Preceded by Michael Aron	British Ambassador to Libya; 2015–2018	Succeeded by Frank Baker
