= Charles A. Joy =

American chemist (1823–1891)

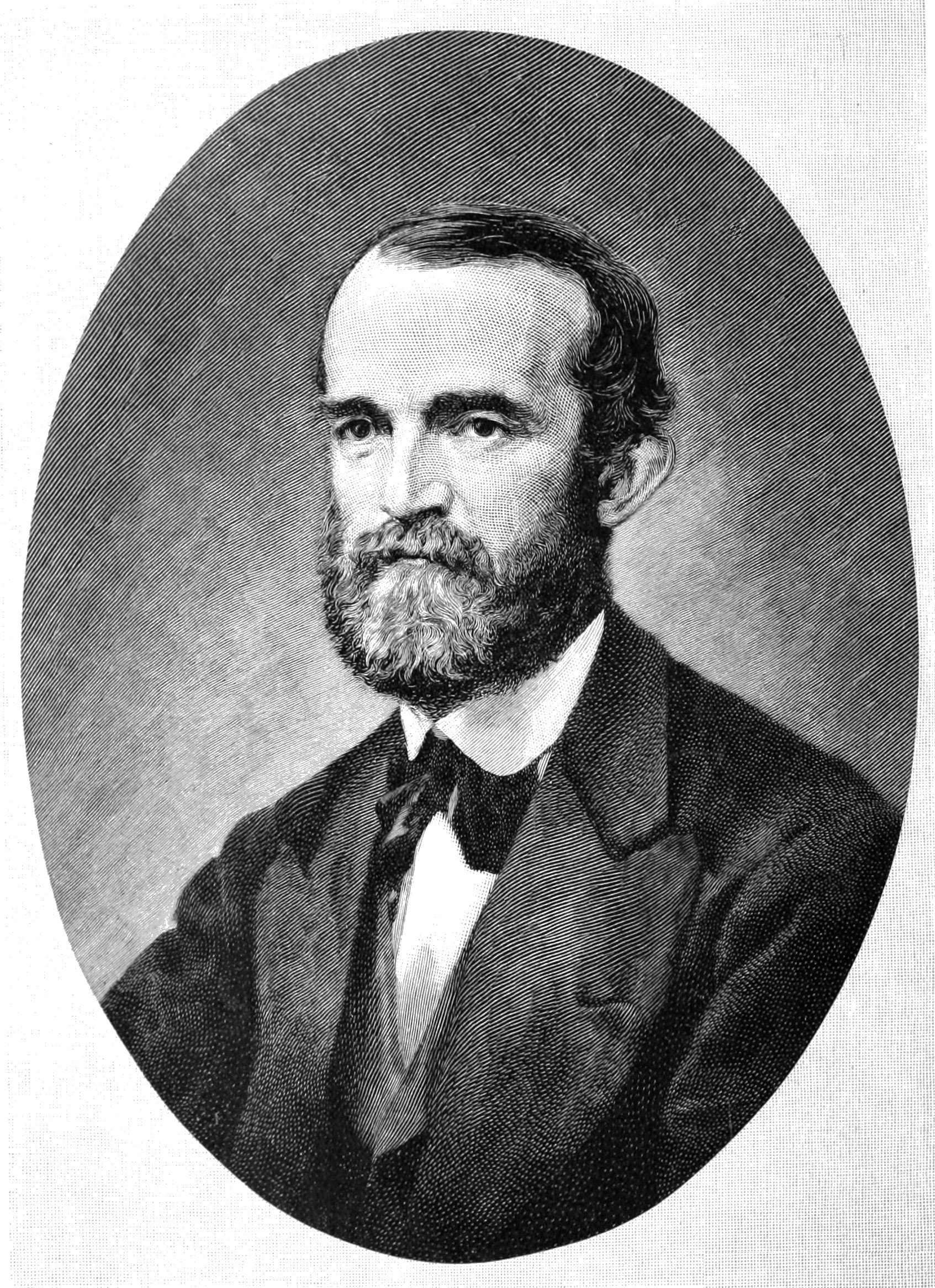

Charles Arad Joy (8 October 1823 – 29 May 1891) was an American chemist.

== Biography ==
He was born in Ludlowville, New York. He graduated from Harvard Law School in 1847. During the same year, he was appointed on the U.S. Geological Survey of the Lake Superior region, under Josiah D. Whitney and Charles T. Jackson. Subsequently, he went to Europe and studied chemistry at Berlin, at Göttingen, where in 1852 he received the degree of doctor of philosophy, and at the Sorbonne in Paris.

After his return to the United States, he was soon called to the chair of chemistry in Union College, and held it until 1857, when he was elected to a similar professorship at Columbia University, remaining there until 1877. Failing health, the result of a sunstroke that he received at the World's fair in Philadelphia during 1876, compelled his retirement, and for several years he resided in Germany.

Joy was a member of the juries of the international world's fairs of London, Paris, Vienna, and Philadelphia, and also a member of scientific societies. In 1866 he was elected president of the Lyceum of Natural History (now New York Academy of Sciences). He was also president of the American Photographic Society, chairman of the Polytechnic Association of the American Institute, and foreign secretary of the American Geographical Society.

== Personal life ==
Joy and his wife Laura (née Rupe) had two daughters, one of their daughters, Eleanor Joy (1868-1936) was the mother of Douglas Busk.

He died in Stockbridge, Massachusetts, on 29 May 1891.

== Research and publications ==
His original research began in Göttingen with investigations on the combination of alcohol radicles with selenium, in which field he was one of the earliest workers. Later he examined the compounds of glucinum, and published an account of his investigations in the American Journal of Science. He also made numerous analyses of minerals and meteorites. Of the former, many were contributed to Dana's Mineralogy.

Joy was a frequent contributor of popular articles on scientific subjects to various journals, and had held the editorship of Scientific American, and later of the Journal of Applied Chemistry. He also wrote chemical articles for the American Cyclopædia.
