= Paul Gore-Booth, Baron Gore-Booth =

British diplomat (1909–1984)

The Right Honourable The Lord Gore-Booth GCMG KCVO
- Gore-Booth in 1968.

Member of the House of Lords
- In office 2 July 1969 – 29 June 1984

Permanent Under-Secretary for Foreign Affairs Head of HM Diplomatic Service
- In office 1965–1969
- Prime Minister: Harold Wilson
- Foreign Secretary: Michael Stewart; George Brown
- Preceded by: Sir Harold Caccia
- Succeeded by: Sir Denis Greenhill

High Commissioner of the United Kingdom to India
- In office 1960–1965
- Preceded by: Malcolm MacDonald
- Succeeded by: John Freeman

United Kingdom Ambassador to Burma
- In office 1953–1956
- Preceded by: Richard Speaight
- Succeeded by: Sir Richard Allen

Personal details
- Born: 3 February 1909 Doncaster
- Died: 29 June 1984 (aged 75)
- Spouse: Patricia Mary Ellerton (m. 1940)
- Children: 4, including David
- Education: Eton College, Balliol College
- Occupation: Diplomat, politician

Paul Henry Gore-Booth, Baron Gore-Booth GCMG KCVO (3 February 1909 – 29 June 1984) was a British diplomat.

He was British High Commissioner to India, 1960 to 1965, then Permanent Under-Secretary of State for Foreign Affairs and Head of HM Diplomatic Service, retiring in 1969, after which was created a life peer and went into business. He was a member of the House of Lords from 1969 until his death.

== Early life ==
Gore-Booth was educated at Eton College and Balliol College, Oxford. His aunt was the Irish republican and socialist revolutionary, Countess Markievicz (née Gore-Booth).

== Career ==
Gore-Booth joined the British Foreign Service in 1933, serving in the Foreign Office in London from 1933 to 1936, and then was stationed in Vienna, 1936–37, Tokyo, 1938–42, and Washington, 1942–45, where he attended the Hot Springs Food Conference in 1943. He returned to the Foreign Office in London, 1945–49, attending the UNRRA Conference, 1943, the Chicago Civil Aviation Conference, 1944, the San Francisco Conference, 1945, and the UN Assembly, January and October 1946 (as Secretary of the UK Delegation), and in 1947 as the British Representative, Group of Four Drafting Convention setting up the Organisation for Economic Co-operation and Development. He served as Head of the UN Economic and Social and Refugees Departments, 1947–48; Head of European Recovery Department, Foreign Office, 1948–49; Director of British Information Services in United States, 1949–53; Ambassador to Burma, 1953–56; Deputy Under-Secretary (Economic Affairs), Foreign Office, 1956–60; British High Commissioner to India, 1960–65; Permanent Under-Secretary of State for Foreign Affairs, 1965–69; and Head of HM Diplomatic Service, 1968–69.

After retirement from the civil service Gore-Booth was a director of Grindlays Bank and the United Kingdom Provident Institution, 1969–1979. He also served as Registrar of the Order of St Michael and St George, from 1966 to 1979, as president of the Sherlock Holmes Society of London, 1967–1979; chairman, Save the Children Fund, 1970–1976; chairman, Windsor Music Festival, 1971–1973; member, Disasters Emergency Committee, 1974–77; chairman, board of governors, School of Oriental and African Studies, University of London, 1975–1980.

== Personal life ==
After Oxford, in 1940 Gore-Booth married Patricia Mary Ellerton, by whom he had twin sons and two daughters. One of his sons was Sir David Gore-Booth.

== Honours and arms ==
Coat of arms of Paul Gore-Booth, Baron Gore-Booth
Crest 1st a lion passant (Booth); 2nd a wolf rampant (Gore). Escutcheon Quarterly of six: 1st grandquarterly 1st & 4th Argent three boars' heads couped and erect Sable 2nd & 3rd Gules a fess between three cross-crosslets Or; 2nd Argent on a fess Sable three bezants; 3rd Argent a lion's head erased between three crescents Gules; 4th Gules three cinquefoils Argent; 5th Gules on a bend Or three martlets; 6th chequy Azure and Argent a fess Gules. Motto Booth: Quod Erad Spero (I Hope For What I Shall Be); Gore: In Hoc Signo Vinces (Under This Sign Thou Shalt Conquer)

- Order of St Michael and St George
  - Companion (1949), Knight Commander (1957), Knight Grand Cross (1965)
- Royal Victorian Order
  - Knight Commander (1961)
- Life Peer as Baron Gore-Booth, of Maltby in the West Riding of the County of York (cr. 2 July 1969).

== Works ==
- With Great Truth and Respect (autobiog.) 1974
- Satow's Guide to Diplomatic Practice, 5th edn, 1978.

== See also ==
- Gore baronets
- Booth baronets

Diplomatic posts
Preceded by Malcolm MacDonald	High Commissioner to India; 1960–1965	Succeeded by John Freeman
