= Bridget Brind =

United Kingdom diplomat and ambassador to Jordan

Bridget Brind OBE

British Ambassador to Jordan
- In office April 2020 – November 2023
- Monarchs: Elizabeth II; Charles III
- Prime Minister: Boris Johnson; Liz Truss; Rishi Sunak
- Preceded by: Edward Oakden
- Succeeded by: Philip Hall

Bridget Brind OBE is a British civil servant and diplomat, who served as Ambassador of the United Kingdom to Jordan from 2020-2023.

== Career ==
Brind joined the Foreign and Commonwealth Office (FCO) in 1995.

Brind worked in the Department for Exiting the European Union.

Brind became the first female UK ambassador to Jordan in 2020. She left the post in 2023.

== Personal life ==
Brind is married. She has one child, a daughter.
