= Levant Consular Service =

British diplomatic organisation

The Levant Consular Service or Consular Service for the Ottoman Dominions, Persia, Greece, and Morocco was a specialised British diplomatic organisation centered in the Levant. From 1877 to 1916, it trained 88 Britons in consular service. The diplomatic arm spanned from the Balkans to China, mainly centring on the Ottoman Empire.

== Origins ==
During the 19th century the British foreign service consisted of the Victorian Consular Service, which was further divided into a General Service, a Far Eastern Service, and the Levant Service. Direct British diplomacy in the Levant dated back to 1825, when the Levant Company ceased operations. The British Diplomatic Service traditionally selected consuls for the Levant from expatriate British citizens living in the region (particularly those in Constantinople). The 1858 Select Committee on Foreign Office recommended reforming diplomacy in the Levant so that only Britons would serve as consuls. In order to find qualified individuals, they urged the creation of a programme that would examine British subjects, specifically their aptitude for language, train them in Constantinople, and eventually use them as interpreters. Concerns over expenses of the programme and whether it could attract qualified applicants delayed establishment until urging by Lord Salisbury led Philip Currie, 1st Baron Currie, to create it. The specialised Levant Consular Service was created in 1877.

== Training programme ==
The Levant Consular Service consisted entirely of natural-born British citizens who were placed into the service based upon an exam intended to measure their knowledge of and aptitude for learning foreign languages. Once accepted into the service, the person, generally unmarried and 18 to 24 years old, would travel to Ortakeui (3 miles (4.8 km) away from the British Embassy in Constantinople) and be educated for two years (mainly in oriental languages). The students would then have to take an exam and, upon passing, were made assistant consuls and entered into the British diplomatic service. Graduates of the programme could advance in the Diplomatic Service in Persia, Morocco, Greece, and the Ottoman Empire. Prospective members were examined in at least six languages, and committed to not leaving the service for five years after receiving an appointment.

The first exams were held over August and September 1877 and an initial class of six students entered the programme. Although in 1890 it was reported by a British commission that the service had "produced good results" and 26 Britons had joined the service, the school was soon closed because it was very expensive. In 1894, the programme was restarted, but education in Ortakeui was replaced with two years of study at British universities, notably Cambridge, where E. G. Browne trained many students. It was written that the service produced consuls "as fully trained as any British public servant overseas". The training programme ended in 1916, having recruited 88 consular officers. The Levant Consular programme ended in 1936.

== Diplomatic arm ==
The diplomatic arm of the service spanned from the Balkans to China, mainly centring on the Ottoman Empire. One of the service's main aims was to connect commercial agents with the consul. After the Russo-Turkish War, the position of 'military consul' was created and the consuls played a major role as mediators and peacekeepers.

== Bibliography ==
- Berridge, Geoff (2009). British diplomacy in Turkey, 1583 to the present : a study in the evolution of the resident embassy. Leiden: Martinus Nijhoff Publishers. ISBN 978-90-474-2983-8. OCLC 593351831.
- Kirk-Greene, A. (24 February 2000). Britain's Imperial Administrators, 1858-1966. Springer. ISBN 978-0-230-28632-0.
- McCarthy, Carmel; Healey, John F. (11 March 2004). Biblical & Near Eastern Essays. A&C Black. ISBN 978-0-8264-4663-3.
- Berridge, G. (8 February 2011). The Counter-Revolution in Diplomacy and Other Essays. Springer. ISBN 978-0-230-30902-9.
- “The Selection, Instruction and Examination of the Student Interpreters of the Levant Consular Service 1877–1916.”
- Fry, Geoffrey K. (22 August 2019). Growth of Government. Routledge. ISBN 978-1-135-16737-0.
- Nish, Ian (18 October 2013). Britain and Japan Vol II: Biographical Portraits. Routledge. ISBN 978-1-134-24670-0.
- Tusan, Michelle Elizabeth (2012). Smyrna's Ashes: Humanitarianism, Genocide, and the Birth of the Middle East. Global, Area, and International Archive, University of California Press. ISBN 978-1-938169-05-2.
