= Robert George Howe =

British diplomat (1893–1981)

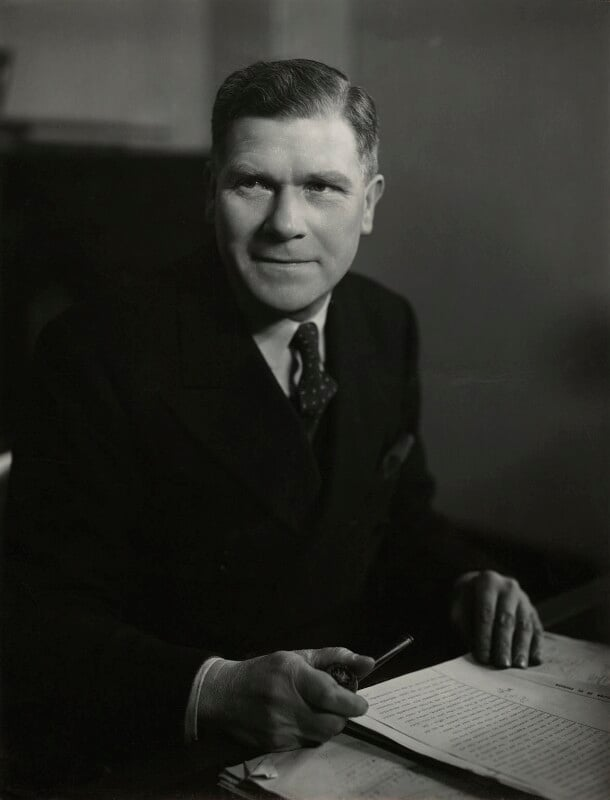
Howe in 1947

Sir Robert George Howe GBE KCMG (born Derby, England, 19 September 1893, died 22 June 1981) was a British diplomat who served as Governor-General of the Sudan from 1947 to 1954.

== Education ==
Howe was educated at Derby School and St Catharine's College, Cambridge.

== Career ==
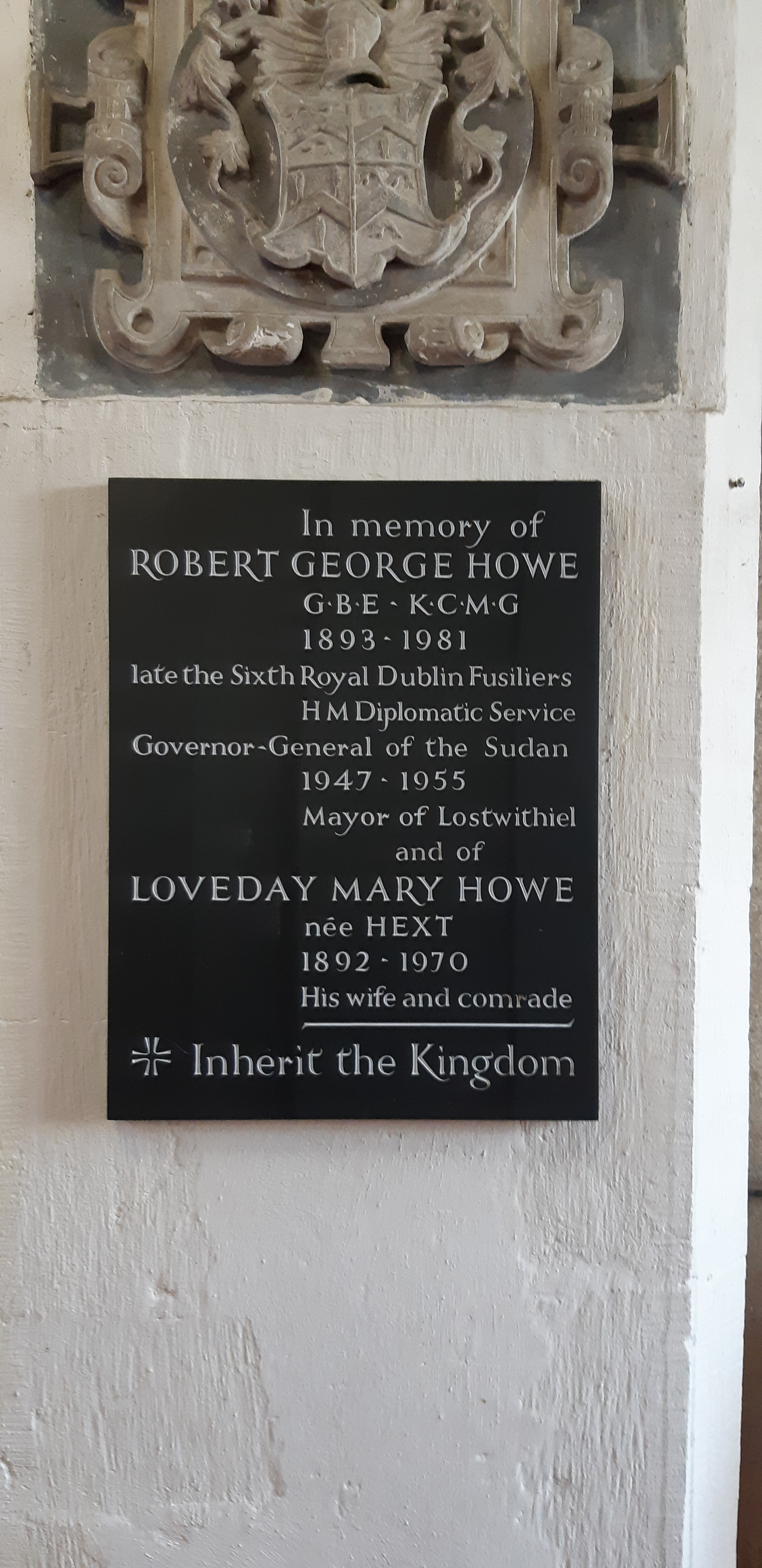
Robert Howe plaque

- Sixth Royal Dublin Fusiliers
- Third Secretary at British Embassy, Copenhagen, 1920
- Second Secretary, Copenhagen, 1920–1922
- Second Secretary, Belgrade, 1922–1924
- Second Secretary, Rio de Janeiro, 1924–1926
- First Secretary, Rio de Janeiro, 1926
- First Secretary, Bucharest, 1926–1929
- Foreign Office, 1930–1934
- Acting Counsellor at Peking, 1934–1936
- Counsellor, Peking, 1936
- British Minister in Riga, 1940–1942
- British Minister in Abyssinia, 1942–45
- Assistant Under-Secretary of State, Foreign Office, 1945
- Governor-General of the Sudan, 1947–1955
- retired from Diplomatic Service, 1955
- Justice of the Peace, Cornwall, 1955–1968
- Mayor of Lostwithiel, Cornwall

== Family ==
In 1919, Howe married Loveday Mary Hext (1892-1970), and they had one son.

== Honours ==
- Companion of the Order of St Michael and St George, 1937
- Knight Commander of the Order of St Michael and St George, 1947
- Knight Grand Cross of the Order of the British Empire, 1949
