= Gordon Whitteridge =

British diplomat (1908–1995)

Sir Gordon (Coligny) Whitteridge KCMG OBE (6 November 1908 – 11 January 1995) was a British diplomat. He was appointed the British consul to Sumatra from late 1941 to February 1942. He was Ambassador to Burma from 1962 to 1965, and Ambassador to Afghanistan from 1965 to 1968.
