= Katrina Williams =

Katrina Williams may refer to:

- Kat Williams (born 1964), American blues singer
- Katrina Williams (civil servant), British civil servant
- Katrina C. Willis (born 1971), singer/songwriter, musician and producer
