= Bailout =

Financial help to a corporation or country to avoid bankruptcy

A bailout is the provision of financial help to a corporation or country which otherwise would undergo bankruptcy. A bailout differs from the term bail-in (coined in 2010) under which the bondholders or depositors of global systemically important financial institutions (G-SIFIs) are forced to participate in the recapitalization process but taxpayers are not. Some governments also have the power to participate in the insolvency process; for instance, the U.S. government intervened in the General Motors bailout of 2009–2013. A bailout can, but does not necessarily, avoid an insolvency process. The term bailout is maritime in origin and describes the act of removing water from a sinking vessel using a bucket.

== Overview ==
A bailout could be done for profit motives, such as when a new investor resurrects a floundering company by buying its shares at firesale prices, or for social objectives, such as when, hypothetically speaking, a wealthy philanthropist reinvents an unprofitable fast food company into a non-profit food distribution network. However, the common use of the phrase occurs where government resources are used to support a failing company typically to prevent a greater problem or financial contagion to other parts of the economy. For example, the US government assumes transportation to be critical to the country's general economic prosperity. As such, it has sometimes been the policy of the US government to protect major US companies responsible for transportation (aircraft manufacturers, train companies, automobile companies, etc.) from failure by subsidies and low-interest loans. Such companies, among others, are deemed "too big to fail" because their goods and services are considered by the government to be constant universal necessities in maintaining the nation's welfare and often, indirectly, its security.

Emergency-type government bailouts can be controversial. Debates raged in 2008 over if and how to bail out the failing auto industry in the United States. Those against it, like pro-free market radio personality Hugh Hewitt, saw the bailout as unacceptable. He argued that the companies should be dismantled organically by the free-market forces so that entrepreneurs may arise from the ashes; that the bailout signals lower business standards for giant companies by incentivizing risk, creating moral hazard through the assurance of safety nets that ought not be but unfortunately are considered in business equations; and that a bailout promotes centralized bureaucracy by allowing government powers to choose the terms of the bailout. Furthermore, government bailouts are criticized as corporate welfare, which encourages corporate irresponsibility.

Others, such as economist Jeffrey Sachs, have characterized the particular bailout as a necessary evil and have argued in 2008 that the probable incompetence in management of the car companies is an insufficient reason to let them fail completely and to risk disturbing the delicate economic state of the United States, as up to three million jobs rested on the solvency of the Big Three and things were bleak enough as they were.

Randall D. Guynn noted similar arguments for the financial bailouts of 2008, explaining that most policymakers considered bailouts to be the lesser of two evils, given the lack of effective resolution options at the time.

In the 2008 financial crisis, large amounts of government support were used to protect the financial system, and many of those actions were attacked as bailouts. Over $1 trillion of government support was deployed in this period and "voters were furious." The US Troubled Asset Relief Program authorized up to $700bn of government support of which $426bn was invested in banks, American International Group, automakers, and other assets. TARP recovered funds totalling $441.7 billion from $426.4 billion invested, earning a $15.3 billion profit.

In the United Kingdom, the bank rescue package was even larger, totaling some £500bn.

Controversial bailouts occurred in other countries as well, such as Germany (the SoFFin rescue fund), Switzerland (the rescue of UBS), Ireland (the "blanket guarantee" of Irish domestic banks issued in September 2008), and several other countries in Europe.

== Bailout vs. bail-in ==
A bail-in is the opposite of a bail-out because it does not rely on external parties, especially government capital support. A bail-in creates new capital to rescue a failing firm through an internal recapitalization and forces the borrower's creditors to bear the burden by having part of the debt they are owed written off or converted into equity. (For example, in the case of the Cyprus banks in 2013, the creditors in question were bondholders, and the bail-in was of depositors with more than €100,000 in their accounts.)

=== Theory ===
The bail-in was first proposed publicly in an Economist Op-Ed "From Bail-out to Bail-in" in January 2010, by Paul Calello and Wilson Ervin. It was described as a new alternative between "taxpayer bail-outs (bad) and systemic financial collapse (probably worse)." It envisioned a high-speed recapitalization financed by "bailing-in" (converting) bondholder debt into fresh equity. The new capital would absorb losses and provide new capital to support critical activities, thereby avoiding a sudden disorderly collapse or fire sale, as seen in the Lehman failure. Management would be fired and shareholders would be displaced by the bailed-in bondholders, but the franchise, employees and core services could continue, supported by the newly converted capital.

Around the same time, the Bank of England was developing similar architecture, given the pressing need for a better tool to handle failing banks during the 2008 financial crisis. The first official discussion of bail-in was set out in a speech by Paul Tucker, who chaired the Financial Stability Board (FSB) Working Group on Cross Border Crisis Management and was also deputy governor for Financial Stability at the Bank of England. In March 2010, Tucker began to outline the properties of a new "bail-in" strategy to handle the failure of a large bank:

A quite different, and rather more profound approach would be to deploy a super special resolution framework that permitted the authorities, on a rapid timetable, to haircut uninsured creditors in a going concern.

By October 2011, the FSB Working Group had developed this thinking considerably and published the "Key Attributes of Effective Resolution Regimes for Financial Institutions." The document set out core principles to be adopted by all participating jurisdictions, including the legal and operational capability for such a super special resolution regime (now known as "bail-in").

The scope of the planned resolution regime was not limited to large domestic banks. In addition to "systemically significant or critical" financial institutions, the scope also applies to two further categories of institutions Global SIFIs (banks incorporated domestically in a country that is implementing the bail-in regime) and "Financial Market Infrastructures (FMIs)" like clearing houses. The inclusion of FMIs in potential bail-ins is in itself a major departure. The FSB defines those market infrastructures to include multilateral securities and derivatives clearing and settlement systems and a whole host of exchange and transaction systems, such as payment systems, central securities depositories, and trade depositories. That would mean that an unsecured creditor claim to, for example, a clearing house institution or a stock exchange could in theory be affected if such an institution needed to be bailed in.

The cross-border elements of the resolution of globally significant banking institutions (G-SIFIs) were a topic of a joint paper by the Federal Reserve and the Bank of England in 2012.

Outgoing Deputy Director of the Bank of England Paul Tucker chose to open his academic career at Harvard with an October 2013 address in Washington to the Institute of International Finance in which he argued that resolution had advanced enough in several countries that bailouts would not be required and so would be bailed-in, notably the US G-SIBs. Although they were still large, they were no longer too big to fail because of the improvements in resolution technology.

In a similar vein, a GAO report in 2014 determined that the market expectation of bailouts for the largest "too big to fail" banks had been largely eliminated by the reforms. That was determined by various methods, especially by comparing the funding cost of the biggest banks with smaller banks that are subject to ordinary FDIC resolution. That differential, which had been large in the crisis, had been reduced to roughly zero by the advance of reform, but the GAO also cautioned that the results should be interpreted with caution.

In Europe, the EU financial community symposium on the "Future of Banking in Europe" (December 2013) was attended by Irish Finance Minister Michael Noonan, who proposed a bail-in scheme in light of the banking union that was under discussion at the event. Deputy BoE Director Jon Cunliffe suggested in a March 2014 speech at Chatham House that the domestic banks were too big to fail, but instead of the nationalisation process used in the case of HBOS, RBS and threatened for Barclays (all in late 2008), those banks could henceforth be bailed in.

A form of bail-in was used in small Danish institutions (such as Amagerbanken) as early as 2011, as well as the later conversion of junior debt at the Dutch Bank SNS REALL. However, the process did not receive extensive global attention until the bail-in of the main banks of Cyprus during 2013, discussed below. The restructuring of the Co-op bank in the UK (2013) has been described as a voluntary or negotiated bail-in.

=== Legislative and executive efforts ===
The Dodd–Frank Act legislates bank resolution procedures for the United States under Title I and Title II. Title I refers to the preferred route, which is to resolve a bank under bankruptcy procedures aided by extensive pre-planning (a "living will").

Title II establishes additional powers that can be used if bankruptcy is seen to pose "serious and adverse effects on financial stability in the United States", as determined by the Secretary of the Treasury, together with two thirds Federal Reserve Board and two thirds of the Federal Deposit Insurance Corporation board. Like Title I, it would force shareholders and creditors to bear the losses of the failed financial company, "removing management that was responsible for the financial condition of the company." The procedures also establish certain protections for creditors, such as by setting a requirement for the payout to claimants to ve at least as much as the claimants would have received under a bankruptcy liquidation.

The FDIC has drawn attention to the problem of post-resolution governance and suggested that a new CEO and Board of Directors should be installed under FDIC receivership guidance.

Claims are paid in the following order, and any deficit to the government must be recouped by assessments on the financial industry:

1. Administrative costs
2. The government
3. Wages, salaries, or commissions of employees
4. Contributions to employee benefit plans
5. Any other general or senior liability of the company
6. Any junior obligation
7. Salaries of executives and directors of the company
8. Obligations to shareholders, members, general partners, and other equity holders

A number of strategies were explored early on to determine how Title I and Title II powers could be best used to resolve a large failing bank, including "Purchase and Assumption" and "Loss Sharing". Over time, the preferred approach evolved to a bail-in strategy, which is more direct, as it does not require an acquisition party. That approach was developed under the FDIC Office of Complex Financial Institutions group led by James R. Wigand. The approach is described in a slide deck from January 2012 as well as in Congressional testimony.

The specific strategy for implementing a bail-in under the Dodd–Frank Act requirements has been described as the "Single Point of Entry mechanism". The innovative FDIC strategy was described by Federal Reserve Governor Jerome Powell as a "classic simplifier, making theoretically possible something that seemed impossibly complex." It created a relatively simple path by which bail-in could be implemented under the existing Dodd–Frank powers. Powell explained:

Under single point of entry, the FDIC will be appointed receiver of only the top-tier parent holding company of the failed financial group. Promptly after the parent holding company is placed into receivership, the FDIC will transfer the assets of the parent company (primarily its investments in subsidiaries) to a bridge holding company. Equity claims of the failed parent company's shareholders will be wiped out, and claims of its unsecured debt holders will be written down as necessary to reflect any losses in the receivership that the shareholders cannot cover. To capitalize the bridge holding company and the operating subsidiaries, and to permit transfer of ownership and control of the bridge company back to private hands, the FDIC will exchange the remaining claims of unsecured creditors of the parent for equity and/or debt claims of the bridge company. If necessary, the FDIC would provide temporary liquidity to the bridge company until the 'bail-in' of the failed parent company's creditors can be accomplished.

A comprehensive overview of this strategy is available in the Bipartisan Policy Center report "Too Big to Fail: The Path to a Solution".

The Canadian government clarified its rules for bail-ins in the "Economic Action Plan 2013", at pages 144–145 "to reduce the risk for taxpayers."

The Eurogroup proposed on 27 June 2013 that after 2018, bank shareholders would be first in line to assume the losses of a failed bank before bondholders and certain large depositors. Insured deposits under £85,000 (€100,000) would be exempt and, with specific exemptions, uninsured deposits of individuals and small companies would be given preferred status in the bail-in pecking order for taking losses. That agreement formalised the practice seen earlier in Cyprus. Under the proposal, all unsecured bondholders would be hit for losses before a bank was allowed to receive capital injections directly from the European Stability Mechanism. A tool known as the Single Resolution Mechanism, which was agreed by Eurogroup members on 20 March 2014, was part of an EU effort to prevent future financial crises by pooling responsibility for eurozone banks, known as a banking union. In a first step, the European Central Bank will fully assume supervision of the 18-nation currency bloc's lenders in November 2014. The deal needed formal approval by the European Parliament and by national governments. The resolution fund would be paid for by the banks themselves and will gradually merge national resolution funds into a common European one until it hits the €55 billion target of funding. See the EC FAQ on the SRM. The legislative item was split into three initiatives by Internal Market and Services Commissioner Michel Barnier: Bank Recovery and Resolution Directive, DGS and SRM.

=== Practice ===
A form of bail-in was used in small Danish institutions (such as Amagerbanken) as early as 2011. The Dutch authorities converted the junior debt of SNS REAAL in 2013, as part of a privately funded recapitalization.

During the 2012–2013 Cypriot financial crisis, the Cypriot economy came to near-collapse as the Greek government-debt crisis (to which Cypriot banks were heavily exposed) threatened Cyprus's banks, causing a financial panic, bank runs, and a downgrade of government bonds to "junk" status. In March 2013, a €10 billion bailout was announced by the European troika, a loose coalition of the European Union, the European Central Bank and the International Monetary Fund, in return for Cyprus agreeing to close its second largest bank, the Cyprus Popular Bank, also known as Laiki Bank. The Cypriots had to agree to levy all uninsured deposits there and possibly around 40% of uninsured deposits in the Bank of Cyprus, the island's largest commercial bank. After an initial proposal was replaced with the final proposal, no insured deposit of €100,000 or less was to be affected. The levy of deposits that exceeded €100,000 was termed a "bail-in" to differentiate it from a government-backed bailout. The Bank of Cyprus executed the bail-in on 28 April 2013.

There were some controversial elements, especially with respect to the initial plan, which included a contribution from insured depositors, which was described as "not smart" by ECB President Mario Draghi. The proposal was amended the following day to affect only uninsured depositors and creditors. In a broader review of the events of Cyprus, Draghi addressed some of the criticism of this event in a press conference:

A bail-in in itself is not a problem: it is the lack of ex ante rules known to all parties and the lack of capital buffers or other "bail-inable" assets that may make a bail-in a disorderly event. The existence of buffers of "bail-inable" assets is therefore essential. In the case of Cyprus, one peculiarity was the fact that these assets were actually quite limited by comparison with the size of the banks'/assets. Furthermore, the absence of ex ante rules gives the impression of an ad hoc approach in such situations.

In 2016, Cyprus completed its bailout program, which was successfully implemented. About 30 percent of the country's overall bailout funds were never tapped.

In recent years, considerable effort has been made to ensure that a large supply of bail-inable liabilities is in place for the largest banks. The rules for "Total Loss Absorption Capacity" (TLAC) in the US have led the eight US G-SIFIs to issue approximately $1.0 trillion of long-term holding company liabilities, which could be used for this purpose. Combined with equity and other capital securities, that establishes an aggregate TLAC of roughly $2 trillion for the eight U.S. G-SIFIs. In the UK, the Bank of England has set out the TLAC requirements for its largest banks, described as MREL, at between 25.2% and 29.3% of risk-weighted assets. Switzerland has imposed requirements on its two G-SIFIs of 28.6% of risk-weighted assets.

The EU is currently debating how best to implement the FSB requirements across its banking system and what the appropriate size of that requirement should be.

== Themes ==
From the many bailouts over the course of the 20th century, certain principles and lessons have emerged that are consistent:

- Central banks should provide loans to help the system cope with liquidity concerns if banks are unable or unwilling to provide loans to businesses or individuals. Lending into illiquidity but not insolvency was articulated at least as early as 1873 in Lombard Street, A Description of the Money Market, by Walter Bagehot.
- Insolvent institutions (those with insufficient funds to pay their short-term obligations or those with more debt than assets) should be allowed to fail in an orderly way.
- The true financial position of key financial institutions should be clearly understood by audits or other means. The extent of losses and quality of assets should be known and reported by the institutions.
- Banks that are deemed healthy enough or important enough to survive but require recapitalization from the government providing funds should be done in exchange for ownership rights such as preferred stock, which receives a cash dividend over time.
- Government should take an ownership (equity or stock) interest to the extent that taxpayer assistance is provided so that taxpayers can benefit later. In other words, the government becomes the owner and can later obtain funds by issuing new common stock shares to the public when the nationalized institution is later privatized.
- A special government entity can be useful to administer the program, such as the Resolution Trust Corporation.
- Dividend payments may be restricted to ensure taxpayer money are used for loans and strengthening the bank, rather than payments to investors.
- Interest rate cuts lower lending rates and thus stimulate the economy.

== Criticism ==
- Moral hazard is created, potentially lowering business standards, by the assurance of safety nets.
- A centralized bureaucracy is promoted by allowing government powers to choose winners and losers in the economy. Paul Volcker, chairman of Barack Obama's White House Economic Recovery Advisory Board, said that bailouts create moral hazard. They signal to the firms that they can take reckless risks, and if the risks are realized, taxpayers will pay the losses: "The danger is the spread of moral hazard could make the next crisis much bigger."

On November 24, 2008, American Republican Representative Ron Paul (R–TX) wrote, "In bailing out failing companies, they are confiscating money from productive members of the economy and giving it to failing ones. By sustaining companies with obsolete or unsustainable business models, the government prevents their resources from being liquidated and made available to other companies that can put them to better, more productive use. An essential element of a healthy free market is that both success and failure must be permitted to happen when they are earned. But instead with a bailout, the rewards are reversed – the proceeds from successful entities are given to failing ones. How this is supposed to be good for our economy is beyond me. ... It won't work. It can't work. ... It is obvious to most Americans that we need to reject corporate cronyism, and allow the natural regulations and incentives of the free market to pick the winners and losers in our economy, not the whims of bureaucrats and politicians."

- Significant costs on governments and taxpayers can be caused. In extreme cases, the country's borrowing costs can be raised, or the country can even be bankrupted, as in the Ireland bailout of 2008. The IMF said that "the failure to bail-in unsecured creditors to a bank rescue that cost Irish taxpayers €64 bn and bankrupted the country was based on the view that doing so would have serious adverse 'spillover' effects in other eurozone countries, even though such risks were 'not obvious.'" In the 2012 eurozone crisis, other countries such as Italy were affected by a so-called "doom loop", which increased the cost of government borrowing because bailouts can "torpedo state finances if banks need to be bailed out."
- In the monograph, Banking Bailout Law: A Comparative Study of the United States, United Kingdom and the European Union (Routledge, 2020) Virág Blazsek systematizes past bailout techniques and argues that some of them were loss-making in the past and therefore should not be employed in the future.

== Costs ==
In 2000, the World Bank reported that banking bailouts cost an average of 12.8% of GDP per event:

Governments and, thus ultimately taxpayers, [sic] have largely shouldered the direct costs of banking system collapses. These costs have been large: in our sample of 40 countries governments spent on average 12.8 percent of national GDP to clean up their financial systems.

== Examples ==
- 1970 – Penn Central Railroad
- 1971 – Lockheed Corporation
- 1980 – Chrysler Corporation
- 1984 – Continental Illinois
- 1991 – Executive Life Insurance Company by states assessing other insurers
- 1995 – Mexico Bailout
- 1997 – South Korea Bailout
- 1997 – Indonesia Bailout
- 1998 – Long-Term Capital Management by banks and investment houses, not government.
- 1998 – Brazil Bailout
- 2000 – Argentina Bailout
- 2001-2002 – Brazil Bailout
- 2003 – Parmalat
- 2008 – The Bear Stearns Companies, Inc.
- 2008 – Fannie Mae and Freddie Mac
- 2008 – The Goldman Sachs Group, Inc. by the US federal government and Berkshire Hathaway
- 2008 – Morgan Stanley bailed out by The Bank of Tokyo-Mitsubishi UFJ
- 2008–2009 – American International Group, Inc. multiple times
- 2008 – Emergency Economic Stabilization Act of 2008
- 2008 – 2008 United Kingdom bank rescue package
- 2008 – Citigroup Inc.
- 2008 – Royal Bank of Scotland
- 2008 – Halifax Bank of Scotland
- 2008 – General Motors Corporation and Chrysler LLC: though technically not a bailout, a bridge loan was given to the auto manufacturers by the US government; it is referred to by most as a bailout.
- 2009 – Bank of America to help it absorb known losses that were much greater than revealed to shareholders incurred by its buyout of Merrill Lynch.
- 2009 – CIT Group $3 billion by its bondholders in an attempt to avoid a bankruptcy, which was only delayed.
- 2009 – Dubai and Dubai World bailed out by Abu Dhabi
- 2025 – Argentina bailed out by IMF ($20bn)

=== Irish banking rescue ===
The Irish banking crisis of 2008 has similarities to other banking crisis, but it was unique in that it was the first banking crisis in a country that was a member of the eurozone. That made the Irish government and central bank have unique constraints when the crisis struck. The post-2008 Irish economic downturn was also unusually steep. The impact on Irish government credit was so severe that it was forced to seek assistance from the European Union and the IMF.

=== Swedish banking rescue ===
In 1991 and 1992, a housing bubble in Sweden deflated, resulting in a severe credit crunch and widespread bank insolvency. The causes were similar to those of the subprime mortgage crisis of 2007–2008. In response, the government took the following actions:

- Sweden's government assumed bad bank debts, but banks had to write down losses and issue an ownership interest (common stock) to the government. Shareholders were typically wiped out, but bondholders were protected.
- When distressed assets were later sold, the profits flowed to taxpayers, and the government was able to recoup more money later by selling its shares in the companies in public offerings.
- The government announced that it would guarantee all bank deposits and creditors of the nation's 114 banks.
- Sweden formed a new agency to supervise institutions that needed recapitalization and another to sell off the assets, mainly real estate, which the banks held as collateral.

The bailout initially cost about 4% of Sweden's GDP, later lowered to 0–2% of GDP, depending on the various assumptions if the value of stock that was sold when the nationalized banks were privatized.

=== US savings and loan crisis ===
In the late 1980s and the early 1990s, over 1000 thrift institutions failed as part of the savings and loan crisis. In response, the US established the Resolution Trust Corporation (RTC) in 1989. The cost of this bailout was estimated at $132.1bn to taxpayers.

=== TARP and related programs in US ===
In 2008 and 2009 the US Treasury and the Federal Reserve System bailed out numerous huge banks and insurance companies as well as General Motors and Chrysler. Congress, at the urgent request of US President George W. Bush, passed the Troubled Asset Relief Program (TARP), authorized at $700 billion. The bank sectors repaid the money by December 2009, and TARP actually returned a profit to taxpayers. The separate bailout of Fannie Mae and Freddie Mac, which insure mortgages, totaled $135 billion by October 2010.

The issue of federal bailouts of the banks and big corporations has become a major issue in elections, with the Tea Party movement in particular focusing its attack on bailouts.

== Bailout capitalism ==
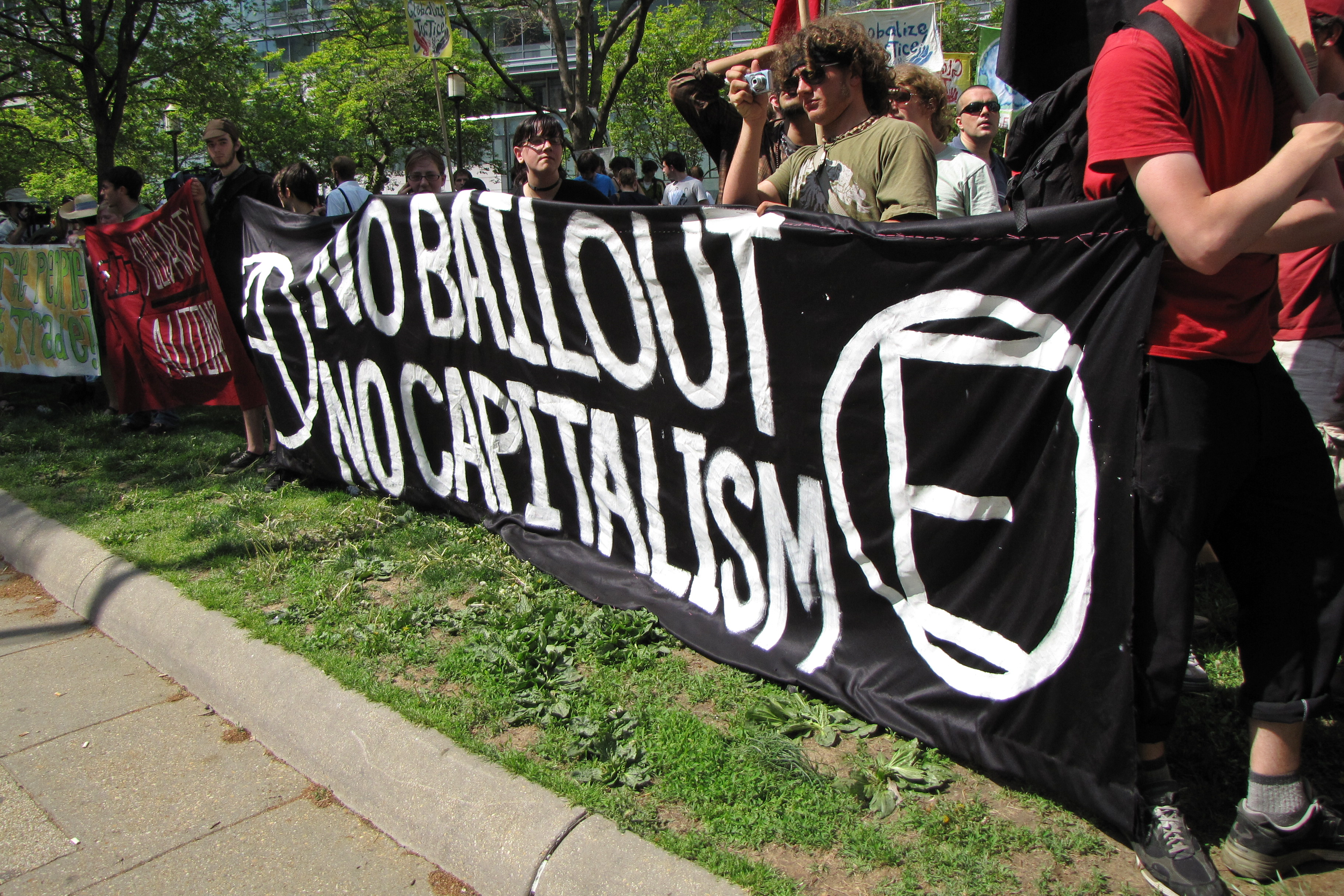
Protest against corporate bailouts and capitalism

Bailout capitalism occurs when the economy is so far out of equilibrium that the only way to stabilize the system is through government support to businesses and households. By keeping the economy afloat through such artificial means the Schumpeterian creative destruction is circumvented and inefficient firms taking excessive risks remain in operation, thereby denying one of the main elements of normal capitalist development.

The support can come in form of purchase of toxic assets as in 2008 and through money creation as in the quantitative easing program of the Federal Reserve and other central banks. This program increased the assets held by the Federal reserve from $0.8 trillion in September 2008 to $9 trillion by May 2022 or by a factor of eleven. The bailouts were repeated in 2020 with the difference that this time smaller business and households also received financial support.

== See also ==
Specific:

- Automotive industry crisis of 2008–2009
- Brown Bailout
- Crédit Lyonnais
- Debtor-in-possession financing
- Emergency Economic Stabilization Act of 2008
- Late 2000s recession
- Lemon socialism
- Subprime mortgage crisis

General:

- Bankruptcy
- Bubble (economics)
- Cash flow
- Financial crisis
- Lender of last resort
- Nationalization
- Recapitalization
- Stock market crash
