= Lindsay Croisdale-Appleby =

British diplomat

His Excellency Lindsay Croisdale-Appleby CMG
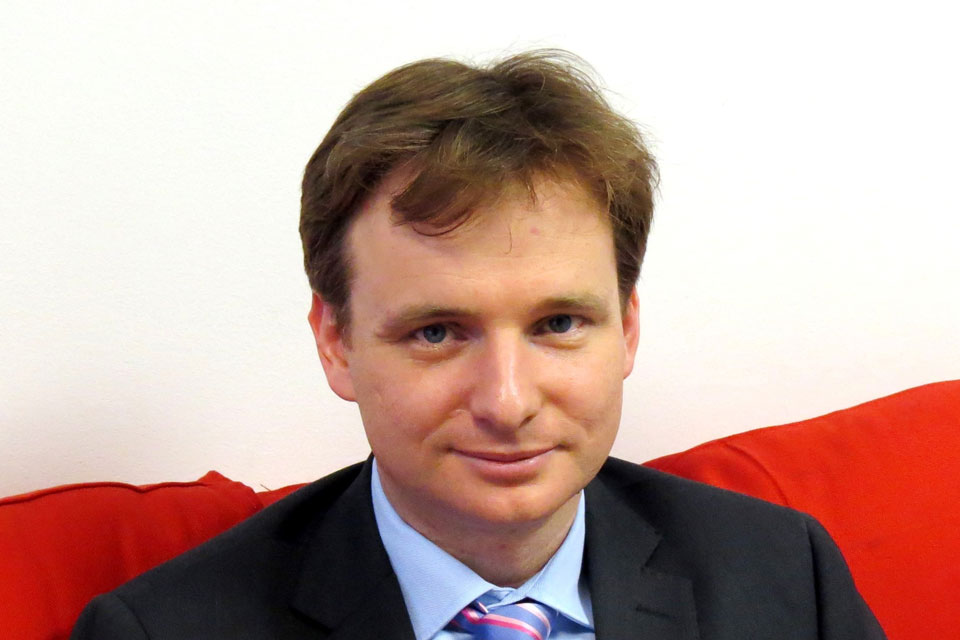

British Ambassador to the European Union
- In office January 2021 – September 2026
- Monarchs: Elizabeth II; Charles III
- Prime Minister: Boris Johnson; Liz Truss; Rishi Sunak; Keir Starmer; Andy Burnham
- Deputy: Will Macfarlane; Caroline Read
- Preceded by: Sir Tim Barrow
- Succeeded by: Dame Caroline Wilson

British Ambassador to Colombia
- In office November 2012 – 2015
- Monarch: Elizabeth II
- Prime Minister: David Cameron
- Preceded by: John Dew
- Succeeded by: Peter Tibber

Personal details
- Born: 12 May 1973 (age 53)
- Education: St Hugh's College, Oxford; Lancaster University (MA)
- Awards: CMG (2020)

Lindsay Redvers Mark Seymour Croisdale-Appleby CMG (born 12 May 1973) is a British diplomat, who was recently Head of the UK Mission to the European Union. Appointed in January 2021, he formally presented his credentials to the President of the European Commission on 29 July 2021. He was Ambassador to Colombia from 2012 to 2015.

== Early life ==
He studied modern history at St Hugh's College, Oxford, and was awarded First Class Honours in 1993. He gained an MA in international relations and international law from Lancaster University.

== Career ==
Croisdale-Appleby joined the Foreign and Commonwealth Office (FCO) in 1996 and served as Principal Private Secretary to the Foreign Secretary 2010–2012. He also worked in the Afghanistan Emergency Unit and as Desk Officer for Nigeria. He then served as Ambassador to Colombia from November 2012 to 2015 before taking up an appointment as Europe Director in the Foreign Office. He was promoted to Director-General, EU Exit at the Foreign Office in 2017. He was Deputy Sherpa and Deputy Chief Negotiator in Taskforce Europe (10 Downing Street) throughout 2020.

He was appointed Companion of the Order of St Michael and St George (CMG) in the 2020 New Year Honours for services to British foreign policy. On 21 January 2021, he was appointed to succeed Sir Tim Barrow as Head of the UK Mission to the European Union.

It was announced that Croisdale-Appleby would be leaving his role as EU Ambassador in 2026, to be replaced by Caroline Wilson. In September 2025, it was reported that Croisdale-Appleby was one of the front-runners from within the Diplomatic Service to succeed Peter Mandelson as British Ambassador to the United States, or as Permanent Representative of the United Kingdom to the United Nations, succeeding Barbara Woodward.

== Personal life ==
He married Barbara Jaimes-Quero in September 2003 and they have a son and a daughter. He has an older brother.

Diplomatic posts
Preceded by Matthew Gould	Principal Private Secretary to the Foreign Secretary; 2010–2012	Succeeded by Thomas Drew
Preceded by John Dew	British Ambassador to Colombia; 2012–2015	Succeeded by Peter Tibber
Preceded by Sir Tim Barrow	British Ambassador to the European Union; 2021–present	Incumbent
