= Jon Cunliffe =

British civil servant (born 1953)

Sir Jon Cunliffe GBE CB

Deputy Governor of the Bank of England for Financial Stability
- In office November 2013 – October 2023
- Governor: Andrew Bailey
- Preceded by: Paul Tucker
- Succeeded by: Sarah Breeden

British Permanent Representative to the EU
- In office January 2012 – November 2013
- Preceded by: Sir Kim Darroch
- Succeeded by: Sir Ivan Rogers

Personal details
- Born: 1 June 1953 (age 73)
- Education: Manchester University
- Occupation: Diplomat, banker

Sir Jonathan Stephen Cunliffe GBE CB (born 2 June 1953) is a senior British civil servant, who served as Deputy Governor of the Bank of England for Financial Stability.

== Biography ==
Cunliffe studied at The University of Manchester. He lectured at the University of Western Ontario, before joining the UK Department of the Environment and Transport in 1980.

He was appointed Deputy Director for International Finance at HM Treasury in 1998, then promoted to Director of International Finance, and then managing director of Macroeconomic Policy and International Finance. In 2001, he became managing director of Finance, Regulation and Industry for a year, before reverting to managing director of Macroeconomic Policy and International Finance. In 2005, Cunliffe's position was promoted to that of Second Permanent Secretary, remaining managing director of Macroeconomic Policy and International Finance, later focussed to managing director of International and Finance.

In 2007, following Gordon Brown's appointment as prime minister, Cunliffe was appointed Head of the European and Global Issues Secretariat. This role included being the Prime Minister's Advisor on International Economic Affairs and on the EU in the Prime Minister's Office. In September 2007 The UK Government launched the "Economic aspects of peace in the Middle East" report, co-authored by Cunliff and Ed Balls.

On 24 June 2011, Number 10 announced that Cunliffe would replace Kim Darroch as British Permanent Representative to the EU in January 2012. He was replaced in the role by Ivan Rogers.

Cunliffe served as Deputy Governor of the Bank of England for Financial Stability. He took up the role in November 2013 and was an ex officio member of the Bank's Financial and Monetary Policy Committees and its Court of Directors. He replaced Paul Tucker when the latter was passed over for promotion to Governor in favour of Mark Carney, and chose instead when the announcement was made in June 2013 to lecture at Harvard. His term came to an end on 31 October 2024.

In September 2020, Cunliffe was appointed to the UK Holocaust Memorial Foundation by the then Communities Secretary Robert Jenrick.

Cunliffe oversaw "Project Bookend", the Bank of England's project to examine the possible economic effects of the UK leaving the EU following the upcoming 2016 United Kingdom European Union membership referendum. This was alleged to have been inadvertently revealed after a senior official emailed details about the project to an editor at The Guardian.

Sir Jon was appointed to the Jersey Fiscal Policy Panel in 2024, as Chair.

In October 2024, Cunliffe was jointly appointed by the UK and Welsh governments to chair the Independent Water Commission, tasked with tackling "systemic issues" in the water sector after a series of pollution scandals. His report, published in July 2025, recommended substantial changes to water regulation frameworks in England and Wales. Despite criticism from some campaigners that the Commission's terms of reference did not allow it to consider renationalisation of the water industry, the Government accepted his initial recommendations to abolish Ofwat and replace it with two new bodies, one each for England and Wales, which would also acquire powers from the Environment Agency and Environment Agency Wales, the UK Drinking Water Inspectorate, and (in England) Natural England to assert greater control over the ownership and management of water firms as part of a strengthened regulatory regime.

=== Views ===
Cunliffe suggested in a March 2014 speech at Chatham House that the domestic banks were too big to fail (TBTF), and instead of the nationalisation process used in the case of HBOS, RBS and threatened for Barclays (all in late 2008), could henceforth be bailed-in.

== Personal life ==
Cunliffe, who is Anglo-Jewish, married his wife at the New London Synagogue in St John's Wood, north-west London. He has two daughters, one of whom, Rachel, works as associate political editor at The New Statesman. He was appointed a Companion of the Order of the Bath (CB) in the New Year Honours 2001, and made a Knight Bachelor in the New Year Honours 2010.

Government offices
| Preceded by unknown | Managing Director, Macroeconomic Policy and International Finance; HM Treasury ?-2001 | Succeeded by unknown |
| Preceded by John Gieve | Managing Director, Financial Regulation and Industry; HM Treasury; 2001–2002 | Succeeded by James Sassoon |
| Preceded by Gus O'Donnell | Managing Director, Macroeconomic Policy and International Finance; HM Treasury; From 2005, also Second Permanent Secretary; 2002–2007 | Succeeded by Stephen Pickford |
| Preceded by Sir Kim Darroch | Head, European and Global Issues Secretariat; Prime Minister's Office; 2007–2012 | Succeeded by Ivan Rogers |
| Preceded by Sir Kim Darroch | British Permanent Representative to the EU; 2012–2013 | Succeeded by Ivan Rogers |
