= Katrina Williams (civil servant) =

British civil servant

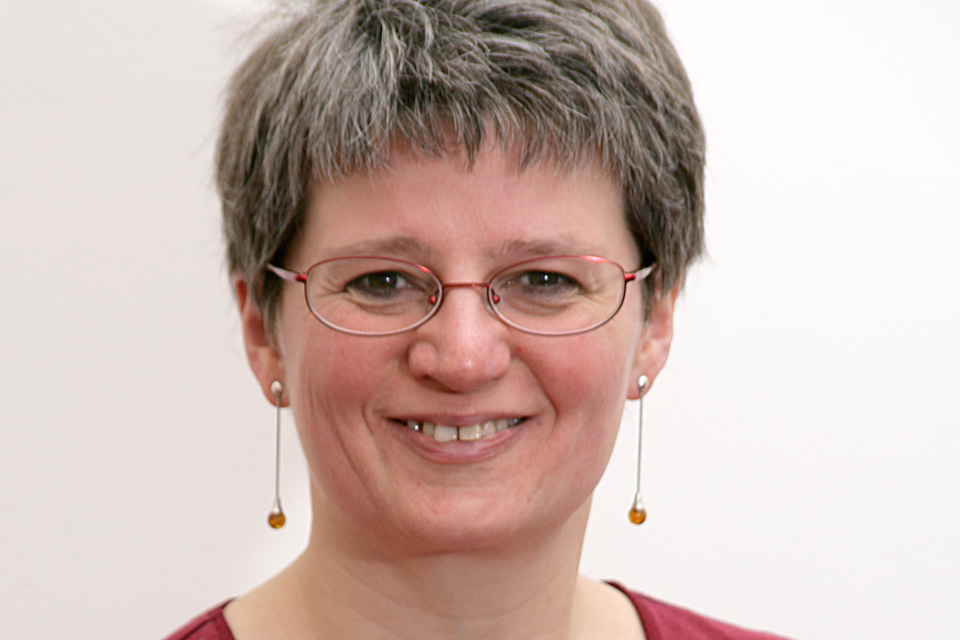
Government photograph

Katrina Williams is a British civil servant who served as the Deputy Ambassador of the United Kingdom to the European Union under Tim Barrow.

== Civil service career ==
Williams joined the civil service in 1983 and spent a decade working in the Ministry of Agriculture, Fisheries and Food. She then joined a team scrutinising the implementation of European Union law. She then moved to work as part of the UK Representation to the EU (UKRep) from 1993 to 1996. She again worked at UKRep from 1999 to 2003 and also worked in the Foreign and Commonwealth Office and the Department of Trade and Industry before being appointed Deputy Head of the European Secretariat in the Cabinet Office in 2003. Her role included coordinating civil service policy on the European Union and advising the Prime Minister, then Tony Blair, on European issues. She also held the role during the UK's presidency of the Council of the European Union in 2005.

Williams then moved to the Department for Environment, Food and Rural Affairs (Defra) as a director covering a range of animal health policies. She was appointed as Director General for Food and Farming in the department in 2008 and served until April 2012 when she was appointed as Director General for Strategy, Evidence and Customers in Defra. Her role involved advising ministers on the department's strategic focus and overseeing all of its international and EU-related work.

On 14 October 2013, Williams was appointed as Director General for International, Science and Resilience in the Department of Energy and Climate Change (DECC). She moved to the Department for Business, Energy and Industrial Strategy (BEIS), but kept the same role. At this time, her private secretary was Akeela Bashir, who was named as one of the BEIS' Religion and Ethnic Minority Role Models in 2016. In December 2016, Williams was appointed as Director General for International and Growth at BEIS, where she had responsibility for cities and local growth, devolution, Europe, international activities, and the Regional Growth Fund. Williams has also been a Policy Leaders Fellow at the Centre for Science and Policy, part of the University of Cambridge.

In March 2017, Williams was appointed by Tim Barrow to serve as Deputy Permanent Representative of the United Kingdom to the European Union. As Deputy Permanent Representative, Williams sits on Coreper I, which is composed of each EU states' deputy permanent representatives and has responsibility for social, environmental and economic issues.
