= Sarah Breeden =

British economist

Deputy Governor of the Bank of England for Financial Stability
- Incumbent
- Assumed office November 2023
- Governor: Andrew Bailey
- Preceded by: Sir Jon Cunliffe

Personal details
- Education: Newnham College, Cambridge; London Business School
- Occupation: Central banker

Sarah Breeden is the Deputy Governor of the Bank of England for Financial Stability from November 2023. She succeeded Sir Jon Cunliffe.

Breeden sits on the rate-setting Monetary Policy Committee (MPC) and the Financial Policy Committee, which she will chair in the absence of the Governor of the Bank of England.

She graduated with an upper second class honours degree in economics from Newnham College, Cambridge in 1990, and with an MSc in finance from London Business School in 1997. Breeden joined the Bank of England in 1991 as assistant private secretary to the then Governor.

Breeden's term as Deputy Governor for Financial Stability runs from 1 November 2023 to 31 October 2028. In that role she is a member of the Monetary Policy Committee, Financial Policy Committee, Prudential Regulation Committee and the Bank's Court of Directors. She leads the Bank's work on financial stability, supervision of financial market infrastructures, international issues, payments innovation and financial technology, and has deputy-governor responsibility for climate-related monetary and financial stability risks. Before becoming deputy governor, she was Executive Director for International Banks Supervision from 2015 to 2021, Executive Director for UK Deposit Takers Supervision from 2019 to 2021, and Executive Director for Financial Stability Strategy and Risk from 2021 to 2023.

She is an executive sponsor of the Bank's LGBTQ+ network.
