= Virág Blazsek =

Hungarian legal scholar

- Born: February 2, 1980 (age 46); Veszprém, Hungary
- Education: Eötvös Loránd University (JD, PhD); George Washington University (LLM); Central European University (LLM, SJD); Suffolk University (LLM)
- Occupations: Lawyer, legal scholar
- Employer: University of Leeds
- Known for: Banking law, financial regulation, bank bailouts, financial crisis management
- Notable work: Banking Bailout Law: A Comparative Study of the United States, United Kingdom and the European Union (Routledge, 2020)
- Website: essl.leeds.ac.uk/law/staff/1546/dr-virag-blazsek

Virág Blazsek (born February 2, 1980) is a Hungarian and U.S.-trained legal scholar known for her research on financial regulation, bank bailouts, and corporate insolvency.

In 2021, Blazsek joined the faculty of the British University of Leeds School of Law, a Russell Group research university, in Leeds, England, where she teaches commercial law, arbitration law, banking law, financial regulation, and corporate insolvency law. She is the deputy director of the Centre for Business Law and Practice. From 2022 to 2025, she also served as study abroad program coordinator, significantly increasing the program size during her tenure, and overseeing the largest study abroad cohort in the School of Law's history. Blazsek is listed as an arbitrator of the OHADA Common Court of Justice and Arbitration (CCJA) (Africa). She is an invited member of the ILA Insolvency Scholars Forum (ISF) and the UNIDROIT's Working Group on Insolvency of Insurance Enterprises.

She has held visiting professorships at the Eötvös Loránd University (ELTE) Faculty of Law, Central European University (CEU), Budapest Business School, and visiting scholar appointments at Fordham University School of Law, Columbia Law School, Emory University School of Law, and the European University Institute. Blazsek has been a co-convenor of the Banking and Financial Services Law subject section of the Society of Legal Scholars (United Kingdom and Ireland).

== Early life and education ==
Blazsek was born and raised in Veszprém, Hungary. She attended Dózsa György Elementary and Middle School, graduating in 1994, and graduated from Lovassy László High School in 1998. Experiencing first-hand Hungary's political, social, and economic transformation from communism to democracy in the 1990s has informed her scholarship and comparative-historical perspective to date.

She earned Juris Doctor and PhD degrees from the Faculty of Law of Eötvös Loránd University (ELTE) in Budapest. She was a member of the István Bibó College for Advanced Studies (a special honors society/extracurricular studies program) at ELTE Faculty of Law. She earned an LL.M. and S.J.D. in international business law (summa cum laude) from Central European University (CEU), an LL.M. in business and finance law from The George Washington University Law School, where she received a Thomas Buergenthal Scholarship. She also earned an LL.M. in U.S. and global business law from Suffolk University Law School.

== Career ==
Blazsek was admitted to the Hungarian Bar in 2008. She practised corporate, commercial, arbitration, investment, and banking law for a decade, serving as an attorney, in-house counsel, and managerial professional at major institutions including OTP Bank in Budapest, Winston & Strawn in Paris, and the United Nations Joint Staff Pension Fund's Office of Investment Management in New York City. Having worked on regulatory matters in the financial sector before, during, and after the 2008 Global Financial Crisis has shaped her doctoral research topic choice, scholarly interests, and understanding of financial crisis management frameworks.

== Academic work ==
Her scholarship focuses on financial regulation, particularly the legal aspects of bank rescues and failures during financial crises. She investigates regulatory frameworks for financial stability, including comparative analysis of rules in the United States, the United Kingdom, the EU, and other jurisdictions. She has also worked on issues such as sovereign debt regulation, banking resolution mechanisms, and Financial Technology (FinTech). She has presented her research at more than 50 conferences and workshops internationally; for example, she delivered a keynote address at the Legal Tech in Leeds annual conference in 2025.

Her monograph, Banking Bailout Law: A Comparative Study of the United States, United Kingdom and the European Union (Routledge, 2020) examines bank bailout and resolution techniques through case studies from the United States, the EU, the United Kingdom, Spain and Hungary. It identifies the advantages and disadvantages of different legal and regulatory approaches and proposes a regulatory framework intended to better address future financial crises. The book is available in more than 1,100 libraries globally (according to WorldCat), and it has been discussed at more than a dozen events and mentioned, among others, in Columbia Law School's Blue Sky Blog and Duke University School of Law's The FinReg Blog. Blazsek was invited to deliver book talks as part of Cornell University's Berger International Speaker Series, as well as at The George Washington University, the University of Deusto School of Law's YouTube Channel, and Queen Mary University of London's Mile End Institute, receiving hundreds of views.

In an op-ed published in American Banker, she wrote that "Bank-specific insolvency proceedings have been adopted in the U.S. and other G20 nations to prevent future taxpayer-funded bank bailouts. (...) That framework has proven to be unworkable for political reasons, as shown by the 2016-2017 and 2023 European and U.S. bank bailouts." Blazsek also contributed a chapter to the Bank of Italy's comprehensive study on Resolution Authorities and their institutional settings in the 27 EU member states.

Blazsek's Written Evidence on "AI in Financial Services" was published by the UK Parliament's Treasury Committee. She proposed broader democratic authorisation (preferably through a referendum), given the profound changes AI might bring to our society and economy. She also contributed to a Public Consultation on "GenAI in legal services" by the Ministry of Law, Singapore, proposing that "legal service providers should be encouraged to have company-level energy strategies, such as investing in energy-efficient hardware, software, and promoting internal practices that work towards sustainable energy consumption." She also published a blog article and a podcast (with Professor Danat Valizade) on the energy policy aspects of AI in financial and legal services.

She has organized or co-organized numerous academic conferences, including the University of Leeds Inaugural Conference on Recent Developments in Insolvency Law in 2022, the Leeds Financial and FinTech Law Conference in 2023, The Future of Business Law workshop series, the New Technologies and Research Methods in Business Law seminar series, and the annual Conference on Financial Law and Regulation.

She is fluent in Hungarian, English, Spanish, and she also speaks German.

== Recognition ==
- DAAD scholarship award (University of Heidelberg, 2001)
- Socrates-Erasmus scholarship award (Universitat de Girona, 2001-02)
- Full doctoral fellowship award (Central European University, 2014-18)
- Thomas Buergenthal scholarship award (George Washington University School of Law, 2018-19)
- Michael Beverly Innovation Fellowship (twice, 2022-24)
