= Ivan Rogers =

British civil servant

Sir Ivan Rogers KCMG

Permanent Representative of the United Kingdom to the European Union
- In office 4 November 2013 – 3 January 2017
- Prime Minister: David Cameron; May
- Foreign Secretary: William Hague; Philip Hammond; Boris Johnson
- Preceded by: Jon Cunliffe
- Succeeded by: Tim Barrow

Prime Minister's Adviser for Europe and Global Issues
- In office 2012–2013
- Prime Minister: David Cameron
- Preceded by: Jon Cunliffe
- Succeeded by: Tom Scholar

Principal Private Secretary to the Prime Minister
- In office 2003–2006
- Prime Minister: Tony Blair
- Preceded by: Jeremy Heywood
- Succeeded by: Olly Robbins

Personal details
- Born: Mark Ivan Rogers; March 1960 (age 66)
- Education: Balliol College, Oxford

Sir Mark Ivan Rogers KCMG (born March 1960) is a British former senior civil servant who was the Permanent Representative of the United Kingdom to the European Union from 4 November 2013 until his resignation on 3 January 2017.

== Education ==
Rogers was educated at Bournemouth School in his home town, the south-coast town of Bournemouth in Dorset, at which his father taught history. After a gap year in Bremen, in north-western Germany, he studied History for three years at Balliol College at the University of Oxford, followed by the École Normale Supérieure in Paris. This was followed by another three years at Balliol, at which he pursued doctoral studies in the history of socio-biology and eugenic thinking on the political left, though he did not finish his degree.

== Career ==
Rogers successfully applied for a place on the civil service's 'fast track', and chose the Department of Health and Social Security. In 1992, he was seconded to the Treasury and did not return to his former department. He served in the Treasury, including as Private Secretary, to Kenneth Clarke, Chancellor of the Exchequer. He then was seconded to the European Commission as Chief of Staff to Sir Leon Brittan, returning to be Director, European Strategy and Policy and later Director of Budget and Public Finances under Gordon Brown.

In 2003, Rogers was chosen to succeed Jeremy (later Sir Jeremy) Heywood as the Principal Private Secretary to the Prime Minister, Tony Blair. After three years in this role, Rogers left the civil service in 2006 to become Head of the UK Public Sector Group at Citigroup. In 2010 Rogers transferred to be Head of the Public Sector Industry Group, UK and Ireland, at Barclays Capital from 2010 to 2011.

In 2012, Rogers returned to the civil service as the Prime Minister's Adviser for Europe and Global Issues and the Head of the European and Global Issues Secretariat, based in the Prime Minister's Office at Number 10, replacing Jon Cunliffe who had become the senior British diplomat at the EU. On Cunliffe's move to the Bank of England the next year, Rogers succeeded him again, moving to Brussels in 2013.

In 2015, Rogers was paid a salary of between £170,000 and £174,999 by the Foreign Office, making him one of the 328 most highly paid people in the British public sector at that time.

Following the Brexit referendum in June 2016, Rogers became a key civil servant in the negotiations to leave.

== Personal views of the EU and resignation ==
In December 2016, an internal memo Rogers had written suggesting difficulties for the agreement was leaked. According to this leaked memo, Sir Ivan privately held the view that a settlement between the UK and the European Union might not be reached for 10 years, if at all, which did not reflect the Government's view. Questions were raised in the press whether Downing Street could any longer have confidence in his advice. He resigned on 3 January 2017, nine months ahead of the nominal end of his posting in October 2017.

On 11 October 2018, in Cambridge, Rogers delivered a lecture on "Brexit as Revolution", in which he said that he continued to think that the risks of an accidental "no-deal" Brexit caused by persistent British misreading of others' incentives and views, and by the EU's frequent inability to comprehend UK politics, were higher than was in the price.

In a lecture that Rogers delivered on 13 December 2018 at the University of Liverpool, he said that the EU was always adroit at reframing things that have already been agreed, such as the "backstop", in ways that "make the medicine slip down".

Rogers was very critical of the strategy pursued by the British team in their negotiations with the EU following the triggering of Article 50. On 4 March 2019, while speaking to the Institute for Government, he pointed out the similarities in the tactics adopted by Theresa May's government and the tactics used by David Cameron's government in their renegotiations with the EU before the 2016 referendum. He said that May and her advisers' approach was to attempt to deal directly with the leaders of the major governments within the EU but the "reflex in the British system (is) always to think that we can deal direct with the organ grinders and not the monkeys: it never works like that. It didn't work like that in the Cameron renegotiation either. That stuff is not done in the way British politics works, leader to leader. It's done via the bureaucrats, and the sherpas, and the people at the top of the institutions."

== Book ==
- 9 Lessons in Brexit. Short Books Ltd, 7. February 2019, ISBN 978-1780723990

== Honours ==
Rogers was appointed Knight Commander of the Order of St Michael and St George (KCMG) in the 2016 New Year Honours.

== Offices held ==
Government offices
Preceded by Jeremy Heywood	Principal Private Secretary to the Prime Minister; 2003–2006	Succeeded by Olly Robbins
Preceded by Sir Jon Cunliffe	Prime Minister's Adviser, European and Global Issues; 2012–2013	Succeeded by Tom Scholar
Diplomatic posts
Preceded by Sir Jon Cunliffe	British Permanent Representative to the European Union; 2013–2017	Succeeded by Sir Tim Barrow

== See also ==
- Tim Barrow § Ambassadorships and EU work
