= Tim Barrow =

British diplomat and senior civil servant (born 1964)

The Right Honourable The Lord Barrow GCMG LVO MBE
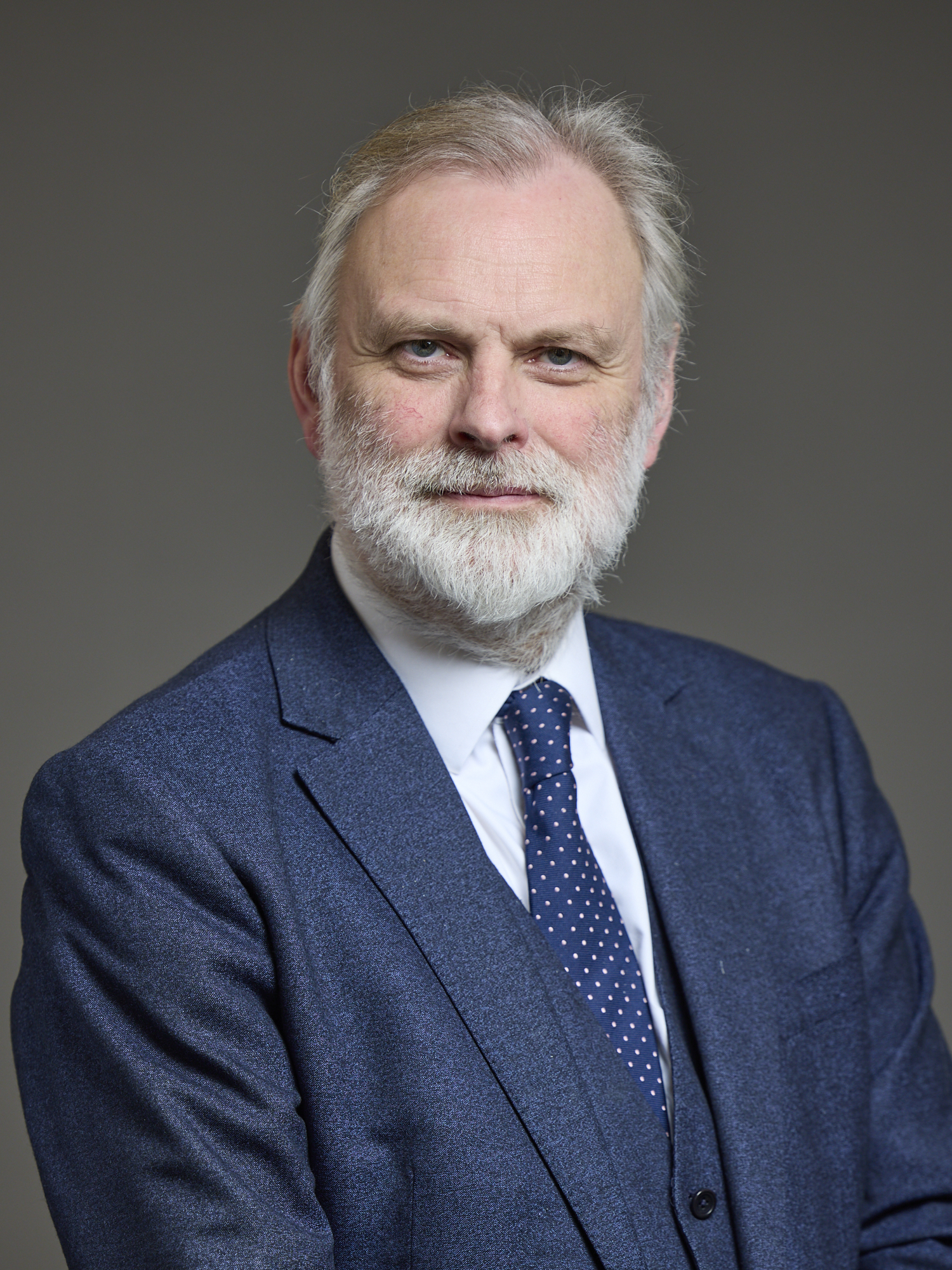
- Official portrait, 2026

Member of the House of Lords
- Lord Temporal
- Life peerage 18 July 2025

United Kingdom National Security Adviser
- In office 14 September 2022 – 8 November 2024
- Prime Minister: Liz Truss; Rishi Sunak; Keir Starmer
- Preceded by: Stephen Lovegrove
- Succeeded by: Jonathan Powell

Second Permanent Under-Secretary and Political Director of the Foreign, Commonwealth and Development Office
- In office 1 September 2020 – 6 September 2022
- Prime Minister: Boris Johnson
- Preceded by: Richard Moore
- Succeeded by: Christian Turner

British Ambassador to the European Union
- In office 1 February 2020 – 21 January 2021
- Monarch: Elizabeth II
- Prime Minister: Boris Johnson
- Deputy: Katrina Williams
- Preceded by: Office established
- Succeeded by: Lindsay Croisdale-Appleby

Permanent Representative of the United Kingdom to the European Union
- In office 4 January 2017 – 31 January 2020
- Monarch: Elizabeth II
- Prime Minister: Theresa May; Boris Johnson
- Deputy: Katrina Williams
- Preceded by: Ivan Rogers
- Succeeded by: Office abolished

British Ambassador to Russia
- In office 1 November 2011 – 1 January 2016
- Monarch: Elizabeth II
- Prime Minister: David Cameron
- Preceded by: Anne Pringle
- Succeeded by: Laurie Bristow

British Ambassador to Ukraine
- In office 1 July 2006 – 28 March 2008
- Monarch: Elizabeth II
- Prime Minister: Tony Blair; Gordon Brown
- Preceded by: Robert Brinkley
- Succeeded by: Leigh Turner

Personal details
- Born: 15 February 1964 (age 62)
- Party: None (crossbencher)
- Education: Arnold Lodge School; Warwick School
- Alma mater: Brasenose College, Oxford

Timothy Earle Barrow, Baron Barrow (born 15 February 1964) is a British diplomat, who served as Permanent Representative of the United Kingdom to the European Union from 2017 to 2020 and as the British Ambassador to the European Union from 2020 to 2021. He served as National Security Adviser from 2022 to 2024. He has been a member of the House of Lords since 2025.

Barrow was appointed as Permanent Representative in January 2017 following the resignation of his predecessor, Ivan Rogers, and played an important role in the United Kingdom Brexit negotiations. He was responsible on 29 March 2017 for formally invoking Article 50 of the Treaty on the European Union on behalf of the UK. When the United Kingdom left the EU on 31 January 2020, Barrow became HM Ambassador to the European Union.

Barrow has been a civil servant in the Foreign and Commonwealth Office (FCO) since 1986. He served in London, Kyiv, Moscow and Brussels before his appointment as the British Ambassador to Ukraine in 2006. In 2008, he became the Ambassador to the Western European Union and the UK Representative to the Political and Security Committee. From 2011 to 2016, he served as the British Ambassador to Russia before returning to London as the Foreign, Commonwealth and Development Office's Political Director.

== Education and personal life ==
Barrow was born in 1964 and attended Arnold Lodge School in Leamington Spa, Warwickshire, before attending Warwick School. He then went to Brasenose College, Oxford where he read English. Barrow is married to Alison née Watts (now Lady Barrow) and they have two sons and two daughters.

== Career ==
=== Early diplomatic career (1986–2000) ===
Barrow joined the Foreign and Commonwealth Office (FCO) in 1986 and worked as a desk officer in the Western European Department from 1987 to 1988 and the United Nations in New York. He then did Russian language training for a year before taking part in the British Days Exhibition in Kyiv, the capital of Ukraine, in 1989. From 1990 to 1993, he was the second secretary at the British Embassy in Moscow, and then returned to London where he was head of the Russia Section in the Foreign Office for a year. From 1994 to 1996, he was private secretary to a Minister of State for Foreign Affairs. Barrow was then appointed as a first secretary of the United Kingdom Representation to the European Union, serving from 1996 to 1998, before returning again to London as a private secretary to Robin Cook the Foreign Secretary.

=== London, Brussels, Kyiv and Moscow (2000–2017) ===
In 2000, Barrow was appointed as head of the Common Foreign and Security Department at the Foreign Office, and in 2003 was appointed as the assistant director of the Europe Directorate - External, including during the UK's presidency of the Council of the European Union in 2005. He was also involved in negotiations over the Treaty of Lisbon at this time. Barrow served as deputy political director at the Foreign Office from 2005 to 2006 before his appointment as Her Majesty's Ambassador to Ukraine in 2006. He took up the post in July that year and held it until 2008 when he returned to Brussels as UK Representative to the Political and Security Committee and Ambassador to the Western European Union.

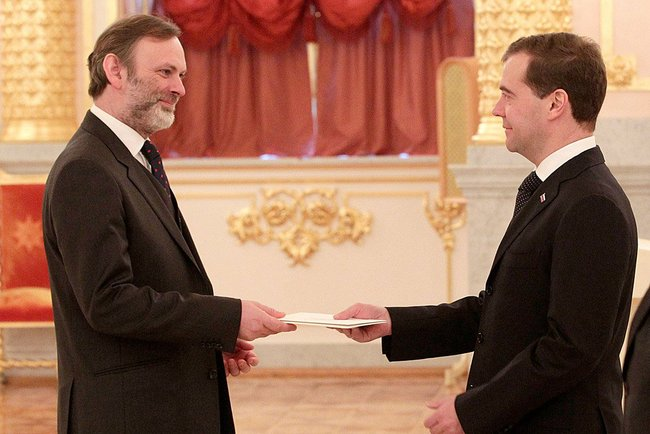
Barrow presents his letter of credence to Dmitry Medvedev, then-President of Russia, on 7 December 2011.

In August 2011, Barrow was announced as Her Majesty's Ambassador to the Russian Federation, to succeed Anne Pringle in November that year. Shortly after his arrival, he oversaw the visit of David Cameron, the Prime Minister, to Russia. This was part a wider policy implemented by Cameron for a "reset" in relations with Russia following the fallout of the poisoning of Alexander Litvinenko. In August 2012, he was summoned to the Russian Foreign Ministry over the stoning of the Russian Embassy in London by anti-war activists protesting Russian involvement in the Syrian Civil War.

In February 2015, following the murder of opposition politician Boris Nemtsov, Barrow hosted the former Prime Minister John Major. He also attended Nemtsov's wake with Major and joined other Western ambassadors in laying flowers at a tribute to him near Red Square. Politico reported that he was a "low-key" ambassador, which allowed him to avoid some of the vilification aimed at other Western diplomats. However, this masked some significant achievements that he made in a tenure marked by Russian military interventions in Ukraine and Syria and a crackdown on dissent by Vladimir Putin. Aleksey Pushkov, who led the State Duma foreign affairs committee during Barrow's tenure, commented that "He created the impression of a real professional who was able to advocate the positions of his own government, while also striving to find out and understand Russia's positions."

After leaving his role in Moscow, Barrow was appointed briefly as acting political director at the Foreign Office in London, succeeding Simon Gass. This role included overseeing international organisations, multilateral policy, Eastern Europe, the Middle East and North Africa, Africa, South Asia and Afghanistan.

=== Permanent Representative to the EU (2017–2020) ===
On 3 January 2017, Ivan Rogers resigned from his position as Permanent Representative of the United Kingdom to the European Union, citing frustration over the government's negotiating strategy in their planned withdrawal from the European Union. The next day, Barrow was appointed to replace him. A Downing Street spokesman said Barrow was "a seasoned and tough negotiator, with extensive experience of securing UK objectives in Brussels." Charles Crawford, who worked with Barrow in the early 1990s, commented that he "understands Brussels and the EU, but he is not pickled in its ghastly processes." The Financial Times reported that Barrow's appointment was opposed by Oliver Robbins, the permanent secretary at the Department for Exiting the European Union, who wanted to take control of negotiations with the EU himself. However, the Foreign Office overruled him.

Barrow appointed two senior civil servants to his team in Brussels in March 2017. They were Katrina Williams, a director-general at the Department for Business, Energy and Industrial Strategy who was appointed as deputy permanent representative, and Simon Case, Principal Private Secretary to the Prime Minister, who was appointed as head of the UK–EU Partnership. On 20 March, Barrow appeared before the European Scrutiny Committee to give evidence on UK–EU relations prior to the invocation of Article 50. During the hearing, he warned that it may not be possible to leave the European Union without paying anything, as some Conservative MPs had suggested, and that "other legal opinions" offered "a different interpretation".

Barrow was responsible for handing over the letter of United Kingdom's invocation of Article 50 of the Treaty on European Union in Brussels on 29 March 2017 to European Council President Donald Tusk.

On 17 October 2018, Barrow accompanied British Prime Minister Theresa May to the European Council summit in Brussels. After the Council meeting, Barrow wrote to the Secretaries General of the Council and Commission of the European Union on behalf of the UK. His letters stated that the UK had no doubt over its sovereignty of Gibraltar, including British Gibraltar Territorial Waters, and that Gibraltar's sovereignty would never be transferred against the democratically expressed wishes of its citizens.

After the UK left the EU on 31 January 2020, Barrow's portfolio changed to British Ambassador to the European Union effective 1 February, being succeeded in 2021 by Lindsay Croisdale-Appleby.

=== National Security Adviser (2022–2024) ===
On 14 September 2022, he was appointed National Security Adviser to Prime Minister Liz Truss and remained in the role under Rishi Sunak and the first few weeks in government of Keir Starmer. He was appointed as the British Ambassador to the United States but following the 2024 United Kingdom general election, his appointment was annulled by the new Labour government, who later chose Peter Mandelson for the role.

=== House of Lords ===
On 17 June 2025, it was announced that he was to be awarded a life peerage, and would sit in the House of Lords as a crossbencher. He was created Baron Barrow, of Penrith in the County of Cumbria on 18 July 2025. He was introduced to the Lords on 24 July 2025.

== Honours ==
GCMG breast star

Barrow was appointed a Member of the Order of the British Empire (MBE) in the 1994 New Year Honours, and later in that year made a Lieutenant of the Royal Victorian Order (LVO). In the 2006 Birthday Honours, he was appointed a Companion of the Order of St Michael and St George (CMG), and in the 2015 New Year Honours promoted to Knight Commander of the same Order (KCMG) for "services to British foreign policy and interests in Russia". Following the 2020 Birthday Honours, Barrow was again promoted to Knight Grand Cross of the Order of St Michael and St George (GCMG) for "services to British foreign policy".

== See also ==
- Earle baronets

Diplomatic posts
Preceded by Robert Brinkley	British Ambassador to Ukraine; 2006–2008	Succeeded by Leigh Turner
Preceded by Anne Pringle	British Ambassador to Russia; 2011–2015	Succeeded by Laurie Bristow
Preceded by Ivan Rogers	British Permanent Representative to the European Union; 2017–2020	Title abolished
New title	British Ambassador to the European Union; 2020–2021	Succeeded by Lindsay Croisdale-Appleby
Political offices
Preceded by Stephen Lovegrove	National Security Adviser; 2022–2024	Succeeded by Jonathan Powell
