= Caroline Wilson (diplomat) =

British diplomat (born 1970)

Her Excellency Dame Caroline Wilson DCMG
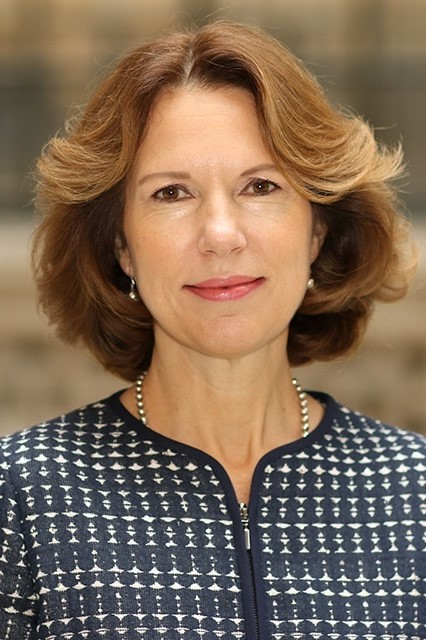
- Wilson in 2020

British Ambassador to the European Union
- Incumbent
- Assumed office September 2026
- Monarch: Charles III
- Prime Minister: Andy Burnham
- Preceded by: Sir Lindsay Croisdale-Appleby

British Ambassador to China
- In office September 2020 – July 2025
- Monarchs: Elizabeth II; Charles III
- Prime Minister: Boris Johnson; Liz Truss; Rishi Sunak; Keir Starmer
- Preceded by: Dame Barbara Woodward
- Succeeded by: Peter Wilson

British Consul General to Hong Kong and Macao
- In office September 2012 – September 2016
- Preceded by: Andrew Seaton
- Succeeded by: Andrew Heyn

Personal details
- Born: Caroline Elizabeth Wilson; 12 August 1970 (age 56) Wimbledon, London, England
- Education: Sevenoaks School
- Alma mater: Downing College, Cambridge (MA); Université libre de Bruxelles (MA)

Chinese name
- Traditional Chinese: 吳若蘭
- Simplified Chinese: 吴若兰
Transcriptions
Standard Mandarin
- Hanyu Pinyin: Wú Ruòlán
Yue: Cantonese
- Jyutping: Ng^{4} Joek^{6}laan^{4}

Dame Caroline Elizabeth Wilson DCMG (born 12 August 1970) is a British diplomat and lawyer who is British Ambassador to the European Union since September 2026. Wilson previously served as the British Ambassador to China from September 2020 to July 2025.

== Early life and education ==
Wilson was born on 12 August 1970. She was educated at Sevenoaks School (Sixth Form) and attended Downing College, Cambridge, where she gained an MA in law. She was called to the Bar at Middle Temple in 1993, then gained a degree in European Community law (licence spéciale en droit européen) at the Institute for European Studies of the Université libre de Bruxelles.

== Career ==
Wilson joined the Foreign and Commonwealth Office (FCO) in 1995 and served in Beijing, Brussels and Moscow in various posts. She was the British Consul General to Hong Kong and Macao from 2012 to 2016. She became Europe Director at the FCO in 2016. She appeared in a 2018 BBC documentary titled Inside the Foreign Office, which saw her accompany then-Foreign Secretary Boris Johnson on diplomatic engagements in Europe.

In June 2020, she was appointed as British Ambassador to China; she succeeded Dame Barbara Woodward in September 2020.

In November 2021, The Times and other newspapers reported "a row" between British foreign secretary Liz Truss and Wilson relating to a letter Wilson had sent to National Security Council members about relations with the Chinese government, questioning Truss's hawkish stance against China.

In May 2025, it was announced that Peter Wilson would succeed Caroline Wilson, who will transfer to another Diplomatic Service appointment. In September 2025, it was reported that Wilson would be appointed British Ambassador to the European Union, succeeding Lindsay Croisdale-Appleby.

== Personal life ==
In addition to her native English, Wilson speaks French, German, Russian, Mandarin Chinese, and Cantonese.

== Honours ==
Wilson was appointed Companion of the Order of St Michael and St George (CMG) in the 2016 New Year Honours and Dame Commander of the Order of St Michael and St George (DCMG) in the 2021 New Year Honours for services to British foreign policy.

She was called as a Bencher at Middle Temple in 2013. In 2018, she became an honorary fellow of her alma mater, Downing College, Cambridge.

Diplomatic posts
Preceded by Andrew Seaton	British Consul-General to Hong Kong and Macao; 2012–2016	Succeeded by Andrew Heyn
Preceded by Dame Barbara Woodward	British Ambassador to China; 2020–present	Incumbent
