= Denis Matthews =

English pianist and musicologist (1919–1988)

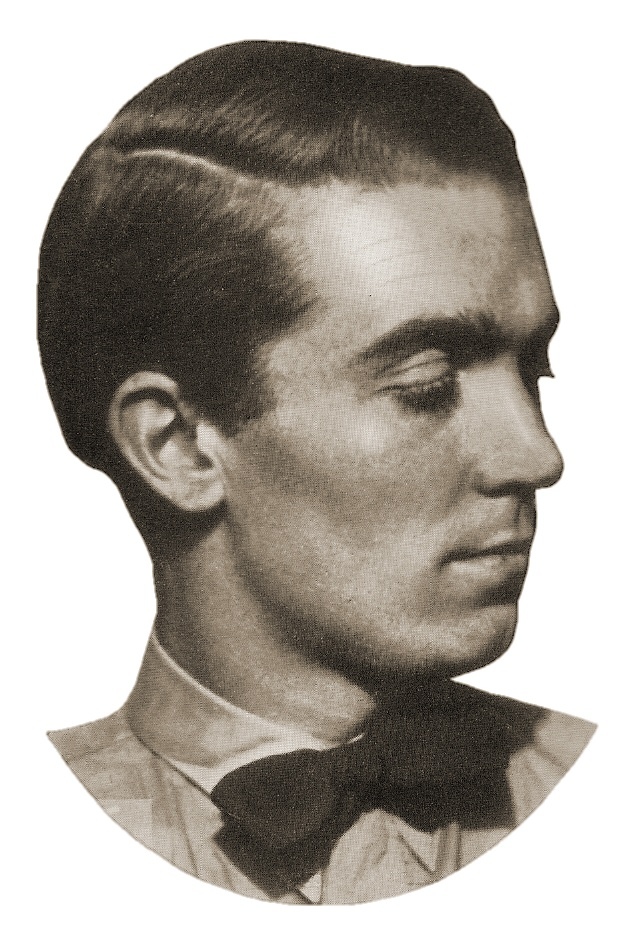
- Born: 27 February 1919; Coventry, England
- Died: 25 December 1988 (aged 69); Birmingham, England
- Education: Royal Academy of Music
- Occupation: Pianist

Denis Matthews (27 February 1919 – 25 December 1988) was an English pianist and musicologist whose performing career flourished after the war, during the 1950s and into the 1960s. He later turned increasingly to broadcasting, writing and teaching.

== Biography ==
Denis James Matthews was born in Coventry, the son of a motor salesman. He attended Arnold Lodge School, Leamington Spa, from 1927 to 1932 and Warwick School from October 1932 to the summer of 1936, when he left to study at the Royal Academy of Music. While there, he lodged with Harold Craxton and his wife Essie in St John's Wood. He had made his professional debut in 1939 and even started to compose - his Five Sketches for violin and piano were broadcast by Isolde Menges and Howard Ferguson in May 1940. But then the war interrupted things. Matthews joined up in 1940, serving with the RAF until 1946.

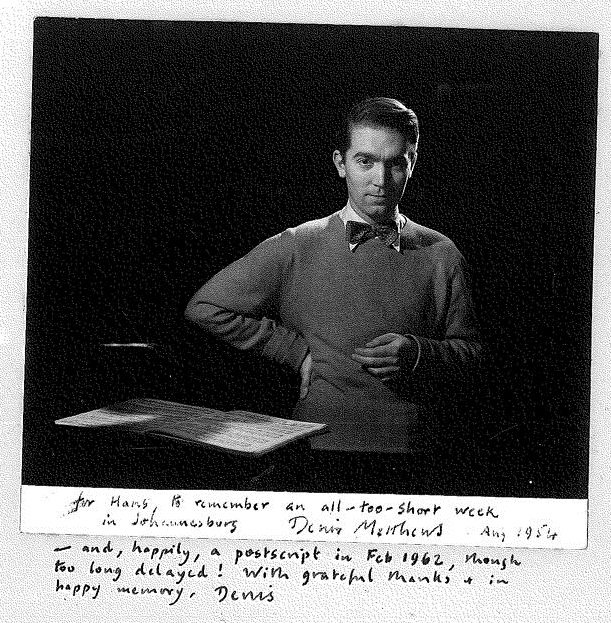
Dedicated photo, 1954 tour of Southern Africa.

Resuming his professional career after the war, he toured extensively as a concert pianist and formed successful partnerships with the Griller Quartet and the Amadeus Quartet. His particular liking was for the music of Haydn, Mozart, Beethoven and Schubert, and his edition of the Mozart piano sonatas, prepared with Stanley Sadie, became widely used. He also produced many recordings, especially of modern British piano music, and performed the Proms premiere of Edmund Rubbra's Piano Concerto in 1956. During the 1950s and 1960s he was a regular broadcaster and presenter on musical subjects for BBC Radio.

His autobiography In Pursuit of Music appeared in 1966. The following year he was interviewed for the BBC radio programme Desert Island Discs. Between 1971 and 1984 he was Professor of Music at Newcastle University. He wrote a biography of Arturo Toscanini in 1982, and in 1985 he published a study of Beethoven in the Dent "Master Musicians" series. His short book on Beethoven's piano sonatas (published as a BBC Music Guide) is particularly valuable. In the few years before his death, he and his third wife, the pianist and teacher Beryl Chempin, both taught at the Birmingham School of Music.

== Personal life ==
Matthews was married three times, to three musicians. His first wife was the cellist Mira Howe, with whom he had one son and three daughters. They divorced in 1960. His second wife was the pianist Brenda McDermott. They married in 1963 and had one son and one daughter. Their marriage lasted until 1986, and then he married Beryl Chempin. Subject to bouts of depression, Matthews committed suicide on 25 December 1988. Beryl Chempin died in 2012.
