= Arnold Lodge School =

Coordinates: 52.297245°N 1.5359756°W

- Leamington Spa, Warwickshire, CV32 5TW; England

Information
- Type: Independent day school
- Motto: Latin: Respice Finem 'Look to the end'
- Established: 1864
- Directors: Gareth Newman, Wynford Dore
- Headteacher: David Preston
- Gender: Coeducational
- Age: 4 to 18
- Enrolment: 300
- Houses: Dedicas, Veritas and Amicus
- Colours: Maroon and Navy
- Website: http://www.arnoldlodge.com/

Arnold Lodge School is a co-educational independent school in Leamington Spa, Warwickshire, England, founded in 1864. The school has around 300 day pupils, ranging from Reception aged four, to Sixth Form pupils aged eighteen.

The school is based in central Royal Leamington Spa, housed in a mixture of Victorian and modern buildings. Originally a dame school kept by Mrs Worthington at 2 Lillington Place, Leamington Spa, in 1864 the school was taken over by a former Assistant Master at Leamington College, Mr Alfred Kirk. An admirer of Dr Thomas Arnold of Rugby School, he named the school Arnold Lodge School. Originally the oldest prep school in Warwickshire, it extended its admission age to the GCSE years in 2008 and launched a Sixth Form in September 2013.

The school was nominated for Senior School of the Year in the national TES Independent School Awards 2020.

== Enrolment to Arnold Lodge ==
Arnold Lodge has key entry points into Reception, Year 3, Year 7 and Year 12. While admission to Arnold Lodge will usually be for one of these year groups, admission into other year groups is also possible during the academic year.

Arnold Lodge has an assessment process for admission to the school from Year 3 and up with a series of assessment days taking place across the academic year. The entrance assessment focuses on the whole child and their academic potential rather than their current academic attainment.

== Notable former pupils ==
- Faris Badwan, singer with alternative rock band The Horrors and side project Cat's Eyes
- John Cridlan Barrett, recipient of the Victoria Cross "for most conspicuous bravery and devotion to duty" on 24 September 1918
- Tim Barrow, British diplomat
- Simon Cheshire, novelist (as Richard Gadz)
- Alex Grove, Scottish international Rugby Union player
- Christian Horner, Principal of the Red Bull Formula One Racing Team and former racing driver
- Denis Matthews, pianist and musicologist
- Daniel Dalton, Cricketer and former MEP
