= Paul Tucker (banker) =

British central banker and author (born 1958)

Sir Paul Tucker

Deputy Governor of the Bank of England for Financial Stability
- In office March 2009 – October 2013
- Governor: Mark Carney (2013); Mervyn King (2003–2013); Sir Edward George (2002–2003)
- Preceded by: John Gieve
- Succeeded by: Jon Cunliffe

Member of the Monetary Policy Committee
- In office June 2002 – October 2013
- Governor: Mark Carney (2013); Mervyn King (2003–2013); Sir Edward George (2002–2003)

Member of the Financial Policy Committee
- In office April 2013 – October 2013
- Governor: Mark Carney (July–October 2013); Mervyn King (April–June 2013)

Personal details
- Born: 24 March 1958 (age 68)
- Education: Trinity College, Cambridge
- Profession: Economist
- Website: paultucker.me

Sir Paul Tucker (born 24 March 1958) is a British central banker and author. He was formerly the Deputy Governor of the Bank of England, with responsibility for financial stability, and served on the Bank's Monetary Policy Committee from June 2002 until October 2013 and its interim and then full Financial Policy Committee from June 2011. In November 2012 he was turned down for the position of governor in favour of Mark Carney. In June 2013, Tucker announced that he would leave the Bank of England, and later that he would be moving to Harvard. He was knighted in the 2014 New Year Honours for services to central banking. His first book, Unelected Power, was published in May 2018 and his second book, Global Discord was published in November 2022.

== Early life ==
Tucker was educated at Codsall High School, Wolverhampton, and graduated from Trinity College, Cambridge, where he studied maths and philosophy.

== Central Banking career ==
Tucker joined the Bank of England in 1980. From 1980 to 1989 Tucker worked in banking supervision; in corporate finance at a merchant bank; on reforming Hong Kong following the 1987 crash, and then the UK's wholesale payments system, leading to the introduction of real-time gross settlement. He was Principal Private Secretary to Robin Leigh-Pemberton, Governor of the Bank of England, for nearly four years until 1993.

Tucker became Head of Gilt-Edged & Money Markets Division in mid-1994, during a period of reforms in the money markets. He was Head of Monetary Assessment and Strategy Division 1997–1998, responsible for assessing UK monetary conditions and issues concerning the monetary framework. From January 1999, he was Deputy Director of Financial Stability, and was closely involved with the Bank's Financial Stability Review. From 1997 to 2002, he was also on the Secretariat of the Monetary Policy Committee, preparing the published minutes.

== Appointed Policymaker ==
Starting in June 2002, he became Executive Director for Markets, with responsibility for (i) the Bank's implementation of monetary policy and the management of its balance sheet more generally, including management of UK's foreign currency reserves; and (ii) for market intelligence and analysis supporting the Bank's monetary and financial stability core purposes. At the same time he was appointed a member of the Bank of England's Monetary Policy Committee and Executive Director for Markets from June 2002. While on the monetary committee, he voted in a minority seven times. He has been described as trying to break down silos between different parts of the central banking during this period. That theme had featured in various speeches before the financial crisis focusing on financial innovation, the monetary aggregates, and stability.

He was reported as having pushed for a more active response to the liquidity crisis.

He was appointed as Deputy Governor of the Bank of England with effect from March 2009. In this capacity he was closely involved in framing and implementing the extension of the central bank's formal responsibilities and powers into micro and macro-prudential supervision of the financial system, after the 2008 financial crisis.

A July 2012 memo submitted to the Treasury Select Committee and released by the Wall Street Journal suggested that Tucker may have implicitly pressured Barclays to manipulate its Libor submissions by relaying a message from senior members of the UK government that "it did not always need to be the case that [Barclays] appeared as high as [Barclays] has recently." The memo also noted that Diamond did not believe he received an instruction from Tucker. In August 2012, the Treasury Select Committee noted in its report into Libor that the conclusion of the Financial Services Authority was that "no instruction for Barclays to lower its LIBOR submissions was given during this telephone conversation", but that "as the substance of the telephone conversation was relayed down the chain of command at Barclays, a misunderstanding or miscommunication occurred" so that "Barclays' Submitters believed mistakenly that they were operating under an instruction from the Bank of England". The U.S. Department of Justice and the U.S. Commodity Futures Trading Commission also came to similar conclusions following their investigations.

During this period, Tucker spoke frequently about future risks to stability from shadow banking and clearing houses. While on the Financial Policy Committee, Tucker also argued against the Bank of England being granted powers to intervene in the housing market for its own sake, as that would be highly political, contrasting that with powers that were needed to ensure the resilience of the financial system.

=== International Central Banking ===
While Deputy Governor of the Bank of England, Tucker became a director of the Bank for International Settlements, and later also chaired the Basel-based Committee on Payment and Settlement Systems (CPSS). During this period, he was a member of the Steering Committee of the G20 Financial Stability Board ("FSB").

In 2009 Tucker became the first chair of the FSB's Working Group on Cross-Border Crisis Management. According to the British Bankers Association, Tucker was “one of the first to set out thinking on ways to deepen the resolution regime”, in particular to develop "a super special resolution framework that permitted the authorities, on a rapid timetable, to haircut uninsured creditors in a going concern”. Tucker helped to develop the conceptual architecture of bail-in, and also got the FSB and G-20 behind the proposal. In October 2011, the FSB Working Group published the "Key Attributes of Effective Resolution Regimes for Financial Institutions". This document set out core principles to be adopted by all participating jurisdictions, including the legal and operational capability for such a super special resolution regime (now known as 'bail-in'). In late 2012, Tucker co-authored an op-ed with FDIC Chairman Martin Gruenberg that described how different countries should cooperate on the resolution of a cross-border bank.

== Systemic Risk Council ==
From December 2015, two years after leaving office, until August 2021, Tucker was chair of the Systemic Risk Council, a body set up in 2012 by former regulators and central bankers to promote financial stability. Its first chair was Sheila Bair, former Chair of the FDIC, and its members included Paul Volcker (former Chair of the Federal Reserve) and Jean-Claude Trichet (former President of the European Central Bank). While Tucker was chair, in early 2017 the SRC issued a statement to G20 Finance Ministers and Governors on financial reform which it refreshed in the run up to the November 2020 US Presidential election, highlighting outstanding issues. Amongst other things, the SRC has intervened on various Trump US Treasury proposals to roll back financial regulation, and on the need for a policy on the resolution of clearing houses without taxpayer bailouts. It was critical of various Federal Reserve relaxations on the grounds they left the system less resilent.

Shortly after the 2019 outbreak of the Covid pandemic, the Systemic Risk Council issued a statement addressed to the G20 on how the economic and financial authorities should respond, including credit facilities, and urging suspension of banks’ dividends, share buy backs and top-end bonuses, which the EU but not US followed.

== Continued Involvement in Monetary Issues ==
Tucker has continued to speak and write about monetary policy and financial stability. Shortly after leaving office, he set out views on the program to reform the financial system, at an event held by the Washington D.C. Brookings think tank's Hutchins Center to mark the retirement of Federal Reserve chairman Ben S. Bernanke. He co-authored advice to the International Monetary Fund on how to address countries' external financing and other risks.

Tucker's analysis of the lender of last resort function has been published by the Bank for International Settlements and quoted extensively in a leading US textbook on the law of financial regulation. In late 2020, Tucker published proposals for reforming financial regulation so that all issuers of instruments treated as safe by customers, investors and traders (shadow banks as well as banks) have to carry sufficient assets to cover 100% of their short-term liabilities by borrowing secured at the central bank.

In November 2018, Tucker was elected President of the UK's National Institute of Economic and Social Research.

In February 2021 testimony to a UK House of Lords committee on quantitative easing, Tucker was critical of the way the different purposes of central banks purchasing government bonds had blurred, highlighting that market-maker-of-last resort was important but not regular monetary policy, and expressing concern about the effect of massive QE on the interest rate-sensitivity of government debt-servicing costs.

== Other Post Central Banking Activities ==
Since late 2013, Tucker has been a Fellow at the Harvard Kennedy School's Mossavar-Rahmani Center for Business and Government. He is a Senior Fellow at Harvard's Center for European Studies.

Following the 2016 referendum on European Union membership in the United Kingdom, Tucker co-authored a paper with Jean Pisani-Ferry, André Sapir, Norbert Rottgen and Guntram Wolff which lays out a proposal of a "continental partnership" between the EU and the UK. According to the paper, such a partnership would grant Britain some control over labor mobility while preserving free movement of capital, goods and services

Tucker's first book, Unelected Power: The Quest for Legitimacy in Central Banking and the Regulatory State, was published in May 2018 by Princeton University Press. It has been described as "rang[ing] with great erudition and clear logic across political philosophy, economics and public law to reconstruct from the ground up the case for the legitimate exercise of unelected power in a modern representative democracy." In May 2022, the UK House of Lords Industry and Regulators select committee discussed the implications of the book's thesis for parliamentary scrutiny of regulators in detail, drawing on examples from his own experience. He contrasts the attitude and approach of different nations, particularly the USA and France, and expresses concern that officials become 'overmighty citizens' without effective scrutiny.

His second book, Global Discord: Values and Power in a Fractured World Order, was published in November 2022 by Princeton University Press. In it he advances the argument that western democracies are facing a long term contest with more authoritarian states involving entangling many dimensions of international public policy and security issues. He expounds the principles for what he argues would be a sustainable system of international cooperation between democracies and illiberal states in a way which would not sacrifice the wests political values. His arguments are inspired, he says, by David Hume (not the usual catalogue of Hobbes, Kant, or Grotius).
