= List of ambassadors of the United Kingdom to the European Union =

British Ambassador to the European Union
- Coat of arms of the United Kingdom

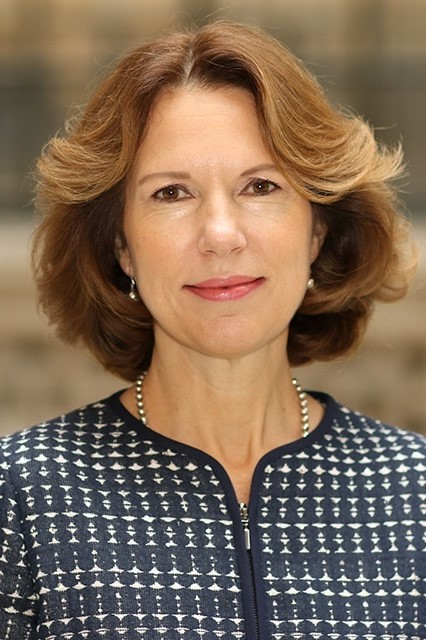
- Incumbent; Caroline Wilson since September 2026
- Foreign, Commonwealth and Development Office; UK Embassy to the EU Brussels
- Style: His Excellency
- Residence: Brussels
- Nominator: The prime minister
- Appointer: King Charles III
- Term length: No fixed term
- Precursor: Permanent representative
- Inaugural holder: Sir Tim Barrow
- Formation: 2020

The British ambassador to the European Union is the United Kingdom's foremost diplomatic representative to the European Union, and head of the United Kingdom Mission to the European Union (UKMis). This role replaced that of permanent representative to the European Union (UKREP) when the United Kingdom left the European Union on 31 January 2020.

The UK Mission to the EU is located in the same building as the British Embassy to Belgium at 10 Avenue d’Auderghem in Brussels.

== List of heads of mission ==
=== Ambassador to the European Union ===
- 2020–2021: Sir Tim Barrow
- 2021–2026: Lindsay Croisdale-Appleby
- 2026–present: Caroline Wilson
