= Kat Williams =

American blues singer

- Born: Katrina Williams
- Died: November 12, 2025
- Genres: Blues music, Jazz music
- Occupations: Blues singer, songwriter
- Years active: 1997–2025

Katrina Williams (February 24, 1967 – November 12, 2025) was an American jazz and blues singer who lived in Asheville, North Carolina. She is best known for appearing on the third season of America's Got Talent

== Early life ==
Williams was born February 24, 1967 in Buffalo, New York. She was a foster child until Mary Williams adopted her. She sang in a Catholic choir but was kicked out for being too enthusiastic. She returned to the foster system at age 17 after her mother's death. She studied criminology in college but did not receive a degree. She worked at Sing Sing and, after moving to Asheville in 1997, at Craggy Correctional Center and the Buncombe County jail. She began her singing career after performing at a karaoke bar.

== Television ==
Williams appeared on the third season of America's Got Talent, where she reached to the Las Vegas rounds. She was eliminated before rounds of the top 40. Williams also appeared on The Tonight Show with Jay Leno.

== Community outreach ==
Kat Williams was program director for the Buncombe County Sheriff's Department. She became involved in the Boys and Girls Club of Henderson County in 2015 and joined its board of directors. In 2018 she performed as part of "A Special Evening with Elizabeth Smart: Where's There Hope, There's Healing," an effort to address sexual violence.

== Awards and nominations ==
The Christian Music Hall of Fame nominated Williams for Urban Performer of the Year in 2009.

Williams received an Emmy Award nomination in 2012 for her work on the Hands of Hope project which featured several famous vocalists.

== Personal life and death ==
Williams was diagnosed with Stage 4 kidney disease in 2016 and received a kidney transplant from a member of her church, Unity of the Blue Ridge in Mills River, North Carolina.

Williams was a lesbian and previously married to an unnamed woman. For these reasons, Williams was reportedly ejected from a Gala for Hope fundraiser by the Catholic Diocese of Charlotte. She then married Patrice Boudreaux on June 30, 2018. She died on November 12, 2025, from cardiac arrest. Her death was unrelated to the kidney disease, according to her wife.
