= Barbara Woodward =

British diplomat (born 1961)

Dame Barbara Woodward GCMG OBE
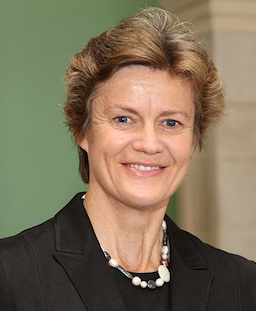
- Woodward in 2014

Permanent Representative of the United Kingdom to the United Nations
- In office 6 August 2020 – 3 October 2025
- Monarchs: Elizabeth II; Charles III
- Prime Minister: Boris Johnson; Liz Truss; Rishi Sunak; Keir Starmer
- Preceded by: Dame Karen Pierce
- Succeeded by: Dame Sarah MacIntosh

British Ambassador to China
- In office 19 February 2015 – 6 August 2020
- Monarch: Elizabeth II
- Prime Minister: David Cameron; Theresa May; Boris Johnson
- Preceded by: Sir Sebastian Wood
- Succeeded by: Dame Caroline Wilson

Personal details
- Born: Barbara Janet Woodward; 29 May 1961 (age 65) Gipping, Suffolk, England
- Education: University of St Andrews; Yale University

Dame Barbara Janet Woodward GCMG OBE (born 29 May 1961) is a British diplomat and China expert. She served as Permanent Representative of the United Kingdom to the United Nations from 2020 to 2025, having previously been the British Ambassador to China from 2015 to 2020, the first woman to hold that position. She currently serves as a Deputy National Security Adviser to the United Kingdom, responsible for international affairs.

== Early years ==
Woodward was born in Gipping, Suffolk, to Arthur Claude Woodward (1921–1992) and Rosemary Monica Gabrielle Fenton (1931−2017). Her father, who served in World War II as an officer of the Suffolk Regiment and won the Military Cross for gallantry, was later elected a Fellow of the Royal Institution of Chartered Surveyors, and her mother taught at Ipswich School.

Woodward was educated at South Lee School in Bury St Edmunds and at Saint Felix School, a co-educational independent boarding school in Southwold. In 1983, she took a MA in history from St Andrews. She taught English, first at Nankai University and then at Hubei University, in Wuhan, China, between 1986 and 1988. She later learned and mastered Chinese. Her teacher in London gave her the Chinese name Wu Baina (吴百纳 Wú Bǎinà). In 1988 she went to Yale University in the United States to further her studies on international relations, and obtained a postgraduate Master of Arts (MA) degree.

== Career ==
Woodward joined the Foreign and Commonwealth Office (FCO) in 1994. She served in Russia from 1994 to 1998 as Second (and later First) Secretary, and in China from 2003 to 2009, first as Political Counsellor, then across the whole United Kingdom-China relationship as Deputy Head of Mission, including during the 2008 Summer Olympics. From 2011 to 2015 she was Director General for Economic and Consular Affairs at the FCO.

In February 2015 she was appointed British Ambassador to China, the first woman to hold the position. She was succeeded in September 2020 by Caroline Wilson. In 2015, in a conversation with Lucy D'Orsi, Queen Elizabeth II said that Xi Jinping's officials "were very rude to the ambassador" (referring to Woodward), during an event at Lancaster House, London.

Woodward faced scrutiny for her reluctance to criticise China during her time in that post, according to an article in The Sunday Times. After a number of MPs were sanctioned by China for their criticism of an alleged genocide against the Uyghurs in Xinjiang province, Woodward was accused of being insufficiently robust in dealing with the issue. After leaving her posting in China, Woodward also told the pro-Beijing Global Times newspaper that Taiwan would never have independence.

Woodward was appointed Permanent Representative of the United Kingdom to the United Nations in 2020 and served in the role until 2025. During her final months of ambassadorship to the UN, she was shortlisted as one of the final two candidates for Chief of the Secret Intelligence Service (MI6), which ultimately saw Blaise Metreweli appointed. She was subsequently appointed Deputy National Security Advisor under Jonathan Powell.

In 2026 Woodward was a candidate in the election for the position of Chancellor of the University of St Andrews, her alma mater, which was won by Dame Anne Pringle.

== Personal life ==
Woodward's hobbies include sports, particularly competitive swimming and tennis. She is a member of the Otter Swimming Club in London and has previously served as its Honorary Secretary.

== Awards ==
Woodward was included in the 1999 New Year Honours list and made an Officer of the Order of the British Empire (OBE) by Queen Elizabeth II when she was serving as the First Secretary to Moscow. In 2011, she was included in the Birthday Honours and made a Companion of the Most Distinguished Order of Saint Michael and Saint George (CMG) for services to UK-China relations. In 2016, she was included in the Birthday Honours and promoted to Dame Commander of the Order of St Michael and St George (DCMG) for services to UK-China relations. In the 2026 New Year Honours, she was further promoted to Dame Grand Cross of the Order of St Michael and St George (GCMG) for services to British foreign policy. She is the first female diplomat to be awarded a GCMG.

== Notes ==
Diplomatic posts
Preceded by Sir Sebastian Wood	British Ambassador to China; 2015–2020	Succeeded by Dame Caroline Wilson
Preceded by Dame Karen Pierce	British Permanent Representative to the United Nations; 2020–2025	Succeeded by TBA
