= Permanent Representative of the United Kingdom to the European Union =

Her Britannic Majesty's Permanent Representative to the European Union
- Coat of Arms of the United Kingdom
- Foreign and Commonwealth Office; UK Representation to the EU Brussels
- Style: His Excellency
- Residence: Brussels
- Nominator: The Prime Minister
- Appointer: Queen Elizabeth II
- Term length: No fixed term
- Inaugural holder: Michael Palliser
- Formation: 1 January 1973
- Final holder: Sir Tim Barrow
- Abolished: 31 January 2020
- Succession: British Ambassador to the European Union

The Permanent Representative of the United Kingdom to the European Union was the United Kingdom's foremost diplomatic representative to the European Union, and head of the United Kingdom Representation to the European Union (UKREP), while the United Kingdom was a member state of the European Union. Their official title was Her Britannic Majesty's Permanent Representative to the European Union. Since the UK left the EU on 31 January 2020, the role was replaced with the British Ambassador to the European Union.

== List of heads of mission ==
=== Permanent representatives to the European Communities ===
- 1973–1975: Sir Michael Palliser
- 1975–1979: Sir Donald Maitland
- 1979–1985: Sir Michael Butler
- 1985–1990: Sir David Hannay
- 1990–1992: Sir John Kerr

=== Permanent representatives to the European Union ===
- 1992–1995: Sir John Kerr
- 1995–2000: Sir Stephen Wall
- 2000–2003: Sir Nigel Sheinwald
- 2003–2007: Sir John Grant
- 2007–2012: Sir Kim Darroch
- 2012–2013: Sir Jon Cunliffe
- 2013–2017: Sir Ivan Rogers
- 2017–2020: Sir Tim Barrow
