= Financial Policy Committee =

Committee of the Bank of England

The Financial Policy Committee (FPC) is an official committee of the Bank of England, modelled on the already well established Monetary Policy Committee. It was announced in 2010 as a new body responsible for monitoring the economy of the United Kingdom. Focusing on the macro-economic and financial issues that may threaten long term growth prospects, it was expected to be officially set out in legislation during 2012. Although early plans were for the interim (pre-legislation) FPC to meet in late 2010, the committee's first meeting was held in June 2011. As of March 2012, the FPC is expected to take over operational responsibility for managing the financial sector from the Financial Services Authority with legislation planned for 2013.

Once operational, the committee, headed by the Governor of the Bank, it will address any risks it identifies by passing on its concerns to a new Prudential Regulation Authority (PRA), which will be obliged to act. Plans for the committee were set out in George Osborne's first Mansion House speech in June 2010, along with the creation of the PRA and a Consumer Protection and Markets Authority (CPMA, later renamed the Financial Conduct Authority, or FCA). Minutes of FPC meetings are made available, a move intended both "to increase transparency and to help transmit messages to the City". After legislation is passed, the FPC will be fully accountable to Parliament.

== See also ==
- Financial Services Authority
