= 1962 New Year Honours =

British royal recognitions

The New Year Honours 1962 were appointments in many of the Commonwealth realms of Queen Elizabeth II to various orders and honours to reward and highlight good works by citizens of those countries. They were announced in supplements to the London Gazette of 29 December 1961 to celebrate the year passed and mark the beginning of 1962.

At this time honours for Australians were awarded both in the United Kingdom honours, on the advice of the premiers of Australian states, and also in a separate Australia honours list.

The recipients of honours are displayed here as they were styled before their new honour, and arranged by honour, with classes (Knight, Knight Grand Cross, etc.) and then divisions (Military, Civil, etc.) as appropriate.

== United Kingdom and Commonwealth ==
=== Baron ===
- Sir (Walter) Russell Brain, Bt, DM, FRCP. For services to Medicine.
- Sir Leonard Percy Lord, KBE. For services to the motor industry.
- Right Honourable Sir Austin Richard William Low, KCMG, CBE, DSO, TD, MP, Member of Parliament for Blackpool North since 1945. Parliamentary Secretary, Ministry of Supply, 1951–1954; Minister of State, Board of Trade, 1954–1957. Deputy Chairman, Conservative Parity Organisation since 1959. For political and public services.
- Sir (George) Leighton Seager, Bt, CBE, JP, Chairman of the National Liberal Organisation. For political and public services.

=== Privy Councillor ===
- Herbert William Bowden, CBE, MP, Member of Parliament for Leicester South, 1945–1950 and for Leicester South-West since 1950. An Assistant Government Whip, 1949–1950; A Lord Commissioner of HM Treasury, 1950–1951; Opposition Deputy Chief Whip, 1951–1955; Opposition Chief Whip since 1955.
- Sir (George) Richard Hodges Nugent, Bt, MP, Member of Parliament for Guidford since 1950. Joint Parliamentary Secretary to Ministry of Agriculture, Fisheries and Food, 1951–1957, and to Ministry of Transport and Civil Aviation, 1957–1959.
- Sir (John) Roland Robinson, MP, Member of Parliament for Widnes, 1931–1935, and for Blackpool, 1935–1945, and Blackpool South since 1945.

=== Baronet ===
- Sir Harry Jephcott, lately chairman, Council for Scientific and Industrial Research.
- Martin Alexander Lindsay, CBE, DSO, MP, Member of Parliament for Solihull since 1945. For political and public services.
- Colonel Jervoise Bolitho Scott, JP, DL. For public services in Hampshire.
- Isaac Wolfson. For philanthropic services.

=== Knight Bachelor ===
- Gilmour Menzies Anderson, CBE. For political services in Scotland.
- Leon Bagrit, chairman, Elliott Brothers (London) Ltd., Lewisham.
- Brigadier John Ashworth Barraclough, CMG, DSO, OBE, MC, chairman, Engineering Employers' Association (Birmingham, Wolverhampton & Stafford District).
- Captain Colin Reith Coote, DSO, Managing Editor, The Daily Telegraph and Morning Post.
- John Greig Dunbar, Lord Provost of Edinburgh.
- Angus Fraser, Solicitor of Inland Revenue.
- Richard Michael Fraser, CBE. For political services.
- Donald Edward Evelyn Gibson, CBE, Director-General of Works, War Office.
- John Anthony Langford-Holt, MP, Member of Parliament for Shrewsbury since 1945. For political and public services.
- William Kenneth Hutchison, CBE, deputy chairman, Gas Council.
- James Robert Lumsden, CBE, DL. For political and public services in Dunbartonshire.
- Malcolm McDougall, chairman, J. & P. Coats, Batons & Baldwins Ltd.
- William MacTaggart, President of the Royal Scottish Academy.
- Robert Hogg Matthew, CBE, Professor of Architecture, University of Edinburgh.
- Laurence James Menzies, Secretary, Export Credits Guarantee Department.
- Nevill Francis Mott, Cavendish Professor of Experimental Physics, and Master of Gonville and Caius College, University of Cambridge.
- John William Nicholson, MM, MB, ChB, Senior Resident Surgeon, Manor House Hospital, Golders Green.
- Alderman Frederick Ernest Oliver, CBE, TD, DL. For political and public services in Leicester.
- Leslie Walter Phillips, CBE, chairman, T. J. Jones & Co. Ltd., London, Grain Brokers.
- Charles Herbert Pollard, CBE, lately City Treasurer, Kingston-upon-Hull.
- Joseph Rawlinson, CBE, Chief Engineer and County Surveyor, London County Council.
- Edward Lionel Russell, CBE, Chief Education Officer, Birmingham.
- Colonel Richard Home Studholme, OBE, lately Sheriff, City of London.
- George Taylor, Director, Royal Botanic Gardens, Kew.
- Luke William Burke Teeling, MP, Member of Parliament for Brighton, 1944–1950, and for the Pavilion Division of Brighton since 1950. For political and public services.
- Lieutenant-Colonel Richard Bertram Verdin, OBE, TD, JP, DL, lately President, Country Landowners' Association.
- Professor Graham Selby Wilson, MD, FRCP, Director, Public Health Laboratory Service.
- Roy Mickel Wilson, QC, President of the Industrial Court.

State of Victoria

- Bernard Evans, DSO, ED, a member of the Melbourne City Council; Lord Mayor of the City of Melbourne, 1959–1961, State of Victoria.
- Kenneth George Luke, CMG. For public services in the State of Victoria.

State of South Australia

- Honourable Dudley Bruce Ross, a Judge of the Supreme Court in the State of South Australia.

State of Western Australia

- William Frederick Samson, Mayor of the City of Fremantle, State of Western Australia.

Commonwealth Relations

- Edward Penderel Moon, OBE, Indian Civil Service (Retired), formerly Adviser (Planning), Planning Commission, Government of India.
- Orby Howell Mootham, Indian Civil Service (Retired), formerly Chief Justice of the State of Uttar Pradesh, India.

Overseas Territories

- Diarmaid William Conroy, CMG, OBE, TD, Chief Justice, Northern Rhodesia.
- Learie Nicholas Constantine, MBE, Minister of Works and Transport, Trinidad.
- John Osbaldiston Field, CMG, Her Majesty's Overseas Civil Service, lately Commissioner, Southern Cameroons.
- Hubert James Marlowe Flaxman, CMG, Chief Justice, Gibraltar.
- Garnet Hamilton Gordon, CBE, QC, Commissioner in the United Kingdom for West Indies, British Guiana and British Honduras.
- John Stanley Mordecai, CMG, Deputy Governor-General, Federation of West Indies.
- Lindsay Tasman Ride, CBE, ED, Vice-Chancellor, Hong Kong University.

Tanganyika

- John Fletcher-Cooke, CMG, lately Deputy Governor, Tanganyika.

=== Order of the Bath ===
==== Knight Grand Cross of the Order of the Bath (GCB) ====
Military Division

- General Sir Horatius Murray, KBE, CB, DSO, (27245), Colonel, Cameronians (Scottish Rifles) (now retired).
- Air Marshal Sir Charles Elworthy, KCB, CBE, DSO, MVO, DFC, AFC, Royal Air Force.

Civil Division

- Sir Alexander Johnston, KBE, CB, chairman, Board of Inland Revenue.

==== Knight Commander of the Order of the Bath (KCB) ====
Military Division

Royal Navy

- Vice-Admiral Varyl Cargill Begg, CB, DSO, DSC.
- Vice-Admiral Charles Leo Glandore Evans, CB, CBE, DSO, DSC.

Army

- Lieutenant-General Robert Napier Hubert Campbell Bray, CB, CBE, DSO, (39414), late Infantry.
- Lieutenant-General Charles Leslie Richardson, CB, CBE, DSO, (40407), late Corps of Royal Engineers.

Royal Air Force

- Acting Air Marshal Douglas Griffith Morris, CB, CBE, DSO, DFC.
- Acting Air Marshal George Augustus Walker, CB, CBE, DSO, DFC, AFC.

Civil Division

- Henry Hardman, CB, Permanent Secretary, Ministry of Aviation.

==== Companion of the Order of the Bath (CB) ====
Military Division

Royal Navy

- Venerable Archdeacon John Armstrong, OBE, QHC, Chaplain of the Fleet.
- Rear-Admiral Walter William Hector Ash.
- Rear-Admiral George Ian Mackintosh Balfour, DSC.
- Surgeon Rear-Admiral William Vincent Beach, OBE, QHS, FRCS.
- Rear-Admiral Antony Bartholomew Cole, DSC.
- Rear-Admiral Alexander Henry Charles Gordon-Lennox, DSO.
- Rear-Admiral George David Archibald Gregory, DSO.
- Rear-Admiral Desmond John Hoare.
- Surgeon Rear-Admiral (D) William Holgate, OBE, QHDS, LDS.
- Rear-Admiral Frank Roddam Twiss, DSC.

Army

- Major-General Richard Hugh Barry, CBE, (41073), late Infantry.
- Major-General Adam Johnstone Cheyne Block, CBE, DSO, (39141), late Royal Regiment of Artillery.
- Major-General George Sinclair Cole, CBE, (52577), late Royal Regiment of Artillery.
- Major-General William Robert Macfarlane Drew, CBE, QHP, MB, FRCP, (52405), late Royal Army Medical Corps.
- Major-General Gerald William Duke, CBE, DSO, (52586), late Corps of Royal Engineers, Colonel Commandant Military Provost Staff Corps.
- Major-General Ian Cecil Harris, CBE, DSO, (47584), late Infantry.
- Major-General Alan Jolly, CBE, DSO, (49887), late Royal Armoured Corps.
- Major-General Edward Alexander Wilmot Williams, CBE, MC, (47677), late Infantry.

Royal Air Force

- Air Vice-Marshal Sidney Richard Carlyle Nelson, OBE, QHP, MD, MCPS.
- Air Vice-Marshal Thomas Alford Boyd Parselle, CBE.
- Air Vice-Marshal Maxwell Edmund Massy Perkins, CBE.
- Air Vice-Marshal Henry Bertram Wrigley, CBE.
- Acting Air Vice-Marshal Charles Stuart Moore, OBE.
- Air Commodore Gareth Thomas Butler Clayton, DFC.
- Air Commodore William Innes Cosmo Inness, OBE.

Civil Division

- Goronwy Hopkin Daniel, Under-Secretary, Ministry of Power.
- Handel Davies, deputy director (Air), Royal Aircraft Establishment, Ministry of Aviation.
- Richard Fredrick Roberts Dunbar, OBE, Permanent Secretary, Ministry of Finance for Northern Ireland.
- Lancelot Errington, Under-Secretary, Ministry of Pensions and National Insurance.
- John Hinshelwood Gibson, QC, Legal Secretary and Parliamentary Draftsman, Lord Advocate's Department.
- Francis Laurence Theodore Graham-Harrison, Assistant Under-Secretary of State, Home Office.
- Norman Percival Luscombe, Director of Armament Supply, Admiralty.
- Gerald John MacMahon, CMG, Under-Secretary, Board of Trade.
- Edward Arthur Perren, lately Director, Chemical Defence Experimental Establishment, War Office.
- Michael Reed, Under-Secretary, Ministry of Health.
- David Radford Serpell, CMG, OBE, Deputy Secretary, Ministry of Transport.
- Winston Victor Wastie, OBE, Under-Secretary, Ministry of Works.
- Tobias Rushton Weaver, Under-Secretary, Ministry of Education.
- Robert Andrew Wilson, Principal Keeper of Printed Books, British Museum.

=== Order of Saint Michael and Saint George ===
==== Knight Grand Cross of the Order of St Michael and St George (GCMG) ====
- Sir Robert Brown Black, KCMG, OBE, Governor and Commander-in-Chief, Hong Kong.
- Sir Henry Ashley Clarke, GCVO, KCMG, Her Majesty's Ambassador Extraordinary and Plenipotentiary in Rome.

==== Knight Commander of the Order of St Michael and St George (KCMG) ====
- Brigadier Geoffrey Alex Colin Macnab, CB, CMG, Secretary, Government Hospitality Fund.
- Eric Roll, CB, CMG, Deputy Secretary, Ministry of Agriculture, Fisheries and Food.
- John Morrice Cairns James, CMG, CVO, MBE, British High Commissioner in Pakistan.
- Neil Pritchard, CMG, British High Commissioner in Tanganyika.
- Major-General Sir Julian Alvery Gascoigne, KCVO, CB, DSO, Governor and Commander-in-Chief, Bermuda.
- Clive Loehnis, CMG, Director, Government Communications Headquarters.
- Dermot Francis MacDermot, CMG, CBE, Her Majesty's Ambassador Extraordinary and Plenipotentiary in Bangkok.
- Francis Ralph Hay Murray, CB, CMG, Her Majesty's Ambassador Extraordinary and Plenipotentiary (designate) in Athens.
- Ian Dixon Scott, CMG, CIE, Her Majesty's Ambassador Extraordinary and Plenipotentiary (designate) in Khartoum.

==== Companion of the Order of St Michael and St George (CMG) ====
- Albert Reginald Ashford, Assistant Secretary, Board of Customs and Excise.
- William Stanley Hindson, managing director, Indian Steelworks Construction Co. Ltd.
- Geoffrey Masterman Wilson, lately Under-secretary, HM Treasury.
- Alwyn Bowman Barker. For public and municipal services in the State of South Australia.
- Clyde Edwin Clements, OBE. For public services in the State of Victoria.
- Percy Gordon Deedes, OBE, Chairman of the Natural Resources Board, Southern Rhodesia.
- John Baines Johnston, British High Commissioner in Sierra Leone.
- Bruce Shearer. For public services in the State of Queensland.
- George Arthur Brown, Director, Central Planning Unit, Government of Jamaica.
- John Henry Butter, MBE, Permanent Secretary to the Treasury, Kenya.
- Harvey Lloyd Da Costa, QC, Federal Attorney-General, West Indies.
- Barry Owen Barton Gidden, Assistant Secretary, Colonial Office.
- Bryan Audley St. John Hepburn, Financial Secretary, Sarawak.
- Thomas Neil, TD, Permanent Secretary, Office of the Chief Secretary, Kenya.
- Thomas Oates, OBE, Financial Secretary, Aden.
- Richard Evelyn Stone, Resident, Buganda.
- Christopher Swabey, formerly Forestry Adviser to the Secretary of State for the Colonies, now with the Department of Technical Co-operation.
- Frederick Maginley Thomas, Minister of Native Affairs, Northern Rhodesia.
- Alexander Mair Wilkie, Financial Secretary, Western Pacific High Commission.
- Colin de Neufville Hill, OBE, Permanent Secretary to the Treasury, Tanganyika.
- Arthur Brian Hodgson, Principal Secretary (Establishments), Office of the Prime Minister, Tanganyika.
- John Bertram Adams, lately Director-General, European Organization for Nuclear Research.
- Bernard John Garnett, OBE, Counsellor (Commercial) and Consul-General, Her Majesty's Embassy, Athens.
- Reginald Michael Hadow, Counsellor, Her Majesty's Embassy, Paris.
- Norman Gilbert Mott, Foreign Office.
- Raymond Gordon Antony Etherington-Smith, Counsellor, Office of the United Kingdom Commissioner-General for South-East Asia, Singapore.
- Peter Scott Stephens, Counsellor (Commercial), Her Majesty's Embassy, Madrid.
- Charles Cosmo Bruce Stewart, lately Counsellor and Consul-General, Her Majesty's Embassy, Saigon.
- Major-General Vivian Wakefield Street, CBE, DSO, MC, lately Military Adviser and Senior British Officer in Jordan.

=== Royal Victorian Order ===
==== Dame Commander of the Royal Victorian Order (DCVO) ====
- Right Honourable Katherine Isobel, Countess of Scarbrough.

==== Knight Commander of the Royal Victorian Order (KCVO) ====
- Lieutenant-Colonel Martin John Gilliat, CVO, MBE.
- George Proctor Middleton, CVO, MB, ChB.
- Major Mark Vane Milbank, CVO, MC.
- Sir Arthur Wendell Snelling, KCMG.

==== Commander of the Royal Victorian Order (CVO) ====
- Arthur James Robert Collins.
- Allen John Bridson Goldsmith, FRCS, LRCP.
- Captain Andrew Colin Paul Johnstone, OBE, British Overseas Airways Corporation.
- Muriel Mure.

==== Member of the Royal Victorian Order (MVO) ====
At this time the two lowest classes of the Royal Victorian Order were "Member (fourth class)" and "Member (fifth class)", both with post-nominal letters MVO. "Member (fourth class)" was renamed "Lieutenant" (LVO) from the 1985 New Year Honours onwards.

Fourth Class

- John Charlton.
- John William Paulin Dundas.
- Squadron Leader Kenneth James Ernest Hannah, Royal Air Force.
- Reverend Prebendary Herbert Harris.
- Group Captain Richard Gordon Wakeford, OBE, AFC, Royal Air Force.

Fifth Class

- Ethel Strachan Colquhoun, MBE.
- Superintendent Alfred East, Berkshire Constabulary.
- Barbara Evans, MBE.
- Wallace George Leaper.
- Captain Kenneth Alexander McLean, MBE, Royal Marines.
- George Herbert Watson.

=== Order of the British Empire ===
==== Knight Grand Cross of the Order of the British Empire (GBE) ====
Civil Division

- Sir Hector James Wright Hetherington, KBE, DL, lately Principal and Vice-Chancellor, University of Glasgow.
- Sir Kenneth William Blackburne, KCMG, OBE, Captain-General and Governor-in-Chief, Jamaica.

==== Dame Commander of the Order of the British Empire (DBE) ====
Civil Division

- Marie Rambert, CBE, (Mrs. Ashley Dukes). For services to Ballet.

==== Knight Commander of the Order of the British Empire (KBE) ====
Military Division

Royal Navy

- Vice-Admiral Robert Alastair Ewing, CB, DSC.
- Vice-Admiral Reginald Thomas Sandars, CB.

Army

- Major-General Kilner Rupert Brazier-Creagh, CB, CBE, DSO, (44007), late Royal Regiment of Artillery (now retired).
- Lieutenant-General Edward Dacre Howard-Vyse, CB, CBE, MC, (33342), late Royal Regiment of Artillery.

Royal Air Force

- Air Vice-Marshal Edgar Noel Lowe, CB, CBE.
- Air Vice-Marshal Walter Philip George Pretty, CB, CBE.

Civil Division

- Colonel Sir Ambrose Keevil, CBE, MC, DL. For political and public services in the South East of England.
- Sir Norman Victor Kipping, Director General, Federation of British Industries.
- Henry Thompson Smith, CB, Deputy Under-Secretary of State, Air Ministry.
- Cyril Henry Haines, CBE, lately Judge of the Chief Court for the Persian Gulf.
- Leslie Pott, CBE, lately Her Majesty's, Consul-General, Marseilles.
- Arthur Harry Tandy, CBE, Head of the United Kingdom Delegation to the European Communities.
- Most Reverend Reginald Charles Halse, Archbishop of Brisbane, State of Queensland.
- Michael Blundell, MBE, Minister for Agriculture, Animal Husbandry and Water Resources, Kenya.
- His Highness Edward Frederick William Mukabya Mutesa, the Kabaka of Buganda.
- Dennis Charles White, CMG, OBE, High Commissioner, Brunei.

==== Commander of the Order of the British Empire (CBE) ====
Military Division

Royal Navy

- Surgeon Captain Frank William Baskerville, LMSSA.
- Captain Robert Denys Franks, DSO, OBE, DSC, (Retired).
- Captain Robert William Mayo.
- Captain Frederick Leslie Millns, DSC.
- Reverend Hugh James Nicol Purves, OBE, QHC, MA, Chaplain.
- Captain Hereward White, DSC.
- Captain George Geoffrey Wilson, ADC, (Retired).

Army

- Colonel Geoffrey Michael Addison, MBE, (56586), late Royal Regiment of Artillery.
- Brigadier John Blackwood Ashworth, DSO, (47519), late Infantry.
- Brigadier Peter Holmes Walter Brind, DSO, OBE, (50942), late Infantry.
- Brigadier (temporary) Derek Gordon Thomond Horsford, DSO, MBE, (380035), late Infantry.
- Brigadier (temporary) the Honourable Michael Fitzalan-Howard, MVO, MBE, MC, (71887), late Foot Guards.
- Brigadier Brian Kingzett, MC, (44911), late Royal Regiment of Artillery.
- Brigadier Arthur Gordon Poynter Leahy, OBE, (40397), late Corps of Royal Engineers (now retired).
- Brigadier Patrick Holberton Man, DSO, OBE, MC, (58144), late Infantry.
- Brigadier (temporary) James Charles Murphy (135793), Royal Army Ordnance Corps.
- Colonel Frederick Herbert Margetson Rushmore, OBE, (69748), late Royal Regiment of Artillery.
- Colonel Charles Lorne Sayers (62615), late Infantry.
- Brigadier (temporary) John Bramley Malet Sloane, OBE, (137940), late Infantry.
- Brigadier John Chisholm Winchester, MC, (50841), late Corps of Royal Engineers.
- Colonel (local Brigadier) Colin John Russell Yeo, MC, (64509), late Royal Regiment of Artillery.
- Colonel Reginald John Wilkinson, MBE, TD, (66275), late Royal Army Service Corps; on loan to the Government of the Federation of Malaya.

Royal Air Force

- Air Commodore Thomas Edmond John Fitton.
- Air Commodore Harold Keggin, QHDS, LDS.
- Group Captain Cecil Anderson Alldis, DFC, AFC.
- Group Captain Kenneth Stewart Batchelor, DFC.
- Group Captain Robert Clears Fordham, OBE.
- Group Capitan Frederick Desmond Hughes, DSO, DFC, AFC.
- Group Captain James William McCombie, OBE.
- Group Captain Harold Arthur Sudbury.
- Group Captain Harold Arthur Cooper Bird-Wilson, DSO, DFC, AFC.
- Group Captain Richard Olyffe Yerbury, MB, BS (Lond.)

Civil Division

- Duncan Black Abercromby, Commodore Chief Engineer, SS Windsor Castle, British & Commonwealth Shipping Co. Ltd., London.
- Right Honourable Eric William Edward, Baron Ailwyn, JP, DL, A Deputy Speaker and a Deputy Chairman of Committees, House of Lords.
- George Oswald Browning Allen. For services to Cricket.
- John Morrison Barnes, MB, Director, Toxicology Research Unit, Medical Research Council.
- Henry Barrell, Superintendent, Standards Division, National Physical Laboratory, Department of Scientific and Industrial Research.
- Donovan Allaway Barron, Deputy Engineer-in-Chief, General Post Office.
- John Foster Beaver, OBE, JP. For services to industrial training in Bradford and district.
- Captain Honourable Charles Brodrick Amyas Bernard. For political and public services in Suffolk.
- Eliza Bird, MBE. For political services in the North of England.
- Harry Birtles, Principal Executive Officer, Board of Trade.
- Right Honourable Glyn Keith Murray, Baron Blackford, DSO, JP, A Deputy Speaker and a Deputy Chairman of Committees, House of Lords.
- Hector Philip Bond, Assistant Secretary, Ministry of Labour.
- Christopher Tatham Brunner, Director, Shell-Mex and BP., Ltd.
- John Outhit Harold Burrough, AI Officer, Government Communications Headquarters, Foreign Office.
- Henry William Keith Calder, Chief Commoner of the City of London.
- Digby Chamberlain, FRCS, ChM, Professor of Clinical Surgery, Leeds.
- Arthur Desborough Chesterfield, Chief General Manager, Westminster Bank Ltd. For services to the National Savings Committee.
- Edward Wilfrid Davies, General Manager of the Press Association.
- Norman Robert Culmore Dockeray, lately Assistant Secretary, Ministry of Agriculture, Fisheries and Food.
- John Dunlop, OBE, chairman, Scottish Health Services Council.
- Eric Eastwood, Director of Research, Marconi's Wireless Telegraph Company Ltd., Chelmsford, Essex.
- Robert Meredydd Wynne-Edwards, DSO, OBE, MC, chairman, Building Research Board and Road Research Board, Department of Scientific and Industrial Research.
- Myles Landseer Formby, TD, MB, BS, Honorary Consultant in Otorhinolaryngology to the War Office.
- Major (Honorary Colonel) Charles Ian Fraser, TD, DL, lately chairman, Territorial and Auxiliary Forces Association of the County of Inverness.
- Helen Louise Gardner, Reader in Renaissance English Literature, University of Oxford.
- Thomas Lyddon Gardner, chairman and managing director, Yardley & Co. Ltd.
- Frederick Gent. For political and public services in Devon.
- John Charles Glover, OBE, lately Adviser to the Ministry of Agriculture, Fisheries and Food on Oils and Fats.
- Norman Walter Goodchild, OBE, Chief Constable, Wolverhampton Borough Police.
- Hugh Hanchard Goodwin, MBE, General Manager, Herring Industry Board.
- William Edward Bertram Griffiths, OBE, Director of Aviation Safety, Ministry of Aviation.
- Captain Edward Hale, Royal Navy (Retired), Chief Secretary, Royal Life Saving Society.
- Kingsley Montague Hancock, lately Assistant Secretary, Scottish Home Department.
- Leonard Cecil Hawkins, Member, London Transport Executive.
- Bertie Hazell, MBE, JP, chairman, East and West Ridings Regional Board for Industry.
- Wing Commander John Sydney Higginson, OBE, chairman, Northern Ireland Youth Committee.
- Alec Hobson, MVO, OBE. For services as Secretary, Royal Agricultural Society of England.
- Percy Holland, chairman, Walmsley (Bury) Group Ltd.
- Annie Myfanwy Howell, JP, Member, National Insurance Advisory Committee.
- John Vernon Hudson, Superintending Examiner, Board of Trade.
- Walter Richard Austen Hudson, Member of Parliament for Kingston-upon-Hull North, 1950–1959. For political and public services.
- William Hutton, deputy chairman, South of Scotland Electricity Board.
- William George John, deputy director, Naval Construction Division, Ship Department, Admiralty.
- Henry Cecil Johnson, OBE, General Manager, Eastern Region, British Railways.
- Arthur Key, Senior Chemical Inspector, Ministry of Housing and Local Government.
- Bernard Howe Leach, Founder and Director, Leach Pottery, Cornwall.
- Henry Hudson Leeman, lately Principal Executive Officer, Ministry of Pensions and National Insurance.
- James Lenaghan, managing director, Fairfield Shipbuilding & Engineering Co. Ltd., Glasgow.
- Ralph Pateman Lineham, Assistant Chief Valuer, Board of Inland Revenue.
- Sidney Walter Douglas Lockwood, OBE, managing director, Sir W. G. Armstrong Whitworth Aircraft Ltd.
- Lieutenant-Colonel Joshua Geoffrey Barber-Lomax, TD, JP. For political and public services in Lancashire.
- Cyril Grant Maby. For political services.
- Jack Matson, managing director, Monotype Corporation Ltd.
- Gwynne Meara, Director, Central Office of Information.
- Andrew Meldrum, OBE, Chief Constable, Fife Constabulary.
- James Henry Mills, Member, Executive Council of the Amalgamated Society of Woodworkers and President of the National Federation of Building Trade Operatives.
- James Henry Francis Monahan, Controller, European Services, British Broadcasting Corporation.
- Frank Morris, JP. For political services in Bolton.
- Arthur Lloyd Owen Owen, TD, Alderman, Montgomeryshire County Council.
- Robert Davies Owen, FRCS, LRCP, Ear, Nose and Throat Surgeon, Cardiff.
- Lieutenant-Colonel James Herbert Porter, DSO, Member, State Management Districts Council.
- Frederick Richard Poskitt, Headmaster, Bolton School.
- Lieutenant-Colonel Leonard Frank Poultney, TD, JP. For political services in Richmond and Barnes.
- Henry Alfred Price, MP, Member of Parliament for Lewisham West since 1950. For political and public services.
- John Michael Pritchard, Conductor and musical director, Royal Liverpool Philharmonic Orchestra.
- Leslie Penrhys Pugh, Professor of Veterinary Clinical Studies, University of Cambridge.
- Sidney Robert Raffety, Senior Partner, Rofe & Raffety, Consulting Engineers.
- William Reid, chairman, Durham Division, National Coal Board.
- James Edwin Rennie, chairman, Potato Marketing Board for Great Britain.
- John Eric Richardson, Director of Education, Polytechnic, Regent Street, London.
- Thomas Ritchie, MB, ChB, Principal Medical Officer, Ministry of Health.
- Herbert James Liddle Robbie, Headmaster, Daniel Stewart's College, Edinburgh.
- William Francis Roper, MB, BS, lately Principal Medical Officer, HM Prison Wakefield.
- Francis Lionel Rose, JP, Alderman, Halesowen Borough Council, Birmingham.
- Most Noble Charles John Robert, Duke of Rutland, JP, DL. For political and public services in the East Midlands.
- William Douglas Simpson, OBE, chairman, Ancient Monuments Board for Scotland.
- Eric Shirley Snelling, OBE, HM Divisional Inspector, Ministry of Education.
- Professor Frederick William Spiers, Senior Regional Scientific Adviser for Civil Defence, North Eastern Region.
- Alexander Boyd Stewart, Director, Macaulay Institute for Soil Research, Aberdeen.
- John Stone Tamblin, OBE, Director of Army Contracts, War Office.
- Herbert James Thom, CIE, MC, Chairman of Traffic Commissioners and Licensing Authority, South Eastern Traffic Area, Ministry of Transport.
- Frank Ian Tuckwell, Chief Personnel Officer, Dunlop Rubber Company Ltd.
- Alderman Dyas Cyril Loftus Usher, JP. For political and public services in Heston and Isleworth.
- David Wyamar Vaughan. For services to the Church in Wales.
- Sidney Walter Warran, Assistant Secretary, Air Ministry.
- William James Percival Webber, General Secretary, Transport Salaried Staffs' Association.
- Major William Norman Wells. For political and public services in Ripon.
- Brian Dutton Whiteaker, lately Editor of the Wolverhampton Express and Star.
- John Lewis Womersley, City Architect, Sheffield.

- Edward Anthony Fulcher Ashton, OBE, British subject resident in Bolivia.
- Andrew Toon Crighton, OBE, British subject resident in the Netherlands.
- Richard Harries Davies, British subject resident in the United States of America.
- Joyce Ada Cooke Gutteridge, Legal Counsellor, United Kingdom Mission to the United Nations, New York.
- Colonel Arthur Neville Hancock, OBE, British subject resident in Italy.
- William Scott Layer, Counsellor (Commercial), Her Majesty's Embassy, Oslo.
- Alfred Cedric Maby, Her Majesty's Deputy Consul-General, New York.
- John Otto May, OBE, Her Majesty's Consul-General, Genoa.
- Brigadier Charles Francis Carlisle Spedding, Scientific Attaché, Her Majesty's Embassy, Bonn.
- Cyril George Akhurst, formerly deputy director of the Rubber Research Institute of Malaya.
- Douglas James Bell, Resident Director of the Indian Steelworks Construction Co. Ltd., at the Durgapur Steelworks, India.
- James Richard Henry Burns, Chief Police Officer, Perak, Malaya.
- Robert Turnbull Cochran, President, United Kingdom Association of Pakistan.
- Colin John Delaney, CVO, Commissioner of Police, State of New South Wales.
- Frederick Ernest Islip, Clerk of the Legislative Assembly, State of Western Australia.
- Sydney Vernon Lawrenson, OBE, Government Secretary, Bechuanaland Protectorate.
- John Circuitt Lucas, Director and Manager of Elder Dempster Agencies Ltd. in Ghana.
- Robert Miller Macintyre. For services to the British community in Ceylon.
- Hugh Munro Macleod Mackenzie, MBE, chairman, Public Services Board, Southern Rhodesia.
- Harold Cecil Charles Marshall, General Manager of the Bank of New South Wales.
- Roderick William Miller. For services to Industry in the State of New South Wales.
- William Hogarth Robertson Nimmo. For services to the State of Queensland in the field of engineering.
- Basil Osborne, Lord Mayor of the City of Hobart, State of Tasmania.
- Bert Edward Bernard Schumacher, formerly Public Service Commissioner, State of South Australia.
- Henry John Shailes, MBE, chairman and General Manager, Penang Port Commission, Penang, Malaya.
- Maurice Shmith. For public services in the State of Victoria.
- Oliver Bosshardt Bennett, OBE. For public services in Northern Rhodesia.
- Frederick Bishop, Commissioner of Customs and Excise, East African Common Services Organisation.
- Harold Capel Cahusac. For public services in Jamaica.
- Claude Algernon Collard, MBE, Commissioner for Labour, Nyasaland.
- Horace John Croot, FRCS, LRCP, Senior Specialist, Uganda.
- William West Davidson, OBE, Colonial Treasurer, Bermuda.
- Edgar Mortimer Duke, Speaker, Legislative Council, Trinidad and Tobago.
- Arthur James Dunkerley, OBE. For public services in Malta.
- Dennis Mitchell Hedges, Chief Secretary, British Guiana.
- David Ronald Holmes, MBE, MC, ED, District Commissioner, New Territories, Hong Kong.
- Gordon Patrick George Mackay, General Manager, East African Railways and Harbours.
- Right Reverend Michael Moloney, Roman Catholic Bishop of Bathurst, Gambia.
- James Niblock, lately chairman, Barbados Tourist Board.
- Joseph Georges Espitalier-Noel. For public services in Mauritius.
- Gordon Arthur Ransome, FRCP, MRCS, Professor of Medicine, University of Malaya in Singapore.
- Martin Samuel Staveley, MBE, Secretary to the Governor-General, West Indies.
- Ernest Russell Storey Wollen, OBE. For public services in Kenya.

==== Officer of the Order of the British Empire (OBE) ====
Military Division

Royal Navy

- Lieutenant-Colonel Ernest Robert Bridges, Royal Marines.
- Lieutenant-Colonel Anthony John Sinclair Crockett, Royal Marines.
- Chief Engineer (now Commodore Chief Engineer) Reginald Rupert Darroch, Royal Fleet Auxiliary Service.
- Commander George Lewis Densham, DSC.
- Lieutenant-Commander John Arundell Holdsworth.
- Commander Henry Ralph Kimber, MBE.
- Reverend Henry Stephen Leonard, Chaplain.
- Captain Frank Otto Stoe Man, Malayan Royal Naval Volunteer Reserve.
- Commander William Ernest Messinger, MBE.
- Commander Peter Frederick George Page.
- Surgeon Commander Rex Philip Phillips, MB, BS.
- Commander Kenneth Arthur William Pilgrim.
- Commander Roland Cecil Selman.
- Commander Michael Louis Woollcombe.
- Commander Philip Evelyn Yonge, DSC.

Army

- Lieutenant-Colonel Michael John D'Arcy Blackman, MC, (71178), Sherwood (Foresters (Nottinghamshire and Derbyshire Regiment).
- Lieutenant-Colonel Chandos Blair, MC, (85689), Queen's Own Highlanders (Seaforth and Camerons) (Employed List 1).
- Lieutenant-Colonel John David Lumsden Boyle, MBE, MC, (95535), Argyll and Sutherland Highlanders (Princess Louise's), Territorial Army.
- Lieutenant-Colonel Kenneth Donald Bright (113790), Royal Highland Fusiliers (Princess Margaret's Own Glasgow and Ayrshire Regiment) (Employed List 1).
- Lieutenant-Colonel (now Colonel) Lewis Hugh Clifford (65719), Devonshire Regiment, Territorial Army (Now T.A.R.O.).
- Lieutenant-Colonel (now Colonel) Lucy Myfanwy Davies (223106), Women's Royal Army Corps.
- Lieutenant-Colonel Richard Arthur Flower, MC, (145497), 3rd Green Jackets, Rifle Brigade (Now R.A.R.O.).
- Lieutenant-Colonel David William Fraser (184424), Grenadier Guards.
- Lieutenant-Colonel Roger Ker-Gibson (64543), Corps of Royal Engineers.
- Lieutenant-Colonel (Quartermaster) Alexander O'Conner Greenwood, MBE, (248020), Scots Guards (now retired).
- Lieutenant-Colonel (acting) Thomas William Gribble, TD, (70875), Combined Cadet Force.
- Lieutenant-Colonel (acting) Kemlo Abbot Cronin Gross, ERD, TD, (62774), Combined Cadet Force.
- Lieutenant-Colonel (Staff Quartermaster) Frederick William Hann (328670), Employed List 2.
- Lieutenant-Colonel John Martin Donald Ward-Harrison, MC, (67390), 10th Royal Hussars (Prince of Wales's Own), Royal Armoured Corps.
- Lieutenant-Colonel Peter Ronald Hoskins, TD, (148332), Royal Corps of Signals, Territorial Army (now T.A.R.O.).
- Lieutenant-Colonel (acting) Robert James Howat, MB, (380725), Royal Army Medical Corps, Territorial Army.
- Lieutenant-Colonel Brian Watson Hughes, MB, (102614), Royal Army Medical Corps.
- Lieutenant-Colonel (Staff Quartermaster) John Jeffrey (133858), Employed List 2 (now retired).
- Major (Brevet Lieutenant-Colonel) Charles Peter Anthony Joynes (112936), Royal Regiment of Artillery.
- Lieutenant-Colonel Francis James Cecil Bowes-Lyon, MC, (74591), Grenadier Guards.
- Lieutenant-Colonel Anthony Derek Swift Mangnall, TD, (89582), Royal Wiltshire Yeomanry (Prince of Wales's Own), Royal Armoured Corps, Territorial Army (now T.A.R.O.).
- Lieutenant-Colonel John Edward Passingham Peirce (74538), Royal Regiment of Artillery (now R.A.R.O.).
- Lieutenant-Colonel Roger Edward Ralli Robinson (64590), Devonshire and Dorset Regiment (Now R.A.R.O.).
- Lieutenant-Colonel Richard George Satterthwaite (378606), 17th/21st Lancers, Royal Armoured Corps.
- Lieutenant-Colonel William Henry Jack Stehr (129049), Royal Army Service Corps.
- Lieutenant-Colonel (temporary) Claude Hugh Morley Toye, MBE, (186806), Royal Regiment of Artillery.
- Lieutenant-Colonel Ronald Alexander Norman-Walker, MBE, MC, (106703), Royal Regiment of Artillery.
- Lieutenant-Colonel George William Wallis, TD, (249552), Corps of Royal Engineers, Territorial Army.
- Lieutenant-Colonel Harold Wray Whitcher, TD, MB, (65389), Royal Army Medical Corps.
- Lieutenant-Colonel John Francis Willcocks, MBE, (77502), Royal Regiment of Artillery.
- Lieutenant-Colonel Basil Reginald Wood, MBE, TD, (85465), Royal Corps of Signals, Territorial Army.
- Lieutenant-Colonel (Quartermaster) Gilbert Charles Cecil Wood (211124), Royal Army Service Corps.
- Lieutenant-Colonel John Young (198301), Corps of Royal Engineers, Army Emergency Reserve.
- Lieutenant-Colonel (now Colonel) David Ralph Horsfield (69078), late Royal Corps of Signals; formerly on loan to the Government of the Federation of Malaya.
- Lieutenant-Colonel (temporary) Richard Stanley MacGregor Laird, MBE, (69125), Prince of Wales's Own Regiment of Yorkshire; on loan to the Government of Ghana.
- Lieutenant-Colonel (temporary) Filmer George Evan Walford, MBE, (100418), Gordon Highlanders; on loan to the Government of Ghana.
- Lieutenant-Colonel Donald Norman Albert Fairweather, MBE, ED, Commandant, British Honduras Volunteer Guard.

Royal Air Force

- Wing Commander (Acting Group Captain) Thomas Malcolm Grahame Bury (48546).
- Wing Commander John Francis Jerome Dewhurst, DFC, AFC, (130872).
- Wing Commander Sheriff Sandal Dobbs (51556).
- Wing Commander David George Evans (164718).
- Wing Commander (Acting Group Captain) Richard Cummins Haine, DFC, (43147).
- Wing Commander Basil Hamilton, DFC, AFC, (153452).
- Wing Commander Percy George Hicks (85365).
- Wing Commander Albert Henry Jane, MBE, (46981).
- Wing Commander Harry King (135292).
- Wing Commander John William James Leggett (150341).
- Wing Commander George Newberry (119809).
- Wing Commander Robert John Sage, AFC, (39342).
- Wing Commander David Charles Saunders, AFC, (125573).
- Reverend Aidan Eyre Sandys White Spunner.
- Wing Commander Clifford Alan Sullings, AFC, (172750).
- Acting Wing Commander Norman Hammond (65901), Royal Air Force Volunteer Reserve (Training Branch).
- Squadron Leader Denis Robert Dudgeon (179708).
- Acting Squadron Leader Michel Forter (113560).

Civil Division

- Clive Edward Millington Adams, General Manager (Sales), British European Airways Corporation.
- Charles Reginald Adlam, MBE, lately chief executive officer, Air Ministry.
- Frederick Denison Campbell Allen. For services to the Church of England.
- Arthur James Amos, Partner in the firm of Kent-Jones & Amos, Analytical and Consulting Chemists.
- Mary Anderson. For political and public services in Roxburgh and Selkirk.
- Alderman Barbara Andrews. For political and public services in Luton.
- Herbert Wellard Archer, Finance Officer National Headquarters, British Red Cross Society.
- Wilfred James Armstead, JP, Alderman, Andover Borough Council, Hampshire.
- Edward Lionel Ashley, Chief Construction Engineer (Works & Buildings), Risley, United Kingdom Atomic Energy Authority.
- Leslie Henry Atwell, chairman and managing director, Lesme Ltd. and President of the Cocoa, Chocolate and Confectionery Alliance.
- James Henry Awbery, lately Senior Principal Scientific Officer, Ministry of Defence.
- Alfred Richard Leslie Aylward, Farmer and Corn Merchant, Alton, Hampshire.
- Francis Harrold Banfield, lately Director of Research, British Food Manufacturing Industries Research Association.
- Frank Bannister. For political services in Rochester and Chatham.
- James Walter Edward Bates, Senior Chief Executive Officer, HM Stationery Office.
- James Bell, managing director, Mullard-Osram Valve Co. Ltd., Hammersmith.
- Joseph Jackson Bell, JP. For political and public services in Carlisle.
- Alderman George Stanley Bellerby, chairman, York Festival Society.
- Frederick John Bentley, chief executive officer, Government Communications Headquarters.
- Joan Maud Hartley Berwick, HM Inspector, Ministry of Education.
- William Percy Bingham, Senior Engineer, Ministry of Works.
- Cecil Harold Blatch. For political services in Finchley.
- Charles Robert Bossom, Senior Chief Executive Officer, Ministry of Works.
- Wilfred Bowles, Director and General Manager, Era Ring Mill Ltd., Rochdale.
- Robert Alston Brockbank, Staff Engineer, Post Office Research Station, Dollis Hill, London.
- James Geoffery Seddon-Brown, chairman, Lancaster Savings Committee.
- Robert Brown, Grade 2 Officer, Ministry of Labour.
- Thomas Edward Brownsdon, JP, Head of Regional Services, Independent Television Authority.
- Edward Spence Calvert, Senior Principal Scientific Officer, Royail Aircraft Establishment, Ministry of Aviation.
- William Hooton Carlile, chairman, Doncaster Local Employment Committee.
- Reverend Ian Carmichael, DSO, MC, chairman, Argyll and Bute Advisory Committee, National Assistance Board.
- Charles Francis Catt, Senior Chief Executive Officer, Export Credits Guarantee Department.
- Robert McClelland Cavaye. For political services in Edinburgh.
- Harold William Clarke, MBE, Senior Chief Executive Officer, Board of Trade.
- Alfred Alexander Collins, JP, chairman, Scottish Veterans' Garden City Association.
- Herbert Charles Clive Collis, MC, chairman, Stoke-on-Trent War Pensions Committee.
- Arthur Manser Daniels, Principal District Officer, Marine Survey (East of England District), Ministry of Transport.
- Evan William Davies, Regional Controller, Midland Region, National Assistance Board.
- Idris Lewis Davies, MBE, United Kingdom Trade Commissioner for Alberta and North West Territories, Board of Trade.
- Thomas Maelgwyn Davies, Registrar, University College of Wales, Aberystwyth.
- Stanley Sidney Dawes, President Emeritus, Institute of the Motor Industry. (Died 17 December 1961.)
- Frederick Maddick Dawson, Clerk, Billingham Urban District Council, County Durham.
- John Maurice Benjamin Donaldson, MB, BCh, chairman, Northern Ireland Building Fund Appeal Executive Committee, National Society for the Prevention of Cruelty to Children.
- Lieutenant-Colonel Hugh Robert Swanston Duncan, MBE, chairman, Salisbury, Trowbridge and District War Pensions Committee.
- Godfrey Henry Stebbing Du Pontet, TD, Principal, Ministry of Power.
- Alderman Arthur Thomas Edmonds. For public services in Winchester.
- Harold Johanri Thomas Ellingham, Secretary and Registrar, Royal Institute of Chemistry.
- Donald McKay Elliot, Director, Scottish Film Council.
- Stanley Arthur Wesley Evans, MBE, chief executive officer, Air Ministry.
- Edward Victor Eves, Grade 1 Officer, Ministry of Labour.
- Ronald William Payers, chief executive officer, Board of Customs and Excise.
- John Stewart Fifield, DFC, AFC, Chief Test Pilot, Martin Baker Aircraft Co. Ltd., Denham.
- Henry Rowland Fisher, Head of Long Term Studies, Iron and Steel Board.
- Peter Aloysius Fitzpatrick. For services to agriculture in Northern Ireland.
- Eric Richard Leman Fitzpayne, General Manager, Glasgow Corporation Transport Department.
- Alfred Stephen Fosh, vice-president, lately President, Motor Agents' Association.
- Stephen Freeman, Alderman, Berkshire County Council.
- Jack Galloway. For political services.
- Joseph Perry Gee, lately chairman, Liverpool Rent Tribunal.
- Robert Gordon Thomson Gildard, Head of Programmes, Scotland, British Broadcasting Corporation.
- Sanderson Henry Briggs Gill, chairman, Wakefield National Insurance Local Tribunal.
- Cyril Cobham Griffith, MC, chairman, Slough Local Savings Committee.
- Major John William Griffith, JP. For political and public services in Denbighshire.
- Robert Emrys Griffith, Director, Urdd Gobaith Cymru (Welsh League of Youth).
- Mumiel Ratohleen Grindrod, Editor of World Today.
- David Gulland Gunn, London Metropolitan Regional Secretary, Young Men's Christian Association.
- Henry Charles Horton Gurney, Professor of Civil and Mechanical Engineering, University College of South Wales and Monmouthshire, Cardiff.
- Anthony Halhead, Divisional Land Commissioner, Ministry of Agriculture, Fisheries and Food.
- Arthur James Codhrane Hamilton, MB, FRCS (Ed.), Senior Consultant Surgeon, Northern Regional Hospital Board.
- James Donald Mackintosh Hardie, JP, Crown Estate Factor in Moray and Banff.
- Thomas Harrison, JP, chairman and managing director, J. & A. Jackson, Ltd., Manchester.
- Reverend Raeburn Simpson Hawkins, chairman, Easingwold Savings Committee, Yorkshire.
- Eric Lindsay Hay, MBE, Assistant Secretary, Commonwealth Agricultural Bureaux.
- Sylvia Laura, Honourable Mrs. Henley, MBE. For services to hospitals.
- Emerson Tennent Rex Herdman. For political services in County Tyrone.
- John Heyes. For political services in Ormskirk.
- William Edward Holton. For political and public services in County Down.
- Marjorie Houghton, MBE, lately Education Officer, General Nursing Council for England and Wales.
- Alderman Benjamin George Howells, Member, Pembrokeshire Education Committee.
- William James Hutchinson, Senior Inspector of Taxes, Board of Inland Revenue.
- John Hutton, Principal Inspector of Taxes, Board of Inland Revenue.
- Ian George Innes, MD, General Practitioner, Hull.
- Fred Robert Jarvis, Senior Civil Engineer, War Office.
- Gilbert Lawrence Martin Jenkins, Senior Planning Officer, Ministry of Housing and Local Government.
- Joseph Alexander Love Johnston, MD, lately Consultant Physician, North-West Hospitals Group, Londonderry.
- Benjamin Jones, Chief Officer, Sheffield Fire Brigade.
- Captain Digby Jones, Master, MV Breconshire, Glen Line Ltd., London.
- Leslie William Jones, MB, MRCS, General Practitioner, Llanfairpwll, Anglesey.
- Thomas Jones, JP, North Wales and Border Counties Regional Secretary, Transport and General Workers' Union.
- (William John) Parry Jones, Singer.
- Harry Kendrick, Chief Engineer, MV Dunkwa, Elder Dempster Lines, Ltd., Liverpool.
- Herbert Kennewell, Director, National Hosiery Manufacturers Federation.
- Roger Charles John Kenrick, Principal, Ministry of Health.
- Colonel George Durant Kersley, TD, MD, FRCP, DL, chairman, Bath Tattoo Committee.
- Wilfred Philip William Kingdon, Headmaster, Coleridge Secondary Modern School for Boys, Cambridge.
- James Kyles, Scientific Training Officer, Scottish Eastern Civil Defence Zone Control.
- Edgar John Larkin, Director of Work Study, British Transport Commission.
- Adam Russell Laurie, managing director, Welch Margetson & Co. Ltd., Londonderry.
- Captain Edward Douglas Wyndham Lawford, DSO, Royal Navy (Retired), managing director, Iago Steam Trawling Company.
- Gilbert Arthur Leonard, chairman, District Committee, East Riding Agricultural Executive Officer.
- John Arnold Lovern, Senior Principal Scientific Officer, Torry Research Station, Department of Scientific and Industrial Research.
- Hugh McClure, Principal Officer, Ministry of Education for Northern Ireland.
- William Gregory Macdonald, Head of Central European Service, British Broadcasting Corporation.
- Malcolm McLellan, Higher Collector, Leeds, Board of Customs and Excise.
- Colonel Colin Sherwin Macleod of Glendale, TD, General Secretary, British Legion, Scotland.
- James Duncan McNicol, MBE, Firemaster, Northern Area Fire Brigade.
- Clifford Breillat Manning, Senior Mechanical and Electrical Engineer, London Airport, Air Ministry.
- Joan Martyn, Governor, HM Borstal, Cardiff.
- Herbert Stewart Matthes, Vice-chairman, East Anglian Regional Hospital Board.
- Jack Matthews, Sales Director, APV Co. Ltd., Dairy Engineers.
- Dudley Arthur Medcalf, Honorary Secretary, Association of Collecting Friendly Societies.
- Patrick William Medd. For political and public services.
- George Meikle, MBE, Chief of Police, Sovereign Base Areas Administraltion, Cyprus.
- Laura Margaret Dorothea Mill, MB, ChB, Medical Commissioner, General Board of Control for Scotland.
- Joseph Rettie Mitchell, JP, chairman, Buchan Meat Producers Ltd., and Buchan Poultry Products & Egg Producers Ltd.
- Warwick Alfred Morgan, chief executive officer, Sovereign Base Areas Administration, Cyprus.
- Thomas Mortimer, Engineer 1, Ministry of Aviation.
- Jane Moulton, Deputy Principal, City of Sheffield Training College.
- George Eric Munro, Principal Executive Officer, War Office.
- John George Tedford Nelson, MBE, lately County Inspector, Royal Ulster Constabulary.
- James William Newing, Senior Chief Executive Officer, Ministry of Pensions and National Insurance.
- Edward Nicholas, chairman, Welsh Regional Committee, National Federation of Music Societies.
- Philip Reuben Noakes, Chief Information Officer "B", Colonial Office.
- John Elsden Odle, managing director, Williamson Manufacturing Co. Ltd.
- John O'Neill, lately chief executive officer, Scottish Education Department.
- Ryrie James Erskine Orr, Managing Editor, Greenock Telegraph.
- Cecil George Henry Oxford, managing director, Aish & Co. Ltd., Electrical Engineers, Poole, Dorset.
- Reginald William Vaughan Palmer, Editor of Forestry.
- George Parfitt, BEM, Chief Constable, Barnsley Borough Police.
- Barbara Hastings Parker, Secretary and Librarian, British School of Archaeology, Baghdad, Iraq.
- Sydney James Paskins, chief executive officer, Ministry of Transport.
- Charles William Phillips, Archaeology Officer, Ordnance Survey Department.
- Roy Pilgrim, Head of Safety Co-ordination, Weapons Group, Atomic Weapons Research Establishment, United Kingdom Atomic Energy Authority.
- Alderman Edwin Pittwood. For public services in Lincolnshire.
- (Emily) Anna Pollak, Singer.
- John Wallace Porter, lately chief executive officer, Ministry of Pensions and National Insurance.
- Sidney Arthur Potter, MBE, Chairman of Committee, Warwickshire and Birmingham Wing, Air Training Corps.
- Rachel Emily Purvis, JP, District Administrator, Eastern District of Scotland, Women's Voluntary Service.
- Francis Edward Ritchie, Member, National Parks Commission.
- Frank Proom Robson, managing director, Armstrong Addison & Co. Ltd., Sunderland.
- Fraser Macintosh Rose, MB, ChB, General Practitioner, Fulwood, Preston.
- Alderman Vincent James Gerald Ross. For services to civil aviation and private flying at Bristol.
- Thomas Victor Rowlands. For political and public services in Wandsworth.
- Colonel Sir Charles Samuel Rowley, Bt, TD, JP, DL, Member, Territorial and Auxiliary Forces' Association for the County of Suffolk.
- Clifford John Sampson, chief executive officer, Ministry of Agriculture, Fisheries and Food.
- Thomas Christopher Secret, Senior Chief Executive Officer, Ministry of Pensions and National Insurance.
- William Boyd Shannon, Engineering Adviser, Design and Construction Department, Central Electricity Generating Board.
- Harold Charles Sharratt, chairman, East Midland Area Council, British Legion.
- James Ernest Shaw, Senior Principal Scientific Officer, Naval Construction Research Establishment, Admiralty.
- Edgar Charles Laurence Sheppard, District Postmaster, Western Central District Office, London.
- Veere George Sherren, Director General, Industrial & Trade Fairs Ltd.
- Jeffrey Shombrot, Senior Civil Engineer, Admiralty.
- George Vernon Sims, Director, Council of British Manufacturers of Petroleum Equipment.
- Harold Arthur Skerrett, Honorary Secretary, Northampton Savings Committee.
- Alexander Stewart Smith, First Class Valuer, Board of Inland Revenue.
- Clifford Horton-Smith, Senior Principal Scientific Officer, Houghton Poultry Research Station, Houghton, Huntingdonshire.
- David Pollock Smith, JP, DL, lately Member, Lanark County Council.
- Herbert Smith, JP. For political and public services in Walsall.
- Philip John Stevens, Superintendent Registrar for the Croydon Registration District.
- Captain Charles William Gordon Stock, lately Commodore Master, SS British Queen, B.P. Tanker Co. Ltd., London.
- Leslie Victor Store, Superintendent, Royal Ordnance Factory, Llanishen, Cardiff, Ministry of Aviation.
- Walter John Tabner, Assistant to the Master of the Court of Protection, Supreme Court of Judicature.
- Frances Mary Graham-Taylor, MBE. For political and public services in Hampshire.
- Owen Charles Terry, Principal Inspector, Board of Customs and Excise.
- Brian Dick Lauder Thomas, Artist in stained glass. For services in the embellishment of the Chapel of the Order of the British Empire in St. Paul's Cathedral.
- Keith Henry Westcott Thomas, Constructor, HM Dockyard, Portsmouth.
- Major Edwin Thompson, deputy chairman, Cumberland Agricultural Executive Committee.
- Andrew Thomson, Principal Inspector of Taxes, Board of Inland Revenue.
- Lionel Lawrence Tolley, Chief Regional Engineer, Midland Region, General Post Office.
- Ralph George Tracey, MBE, Deputy Accountant General, Commonwealth Relations Office.
- Brenda Muriel Howard Tripp, Director, East Europe Department, British Council.
- Theodore Frederic Tucker, General Superintendent, Dr Barnardo's Homes.
- Anthony Thomas Voyce. For services to sport and for public services in Gloucestershire.
- Frederick James Wakelin, lately Regional Representative of the British Council, Lahore. (Now Regional Representative, Amman).
- Alice Martha Walker. For political and public services in Leicestershire.
- Robert Wilson Wallace, Inspector, Grade I, Minister of Agriculture for Northern Ireland.
- Zinaida Waloff, Principal Scientific Officer, Anti-Locust Research Centre.
- Major Francis James Walters, lately chairman, Surrey County Civil Defence Committee.
- Norman Walton, chief executive officer, Foreign Office.
- Lieutenant-Commander Reginald Kitto Waters, Royal Navy (Retired), Senior Chief Executive Officer, Foreign Office.
- William Watt, Deputy Commander, Metropolitan Police.
- Austin George Webb. For political and public services in Finsbury and Hertfordshire.
- William Edward Webb, JP, chairman, Hounslow and Staines Local Employment Committee.
- Gordon Ewart Thomas Whiting, Grade 2 Officer, Ministry of Labour.
- John Pearce Wilson, Clerk to the Sunderland Borough Justices.
- Ian Cyril Alexander, lately Her Majesty's Consul, Stanleyville.
- Charles Wilfred Arning, MBE, Her Majesty's Consul, St. Paul-Minneapolis.
- Raymond Meredith Beavan, lately British Council Representative, Norway.
- Edward Howard Eustace Bourchier, British subject resident in Mexico.
- Reverend Harold John Casebow, Field Secretary for the Congo, Baptist Missionary Society.
- Ralph Mirrielees Cazalet, First Secretary, United Kingdom Delegation to the Organisation for Economic Co-operation and Development.
- Sydney John Chesterton, British subject resident in Peru.
- Richard Radcliffe Darlington, MBE, Headmaster, Sheikh Secondary School, Somali Republic.
- John Casson Dickinson, British subject resident in Sweden.
- Robin Antony Hare Duke, lately British Council Representative, Chile, and Cultural Attaché, Her Majesty's Embassy, Santiago.
- Joan Mary Findlay, British subject resident in Argentina.
- Ethelbert Terence Grew, British subject resident in Denmark.
- John George Macfarlane, British Consul, Antofagasta.
- Kenneth Charles Parsons, lately First Secretary, Her Majesty's Embassy, Rangoon.
- Leonard Unthank Salkield, British subject resident in Spain.
- John Sidney Augustus Selwyn, MBE, First Secretary (Commercial), Her Majesty's Embassy, Beirut.
- Ian Monteith Vallentine, lately Joint Headmaster, Bishop's School, Amman.
- Professor Henry Ingham Ashworth, Dean of the Faculty of Architecture, University of Sydney, State of New South Wales.
- John Speir Baird, MB, BS, President of the Dental Board, State of New South Wales.
- Colonel Leslie Hugh Bean, MBE, General Manager of the Ghana Chamber of Mines.
- Lady Moyna Blanche Madeleine Browne, chairman, Hospitality Committee, Victoria League.
- Richard Joseph Wauchope Craig, MC, Assistant Commissioner of Police, Federation of Malaya.
- Joseph Victor Danckwerts, chairman, Land Settlement Board, Southern Rhodesia.
- Desmond Nigel Davies, Director of Geological Survey and Commissioner of Mines, Swaziland.
- Idris Talog Davies, Senior Federal Counsel, Attorney-General's Chambers, Federation of Malaya.
- Donald Robert Day, Director of Education, Basutoland.
- Sydney Clarence French. For public services in the State of Tasmania.
- James Halliday, formerly deputy director of Public Works, Federation of Malaya.
- Marshall Hamer, chairman, Chittagong Branch, United Kingdom Association of Pakistan.
- Philip Bellair Hayes. For services to ex-servicemen, in the State of Victoria.
- Robert Arthur Hughes, MB, FRCS, Senior Medical Officer, Klhasi Hills, Welsh Mission Hospital, Shillong, Assam, India. For services to the British community.
- Merlin Kay Neil Johansen, Engineer for the Shire of Midura, State of Victoria.
- Jocelyn Amy Ashley Kingsley, chairman, Commonwealth Students Committee, Victoria League.
- Gordon Leckie. For public services in the State of Victoria.
- Robert Bowden Madgwick, Vice-Chancellor of the University of New England, State of New South Wales.
- Walter Wilson Mayne. For services to the British community in South India.
- John Alexander Hughes McGeorge, MB, ChM, a consultant psychiatrist in the State of New South Wales.
- James Francis McGill. For services to charitable organisations in the State of Queensland.
- Kenneth Gordon McIntyre, Mayor of the City of Box Hill, State of Victoria.
- Gertrude Monica Millington, Headmistress, Woodlands Church of England Girls' School, State of South Australia.
- William Ralston, MBE, Director of Mines and Chairman of the Mining Affairs Board, Southern Rhodesia.
- Edmund Payne Shepherd, Manager, Murray River Wholesale Co-operative Ltd., State of South Australia.
- Kenneth Unsworth, Director of Veterinary Services, Bechuanaland Protectorate.
- Eben Gowrie Waterhouse. For services to the community in the State of New South Wales.
- Herbert William Watson, Honorary Secretary and Superintendent, Montrose Home for Crippled Children, Brisbane, State of Queensland.
- Joseph Dudley Westwood, MC. For services to ex-servicemen in the State of New South Wales.
- Hector McDonald Wright, JP, Secretary, Royal Hobart Hospital, State of Tasmania.
- Emilius Joseph Alvarez. For public services in Gibraltar.
- Richard Angeloni, MBE, Administrative Officer, New Hebrides.
- Norman Alec Cameron, Commissioner of Prisons, Ugandia.
- John Heywood Common, Director of Public Works, Fiji.
- Kenneth Raymond Cook, MBE, Director of Audit, Zanzibar.
- David John Coward, Registrar-General, Kenya.
- Abraham Cyril Cyrus. For public services in St. Vincent.
- Gordon Paul Darke, Deputy Secretary (Administration), Ministry of Education, Singapore.
- Berenice Iyvoll Dolly. For services to nursing in Trinidad.
- Fadzil bin Asmad, lately Head Teacher, Kerupang Government Primary School, Labuan, North Borneo.
- Thomas Vincent Garland, Acting Permanent Secretary for Works, Ministry of Works, Kenya.
- George Gordon Geddes, Assistant Chief Operating Superintendent, East African Railways and Harbours.
- John David Gillett, assistant director, East African Virus Research Institute, East African Common Services Organisation.
- Cyril Da Costa Gittens, Auditor-General, Barbados.
- Patrick John Gleeson. For public services in Northern Rhodesia.
- Samuel Horatio Graham, Attorney-General, St. Christopher, Nevis and Anguilla.
- John Fielden Griffiths, Deputy Engineer-in-Chief, Ministry of Works, Uganda.
- Marjorie Steele Hallett, Headmistress, Bermuda High School for Girls.
- Graham Wynn Hill. For public services in Nyasaland.
- Reverend Archibald Clive Irvine, MD, ChB. For public services in Kenya.
- Kenneth Paton-Jones, DFC, Director of Civil Aviation, Jamaica.
- Noel Marriott Kenny, General Manager, Mufulira Mine, Northern Rhodesia.
- Robert Knowles, Commissioner of Trade and Customs, North Borneo.
- Gordon Vere Mancini, Permanent Secretary, Ministry of Communications and Works, Federation of West Indies.
- Edward Howard McKinney, Comptroller of Customs, Biabamas.
- Boleslaw Markowski, Hospital Superintendent and Surgeon Specialist, British Honduras.
- Besweri Kisalita Mulyanti, MBE. For public services in Uganda.
- John Anthony Leighton Pavitt, JP, Master Attendant, Singapore.
- John Sturt Pullinger, GM, Director of Public Works, Gambia.
- William Arthur Richardson, Federal Information Officer, West Indies.
- Alexander Ross, British Council Representative in Kenya.
- Samuel Harry Saunders, Senior Engineer, Crown Agents for Oversea Governments and Administrations.
- Hilary Colville-Stewart, Chief Intelligence Officer, Aden.
- Teng Pin-Hui, MB, BS, deputy director of Medical and Health Services, Hong Kong.
- George William Osborne Tomkins, Organisation and Methods Adviser, Nyasaland.
- Marie Michel Auguste Toussaint, Chief Archivist, Mauritius.
- Hilton Augustus Vaughan, lately Registrar of the Supreme Court, Barbados.
- William Bernard Joseph Willems, General Manager, Clove Growers' Association, Zanzibar.
- Gwilym Rhys Williams. For public services in Kenya.
- John Kennedy Wilson, DFC, AFC, Officer-in-charge, Community Development Scheme, Sarawak.
- Aubrey Derek Winslow, Personnel Manager, Cameroons Development Corporation.
- Luther Reginald Wynter, MBE, MD, CM. For public services in Antigua.
- William Maynard Younger, MBE, Commissioner of Lands, Northern Rhodesia.
- David Levric Davies, Solicitor-General, Tanganyika.
- Salehe Kibwana. For public services in Tanganyika.
- Selwyn Willis Fraser-Smith, MC, Deputy Permanent Secretary, Prime Minister's Office, Tanganyika.

==== Member of the Order of the British Empire (MBE) ====
Military Division

Royal Navy

- Lieutenant-Commander Bernard Bevans, DSC.
- Temporary Lieutenant-Commander (S.C.C.) Jack Rupert Boulton, Royal Naval Reserve.
- Engineer Lieutenant-Commander Albert James Bravery, DSM, (Retired).
- Major (S.D.) Clarence Merrifield Carter, Royal Marines.
- First Officer Phyllis Cooper, Women's Royal Naval Service.
- Lieutenant-Commander Charles Edward Dewey, VRD, Royal Naval Reserve.
- Lieutenant-Commander John Arthur Douglas.
- Lieutenant-Commander Richard Cecil Dumas, DSC.
- Engineer Lieutenant-Commander Edwin William Gurney, (Retired).
- Lieutenant-Commander Nigel Elmore Carr Hammond.
- Recruiting Officer Herbert Henry Harris, Royal Marines.
- Temporary Lieutenant-Commander (C.C.F.) George Richardson McConnell, Royal Naval Reserve.
- Instructor Lieutenant-Commander Cyril Alfred Sinfield, (Retired).
- Supply Lieutenant-Commander Stanley William Walker, (Retired).

Army

- Major (Q.G.O.) Bagbir Limbu, MVO, MC, (388494), 7th Duke of Edinburgh's Own Gurkha Rifles.
- Captain Joseph Frederick Luther Bailey (338174), King's Shropshire Light Infantry, Territorial Army.
- 22982918 Warrant Officer Class II Thomas Samuel Baynham, Royal Berkshire Regiment (Princess Charlotte of Wales's), Territorial Army.
- Major Vivian James Henry Bennett (105952), Royal Regiment of Artillery.
- Major Joseph Birks (385010), Corps of Royal Military Police, Territorial Army.
- Major George Mather Bridge, TD, (75205), Royal Regiment of Artillery.
- Lieutenant Bernard William Britnell (467460), Royal Army Dental Corps.
- Major (now Lieutenant-Colonel) John Brough, DSO, MC, (345091), King's Own Royal Border Regiment.
- Major (Quartermaster) David John Brunton (182510), 3rd Carbiniers (Prince of Wales's Dragoon Guards), Royal Armoured Corps.
- Captain (Quartermaster) Leslie Edward Burrell (431483), Grenadier Guards.
- Major (acting) John Henry Chambers (290999), Army Cadet Force.
- Major John Wells Chittock (357192), Army Catering Corps.
- Major Eric Albert Clark (199069), Corps of Royal Military Police.
- Major (acting) Alan Cree, ERD, (34049), Combined Cadet Force.
- Major (Staff Quartermaster) Charles George Cresswell (244467), Employed List 2.
- 22255414 Warrant Officer Class II William Ernest Davidson, Royal Northumberland Fusiliers, Territorial Army.
- Major Gordon Thomas Edgar Dawe (264058), Royal Army Service Corps.
- 3652549 Warrant Office Class I Arthur Emmett, Lancashire Regiment (Prince of Wales's Volunteers).
- 6292014 Warrant Officer Class I Douglas Fairbanks, Queen's Own Buffs, Royal Kent Regiment.
- Major (Quartermaster) George Foster (423393), York and Lancaster Regiment.
- T/62432 Warrant Officer Class II Charles Edward Graves, Royal Army Service Corps, Territorial Army.
- Major Thomas Jesse Howard Hall (266266), Corps of Royal Electrical and Mechanical Engineers.
- Major Philip Handfield Haslett (357006), Grenadier Guards.
- Major Desmond Eric Higgins (304738), Royal Corps of Signals.
- Major Patrick John Jackson (325745), Corps of Royal Electrical and Mechanical Engineers.
- 22543573 Warrant Officer Class II Leonard Jacobs, Corps of Royal Engineers, Territorial Army.
- Reverend William Jamieson, Chaplain to the Forces, Third Class (380410), Royal Army Chaplains' Department.
- 37177 Warrant Officer Class I Stephen Johnson, Corps of Royal Electrical and Mechanical Engineers, Territorial Army.
- Major Gwyneth Fleetwood Fleetwood-Jones (270222), Women's Royal Army Corps.
- Major (Quartermaster) Ronald George Lambert (265366), Corps of Royal Engineers.
- Major (now Lieutenant-Colonel) Mortimer Cecil Lanyon, MC, (105881), Royal Regiment of Artillery.
- 2821652 Warrant Officer Class I David Booth Stewart Macdonald, Royal Highland Fusiliers (Princess Margaret's Own Glasgow and Ayrshire Regiment).
- 22267754 Warrant Officer Class II George Herbert Machen, Duke of Wellington's Regiment (West Riding), Territorial Army.
- Major (now Lieutenant-Colonel (temporary)) James Herbert Samuel Majury (193883), Royal Ulster Rifles.
- 1443592 Warrant Officer Class II William Brown Marshall, MM, Parachute Regiment, Territorial Army.
- Captain (Electrical Mechanical Assistant Engineer) William Richard Meadows (428257), Corps of Royal Electrical and Mechanical Engineers.
- Lieutenant (Quartermaster) Kenneth Melley (461587), Royal Regiment of Artillery.
- Captain (Electrical Mechanical Assistant Engineer) Clifford Kenneth Mobbs (451407), Corps of Royal Electrical and Mechanical Engineers.
- Major John Colin Moore (377590), Royal Army Ordnance Corps.
- Major (temporary) Joseph David Mostyn (397994), 1st Green Jackets, 43rd and 52nd.
- Captain (Quartermaster) Walter John Murray (448122), 6th Queen Elizabeth's Own Gurkha Rifles.
- Wakil Qaid Awal (acting) Abdulla Nasser (3506), Aden Protectorate Levies.
- Major Frank Shields Petrie (258923), Royal Corps of Signals.
- Major (Quartermaster) William Edward Phillpotts (317410), Royal Tank Regiment, Royal Armoured Corps (now retired).
- 21181369 Warrant Officer Class I Richard Rafferty, Royal Inniskilling Fusiliers.
- Major Sidney Park Robertson (143056), Royal Regiment of Artillery, Territorial Army.
- Captain (Quartermaster) Alexander Edward Robinson (355338), Parachute Regiment.
- Major Patrick Brian Thomas Ross (334625), King's Own Royal Border Regiment.
- 813004 Warrant Officer Class II Arthur Henry Sheppard, Royal Regiment of Artillery, Territorial Army.
- Major Barry Graham Simpson (304028), Royal Regiment of Artillery.
- Major (Quartermaster) Douglas Smith (291684), Royal Regiment of Artillery (Employed List 4).
- Major Denis Cecil Blomfield-Smith (151342), Royal Regiment of Artillery.
- 1652231 Warrant Officer Class I Eric Allan Smith, Royal Army Ordnance Corps.
- 22206109 Warrant Officer Class II Hector George Sterling, North Somerset Yeomanry/44th Royal Tank Regiment, Royal Armoured Corps, Territorial Army.
- Major John Strelley (365369), Royal Army Service Corps.
- 949497 Warrant Officer Class I Johnson Tattersall, Army Catering Corps.
- Major Alfred Thomas Taylor (132469), Durham Light Infantry.
- 7650010 Warrant Officer Class I Walter Dixon Taylor, Royal Army Ordnance Corps.
- 21001392 Warrant Officer Class II George Wallace, Ayrshire Yeomanry (Earl of Carrick's Own), Royal Armoured Corps, Territorial Army.
- Major Thomas Francis Watling (368784), Corps of Royal Engineers.
- Major (acting) Francis Vincent Augustine Wells (401123), Combined Cadet Force (Now retired).
- Reverend Frederick William Hartland White, Chaplain to the Forces, Third Class (406756), Royal Army Chaplains' Department.
- Major (acting) Hubert Cyril Whiteside (319232), Army Cadet Force.
- Captain Ronald Duncan Winton (170138), Royal Regiment of Artillery (Employed List 3).
- 22519985 Warrant Officer Class II Henry Walter Wright, Duke of Cornwall's Light Infantry, Territorial Army.
- Captain Margaret Amy Boyle (412904), Queen Alexandra's Royal Army Nursing Corps; formerly on loan to the Government of Ghana.
- Major (temporary) John Ruddiman Buchanan (411900), King's Regiment (Manchester and Liverpool); formerly on loan to the Government of Ghana.
- 14092042 Warrant Officer Class I (acting) (now Warrant Officer Class II) Charles Lionel Golder, Corps of Royal Engineers; formerly on loan to the Government of Ghana.
- Captain John Michael Howlett Johnson (421201), Royal Sussex Regiment; on loan to the Government of Ghana.
- 2697365 Warrant Officer Class II Murdo McLeod Leitch, Scots Guards; formerly on loan to the Government of Ghana.
- Major Lemarquis John Long (363825), Royal Army Medical Corps; on loan to the Government of Ghana.
- Captain Martin Anthony Melsom, MB, BS, (466295), Royal Army Medical Corps; on loan to the Government of Ghana.
- Major William Jackson Pallister (314054), Royal Army Pay Corps; on loan to the Government of Ghana.
- Captain Ronald John Gordon Panton (239683), Corps of Royal Engineers; on loan to the Government of Ghana.
- 2548587 Warrant Officer Class II Robert Rodney Skipp, Corps of Royal Engineers; on loan to the Government of Ghana.
- Captain Ronald Augustine Thompson, MB, BS, (464278), Royal Army Medical Corps; on loan to the Government of Ghana.
- 5771470 Warrant Officer Class II Henry Ward, 1st East Anglian Regiment (Royal Norfolk and Suffolk); formerly on loan to the Government of Ghana.
- Major (temporary) Thomas Michael Dillon-White (253632), Corps of Royal Military Police; formerly on loan to the Government of the Federation of Malaya.

Royal Air Force

- Squadron Officer Marjorie Bennion (8457), Women's Royal Air Force.
- Squadron Leader George Mallory Braid (144048), (Retired).
- Squadron Leader Herbert John Lloyd Cash (361935).
- Squadron Leader Gordon Neville Victor Chignall (52036).
- Squadron Leader Peter Mainwaring Dunstan (57451).
- Squadron Leader William Arthur Greene (50166).
- Squadron Leader Kenneth William Holmes (166603).
- Squadron Leader Harold David Hughes (50400).
- Squadron Leader (Acting Wing Commander) Graeme Ibbotson (172139).
- Squadron Leader James Anthony Jones (50706).
- Squadron Leader Ronald Stephen Langton (54050).
- Squadron Leader Thomas William Leary (52499).
- Squadron Leader Frederic McGonigle (189875).
- Squadron Leader Edward Albert Thomas Mack (108261).
- Squadron Leader George William Milburn (169859).
- Squadron Leader Brian Kiddle Morris (54189).
- Squadron Leader Alan Dudley Scott Phillips (202463).
- Squadron Leader James Herbert Christopher Plummer (157863).
- Squadron Leader Keith William Rowe (576881).
- Squadron Leader Harry John Sadd (137201).
- Squadron Leader Alfred Frank Simmons (46444).
- Squadron Leader Cecil Frederick Whitehouse (120507).
- Squadron Leader Anthony Desmond Jeens Williams (131152).
- Acting Squadron Leader James Wilfred Adams, AFC, (57046).
- Acting Squadron Leader Arthur John Attwood (122264), Royal Air Force Volunteer Reserve (Training Branch).
- Acting Squadron Leader Herbert George Baker (101867), Royal Air Force Volunteer Reserve (Training Branch).
- Acting Squadron Leader Raymond Clive Tear (503122).
- Flight Lieutenant Robert Louis Abbott (176539).
- Flight Lieutenant John Brown (1065710).
- Flight Lieutenant Frederick James Durrant (570428).
- Flight Lieutenant Allan Lenane Ford (503728).
- Flight Lieutenant Robin Lowther Lees (607218).
- Flight Lieutenant Colston Edward Nichols (144488), Royal Auxiliary Air Force Reserve of Officers.
- Flight Lieutenant Charles Dennis Smith, DFC, (184378).
- Flight Lieutenant Alfred Trow Warburton (91299), Royal Auxiliary Air Force.
- Flight Lieutenant Waclaw Zajaczkowski (500392).
- Warrant Officer Henry Bernard Hammond (536180), Royal Air Force Regiment.
- Warrant Officer Francis Joseph Nicole (365088).
- Warrant Officer Sidney Percy Walter Pearce (521357).
- Warrant Officer Ray Peters (614159).
- Warrant Officer Christopher Plaice (544598).
- Warrant Officer Samuel Poag (524873).
- Warrant Officer John Falkland Wood (565955).

Civil Division

- William Albert George Acocks, Clerk, Cheltenham Rural District Council.
- Eleanor Elizabeth Aicken, Matron, Ulster Hospital for Children and Women, Belfast.
- Mary Elsie Alison, Higher Executive Officer, Forestry Commission.
- Gracie West Craig Allen, Senior Assistant and Woman Adviser, Torphichen Street Commercial Institute, Edinburgh.
- William George Arthur, Senior Executive Officer, Board of Trade.
- Walter Ashton, Registrar of Births, Deaths and Marriages, York West Sub-district of the District of York.
- Albert Ashworth, Group Secretary, Mansfield Hospital Management Committee, Nottinghamshire.
- Percy William John Ayerst. For political and public services in Leyton.
- David Bailey, chairman, Blackburn, Clitheroe and District War Pensions Committee.
- Edith Dora Bailey. For political and public services in Manchester.
- George Frederick Bailey, Higher Executive Officer, Ministry of Health.
- Lewis Bain, JP, Provost of Cullen, Banffshire.
- James Baird, Member, Scottish Savings Committee.
- Harry Baker, JP, Secretary, Trades Union Congress Midland Regional Advisory Committee.
- Winifred Mary Ballachey, Head of Membership Department and Records, National Trust.
- Stephen Percy Bancroft, Senior Executive Officer, Board of Trade.
- Walter Bannerman, Organiser, Scottish Savings Committee.
- William George Bareham, lately Quarter Master, East Riding of the County of York Territorial and Auxiliary Forces Association.
- Stewart Wilson Palmer Barter. For political services in Kingston upon Thames and Surbiton.
- Clifford Bartram, Chief Clerk, Birmingham, Board of Customs and Excise.
- Cyril Bates, Director and Secretary, Clelands (Successors), Ltd., Wallsend, Northumberland.
- Samuel Victor Baume, Chief Inspector, Public Service Vehicles Branch, Ministry of Home Affairs for Northern Ireland.
- Stanley Beadle, Production Director, Muirhead & Co. Ltd., Beckenham.
- William Edward Bee, Chief Engineer, MV Lancing, Stephenson Clarke Ltd., London.
- Peter Paul Bellizzi, Assistant Civil Secretary to Flag Officer, Malta, Admiralty.
- Nellie Bennion, Grader of Cheshire Cheese for the Milk Marketing Board under the Farmhouse Makers' Scheme.
- Theodor Mary Bertram, Clerical Officer, Tropical Products Institute, Department of Scientific and Industrial Research.
- Charles Richard Betts, Senior Executive Officer, Ministry of Pensions and National Insurance.
- Captain John George Betts, Master, MV Testbank, Andrew Weir & Co. Ltd., London.
- George William Bibb, Civil Defence Officer, Dundee.
- Hugh Douglas Binyon, Sales Director, Solartron Electronic Group Ltd.
- Shirley Frances Birch, Supervisor (Photocopying), Ministry of Transport.
- Captain Claude William Bird, Director, E. A. Bird & Sons, Ltd.
- Betty Joan Black, Higher Executive Officer, Air Ministry.
- Elizabeth Knibb Blackburn, HM Inspector of Factories, Class IA, Ministry of Labour.
- Vivian Charles Blackmore, lately Officer in Charge, Glasgow Branch, Passport Office.
- Violet Ellen Blissett, Clerical Officer Secretary, Ministry of Power.
- Thomas Bourne, Secretary and Treasurer, No. 351 (Burton-on-Trent) Squadron, Air Training Corps.
- Herbert Hardy Brabbs, JP, chairman, Thorne Local Employment Committee.
- Patricia Inez Brandt, Personal Assistant to the Clerk of the House of Commons.
- William James Charles Bridger, District Officer, HM Coastguard, St. Just, Cornwall.
- Phyllis Kissane Bristow, Centre Organiser, Stepney Metropolitan Borough, Women's Voluntary Service.
- John Harold Broadhurst, Senior Executive Engineer, General Post Office.
- Leonard Broadwell, Clerical Officer, Headquarters North Midland Area, War Office.
- Frederick Harold Brooks. For political and public services in Edmonton.
- Frederick Oliver Bruce, Senior Executive Officer, Ministry of Pensions and National Insurance.
- Frank Haigh Buckley, Regional Education Officer, British Forces Education Service, Germany, War Office.
- Maud Bunford, Secretary, Royal Asiatic Society.
- Aubrey Denis Burt, Chief Superintendent and Assistant Chief Constable, Bristol Constabulary.
- Walter George Busbridge, Head of Industrial Liaison, Isotope Research Division, Harwell, United Kingdom Atomic Energy Authority.
- Edward Capel, Higher Executive Officer, No. 15 Maintenance Unit, Royal Air Force, Wroughton.
- Observer Lieutenant George Marchbank Chalmers, Group Officer, No. 23 Group, Royal Observer Corps.
- Kathleen Ruth Chance, Attached War Office.
- Doris Pepita Chappell, chairman, Friends of Bath and Wessex Orthopaedic Hospital.
- Lieutenant Basil Henry Charlton, Royal Navy (Retired), Naval Proof Officer, Admiralty.
- Mary Cuningham Chater, JP, lately Music Adviser, Commonwealth Headquarters, Girl Guides Association.
- William Roy Chennells, Engineer Technician "B", Foreign Office.
- Nicholas Cheshire, Intelligence Evaluation Officer, Admiralty.
- Hildreth Eileen Chettle, Supervisor of the Wolverhampton Special Training Centre for Mentally Disordered Children.
- Mary Violet Chubb, lately Secretary, Barristers' Benevolent Association.
- Alice Crosley Clifford, Centre Organiser for the Medway Towns, Women's Voluntary Service.
- Edward Charles Cole, Senior Executive Officer, General Post Office.
- Dorothy Irene Collis, Head Almoner, Moorfields Eye Hospital, London.
- George Frederick Campbell Combe, Administrative Officer, City and Guilds of London Institute.
- Betty Nina Cooper, Assistant, London Overseas Students Department, British Council.
- Tom Cornelius, JP, Member, representing the National Union of Agricultural Workers, Somerset County Agricultural Executive Committee.
- Arthur Cox, Works Engineer (Civil Engineering), Windscale and Calder Works, Cumberland, United Kingdom Atomic Energy Authority.
- John Crabtree, Employer Vice-chairman, Burnley District Advisory Committee, North Western Regional Board for Industry.
- Cedric Crossley, Lately Junior Temporary Assistant, Headquarters Near East Land Forces, War Office.
- William Arthur Crowe, Chief Superintendent, Manchester City Police.
- Ernest Culshaw, Senior Executive Officer, Ministry of Health.
- Minnie Curry, Honorary Secretary, Chester-le-Street Savings Committee, County Durham.
- Tewfik Elias Dahdal, Officer in Charge of Barracks, Aden and the Western Aden Protectorate, War Office.
- George Dallas. For services to the Cross Country Union of Scotland.
- Thomas Christopher Dalton, Clerical Officer, Ministry of Defence.
- Doris Prior Dangerfield, chairman, Northern London War Pensions Committee.
- Adelaide Katharine Daniel, JP. For public services in Somerset.
- Albert Darwent, Actuary, Blackburn Trustee Savings Bank.
- Lieutenant-Colonel Alexander Davidson, TD, chairman, East Cumberland War Pensions Committee.
- Derek Alec Davie, Senior Draughtsman, Admiralty.
- David Wheway Davies, Divisional Officer and Deputy Chief Officer, Denbighshire and Montgomeryshire Fire Brigade.
- Morgan Ivor Davies, Member Leicestershire County Agricultural Executive Committee.
- Robert Henry Davies, DFC, Senior Executive Officer, Commonwealth Relations Office.
- Bernard Henry Dawes, Service Manager, Steel & Co. Ltd., Sunderland.
- Arthur James Diggle, chairman, Haslemere Urban District Council.
- Effie Dixon, Clerical Officer Secretary, Office of the Divisional Road Engineer (North Eastern), Ministry of Transport.
- Leonard Arthur Doggett. For services to the Royal Air Force Association.
- James Joseph Peter Paul Charles Congress Dowdall, Civilian Administrative Officer, Royal Air Force, Takali, Malta.
- George Frederick Doyle, Higher Executive Officer, Ministry of Pensions and National Insurance.
- Johannes Bendix Drongeson, JP, Vice-chairman, South Wales Industrial Savings Advisory Committee.
- Phyllis Irene Dunn, lately Executive Officer, Foreign Office.
- Gertrude Annie Duponchel. For political and public services in Ealing.
- Harold Henry Haines Edwards. For political services in Devizes.
- Stanley Henry Elliott, chairman and managing director, H. J. Elliott, Ltd., Treforest.
- Arthur Robert Emerson, Head of the Silversmithing and Allied Crafts Department, Central School of Arts and Crafts.
- Arthur John Evans, Clerk, Llangefni Urban District Council, Anglesey.
- Arthur Farenden, Grade B, Technical Works Officer, Ministry of Agriculture, Fisheries and Food.
- George Reid Farquhar, Senior Executive Officer, Ministry of Pensions and National Insurance.
- James Farquhar, Head Forester, Forestry Commission, Scotland.
- Robert Johnston Fisher. For political services in Gateshead.
- Grace Hilda Fitzgerald, Principal Nursing Sister, HM Prison, Manchester.
- Charles Austen Flaxman, Technical Superintendent (Engineering), No. 2 Maintenance Unit, Royal Air Force, Sealand.
- Lelah Florence Fleet, Headmistress, Oldway County Primary School, Paignton, Devon.
- Robert Dickson Forbes, Executive Officer, Scottish Education Department.
- Squadron Leader Harry Forshaw, Chairman of Committee, No. 1301 (Fleetwood) Squadron, Air Training Corps.
- Evelyn Maude Stuart-Fox, lately Organiser, Scotland, Women's Voluntary Service.
- Dorothy Fraser, Matron, Crow Wood Hospital, Widnes, Lancashire.
- Albert French, Civil Defence Officer, Lambeth.
- Margaret Fyfield, lately County Organiser (Sussex Rural Community Council) for Old People's Welfare in East Sussex.
- Jack Vincent Gage, lately Senior Executive Officer, Ministry of Aviation.
- Captain Herbert William Gates, Master, MV Rowanmore, Prince Line Ltd., London.
- Herbert Temple Gidney. For political services in King's Lynn.
- Berenice Mary Gill, Grade 3 Officer, Branch B, Foreign Office.
- Alice Frederica Girardot, President, Tillingbourne Valley Division, Surrey Branch, British Red Cross Society.
- Charlotte Mary Goodchild, Senior Experimental Officer, Ministry of Aviation.
- William Glennie Gordon, Senior Executive Officer, Ministry of Pensions and National Insurance.
- Kathleen Hermione Gracey, BEM, lately Clothing Officer, No. 7 Region, Women's Voluntary Service.
- Henry James Green, lately Head Postmaster, Bridgwater, Somerset.
- George Greenhill, lately Higher Executive Officer, Department of Health for Scotland.
- Alice Kathleen Gregson, Secretary to Regional Manager, British European Airways Corporation.
- Edward Griffiths, Drawing Office Manager, Ministry of Aviation.
- Eric Arthur Griffiths, Divisional Officer and Deputy Chief Officer, Bournemouth Fire Brigade.
- Iorwerth Griffiths, chairman, North Wales Schools Advisory Savings Committee.
- William Frederick Gronous, Higher Executive Officer, Ministry of Aviation.
- Cecil Tom Hackworthy. For public services in Langstone, Monmouthshire.
- Winifred Hales, Chief Superintendent of Typists, Ministry of Housing and Local Government.
- Mary Florence Harby. For political services in Ogmore.
- Lily Hardaker, JP. For political and public services in the West Riding of Yorkshire.
- Franklin Alexander Harffey, Secretary Hastings Fishermen's Guild.
- Ernest George Harman, Senior Assessor, War Damage Commission.
- Phyllis Irene Harvey, deputy director, formerly Far East, Soldiers', Sailors' and Airmen's Families Association.
- Captain Aubrey Cecil Hatfeild, JP, chairman, East Kent National Assistance Appeal Tribunal.
- Margaret Cecilia Hayes, Higher Executive Officer, North West Region, Manchester, National Assistance Board.
- Cecil Ralph Oswald Hedley, Traffic Superintendent, Newcastle Area, Northern General Transport Co. Ltd.
- Margaret Henderson, chairman, Street Savings Group Committee, Enniskillen.
- Nan Brown Hendrie, JP. For political and public services in Ayrshire.
- William Joseph Heritage, Chief Progress and Planning Officer, Forge, English Steel Corporation, Ltd., Sheffield.
- Edith Heyman, General Sales Manager, Smith's Delivery Vehicles, Ltd., Gateshead.
- Albert Lee Hill, Chief Ambulance Officer, Croydon County Borough.
- Margaret Alice Hine, Assistant Secretary, Commonwealth Press Union.
- Herbert Joseph Hirtz, Higher Executive Officer, Ministry of Agriculture, Fisheries and Food.
- Fredric Herbert Bedo Hobbs, JP, Member, National Savings Assembly, representing South-East Kent.
- Alfred Hodson, JP, lately Official of the Amalgamated Society of Woodworkers, Northampton Area.
- Allan James Holden, General Secretary, Association of British Chemical Manufacturers.
- Ernest Robert Holman, RD, Senior Superintendent, Mercantile Marine Office, Southampton, Ministry of Transport.
- Iona Mary Cowan Houston, County Secretary, Argyll Branch, British Red Cross Society.
- William Robert Howard, Assistant Principal Clerk, Board of Inland Revenue.
- Mary Kinghorn Howat, Executive Officer, Lord Advocate's Department.
- Cyril William Howe, General Manager and Secretary, British Legion Poppy Factory, Richmond.
- Elizabeth McDougall Hutcheson, Welfare Worker, lately Southern Cameroons, Women's Voluntary Service.
- Frederick Innis, Superintendent, Head Post Office, Preston, Lancashire.
- Charles Arthur Ireland, MM, Staff Officer, Board of Inland Revenue.
- Albert Edward Jaggar, Claims Adjuster, Hull Steam Trawlers' Mutual Insurance Co. Ltd.
- Observer Lieutenant Percival Reginald Johns, Duty Controller, No. 9 Group, Royal Observer Corps.
- George Eales-Johnson, Chief Office Clerk, Speaker's Department, House of Commons.
- Walter Johnstone, Inspector (Higher Grade), Board of Inland Revenue.
- John Llewelyn Jones, Solicitors' Managing Clerk, Amphlett & Company. Colwyn Bay.
- Lewis Jones, Councillor, Penybont Rural Distract Council, Glamorgan.
- Meryln Lawrence Jones, Chief Reconnaissance Officer, Monmouthshire Division, Civil Defence Corps.
- Patrick Robert Keller, Section Leader, Marconi's Wireless Telegraph Co. Ltd., Chelmsford.
- Ebenezer Kelso, lately Honorary Secretary, School Savings Groups, Glasgow.
- Leslie Frederick Kemp, Grade 3 Officer, Ministry of Labour.
- Gordon Geoffrey Kesby, Senior Executive Officer, (Colonial Office (on secondment to Department of Technical Co-operation).
- George Kiddle, JP, chairman, St. Ives Rural District Council, Huntingdonshire.
- Clifford Parker Kitchin, Chief Officer, Hastings Fire Brigade.
- Reginald Kitson, Secretary, Quran Group Companies, Cardiff.
- Fred Knight, Valuation Clerk (Higher Grade), Board of Inland Revenue.
- John Cedric Wilfred Knight, Senior Assistant, Finance Division, British Broadcasting Corporation.
- Richard Harday Knight, Senior Scientific Training Officer, Midland Civil Defence Region, Birmingham.
- Samuel Krantz, Convener and Almoner, Glasgow Jewish Board of Guardians.
- Marie Kathleen Alice Lamb. For public services in Lancashire.
- Margaret Winifred Lawes, Grade 4 Officer, Ministry of Labour.
- Agnes Lawrence, Executive Officer, Home Office.
- George Henry Samuel Lester. For political services.
- Gwilym Edward Lewis, Senior Partner, John Jones, Derw Mills, Llandyssul, South Wales.
- Thomas Lewis, Grade 4 Officer, Ministry of Labour.
- Archibald King Anderson Lockie, Head of Plumberwork Section, Ship Drawing Office, Alexander Stephen & Sons, Ltd., Glasgow.
- Margaret Winifred McCall, Assistant-in-Charge, Facilities Unit, British Broadcasting Corporation.
- Herbert Alexander McCann, Honorary Treasurer, London Ulster Association.
- Frederick Trafford McDaniel, lately Grade 4 Officer, Ministry of Labour.
- Elizabeth Speirs Wilson McDowall, lately Headmistress, St. Michael's Approved School for Senior Girls, Salisbury.
- Nathanial McFarland, Senior Assistant Manager, Harland & Wolff, Ltd., Belfast.
- Neil MacGregor, lately Head Forester, Glendye Estate, Kincardineshire.
- James Macdougal Mackintosh, Honorary Secretary, Edinburgh and East of Scotland Association of the Institution of Civil Engineers.
- Duncan Naysmith MacLachlan. For political services in Edinburgh.
- Alexander McMullen, MM, Adjutant, County Londonderry, Ulster Special Constabulary.
- Florence Marian McNeill, Writer on Scottish cooking.
- Esther Elliot McNicoll, District Nurse and Health Visitor, Sandwick, Birsay and Harray, County of Orkney.
- Ian Hamilton Macqueen, Production Manager, William McGeoch & Co. Ltd., Birmingham.
- Thomas Bateson McVea, Town Clerk of Carrickfergus.
- Allan Stewart McWilliam, chairman, National Proficiency Tests Committee in Farm Crafts, National Federation of Young Farmers' Clubs.
- William Howell Maddock, lately Headmaster, Caerau Junior Boys' School, Glamorgan.
- Phyllis Lilian Kathleen Mann, Superintendent, Counter and Writing, General Post Office.
- William Samuel Manners. For political and public services in Greenwich.
- William John Manson, chairman, Mallaig and North West Fishermen's Association.
- Frank Martin, JP. For public services in the West Riding of Yorkshire.
- Jessie Martin. For political and public services in Stockton-on-Tees.
- John Westwood Martin, Assistant to Manager, Personnel Department, Navy, Army and Air Force Institutes.
- Ernest Edward Mason, Honorary Secretary, Leicestershire Yeomanry Comrades Association.
- Harry Alexander Masters, Engineer-in-Charge, Daventry, British Broadcasting Corporation.
- Frederick Mastin, Chief Superintendent, Machine Shops, East Kilbride Factory, Rolls-Royce Ltd., Glasgow.
- Dudley John Mathias, Executive Officer, Commonwealth Relations Office.
- George Herbert Maxwell, Deputy Principal Officer, Ministry of Commerce for Northern Ireland.
- John Ingley Melrose, JP, President, Nelson Club for Physically Handicapped Persons, Derbyshire.
- Charles George Miller. For political services in Staffordshire.
- Marjorie Henrietta Miller, County Superintendent (Nursing), Suffolk, St. John Ambulance Brigade.
- Leslie Mitchell, Assistant Estate Surveyor, Ministry of Works.
- Howard Victor Mobley, Executive Works Director, Midland Bright Drawn Steel & Engineering Co. Ltd.
- Reedham Frederick Monger, Inspecting Officer, Public Record Office.
- Ethel Monks. For political services in Blackley.
- Leonard Monroe, Architect for Wales (Ancient Monuments), Ministry of Works.
- John Whitelock Moore. For political services.
- Emanuel Morris, Senior Executive Officer, Air Ministry.
- Winifred Moves, Ward Sister, St. Mary Abbot's Hospital, Kensington.
- Carrie Elizabeth Mummery, Higher Executive Officer, Board of Customs and Excise.
- Alice Lavinia Munson. For political and public services in Lincolnshire.
- Chewa Haikula Pandurangam Naidu, Clerk, Special Grade, Headquarters, Far East Air Force.
- Frederick Charles Nicholls, Principal Electrical Overseer, Admiralty.
- Dorothy Mary Allan Oag, Divisional Director, Medway Towns, Kent Branch, British Red Cross Society.
- John George Imeson Olsen, Higher Executive Officer, Aeroplane and Armament Experimental Establishment, Boscombe Down, Ministry of Aviation.
- Terence Walter Palk, Manager, Technical Development, Shipbuilding, Spirax-Sarco Ltd., Cheltenham.
- Beatrice Primrose Park, Honorary Secretary, London Industrial Safety Committee (Central Metropolitan Group).
- William Frank Parsons, Station Engineer, Tokyo (Eastern Routes), British Overseas Airways Corporation.
- Dorothy Annie Pearce, Grade 4 Officer, Branch B, Foreign Office.
- John Pescod, Senior Investigation Officer, Board of Customs and Excise.
- William Alan Pettigrew, MC, Area Superintendent, Northern Area, United Kingdom Region, Commonwealth War Graves Commission.
- Eva Pine. For political and public services in Oldbury and Halesowen.
- Herbert Leslie Podger, Higher Executive Officer, Ministry of Pensions and National Insurance.
- Jean Beith Pollock, Housing Manager, Scottish Special Housing Association, Ltd.
- Winifred Preston, Secretary to successive Directors of the Council of Social Service for Wales and Monmouthshire.
- Frank Price, Higher Executive Officer, Scottish Command Works Office, War Office.
- Alderman Francis John Priest, Member, National Savings Assembly, Representing Cambridgeshire.
- Dorothy Emily Pringle, Officer for Civil Defence, Cumberland, Women's Voluntary Service.
- Emily Elizabeth Caroline Copp Puddicombe, Higher Executive Officer, Board of Trade.
- Alfred Johnson Randall, Senior Information Officer, Ministry of Labour.
- George Arthur Read, BEM, Chief Superintendent and Deputy Chief Constable, East Suffolk Constabulary.
- John Harry Dunn Ridley, Head of Engineering Secretariat, British Broadcasting Corporation.
- Arthur Charles Robb, Actuary, Comptroller's Department, London County Council.
- Gwilym John Roberts, Executive Officer, War Office.
- John Herbert Roberts, chairman, Aberystwyth Branch, British Legion.
- Llewelyn Edward Roberts, President, Market Drayton Savings Committee, Shropshire.
- Kenneth Ashton Robertson. For services to Civil Defence in Kent.
- William Johnson Robinson, Regional Fatstock Officer, Cambridge, Ministry of Agriculture, Fisheries and Food.
- Olive May Rolls, chairman, Bristol Street Groups Savings Committee.
- Horace William Rose, Works Manager, Hobourn Aero Components, Ltd.
- Frederick Dallas Ross, Technical Survey Officer, War Office.
- Alan Russell. For political services in the East of Scotland.
- Marjorie Minnie Russon, Chief Superintendent of Typists, HM Treasury.
- Archibald Geddes Sampson, Ship Manager, Vickers-Armstrongs (Shipbuilders) Ltd., Newcastle upon Tyne.
- William Edward Sanderson, lately chairman, West Norfolk Youth Employment Committee.
- Major John Holt Schooling, Deputy Commissioner, National Savings Committee.
- Ann Campbell Scott, Executive Officer, Commonwealth Relations Office.
- Frank Henry Scott, Senior Inspector, Southern Region, British Railways.
- Frederick Bell-Scott, Honorary Secretary, Birmingham Vernon Unit, Sea Cadet Corps.
- Gavin Struthers Scott, Works Manager, Motherwell Bridge & Engineering Co. Ltd., Lanarkshire.
- Edward George Seath, JP, Youth Secretary and Organiser, Bristol.
- James Shand. For services to Scottish Country Dancing.
- Arthur Thomas Shaw, County Youth Employment Officer, Nottinghamshire.
- Donald Harry Samuel Simpson, ERD, Chief Telecommunications Superintendent, General Post Office.
- George Simpson, Superintendent and Deputy Chief Constable, Ayrshire Constabulary.
- Mabel Irene Skan, Experimental Officer, Royal Botanic Gardens, Kew.
- Ivy Lucille Slater. For services to the welfare of animals in Kidderminster.
- James William Slee, Senior Executive Officer, Air Ministry.
- James Alexander Cameron Sloan, Chief Investigation Officer, Ministry of Agriculture, Fisheries and Food.
- Reverend Israel Wolf Slotki, Honorary Publicity Officer, Salford, North Western National Savings Region.
- John Smeaton, Chief Librarian, British Council, India.
- Edward Joseph Smith, Senior Executive Officer, Ministry of Transport.
- Lieutenant-Colonel Geoffrey Saville Smith, MC, TD. For political services in Glasgow.
- Jessie Vida Wallace-Smith, Higher Executive Officer, Joint Services Liaison Organisation (Germany), War Office.
- Minnie Smith, lately Principal, Wheatfield Infants' County Primary School, Belfast.
- Charles Cooper Snowden, TD, Executive Officer, War Office.
- Percy James Southon, Camp Warden, South Wiltshire, Boy Scouts Association.
- Walter John Figgins Sparks, Clerical Officer, Ministry of Education.
- William Sparrow, District Inspector, Royal Ulster Constabulary.
- Lewis Harold Spencer, Area Chief Surveyor, East Midlands Division, National Coal Board.
- Charles Vincent Stabler, Clerical Officer, Central Ordnance Depot, Branston, War Office (Died 20 December 1961).
- Dorothy Alice Denman Stanley, MRGS, LRGP. For political and public services in Monmouthshire.
- John Stephens, Staff Officer, Ministry, of Labour and National Insurance for Northern Ireland.
- Thomas Stevenson, Senior Executive Officer, Ministry of Pensions and National Insurance.
- Louis George Stockdale, DCM. For services to Boys' Clubs in Sunderland, County Durham.
- Reginald Sutton Stokes, lately Technical Class Grade I, Admiralty.
- Sidney James Leonard Sykes, Senior Executive Officer, Ministry of Agriculture, Fisheries and Food.
- Cecil Leslie Symonds, Architectural and Civil Engineering Assistant, Grade I, Air Ministry.
- William Henry Tappenden, Manager, Drawing Offices, Armament Research and Development Establishment, War Office.
- John Henry Scott Target, Higher Executive Officer, Ministry of Housing and Local Government.
- Mona Cicely Tatham, lately assistant director of Music, Arts Council of Great Britain.
- Laura Babington Telford, Honorary Secretary, Women's Section, Athlone Branch, British Legion.
- Edith Winifred Templeton. For services to sport in Northern Ireland.
- Catherine Thomas, County Organiser for South Caernarvonshire, Women's Voluntary Service.
- Gwyn Ivor Thomas, Charge Nurse, Hensol Castle Hospital, Pontyclun, Glamorgan.
- Frederick Arthur Tomlinson. For political services in the East Midlands.
- John Philip Tredgett, Senior Auditor, Exchequer and Audit Department.
- Harold Claisse Trigg, lately Superintendent, General Post Office.
- James Leslie Truscott, Clerk of the Rules and Orders, Probate, Divorce and Admiralty Division, Supreme Court of Judicature.
- Kenneth Cyril Turnpenny, Technical Officer, Grade B, Ministry of Works.
- James William Upsdell, Contracts Manager, W. T. Copeland & Sons Ltd., Stoke-on-Trent.
- Norah Margaret Varley, Collector (Higher Grade), Board of Inland Revenue.
- Pauline Vogelpoel, Organising Secretary, Contemporary Art Society.
- Margaret Walker. For political services in Beeston.
- Thomas William Patrick Walker, Warden, Nash Court, Ludlow, National Association of Boys' Clubs Camping and Training Centre.
- Mary Cecil Wardle, JP, Member, Bagshot Rural District Council, Surrey.
- William Edward David Wardrop, DFM, Commercial Officer, Essex Sub-Area, Eastern Electricity Board.
- Leonard Samuel Warren, Purser, SS Canberra, Peninsular & Oriental Steam Navigation Company, London.
- Edward Stuart Washington, Senior History Master, Portsmouth Grammar School.
- Dorothy Margaret Watson. For political and public services in Dumfriesshire.
- Eric Hall Watson, Assistant Chief Constable, Warwickshire Constabulary.
- Ernest Mac West, JP. For public services in Littlehampton.
- Janet Johnston Wheelan, JP. For political services in West Lothian.
- Ethel Doris Wheeler, Personal Assistant to the Chairman of the Electricity Council.
- Alderman James Faulkner Whitehead, JP, Mayor of Appleby, Westmorland.
- Frances Dorothea Mackenzie Whyte, General Secretary, Scottish Council of Young Women's Christian Association of Great Britain.
- Herbert John Wicks, Higher Executive Officer, Admiralty.
- Frank Wild, Treasurer to Trent River Board.
- Leonard Wilkinson, lately Senior Executive Officer, Ministry of Pensions and National Insurance.
- Florence Jane Williams, Domiciliary Midwife, West London.
- Alfred Williamson. For political and public services in Manchester.
- Lilian Mabel Field Wincote, JP, Headmistress, Biddick Hall County Junior Mixed School, South Shields.
- Barbara Ramsden Winstanley (Mrs. Jacobson), Organiser, Derbyshire Education Committee Museum Service.
- Beulah Winter, lately Clerical Officer, Explosives Research and Development Establishment, Waltham Abbey, Ministry of Aviation.
- Jeanette Woods, Senior Probation Officer, South East Lancashire Probation Area.
- Charles Albert Woollard, Civil Engineer (Main Grade), Corporation of Trinity House.
- Ernest Clifford William Woolley, DSM, Clerical Officer, Ministry of Education.
- Bert Worrall, JP. For political services in Kettering.
- John Richard Wray, Chief Superintendent, Metropolitan Police.
- John Richard Wyatt, lately Senior Executive Officer, Ministry of Power.
- Andrew Thompson Young, JP, chairman, Castlederg Rural District Council.
- Harold John Stanley Young, Assistant General Manager, Port of Bristol Authority.
- Beatrice Winifred Arthur, Clerical Officer, Political Division, British Military Government, Berlin.
- Mary Lindsay Bertram, MB, Doctor in charge of Church Missionary Society Hospital, Omdurman.
- Genesius Cardona, Her Majesty's Vice-Consul, Douala.
- George Howard Chatfield, British subject resident in the United States of America.
- Nelly Aldegonda Clements, British Pro-Consul, Antwerp.
- William James Collins, BEM, Supervisory Operator/Technician, Headquarters, Hannover District, Northern Army Group.
- Captain Charles Henry Randolph Craker, British Vice-Consul, Dieppe.
- John Muir Donald, Deputy Head, Economic and Finance Department, British Military Government, Berlin.
- George Derek Green, British subject resident in France.
- Amy Mary Imlach, lately Assistant Information Officer, Her Majesty's Consulate-General, Chicago.
- William Vicars Johnson, lately Manager, Seamen's Institute, Algiers.
- Shaikh Mohammed Abdul Karim, British Pro-Consul, Basra.
- David McNaught Lockie, lately British Vice-Consul, Montreux.
- Michael Denys William McCann, lately Second Secretary (Commercial) and Vice-Consul, Her Majesty's Embassy, Havana.
- John Grant MacDonald, Third Secretary (Commercial) and Vice-Consul, Her Majesty's Embassy, Havana.
- Reverend Wilfred Ebor Markham, British Chaplain, Fernando Poo.
- Reginald Arthur Noakes, First Secretary and Consul, Her Majesty's Embassy, Copenhagen.
- Spiridion George Tsiantar, British Vice-Consul, Conakry.
- Nancy Robson de Fernandez-Victorio, First Assistant Mistress, British Institute School, Madrid.
- Percival Joseph Thomas Watkinson, lately British European Airways Representative, Yugoslavia.
- Francis Joseph White, British Consul, Norfolk, Virginia.
- Raymond Cathcart White, BEM, lately Communications Officer, Office of the United Kingdom Commissioner-General for South-East Asia, Singapore.
- Margaret Winstanley, British subject resident in Brazil.
- George Xuereb, British subject resident in Libya.
- Charles Augustus Francis Armbruster. For services to ex-servicemen, especially the limbless, in the State of South Australia.
- Agnes Dora Baker, of Bundaberg, State of Queensland. For social welfare services.
- Reverend Robert Barlow. For services to the British community in Bombay, India.
- Wilhemina Johanna Champion. For social welfare services in Southern Rhodesia.
- Samuel Clarkson, of Fremantle, State of Western Australia. For services to the Guide Dogs for the Blind movement.
- Fanny Cohen. For services to Education in the State of New South Wales.
- Samuel John Wilson Coles. For services to the British community in Pakistan.
- Jan Steyn de Beer, Director of Agriculture, Bechuanaland Protectorate.
- Jean Dennis, Mayor of the Borough of Wonthaggi, State of Victoria.
- Winifred Florence Dixie, of Maseru, Basutoland. For social welfare services.
- Aubrey Hilton Dyer, JP, Council Qerk, Municipality of Kentish, State of Tasmania.
- Alice Hazel Ferguson. For social welfare services in the State of New South Wales.
- David James Garland, formerly Chief Engineer, Department of Main Roads, State of Queensland.
- Roy Percy Godfrey. For services to the community in the State of New South Wales.
- Leonard Verdun Harvey, Officer in Charge of the Tuli Breeding Station, Department of Native Agriculture, Southern Rhodesia.
- Dora Joan Hopkins. For services to educational and charitable organisations in the State of Queensland.
- Councillor Jack Stanley Hore, Wodonga Shire Council, State of Victoria.
- Barbara Gillam-Hunt, President, Housewives Association, State of Victoria.
- Robert Alexander Hunter, MM, Mayor of Maryborough, State of Queensland.
- Derek Langston-Jones, Superintendent of Police, Federation of Malaya.
- James Douglas Kelly, Superintendent of Police, Federation of Malaya.
- Edward Thomas Kent. For services to the community in the State of New South Wales.
- Gwydir John Laycock, chairman, Bungil Shire Council, State of Queensland.
- Doreen Priscilla Low, of Rockdale, State of New South Wales. For social welfare services.
- Donald Peter Macdonald. For services to the community in the State of New South Wales.
- Ambrose Charles Majongwe, a farmer, of Southern Rhodesia.
- Percy Neville Frank Mansell. For services to cricket in Southern Rhodesia.
- Myra Audrey Martin, Headmistress of the International School, Accra, Ghana.
- James McFadden. For services to the sugar industry of the State of Queensland.
- Rosalind Millar. For voluntary services to the Victoria League.
- Thomas Moore, Chief Superintendent, British South Africa Police, Southern Rhodesia.
- Dayalji Bhimbhai Naik, of Bulawayo, Southern Rhodesia. For public services.
- Eleanor Margaret New, Matron, Church of England House of Mercy, Walkerville, State of South Australia.
- Marion Aimee Lyon Parish. For services to the British community in Eastern India.
- Frederick Albert Porter, of Northampton, State of Western Australia. For services to local government.
- Francis Michael Quealey, of Parramatta, State of New South Wales. For public services.
- Sister Mary Clare Richardson, Sister-in-Charge, Outpatients Department, St. Vincents' Hospital, Sydney, State of New South Wales.
- Charles Albert Van Rooyen, MRCS, LRCP, Medical Officer, Bechuanaland Protectorate.
- Gagomakwe Sechele. For social welfare services in the Bechuanaland Protectorate.
- Ellen Louise Stronge, Headmistress of the Ridge School, Accra, Ghana.
- Phyllis Margery Tewsley, MB, BS. For services to the community, especially in child welfare work, State of Victoria.
- Ella Wilkinson. For services to the Red Cross in Mafeterig, Basutoland.
- Lewis Grant Wilson. For public services in the State off Victoria.
- Fawkner Cameron Yeates, of Bairnsdale, State of Victoria. For services to the community.
- Carlton Ahwai, Establishment Officer, Federation of West Indies.
- Ivy Evelyn Allen Baxter, Creative Dance Choreographer, Jamaica Social Welfare Commission.
- Cecil Anthony Bellot. For public services in Dominica.
- Bartholomew Augustine Paul Branco. For public services in British Guiana.
- Stanley Byrne Brooks, Design Assistant, East African Railways and Harbours.
- Charles Stanley Burrowes, Drilling Superintendent, Public Works Department, British Guiana.
- Francis George Chapman, Chief Hospital Assistant, Sarawak.
- Nathan Reeds Chellahs, Assistant Executive Officer, Northern Rhodesia.
- Sipriani Chibwinja, Assistant Information Officer, Nyasaland.
- Phin Sz Chong, Senior Executive Officer, North Borneo.
- Father Martin Connolly. For public services in North Borneo.
- Richard Randolph Constantine, Senior Agricultural Supervisor, St. Helena.
- Edwin De Robillard. For public services in Mauritius.
- Maganlal Dahyabhai Desai, Associate Registrar, Court of Appeal for Eastern Africa.
- Harry Walter Ellis, lately Education Supply Officer, African Book Centre, Nyasaland.
- John Eric Hugh Orr-Ewing, MC, District Officer, Northern Rhodesia.
- Augustino Bruno Fernandes, Proof Reader, Government Press, Uganda.
- Gerald Henry Ferro, MVO, Assistant Secretary and Clerk of the Executive Council, Malta.
- Richard Henry Lane Francis, Inspecting Engineer, Crown Agents for Oversea Governments and Administrations.
- Guido Giovanni Gianetti, Registrar, University College of West Indies.
- Eunice Gibson. For public services in Barbados.
- Ella Goodban. For public services in Aden.
- Bisram Gopie. For social services in Trinidad.
- Herbert Thompson Grant. For public services in British Honduras.
- James Stanley Grant, Planning Supervisor, Statistical Department, East African Common Services Organisation.
- Charles Henry Samuel Greenaway, Head Teacher, Cavalla Hill School, Montserrat.
- Mabel Marjorie Haskell, Private Secretary to the Governor, Barbados.
- Reverend Alexander Sheldon Minshi Hellasi, Priest-in-Charge, St. Michael's Anglican Church, Buche, Kitwe, Northern Rhodesia.
- William Valentine Herbert. For public services in St. Christopher, Nevis and Anguilla.
- Harry Stanley Hibbard, Mains Engineer, Electricity Department, Aden.
- Phyllis Douglas Hosten. For public services in Grenada.
- Joseph Huntingford, Public Works Engineer, Malta.
- Filip Ingutia. For public services in Kenya.
- Peter Jong Kuet Siong. For public services in Sarawak.
- Malik Rahemtulla Kassim. For public services in Uganda.
- Matteo Kiragu, President, Nyeri African Appeal Court, Kenya.
- Barbara Averelle Lever. For public services in Northern Rhodesia.
- Margaret Rose Luke, Personal Secretary to the Governor, Uganda.
- Ma Yi-ying. For social services in Hong Kong.
- Anne Grace Mansell. For public services in Fiji.
- Noel Auguste Michel, Deputy Superintendent of Police, Seychelles.
- Lawrence John Morello, lately Administrative Assistant, Port Department, Gibraltar.
- William Balwana Mwangu, Secretary of Works, Busoga African Local Government, Uganda.
- Senior Chief Musa Nyandusi, BEM, Chief of Nyaribari Location of Kisii District, Kenya.
- Vasangray Marji Pancholi, lately Establishment Officer, East African Posts and Telecommunications Administration.
- William Arthur Peel, Principal Auditor, Seychelles.
- Simpson Calfred Penn. For public services in the Bahamas.
- Ali Qassim, Junior Assistant Adviser, Aden.
- Salvador Ramirez, Superintendent of City Council Engineering Workshops, Gibraltar.
- Mair Olwena Rees, Health Sister, Sarawak.
- Griselda dos Remedios, Matron, Prisons Department (Hospital), Hong Kong.
- Mary Elizabeth Roache. For public services in Kenya.
- Florella Swanston Samuel. For services to the blind in Trinidad.
- Tulsi Ram Sharma. For services to trade unionism in Fiji.
- Harbans Singh. For services to sport in Kenya.
- Ignatius Singh, lately Chief Technician, Laboratory Service, Ministry of Labour, Health and Housing, British Guiana.
- William Millard Spencer, Agricultural Officer, Kenya.
- John Ingham Stafford, MB, ChB, Medical Officer, Uganda.
- Christopher Strudwick, Property Valuer, Mauritius.
- Te Tabunawati Takoa, Assistant Administrative Officer, Gilbert and Ellice Islands.
- John Terence Twohey, Goods Agent, East African Railways and Harbours.
- Robert Godwin Beresford Verity. For services to art and music in Jamaica.
- James Aloysius Waight, Director of Lands and Surveys, British Honduras.
- John Theophilus Wint, Agricultural Instructor, Bahamas.
- John Makin, Regional Director of the British Council, Moshi, Tanganyika.
- Titus Todd Munthali, Labour Officer, Tanganyika.
- Francis Henry Pridham, Forester, Tanganyika.
- Avis Irene Richardson, Headmistress, Girls' Middle School, Mvumi, Tanganyika.
- Shaaban Robert. For services in Tanganyika to Swahili literature.
- Ramanlal Bhurabhaii Shah, Assistant Superintendent, of Prisons, Tanganyika.

=== Order of the Companions of Honour (CH) ===
- Very Reverend Walter Robert Matthews, KCVO, Dean of St. Paul's Cathedral.

=== British Empire Medal (BEM) ===
Military Division

Royal Navy

- Chief Radio Supervisor Cecil Ernest Weston Adlam, DSM, D/J.12961.
- Engine Room Artificer First Class Joseph Aitchison, C/M.944512.
- Chief Engine Room Artificer Cecil Walter Ashworth, D/MX.51328.
- Chief Petty Officer Cook (S) Claude Henry Bell, P/MX.52864.
- Chief Petty Officer Clarence John Bruce Chapman, P/JX.147488.
- Chief Wren Regulating Annie Chasty, U.D./W.I., Women's Royal Naval Reserve.
- Chief Airman Frederick Edwin Clarke, L/FX.670426.
- Chief Petty Officer Writer Raymond Charles William Durrant, P/MX.60880.
- Chief Petty Officer James Noel Edwards, D/JX.156128.
- Chief Electrician Wilfred Ernest Farmery, P/MX.766427.
- Chief Petty Officer Writer Thomas James Gascoigne, D/MX.58727.
- Chief Radio Electrician Colin Horace Headdon D/MX.799811.
- Chief Wren Cook (S) Doris Holland, 24634, Women's Royal Naval Service.
- Corporal Roy Douglas Horsburgh, RM.11807, Royal Marines.
- Chief Communications Yeoman Reginald Hubbard, C/JX.141084.
- Engine Room Artificer First Class Jack Eric Hunt, Q991642, Royal Naval Reserve.
- Colour Sergeant George Bradford Jackson, Ch/X.1519, Royal Marines.
- Chief Radio Supervisor Jack William Ernest Kelson, P/JX.142883.
- Chief Petty Officer Sydney Lister, L/FX.670433.
- Shipwright Artificer First Class Terence Edward Madden, P/MX.117300.
- Chief Petty Officer (G.I.) Reginald Eric Mayes, P/JX.154599.
- Sick Berth Chief Petty Officer Mwadham, s/o Godoro, Royal East African Navy.
- Chief Petty Officer (G.I.) Peter William Richardson, P/JX.163612.
- Chief Petty Officer Joseph Saliba, E/JX.146453.
- Chief Ordnance Artificer Donald Alfred Stonebridge, P/MX.60658.
- Chief Engine Room Artificer Eric Bernard Tuson, P/MX.57637.
- Quartermaster Sergeant (C) Alan Ware Ply/X.4236, Royal Marines.
- Colour Sergeant Robert Wheeler, Ply/X.3462, Royal Marines.
- Chief Engineering Mechanic Alexander Gordon Wilson, J.988738, Royal Naval Reserve.
- Chief Electrician Reginald John Young, D/MX.892368.

Army

- 3599156 Sergeant Lawrence Abraham, Queen's Own Hussars, Royall Armoured Corps.
- W/327305 Staff-Sergeant Joan Beard, Women's Royal Army Corps.
- 2653528 Sergeant John Brobbel, Coldstream Guards.
- 22786508 Staff-Sergeant Thomas James Bunting, Royal Regiment of Artillery, Territorial Army.
- 22246103 Staff-Sergeant Eric John Edward Bushell, Corps of Royal Electrical and Mechanical Engineers.
- 14401884 Sergeant Richard Carlin, Royal Inniskilling Fusiliers.
- 1906111 Staff-Sergeant Horace Edward Cooke, Corps of Royal Engineers.
- 7263047 Warrant Officer Class II (acting) Edwin David Cross, Royal Army Medical Corps.
- 22511435 Staff-Sergeant Douglas William Dinsdale, King's Own Royal Border Regiment.
- 1882675 Staff-Sergeant (Artillery Clerk) James Stewart Dunlop, Royal Regiment of Artillery, Territorial Army.
- 22271217 Sergeant James William Edwards, King's Own Royal Border Regiment.
- 22818854 Sergeant (acting) Frederick Charles Farley, Corps of Royal Engineers.
- 4123528 Staff-Sergeant Bernard Goodwin, Cheshire Regiment.
- 734339 Staff-Sergeant (local) (Farrier) Joseph Havercamp, Royal Regiment of Artillery.
- 22090317 Staff-Sergeant Bryan Hirst, Royal Army Pay Corps.
- 22523027 Sergeant Geoffrey Thomas Hockridge, Royal Army Pay Corps.
- 7961672 Staff-Sergeant (acting) George Samuel Hogg, Royal Army Dental Corps.
- 19054212 Staff-Sergeant Richard Houghton, Corps of Royal Electrical and Mechanical Engineers.
- T/322037 Sergeant (local Band Sergeant-Major) Eric Hurst, Royal Army Service Corps.
- 22953654 Sergeant (acting) David Maurice Nicholas Jones, Corps of Royal Military Police.
- 14487546 Sergeant Christopher Thomas Lunt, Army Physical Training Corps.
- 6211953 Colour Sergeant (acting) Herbert Ambrose Males, Middlesex Regiment (Duke of Cambridge's Own).
- 2034842 Staff-Sergeant Douglas Ivor Mann, Corps of Royal Engineers.
- 6288738 Staff-Sergeant Richard Andrew Middleditch, Army Physical Training Corps.
- B.9458 Warrant Officer Platoon Commander Isaia Mwambora, King's African Rifles.
- T/22533183 Staff-Sergeant (acting) Tony Frederick Nicholas, Royal Army Service Corps.
- 7521053 Staff-Sergeant Arthur Oddy, Royal Army Medical Corps.
- S/152768 Staff-Sergeant Sidney Walter John Perkins, Royal Army Service Corps.
- 22253871 Staff-Sergeant (acting) John Arthur Peter Potter, Royal Pioneer Corps.
- 22221600 Corporal Sydney John Price, Honourable Artillery Company (Infantry), Territorial Army.
- 22557372 Colour-Sergeant Joseph Francis Rand, Royal Hampshire Regiment, Territorial Army.
- 22809481 Staff-Sergeant James Reardon, Royal Regiment of Artillery, Territorial Army.
- 1066460 Staff-Sergeant (local Warrant Officer Class I) James Benjamin Reidy, Royal Regiment of Artillery.
- T/4423029 Staff-Sergeant David Brown Rennie, Royal Army Service Corps.
- LS/3523358 Sergeant Joseph Rogers, Royal Regiment of Artillery.
- W/6512 Warrant Officer Class II (acting) Barbara Joyce Searle, Women's Royal Army Corps.
- 6402157 Sergeant Walter Stanley John Smith, Royal Army Pay Corps.
- 2372346 Warrant Officer Class II (acting) Robert Hogg Stein, Royal Corps of Signals.
- 2715601 Sergeant James Tymon, Irish Guards.
- 22240880 Sergeant Reginald Albert Sidney Wells, Corps of Royal Military Police.
- 6287097 Staff-Sergeant (acting) (Artillery Clerk) Charles John Winch, Royial Regiment of Artillery.
- 22236313 Sergeant Douglas Havel Wynne, Corps of Royal Engineers.
- 14328663 Sergeant Frederick Young, Royal Army Veterinary Corps.

Royal Air Force

- 616894 Flight Sergeant Bernard Frank Authers.
- 533236 Flight Sergeant George Beck.
- 4026945 Flight Sergeant William Cameron, Royal Air Force Regiment.
- 527300 Flight Sergeant James Andrew Connolly.
- 880117 Flight Sergeant Kathleen Helen Mayne Coombes, Women's Royal Air Force.
- 565531 Flight Sergeant (now Warrant Officer) John Geoffrey Farmer.
- 3115897 Flight Sergeant Raymond Alfred Fudge.
- 953640 Flight Sergeant Charles Reynell Mohun.
- 574305 Flight Sergeant Eric Hinton Prior.
- 525012 Flight Sergeant Kenneth Goodfield Richards, DFM.
- 1129584 Flight Sergeant William John Smyth.
- 572946 Flight Sergeant Frederick Barrie Stenhouse.
- 524326 Flight Sergeant Arthur George Walmsley.
- 520483 Flight Sergeant Harold Albert Winston Walters.
- 2034904 Acting Flight Sergeant Winifred Elizabeth Thorns, Women's Royal Air Force.
- 575658 Chief Technician (now Master Technician) Gordon Gower Bannell.
- 654379 Chief Technician Thomas Patrick Evans.
- 579256 Chief Technician Donald Barnett Fletcher.
- 582172 Chief Technician Stanley William Full.
- 577929 Chief Technician (now Master Technician) Frederick John Harrison.
- 553347 Chief Technician James Matthew Thorn Ormerod.
- 4025491 Chief Technician Leonard Porter.
- 575623 Chief Technician Robert Norman Spain.
- 784891 Chief Technician Michal Staszewski.
- 534992 Chief Technician Sydney Wilson.
- 1040778 Sergeant Clarence Rowland Berridge.
- 4005741 Sergeant James Crowley.
- 2390628 Sergeant David Blyth Dorward.
- 2336390 Sergeant Leslie George Dungey.
- 577615 Sergeant Thomas Eggleston.
- 4037512 Sergeant Philip Edward Fettis.
- 925003 Sergeant Peter Godden.
- 642183 Sergeant Fred Greensides.
- 1139297 Sergeant Norman Richard Hudson, Royal Air Force Regiment.
- 3005008 Sergeant Kenneth William Alfred Vassar Kilby.
- 3044815 Sergeant John Rodney Lees, GM.
- 613222 Sergeant Hubert McDonald.
- 4019126 Sergeant Clifford Keith Pickering.
- 617895 Sergeant John James Plews.
- 578854 Sergeant John Herbert Lewin Roe.
- 4014435 Sergeant Hubert George Thorne.
- 2455051 Sergeant Maurice George Weller.
- 592384 Sergeant Thomas Malcolm Wilson.
- 3520473 Corporal Technician Douglas Leslie Hall.

Civil Division
United Kingdom

- John Ball, Skilled Fitter, English Electric Co. Ltd., Preston.
- John Bannister, Sergeant, Metropolitan Police. (London N.17).
- Clifford Archer Barber, Principal Photographer, Royal Naval School of Photography. (Bognor Regis).
- George Barnaby, Donkeyman, SS Orsova, P. & O. Orient Lines, (Orient Line). (London S.E.6).
- Robert Newton Bates, Station Officer, Kent Fire Brigade. (Sevenpaks).
- John Williams Bayliss, Bakehouse Manager, Messrs. Walls & Sons, Ltd. (Greenford, Middlesex).
- Ellen Beverley, lately Telephone Supervisor, Manchester City Police. (Manchester).
- Dorothy Bonvoisin, Collector, Street Savings Groups, Barnstaple, Devon.
- Carmel Borg, Grade "A" Clerk, Ordnance Depot, War Office, Malta.
- Harry Bott, Works Trainer, Daniel Doncaster & Sons Ltd., Blaenavon.
- Edward Percy Bourne, Foreman and Skipper, Shellfish Research Unit, Ministry of Agriculture, Fisheries and Food. (Burnham-on-Crouch, Essex).
- Edith Alice Bradbury, Collector, Street Savings Group, Gainsborough, Lincolnshire.
- Louisa Bradshaw, Collector, Street Sayings Group, Belfast.
- Henry Charles Semark Bramble, Clerk of Works (Electrical), War Office, Aldershot.
- Elizabeth Brennan, Deputy Canteen Manageress, Windscale Works, United Kingdom Atomic Energy Authority. (Cleator Moor, Cumberland).
- Constance Marion Simpson Bruce, Centre Organiser, Bingley, Yorkshire, West Riding, Women's Voluntary Service.
- Maurice Richard Butler, Plant Attendant, East Greenwich Works, South Eastern Gas Board. (London SE.13).
- William Cadenhead, Officer, Dundee West Company (British Railways), St. Andrew's Ambulance Association. (Dundee).
- Charlie Calloway, Sub-Postmaster, Arreton, Newport, Isle of Wight.
- Lilian Ruby Campbell, Collector, Street Savings Groups, Penygraig, Rhondda.
- William Arthur Carr, Boatswain, MV Kirkham Abbey, British Transport Commission, Associated Humber Lines Ltd. (Goole).
- Robert Alfred Casey, Engineering Technical Grade II, Royal Radar Establishment, Malvern, Ministry of Aviation.
- Alfred Ratcliffe Chadwick, Superintending Overseas Fitter, Dobson & Barlow Ltd. (Bolton).
- Harry Francis Clifton, Boatswain, Ocean Weather Ship Weather Reporter, Air Ministry. (London SW.14).
- Philip James Collier, Craftsman, National Museum of Wales. (Cardiff).
- Kathleen Gertrude Connor, Woman Observer, Post No. F/1, No. 11 Group, Royal Observer Corps. (Truro, Cornwall).
- John James Cook, First Hand Steel Melter, Brown, Lenox & Co. Ltd., Pontypridd.
- Henry Court, Surveyor, Ministry of Agriculture, Fisheries and Food. (Guildford, Surrey).
- George Alfred Coventry, Office Keeper, Grade II, National Assistance Board. (London E.2).
- Edward John Cox, Civilian Warrant Officer, No. 359 (Bexleyheath) Squadron, Air Training Corps. (Dartford, Kent).
- Allen Crookes, Foreman Electrician, Samuel Osborn & Ltd. (Sheffield).
- Anthony Cunningham, Overman, Bold Colliery, North Western Division, National Coal Board. (St Helens).
- Catherine Dempster, Collector, Street Savings Groups, Badenoch District, Invernessshire.
- Simeon Dimmock, Labourer, Royal Air Force, Upwood. (Ramsey).
- John William Dixon, lately Grade 1 Officer, Branch D, Foreign Office. (Isle of Man).
- George Benjamin Dover, Assistant Preventive Officer, London Waterguard, Board of Customs and Excise. (Newbury Park, Essex).
- Charles Frederick Driver, Engineer, Davey, Paxman & Co. Ltd., Colchester.
- Norman Drewett Duell, Collector, Street Savings Groups, Feltham.
- Arthur Duncan, Sub-District Commandant, Ulster Special Constabulary. (Brookeborough).
- Margaret Dunlop, Collector, Street Savings Group, Hyde, Cheshire.
- Archibald Ernest England, Master, Light Vessel Service, Harwich District, Corporation of Trinity House. (Romford).
- Ernest Edward Fancy, Forester, Grade I, Forestry Commission. (Wareham, Dorset).
- John Cyril Fitchett, Machinist and Setter-up, Marshall Sons & Co. Ltd., Gainsborough, Lincolnshire.
- John Edwin Fradley, District Deputy, Hem Heath Colliery, West Midlands Division, National Coal Board. (Stoke-on-Trent).
- Albert Edward Fricker, Foreman of Manufacture, Royal Naval Propellant Factory, Caerwent. (Poole, Dorset).
- Nellie Friend, Production Planner, Wireless Telephone Co. Ltd., Sheffield.
- William Thomas George, Fire Marshal, Fawley Refinery, Esso Petroleum Co. Ltd.
- Rose Emma Elizabeth Goldsworthy, Telephone Switchboard Operator Supervisor, National Physical Laboratory, Department of Scientific and Industrial Research. (Kingston Hill, Surrey).
- Reginald George Henry Gough, Collector, Street Savings Group, Great Yarmouth.
- David Graham, JP, Goods Checker, Liverpool Road, Manchester, British Railways.
- Alison Lorraine Grant, Commandant, County of Dunbarton Branch, British Red Cross Society. (Bearsden).
- Harold Henry Hackett, Temporary Assistant Fatstock Officer, Ministry of Agriculture, Fisheries and Food. (Wolverhampton).
- John William Hartley, Overman, South Kirkby Colliery, North Eastern Division, National Coal Board. (Pontefract).
- George Hawkins, Permanent Way Inspector, Special Category "B", Bristol, British Railways.
- Harold William Charles Helley, Instructor, Civil Defence Corps, Gloucestershire Division. (Bristol).
- Arthur Helliwell, Handyman, Coal and Coke Testing (Class I), Firkshall, Bradford Division, North Eastern Gas Board.
- George Edmund Holden, Research and Development Craftsman, Armament Research and Development Establishment, War Office. (Horsham, Sussex).
- Francis Herbert Holland, Commandant, Detachment WL/59 (Huyton) West Lancashire Branch, British Red Cross Society. (Liverpool).
- Ernest Edward Holloway, Chargehand II, Weapons Group, United Kingdom Atomic Energy Authority. (Basingstoke).
- Ethel Hopwood, Senior Chief Supervisor, Salford, General Post Office. (Manchester).
- Oliver Otto Hornby, Process Worker, Imperial Chemical Industries, Ltd. (Billingham).
- William James Horne, General Foreman, Wellingborouigh Undertaking, East Midlands Gas Board.
- John Hunter, Pipe Band Instructor, Boys' Brigade, Inverness.
- Edmond Joseph Jackson, Manager, NAAFI Canteen, HMS Meon.
- Harry Jeans, Sergeant Major Instructor, 6th (Glos.) Cadet Regiment. (Bristol).
- Hebe Jenkinson, Collector, Westmoor Street Savings Group, Rawdon, near Leeds.
- Richard George Jewell, Depot Superintendent, Plymouth Parcels Depot, Western Division, British Road Services.
- Frederick Jode, Staff Instructor, St. John's School Combined Cadet Force, Leatherhead.
- Albert Edward John, Head Land Warden, RAC Ranges, Castlemartin, War Office. (Pembroke).
- Reginald Johnson, Supervisor (Telephones), Bedford, General Post Office.
- Islwyn Jones, Deputy, Seven Sisters Colliery, South Western Division, National Coal Board.
- Robert Thomas King, Head Foreman Plumber, Harland & Wolff Ltd., Belfast.
- Heung Lun Lam, Local Clerk Grade "A", Admiralty, Hong Kong.
- James William Lambert, Leading Illustrator, Air Ministry. (London, N.22).
- Mavis Sinclair Lawrey. For social and charitable services in Penzance and district.
- William James Leach, Chargehand, Ministry of Works. (London, SE.23).
- Arthur George Lee, Local Chargeman of Shipwrights, Admiralty. (Plymouth).
- Frederick Lovett, Senior Medical Room Attendant, Crookhall Colliery, Durham Division, National Coal Board.
- John Gordon Lyon, Works Technical Officer III, Torry Research Station, Department of Scientific and Industrial Research. (Aberdeen).
- William McAdam, Adviser on Welding, Brown Bros. & Co. Ltd., Edinburgh.
- Daniel McAlinden, Inspector, Telephone Manager's Office, Salford, General Post Office. (Stockport).
- Robert McCormick, Superintendent, Pithead Baths, Fauldhead Colliery, Scottish Division, National Coal Board. (Kirkconnel).
- Hamish MacInnes, Mountain Rescue Worker, Glencoe, Argyll.
- Catherine Mary Mackenzie, Woman Chief Inspector, Surrey Constabulary. (Guildford).
- John William Mackenzie, Bar Officer, Sheriff Court, Edinburgh.
- Alexander McLean, Foreman Boiler Cleaner, South of Scotland Electricity Board. (Paisley).
- Eugene Patrick McManus, Cable Foreman, HMTS Monarch, General Post Office. (Rochester, Kent).
- Margaret McMinn, Youth Leader, Thorndyke Street Girls' Club, Belfast.
- Roderick Macrae, Head Inspector and Stamper, Harris Tweed Association, Ltd., Inverness. (Stornoway).
- William Manson, Postman, Head Post Office, Thurso, Caithness.
- David James Anderson Massie, Civilian Warrant Officer, No. 1295 (Peterhead) Squadron, Air Training Corps. (Peterhead).
- Ivor Fred Mold, Leader, Bridgnorth Boys' Club, Shropshire.
- Edward George Moore, Fitter Shipkeeper, Solent Division, RNVR, Admiralty. (Chandler's Ford, Hampshire).
- Joseph Morrison, lately Attendant to the Lord Mayor of Belfast.
- Robert Nicol Muir, Station Officer, South Western Scotland Area Fire Brigade. (Kilmarnock).
- Mary Niblock, Member, Women's Voluntary Service, Prestwick.
- Edward Tomkin Nicholls, Foreman, 6 Command Workshop, War Office. (Alresford, Essex).
- William Nicholls, Press Tool Setter, Stampings Alliance Ltd. (Birmingham).
- Joseph Noden, Installation Inspector, North Western Electricity Board. (Ashton-under-Lyne).
- Nora O'Brien, Stewardess, SS Andes, Royal Mail Lines Ltd. (Wirral, Cheshire).
- Ann Oliphant, Centre Organiser, Bridport, Women's Voluntary Service.
- George Oughton, Linesman, Bishop Auckland District, North Eastern Electricity Board.
- Patrick James Perry, Chief Officer, Class I, HM Prison, Wormwood Scrubs. (London, W.12).
- Richard Henry Pettit, Manager, Buffer Depot Group 339, Ministry of Agriculture, Fisheries and Food. (Hildenborough).
- George Henry James Pilliner, Head Furnaceman and Consultant Furnaceman, Whitehead Iron & Steel Co. Ltd. (Newport, Monmouthshire).
- Percival Victor Pooley, Assistant Divisional Officer, Wolverhampton Fire Brigade.
- George Alfred Charles Pyne, Civilian Sports and Physical Training Instructor, Dartford Sea Cadet Corps.
- William Henry Quayle, Caulker-Burner, Vickers-Armstrongs (Shipbuilders) Ltd., Barrow-in-Furness.
- Philip Quinn, Machinist Tradesman, Leyland Motors Ltd. (Chorley).
- George Randle, Temporary Chief Inspector, Head Post Office, St. Petersgate, Stockport, Cheshire.
- Walter James Reeve, Sub-Postmaster, Woodhouse Lane Sub-Post Office, Leeds.
- Samuel Reid, lately Town Foreman, Donaghadee, County Down.
- Harry Rhodes, Underground Contractor, Bolsover Colliery, East Midlands Division, National Coal Board.
- David Evans Richards, R. & D. Craftsman (Special) Chargehand, Royal Aircraft Establishment, Aberporth. (Newcastle Emlyn).
- Frederick William Maurice Richards, Technical Officer, Long Distance Area, General Post Office. (London, E.17).
- Walter Dundonald Symon Richards, Foreman, Serck Radiators, Ltd., Birmingham.
- Ellen Doris Riley, Chief Supervisor, Vale Telephone Exchange, Stoke-on-Trent.
- Alexander Robinson, Sergeant, Royal Ulster Constabulary. (Enniskillen).
- Elmer John Rose, Bailiff and Pinder to the Court Leet of the Manor of Laxton, Nottinghamshire.
- Ernest Sidney Ruff, Radio Supervisor, Government Communications Headquarters, Foreign Office. (Shaftesbury, Dorset).
- Amy Annie Russell, Sub-Postmistress, Long Itchington, Rugby.
- Alfado Alexander Scott, Clerk, Grade I, Caribbean Area, War Office. (Jamaica).
- Herbert Henry Scott, Inspector, Head Post Office, Croydon.
- James Scott, Manager, Glenochar Farm, Crawford, Lanarkshire.
- Gordon Charles Simms, Chargehand Fitter "A", Royal Ordnance Factory, Nottingham, War Office.
- George Simons, Telephone Mechanic, General Post Office, Edinburgh.
- Richard Cowlishaw Smedley, Station Officer, Derbyshire Fire Brigade. (Ashbourne).
- Frederick Francis Festubert Smith, Foreman of Trades (Engines), No. 5 Maintenance Unit, Royal Air Force, Kemble. (Cirencester).
- Matthew Smith, Chargehand Labourer, Aircraft Torpedo Development Unit, Ministry of Aviation. (Helston, Cornwall).
- George Smithson, Senior Marine Survey Assistant, Hull, Ministry of Transport.
- Albert Frank Sparks, Chief Inspector of Postmen (Plymouth), General Post Office.
- Horace Mark Garrett Stagey, Draughtsman, Ministry of Agriculture, Fisheries and Food. (Southampton).
- Bernard Cyril Andrews Stone, Technical Officer, Brighton Telephone Area, General Post Office. (Lewes).
- Samuel Strickfuss, Refrigerating Greaser, MV Northumberland, New Zealand Shipping Co. Ltd. (London, E.16).
- John Sutherland, Established Fitter, Royal Naval Torpedo Factory, Alexandria, Dunbartonshire.
- Edgar Henry Tatnall, Instructor, Princess Christian Homes and Training Centre, Knaphill, Brookwood. (Surrey).
- Abraham James Henry Thompson, Building Supervisor, New Cross General Hospital. (Tenterden, Kent).
- John Thompson, Chief Observer, Post K/3, No. 22 Group, Royal Observer Corps. (Carlisle).
- Cyril Freeman Tolliday, Engineering Technical, Grade II, Royal Aircraft Establishment, Farnborough. (Farnham, Surrey).
- Beatrice Ellen Tonks, Home Help, West Bromwich City Borough Council.
- John Trees, Foreman Apprentice Instructor, Bold Power Station, North West, Merseyside and North Wales Region, Central Electricity Generating Board. (Salford).
- Charles Wolfred Tricker, Deputy Station Superintendent, Ipswich Power Station, Eastern Division, Central Electricity Generating Board.
- Wilfrid Turner, Assistant Chief Warden, Civil Defence Corps, Yorkshire West Riding Division. (Thongsforidge).
- Thomas Henry Varey, Caretaker, West Lancashire Territorial & Auxiliary Forces Association, Liverpool.
- Herbert James Vizard, Supervising Instructor, Grade I, No. 12 School of Technical Training, RAF, Melksham.
- Thomas Ward, Fore-Overman, Vane Tempest Colliery, Durham Division, National Coal Board. (Seaham).
- William Noel Warren, Inspector, Metropolitan Police. (London, SE.11).
- George Alexander Whillans, Mountain Rescue Worker, Glencoe (Constable, Argyll County Police).
- Alfred Edward Whincup, Foreman Shipwright, Manchester Dry Docks Co. Ltd. (Salford).
- Thomas Alexander Wilkins, Fitter Afloat, Vosper Ltd., Portsmouth. (Portchester).
- David Williams, Foreman, Gwynedd River Board, Denbighshire.
- Edward John Lawrence Williamson, Postman, Higher Grade, Head Post Office, Bromley, Kent.
- Thomas Richard Yates, Fitter, Vickers-Armstrongs (Engineers) Ltd., Newcastle upon Tyne. (Gateshead).

State of New South Wales

- Amy Isobel Maidon Myers, Seeds Officer, Department of Agriculture, New South Wales.
- Harold Sidney Kay-Spratley, Chief Messenger, Department of Agriculture, New South Wales.

State of South Australia

- David Rasmus Nelson, Foreman, Adelaide Rope & Nail Co. Ltd., Hindmarsh.
- Donald William Rawson, Sergeant, 1st Grade, South Australian Police.

Federation of Malaya

- William Edward Grant, lately Police Lieutenant, Royal Federation of Malaya Police.
- Charles William Landon, lately Chief Officer, Grade II Prisons Department, Federation of Malaya.
- Cyril William Pavey, Police Lieutenant, Royal Federation of Malaya Police.
- Frank Smith, Police Lieutenant, Royal Federation of Malaya Police.

Southern Rhodesia

- Chaitezwi, African First Sergeant, British South African Police.
- Dick Vuyanyi, Butler, Government House, Salisbury.

Basutoland

- Jemlina Moshabesha, lately Staff Nurse, Government Service, Basutoland.

Overseas Territories

- Ivan Hugh Gordon Bayley, Chief Officer, HM Prisons, Barbados.
- Julius Luke Webster, Station Foreman, Belle Pumping Station, Waterworks Department, Barbados.
- Rozina Elizabeth Read, Senior Prison Matron, Prisons Department, British Guiana.
- Abdalla Mfaume Kilimo, Sub-Permanent Way Inspector, Grade VI, East African Railways and Harbours Administration.
- Chiaranjit Singh, Harbour Foreman, Port of Mombasa, East African Railways and Harbours Administration.
- Arthur Frank Valentine, Foreman, Marine Hull Repair Section, Royal New Zealand Air Force Station, Lauthala Bay, Suva, Fiji.
- Wah Wong, Foreman, Class II, Permanent Way Department, Hong Kong.
- Enos Milverton Pottinger, Chief Operator, Heavy Mechanical Units, Public Works Department, Jamaica.
- Haji Moksin bin Chuchu, Native Chief, Badas Damit Area, North Borneo.
- Antlhony Palani Robert, Technician, Malaria Control Project, Keningau, North Borneo.
- James Kekelwa Nawa, Head District Messenger, Mongu-Lealui District, Northern Rhodesia.
- Douglas Ernest Leo, Station Foreman, Agricultural and Forestry Department, St. Helena.
- Anastasie Bastien, lately Head Teacher, La Rossource Combined School, St. Lucia.
- Alphonse Underwood, Head Blacksmith, Public Works Department, Seychelles.
- Balwant Singh Bahit, Lines Foreman, Electricity Board, Uganda.
- Salim Malelemba, Sergeant Major (Police), Zanzibar.
- Hamed Seleman Mahinda, Game Assistant, Tanganyika.

=== Royal Victorian Medal (RVM) ===
In Silver

- Alfred James Amos.
- John Cleverly.
- Alice Helen Crancher.
- Chief Petty Officer Ivan Robert James Hunter, D/JX. 795612.
- Yeoman Bed Goer Fred Cliffe Keightley, MC, Her Majesty's Bodyguard of the Yeomen of the Guard.
- Sick Berth Petty Officer Alfred William Mason, P/MX. 51912.
- Marie Marguerite Milbourn.
- Isabella Mitchell.
- Ray Cameron Montgomery.
- Percy Southwell.
- Reah Lucy Stone.
- 363298 Chief Technician Norman Frank West, Royal Air Force.

=== Royal Red Cross (RRC) ===
- Lieutenant-Colonel Charlotte Molly McMinn, ARRC, (206314), Queen Alexandra's Royal Army Nursing Corps.

==== Associate of the Royal Red Cross (ARRC) ====
- Sheila Mary Houston, Superintending Sister, Queen Alexandra's Royal Naval Nursing Service.
- Enid Maude Roberts, Head Naval Nursing Auxiliary.
- Lieutenant-Colonel Agnes Mary Barnett (209764), Queen Alexandra's Royal Army Nursing Corps, Territorial Army.
- Major Jane McLoughlin (345310), Queen Alexandra's Royal Army Nursing Corps.
- Major Mary Miriam Ryan (206425), Queen Alexandra's Royal Army Nursing Corps.
- Squadron Officer Sybil Esther Woods (405825), Princess Mary's Royal Air Force Nursing Service.
- Flight Officer Mairie McDonald Stalker (407106), Princess Mary's Royal Air Force Nursing Service.

=== Air Force Cross (AFC) ===
Royal Air Force

- Wing Commander Victor Ronald Llewelyn Evans (53249).
- Acting Wing Commander Hubert Desmond Hall (200632).
- Squadron Leader Michael Gordon Beavis (3110153).
- Squadron Leader Michael Granville Bradley (2600023).
- Squadron Leader Leonard Donald Brown (155384).
- Squadron Leader David Edward Broadbeht Dowling (607139).
- Squadron Leader John Leslie Price (607120).
- Flight Lieutenant George Philip Black (3130226).
- Flight Lieutenant Arthur Ernest Herbert (576248).
- Flight Lieutenant Jack Mellor (154815).
- Flight Lieutenant Robert Vernon Anthony Munro, (584210).
- Flight Lieutenant William Frederick James Stevens, DFC, (146924).
- Master Pilot Vernon Wilkinson Brown, AFM, (544868).
- Master Pilot George Frederick Watts (1600430).

==== Bar to Air Force Cross ====
Royal Air Force

- Wing Commander Desmond Fitzalan Monteagle Browne, AFC, (163501).
- Squadron Leader Newton Francis Harrison, DSO, AFC, (502184).

=== Queen's Commendation for Valuable Service in the Air ===
Royal Air Force

- Wing Commander Charles Cranston Calder, DSO, DFC, (62699).
- Wing Commander Graham Ian Chapman, AFC, (174421).
- Wing Commander Robin Anderson Slater, DFC, AFC, (151830).
- Squadron Leader Jan Badeni (500303).
- Squadron Leader Douglas Barry Barfoot (179443).
- Squadron Leader Robert John Carson (150372).
- Squadron Leader Anthony John Clarke (1333344).
- Squadron Leader Michael Spencer Goodfellow (4043437).
- Flight Lieutenant John Leslie Bates (582949).
- Flight Lieutenant Leslie Birrell Brown, AFM, (656363).
- Flight Lieutenant John Rutherford Campbell (177273).
- Flight Lieutenant Harry Charles Frederick Clerbaut (1299850).
- Flight Lieutenant Ronald Montgomery Crawford (193465).
- Flight Lieutenant Christopher Horn (170198).
- Flight Lieutenant Wallace Hutchinson Ward Norton (3510704).
- Flight Lieutenant John Victor Radice (3507289).
- Flight Lieutenant Robert Alexander Smith (1399181).
- Flight Lieutenant Stanley Sollitt, AFC, (1081071).
- Flight Lieutenant Frederick Arthur Trowern (4058982).
- Flight Lieutenant Cyril Hector Whitburn (57100).
- Flight Lieutenant John Riley Whittam (607454).
- Flight Lieutenant Reginald George Wilding, AFM, (1181063).
- Flying Officer Arthur Halliday Elliot (189569).
- Flying Officer Arthur John Sedgwick James (4174358).
- Flying Officer John Frederick Knight (3088191).
- Master Pilot Thomas Vivian Owen (1037400).
- 4041167 Flight Sergeant Archibald Hood.
- 4060872 Sergeant Gordon Cyril Smith.

Overseas Territory

- Christopher Treen, Superintendent of Police (Senior Pilot), Uganda.

=== Queen's Police Medal (QPM) ===
England and Wales

- John Wilfred Peter Blenkin, Chief Constable, East Riding of Yorkshire Constabulary.
- Robert McCartney, Chief Constable, Herefordshire Constabulary.
- James Wright, MBE, Assistant Chief Constable, Staffordshire Constabulary.
- Frederick Arthur Statham, Chief Superintendent, Gloucestershire Constabulary.
- James Morris, Chief Superintendent, Liverpool City Police.
- George Gordon Smith, Superintendent, Metropolitan Police.
- William David Gibson, Superintendent, Worcestershire Constabulary.
- James Henry Harris, Superintendent, Metropolitan Police.
- Alexander Paterson, Superintendent, Kingston-upon-Hull City Police.
- Stanley Wilfred Wheal, Superintendent, Metropolitan Police.
- Charles William Phillips, lately Commandant, No. 6 District Police Training Centre, Sandgate, Kent.

British Transport Commission

- Thomas Sawdon Appleby, Superintendent, Newcastle Division, British Transport Commission Police.

Scotland

- Robert William Fleming, Chief Superintendent, Edinburgh City Police.
- William Paterson Gracie, Superintendent, Lanarkshire Constabulary.

Northern Ireland

- Samuel Straghan Russell, Head Constable, Royal Ulster Constabulary.

State of Victoria

- Constable Alfred Lindsey Wightman, Superintendent, Victoria Police Force.

State of South Australia

- Spero Andrew Ross, Superintendent, South Australia Police Force.
- Jacobus Andries Vogelesang, Senior Inspector, South Australia Police Force.
- John Frederick Finn, Superintendent, South Australia Police Force.

Southern Rhodesia

- Kenneth Flower, MBE, Deputy Commissioner, British South Africa Police.

Overseas Territories

- Anthony Francis Salole, Senior Superintendent of Police, Aden.
- Dennis Montague Brockwell, Senior Superintendent of Police, Northern Rhodesia.
- Walter Venia Samuels, Chief of Police, St. Christopher, Nevis and Anguilla.
- Lionel Gladstone Roach, Superintendent, Trinidad Police Force.

Tanganyika

- Major William Elliot Mackenzie, DSO, Senior Assistant Commissioner, Tanganyika Police Force.

=== Queen's Fire Services Medal (QFSM) ===
England and Wales

- James Ronald Goodwin, Divisional Officer (Deputy Chief Officer), Shropshire Fire Brigade.
- Albert Ernest Hurrell, Divisional Officer, Suffolk and Ipswich Fire Brigade.
- Norman Frederick Brown, Divisional Officer (Deputy Chief Officer), Coventry Fire Brigade.
- Jack Carbide, Divisional Officer (Deputy Chief Officer), Bradford Fire Brigade.
- Cyril Thomas, Chief Officer, Monmouthshire Fire Brigade.

Overseas Territories

- Edward Louis Hanlon, Chief Fire Officer, Trinidad and Tobago Fire Services.
- Alfred Drax, Deputy Chief Fire Officer, Trinidad and Tobago Fire Services.

=== Colonial Police Medal (CPM) ===
Southern Rhodesia

- Douglas George Alderson, Superintendent, British South Africa Police.
- Chikowore, Station Sergeant, British South Africa Police.
- Theunis Gert Coetzee, Superintendent, British South Africa Police.
- Manyenga, Station Sergeant, British South Africa Police.
- Nyazemah, Sub-Inspector, British South Africa Police.
- Deryck Sydney Michael O'Donnell, Staff Chief Inspector, British South Africa Police.
- Francis John Pearman, Chief Inspector, British South Africa Police.
- Derrick Robinson, Assistant Superintendent, British South Africa Police.

Tanganyika

- Roy Terence Leger Egan, Senior Superintendent Tanganyika Police Force.
- Adolf Jonas, Inspector, Tanganyika Police Force.
- Ghulam Sarwar Khan, Superintendent, Tanganyika Police Force.
- Shaabani Pazi, Detective Sergeant-Major, Tanganyika Police Force.
- David Charles Quinlan, Assistant Commissioner, Tanganyika Police Force.
- John Arthur Robinson, TD, Assistant Commissioner, Tanganyika Police Force.
- Pantholil Chacko Zachariah, Assistant Superintendent, Tanganyika Police Force.

Overseas Territories

- Alfred Cornelius Allen, Inspector, St. Vincent Police Force.
- John Andrews, Chief Inspector, Hong Kong Police Force.
- George Blythe, Quartermaster, Uganda Police Force.
- Randolph Burroughs, Inspector, Trinidad Police Force.
- George Butler, Inspector, Seychelles Police Force.
- Saulo Byakika, Sergeant, Uganda Police Force.
- Isaak Kipkoech Chepkwoni, Sub-Inspector, Kenya Police Force.
- Thomas Edwin Clunie, Assistant Commissioner, Hong Kong Police Force.
- Thomas William James Dixson, Chief Inspector, Kenya Police Force.
- Denys Drayton, Superintendent, Uganda Police Force.
- Michael Granville Edge, Superintendent, North Borneo Police Force.
- Stephen Herbert St. George Edwards, Superintendent, North Borneo Police Force.
- Albert Leslie Elliott, Senior Superintendent, Kenya Police Force.
- Moses Thiga Gitachu, Sub-Inspector, Kenya Police Force.
- Maurice Gotfried, Superintendent, Hong Kong Auxiliary Police Force.
- Curtis Samuel Griffiths, Detective Inspector, Jamaica Police Force.
- Stanley Charles Larkin, Superintendent, Siarawak Police Force.
- Ricards Gregoris Laurel, Inspector, Hong Kong Police Force.
- Thomas George Leonard Lawson, Superintendent, Kenya Police Force.
- John Bedwell Lees, Senior Superintendent, Hong Kong Police Force.
- Lewis Malcolm Llewelyn, Superintendent, Nyasaland Police Force.
- Leonard William Morrell, Chief Inspector, Kenya Police Force.
- Mutitu Muloo, Sergeant, Kenya Police Force.
- Luka Wambua Mweu, Sub-Inspector, Kenya Police Force.
- Simon Hezekiah Mzamo Nkunika, Assistant Inspector, Northern Rhodesia Police Force.
- Geresom Okker, Head Constable Major, Uganda Police Force.
- Bernard George O'Leary, Senior Superintendent, Northern Rhodesia Police Force.
- Auswin Pereira, Inspector, Trinidad Police Force.
- Arthur Dudley Pyster, Deputy Superintendent, Fiji Police Force.
- Shou Heng-kwei, Sergeant, Hong Kong Police Force.
- Peni Vere, Inspector, Fiji Police Force.
- Erifazi Wandera, Head Constable, Uganda Police Force.
- James Bentley Watson, MC, Senior Superintendent, Uganda Police Force.

== Australia ==
=== Knight Bachelor ===
- Jack Ellerton Becker, in recognition of his contribution to scientific research and pastoral development.
- Stanley Roy Carver, OBE, Commonwealth Statistician.
- Professor Lorimer Fenton Dods, MVO, MD, ChM. For services to Medicine, especially in the field of Paediatrics.
- James Norman Kirby, CBE. For services to Australian industry.
- The Honourable Alexander Lillico, of Devonport, Tasmania. For public services.
- Mortimer Eugene McCarthy, CBE, of Kew, Victoria. For public services.

=== Order of the Bath ===
==== Companion of the Order of the Bath (CB) ====
Military Division

- Rear-Admiral Wilfred Hastings Harrington, CBE, DSO, Royal Australian Navy.

=== Order of Saint Michael and Saint George ===
==== Knight Commander of the Order of St Michael and St George (KCMG) ====
- His Excellency the Right Honourable Sir Eric John Harrison, KCVO, High Commissioner for the Commonwealth of Australia in London.
- The Honourable John McLeay, MM, Speaker of the House of Representatives, Commonwealth of Australia.

==== Companion of the Order of St Michael and St George (CMG) ====
- Marianus Adrian Cuming. For services to Australian industry.
- George Gotardo Foletta. For services to the Australian textile industry.
- The Right Reverend John Stoward Moyes, Bishop of Armidale, New South Wales.
- Phillip Arundell Wright. For services to education and Australian primary industry.

=== Order of the British Empire ===
==== Knight Commander of the Order of the British Empire (KBE) ====
Civil Division

- Lieutenant-Colonel the Honourable Michael Frederick Bruxner, DSO. For political and public services.

==== Commander of the Order of the British Empire (CBE) ====
Military Division

- Acting Rear-Admiral George Carmichael Oldham, DSC, Royal Australian Navy.
- Brigadier John Collin Newbery (515999), Australian Military Forces.
- Group Captain Arthur Dallas Charlton, OBE, Royal Australian Air Force.

Civil Division

- Alfred Norman Armstrong, Deputy Managing Director, Commonwealth Banking Corporation.
- Edward George Bowen, OBE, Chief of the Division of Radiophysics, Commonwealth Scientific and Industrial Research Organisation.
- Robert Frederick Bunting, OBE, MLC, of Goroka, Territory of Papua and New Guinea. For services to ex-servicemen.
- Professor Herbert Burton, Principal of the School of General Studies, Australian National University.
- His Honour Judge Adrian Herbert Curlewis, President of the Surf Life Saving Association of Australia.
- Wilfrid Edwin Robert Francis, President of the Law Council of Australia, 1960–1961.
- Dudley Gordon Molesworth. For services to export shipping.
- John Wallace Overall, MC, Commissioner, National Capital Development Commission.
- Wilfred Alan Westerman, OBE, Secretary, Department of Trade.

==== Officer of the Order of the British Empire (OBE) ====
Military Division

- Captain Eric Douglas Creal, Royal Australian Navy.
- Lieutenant-Colonel John Joseph Edwards, MC, ED (410033), Australian Military Forces.
- Colonel Roy Allen Ellis (337578), Royal Australian Army Ordnance Corps.
- Colonel Charles Francis Flint (3139), Australian Staff Corps.
- Colonel Charles Ferdinand Marks, ED (139001), Royal Australian Army Medical Corps.
- Principal Air Chaplain Kenneth Roderick Morrison, Citizen Air Force.

Civil Division

- Albert John Arthur, Commonwealth Government Printer.
- Richard Benaud, of North Parramatta, New South Wales. For services to Cricket.
- Clement Byrne Christesen, of Eltham, Victoria. For services to Australian literature.
- Margaret Gordon, of Windsor, Queensland. For public services.
- Matthew Harrison, MBE, JP, Federal President, Australian Legion of Ex-servicemen and Women.
- Clare Hull, of Burwood, New South Wales. For social welfare services.
- Sydney Frederick Ernest Liebert, of Randwick, New South Wales. For services to Education.
- Allan Henry Loomes, Assistant Secretary Department of External Affairs.
- Alderman Ronald Starke Luke, of Mosman, New South Wales. For services to local government.
- The Reverend Mother Mary Marion, Mother Superior, Convent of the Sisters of the Order of the Sacred Heart, East Arm Leprosarium, Darwin, Northern Territory.
- The Very Reverend Monsignor James Francis McCosker, of Harris Park, New South Wales. For services in the field of child care.
- John Maurice Mills, Deputy Crown Solicitor, Sydney, New South Wales.
- Rabbi Herman Max Sanger, Chief Minister, Temple Beth Israel, Melbourne, Victoria.
- Gladys Aroha Schott, MBE, President of the Royal Australian Nursing Federation.
- Harry Temple Watts, formerly deputy director, Bureau of Mineral Resources, Geology and Geophysics.
- William Weatherly, DFC, chairman, Australian Woolgrowers' Council.
- Godfrey Westacott, of Rockhampton, Queensland. For services to Journalism.

==== Member of the Order of the British Empire (MBE) ====
Military Division

Royal Australian Navy

- Engineer Lieutenant-Commander Bertie Stephen Martin.
- Electrical Lieutenant-Commander Henry Macdonald Pittaway.

Australian Military Forces

- Captain (temporary) John Patrick Brown (615254), Royal Australian Army Education Corps.
- 33419 Warrant Officer Class II Kenneth Arthur Capp, Royal Australian Army Service Corps.
- Major Kenneth Tebbet Johnson, ED (520571), Royal Australian Infantry Corps.
- 21432 Warrant Officer Class II Bain Mackay, Royal Australian Infantry Corps.
- Major John Alan McCrory (237524), Australian Staff Corps.
- Major William Frederick Robeson (2213), Australian Staff Corps.
- 1716 Warrant Officer Class I Dallas Jarvis Wilschefski, Royal Corps of Australian Electrical and Mechanical Engineers.

Royal Australian Air Force

- Squadron Leader William John Neilsen, BEM, (022006).
- Warrant Officer William John Carlson (A.3960).
- Warrant Officer Ronald Bruce Gibbons (A.2835).

Civil Division

- Beulah Alice Bolton, of Hunter's Hill, New South Wales. For social welfare services.
- John Brackenreg, of Artarmon, New South Wales. For services in the promotion of Australian Art.
- Cyril Sabine Warner-Bubb, Executive Officer, Medical and Hospital Section, Department of Health.
- Alderman Thomas Cavill, JP, Ashfield Municipality. For public services.
- Joseph Coates, of Manilla, New South Wales. For services to ex-servicemen.
- Frank Charles Day, Principal Naval Architect, Department of the Navy.
- Arthur Robert Cameron Draper, formerly assistant director of Postal and Transport Services, Postmaster-General's Department, Victoria.
- Frederick Henry James Fry, Representative of the Australian Broadcasting Commission in Launceston.
- Harry Michael Gibson, of Bondi Beach, New South Wales. For public and social welfare services.
- Ella Mona Green, of Clarence Park, South Australia. For social welfare services.
- John Frederick Hughes, Command Paymaster, Southern Command, Department of the Army.
- Robert Charles Jones, Assistant Director-General (Construction), Department of Works.
- Margaret Annie Kerr, of Coogee, New South Wales. For social welfare services.
- Clara Watohorn Lelean, of Elsternwick, Victoria. For services to Nursing.
- Catherine Margaret Mackenzie, Matron of the Australian Presbyterian Mission Hospital, Pusan, Korea.
- Helen Pearl Mackenzie, Medical Officer-in-Charge of the Australian Presbyterian Mission Hospital, Pusan, Korea.
- Robert McEwan, of Ashfield, New South Wales. For services to young people especially under the auspices of the Boys' Brigade.
- Ida Messenger, of Randwick, New South Wales. For services in the interests of ex-servicemen.
- John James Nathaniel Nevill, Secretary, Australian Shipbuilding Board.
- Charlotte Quinn Pond, of Geraldton, Western Australia. For charitable and public services.
- Edith Mary Robinson, of Manly, New South Wales. For services to Nursing.
- Alan John Strevens Scott, formerly Director of Finance and Stores, Department of Civil Aviation.
- Walter Peden Joyce Skelton, JP, of Belmore, New South Wales. For services to elderly people.
- Roy Charles Tancred, JP, of Narromine, New South Wales. For services to the community.
- Lena Elizabeth Trevenan, of Ballarat, Victoria. For social welfare services.
- Frank Elliot Samuel Trigg, Honorary Secretary, Industrial Fund for the Advancement of Science in Independent Schools.
- Elizabeth White, of Red Hill, Australian Capital Territory. For services to elderly people.
- Nina Hazel Woodward, of Glen Iris, Victoria. For public and social welfare services.

=== British Empire Medal (BEM) ===
Military Division

Royal Australian Navy

- Chief Mechanician James Edward Reid, R21132.
- Chief Engine Room Artificer Stanley Alexander Russell, R32351.

Australian Military Forces

- 26950 Staff-Sergeant Bruce Albert Atherton, Royal Australian Armoured Corps.
- 2645 Warrant Officer Class II (temporary) George William Cousins, Royal Australian Infantry Corps.
- 41706 Sergeant (temporary) Peter Dolan, Australian Intelligence Corps.
- 246281 Staff-Sergeant Leonard Munro Jack Lyneham, Royal Australian Army Service Corps.
- 21796 Warrant Officer Class II (temporary) William Mullaney, Royal Australian Army Service Corps.
- 275817 Staff-Sergeant Walter William Smith, Royal Australian Infantry Corps.
- 5640 Staff-Sergeant (temporary) Ronald William Taylor, Royal Australian Army Service Corps.

Royal Australian Air Force

- A.22905 Flight Sergeant Donald Vincent Smith.
- A.2536 Flight Sergeant Antony Thompson.
- A.36435 Sergeant Ian Thomas Waters.

Civil Division

- Charles William Frederick Carthew, Training School Instructor, Overseas Telecommunications Commission (Australia).
- Rose Bellatti Crow, Archivist, Australian Embassy, Washington.
- Cecil Dreise, Senior Works Supervisor, Snowy Mountains Authority.
- Joseph Grech, Foreman Driller, Snowy Mountains Authority.
- Gordon Stuart Hele, lately Officer-in-Charge of the Outdoor Inquiry Branch, Department of Social Services.
- Phyllis McAllister Judd, Supervisor of Typists, Department of the Navy.
- Kathleen Mary McIntosh, Supervisor of Typists, Department of Air.
- Harry Marsden, Foreman Examiner, Naval Ordnance Design and Inspection Branch, Department of the Navy.
- James Shore, Supervisor, Overseas Telecommunications Commission (Australia).
- Selfey Gordon Tremaine Stearman, Supervisor, Instrument Section, Trans Australia Airlines.
- Miloslav Tsarevich, Supervising Chainman, Snowy Mountains Authority.
- Dudley Lewis Grove Turner, lately Marine Officer Grade 1, Airways Engineering Branch, New South Wales, Department of Civil Aviation.

=== Air Force Cross (AFC) ===
- Wing Commander Charles Edward Wakeham (033168), Royal Australian Air Force.
- Squadron Leader Vincent Jerome Hill, DFC, (033618), Royal Australian Air Force.
- Flight Lieutenant John Anthony Worthington Laming (037575), Royal Australian Air Force.

==== Bar to Air Force Cross ====
- Wing Commander William Roy Fitter, AFC, (022041), Royal Australian Air Force.

=== Queen's Commendation for Valuable Service in the Air ===
- Flight Lieutenant John Arundell Radford (035029), Royal Australian Air Force.
- Flight Lieutenant Roy Walter Hibben (037568), Royal Australian Air Force.

== Nigeria ==
=== Order of Saint Michael and Saint George ===
==== Knight Commander of the Order of St Michael and St George (KCMG) ====
Western Region

- Sir Adesoji Aderemi I, KBE, CMG, the Oni of Ife, Governor of Western Nigeria.

==== Companion of the Order of St Michael and St George (CMG) ====
Federation of Nigeria

- John Ernest Hodge, CVO, Deputy Inspector-General of Police.

Northern Region

- Alhaji Muhammadu Ndayako, Etsu Nupe, Emir of Bida.
- John Taylor, lately Permanent Secretary, Ministry of Finance.

Eastern Region

- Daniel Ernest Okereke, Speaker, House of Assembly.

Western Region

- Samuel Adedigba Ojo, OBE, chairman, Public Service Commission.

=== Order of the British Empire ===
==== Knight Commander of the Order of the British Empire (KBE) ====
Civil Division

Federation of Nigeria

- Oba Adeniji Adele II, CBE, Oba of Lagos.

Northern Region

- Alhaji the Honourable Usman Nagogo, CMG, CBE, Emir of Katsina, Minister without Portfolio.

==== Commander of the Order of the British Empire (CBE) ====
Civil Division

Federation of Nigeria

- Robert Knight Innes, formerly General Manager, Nigerian Railway Corporation.

Northern Region

- Hector Gordon Jelf, Permanent Secretary, Ministry of Education.
- Mallam Muhammadu Tukur, Emir of Muri.

Eastern Region

- Phillip Treherne Barton, MBE, Permanent Secretary, Ministry of Finance.

Western Region

- Oba Adelupo Ogunmokun, Biladu III, the Owa of Ilesha, President of the House of Chiefs.

==== Officer of the Order of the British Empire (OBE) ====
Military Division

- Lieutenant-Colonel Gerald Edward Ashley Beale (378420), Royal Regiment of Artillery; formerly on loan to the Government of the Federation of Nigeria.

Civil Division

Federation of Nigeria

- James Joseph Balmain, Administrative Officer, Class I.
- Thompson Edogbeji Aitkins Salubi, Industrial Relations Commissioner.
- James Smyth, Administrative Officer, Class II.
- Theophilus Augustus Williams, assistant director of Federal Audit.

Northern Region

- Arthur Frank Bryson, MB, FRCS, Senior Specialist (Orthopaedics).
- John Edward Evans, Chief Architect.
- Mallam Ibrahim Musa Gashash, Minister of Land and Survey.
- George Uru Ohikere, Minister of Works, 1957–1961.
- Alhaji Umaru, Emir of Pategi.

Eastern Region

- Joseph Ogbogu Onyeachonam, MRCS, LRCP, a medical practitioner, of Onitsha.
- Norman Charles Perkins, Administrative Officer, Class I.
- George Donald Gordon Plummer, Controller of Works Services, Supernumerary, Ministry of Works.

Western Region

- Oba Daniel Komolafe Aladesanmi II, the Ewi of Ado Ekiti, Deputy President of the House of Chiefs.
- Senator Dahlton Ogieva Asemota, Federal Upper House; a merchant, of Benin City.
- Chief Cornelius Olaleye Taiwo, Permanent Secretary, Ministry of Agriculture and Natural Resources.

==== Member of the Order of the British Empire (MBE) ====
Military Division

- Lieutenant-Colonel Johnson Thomas Umunamikwe Aguiyi-Ironsi, MVO, The Queen's Own Nigeria Regiment.
- Lieutenant Harford Iloputaife, Royal Nigerian Army.
- Warrant Officer Class I Mohammadu Garuba, Royal Nigerian Army.

Civil Division

Federation of Nigeria

- David Ackroyd, Area Controller, Department of Posts and Telegraphs.
- Fabian Okonkwo Osa-Afiana, formerly Head Postmaster Grade III, Posts and Telegraphs Division.
- Sallusttdan Elias Da Silva, Assistant Works Manager, Public Works Department.
- Bernard Evelyn Buller Fagg, Director of Antiquities.
- Viola Remilekun Fashoro, Assistant Nursing, Sister, Nigerian Nursing Service.
- John Derek Sowerby, Superintendent of Police.

Northern Region

- George Ajai Balogun, Headmaster, Royal Catholic School, Okene.
- Alhaji Mohammadu Danmalam, Wambai of Katsina.
- Alhaji Dogondaji, Principal Technical Officer.
- Douglas Charles William de Clancey Eva, DFC, Surveyor-General.
- Mallam Abba Anas Baba Gana, Acting Secretary to the Agent-General for Northern Nigeria in London.
- Alhaji Abubakar Garba, Madaki of Bauchi.
- Keith Husk, Senior Assistant Secretary, Public Service Commission.
- Alhaji Haruna Kassim, a merchant, of Kano.
- Zanna Luntima Mustafa Laisu, Councillor and Development Secretary, Bornu Native Authority.
- Alhaji Abubakar Maigari, Chief of Protocol.

Eastern Region

- Eliazar Obiakonwa Enemo, Supervisor of Schools and Education Secretary, Diocese on the Niger (Church Missionary Society).
- Chief James Ahunanya Nwosu, Igbo of Amaigbo.
- Smart Ndem Okpi, Senior Assistant Registrar of Co-operative Societies, Ministry of Commerce.
- Sister Mary Cyprian Shevlin, Matron, Roman Catholic Maternity Hospital, Onitsha.
- John Archibald Peter Wiseman, Comptroller of Rest Houses, Eastern Nigeria Development Corporation.

Western Region

- The Reverend Canon Samuel Ayodele Banjo, Principal, St Luke's Teacher Training College, Ibadan.
- Jacob Egharevba, formerly Curator of Benin Museum.
- Esezi II, the Orodje of Okpe, a member of the House of Chiefs.
- Chief Theophilus Adediran Oni. For public services, especially in connection with the improvement of roads.
- Lydia Bolaji Osanyin, of Ekiti, for social welfare services.

=== British Empire Medal (BEM) ===
Military Division

- Sergeant Clarence Marsden Kitchener, The Queen's Own Nigeria Regiment.
- Private Joseph Mndza, The Queen's Own Nigeria Regiment.
- Sergeant Michael Ogoja, Royal Nigerian Army.

Civil Division

- Samuel Oritsejafo, Sergeant Major, Nigeria Police Force.

=== Queen's Police Medal (QPM) ===
- Peter John Harley, OBE, Commissioner, Nigeria Police Force.
- Louis Orok Edet, Deputy Commissioner, Nigeria Police Force.
- Michael James Homersham Cartlidge, Deputy Commissioner, Nigeria Police Force.

== Sierra Leone ==
=== Order of Saint Michael and Saint George ===
==== Companion of the Order of St Michael and St George (CMG) ====
- The Most Reverend James Lawrence Cecil Horstead, CBE, lately Archbishop of West Africa and Bishop of Sierra Leone.

=== Order of the British Empire ===
==== Officer of the Order of the British Empire (OBE) ====
Civil Division

- John Harold Ellen, Assistant Commissioner of Police.
- Thomas William Skuse, Director of Surveys and Lands.
- Eustace Milton Llewellyn Williams, Government Printer.

==== Member of the Order of the British Empire (MBE) ====
Civil Division

- Brahima Victor Sulaiman Kpunya Kebbie, Paramount Chief of Malen Chiefdom, Pujehun District.
- Robert Baoma Kowa, Secretary, Bo District Council.
- Sufyanu Abdul Rahman, Secretary, Agricultural Department.
- William Sylvester Young, Acting Master and Registrar, Supreme Court.

=== British Empire Medal (BEM) ===
Civil Division

- Lamina Kamara, Cable Jointer, Electricity Department.
- George Smith, Technical Staff, Grade I, Electricity Department.
- Francis Barber Taylor, Foreman Driver, Public Works Department.

== Federation of Rhodesia and Nyasaland ==
=== Order of the British Empire ===
==== Knight Commander of the Order of the British Empire (KBE) ====
Civil Division

- Keith Courtney Acutt, CBE. For services to Industry in the Federation.

==== Commander of the Order of the British Empire (CBE) ====
Military Division

- Air Vice-Marshal Alfred Mulock Bentley, OBE, AFC, Royal Rhodesian Air Force.

Civil Division

- Harry White Jeffreys, formerly Federal Minister in Washington.
- James Ward, Chairman of the Federal Power Board.

==== Officer of the Order of the British Empire (OBE) ====
Military Division

- Lieutenant-Colonel Cyril Richard Alick Blackwell, MBE, ED, 2nd Battalion, The Royal Rhodesia Regiment.

Civil Division

- Robert Starkey Arnot, Chief Engineer of the Rhodesia Congo Border Power Corporation.
- Robert Gordon Hoskins Davies, President of the Rhodesia Tobacco Association.
- Francis Arthur Radcliffe James, MBE, Under-Secretary in the Ministry of Defence.

==== Member of the Order of the British Empire (MBE) ====
Military Division

- Major Joseph Baron, MC, ED, MB, No. 1 Medical Company, attached to the 2nd Battalion, The Royal Rhodesia Regiment.

Civil Division

- Thomas Cullinan Barker, formerly Deputy Postmaster-General.
- Claude Llewellen Cook. For services to journalism.
- Betty Winifred Beatrice Holdengarde. For political services.
- Grace Houston, formerly Matron at Harare Hospital.
- Jashbhai Baboolal Patel. For public and political services.
- Roland Mortimer Slatter, formerly Headmaster of Highlands School.

=== British Empire Medal (BEM) ===
Military Division

- Warrant Officer Class II Denson Chirwa, 1st Battalion, Northern Rhodesia Regiment.

Civil Division

- Bernard Percy Ashan Mulemeka, Principal Medical Assistant.

=== Queen's Commendation for Valuable Service in the Air ===
- Captain Roderick Archibald Mackie, DFC, Senior Commander, Central African Airways.
