= List of alumni of St John's College, Oxford =

A list of alumni of St John's College, Oxford, former students of the college of the University of Oxford. The overwhelming maleness of this list is partially explained by the fact that for over 90% of its history (from its foundation in 1555 until 1979), women were barred from studying at St John's. The college maintains a growing list of profiles of prominent recent alumni on its website.

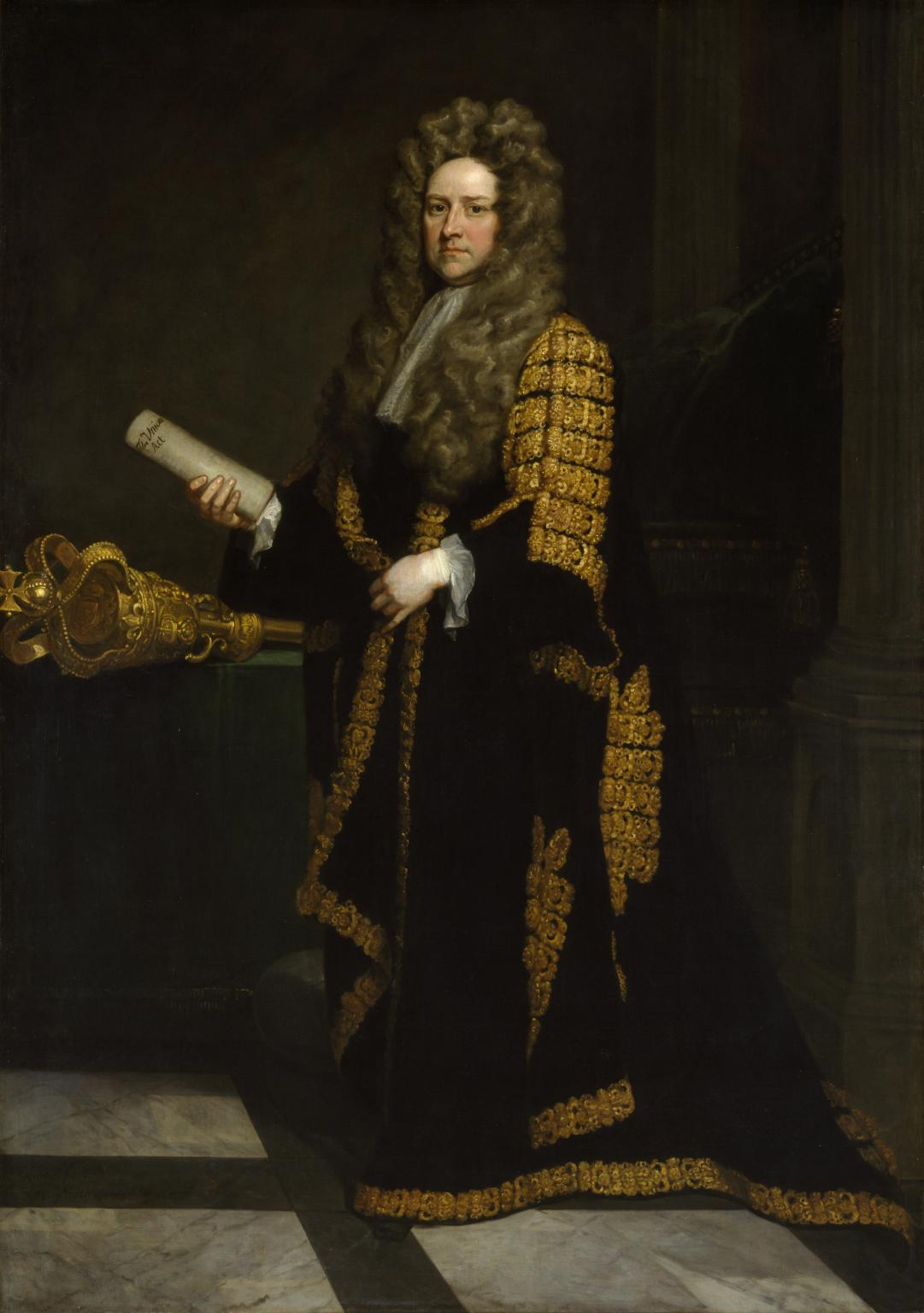
John Smith, Chancellor of the Exchequer

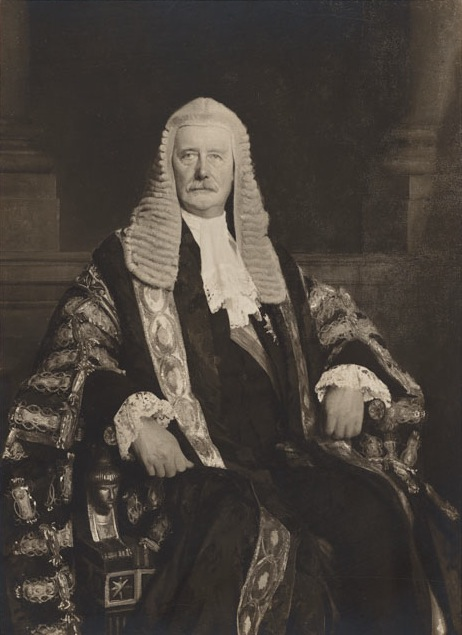
George Cave, 1st Viscount Cave, lawyer and Conservative politician

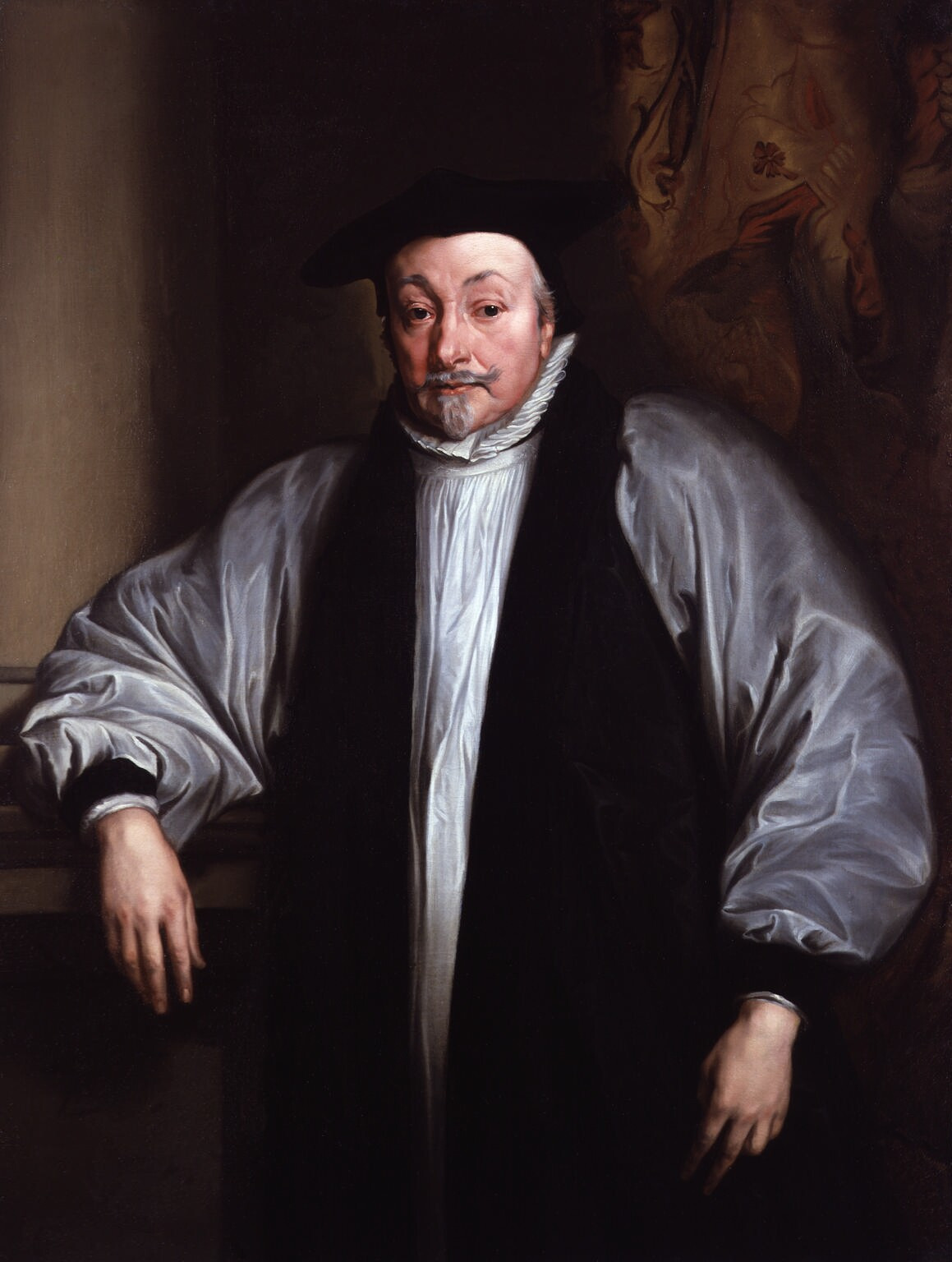
William Laud, 76th Archbishop of Canterbury

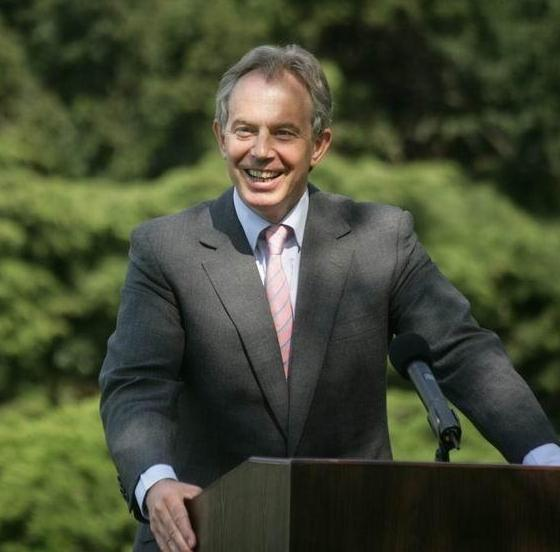
Tony Blair, Prime Minister of the United Kingdom (1997-2007)

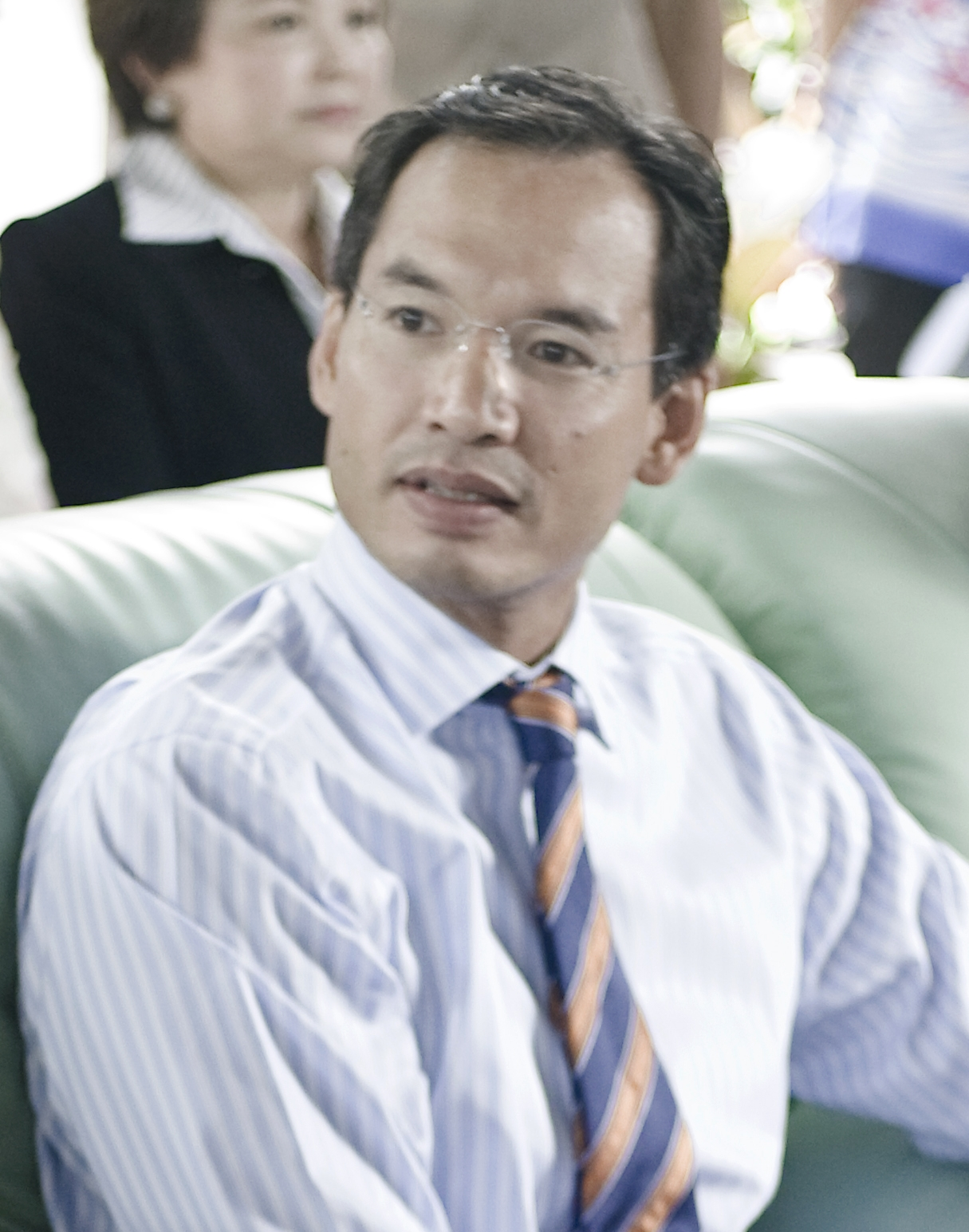
Korn Chatikavanij, former Finance Minister of Thailand

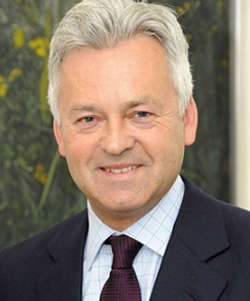
Alan Duncan, Conservative MP

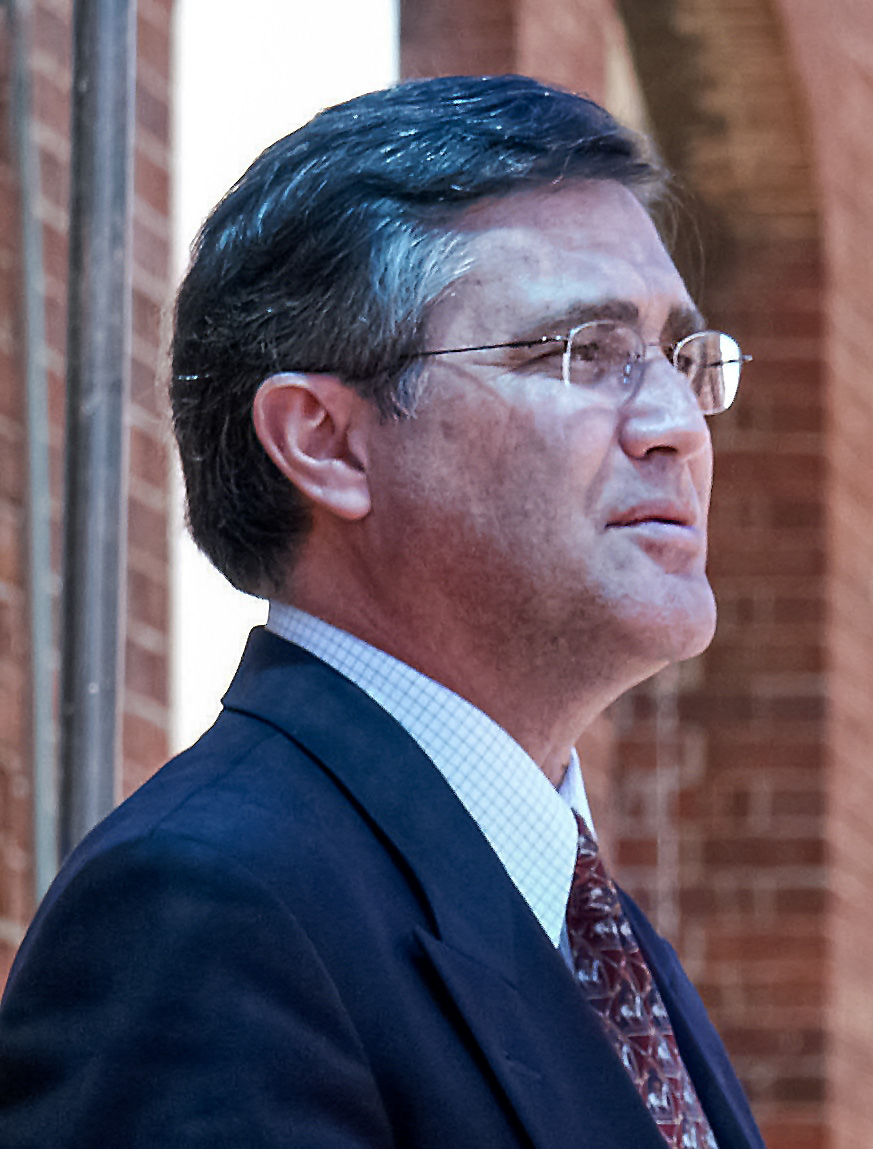
Geoff Gallop, 27th Premier of Western Australia

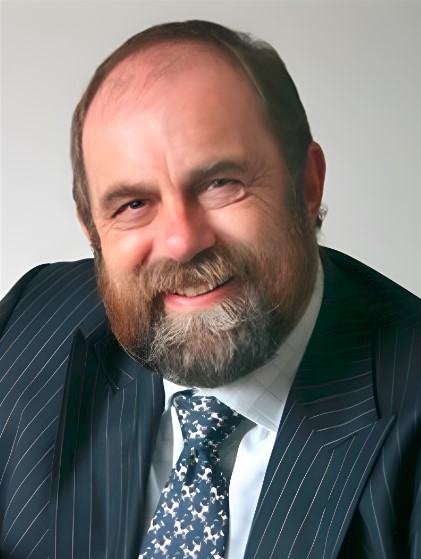
David Heath, Liberal Democrat MP (1997-2015)

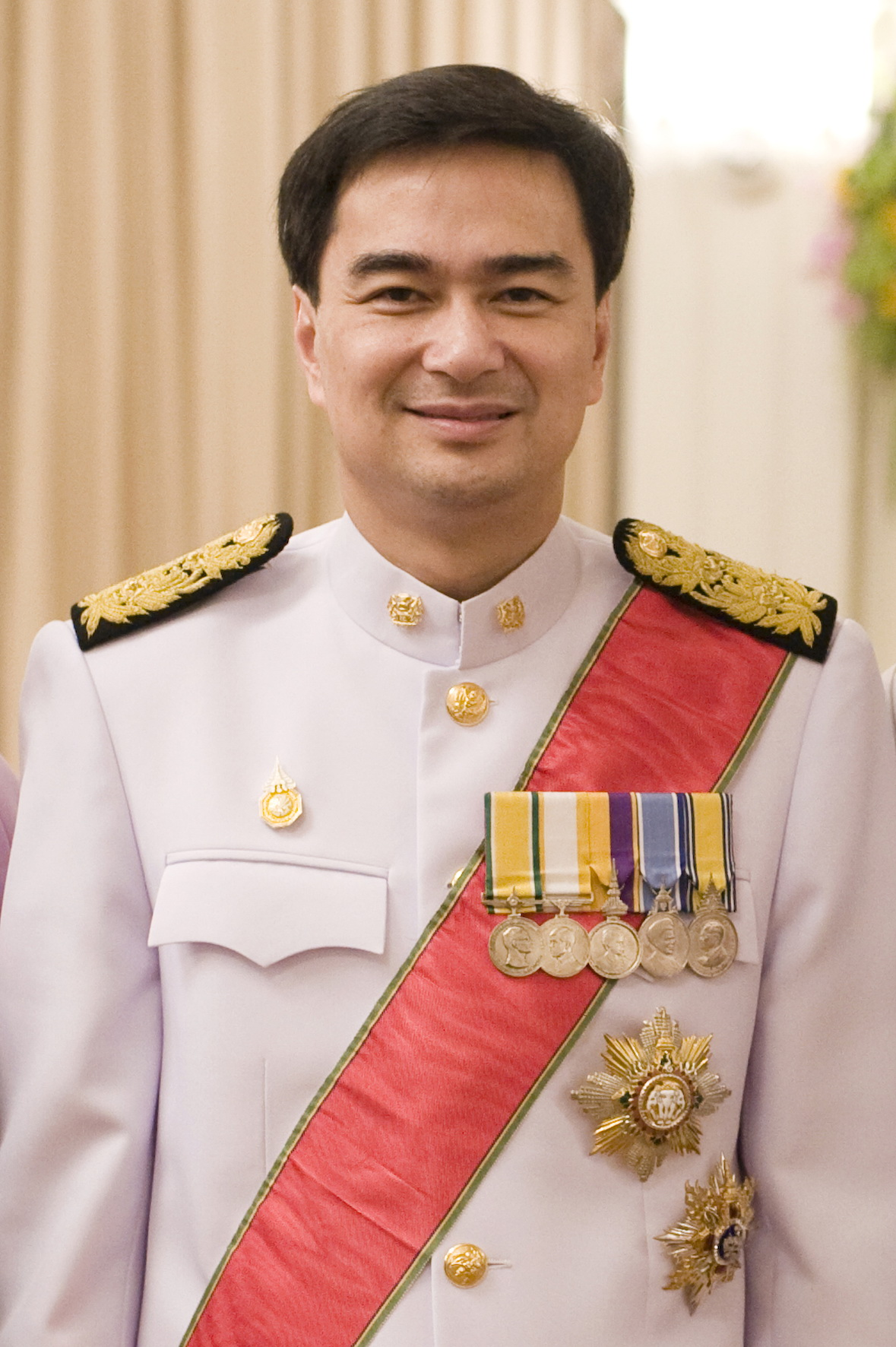
Abhisit Vejjajiva, 27th Prime Minister of Thailand (2008-2011)

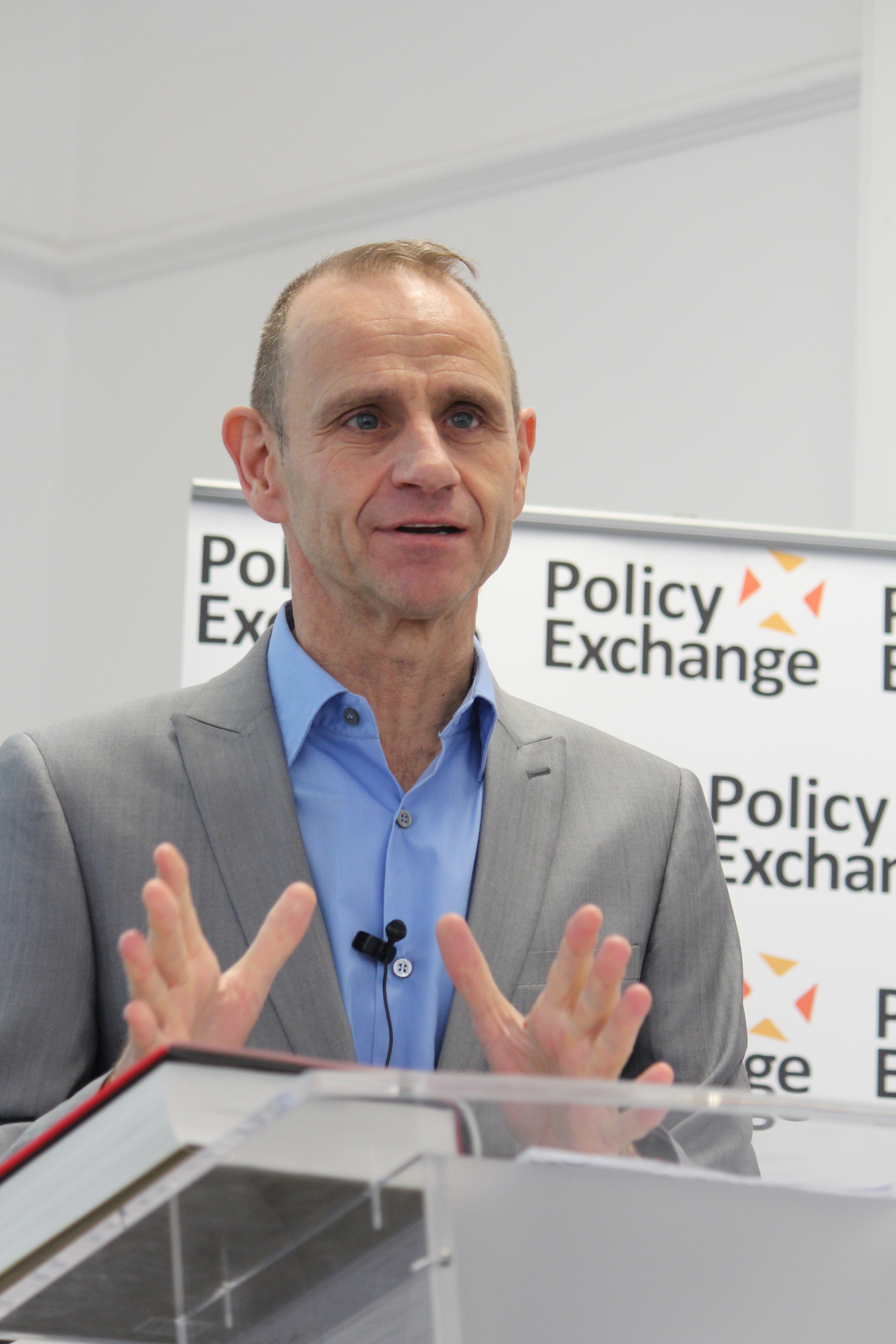
Evan Davis, journalist and TV presenter

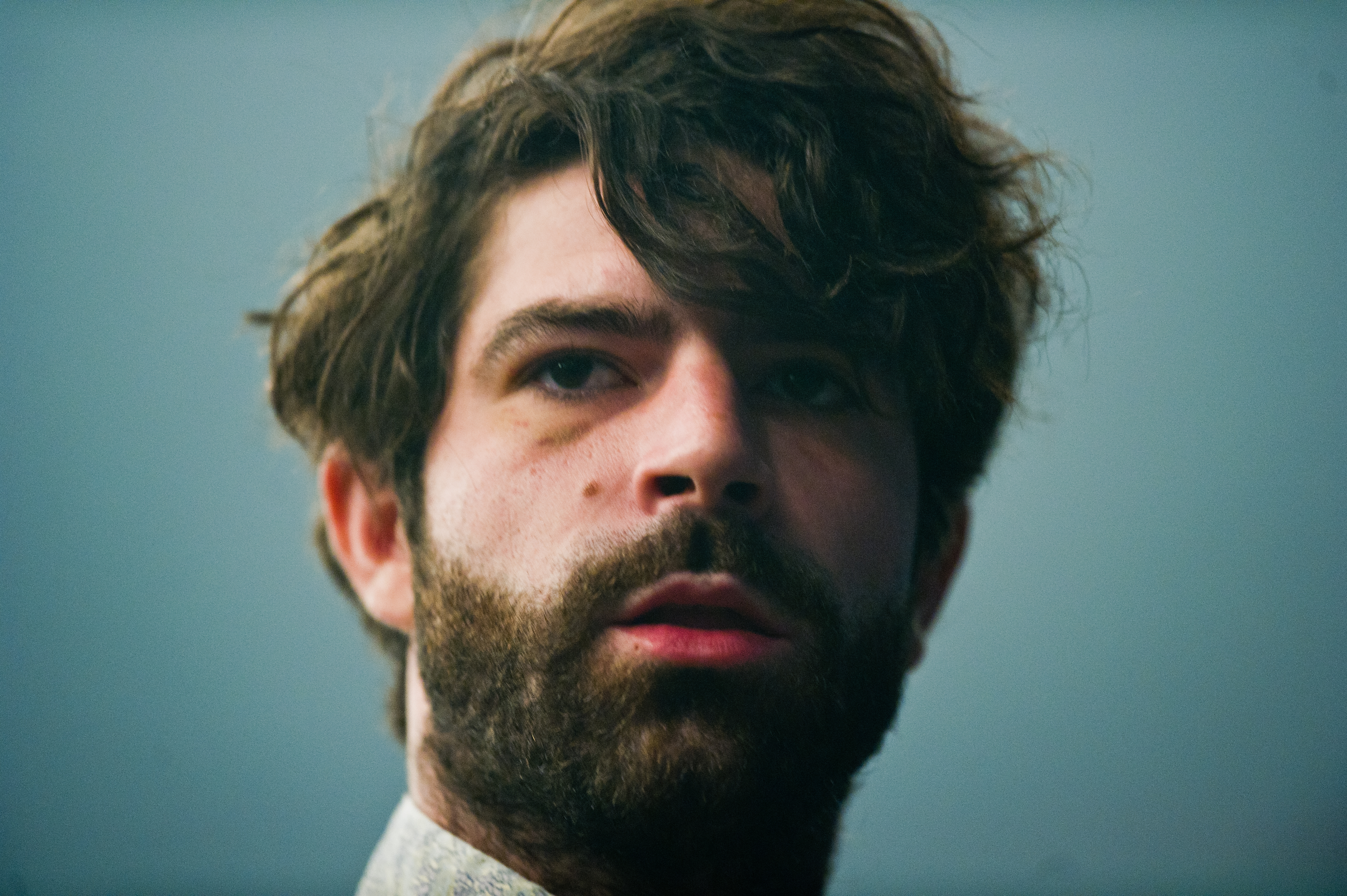
Yannis Philippakis, musician

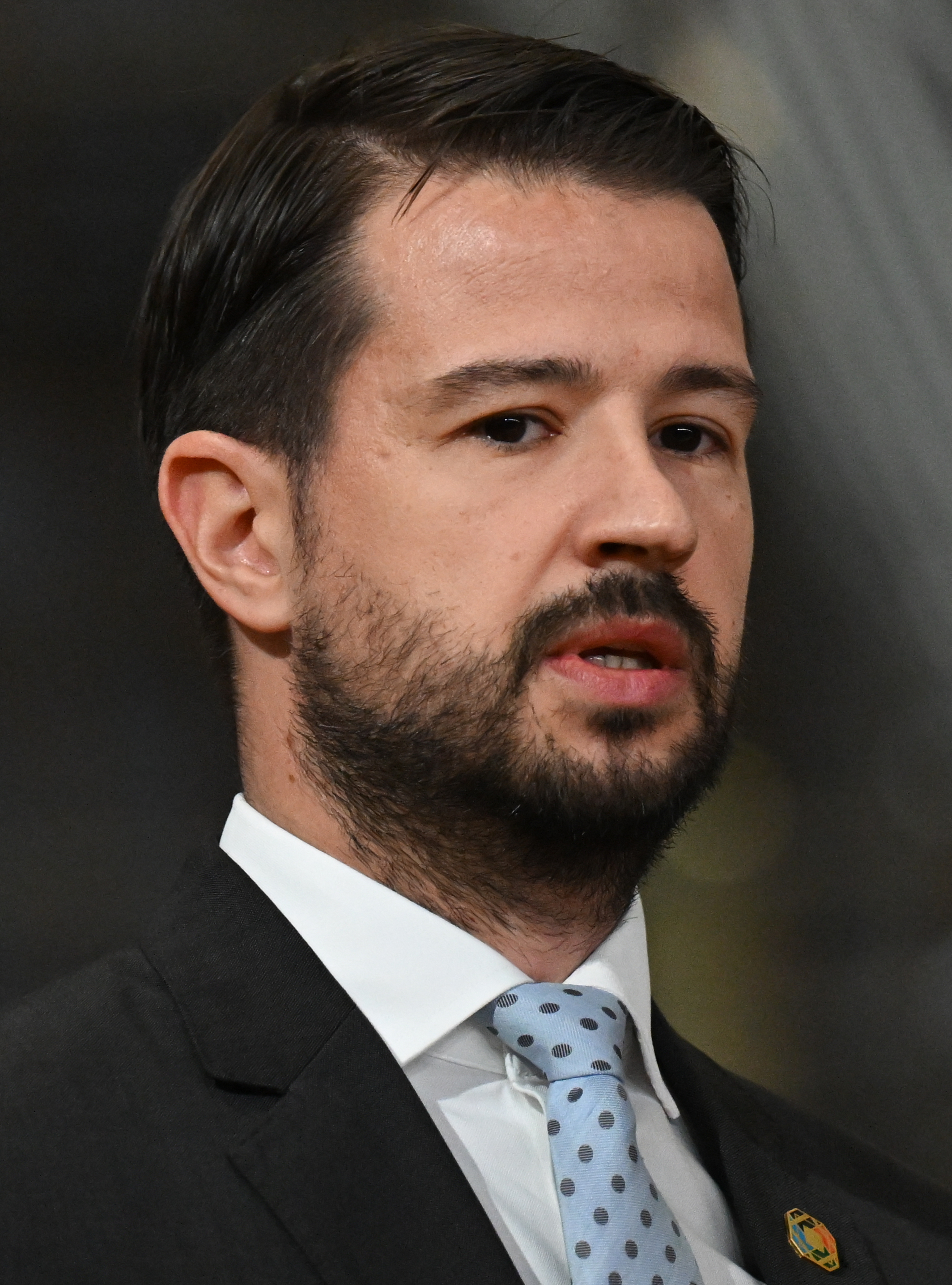
Jakov Milatović, 3rd President of Montenegro (2023–present)

== Politicians in the United Kingdom ==
Name	M	Degree	Notes	Ref
Rushanara Ali	1993	BA PPE	Labour MP for Bethnal Green and Bow (2010–2024), Bethnal Green and Stepney (2024–)	
Edward Bayntun	1636		MP for Devizes and Calne at various points between 1640 and 1679	
Aaron Bell	1998	BA PPE	Conservative MP for Newcastle-Under-Lyme (2019–2024)	
Tony Blair (HF)	1972	BA Jurisprudence (2nd, 1975)	Prime Minister of the United Kingdom (1997–2007); Labour MP for Sedgefield (1983–2007)	
Aidan Burley	1998	BA Theology	Conservative MP for Cannock Chase (2010–2015)	
Alistair Burt	1974	BA Jurisprudence (1977)	Conservative MP for Bury North (1983–1997) and North East Bedfordshire (2001–2019)	
Alan Duncan	1976	BA PPE (1979)	Conservative MP for Rutland and Melton (1992–2019)	
Angela Eagle	1980	BA PPE	Labour MP for Wallasey (1992–)	
John Grogan	1979	BA History and Economics (1982)	Labour MP for Selby (1997–2010)	
David Heath	1972	MA Physiological Sciences	Liberal Democrat MP for Somerton and Frome (1997–2015)	
John Howell	1978	DPhil Archaeology	Conservative MP for Henley (2008–2024)	
Gregg McClymont	1999	DPhil History	Labour MP for Cumbernauld, Kilsyth and Kirkintilloch East (2010–2015)	
Andrew Smith	1969	BA PPE, BPhil	Labour MP for Oxford East (1987–2017); Chief Secretary to the Treasury (1999–2002); Secretary of State for Work and Pensions (2002–2004)	
David Tredinnick	1981	MLitt	Conservative MP for Bosworth (1987–2019)	

- George Cave, 1st Viscount Cave
- Charles Cripps, 1st Baron Parmoor
- Henry Croke
- Edward du Cann
- William Duckett, MP
- Gwynfor Evans, former President of Plaid Cymru and first MP
- John Gilbert, Baron Gilbert
- Robert Henley, 1st Earl of Northington
- Auberon Herbert, MP and political philosopher.
- Richard Holme, Baron Holme of Cheltenham
- Leslie Hore-Belisha, 1st Baron Hore-Belisha
- Peter Mews of Hinton Admiral
- Rhodri Morgan, former First Minister of Wales
- John Parker, MP
- Thomas Russell
- John Smith, 17th-century Chancellor of the Exchequer
- Shaun Spiers
- Michael Stewart, Baron Stewart of Fulham
- William Trumbull
- Henry Wallop
- Francis Windebank
- Sir Richard Wrottesley, 7th Baronet

== Politicians and royalty of other countries ==
Name	M	Degree	Notes	Ref
Korn Chatikavanij	1983	BA PPE	Thailand Finance Minister (2008–2011)	
Prince Diego Massimiliano De Giorgi	2010	-	Visiting research student at the Faculty of Law; Head of the House of Giorgi (2014–)	
Prince Fumihito	1988	-	Visiting graduate student at the Department of Zoology; Prince Akishino of Japan	
Geoff Gallop	1972	BA PPE (2nd, 1974)	Rhodes Scholar; 27th Premier of Western Australia (2001–2006)	
Olara Otunnu	1973	BA Jurisprudence	St John's Overseas Scholar; Uganda's Ambassador to the United Nations (1980–1985); President of the International Peace Academy (1990–1998); UN Under-Secretary General and Special Representative for Children and Armed Conflict (1998–2005); President of the Uganda People's Congress (2010–2015)	
Lester B. Pearson (HF, 1946)	1921	BA Modern History (2nd, 1923), MA (1925)	Nobel Peace Prize laureate (1957); 14th Prime Minister of Canada (1963–1968)	
Dean Rusk	1931	BS (1933), MA (1934)	Rhodes Scholar; Secretary of State of the United States (1961–1969)	
A. N. R. Robinson (HF)	1951	BA PPE (2nd, 1953), MA	3rd Prime Minister of Trinidad and Tobago (1986–1991); 3rd President of Trinidad and Tobago (1997–2003)	
Craig Scott	1984	BA Jurisprudence (1986, 1st)	Rhodes Scholar; Canadian politician	
Abhisit Vejjajiva	1983	BA PPE (1st), MPhil	27th Prime Minister of Thailand (2008–2011)	

== Civil servants and diplomats ==
- Alan Bailey, formerly Permanent Secretary, Department of Transport
- Mervyn Brown, Ambassador of the United Kingdom to Madagascar (1967–70), High Commissioner of the United Kingdom to Tanzania (1975–78), High Commissioner of the United Kingdom to Nigeria (1979–83)
- Ash Carter, United States Secretary of Defense
- Charles Crawford, Ambassador of the United Kingdom to Bosnia and Herzegovina (1996–98), Ambassador of the United Kingdom to Yugoslavia (2001–03), Ambassador of the United Kingdom to Poland (2003–07)
- David Faulkner, civil servant
- David Frost, Ambassador of the United Kingdom to Denmark (2006–08), CEO of the Scotch Whisky Association (2014–)
- Arnold Heeney
- Geoffrey Holland, former Permanent Secretary, Department of Employment and Department of Education and Vice-Chancellor, Exeter University; chairman, Quality Improvement Agency
- Khoo Boon Hui, president of INTERPOL
- Michael McFaul, United States Ambassador to Russia (2012-2014)
- Frank Newsam
- Michael Partridge, former Permanent Secretary, Department of Social Security; Pro-Chancellor and Governor, Middlesex University
- Sir David Pepper, former director of GCHQ
- R. James Woolsey, Jr., United States Under Secretary of the Navy (1977–79), 16th Director of the Central Intelligence Agency (1993–95)
- Chris Wormald, Permanent Secretary, Department of Health
- Heath Tarbert, Nominee for Assistant Secretary of the Treasury for International Markets and Development in the U.S. (2017)

== Judges and lawyers ==
- Nigel Carrington, lawyer and Vice-Chancellor of University of the Arts London
- Brian Cregan, Irish High Court judge
- James Eyre, judge
- Nicholas Hamblen, Justice of the Supreme Court of the United Kingdom
- Gérard La Forest, former Puisne Justice of the Supreme Court of Canada
- Keith Lindblom
- John Nicholl
- Stephen Richards, Lord Justice
- John Silvester, Recorder of London
- Mark Warby, judge
- James Whitelocke

== Clergy ==
=== Saints, blessed and archbishops of Canterbury ===
Name	M	Degree	Notes	Ref
Edmund Campion (F)	c. 1557	-	Roman Catholic Jesuit priest, martyr and saint	
Edward James	c. 1575	-	Roman Catholic priest, martyr and saint	
William Juxon (F)	1598	BCL (1603), DCL (1621)	President of St John's (1621-1633); Vice-Chancellor of the University of Oxford (1626-1628); Lord High Treasurer (1636-1641); 77th Archbishop of Canterbury (1660-1663)	
William Laud (F)	1589	BA (1594), MA (1598)	President of St John's (1611–1621); Chancellor of the University of Oxford (1630–1641); 76th Archbishop of Canterbury (1633–1645)	
John Roberts	1596	-	Roman Catholic Benedictine monk, priest, martyr and saint	

=== Other bishops ===
- Alfred Averill, Archbishop of New Zealand
- Paul Barber
- John Buckeridge
- Robert Hay, Bishop of Buckingham
- Kenneth Kirk
- Peter Mews
- Hugh Montefiore
- Edwin Morris, Archbishop of Wales
- Peter Selby
- David Wilcox
- Kenneth Woollcombe

=== Other priests ===
- Fergus Butler-Gallie, priest and writer
- Frederick Copleston
- Edward Drax Free
- Vicesimus Knox
- Peter Smalle, priest and poet
- Peter Thomson
- George Austen
- James Austen
- Henry Thomas Austen

== Journalists and writers ==
- Mark Abley, poet and journalist
- Kingsley Amis, novelist
- Daniel Blythe, author
- Ivor Bulmer-Thomas
- David Chater, award-winning British television foreign correspondent
- Tom Chatfield, author
- Victoria Coren Mitchell
- Edmund Crispin
- Evan Davis, journalist
- Janine Gibson, journalist
- Robert Graves, poet
- John Lawrence Hammond, journalist and editor
- A. E. Housman, classical scholar, and poet
- Simon Jack, BBC Business Editor, Presenter of Today Programme
- Simon Jenkins, journalist and editor
- John Lanchester
- Philip Larkin, poet and librarian
- Bronwen Maddox
- Vic Marks, journalist and cricketer
- Timothy Mo, novelist
- Musa Okwonga, writer
- Peter Preston, journalist and editor
- Alan Ross
- Hugh Schofield, BBC Paris correspondent
- James Shirley
- J. K. Stanford
- D. J. Taylor
- James Townley
- Jason Webster
- Norman Webster, journalist and editor
- John Wain
- Henry Willobie, poet
- Jonathan Wright, journalist and translator

== Sports ==
- Sue Day, England rugby captain
- John Davis, Welsh cricketer
- William Evans, Welsh international footballer
- Mike Fitzpatrick, footballer
- Chris Penny, American rower, 1988 Blue Boat, Olympic silver medallist
- Barbara Slater, sports producer and gymnast
- Norman Taber, Olympic Athlete
- Chris Tavare, England international cricketer
- John Young, cricketer

Name	M	Degree	Notes	Ref
Jennifer Howitt Browning	2005	MPhil Development Studies (2007)	Rhodes Scholar. 2004 Athens Paralympics Wheelchair Basketball Gold medal for the USA.	
Rosara Joseph	2006	BCL, DPhil (2011)	Rhodes Scholar from New Zealand. 2005 Oceania Mountain Biking champion. 2006 Melbourne Commonwealth Games Silver medal. 2008 Beijing Olympics Women's Mountainbike Cross-Country 9th.	
Annette Salmeen	1997	DPhil Biochemistry (2001)	Rhodes Scholar. 1996 Atlanta Olympics Swimming (800m freestyle relay) Gold medal for the USA.	

== Others ==
- Robert G. W. Anderson, museum curator
- Cyril Beeson, entomologist and forest conservator
- Arthur Bell, consultant paediatrician
- Trevor Bench-Capon, computer scientist
- Sarah-Jayne Blakemore, scientist
- Paula Booth - Daniell Chair of Chemistry at King's College London
- Ian Bostridge, tenor
- Christopher Brewin
- Hector Catling, archaeologist
- Winston Churchill
- Jared Cohen, Director of Google Ideas think-tank
- Victoria Coren Mitchell, television presenter and poker player
- Giovanni Costigan, British-American historian
- John Cottingham
- Tom Crawford, British mathematician and YouTuber
- Reginald de Koven
- Andrew Dilnot
- Henry Ellis, librarian
- Reginald John Farrer
- Antony Flew, philosopher
- Robert Fludd
- Paul Grice, philosopher (fellow 1939–1967, not an alumnus)
- Ronald Gurner
- Tyrone Guthrie, theatre director and producer
- Peter Hacker, philosopher (fellow 1966–2006, not an alumnus)
- Ralph Hartley
- Paul M. Hayes (1942–1995), historian
- Eric Heaton
- Gilbert Highet
- Alastair Humphreys, adventurer
- Roger Howell, Jr.
- Frank Kearton, Baron Kearton
- Patrick Kennedy
- Jason Kingsley, Rebellion Developments co-founder
- Belinda Kirk, explorer
- Basil Lam, musicologist
- Alexander Leeper, Australian educationist
- Henry Longueville Mansel
- Mohammed Mamdani, social entrepreneur
- Sir John Marsham, 1st Baronet
- Edward Maufe, architect and designer
- Kate Montgomery, artist
- Gilbert Murray, classical scholar
- Yannis Philippakis, lead singer of British indie rock band Foals (band)
- Alfred W. Pollard
- Quilla Constance, aka Jennifer Allen, fine artist
- William Mitchell Ramsay
- Sanjeev Sanyal, writer and economist
- Faiza Shaheen, economist
- Peter Frederick Strawson, philosopher
- Jethro Tull, agriculturist
- Sundeep Waslekar, Founder and President of Strategic Foresight Group think-tank
- Stephen Wolfram

== Fictional ==
- Inspector Morse, fictional TV crime series character, suggested to have won a scholarship
