= Hamilton Whyte =

Former British Diplomat (1927 - 1990)

British High Commissioner to Nigeria
- In office 1983–1984
- Monarch: Elizabeth II
- Prime Minister: Margaret Thatcher
- Preceded by: Mervyn Brown
- Succeeded by: Martin Ewans

British High Commissioner to Singapore
- In office 1985–1987
- Monarch: Elizabeth II
- Prime Minister: Margaret Thatcher
- Preceded by: Peter Moon
- Succeeded by: Michael Pike

Personal details
- Born: 28 May 1927
- Died: 20 July 1990 (aged 63)

(William Erskine) Hamilton Whyte KCMG (28 May 1927 - 20 July 1990) was a British former diplomat who was most notable for being the High Commissioner to Nigeria during the Dikko affair.

== Education ==
Whyte was educated at King's School, Bruton; and Queens' College, Cambridge.

== Career ==
After wartime service in the Royal Navy he joined the War Office and then, in 1952, the Diplomatic Service. Whyte served in Vienna, Bangkok, New York and Kinshasa. He was Director-General of British Information Services; and then Head of the News Department at the Foreign Office from 1976 to 1979. He was Minister (Economic and Social Affairs) for the UK Mission to the UN from 1979 to 1981; Deputy Permanent Representative to the UN from 1981 to 1983; High Commissioner in Nigeria and Ambassador (non-resident) to Benin from 1983 to84; and High Commissioner in Singapore from 1985 to 1987.

Diplomatic posts
Preceded by Mervyn Brown	British High Commissioner to Nigeria; 1983–1984	Succeeded by Martin Ewans
Preceded by Peter Moon	British High Commissioner to Singapore; 1985–1987	Succeeded by Michael Pike
