= Arthur Kellas =

British diplomat (1915–2007)

Arthur Kellas CMG

British High Commissioner to Tanzania
- In office 1972–1974
- Preceded by: Sir Horace Phillips
- Succeeded by: Sir Mervyn Brown

British Ambassador to People's Democratic Republic of Yemen (South Yemen)
- In office 1970–1972
- Preceded by: Post established
- Succeeded by: Granville Ramage

British Ambassador to Nepal
- In office 1966–1970
- Preceded by: Sir Antony Duff
- Succeeded by: Terence O'Brien

Personal details
- Born: 6 May 1915 Scotland
- Died: 6 March 2007 (aged 91)
- Children: 3
- Education: University of Aberdeen
- Occupation: Diplomat

Arthur Roy Handasyde Kellas (6 May 1915 – 6 March 2007) was a British diplomat who served as ambassador to Nepal from 1966 to 1970, ambassador to People's Democratic Republic of Yemen (South Yemen) from 1970 to 1972 and high commissioner to Tanzania from 1972 to 1974.

== Early life and education ==
Kellas was born in Scotland on 6 May 1915, the second son of Henry Kallas and Mary Kellas (née Brown) of Aberdeen. He was educated at Aberdeen Grammar School, University of Aberdeen and Balliol College, Oxford.

== Career ==
Kellas entered the diplomatic service in 1939. After the outbreak of World War II that year, he was commissioned into the Border Regiment, and later served with the 1st Battalion, Parachute Regiment. He was mentioned twice in despatches.

In 1944, Kellas was posted to Tehran as third secretary and in the following year was promoted to second secretary. In 1948, he was sent as first secretary to Helsingfors. From 1951 to 1952, he served as first secretary (press) at Cairo, and during his posting was declared persona non grata on the grounds that his activities were against the interests of the Egyptian regime, a charge denied by the British government. Then from 1954 to 1958, he served as first secretary at Baghdad. After promotion to counsellor, he was sent to Tehran and remained in the post until 1963 when he spent a year at Imperial Defence College.

From 1964 to 1965, he was counsellor and consul-general at Tel Aviv. He then served as ambassador to Nepal from 1966 to 1970; ambassador to People's Democratic Republic of Yemen (South Yemen) from 1970 to 1972, and high commissioner to Tanzania from 1972 to 1974.

== Personal life and death ==
From 1975 to 1979, Kellas served as president of the Britain-Nepal Society.

He married Katharine Bridget, daughter of John Le Rougetel, in 1952, and they had two sons and a daughter.

Kellas died on 6 March 2007, aged 91.

== Honours ==
Kellas was appointed Companion of the Order of St Michael and St George (CMG) in the 1964 New Year Honours.

== Publications ==
- Down to Earth (war memoir of parachute subaltern), 1990.
- Ready Steady Go (pre-war reminiscences), 1999.

== See also ==
- Tanzania–United Kingdom relations
- Yemen–United Kingdom relations
- Nepal–United Kingdom relations

Diplomatic posts
Preceded by Sir Antony Duff	British Ambassador to Nepal; 1966–1970	Succeeded by Terence O'Brien
New office	British Ambassador to People's Democratic Republic of Yemen (South Yemen); 1970–1972	Succeeded by Granville Ramage
Preceded by Sir Horace Phillips	British High Commissioner to Tanzania; 1972–1974	Succeeded by Sir Mervyn Brown
