= Dianna Melrose =

British diplomat

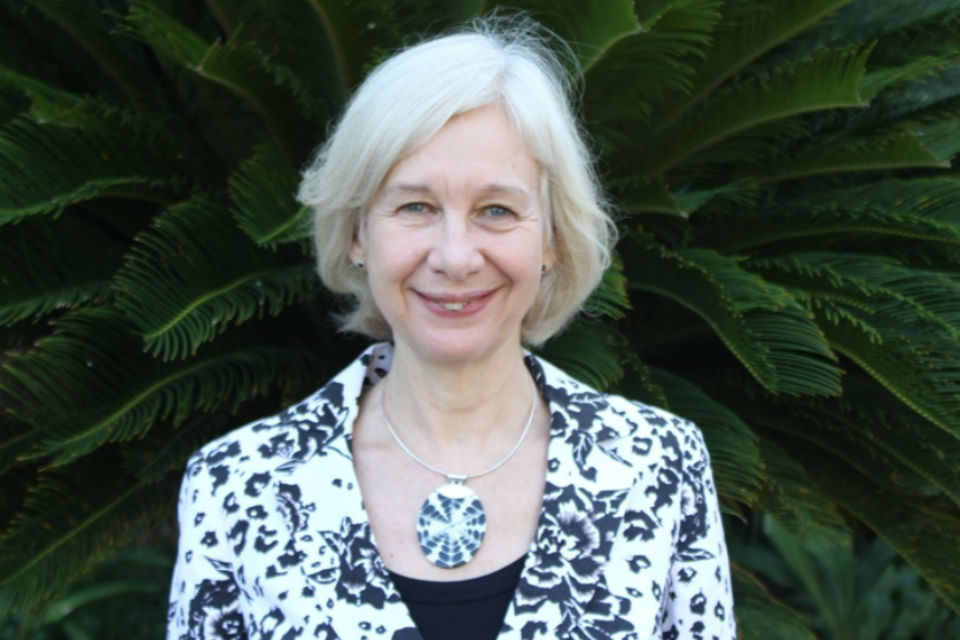

British Ambassador to Cuba
- In office 2008–2012
- Monarch: Elizabeth II
- Prime Minister: David Cameron

Dianna Melrose (born 24 June 1952 in Bulawayo, Southern Rhodesia (now Zimbabwe)) is a British diplomat who has served as the British High Commissioner to Tanzania and as the British Ambassador to Cuba.

== Career ==
Dianna Patricia Melrose was educated at St Catherine's School, Bramley, King's College London (BA, Spanish & French) and the Institute of Latin American Studies, University of London. She worked as a Spanish interpreter in the City of London, then briefly for the British Council, before joining Oxfam in 1980. She was Policy Director of Oxfam GB, 1993–99. She then joined the Foreign and Commonwealth Office (FCO) as Deputy Head, then Head, of its Policy Planning Staff. She was seconded to the Department for International Development (DFID) in 2002, first as head of its Extractive Industries Unit (an initiative by Prime Minister Tony Blair aimed at ensuring that the people of oil-, gas- and minerals-producing countries benefit from the revenues) and then as head of DFID's International Trade Department. In 2006 she returned to the FCO as head of its EU Enlargement and Southeast Europe group before being posted as Ambassador to Cuba in 2008. She left Cuba in July 2012 and was appointed High Commissioner to Tanzania in February 2013.

Diplomatic posts
Preceded by John Dew	British Ambassador to Cuba; 2008–2012	Succeeded by Tim Cole
Preceded by Diane Corner	British High Commissioner to Tanzania; 2013–2016	Succeeded by Sarah Cooke

== Oxfam ==
- The Great Health Robbery: Baby Milk and Medicines in Yemen, Oxfam, Oxford, 1981. ISBN 0855980540
- Bitter Pills: Medicines and the Third World Poor, Oxfam, Oxford, 1982. ISBN 0855980656
- In 1984, Health Action International produced a video, Hard to Swallow, in collaboration with Oxfam about the experiences of Melrose of pharmaceutical sales rep practices in Peru.
- Nicaragua: The threat of a good example?, Oxfam, Oxford, 1985. ISBN 0855980702
