= Robert Dewar (diplomat) =

British diplomat

Robert Dewar CMG
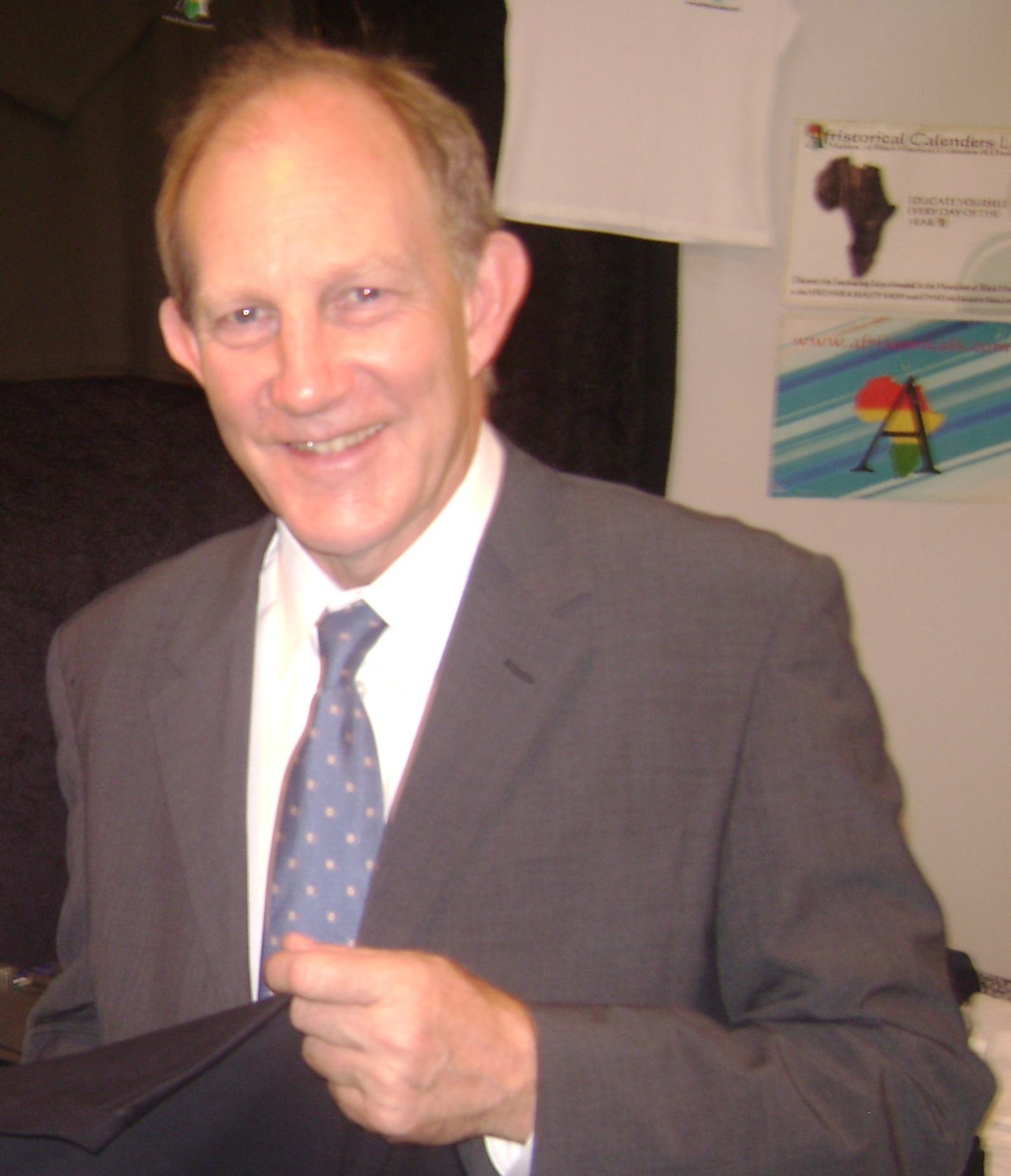
- Robert Dewar in Lagos in 2008

British High Commissioner to Nigeria and Permanent Representative to ECOWAS
- In office 2007 – 2011
- Preceded by: Richard Gozney
- Succeeded by: Andrew Lloyd

British Ambassador to Ethiopia and Permanent Representative to the African Union
- In office 2004 – 2007
- Preceded by: Myles Wickstead (not to African Union)
- Succeeded by: Norman Ling (also to Djibouti)

British High Commissioner to Mozambique
- In office 2000 – 2003
- Preceded by: Bernard Everett
- Succeeded by: Howard Parkinson

British Ambassador to Madagascar
- In office 1996 – 1999
- Preceded by: Peter Smith
- Succeeded by: Charles Mochan

Personal details
- Born: Robert Scott Dewar; 10 June 1949 (age 76)
- Spouse: Jennifer Mary Ward
- Occupation: Diplomat

Robert Scott Dewar CMG (born 10 June 1949), is a retired British diplomat. He was the British ambassador of Ethiopia and Madagascar and the High Commissioner to Mozambique and Nigeria.

He has served as the UK Permanent Representative to the African Union (2004-2006) and the UK Permanent Representative to the Economic Community of West African States (2007-2011). He was a member of board of trustees of the British Red Cross until 2019. He was made a member of the Order of St Michael and St George in 2006.
