= Ramsay Melhuish =

British diplomat (1932–2023)

Sir Ramsay Melhuish KBE CMG

British Ambassador to Thailand
- In office 1989–1992
- Preceded by: Derek Tonkin
- Succeeded by: Christian Adams

British High Commissioner to Zimbawbe
- In office 1985–1989
- Preceded by: Sir Martin Ewans
- Succeeded by: Sir Keiran Prendergast

British Ambassador to Kuwait
- In office 1982–1985
- Preceded by: Sydney Cambridge
- Succeeded by: Sir Peter Moon

Personal details
- Born: 17 March 1932
- Died: 26 May 2023 (aged 91)
- Children: 4
- Education: St John's College, Oxford
- Occupation: Diplomat

Sir Michael Ramsay Melhuish (17 March 1932 – 26 May 2023) was a British diplomat who served as ambassador to Kuwait from 1982 to 1985, high commissioner to Zimbabwe from 1985 to 1989, and ambassador to Thailand from 1989 to 1992.

== Early life and education ==
Melhuish was born on 17 March 1932, the son of Henry Whitfield Melhuish and Jeanette Ramsay Pender Melhuish. He was educated at Royal Masonic School for Boys, Bushey, and St John's College, Oxford.

== Career ==
Melhuish entered the Foreign Office in 1955, and was transferred to the Middle East Centre for Arab Studies (MECAS). In 1957, he was posted to Bahrain as third secretary and then, after two years in the Foreign Office, he was sent to Singapore in 1961 as second secretary. After being promoted to first secretary, in 1963 he was posted to Prague where he also served as consul. In 1966, he was first secretary and head of chancery in Bahrain; in 1968 he was first secretary at Washington; and in 1970, counsellor at Amman. In 1976, he was head of the North America Department at the Foreign and Commonwealth Office.

From 1979 to 1982, he served as counsellor at Warsaw. In 1982, he was appointed Ambassador to Kuwait, a post he held until 1985 when he was appointed High Commissioner to Zimbabwe, remaining in the post until 1989. From 1989 to 1992, he served as Ambassador to Thailand. From July to December 1992, he was head of the European Union Monitoring Mission in the former Yugoslavia based in Zagreb.

He retired from the Diplomatic Service in 1993.

== Personal life and death ==
Melhuish married Stella Phillips in 1961 and they had two sons and two daughters.

Melhuish died on 26 May 2023, aged 91.

== Honours ==
Melhuish was appointed Knight Commander of the Order of the British Empire (KBE) in the 1993 New Year Honours. He was appointed Companion of the Order of St Michael and St George (CMG) in the 1982 Birthday Honours.

== See also ==
- Thailand–United Kingdom relations
- Zimbabwe–United Kingdom relations
- Kuwait–United Kingdom relations

Diplomatic posts
Preceded by Sydney Cambridge	British Ambassador to Kuwait; 1982–1985	Succeeded by Sir Peter Moon
Preceded by Sir Martin Ewans	British High Commissioner to Zimbawbe; 1985–1989	Succeeded by Sir Keiran Prendergast
Preceded by Derek Tonkin	British Ambassador to Thailand; 1989–1992	Succeeded by Christian Adams
