= Mochan =

Mochan may refer to:

- Mochan, Iran, a village in Razavi Khorasan Province, Iran
- Mochan (lake), a body of water in Bagansky District, Novosibirsk Oblast, Russia

People with the surname

- Charles Mochan, Scottish footballer
- Carol Mochan, (b. 1970), Scottish Politician
- Dennis Mochan (b. 1935), Scottish footballer
- Neil Mochan (1927–1994), Scottish footballer
- Scot Mochan DJ, Producer, Actor

People with the first name

- Mochan Anil, Human
