= Gordon Duggan =

British diplomat (1937–1998)

Gordon Aldridge Duggan CMG

High Commissioner of the United Kingdom to Singapore
- In office 1990–1997
- Preceded by: Michael Pike
- Succeeded by: Alan Hunt

Personal details
- Born: 12 August 1937
- Died: 22 October 1998 (aged 61) Cornwall
- Children: 3
- Education: Lincoln College, Oxford
- Occupation: Diplomat

Gordon Aldridge Duggan (12 August 1937 – 22 October 1998) was a British diplomat. He served as High Commissioner of the United Kingdom to Singapore from 1991 to 1997.

== Early life and education ==
Duggan was born on 12 August 1937, the son of Joseph Duggan and Elizabeth Aldridge. He was educated at Liverpool Collegiate School and Lincoln College, Oxford.

== Career ==
Duggan joined the Foreign Office in 1963 and served in Canberra (1966–69); in Bonn (1972–1974), and then as First Secretary and Head of Chancery, Jakarta (1974–1976) and as First Secretary in Canberra (1976–1979). He was Consul-General in Zurich (1984–85) and then Consul-General in Liechtenstein (1985–1988). After he was Head of the Commercial Management and Exports Department at the Foreign and Commonwealth Office (1988–89), and then seconded as Director of Project Development to Northern Engineering Industries (1989–90), he served as High Commissioner of the United Kingdom to Singapore (1991–1997). While in office he was instrumental in establishing the Singapore British Business Council. After retiring from the diplomatic service he held various directorships and advisory roles in the private sector.

== Personal life and death ==
Duggan married Erica Anderssen in 1969 and they had a son and two daughters.

Duggan died after being ill for some time on 22 October 1998 in Cornwall, aged 61.

== Honours ==
Duggan was appointed Companion of the Order of St Michael and St George (CMG) in the 1996 Birthday Honours.

Diplomatic posts
Preceded by Michael Pike	High Commissioner of the United Kingdom to Singapore; 1990–1997	Succeeded by Alan Hunt
