= Kieran Prendergast =

Sir Walter Kieran Prendergast KCVO CMG (born 2 July 1942) is a British retired diplomat who was Under-Secretary-General for Political Affairs at the United Nations.

Prendergast was born in Campbeltown, Scotland, and received his education at St Patrick's College, Strathfield in Sydney, Australia. He later went to England and attended Salesian College in Chertsey and then St Edmund Hall, Oxford.

After graduation, Prendergast was a Turkish language student with the FCO in Istanbul 1964–65, after which he joined the British Embassy in Ankara, Turkey for two years, until 1967, when he was posted to the NATO Department at the British Foreign Office. He later worked with the foreign service in Nicosia, Cyprus, and The Hague. In 1976, he returned to London as Assistant Private Secretary to Anthony Crosland and David Owen, Secretaries of State for Foreign and Commonwealth Affairs. From 1979 to 1982, Prendergast worked in New York with Anthony Parsons as part of the United Kingdom Mission to the United Nations. In 1982, he was appointed Head of Chancery and Consul-General in Tel Aviv, Israel and worked there for four years, later serving as High Commissioner to Zimbabwe and Kenya, before returning to Ankara, this time as Ambassador to Turkey.

In March 1997, United Nations Secretary General Kofi Annan appointed Prendergast Under-Secretary-General for Political Affairs at the United Nations and Prendergast served in that position until July 2005. He helped call attention to human rights violations and "ethnic cleansing" resulting from the War in Darfur, and was deeply involved in Cyprus reunification negotiations in 2004, following the Cypriot Annan Plan referendum. He was determined that a solution could be found to problems in Somalia. When he retired in 2005, following pressure from the Bush administration for the removal of key UN Secretariat officials who had opposed the Iraq war and the many subsequent errors of policy, Kofi Annan thanked him for his "outstanding service" and "invaluable advice." He was succeeded by Ibrahim Gambari.

Since his retirement from the United Nations, Prendergast has conducted research at the Belfer Center for Science and International Affairs and is a member of the Advisory Council of Independent Diplomat. He speaks both French and Turkish fluently, and is married with four children.

Prendergast is chairman of the Anglo-Turkish Society, a trustee of the Beit Trust, and senior adviser at the Geneva-based Centre for Humanitarian Dialogue, as well as being counsellor at Melbourne-based Dragoman Global. He is also on the advisory board of Albany Associates, providing comprehensive communication strategies and solutions in challenging and transitional environments. Prendergast is the president of The British Association of Former United Nations Civil Servants.

Diplomatic posts
Preceded by Sir Ramsay Melhuish	British High Commissioner to Zimbabwe; 1989–1992	Succeeded by Sir Richard Dales
Preceded by Sir Roger Tomkys	British High Commissioner to Kenya; 1992–1995	Succeeded by Simon Hemans
Preceded by John Goulden	British Ambassador to Turkey; 1995–1997	Succeeded by Sir David Logan
Preceded by Marrack Goulding	Under-Secretary-General of the United Nations for Department of Political Affairs; 1997–2005	Succeeded by Ibrahim Gambari
