= Alan Hunt (diplomat) =

Former British diplomat

Alan Hunt CMG

British High Commissioner to Singapore
- In office 1997–2001
- Preceded by: Gordon Duggan
- Succeeded by: Sir Stephen Brown

Personal details
- Born: 5 March 1941 (age 85)
- Education: University of East Anglia (BA)

Alan Charles Hunt CMG (born 5 March 1941) is a former British diplomat.

He was educated at Latymer Upper School and at the University of East Anglia, where he obtained a first class degree in European studies. He was Counsellor and then Charge d’Affaires in Argentina between 1987 and 1990, during a period in which diplomatic relations between the two countries were severed following the Falklands War. He served as British High Commissioner to Singapore from 1997 to 2001. He was appointed a Companion of the Order of St Michael and St George (CMG) in 1990.

== Honours ==
- Companion of the Order of St Michael and St George (CMG) - 1990
