= Arthur de la Mare =

Sir Arthur James de la Mare KCMG KCVO (15 February 1914 – 15 December 1994) was a British diplomat. He rose to the rank of High Commissioner of Singapore, and was a leading authority on Asian affairs to the British Foreign Office.

== Life and career ==
Arthur James de la Mare was born into a farming family in Saint John, Jersey. He grew up speaking the Norman French patois of his native island. He was educated at Victoria College, Jersey, then won a scholarship to Pembroke College, Cambridge, where he gained a double first in modern languages.

He joined the Diplomatic Service in 1936 and was posted to Tokyo, then to Seoul in 1938. Upon his arrival in Seoul he was acting consul general, and when the vice consul promptly retired, De la Mare took on his responsibilities as well, although he had no consular training at this stage. He was later appointed head of the Far Eastern department of the Foreign Office.

Other overseas appointments included San Francisco 1947–50, Tokyo 1951–53 and Washington 1956–60. He was appointed ambassador to Afghanistan 1963–65, High Commissioner in Singapore 1968–70 and ambassador to Thailand 1970–73.

De la Mare oversaw the transition to independence from Britain whilst High Commissioner for Singapore. He expressed his anger that the British military bases on the island were handed over to the Singapore People's Action Party government. His valedictory dispatches from Thailand and Singapore are included in Matthew Parris's book Parting Shots (Penguin, 2011). In a view that was considered old-fashioned at the time, De la Mare maintained that the British Empire could be a force for good around the world.

De la Mare was appointed a Companion of the Order of St Michael and St George (CMG) in 1957, and Knight Commander of the same order (KCMG) in 1968. After the Queen's visit to Thailand in 1972 he was made a Knight Commander of the Royal Victorian Order (KCVO) and the King of Thailand made him a Knight Grand Cross of the Order of the White Elephant.

He lived in the 1960s and 1970s in Walton on Thames, Surrey. He had an impish sense of humour. One of his neighbours saw Sir Arthur, shabbily dressed, doing the gardening in 1965. Assuming he was a hired hand, The neighbour asked him whether he would be willing to do the gardening at his house. Sir Arthur readily agreed. It took him some weeks to reveal to his neighbour that he was the ex-ambassador to Afghanistan and a Knight of the realm.

De la Mare had retired to his native Jersey by 1991.

== Publications ==
- de la Mare, Sir Arthur Perverse and Foolish: A Jersey farmer's Son in the British Diplomatic Service, La Haule Books, Jersey, 1994 ISBN 0861200462

Diplomatic posts
Preceded by Sir Michael Gillett	Ambassador Extraordinary and Plenipotentiary at Kabul; 1963–1965	Succeeded by Sir Gordon Whitteridge
Preceded by John Vernon Rob	High Commissioner to Singapore; 1968–1970	Succeeded by Sir Samuel Falle
Preceded by Sir Neil Pritchard	Ambassador Extraordinary and Plenipotentiary at Bangkok; 1970–1973	Succeeded by Sir David Cole
