= Christian B. Anfinsen =

American biochemist (1916–1995)

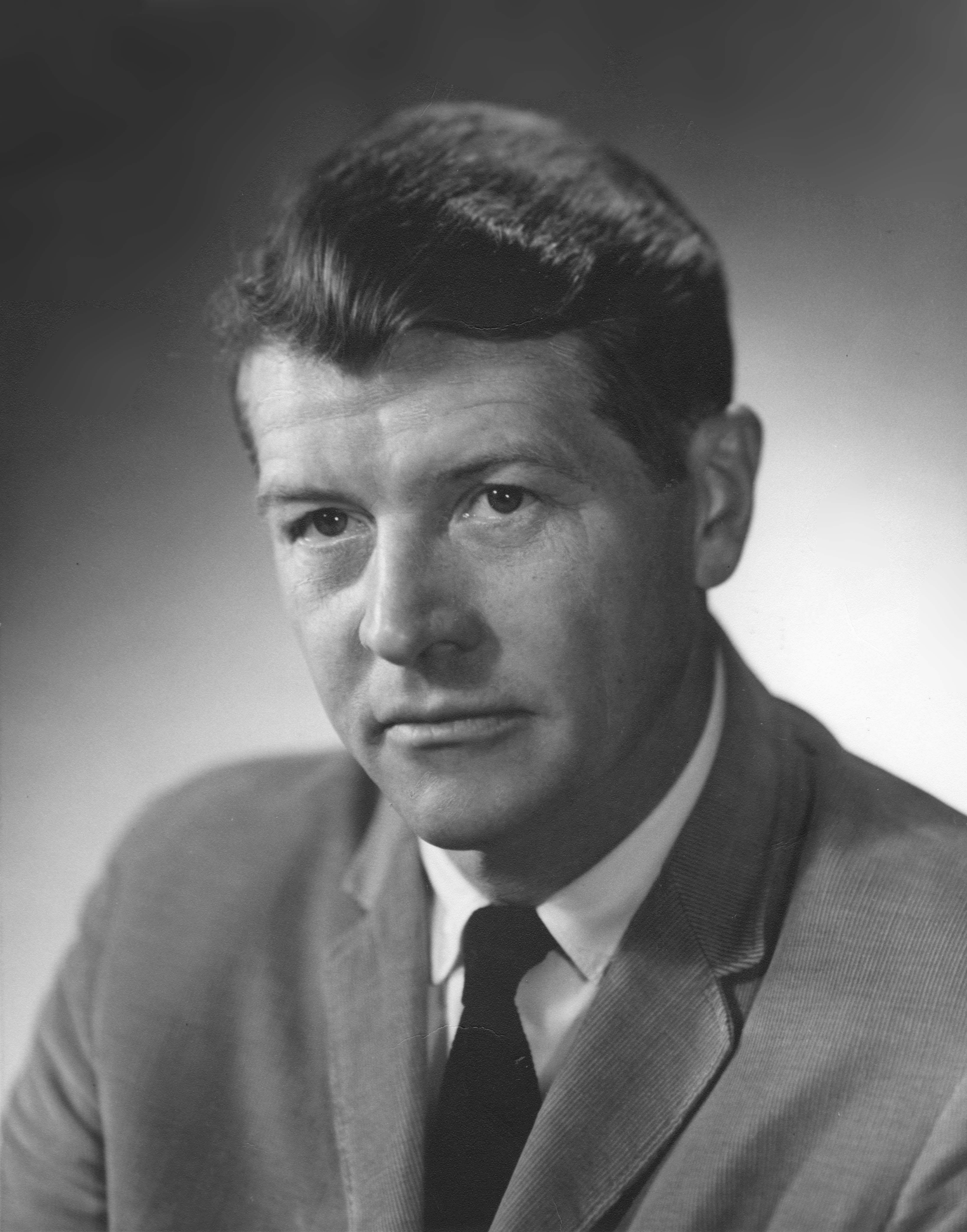
- Anfinsen in 1969
- Born: Christian Boehmer Anfinsen Jr. March 26, 1916; Monessen, Pennsylvania, US
- Died: May 14, 1995 (aged 79); Randallstown, Maryland, US
- Education: Swarthmore College (BA); University of Pennsylvania (MS); Harvard University (PhD)
- Known for: Ribonuclease, Anfinsen's dogma
- Spouses: Florence Kenenger (m. 1941; div. 1978); Libby Shulman Ely (m. 1979)
- Children: 3 with Kenenger, 4 stepchildren with Ely
- Awards: Nobel Prize in Chemistry (1972)
- Scientific career
- Fields: Biochemistry
- Thesis: Quantitative histochemical studies of the retina (1943)
- Doctoral advisor: Albert Baird Hastings

Christian Boehmer Anfinsen Jr. (March 26, 1916 – May 14, 1995) was an American biochemist. He shared the 1972 Nobel Prize in Chemistry with Stanford Moore and William Howard Stein for work on ribonuclease, especially concerning the connection between the amino acid sequence and the biologically active conformation (see Anfinsen's dogma).

== Background ==
Anfinsen was born in Monessen, Pennsylvania, into a family of Norwegian-American immigrants. His parents were Sophie (née Rasmussen) and Christian Boehmer Anfinsen Sr., a mechanical engineer. The family moved to Philadelphia in the 1920s. In 1933, he went to Swarthmore College where he played varsity football and earned a bachelor's degree in chemistry in 1937.

In 1939, he earned a master's degree in organic chemistry from the University of Pennsylvania and was awarded an American-Scandinavian Foundation fellowship to develop new methods for analyzing the chemical structure of complex proteins, namely enzymes, at the Carlsberg Laboratory in Copenhagen, Denmark. In 1941, Anfinsen was offered a university fellowship for doctoral study in the Department of Biological Chemistry at Harvard Medical School where he received his PhD in biochemistry in 1943. During World War II he worked for the Office of Scientific Research and Development.

Anfinsen had three children with his first wife, Florence Kenenger, to whom he was married from 1941 to 1978. In 1979, he married Libby Shulman Ely, with whom he had 4 stepchildren, and converted to Orthodox Judaism. However, Anfinsen wrote in 1987 that "my feelings about religion still very strongly reflect a fifty-year period of orthodox agnosticism."

His papers were donated to the National Library of Medicine by Libby Anfinsen between 1998 and 1999.

== Career ==
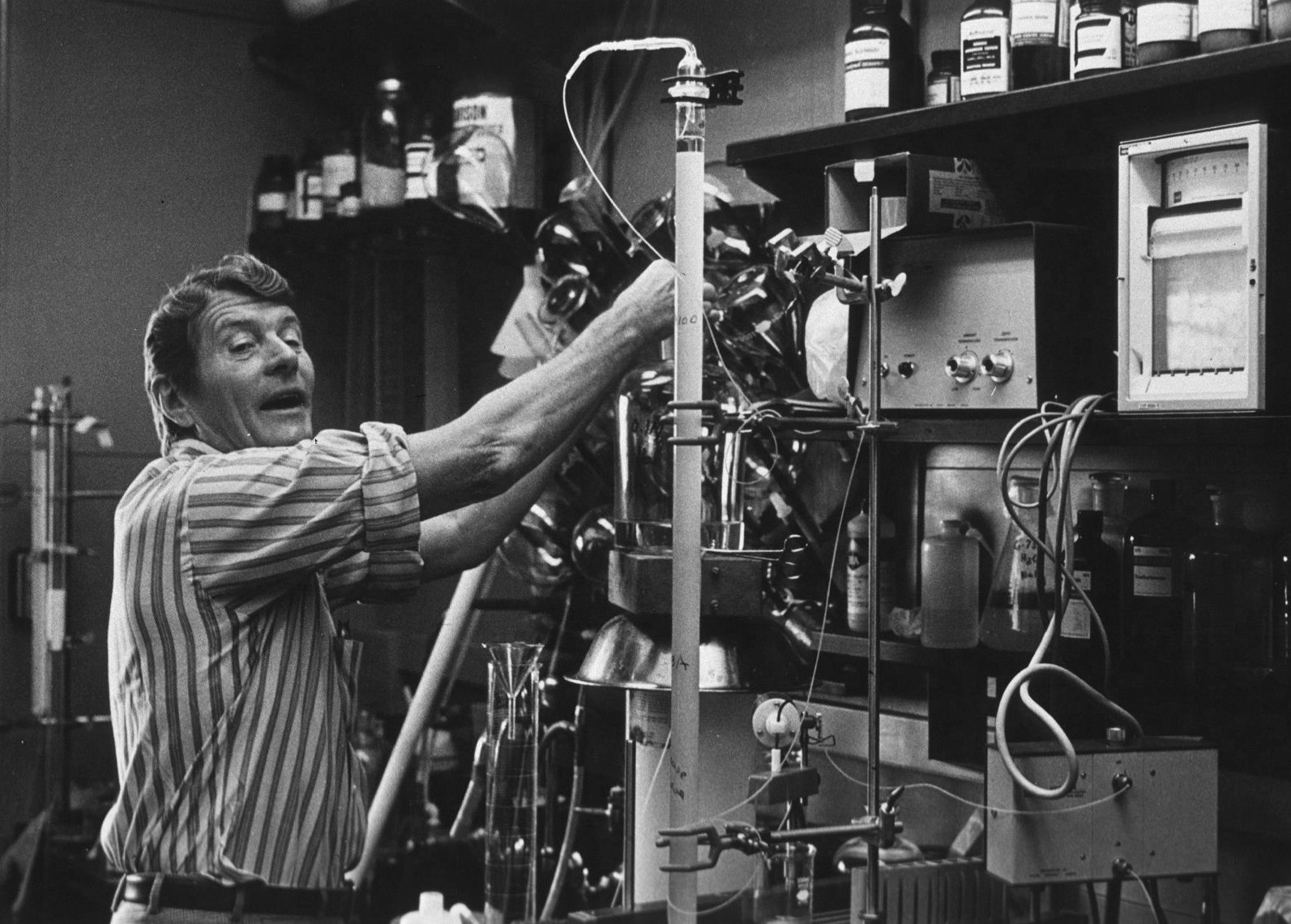
Anfinsen in the lab

In 1950, the National Heart Institute, part of the National Institutes of Health in Bethesda, Maryland, recruited Anfinsen as chief of its laboratory of cell physiology. In 1954, a Rockefeller Foundation fellowship enabled Anfinsen to return to the Carlsberg Laboratory for a year and a Guggenheim Foundation fellowship allowed him to study at the Weizmann Institute of Science in Rehovot, Israel from 1958 to 1959. He was elected a Fellow of the American Academy of Arts and Sciences in 1958.

In 1962, Anfinsen returned to Harvard Medical School as a visiting professor and was invited to become chair of the department of chemistry. He was subsequently appointed chief of the laboratory of chemical biology at the National Institute of Arthritis and Metabolic Diseases (now the National Institute of Arthritis, Diabetes, and Digestive and Kidney Diseases), where he remained until 1981. In 1981, Anfinsen became a founding member of the World Cultural Council. From 1982 until his death in 1995, Anfinsen was Professor of Biology and (Physical) Biochemistry at Johns Hopkins.

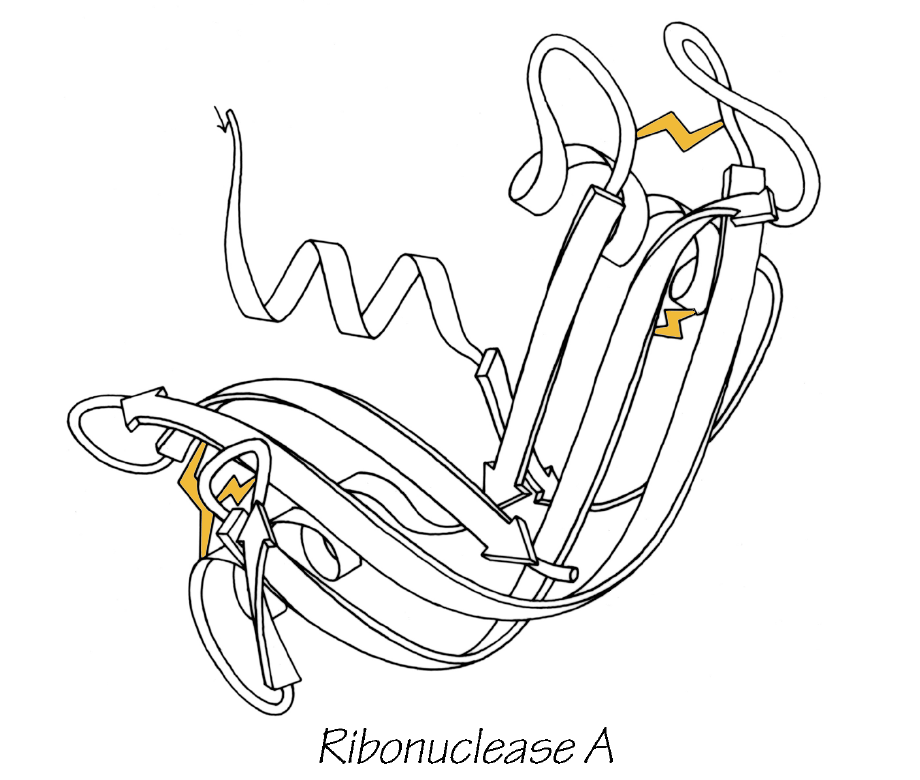
Ribonuclease A 3D structure, with SS bonds in gold

Anfinsen published more than 200 original articles, mostly in the area of the relationships between structure and function in proteins, as well as a book, The Molecular Basis of Evolution (1959), in which he described the relationships between protein chemistry and genetics and the promise those areas held for the understanding of evolution. He was also a pioneer of ideas in the area of nucleic acid compaction. In 1961, he showed that ribonuclease could be refolded after denaturation while preserving enzyme activity, thereby suggesting that all the information required by protein to adopt its final conformation is encoded in its amino-acid sequence. He belonged to the National Academy of Sciences (USA), the Royal Danish Academy of Sciences and Letters and the American Philosophical Society.

== Christian B. Anfinsen Award ==
Established in 1996, The Christian B. Anfinsen Award is presented annually to distinguished scientists, the Awards recognize excellence and outstanding achievements in the multidisciplinary fields of protein science, and honor distinguished contributions in the areas of leadership, education, or service. It is sponsored by the Protein Society, and recognizes significant technical achievements in the field of protein science.

Past recipients of the Christian B. Anfinsen Award include:

- Donald Hunt (1996)
- Wayne Hendrickson (1997)
- James A. Wells (1998)
- Alan Fersht (1999)
- Stephen Benkovic (2000)
- Martin Karplus (2001)
- Roger Tsien (2002)
- Ada Yonath (2003)
- Meir Wilchek (2004)
- Matthias Mann (2005)
- John R. Yates, III (2006)
- Carl Frieden (2007)
- Carol V. Robinson (2008)
- Wayne Hubbell (2009)
- Yoshinori Fujiyoshi (2010)
- D. Wayne Bolen (2011)
- Barry H. Honig (2012)
- Tom Alber (2013)
- Robert Tycko (2014)
- Sachdev Sidhu (2015)
- Andreas Plückthun (2016)
- Lewis E. Kay (2017)
- Yifan Cheng (2018)
- Anthony Kossiakoff (2019)
- Stephen Sligar (2020)
- Petra Fromme (2021)
- Jin Zhang (2022)
- Mei Hong (2023)
- Neil Kelleher (2024)
- Jan Steyaert (2025)
- Paula Booth (2026)

== Selected works ==
- The Molecular Basis of Evolution (1959)
- Editor, Advances in Protein Chemistry

== See also ==
- Anfinsen cage
- Anfinsen's dogma
- List of Jewish Nobel laureates
