= List of ambassadors of the United Kingdom to Zimbabwe =

The ambassador of the United Kingdom to the Republic of Zimbabwe is the United Kingdom's foremost diplomatic representative in Zimbabwe, and head of the UK's diplomatic mission in Harare.

The embassy dates back to the establishment of a high commission in Salisbury, Southern Rhodesia, to the Federation of Rhodesia and Nyasaland from 1955 to 1963, and to Southern Rhodesia again following the end of the Federation from 1963. The high commission was withdrawn on 12 November 1965, following the Unilateral Declaration of Independence of Rhodesia the previous day. Zimbabwe became an independent nation in 1980 following the Lancaster House Agreement on 21 December 1979. Initially, Zimbabwe was a member of the Commonwealth of Nations so the UK's diplomatic representatives were high commissioners. Zimbabwe withdrew from the Commonwealth in 2003 and since then the UK's representatives have been ambassadors.

Emmerson Mnangagwa, the president of Zimbabwe has stated that Zimbabwe will seek a return to its membership of the Commonwealth during 2018, following in the footsteps of The Gambia, which returned to its status as a republic in the Commonwealth of Nations on 8 February 2018. If this does occur, then the UK's head of mission in Zimbabwe will again be a high commissioner.

== List of heads of mission ==
=== High commissioners ===
==== Federation of Rhodesia and Nyasaland ====
- 1955–1961: Maurice Rupert Metcalf
- 1961–1963: Lord Alport
- 1963–1963: John Baines Johnston

==== Southern Rhodesia ====
- 1963–1965: John Baines Johnston

==== Zimbabwe ====
- 1980–1983: Robin Byatt
- 1983–1985: Sir Martin Ewans
- 1985–1989: Sir Ramsay Melhuish
- 1989–1992: Sir Keiran Prendergast
- 1992–1995: Sir Richard Dales
- 1995–1998: Martin Williams
- 1998–2001: Peter Longworth
- 2001–2003: Sir Brian Donnelly

=== Ambassadors to Zimbabwe ===
- 2003–2004: Sir Brian Donnelly
- 2004–2006: Roderick Pullen
- 2006–2009: Andrew Pocock
- 2009–2011: Mark Canning
- 2011–2014: Deborah Bronnert
- 2014–2018: Catriona Laing
- 2019–2023: Melanie Robinson
- 2023–2026: Peter Vowles
- 2026–present: Gill Lever

== Controversy ==
Ambassador Pocock, along with other foreign diplomats, was seized and threatened by Zimbabwe police briefly on 13 May 2008 while they tried to investigate violence against Zimbabwe's rural population since the March 2008 elections.
