= John Vernon Rob =

- Born: 17 December 1915; Chertsey, Surrey, England
- Died: 7 March 1971 (aged 55); Wandsworth, London, England
- Occupation: Diplomat

John Vernon Rob CMG (17 December 1915 - 7 March 1971) was a British diplomat and the first British High Commissioner to Singapore.

Rob was born in Chertsey, Surrey and educated at Hordle House School, Oundle School and St John's College, Cambridge. In 1939 he joined the Consular Service but in September 1940 he enlisted on the Scots Guards. Rob was seriously wounded in 1945 in Italy.

Rob returned to the Foreign Office at the end of the war becoming deputy head of the News Department for three years, he later became a Counsellor in New Delhi and Warsaw. Between 1960 and 1962 he was the British ambassador to the Central African Republic, Chad, Gabon and Congo.

In 1965 Rob was appointed Deputy High Commissioner in Singapore, becoming the High Commissioner when Singapore became independent of Malaysia. He returned to the United Kingdom in 1969 due to ill health and acted as a part-time advisior to the Foreign Office Research Department.

Diplomatic posts
Preceded by New Position	British High Commissioner to Singapore; 1965–1967	Succeeded by Sir Arthur de la Mare
