= John Baines Johnston =

British diplomat

Sir John Baines Johnston GCMG KCVO (13 May 1918 – 16 October 2005) was a British diplomat. He is best known for being Britain's High Commissioner to Rhodesia when that colony made its Unilateral Declaration of Independence in November 1965.

== Early career ==
Johnston was born at Maryport, Cumberland, the son of a Baptist clergyman, and was educated at Banbury Grammar School and The Queen's College, Oxford. He served with the Gordon Highlanders in the Second World War.

In 1947 Johnston joined the British Colonial Office, and three years later was sent to the Gold Coast (now Ghana) for 18 months before returning to London, where he was appointed principal private secretary to the Secretary of State for the Colonies, Oliver Lyttelton. His duties included working on the new Nigerian constitution and the future of the Federation of Rhodesia and Nyasaland.

In 1956–57, Johnston was head of the Far Eastern Department of the Colonial Office, concerned with delivering independence to Malaya and the future of Singapore. He then transferred to the Commonwealth Relations Office (CRO), where he was head of the Defence and Western Department before being appointed deputy high commissioner in South Africa in 1959.

In 1961 he was appointed High Commissioner to Sierra Leone, then in 1963 he was appointed High Commissioner to the Federation of Rhodesia and Nyasaland, which was dissolved on 31 December. He then became the high commissioner to (Southern) Rhodesia.

== Rhodesia ==
Johnston had to deal with what he described as "hardcore racialists" in the Rhodesian Front government (under Ian Smith), as well as with the African nationalists leaders Joshua Nkomo and the Rev Ndabaningi Sithole.

As far as Rhodesia was concerned, Johnston had to try to convince the Rhodesian Front that the British government could not allow independence without firm guarantees that the African population would make rapid progress to the management of their own affairs (whites made up only 7% of the population, but had control of the government). For a year he was the "middleman" as Britain and Rhodesia attempted to hammer out a constitutional basis for independence, with Britain insisting on eventual majority rule.

Johnston's view of Ian Smith (Rhodesia's prime minister), was uncompromising: "a dour, humourless man who could see no point of view but his own". But for a time Johnston believed that, if negotiations continued, the threat of UDI (Unilateral Declaration of Independence) might be averted.

So tense was the atmosphere in the Rhodesian capital, Salisbury, that Johnston found it impossible to establish relaxed friendships. For his part, Smith found Johnston a "strange man" to deal with.

On 11 November 1965 Smith declared UDI, and Johnston was withdrawn the next day.

== Career after UDI ==
Johnston had a period as Assistant Under-Secretary at the Commonwealth Office, in charge of information services and relations with India and Pakistan; he was then Deputy Under-Secretary in charge of Africa during the time of the Nigerian Civil War.

In 1971 he was appointed High Commissioner to Malaysia, whose independence constitution he had helped to negotiate earlier in his career; he had also represented the British government at the independence celebrations.

His final posting was as High Commissioner to Canada (1974–78).

From 1978 to 1985, he was a Governor of the BBC.

== Honours ==
- United Kingdom :
  - Companion of the Order of St Michael and St George (CMG) (1962 New Year Honours)
  - Knight Commander of the Order of St Michael and St George (KCMG) (1966 New Year Honours)
  - Knight Commander of the Royal Victorian Order (KCVO) (1972) following The Queen's state visit to Malaysia
  - Knight Grand Cross of the Order of St Michael and St George (GCMG) (1978 New Year Honours)
- Malaysia :
  - Honorary Commander of the Order of the Defender of the Realm (P.M.N.) (1972)

== See also ==
Diplomatic posts
Preceded by New post	High Commissioner to Sierra Leone; 1961 – 1963	Succeeded by Desmond Crawley
Preceded by Baron Alport	High Commissioner to Rhodesia and Nyasaland; 1963	Succeeded by Post Abolished
Preceded by New Post	High Commissioner to Southern Rhodesia; 1963 – 1965	Succeeded by Post Abolished
Preceded by Sir Michael Walker	High Commissioner to Malaysia; 1971 – 1974	Succeeded by Sir Eric Norris
Preceded by Sir Peter Hayman	High Commissioner to Canada; 1974 – 1978	Succeeded by Sir John Ford
