= Philip Thomas (diplomat) =

British diplomat (born 1948)

Sir Philip Lloyd Thomas, KCVO, CMG (born 1948) is a retired British diplomat.

Thomas graduated from St John's College, Cambridge, and entered HM Diplomatic Service in 1972, being appointed Third Secretary at the Foreign and Commonwealth Office (FCO).

In 1974, he was posted to the British Embassy in Belgrade as a Second Secretary, but returned to the FCO three years later. In 1981, he was appointed First Secretary at the British Embassy in Madrid. He then served with the United Kingdom's representation to the European Communities from 1987 to 1989. After two years in the Cabinet Office, he was a Counsellor in the British Embassy in Washington from 1991 to 1996, when he became Head of the Eastern Department at the FCO. In 1999, he was appointed British Consul-General in Düsseldorf, and in 2001 High Commissioner to Nigeria in succession to Sir Graham Burton. He spent two years as the British Consul-General in New York (2004–06), before leaving the service; he was succeeded as Consul-General by Sir Alan Collins.

The last nine years of his career was spent in the private sector in advisory roles with Shell and Permian Global.

Thomas was appointed Companion of the Order of St Michael and St George in the 2001 New Year Honours; two years later, he was appointed Knight Commander of the Royal Victorian Order.
