= Maurice Rupert Metcalf =

British civil servant and diplomat (1905 – 1972)

Maurice Rupert Metcalf, CMG, OBE (5 May 1905 – 1972) was a British civil servant and diplomat. He was British High Commissioner to the Federation of Rhodesia and Nyasaland from 1955 to 1961.

He was educated at Oundle School and Sidney Sussex College, Cambridge, where he took a BA in agriculture.
