= Anfinsen cage =

Model of protein folding

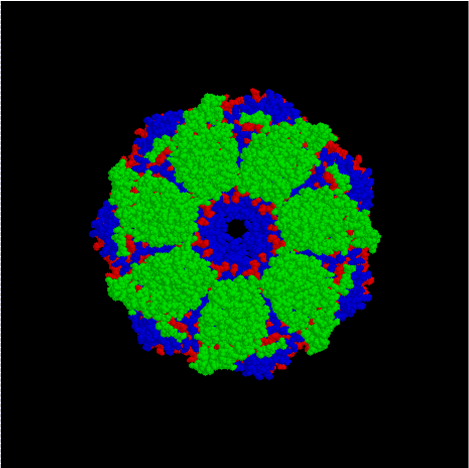
A top-view of the GroES/GroEL bacterial chaperone complex model

In molecular biology, an Anfinsen cage is a model for protein folding used by some cells to improve the production speed and yield of accurate products. Space within a cell is generally limited, and a protein's folding process can be interrupted or modified if it wanders too close to outside forces while it is still in the process of forming. Even worse, the unformed molecules may begin to aggregate uncontrollably, potentially resulting in a disease such as Alzheimer's.

To prevent this, some cells will enclose actively folding proteins within one or more chaperones, forming a "cage" around them to protect them during their transformation. These cages can also serve to isolate incorrectly formed proteins that may otherwise affect other processes if it were allowed to float freely. The model is named after Christian B. Anfinsen who first showed in vitro that pure denatured proteins will sometimes refold spontaneously without an energy source.
