= Brian Donnelly (British diplomat) =

British diplomat

Sir Joseph Brian Donnelly KBE CMG (born 4 April 1945) is a retired British diplomat.

== Early life and education ==
Brought up in Workington, he was educated at Workington Grammar School, The Queen's College Oxford (1963–66) (Wyndham scholar, MA, ed Cherwell), University of Wisconsin-Madison (MA). He began an MPhil at the London School of Economics, but left in 1970 and began working at GCHQ.

== Diplomatic career ==
In 1973 he began working at the UK Foreign and Commonwealth Office. From 1975 to 1979 he served in the UK Mission to the UN as First Secretary for the United Nations Economic and Social Council, and then in Singapore. From 1984 to 1987 he was Deputy to the Chief Scientific Adviser in the Cabinet Office. Subsequently he became Counsellor and Consul General in the Athens Embassy.

In 1991 he attended the Royal College of Defence Studies. He then became Head of the Non-Proliferation Department and represented the United Kingdom at the three preparatory committees for the 1995 Non-Proliferation of Nuclear Weapons treaty Revision and Extension Conference. From 1995 to 1997 he became the United Kingdom Minister and Deputy Permanent Representative to NATO and the Western European Union (WEU) in Brussels.

From 1997 to 1999 he was Ambassador to Yugoslavia, and from 2001 to 2004 Ambassador to Zimbabwe.

== Later career ==
After leaving the diplomatic service, he worked as a special adviser to the Secretary of State for Foreign and Commonwealth Affairs Jack Straw. In retirement he served on the Commonwealth Scholarship Commission from 2006 to 1012 becoming Deputy Chair, and the Special Immigration Appeals Commission.

He was made an honorary fellow of The Queen's College Oxford in 2015.

== Private life ==
Donnelly married before going to the University of Wisconsin-Madison; they had one daughter. He married again in 1997 to author Julia Newsome. They live near Maryport, West Cumbria.

== Honours ==
Donnelly was appointed Companion of the Order of St Michael and St George (CMG) in the 1998 New Year Honours, and knighted as a Knight Commander of the Order of the British Empire (KBE) in the 2003 New Year Honours.

Diplomatic posts
Preceded by Ivor Roberts	HM Ambassador to the Federal Republic of Yugoslavia; 1994-1997	Succeeded by Robert Gordon (head of the interest section)
