= GroES =

Protein

HSPE1

Identifiers
- Aliases: HSPE1, heat shock 10kDa protein 1, CPN10, EPF, GROES, HSP10, heat shock protein family E (Hsp10) member 1
- External IDs: OMIM: 600141; MGI: 104680; GeneCards: HSPE1
Available structures
PDB	Ortholog search: PDBe RCSB
PDB	List of PDB id codes 4PJ1

Gene location (Human)
Chr.	Chromosome 2 (human)
Band	2q33.1	Start	197,500,140 bp
Band	2q33.1	End	197,503,449 bp

Gene location (Mouse)
Chr.	Chromosome 1 (mouse)
Band	1|1 C1.2	Start	55,127,291 bp
Band	1|1 C1.2	End	55,130,466 bp
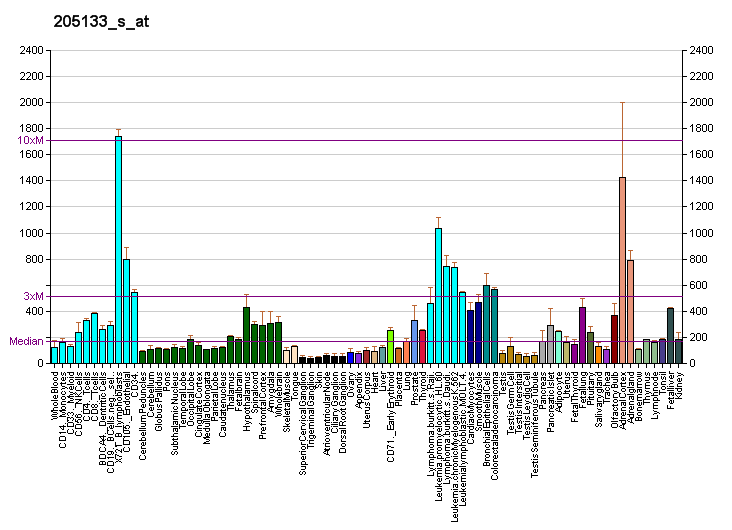
RNA expression pattern
Bgee	Human / Mouse (ortholog); Top expressed in: right adrenal gland; right adrenal cortex; left adrenal gland; left adrenal cortex; mucosa of transverse colon; right lobe of liver; hypothalamus; human kidney; ventricular zone; C1 segment / Top expressed in: embryo; embryo; yolk sac; right kidney; epiblast; blastocyst; ventricular zone; abdominal wall; migratory enteric neural crest cell; neural tube; More reference expression data
BioGPS	More reference expression data
Gene ontology
Molecular function	chaperone binding; protein binding; ATP binding; metal ion binding; unfolded protein binding; RNA binding
Cellular component	cytoplasm; extracellular exosome; membrane; mitochondrion; mitochondrial matrix
Biological process	response to unfolded protein; activation of cysteine-type endopeptidase activity involved in apoptotic process; protein folding; osteoblast differentiation; chaperone cofactor-dependent protein refolding
Sources:Amigo / QuickGO
Orthologs
Databases	NCBI: entry; OMA: entry
Species	Human	Mouse
Entrez	3336	15528
Ensembl	ENSG00000115541	ENSMUSG00000073676
UniProt	P61604	Q64433
RefSeq (mRNA)	NM_002157	NM_008303
RefSeq (protein)	NP_002148	NP_032329
Location (UCSC)	Chr 2: 197.5 – 197.5 Mb	Chr 1: 55.13 – 55.13 Mb
PubMed search
- Wikidata
View/Edit Human	View/Edit Mouse

Cpn10
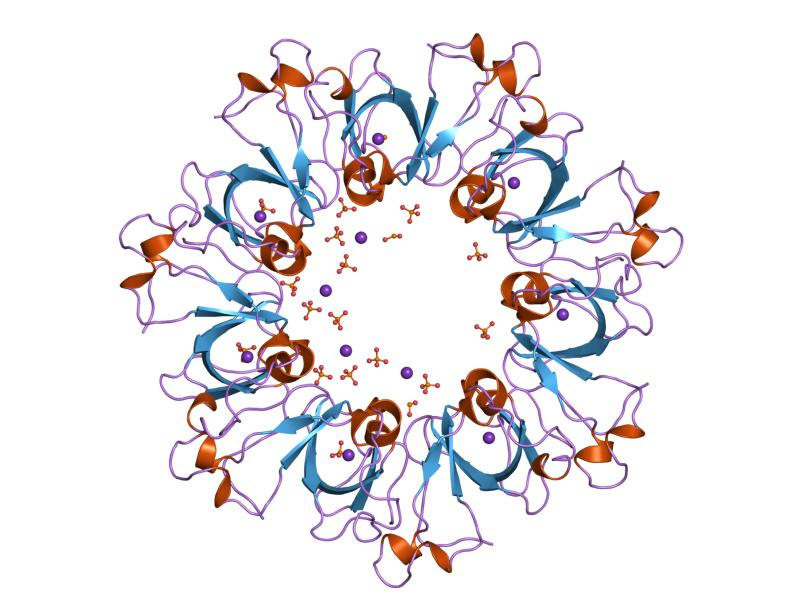
- gp31 co-chaperonin from bacteriophage t4

Identifiers
- Symbol: Cpn10
- Pfam: PF00166
- Pfam clan: CL0296
- InterPro: IPR020818
- PROSITE: PDOC00576
- SCOP2: 1lep / SCOPe / SUPFAM
Available protein structures:
- PDB: IPR020818 PF00166 (ECOD; PDBsum)
- AlphaFold: IPR020818; PF00166

Heat shock 10 kDa protein 1 (Hsp10), also known as chaperonin 10 (cpn10) or early-pregnancy factor (EPF), is a protein that in humans is encoded by the HSPE1 gene. The homolog in E. coli is GroES that is a chaperonin which usually works in conjunction with GroEL.

== Structure and function ==
GroES exists as a ring-shaped oligomer of between six and eight identical subunits, while the 60 kDa chaperonin (cpn60, or groEL in bacteria) forms a structure comprising 2 stacked rings, each ring containing 7 identical subunits. These ring structures assemble by self-stimulation in the presence of Mg^{2+}-ATP. The central cavity of the cylindrical cpn60 tetradecamer provides an isolated environment for protein folding whilst cpn-10 binds to cpn-60 and synchronizes the release of the folded protein in an Mg^{2+}-ATP dependent manner. The binding of cpn10 to cpn60 inhibits the weak ATPase activity of cpn60.

Escherichia coli GroES has also been shown to bind ATP cooperatively, and with an affinity comparable to that of GroEL. Each GroEL subunit contains three structurally distinct domains: an apical, an intermediate and an equatorial domain. The apical domain contains the binding sites for both GroES and the unfolded protein substrate. The equatorial domain contains the ATP-binding site and most of the oligomeric contacts. The intermediate domain links the apical and equatorial domains and transfers allosteric information between them. The GroEL oligomer is a tetradecamer, cylindrically shaped, that is organised in two heptameric rings stacked back to back. Each GroEL ring contains a central cavity, known as the `Anfinsen cage', that provides an isolated environment for protein folding. The identical 10 kDa subunits of GroES form a dome-like heptameric oligomer in solution. ATP binding to GroES may be important in charging the seven subunits of the interacting GroEL ring with ATP, to facilitate cooperative ATP binding and hydrolysis for substrate protein release.

== Interactions ==
GroES has been shown to interact with GroEL.

== Detection ==
Early pregnancy factor is tested for rosette inhibition assay. EPF is present in the maternal serum (blood plasma) shortly after fertilization; EPF is also present in cervical mucus and in amniotic fluid.

EPF may be detected in sheep within 72 hours of mating, in mice within 24 hours of mating, and in samples from media surrounding human embryos fertilized in vitro within 48 hours of fertilization (although another study failed to duplicate this finding for in vitro embryos). EPF has been detected as soon as within six hours of mating.

Because the rosette inhibition assay for EPF is indirect, substances that have similar effects may confound the test. Pig semen, like EPF, has been shown to inhibit rosette formation – the rosette inhibition test was positive for one day in sows mated with a vasectomized boar, but not in sows similarly stimulated without semen exposure. A number of studies in the years after the discovery of EPF were unable to reproduce the consistent detection of EPF in post-conception females, and the validity of the discovery experiments was questioned. However, progress in characterization of EPF has been made and its existence is well-accepted in the scientific community.

== Origin ==
Early embryos are not believed to directly produce EPF. Rather, embryos are believed to produce some other chemical that induces the maternal system to create EPF. After implantation, EPF may be produced by the conceptus directly.

EPF is an immunosuppressant. Along with other substances associated with early embryos, EPF is believed to play a role in preventing the immune system of the pregnant female from attacking the embryo. Injecting anti-EPF antibodies into mice after mating significantly reduced the number of successful pregnancies and number of pups; no effect on growth was seen when mice embryos were cultured in media containing anti-EPF antibodies. While some actions of EPF are the same in all mammals (namely rosette inhibition), other immunosuppressant mechanism vary between species.

In mice, EPF levels are high in early pregnancy, but on day 15 decline to levels found in non-pregnant mice. In humans, EPF levels are high for about the first twenty weeks, then decline, becoming undetectable within eight weeks of delivery.

== Clinical utility ==
=== Pregnancy testing ===
It has been suggested that EPF could be used as a marker for a very early pregnancy test, and as a way to monitor the viability of ongoing pregnancies in livestock. Interest in EPF for this purpose has continued, although current test methods have not proved sufficiently accurate for the requirements of livestock management.

In humans, modern pregnancy tests detect human chorionic gonadotropin (hCG). hCG is not present until after implantation, which occurs six to twelve days after fertilization. In contrast, EPF is present within hours of fertilization. While several other pre-implantation signals have been identified, EPF is believed to be the earliest possible marker of pregnancy. The accuracy of EPF as a pregnancy test in humans has been found to be high by several studies.

=== Birth control research ===
EPF may also be used to determine whether pregnancy prevention mechanism of birth control methods act before or after fertilization. A 1982 study evaluating EPF levels in women with IUDs concluded that post-fertilization mechanisms contribute significantly to the effectiveness of these devices. However, more recent evidence, such as tubal flushing studies indicates that IUDs work by inhibiting fertilization, acting earlier in the reproductive process than previously thought.

For groups that define pregnancy as beginning with fertilization, birth control methods that have postfertilization mechanisms are regarded as abortifacient. There is currently contention over whether hormonal contraception methods have post-fertilization methods, specifically the most popular hormonal method: the combined oral contraceptive pill (COCP). The group Pharmacists for Life has called for a large-scale clinical trial to evaluate EPF in women taking COCPs; this would be the most conclusive evidence available to determine whether COCPs have postfertilization mechanisms.

=== Infertility and early pregnancy loss ===
EPF is useful when investigating embryo loss prior to implantation. One study in healthy human women seeking pregnancy detected fourteen pregnancies with EPF. Of these, six were lost within ten days of ovulation (43% rate of early conceptus loss).

Use of EPF has been proposed to distinguish infertility caused by failure to conceive versus infertility caused by failure to implant. EPF has also been proposed as a marker of viable pregnancy, more useful in distinguishing ectopic or other nonviable pregnancies than other chemical markers such as hCG and progesterone.

=== As a tumour marker ===
Although almost exclusively associated with pregnancy, EPF-like activity has also been detected in tumors of germ cell origin and in other types of tumors. Its utility as a tumour marker, to evaluate the success of surgical treatment, has been suggested.
