= List of high commissioners of the United Kingdom to Tanzania =

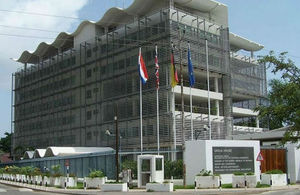
Umoja House, home to the British High Commission in Dar es Salaam

The high commissioner of the United Kingdom to Tanzania is the United Kingdom's foremost diplomatic representative to the United Republic of Tanzania, and head of the UK's diplomatic mission in Tanzania. The high commissioner is based at the High Commission of the United Kingdom, Dar es Salaam.

As the United Kingdom and Tanzania are both members of the Commonwealth of Nations, they exchange high commissioners rather than ambassadors.

Tanzania was formed in 1964 by the union of the Republic of Tanganyika, formerly a British colony, which had gained independence in 1961, and the People's Republic of Zanzibar and Pemba, which had gained independence in December 1963. The People's Republic of Zanzibar had been created the previous year during a revolution in the Sultanate of Zanzibar, which 1890–1963 was a semi-independent Protectorate of the United Kingdom.

The high commissioner to Tanzania is also the UK representative to the East African Community.

== List of heads of mission ==
=== Agents and consuls-general to the Sultanate of Zanzibar ===
- 1902–1904: Sir Charles Eliot (while he was Commissioner for the British East Africa Protectorate (later Kenya))

=== High commissioners ===
==== Tanganyika ====
- 1961–1963: Sir Neil Pritchard

==== United Republic of Tanzania ====
- 1964–1965: Robert Fowler
- 1965–1968: Diplomatic relations severed due to situation with Rhodesia
- 1968–1972: Horace Phillips
- 1972–1974: Arthur Kellas
- 1975–1978: Mervyn Brown
- 1978–1982: Peter Moon
- 1982–1985: John Sankey
- 1986–1989: Colin Imray
- 1989–1992: Thorold Masefield
- 1992–1995: Roger Westbrook
- 1995–1998: Alan Montgomery
- 1998–2001: Bruce Dinwiddy
- 2001–2003: Richard Clarke
- 2003–2006: Andrew Pocock
- 2006–2009: Philip Parham
- 2009–2013: Diane Corner
- 2013–2016: Dianna Melrose
- 2016-2020: Sarah Cooke,
- 2020–2024: David Concar
- 2024-Present: Marianne Young
