= List of high commissioners of the United Kingdom to Singapore =

The high commissioner of the United Kingdom to the Republic of Singapore is the United Kingdom's foremost diplomatic representative in Singapore.

Singapore, previously a British colony, became an internally self-governing state in 1959 and George Douglas-Hamilton, 10th Earl of Selkirk, was appointed commissioner (not high commissioner) for Singapore and South East Asia. In 1963, Singapore declared independence from Britain and joined the new Federation of Malaysia. In 1965, Singapore left Malaysia and became an independent country (as the Republic of Singapore) and a full member of the Commonwealth. As a member of the Commonwealth, the United Kingdom's diplomatic representative is a high commissioner rather than an ambassador.

The British high commission is located at Tanglin Road, close to the Australian high commission and American embassy.

== Commissioners ==
- 1959: Sir William Goode. Colonial Secretary (1953–57), Last Governor of Singapore (1957–59) . He was appointed Commissioner as part of transitional arrangements.
- 1959–1963: Earl of Selkirk

1963–1965: Singapore united with Malaysia

== High commissioners ==
- 1965–1967: John Vernon Rob
- 1968–1970: Sir Arthur de la Mare
- 1970–1974: Sir Sam Falle
- 1974–1978: Peter Tripp
- 1978–1982: John Dunn Hennings
- 1982–1985: Sir Peter Moon
- 1985–1987: Sir Hamilton Whyte
- 1987–1990: Sir Michael Pike
- 1990–1997: Gordon Duggan
- 1997–2001: Alan Hunt
- 2001–2002: Sir Stephen Brown
- 2003–2007: Sir Alan Collins
- 2007–2011: Paul Madden
- 2011–2015: Antony Phillipson
- 2015–2019: Scott Wightman
- 2019–2024: Kara Owen
- From July 2024: Nikesh Mehta
