= Tanzania–United Kingdom relations =

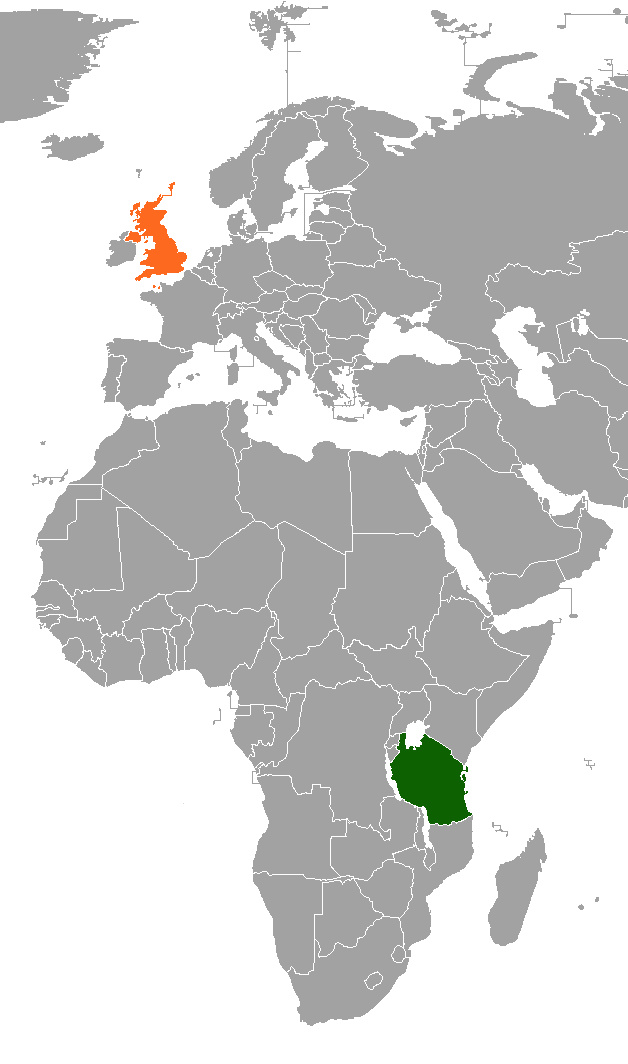

- Tanzania: United Kingdom

Diplomatic mission
- British High Commission, Dar es Salaam: High Commission of Tanzania, London

Envoy
- High Commissioner Marianne Young: High Commissioner Mbelwa Kairuki

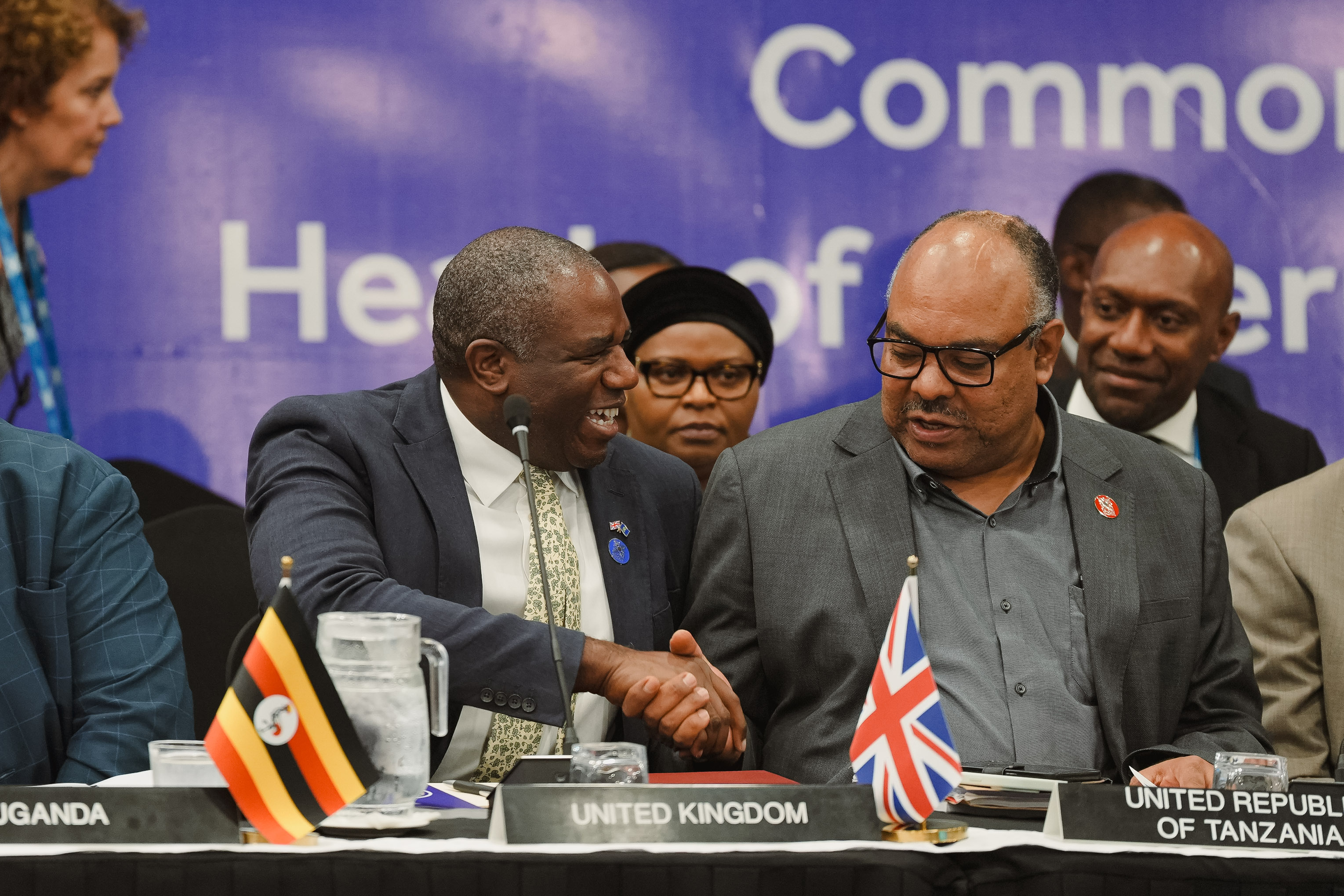
British Foreign Secretary David Lammy with Tanzanian Foreign Minister Mahmoud Thabit Kombo at a Commonwealth summit in Apia, October 2024.

Tanzania and the United Kingdom maintain diplomatic, historical, political, and bilateral relations. The UK governed Tanganyika from 1916 to 1961, when Tanganyika achieved full independence; the UK governed Zanzibar from 1890 to 1963, when Zanzibar achieved full independence. Both countries unified on 26 April 1964 to become Tanzania. Both countries established diplomatic relations on 9 December 1961

Both countries share common membership of the Commonwealth, and the World Trade Organization. Bilaterally the two countries have a Development Partnership, and a High Level Prosperity Partnership.

== Early history ==
Relations between the United Kingdom and what is now Tanzania developed in the early 19th century, as British influence grew in Tanganyika and Zanzibar, the former territories that now make up the modern state of Tanzania.

In Zanzibar, the United Kingdom’s engagement was defined both by commerce and a desire to end the Indian Ocean slave trade. In 1822, the British signed the first of a series of treaties with Said bin Sultan, the Omani sultan of Zanzibar, to curb the trade, with it eventually being prohibited in 1876. In 1890, the British Empire agreed the Heligoland–Zanzibar Treaty with Germany, which formally gave them control of Zanzibar. The British protectorate ended in December 1963.

In Tanganyika, British explorers Richard Francis Burton and John Speke became the first Europeans to visit Lake Tanganyika in 1858. In 1919, the British gained control of most of Tanganyikan territory, following a League of Nations mandate that ended the period of German colonial administration that had started in 1884. On 9 December 1961, Tanganyika (1961–1964) gained Independence, and Julius Nyerere, University of Edinburgh alumni and leader of the Tanganyika African National Union, was appointed President.

Tanganyika was admitted as a member of the Commonwealth of Nations in 1961. The bilateral relationship between the UK and modern day Tanzania formally began in 1964, when Tanganyika merged with Zanzibar in 1964, to form the United Republic of Tanzania.

Tanzania broke off relations with the United Kingdom between December 1965 and July 1968, in response to British policy towards Rhodesia's Unilateral Declaration of Independence.

== Trade ==
Tanzanian exports to the United Kingdom are dominated by raw materials such as tea, tobacco and precious stones. The United Kingdom is the largest non-African purchaser of Tanzanian tea. On the other hand, UK exports to Tanzania are mainly dominated by automobiles and electronic appliances.

=== Trade Statistics ===
Trade Value in UK £ Million
	2013	2014	2015	2016	2017	2018	2019	2020	2021	2022
Total Trade	460	465	442	333	339	336	198	233	184	323
Exports from UK to Tanzania	272	287	290	214	195	171	161	139	164	275
Imports to UK from Tanzania	188	178	152	119	144	165	37	94	20	48
Department for Business and Trade as of 1 August 2023

=== Foreign Direct Investment ===
Being the former colonial power, the United Kingdom is one of Tanzania's oldest trading partners. In 2021 the United Kingdom ranked fourth for foreign direct investment into Tanzania behind the Cayman Islands, China and Canada. Foreign investment in the country is spread out across multiple sectors, such as mining, manufacturing and agriculture. The only British firm listed on the Dar es Salaam Stock Exchange was Acacia Mining before its delisting on 18 November 2019.

== Tourism ==
The United Kingdom is one of the top contributors of tourism to Tanzania, with 60,116 arrivals being recorded in 2022.

British Airways previously operated direct flights between London and Dar es Salaam, but flights were suspended on 31 March 2013 after 82 years of operations due to a lack of profitability.

== Education ==
UK Official Development Assistance has funded the Shule Bola Initiative, an £89 million programme which aims to improve learning outcomes for over 4 million children in Tanzania. Launched in 2022, the programme places particular emphasis on girls, the disabled and those living in deprived areas.

The Foreign, Commonwealth and Development Office provides funding for the Chevening Scholarship programme in Tanzania.

== Resident diplomatic missions ==
- Tanzania maintains a high commission in London.
- The United Kingdom is accredited to Tanzania through its high commission in Dar es Salaam.
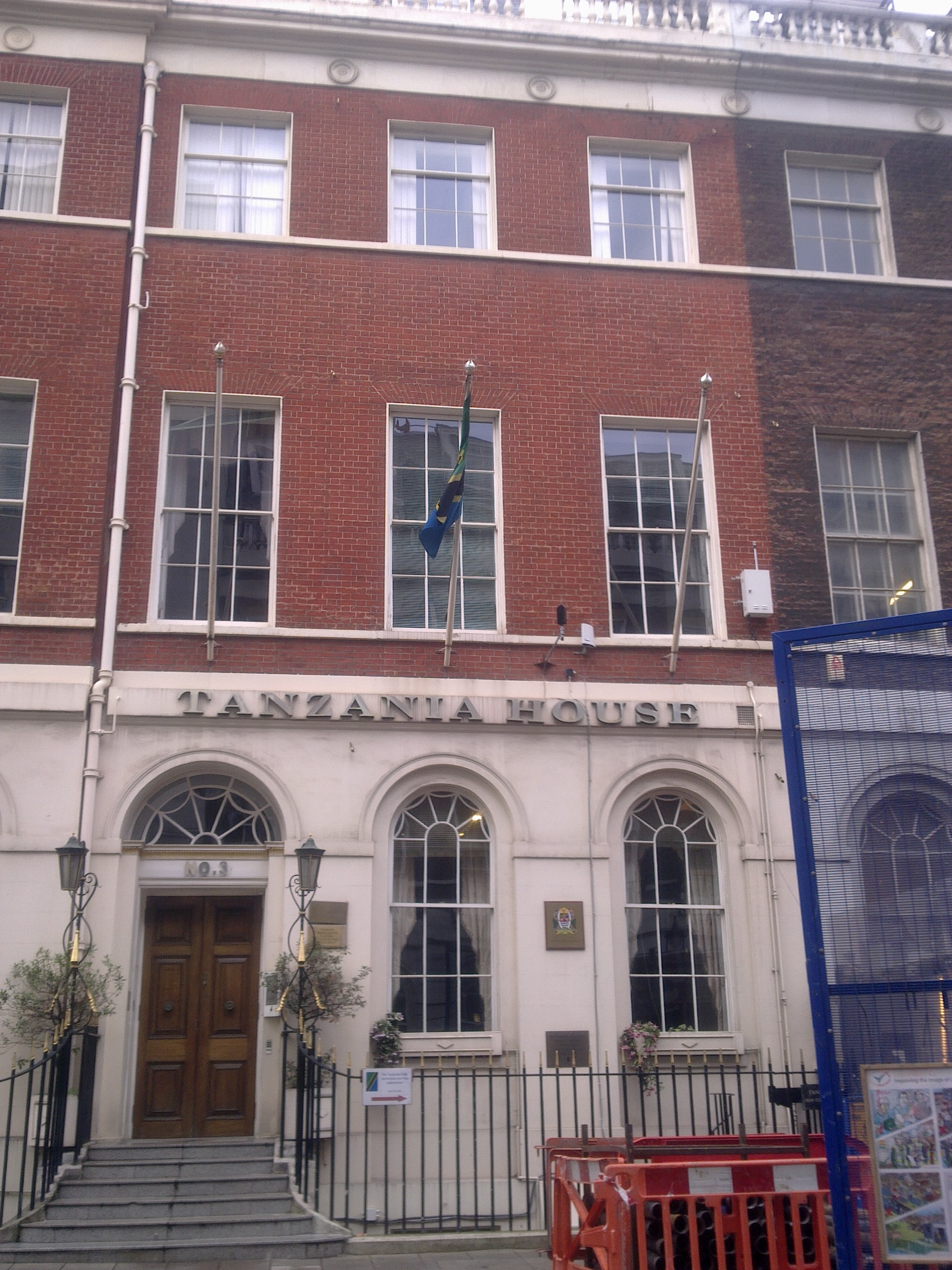
High Commission of Tanzania in London

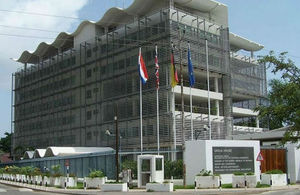
High Commission of the United Kingdom in Dar es Salaam
