= Richard Dales =

British diplomat (b. 1942)

Sir Richard Nigel Dales, KCVO, CMG (born 1942) is a retired British diplomat.

After attending Chigwell School and St Catharine's College, Cambridge, Dales entered the Foreign and Commonwealth Office (FCO) in 1964 and was appointed to HM Diplomatic Service in 1972. He was First Secretary at the United Kingdom's Embassy in Bulgaria from 1977 to 1981, then Counsellor at the Embassy in Denmark from 1982 to 1986, when he became Deputy High Commissioner in Zimbabwe. He returned to the FCO in 1989 as Head of the Southern Africa Department, serving until 1991. From 1992 to 1995, he was High Commissioner to Zimbabwe; then, after three years as an Assistant Under-Secretary at the FCO, he served as the United Kingdom's Ambassador to Norway from 1998 to 2002.

Dales was appointed a Companion of the Order of St Michael and St George in the 1993 New Year Honours, and a Knight Commander of the Royal Victorian Order in May 2001, during Elizabeth II's state visit to Norway.
