= Horace Phillips (diplomat) =

British diplomat

Sir Horace Hyman Phillips, KCMG (31 May 1917 – 19 March 2004) was a British diplomat. He was the first British Jewish career ambassador.

== Biography ==
Phillips was born in Glasgow, the eldest of seven children, and the grandson of Jewish emigrants from Eastern Europe. After attending Hillhead High School he entered the Inland Revenue as a clerical officer. During the Second World War, he served in the British and Indian armies for seven years (Dorsetshire Regiment and 1st Punjab Regiment). He served in Iraq, India, Burma, Ceylon and Malaya, and reached the rank of major in the Indian Army. While he was in India, probably in mid-1943, he was sent to the School of Japanese Instruction at Simla and completed a six-month language course for intelligence work.

Having been rebuffed by the Consular Service before the war due to his social standing, Phillips joined the Diplomatic Service in 1947, and served successively in Persia, Afghanistan, Saudi Arabia, Aden, and Iran. He was British ambassador to Indonesia from 1966 to 1968. That year, he was selected as the British ambassador to Saudi Arabia. Having given their agrément, the Saudi government withdrew it when it was learned that Phillips was Jewish, even though Phillips had previously served in Saudi Arabia without any incident. Though it was reported in the media at the time that he was an "ex-Jew" or "non-practising Jew", he was in fact a member of a synagogue, and a religious Jew throughout his life.

After the abortive Saudi appointment, he was appointed British high commissioner to Tanzania in 1968 and British ambassador to Turkey in 1973, and was in post when Turkey invaded Cyprus in 1974. He retired in 1977, and enjoyed a second career of ten years as resident representative for Taylor Woodrow. He also lectured at Bilkent University in Ankara until 1997, latterly on the history of diplomacy.

Phillips was appointed CMG in 1963, and KCMG in the 1973 Birthday Honours.

He was married to Idina, Lady Phillips (née Idina Doreen Morgan) for over 60 years. They had two children and four grown-up grandchildren, one of whom is the BBC correspondent Luisa Baldini.

He authored the book "Ihsan Dogramaci: A Remarkable Turk" in 1997.

In 2023, the Phillips Room was dedicated to him at the Foreign, Commonwealth and Development Office in King Charles Street, London.
