= Neil Pritchard =

British diplomat

Sir Neil Pritchard, KCMG (14 January 1911 – 10 October 2010) was a British diplomat. He was British High Commissioner to Tanganyika from 1961 to 1963 and British Ambassador to Thailand from 1967 to 1970.
