= List of high commissioners of the United Kingdom to Nigeria =

Countries belonging to the Commonwealth of Nations typically exchange high commissioners, rather than ambassadors. Though there are a few technical differences, they are in practice one and the same office. The following persons have served as British high commissioner to the Federal Republic of Nigeria since the country gained its independence from the United Kingdom on 1 October 1960:

- 1960–1963: Antony Head, 1st Viscount Head
- 1964–1967: Sir Francis Cumming-Bruce
- 1967–1969: Sir David Hunt
- 1969–1971: Sir Leslie Glass
- 1971–1974: Sir Cyril Pickard
- 1974–1976: Sir Martin Le Quesne
- 1977–1978: Sir Sam Falle
- 1979–1983: Sir Mervyn Brown
- 1983–1984: Sir Hamilton Whyte
- 1984–1986: High commissioner recalled following the Dikko Affair
- 1986–1988: Sir Martin Ewans
- 1988–1991: Brian Barder
- 1991–1994: Christopher MacRae
- 1994–1997: Thorold Masefield
- 1997–2001: Sir Graham Burton
- 2001–2004: Sir Philip Thomas
- 2004–2007: Sir Richard Gozney
- 2007–2011: Robert Dewar
- 2011–2012: Andrew Lloyd
- 2012–2015: Sir Andrew Pocock
- 2015–2018: Paul Arkwright
- 2018–2023: Catriona Laing
- 2023–2026: Richard Montgomery
- 2026–: Peter Vowles
