= High Commission of the United Kingdom, Dar es Salaam =

British High Commission

British High Commission, Dar es Salaam
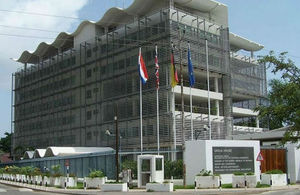
- Location: Dar es Salaam, Tanzania
- Address: Umoja House; Hamburg Avenue; Dar es Salaam, Tanzania
- High Commissioner: Marianne Young
- Website: Official website

The British high commission in Dar es Salaam (Swahili: Ubalozi wa Uingereza) is the diplomatic mission of the United Kingdom in Tanzania. It is located on Hamburg Avenue in the Ilala District. The current British high commissioner to Tanzania is Marianne Young since August 2024.

== History ==
As fellow members of the Commonwealth of Nations, the United Kingdom and Tanzania conduct their diplomatic relations at governmental level, rather than between heads of state. Therefore, the countries exchange high commissioners, rather than ambassadors. The UK has had a high commissioner to Tanzania since it was formed in 1964 from the union of the Republic of Tanganyika and the People's Republic of Zanzibar and Pemba.

The high commissioner to Tanzania is also UK Representative to the East African Community and also represents the British Overseas Territories in Tanzania.

Umoja House, the seven-story office building that hosts the High Commission is also home to the embassies of The Netherlands and Germany. It was designed by British architect Michael Manser and completed in 2002.

== See also ==
- Diplomatic missions of the United Kingdom
- List of high commissioners of the United Kingdom to Tanzania
