= Peter Moon (diplomat) =

British diplomat (1928–1991)

Sir Peter James Scott Moon KCVO CMG (1 April 1928 – 10 July 1991) was a British diplomat.

== Career ==
Peter James Scott Moon was educated at Uppingham School and Worcester College, Oxford. He entered the Home Office in 1952 but transferred to the then Commonwealth Relations Office in 1954, serving in South Africa and Ceylon and as private secretary to the Secretary of State for Commonwealth Relations. He then joined the Diplomatic Service and served at the UK mission to the United Nations in New York 1965–69, at the Foreign and Commonwealth Office 1969–70, as private secretary (foreign affairs) to the prime minister 1970–72, and on the international staff of NATO in Brussels 1972–75. After a posting to Cairo 1975–78, he was High Commissioner in Tanzania 1978–82 (and non-resident Ambassador to Madagascar 1978–79), High Commissioner in Singapore 1982–85, and Ambassador to Kuwait 1985–87.

Moon was appointed CMG in the New Year Honours of 1979 and knighted KCVO in the same year.

Diplomatic posts
Preceded by Edward Youde	Private Secretary for Foreign Affairs to the Prime Minister; 1970–1972	Succeeded by Thomas Bridges, 2nd Baron Bridges
Preceded by Mervyn Brown	High Commissioner in Tanzania; 1978–1982	Succeeded by John Sankey
Preceded by Mervyn Brown	Ambassador Extraordinary and Plenipotentiary for the Democratic Republic of Madagascar; 1978–1979	Succeeded by Richard Langridge
Preceded by Sir Sam Falle	High Commissioner in Singapore; 1982–1985	Succeeded by John Hennings
Preceded by Sir Ramsay Melhuish	Ambassador to the State of Kuwait; 1985–1987	Succeeded by Peter Hinchcliffe
