= Stephen Brown (diplomat) =

British diplomat

Sir Stephen David Reid Brown, KCVO (born 26 December 1945) is a retired British diplomat.

Educated at Leeds Grammar School, he is a graduate of the Royal Military College, Sandhurst and the University of Sussex. Brown served in the Royal Artillery from 1966 to 1976 when he entered the Foreign and Commonwealth Office (FCO). He was appointed to HM Diplomatic Service in 1980 and served as the British consul-general in Melbourne from 1989 to 1994, after which he spent three years as commercial counsellor in the British Embassy in China. He was then the United Kingdom's ambassador to South Korea from 1997 to 2000 and the High Commissioner to Singapore from 2001 to 2002. He then spent three years as Chief Executive of UK Trade & Investment. Since leaving public service in 2005, he has been an adviser to Vermilion Partners.

Brown was appointed a Knight Commander of the Royal Victorian Order in April 1999, during Elizabeth II's visit to South Korea.
