= Peter Smalle =

English priest and poet (fl. 1596–1615)

The Reverend Peter Smalle
- Rector of Pinnock
- Appointed: 1604

Personal details
- Born: 1577–1578
- Denomination: Anglican

Peter Smalle (fl. 1596–1615) was a priest of the Church of England and a minor poet. He graduated B.C.L. at St. John's College, Cambridge, in 1602, and became rector of Pinnock, Gloucestershire, in 1604. He was the author of Mans Hay or a Moneths minde (1615).

== Life ==
Peter Smalle, born in 1578 or the end of 1577, was a native of Berkshire. He matriculated from St. John's College, Oxford, on 5 November 1596, and graduated B.C.L. on 17 December 1602. In 1604 he became rector of Pinnock in Gloucestershire.

== Works ==
In 1615 Smalle published what E. I. Carlyle calls "a poem of considerable merit", entitled, Mans May or a Moneths minde: wherein the libertie of mans minde is compared to the Moneth of May, by Peter Smalle, Batchelour in the Lawes, London: printed by George Purslowe for Samuel Rand, 1615, 4to. It is prefaced by verses 'to all Gentlemen Students and Schollers', 'to the Reader the Authors Resolution', 'to the Right Worshipfull my most loving good friend Sir Henry Blomar of Hatherup in the county of Gloucester, knt.', and finally by a single stanza 'Ad eundem'. According to Carlyle, "The poet not only shows a keen appreciation of natural beauty, but describes contemporary fashions with quaint vividness." The poem is written in rhyming couplets of iambic pentameter. Copies of the book are in the British Library and Bodleian Library.

== Sources ==
- Carlyle, E. I.; Goldring, Elizabeth (2004). "Smalle, Peter (b. 1577/8), poet". Oxford Dictionary of National Biography (online ed.). Oxford University Press. doi:10.1093/ref:odnb/25735. (Subscription, Wikipedia Library access or UK public library membership required.)

Attribution:

- This article incorporates text from a publication now in the public domain: Carlyle, Edward Irving (1897). "Smalle, Peter". In Lee, Sidney (ed.). Dictionary of National Biography. Vol. 52. London: Smith, Elder & Co. pp. 382–383.
