= Mervyn Brown =

British diplomat (1923–2023)

Brown in 1967.

Sir Mervyn Brown KCMG OBE (24 September 1923 – 28 September 2023) was a British ambassador and historian of Madagascar.

== Life and career ==
Mervyn Brown was born on 24 September 1923. He was educated at Murton, where his parents lived, then Ryhope Grammar School and St John's College, Oxford. He served with the Royal Artillery 1942–45 and joined the Diplomatic Service in 1949. After serving at Buenos Aires and at the UK mission to the United Nations in New York, in 1960 he was appointed consul in Vientiane, Laos, and deputy to the ambassador (John Addis). He later wrote a memoir of his experience of the Laotian Civil War, including a month spent as a prisoner of the Pathet Lao.

Brown was Ambassador to Madagascar 1967–70, High Commissioner to Tanzania and concurrently Ambassador to Madagascar (this time non-resident) 1975–78, and High Commissioner to Nigeria and concurrently Ambassador to Benin 1979–83.

Brown was appointed OBE in the 1963 New Year Honours, and CMG in the 1975 New Year Honours. He was knighted KCMG in the 1981 New Year Honours. He was an Officier of the Ordre National of Madagascar. He was a patron of the charity Money for Madagascar.

Sir Mervyn Brown died on 28 September 2023, four days after celebrating his 100th birthday.

== Publications ==
- Madagascar Rediscovered: A History from Early Times to Independence, 1978. ISBN 0950628409
- A History of Madagascar, 1995. ISBN 1558762922
- War in Shangri-La: A Memoir of Civil War in Laos, 2001. ISBN 1860647359

Diplomatic posts
Preceded by Alan Horn	Ambassador Extraordinary and Plenipotentiary at Tananarive; 1967–1970	Succeeded by Timothy Crosthwait
Preceded by Arthur Kellas	High Commissioner to Tanzania; 1975–1978	Succeeded by Peter Moon
Preceded by Timothy Crosthwait	Ambassador Extraordinary and Plenipotentiary to the Democratic Republic of Madagascar; 1975–1978	Succeeded by Peter Moon
Preceded by Sir Sam Falle	High Commissioner to Nigeria; 1979–1983	Succeeded by Sir Hamilton Whyte
Preceded by Sir Sam Falle	Ambassador Extraordinary and Plenipotentiary at Cotonou; 1979–1983	Succeeded by Sir Hamilton Whyte
