= List of ambassadors of the United Kingdom to Madagascar =

The ambassador of the United Kingdom to the Republic of Madagascar is the United Kingdom's foremost diplomatic representative in Madagascar, and head of the UK's diplomatic mission in Antananarivo.

Madagascar gained independence from France in 1960 and Andrew Ronalds, who had previously been consul-general, was appointed the first ambassador until he retired in the following year. For two periods there has been no resident ambassador: from 1975 to 1979 the high commissioner to Tanzania was also non-resident ambassador to Madagascar, and from 2005 to 2012 the high commissioner to Mauritius was non-resident ambassador.

Madagascar has applied to join the Commonwealth of Nations. If and when it is admitted, the ambassador will become a high commissioner and the embassy will become a high commission.

== Ambassadors ==
- 1960–1961: Andrew Ronalds
- 1961–1962: John Street
- 1963–1967: Alan Horn
- 1967–1970: Mervyn Brown
- 1970–1975: Timothy Crosthwait
- 1975–1978: Mervyn Brown (non-resident)
- 1978–1979: Peter Moon (non-resident)
- 1980–1984: Richard Langridge
- 1984–1987: Malcolm McBain
- 1987–1990: Anthony Hayday
- 1990–1992: Dennis Amy
- 1993–1996: Peter Smith
- 1996–1999: Robert Dewar
- 1999–2002: Charles Mochan
- 2002–2005: Brian Donaldson
- 2005–2005: Anthony Godson (non-resident)
- 2007–2010: John Murton (non-resident)
- 2010–2012: Nicholas Leake (non-resident)
- 2012–2017: Timothy Smart
- 2017-2020: Phil Boyle
- 2020–2025:David Ashley
- 2025–present: Patrick Lynch
