= Paula Booth =

British chemist

- Born: Paula Jane Booth
- Known for: Study of Lipids and Membranes
- Awards: Philip Leverhulme Prize
- Scientific career
- Fields: Chemistry and Biochemistry
- Institutions: King's College, London

Paula Jane Booth is an English chemist who holds the Daniell Chair of Chemistry at King's College London and is Head of Department. Booth was awarded a Philip Leverhulme Prize in 2003, a Royal Society Wolfson Research Merit Award in 2008 and an ERC Advanced grant in 2012 for her novel work on investigating the mechanisms of biological self-assembly.

== Education and academic career ==
Booth studied for a BA Hons in Chemistry at St John’s College, Oxford. Booth undertook a PhD to study the thermodynamic properties of electron transfer in Photosystem 2 reaction centres, at Imperial College, London, under the supervisor of George Porter and James Barber. Following a short fellowship at the Centre D-Etudes de Saclay outside Paris, Booth set up her own research group at the University of Oxford, whilst holding a Research Fellowship at Corpus Christi College. After this, Booth moved to Imperial College and then the University of Bristol where she was appointed professor in 2005. In 2014 Booth was appointed Daniell Chair and Head of Department at King's College London. She is also on the academic staff at The London Centre for Nanotechnology.

== Research interests ==
At the University of Bristol, Booth investigated the minimal lipid composition which allows insertion of membrane proteins. Booth's current research studies how membrane lipids impact on membrane protein folding and activity. Booth also investigates the design of artificial membrane proteins and lipids to develop synthetic biology systems to apply to useful applications. Techniques from many disciplines are put to use by Booth to measure and alter properties of membrane lipids and proteins.

== Professional associations and awards ==
- In 2003, Booth was awarded a Philip Leverhulme Prize.
- In 2008, Booth received a Royal Society Wolfson Research Merit Award.
- In 2012, Booth was nominated for membership of AcademiaNet by the European Research Council (ERC).
- In 2012, Booth was awarded an ERC Advanced grant to investigate the fundamentals of membrane transporter folding and creation of synthetic modules.
