= Martin Ewans =

British diplomat and writer (1928 – 2012)

Sir Martin Kenneth Ewans (14 November 1928 – 5 April 2012) was a British diplomat and writer. He served as British High Commissioner to Zimbabwe and British High Commissioner to Nigeria.
