= Diane Corner =

British ambassador

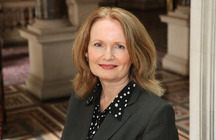
Diane Corner

Diane Louise Corner CMG OBE (born 29 September 1959) is a British diplomat who served as the British Consul General in Jerusalem from 2021 until 2024. She was previously the Deputy Special Representative of the Secretary General of MINUSCA between 2014 and 2017.

== Education and career ==
Corner attended Winchester County High School for Girls, before continuing her education at Peter Symonds College in Winchester. She went on to study BA French and Politics at the University of Bristol, and later achieved a MA in War Studies from King's College London.

Upon joining the Foreign and Commonwealth Office (FCO) in 1982, Corner served at Kuala Lumpur, New York, Berlin, Harare and in the Cabinet Office on secondment, as well as in the FCO. In 2000, she completed the Senior Course at the NATO Defence College in Rome.

Corner was acting High Commissioner to Sierra Leone between 2008 and 2009, High Commissioner to Tanzania from 2009 to 2013 and Ambassador to the Democratic Republic of Congo from 2013 to 2014. She was appointed by United Nations Secretary-General Ban Ki-moon as his Deputy Special Representative in July 2014, before leaving the role in June 2017.

Corner was appointed Officer of the Order of the British Empire (OBE) in the 2018 Birthday Honours list.

In July 2021, Corner was appointed as the British Consul General in Jerusalem. In the 2025 New Years Honours list she was appointed Companion of the Order of St Michael and St George.
