= Charles Mochan =

Scottish footballer

Personal information
- Full name: Charles Mochan
- Date of birth: 8 June 1879
- Place of birth: Glasgow, Scotland
- Position: Full back

Senior career*
Years	Team	Apps	(Gls)
1903–1904	Strathclyde		
1904–1905	Grimsby Town	12	(0)
1905–1906	Brighton & Hove Albion	2	(0)
1906–190?	Renton		
- * Club domestic league appearances and goals

Charles Mochan (8 June 1879 – after 1906) was a Scottish professional footballer who played as a full back. He played in England for Grimsby Town in the Football League and for Brighton & Hove Albion in the Southern League.
