= Michael Pike =

British diplomat (1931–2022)

Sir Michael Edmund Pike KCVO CMG (4 October 1931 – 1 August 2022) was a British diplomat.

== Life and career ==
Pike was born on 4 October 1931. After attending the London School of Economics and Brasenose College, Oxford, Pike worked for The Sunday Express and then The Surrey Comet before joining HM Foreign Service in 1956 as a Third Secretary.

Promotion followed to Second Secretary in 1960 and in 1968 he was appointed First Secretary at the British Embassy in Warsaw; after three years back at the Foreign and Commonwealth Office, he was posted as First Secretary to the British Embassy in Washington, DC, in 1973 and then served there as Counsellor from 1975 to 1978. He then spent four years in Israel before serving as the British Ambassador to Vietnam from 1982 to 1985. He was then the United Kingdom's Deputy Permanent Representative to NATO from 1985 to 1987 before serving as the British High Commissioner to Singapore from 1987 to 1990. He left the service that year and subsequently held advisory roles and directorships in the private sector. He was Chairman of the Editorial Board of the Asian Affairs Journal until 2014.

Pike was appointed a Companion of the Order of St Michael and St George in the 1984 New Year Honours, and was also appointed a Knight Commander of the Royal Victorian Order in November 1989.

Pike died on 1 August 2022, at the age of 90.
