= List of knights and dames commander of the Royal Victorian Order appointed by Elizabeth II (1978–2002) =

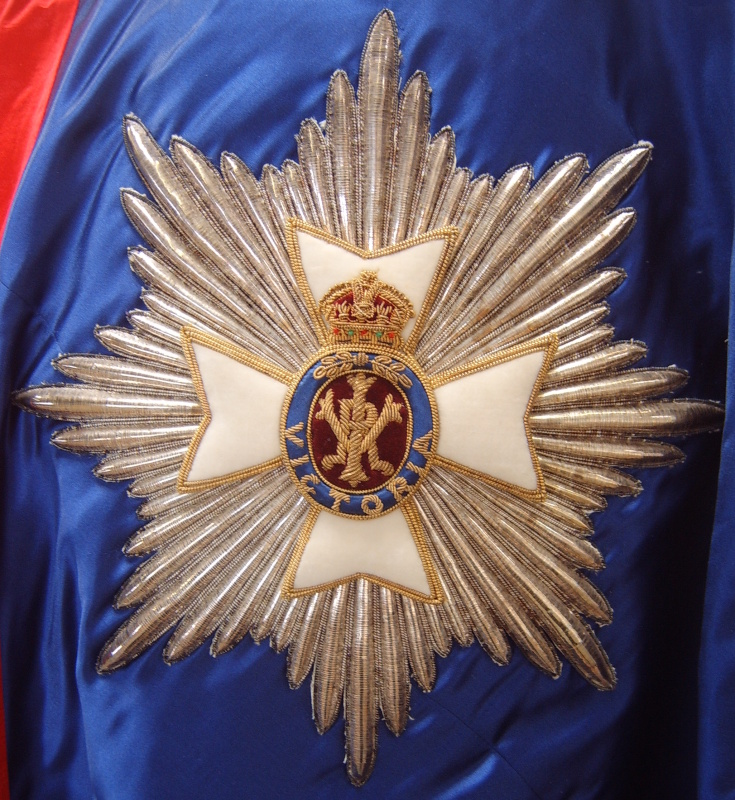
The star of a Knight or Dame Grand Cross of the Royal Victorian Order

The Royal Victorian Order is an order of knighthood awarded by the sovereign of the United Kingdom and several Commonwealth realms. It is granted personally by the monarch and recognises personal service to the monarchy, the Royal Household, royal family members, and the organisation of important royal events. The order was officially created and instituted on 23 April 1896 by letters patent under the Great Seal of the Realm by Queen Victoria. It was instituted with five grades, the two highest of which were Knight Grand Cross (GCVO) and Knight Commander (KCVO), which conferred the status of knighthood on holders (apart from foreigners, who typically received honorary awards not entitling them to the style of a knight). Women were not admitted until Edward VIII altered the statutes of the order in 1936; those receiving the highest two awards were styled dames and those grades, when conferred on women, are Dame Grand Cross (GCVO) and Dame Commander (DCVO).

No limit was placed on the number of appointments which could be made. Queen Elizabeth II appointed 104 knights and dames commander between the end of her Silver Jubilee year (1977) and the end of her Golden Jubilee year (2002).

== Knights and dames commander appointed by Elizabeth II between 1978 and 2002 ==
The list below is ordered by date of appointment. Full names, ranks and titles are given where applicable, as correct at the time of appointment to the order. Branch of service or regiment details are given in parentheses to distinguish them from offices. The offices listed are those given in the official notice, printed in the London Gazette or in published material elsewhere. Where applicable, the occasion is given that was listed either with the notices or in published material elsewhere, in which case that material is cited.

Name	Date	Notes	Ref.
Jean Elizabeth Taylor, CVO	1 June 1978	Chief Clerk, Private Secretary's Office	
Sir Hugh Maxwell Casson	3 June 1978	President, Royal Academy of Arts	
William Alan Wood, CB	3 June 1978	Second Crown Estate Commissioner	
Alfred Lapthorn Blake, CVO, MC	30 December 1978	Director, The Duke of Edinburgh's Award Scheme	
The Rev. Canon James Seymour Denis Mansel, MVO	30 December 1978	Sub-Dean of the Chapels Royal	
Sir Peter Malden Studd, GBE	30 December 1978	Chairman of the Queen's Silver Jubilee Appeal	
Sir Arthur John Wilton, KCMG, MC	19 February 1979	HM Ambassador in Jedda, appointed on the occasion of the Queen's visit to Saudi Arabia	
Brian Gerald Tivy Stanbridge, CBE, MVO, AFC	9 April 1979	Defence Services Secretary	
David John Checketts, CVO	20 April 1979	Private Secretary, Treasurer and Equerry to the Prince of Wales	
James Albert Watts, CVO	20 April 1979	Superintendent, Royalty Protection Command	
Anne Marion Warburton, CMG, CVO	18 May 1979	HM Ambassador in Copenhagen, appointed on the occasion of the Queen's state visit to Denmark	
Sir Robert Mayer, CH	5 June 1979	For services to music	
The Dowager Baroness Fermoy, CVO, OBE	16 June 1979	Woman of the Bedchamber to Queen Elizabeth the Queen Mother	
Stephen James Hamilton Miller	16 June 1979	Surgeon-Oculist to the Queen	
James Wilfrid Stubbs, TD	16 June 1979	Grand Secretary of the Freemasons, United Grand Lodge of England	
The Very Rev. Martin Gloster Sullivan	16 June 1979	Dean Emeritus of St Paul's Cathedral	
William Digby Manifold Raeburn, CB, DSO, MBE	10 July 1979	Resident Governor, Tower of London, and Keeper of the Jewel House	
Peter James Scott Moon, CMG	22 July 1979	British High Commissioner in Tanzania, appointed on the occasion of the Queen's visit to Tanzania	
Michael Scott, CMG, MVO	24 July 1979	British High Commissioner in Malawi, appointed on the occasion of the Queen's visit to Malawi	
Walter Leonard Allinson, CMG, MVO	3 August 1979	British High Commissioner in Zambia, appointed on the occasion of the Queen's visit to Zambia	
John Swinton, OBE	19 October 1979	General Officer Commanding, London District	
Peter Bernard Gillett, CB, CVO, OBE	14 December 1979	Secretary, Central Chancery of the Orders of Knighthood, and Registrar, Royal Victorian Order	
Mark Baring, CVO	31 December 1979	For services to King Edward VII Hospital for Officers	
Sir James Carreras, MBE	31 December 1979	Trustee, The Duke of Edinburgh's Award	
Sir Alexander Abel-Smith, TD	31 December 1979	Deputy Chairman of the Trustees, The Duke of Edinburgh's Award Scheme	
Archie Little Winskill, CVO, CBE, DFC, AE	31 December 1979	Captain of the Queen's Flight	
Alan Keir Rothnie, CMG	2 May 1980	HM Ambassadorin Switzerland, appointed on the occasion of the Queen's visit to Switzerland	
Sir Peter William Beckwith Ashmore, KCB, MVO, DSC	14 June 1980	Master of the Household	
Arthur James Robert Collins, CVO	14 June 1980	Solicitor to the Ascot Authority	
Neville Egerton Leigh, CVO	14 June 1980	Clerk of the Privy Council	
Henry Peat, CVO, DFC	5 August 1980	Privy Purse Auditor	
Mark Evelyn Heath, CMG	17 October 1980	British Minister of the Holy See, appointed on the occasion of the Queen's state visit to the Vatican City	
Sir Ronald Arculus, KCMG	20 October 1980	HM Ambassador in Rome, appointed on the occasion of the Queen's state visit to Italy	
John Henry Lambert, CMG	23 October 1980	HM Ambassador in Tunis, appointed on the occasion of the Queen's state visit to Tunisia	
Richard Stanley Faber, CMG	26 October 1980	HM Ambassador in Algiers, appointed on the occasion of the Queen's state visit to Algeria	
Simon Yelverton Dawbarn, CMG	30 October 1980	HM Ambassador inn Rabat, appointed on the occasion of the Queen's state visit to Morocco	
Hugh Evelyn Lockhart-Mummery	31 December 1980	Serjeant Surgeon to the Queen	
Peter Francis Thorne, CBE	31 December 1980	Serjeant-at-Arms, House of Commons	
Walter John George Verco, CVO	31 December 1980	Norroy and Ulster King of Arms	
Hugh Penderel Janion	11 February 1981	Flag Officer, Royal Yachts	
Francis Anthony Gray	26 March 1981	Secretary and Keeper of the Records, Duchy of Cornwall	
Gillian Gerda Brown, CMG	13 June 1981	HM Ambassador in Oslo, appointed on the occasion of the Queen's state visit to Norway	
The Rt Rev. Gerald Alexander Ellison	13 May 1981	Bishop of London	
The Marchioness of Abergavenny, CVO	13 June 1981	Lady of the Bedchamber to the Queen	
Henry Nelson Clowes, CVO, DSO, OBE	13 June 1981	Lieutenant, Honourable Corps of Gentlemen-at-Arms	
The Very Rev. Hugh Osborne Douglas, CBE	13 June 1981	Dean of the Chapel Royal in Scotland	
John Frederick Dame Johnston, CVO, MC	13 June 1981	Comptroller, Lord Chamberlain's Office	
The Baron Hamilton of Dalzell, MC	2 July 1981	Lord in Waiting to the Queen	
Christopher Southcote Aston	23 July 1981	Chairman, International Year of the Disabled, and Chairman, Disabled Sports Foundation	
Ernest Richard Wheeler, CVO, MBE	28 July 1981	Clerk of the Council, Duchy of the Lancaster	
Keith Douglas Seaman, KStJ, OBE	12 October 1981	Governor of South Australia, appointed on the occasion of the Queen's visit to Australia	
John William Nicholas, CMG	25 October 1981	High Commissioner to Sri Lanka, appointed on the occasion of the Queen's visit to Sri Lanka	
Leslie William Townsend, CBE	18 December 1981	Defence Services Secretary	
Alice Anne Wall, CVO	31 December 1981	Extra Woman of the Bedchamber to the Queen and Assistant Private Secretary	
William Frederick Payne Heseltine, CB, CVO	31 December 1981	Deputy Private Secretary to the Queen	
Miles Buckley Wingate	31 December 1981	Deputy Master, Trinity House	
Roger William Houssemayne du Boulay, CMG, CVO	26 March 1982	Vice-Marshal of the Diplomatic Corps	
The Hon. Mary Anne Morrison, CVO	12 June 1982	Woman of the Bedchamber to the Queen	
Simon Claud Michael Bland, CVO	12 June 1982	Comptroller, Private Secretary and Equerry to Princess Alice; Private Secretary to the Duke and Duchess of Gloucester	
Peter Richard Buckley, CVO	12 June 1982	Private Secretary to the Duke and Duchess of Kent	
The Baron Porchester, KBE	12 June 1982	Racing Manager to the Queen	
Richard Lyall Sharp, CB	12 June 1982	Ceremonial Office, Management and Personnel Office	
Sir James Maxwell Ramsay, KCMG, CBE, DSC	8 October 1982	Governor of Queensland, appointed on the occasion of the Queen's visit to Australia.	
The Hon. Ratu Sir Penaia Kanatabatu Ganilau, KBE, CMG, DSO	31 October 1982	Deputy Prime Minister of Fiji, appointed on the occasion of the Queen's visit to Fiji	
Edmund Frank Grove, CVO	3 November 1982	Chief Accountant, Privy Purse Office	
Alexander Colin Cole, CVO, TD	31 December 1982	Garter Principal King of Arms	
Henry Desmond Allen Langley, MBE	11 February 1983	General Officer Commanding, London District	
Crispin Charles Cervantes Tickell, MVO	22 February 1983	HM Ambassador in Mexico, appointed on the occasion of the Queen's visit to Mexico	
The Marquess of Lothian	20 May 1983	Lord Warden of the Stannaries	
Donald Frederick Murray, CMG	27 May 1983	HM Ambassador in Stockholm, appointed on the occasion of the Queen's visit to Sweden	
Charles Matthew Farrer, CVO	11 June 1983	Private Solicitor to the Queen	
John Michael Moore, CB, DSC	11 June 1983	Second Crown Estate Commissioner	
Frank Mills, CMG	16 November 1983	High Commissioner to Bangladesh, appointed on the occasion of the Queen's state visit to Bangladesh	
Sir Robert Lucian Wade-Gery, KCMG	25 November 1983	For services in the Queen's Flight	
Lady Susan Katherine Hussey, CVO	31 December 1983	Woman of the Bedchamber to the Queen	
Richard Harries Davies, CVO, CBE	22 March 1984	Assistant Private Secretary to the Duke of Edinburgh	
Alan Bedford Urwick, CMG	30 March 1984	HM Ambassador in Amman, appointed on the occasion of the Queen's visit to Jordan	
Kathryn Edith Helen Dugdale, CVO	16 June 1984	Woman of the Bedchamber to the Queen	
Jean Mary Monica Maxwell-Scott, CVO	16 June 1984	Lady-in-Waiting to Princess Alice, Duchess of Gloucester	
Alastair Sturgis Aird, CVO	16 June 1984	Comptroller and Extra Equerry to Queen Elizabeth the Queen Mother	
Hugh Trefusis Brassey, OBE, MC	31 December 1984	Lieutenant, Yeoman of the Guard	
Sir Hew Fleetwood Hamilton-Dalrymple, Bt, CVO	31 December 1984	Adjutant, Royal Company of Archers	
Sir David George House, GCB, CBE, MC	31 December 1984	Gentleman Usher of the Black Rod	
Russell Dillon Wood, CVO, VRD	31 December 1984	Deputy Treasurer to the Queen	
Joseph Michael Palmer	21 March 1985	Defence Services Secretary	
Hugh Campbell Byatt, CMG	28 March 1985	HM Ambassador in Lisbon, appointed on the occasion of the Queen's state visit to Portugal	
Paul Wollven Greening	16 August 1985	Flag Officer, Royal Yachts	
Giles Lionel Bullard, CMG	25 October 1985	Appointed on the occasion of the Queen's visit to the Caribbean	
Frank Milton Blackman, CVO, OBE	29 October 1985	Appointed on the occasion of the Queen's visit to the Caribbean	
Martin Seymour Berthoud, CMG	2 November 1985	Appointed on the occasion of the Queen's visit to the Caribbean	
The Very Rev. Edward Frederick Carpenter	28 November 1985	Dean of Westminster	
The Baron Franks, OM, GCMG, KCB, CBE	17 December 1985	Lord Warden of the Stannaries and Member of the Prince's Council of the Duchy of Cornwall	
Piers Bengough, OBE	31 December 1985	HM Representative at Ascot	
Hon. Eustace Hubert Beilby Gibbs, CMG	31 December 1985		
Peter Tremayne Miles	31 December 1985	Keeper of the Privy Purse, Treasurer to the Queen	
James Ainsworth Campden Gabriel Eyre, CVO, CBE	11 February 1986	General Officer Commander, London District	
Anthony Gerald Hurrell, CMG	21 February 1986	HM Ambassador in Kathmandu, appointed on the occasion of the Queen's state visit to Nepal	
John Walter Yeoman Higgs	7 March 1986	Secretary and Keeper of the Records, Duchy of Cornwall	
Geoffrey de Bellaigue, CVO	14 June 1986	Surveyor of the Queen's Works of Art	
Sir Richard Mark Evans, KCMG	18 October 1986	HM Ambassador in Peking, appointed on the occasion of the Queen's visit to China	
John Charles Batten	31 December 1986	Physician to the Queen and Head of the Medical Household	
William Reginald James Pullen, CVO	31 December 1986	Receiver-General, Chapter Clerk and Registrar, Westminster Abbey	
George Victor Sheridan le Fanu	13 June 1987	Serjeant-at-Arms attending the Speaker, House of Commons	
Harold Haywood, OBE	31 December 1987	Director, The Royal Jubilee and The Prince's Trusts	
Gerrard Charles Peat	31 December 1987	Privy Purse Auditor	
The Very. Rev. Alan Brunskill Webster	31 December 1987	Dean of St Paul's Cathedral	
Richard Charles Fairfax Peirse, CB	9 March 1988	Defence Services Secretary	
The Rt Rev. Dr Richard David Say	31 March 1988	High Almoner to the Queen	
Robert Andrew St George Martin, OBE	11 June 1988	Lord Lieutenant of Leicestershire	
William Bertram Swan, CBE, TD	11 June 1988	Lord Lieutenant of Berwickshire	
Lord Nicholas Charles Gordon-Lennox, KCMG, LVO	24 October 1988	HM Ambassador in Madrid, appointed on the occasion of the Queen's state visit to Spain.	
John de Milt Severne, LVO, OBE, AFC	15 December 1988	Captain of the Queen's Flight	
Mary Elizabeth Hedley-Miller, CB	31 December 1988	Ceremonial Officer, Cabinet Office	
Sir Charles Annand Fraser, CVO	31 December 1988	Purse Bearer to the Lord High Commissioner, Scotland	
Hon. Angus James Bruce Ogilvy	31 December 1988	For services to The Prince's Youth Business Trust	
Hon. Gordon William Nottage Palmer, OBE, TD	31 December 1988	Lord Lieutenant of Berkshire	
Kenneth Maxwell Stoddart, AE	31 December 1988	Lord Lieutenant of Merseyside	
Christopher John Airy, CBE	16 June 1989	General Officer Commanding, London District	
Lady Elizabeth Basset, CVO	17 June 1989	Woman of the Bedchamber to Queen Elizabeth the Queen Mother	
Edwin Hardy Amies, CVO	17 June 1989	For personal services	
Shane Gabriel Basil Blewitt, CVO	17 June 1989	Keeper of the Privy Purse	
Robert Fellowes, CB, LVO	17 June 1989	Private Secretary to the Queen	
Charles Mortimer Tollemache Smith-Ryland	17 June 1989	Lord Lieutenant of Warwickshire	
The Rt Rev. Michael Ashley Mann	16 July 1989	Dean of Windsor	
The Rt Rev. John Monier Bickersteth	3 August 1989	Clerk of the Closet and Head of HM College of Chaplains	
Michael Edmund Pike, CMG	11 October 1989	British High Commissioner in Singapore, appointed on the occasion of the Queen's visit to Singapore	
John Nicholas Teague Spreckley, CMG	20 October 1989	British High Commissioner in Kuala Lumpur, appointed on the occasion of the Queen's visit to Malaysia	
Desmond Hind Garrett Rice, CVO, CBE	28 November 1989	Secretary, Central Chancery of the Orders of Knighthood, and Registrar, Royal Victorian Order	
Hon. Sir John Francis Harcourt Baring, CVO	30 December 1989	Chairman, Barings Plc.	
Robert Andrew Scarth Macrae, MBE	30 December 1989	Lord Lieutenant of Orkney	
George Douglas Pinker, CVO	30 December 1989	Surgeon-Gynaecologist to the Queen	
Kenneth Bertram Adam Scott, CMG	30 December 1989	Assistant Private Secretary to the Queen	
William Willatt Slack	8 March 1990	Serjeant Surgeon to the Queen	
Frances Campbell-Preston, CVO	16 June 1990	Woman of the Bedchamber to Queen Elizabeth the Queen Mother	
Allan Macdonald Gilmour, OBE, MC	16 June 1990	Lord Lieutenant of Sutherland	
Malcolm Rognvald Innes of Edingight, CVO	16 June 1990	Secretary, Order of the Thistle, and Lord Lyon King of Arms	
Bryce Muir Knox, MC, TD	16 June 1990	Lord Lieutenant of Ayr and Arran	
Arthur John Stewart Griffin, LVO	16 June 1990	Press Secretary and Extra Equerry to Queen Elizabeth the Queen Mother	
Richard Radford Best, CBE	26 June 1990	HM Ambassador in Reykjavik, appointed on the occasion of the Queen's state visit to Iceland	
John Garnier, CBE, LVO	16 August 1990	Flag Officer, Royal Yachts, and Extra Equerry to the Queen	
David Iser Smith, CVO, AO	19 August 1990	Official Secretary to the Governor General of Australia	
Richard Arthur Frederick Dobbs	31 December 1990	Lord Lieutenant of County Antrim	
Hanmer Cecil Hanbury, LVO	31 December 1990	Lord Lieutenant of Bedfordshire	
Sir John Nicholas Henderson, GCMG	31 December 1990	Lord Warden of the Stannaries, Duchy of Cornwall	
Julian St John Loyd, CVO	31 December 1990	Land Agent at Sandringham	
Sir John Charles Chisholm Richards, KCB	31 December 1990	Marshal of the Diplomatic Corps	
David Allen, CBE	26 March 1991	Defence Services Secretary	
John Edward Powis Titman, CVO	26 April 1991	Secretary, Lord Chamberlain's Office	
The Rt Rev. Graham Douglas Leonard	1 May 1991	Bishop of London and Dean of the Chapels Royal	
David Henry Butter, MC	15 June 1991	Lord Lieutenant of Perth and Kinross	
David Burdett Money-Coutts	15 June 1991	Chairman, Coutts and Company	
Roger de Grey	15 June 1991	President, Royal Academy of Arts	
Martin St John Valentine Gibbs, CB, DSO, TD	15 June 1991	Lord Lieutenant of Gloucestershire	
Simon Christie Cooper	25 July 1991	General Officer Commanding, London District	
The Very Rev. Professor Robert Alexander Stewart Barbour, MC	4 July 1991	Dean of the Chapel Royal in Scotland	
Walter Kieran Prendergast, CMG	18 October 1991	High Commissioner to Zimbabwe, appointed on the occasion of the Queen's state visit to Zimbabwe	
Roger Blaise Ramsay Hervey, CMG	20 November 1991	Vice Marshal of the Diplomatic Corps, and Assistant Under Secretary of State (Protocol)	
Mona Mitchell, CVO	31 December 1991	Private Secretary and Extra Lady-in-Waiting to Princess Alexandra, the Hon. Lady Ogilvy	
Sir John Gingell, GBE, KCB	31 December 1991	Gentleman Usher of the Black Rod	
Lord Napier and Ettrick, CVO	31 December 1991	Private Secretary, Comptroller and Treasurer to Princess Margaret, Countess of Snowden	
David Rodney Sweetnam, CBE	31 December 1991	Orthopaedic Surgeon to the Queen	
Sir David John Hallifax, KCB, KBE	30 April 1992	Constable and Governor of Windsor Castle	
Peter Gordon Wallis, CMG	29 May 1992	British High Commissioner to Malta, appointed on the occasion of the Queen's visit to Malta	
Peter Cecil Clarke, CVO	13 June 1992	Chief Clerk, Duchy of Lancaster, and Extra Equerry to Princess Alexandra, the Hon. Lady Ogilvy	
Geoffrey Ivor de Deney, CVO	13 June 1992	Clerk of the Privy Council	
Robin John Dent	13 June 1992	Treasurer, King Edward's Hospital Fund	
Henry Nicholas Nevile	13 June 1992	Lord Lieutenant of Lincolnshire	
Prince Michael of Kent	4 July 1992		
Michael St Edmund Burton, CMG, CVO	23 October 1992	Minister and Head of Mission in Berlin, appointed on the occasion of the Queen's state visit to Germany	
Michael David Tims, CVO	15 December 1992	Serjeant-at-Arms to the Queen	
John Robin Catford, CBE	31 December 1992	Secretary for Appointments to the Prime Minister and Ecclesiastical Secretary to the Lord Chancellor	
Dr Anthony Michael Dawson	31 December 1992	Physician to the Queen and Head of the Medical Household	
Sir Ashley Charles Gibbs Ponsonby, Bt, MC	31 December 1992	Member, Council of the Duchy of Lancaster	
The Baron Younger of Prestwick, TD	31 December 1992	Chairman of the Royal Anniversary Trust, appointed on the occasion of the 40th Anniversary of the Queen's Accession	
Norman James Blacklock, CVO, OBE	7 May 1993	Medical Officer to the Queen Abroad	
John Allan Birch, CMG	7 May 1993	HM Ambassador in Budapest, appointed on the occasion of the Queen's state visit to Hungary	
Peter Hilton, MC	12 June 1993	Lord Lieutenant of Derbyshire	
David William Neil Landale	12 June 1993	Secretary and Keeper of the Records, Duchy of Cornwall	
Geoffrey Walter Fownes Luttrell, MC	12 June 1993	Lord Lieutenant of Somerset	
Brian Henry McGrath, CVO	12 June 1993	Treasurer and Head of the Duke of Edinburgh's Household	
Hon. Edward Nicholas Canning Beaumont, CVO	31 December 1993	Clerk of the Course and Secretary to the Ascot Authority	
John Robert Stratford Dugdale	31 December 1993	Lord Lieutenant of Shropshire	
Simon Peter Edmund Cosmo William Towneley	31 December 1993	Lord Lieutenant of Lancashire	
Michael William McCorkell, OBE, TD	11 June 1994	Lord Lieutenant of County Londonderry	
The Baron Somerleyton	11 June 1994	Master of the Horse	
Conrad Marshall John Fisher Swan, CVO	11 June 1994	Garter Principal King of Arms	
Blair Aubyn Stewart-Wilson, CVO	11 June 1994	Deputy Master of the Royal Household	
Robert John Swan Corbett, CB	21 June 1994	General Officer Commanding, London District	
The Countess of Airlie, CVO	31 December 1994	Lady of the Bedchamber to the Queen	
Lady Grimthorpe, CVO	31 December 1994	Lady of the Bedchamber to Queen Elizabeth the Queen Mother	
Thomas Raymond Dunne	31 December 1994	Lord Lieutenant of Hereford and Worcester	
Philip Malcolm Edge	31 December 1994	Deputy Master and Chairman of the Board, Trinity House	
David Courtenay Mansel-Lewis	31 December 1994	Lord Lieutenant of Dyfed	
Henry Louis Carron Greig, CVO, CBE	21 February 1995	Gentleman Usher to the Queen	
Sir Anthony Reeve, KCMG	21 March 1995	HM Ambassador to South Africa, appointed on the occasion of the Queen's state visit to South Africa	
Robert Nathaniel Woodard	25 March 1995	Flag Officer of Royal Yachts, appointed on the occasion of the Queen's state visit to South Africa	
Sir William Richard Scott Thomas, KCB, OBE	9 May 1995	Gentleman Usher of the Black Rod	
Lady Mary Katherine Mumford, CVO	17 June 1995	Lady-in-Waiting to Princess Alexandra, the Hon. Lady Ogilvy	
The Viscount Boyne	17 June 1995	Lord-in-Waiting to the Queen	
The Very Rev. William James Morris	17 June 1995	Dean of the Chapel Royal in Scotland	
Richard Hanbury-Tenison	17 June 1995	Lord Lieutenant of Gwent	
John Brook Marriott, CVO	27 July 1995	Keeper of the Royal Philatelic Collection	
The Rt Rev. David Michael Hope	26 October 1995	Bishop of London and Dean of the Chapels Royal	
Michael John Llewellyn Smith, CMG	25 March 1996	HM Ambassador in Warsaw, appointed on the occasion of the Queen's state visit to Poland	
The Very Rev. Thomas Eric Evans	15 June 1996	Dean of St Paul's Cathedral	
James Hugh Neill, CBE, TD	15 June 1996	Lord Lieutenant of South Yorkshire	
Anthony St John Howard Figgis, CMG	27 June 1996	Vice-Marshal of the Diplomatic Corps	
Aubrey Leland Oakes, Baron Buxton of Alsa, MC	25 October 1996		
The Rt Rev. John Waine	7 November 1996	Clerk of the Closet	
James William Hodge, CMG	30 October 1996		
The Very Rev. Michael Clement Otway Mayne	4 December 1996	Dean of Westminster	
John Luke Lowther, CBE	30 December 1996	Lord-Lieutenant of Northamptonshire	
The Rt Rev. John Bernard Taylor	27 March 1997	Lord High Almoner	
John Nigel Courtenay James, CBE	14 June 1997	Secretary and Keeper of the Records, Duchy of Cornwall	
Richard Eustace Thornton, OBE	14 June 1997	Lord Lieutenant of Surrey	
Maj.-Gen. Iain Charles Mackay-Dick, MBE	15 July 1997	General Officer Commanding London District	
Lt-Col. Peter Evan Wyldbore Gibbs, CVO	6 October 1997		
David John Michael Dain, CMG	7 October 1997		
Hon. Sir David Alwyn Gore-Booth, KCMG	13 October 1997		
Robin Berry Janvrin, CB, CVO	31 December 1997	Deputy Private Secretary to the Queen	
Lt-Col. John St Aubyn Parker, The Earl of Morley	31 December 1997	Lord-Lieutenant of Devon	
Michael Charles Gerrard Peat, CVO	31 December 1997	Keeper of the Privy Purse and Treasurer to the Queen	
Allen John George, Baron Sheppard of Didgemere	31 December 1997	Chairman of Business in the Community	
Col. Sir John Vernon Wills, Bt, TD	31 December 1997	Lord-Lieutenant of Somerset and former Lord-Lieutenant of Avon	
Maj.-Gen. Michael Frederick Hobbs, CBE	13 June 1998	Director of The Duke of Edinburgh's Award	
William Richard Michael Oswald, CVO	13 June 1998	Director of the Royal Studs	
The Very Rev. Patrick Reynolds Mitchell	24 July 1998	Dean of Windsor	
Malcolm Blanch, CVO	4 August 1998	Clerk Comptroller, Household of Queen Elizabeth the Queen Mother	
Ivan Callan, CMG	17 September 1998		
David Joseph Moss, CMG	20 September 1998		
Nigel Hamilton Nicholls, CBE	21 October 1998	Clerk of the Privy Council	
Deborah Vivien, The Duchess of Devonshire	31 December 1998	Trustee, Royal Collection Trust	
Edward Henry Kenelm, The Lord Digby, JP	31 December 1998	Lord-Lieutenant of Dorset	
Col. Sir Ralph Harry Carr-Ellison, TD	31 December 1998	Lord-Lieutenant of Tyne and Wear	
Patrick John Holmes Sellors, LVO	31 December 1998	Surgeon-Oculist	
Stephen David Reid Brown	19 April 1999		
Gen. Sir Charles Patrick Ralph Palmer, KBE	11 July 1999	Constable and Governor of Windsor Castle	
Dame Maeve Geraldine Fort, DCMG	9 November 1999	High Commissioner to South Africa, appointed on the occasion of the Queen's state visit to South Africa	
Maj.-Gen. Peter Aldcroft Downward, CB, DSO, DFC	12 June 1999	Governor of the Military Knights of Windsor	
Christopher Kingston Howes, CB, CVO	12 June 1999	Second Commissioner and Chief Executive, Crown Estate	
Lt-Col. Walter Hugh Malcolm Ross, CVO, OBE	12 June 1999	Comptroller, Lord Chamberlain's Office	
Anthony James Merifield, CB	31 December 1999	Ceremonial Officer, Cabinet Office	
Michael Kershaw Ridley, CVO	17 June 2000	Clerk of the Council, Duchy of Lancaster	
Maj. Michael John Parker, CVO, CBE	4 August 2000	Producer of the Queen Elizabeth the Queen Mother Centenary Tribute	
Maj.-Gen. Evelyn John Webb-Carter, OBE	4 August 2000	Chairman, Queen Elizabeth the Queen Mother Centenary Tribute Committee	
John Alan Shepherd, CMG	16 October 2000		
Vice-Adm. Sir James Lamb Weatherall, KBE	30 December 2000	Marshal of the Diplomatic Corps	
Air Comm. the Hon. Timothy Charles Elworthy, CVO, CBE	30 March 2001	Director, Royal Travel, and Senior Air Equerry to the Queen	
Richard Nigel Dales, CMG	30 May 2001		
Hugh Ashley Roberts, CVO	16 June 2001	Director, Royal Collection, and Surveyor of the Queen's Works of Art	
Rear-Adm. Patrick Barton Rowe, CBE, LVO	31 December 2001	Deputy Master and Chairman of the Corporate Board of the Corporation of Trinity House	
Lt-Col. Robert Christie Stewart, CBE, TD	31 December 2001	Lord Lieutenant of Clackmannanshire	
John Christopher Parsons, CVO	15 January 2002	Deputy Treasurer to the Queen	
Marsom Henry Boyd-Carpenter, CVO	3 April 2002	Queen's Private Solicitor	
Stephen Mark Jeffrey Lamport, CVO	15 June 2002	Private Secretary and Treasurer to the Prince of Wales	
Col. John Bradford Timmins, OBE, TD, JP	15 June 2002	Lord Lieutenant of Greater Manchester	
Lt-Col. Seymour Vivian Gilbart-Denham, CVO	30 July 2002	Crown Equerry	
Thomas Andrew Shebbeare, CVO	31 December 2002	Chief Executive Officer, The Prince's Trust	

Source up to July 1996: Galloway et al., 1996, pp. 131–135
