= William Thomas (MP for Old Sarum and Downton) =

Welsh scholar and politician (died 1554)

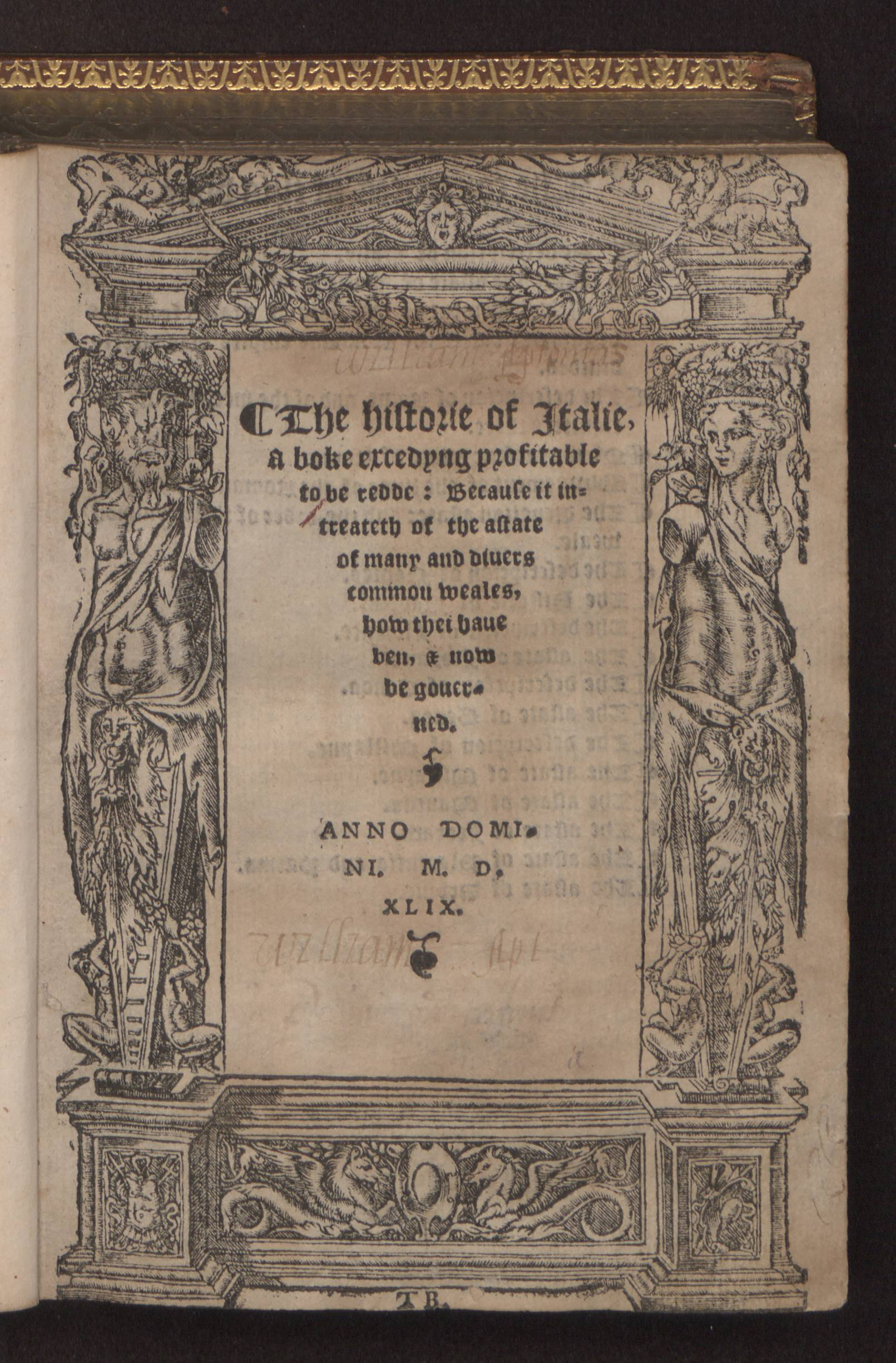
The historie of Italie, 1549

William Thomas (died 18 May 1554), a Welshman from Llanigon, Brecknockshire, was a scholar of Italian and Italian history, politician and a clerk of the Privy Council under Edward VI. Thomas was executed for treason after the collapse of Wyatt's Rebellion under Mary I.

== Early years ==
Thomas was a native of Llanigon, and brother to Sir Miles Thomas, clerk of Meline, Pembrokeshire and of Llanigon as shown in the Heraldic Visitations of Wales by Lewis Dwnn. His biographer in The History of Parliament has estimated his birth year as "by 1524". He was presumably educated at Oxford University, where a person of both his name was admitted bachelor of the canon law on 2 December 1529. He may also have been the William Thomas who, along with two other commissioners, inquired into and reported on 27 January 1534 to Thomas Cromwell from Ludlow on certain extortions in Radnorshire and the Welsh marches.

== Early work ==
In 1544 he was, according to his own account "constrained by misfortune to abandon the place of his nativity", perhaps for his religious opinions. He spent the next five years abroad, chiefly in Italy, and is mentioned in 1545 as being commissioned to pay some money to Sir Anthony Browne in Venice. In February 1547, when the news of the death of Henry VIII reached Italy, Thomas was at Bologna, where, in the course of a discussion with some Italian gentlemen, he defended the personal character and public policy of the deceased king. He subsequently drew up a narrative of the discussion, and an Italian version was issued abroad in 1552. There is a copy in the British Library bearing the title, II Pellegrino Inglese ne'l quale si defende l' innocente & la sincera vita de'l pio & religioso re d' Inghilterra Henrico ottauo. He also wrote, but did not publish, an English version, to which he added a dedication to the Italian poet Pietro Aretino, and a copy of this, possibly in Thomas's own writing, is preserved among the Cottonian MSS. at the British Museum. Thomas's work is specially valuable as representing the popular view of the character of Henry VIII current in England at the time of his death. It is not free from mistakes, but the Victorian historian James Anthony Froude wrote of it that it had "the accuracies and the inaccuracies" which might be naturally expected "in any account of a series of intricate events given by memory without the assistance of documents".

From Bologna Thomas appears to have gone to Padua, whence on 3 February 1549 he forwarded to his "verie good friende Maister [John] Tamwoorth at Venice" an Italian primer which he had undertaken at his request. This Tamworth showed to Sir Walter Mildmay, who, approving of it, "caused it to be put in printe", under the title of Principal Rules of the Italian Grammer, with a Dictionarie for the better understandynge of Boccace, Petrarcha, and Dante, gathered into this tongue by William Thomas. It was printed by Berthelet in 1550, subsequent editions being brought out by H. Wykes in 1560 and 1567, and by T. Powell in 1562. This was the first work of its kind in English.

During the summer of 1549 Thomas appears to have returned to England "highly fam'd for his travels through France and Italy", and bringing home with him another work, the result of his Italian studies, which was also published by Berthelet under the title The Historie of Italie ... (1549). This work was dedicated, under the date of 20 September 1549, to John Dudley, Earl of Warwick. It is believed to have been suppressed and publicly burnt, probably after Thomas's execution, yet it was twice reprinted by Thomas Marshe, in 1561 and (with cuts) in 1562.

He was elected Member of Parliament for Old Sarum in the parliament called in 1549, but did not serve the entire term.

== Appointments to Edward VI ==
On 19 April 1550, partly owing to his knowledge of modern languages, but chiefly perhaps for his defence of the late king, Thomas was appointed one of the clerks of the privy council, and was sworn in on the same day at Greenwich. Possibly a portion of the register of the council for the next year is in his autograph.

The new clerk had "his fortunes to make", and, though not a spiritual person, he 'greedily affected a certain good prebend of St. Paul's', which, doubtless at his instigation, the council on 23 June 1550 agreed to settle on him. Ridley, who had intended this preferment for his chaplain Grindal, stigmatised Thomas as "an ungodly man", and resisted the grant, but without success; for when the prebend fell vacant, it was conveyed to the king, "for the furnishing of his stables", and its emoluments granted to Thomas. This "unreasonable piece of covetousness" was, in John Strype's opinion, "the greatest blur sticking upon" Thomas's character.

Among many other grants which Thomas received was that of the tolls of Presteign, Builth, and 'Elvael' in Radnorshire on 27 December 1551, and the parsonage of Presteign with the patronage of the vicarage on 26 October 1552. These were in addition to a sum of £248 previously given him "by waie of rewarde", 7 January 1551 In April 1551 he was appointed member of the embassy which, with the Marquis of Northampton at its head, proceeded in June to the French king, to negotiate the marriage of Princess Elizabeth of France to Edward. To cover his expenses, he was granted imprests amounting to £300; and on 26 June he was despatched to England with letters to the council asking for further instructions, with which he probably returned to France.

While clerk of the council Thomas became a sort of political instructor to the young king, who appears to have narrowly watched the proceedings of his council, and, without the knowledge of its members, sought Thomas's opinion on their policy and on the principles of government generally. The nature of this teaching may be gathered from a series of eighty-five questions drawn by Thomas for the king, and still preserved, along with a prefatory letter, in his own writing at the British Museum; they were printed in Strype's Ecclesiastical Memorials. Another autograph manuscript in the same collection contains six political discourses confidentially written for the king. These were published in their entirety, while that treating of foreign affairs was summarised by Burnet, and printed by Froude. Some further commonplaces of state drawn up by Thomas for the king's use are also printed in Strype. Froude suggests that Thomas's teaching, if not his hand, is also perceptible in the king's journal. He also dedicated to the king as "a poore newe yeres gift", probably in January 1551, an English translation from the Italian of Josaphat Barbaro's account of his voyages to the east, which had been first published in Venice in 1543. With an introduction by Lord Stanley of Alderley, Thomas's translation was published by the Hakluyt Society in a volume of Travels to Tana and Persia (London, 1873). Thomas's manuscript is still preserved at the British Library.

He was MP for Downton, Wiltshire in the young king's last parliament, called in March 1553.

== Charges of treason ==
Influential as was Thomas's position at court, it was not free from danger, and, realising this, he vainly asked to be sent on government business to Venice. On the accession of Mary I, Thomas lost all his preferments, including his employment at court, because "he had (it is said) imbibed the principles of Christopher Goodman against the regimen of women, and too freely vented them". He attached himself to the ultra-Protestant party, and according to Bale designed the murder of Bishop Gardiner, but of this there is no evidence. He took an active part in Sir Thomas Wyatt's conspiracy. On 27 December 1553 he left London for Mohuns Ottery in Devonshire, the residence of Sir Peter Carew, who was the leader of the disaffected in the west; but when Carew failed to raise the west, Thomas on 2 February 1554 fled, going "from county to county, in disguise, not knowing where to conceal himself; and yet he did not desist from sending seditious bills and letters to his friends declaring his treasonable intentions, in order that he might induce them to join him in his treasons". Probably his intention was to escape to Wales, but he went no further than Gloucestershire, with which county he had some previous connection. He was arrested, and on 20 February he was committed to the Tower along with Sir Nicholas Throckmorton. Conscious "that he should suffer a shameful death", he attempted on the 26th to commit suicide "by thrusting a knife into his body under his paps, but the wound did not prove mortal". He was put on the rack with the view of extracting some statement implicating the Princess Elizabeth, and it was probably to prevent this that he attempted suicide. The chief evidence against him, apart from his sojourn at Sir Peter Carew's house, was the confession of a fellow conspirator, Sir Nicholas Arnold, who alleged that on the announcement of the proposed marriage between Mary and Philip II of Spain, Thomas "put various arguments against such marriage in writing", and finally on 22 December suggested that the difficulty might be solved by asking one John Fitzwilliams to kill the queen. This "devyse" was communicated to Sir Thomas Wyatt, who, when suing for pardon during his own trial, said that he had indignantly repudiated it. Throckmorton, however, when his own trial came on, traversed the allegations of Arnold, who (he said) sought "to discharge himself if he could so transfer the devise to William Thomas". In support of his statement he asked that the court should examine Fitzwilliams, who was prepared to give evidence, but was denied audience, at the request of the attorney-general. When, however, Thomas's own trial came on at the Guildhall on 8 May, he was found guilty of treason; and, on the 18th, was drawn upon a sled to Tyburn, where he was hanged, beheaded, and quartered, making "a right godly end", saying at his death that "he died for his country". On the following day his head was set on London Bridge "and iii. quarters set over Crepullgate", whereabouts he had perhaps previously lived.

Thomas's Restitution Act 1562
- Act of Parliament
- Parliament of England
- Long title: An Acte for the Restitucion in Bloude of Anne Thomas, daughter and Heyres of Willyam Thomas Esquier.
- Citation: 5 Eliz. 1. c. 14 Pr.
- Territorial extent: England and Wales

Dates
- Royal assent: 10 April 1563
- Commencement: 11 January 1563 (Note: Start of session.)

Status: Current legislation

In a private act of Parliament, Thomas's Restitution Act 1562 (5 Eliz. 1. c. 14 Pr.), passed after the accession of Elizabeth, Thomas's name was included among those whose heirs and children were restored in blood after their attainder, but it is not known whether he was married or had a family.

== Appreciation ==
Thomas was a shrewd observer of men and affairs, but, according to Wood, had a "hot fiery spirit", which was probably the cause of most of his troubles. He was certainly "one of the most learned of his time". His Italian grammar and dictionary were the first works of the kind published in English, while his History of Italy was formerly held in the highest esteem for its comprehensive account of the chief Italian states. All his works are remarkable for their methodical arrangement, his style is always lucid, and his English shows "much better orthography than that current at a later period".

== Bibliography ==
- Chisholm, Hugh, ed. (1911). "Thomas, William" . Encyclopædia Britannica. Vol. 26 (11th ed.). Cambridge University Press. p. 868.
- Thomas, Daniel Lleufer (1898). "Thomas, William (d.1554)" . In Lee, Sidney (ed.). Dictionary of National Biography. Vol. 56. London: Smith, Elder & Co. pp. 193–196.

Attribution

- This article incorporates text from a publication now in the public domain: Thomas, Daniel Lleufer (1898). "Thomas, William (d.1554)". In Lee, Sidney (ed.). Dictionary of National Biography. Vol. 56. London: Smith, Elder & Co. pp. 193–196.

Government offices
Preceded by Thomas Chaloner; William Honnyng; Armagil Wade	Clerk of the Privy Council; 1550–1553; With: Thomas Chaloner (1550–1552); Armagil Wade (1550–1553); Bernard Hampton (1551–1553)	Succeeded by Armagil Wade; Bernard Hampton
