= Armagil Waad =

Member of the Parliament of England

Armagil Waad (or Armigill Wade) (ca. 1511 – 20 June 1568) was a chief clerk of the Privy Council, servant of government and an English parliamentarian.

== Early life ==
He is said to have been born at Kilnsey, Yorkshire, near Conistone, and his mother's maiden name is given as Comyn. On the dissolution of the monasteries Kilnsey was granted to Sir Richard Gresham, to whom Armagil may have owed his introduction at court.

Waad was educated at Magdalen College, Oxford and graduated B.A. on 23 January 1531–2. He is then said to have entered an inn of court, possibly the Middle Temple during the period for which the records are missing, or Gray's Inn where he was later to build a chamber to which his descendants were admitted from 1565 onwards.

== Career ==
=== Exploration ===
In 1536 he joined as an adventurer in Richard Hore's voyage to North America; he sailed with Oliver Daubeney, 'Mr. Joy, afterwards gentleman of the king's chapel,' and others in the Minion from Gravesend, towards the end of April. After about two months' sailing they reached Cape Breton Island; they also visited Newfoundland and Penguin Island (now known as Funk Island). They steered a northerly course home, fell in with icebergs, though it was the middle of summer, and reached St Ives, Cornwall about the end of October. Waad is said to have written an account of this voyage, which was afterwards printed. No such work has been traced, and it is not in Hakluyt, which, however, contains an account of the voyage furnished by one of Waad's companions, Thomas Butts, son of Sir William Butts. Sir William Waad's description of his father as the first English explorer of America, subsequently paraphrased into 'the English Columbus' rests on this voyage. It has little justification. Waad has no more title to the name than his companions on the Minion, and infinitely less than the sixteen Englishmen who accompanied Sebastian Cabot, not to mention the possibility that there were English sailors among Columbus's crews.

=== Public service ===
After his return Waad seems to have entered the service of Henry VIII, probably as a messenger. In 1540, on the recommendation of Lord Maltravers, the lord deputy, Waad was promoted clerk of the council at Calais. He was promoted third clerk of the privy council in London at midsummer 1547, serving at first without a regular salary, though he was paid for special services, like arresting a Frenchman (probably Jean Ribauld) when he tried to escape to France. On 22 September 1547 he was elected member of parliament for Chipping Wycombe, and on 17 April 1548 began to draw a regular salary of fifty marks as third clerk of the council. Four years later he had risen to be chief clerk, in which capacity he was paid 50l. a year. In July 1550 he was employed as the channel of communication with the French and Spanish ambassadors, on 20 December 1551 he was ordered to make an inventory of Cuthbert Tunstall's goods, in April 1552 he brought certain accusations against the Countess of Sussex and was himself instructed to examine her in the Tower, and on 31 May following he was commissioned to procure Paget's signature to the articles against him.

The last mention of him as clerk occurs on 13 June 1553, and there can be little doubt that he lost his office on Queen Mary's accession. He also lost his seat in parliament, and possibly a post in the customs which he had bought, and of which, as he subsequently complained to Cecil, he was deprived without compensation. In 1554 he was, however, granted by the crown the manor of Milton Grange, Bedfordshire, in Milton Bryan. He also acquired lands in Kentish Town and at Lydd, Kent, and subsequently leased Belsize Park, Hampstead, which he made his home, from the dean and chapter of St. Paul's. On 17 December 1555 he was summoned to account for 800l. paid him by Sir Andrew Judd. Waad does not appear to have been restored to the clerkship of the council on the accession of Elizabeth; but on 15 April 1559 he was sent on a mission as ambassador to the Duke of Holstein. He was instructed to seek increased facilities for English merchants in the duke's dominions, to report on his relations with the free cities in his duchy, to offer Elizabeth's aid in repressing the attempts of the said 'stades' to recover their liberties and to suggest 'some further intelligence' between the duke and England for the purpose of maintaining the Augsburg Confession. In June 1562 he was sent to Rye to muster six hundred men for service at Havre, and to collect information about the movements of French parties and the readiness of the Huguenots to accept English help. In December he requested a grant of the salt marshes between Lydd and the mouth of the Camber, with license to enclose them. In 1566 he was engaged in examining at the Tower Cornelius de Alneto or Lannoy, an alchemist who had failed to redeem his promise of manufacturing gold for the queen's service.

== Family and later life ==
Waad died at Belsize on 20 June 1568, and was buried in Hampstead church, where an alabaster monument, with a long inscription was erected to his memory by his son William. Owing to the rebuilding of Hampstead church in 1745 and three subsequent restorations, no trace of the monument remains. His will was proved in the prerogative court of the archbishop of Canterbury on February 5 1569.

Waad was twice married; firstly, to Alice, daughter of Richard Patten (d. 1536), widow of Thomas Searle, and sister of William Patten, the historian of Somerset's 1547 expedition into Scotland, and secondly to Anne Marbury, the widow of Edward Bradley (d.1558), a London haberdasher. According to Waad's epitaph he had 20 children by his two wives, 14 of whom predeceased him. All his surviving children were from his first marriage. The eldest surviving son was Sir William Waad.

He was also a good Spanish scholar.

== Waad's writings ==
Besides the 'Observations' on his travels attributed to him, Waad was author of:

- The Distresses of the Commonwealth, with the Means to remedy them, an elaborate treatise preserved at the record office.
- Decastichon de receptione ducis Somerset a Londinensibus printed by Patten in his Expedicion London, 1548, 4to.
- Carmen in obitum Suffolciensium fratrum, printed in the collection of verses on the deaths of the dukes of Suffolk in 1551.

== Notes ==
Parliament of the United Kingdom
Preceded by William Dormer	Member of Parliament for Wycombe; 1547–1550	Succeeded by John Cheyne
Government offices
Preceded by Thomas Chaloner; William Honnyng; Thomas Smith	Clerk of the Privy Council; 1548–1553; With: Thomas Chaloner (1548–1552); William Honnyng (1548–1552); Bernard Hampton (1551–1553)	Succeeded by Sir Francis Allen; Bernard Hampton; William Smith
