= Clerk of the Privy Council =

Clerk of the Privy Council can refer to:

- Clerk of the Privy Council (Canada)
- Clerk of the Privy Council (United Kingdom)

== See also ==
- Clerk
- Privy council
