= Nigel Nicholls =

British civil servant (1938–2016)

Sir Nigel Hamilton Nicholls KCVO CBE (19 February 1938 – 21 December 2016) was a British civil servant.

In 1982 he was made Commander of the Order of the British Empire having worked as Assistant Secretary at the Ministry of Defence during the Falklands War. Nicholls served as Clerk of the Privy Council between 1992 and 1998. On 21 October 1998 he was knighted as Knight Commander of the Royal Victorian Order. He died on 21 December 2016.

Government offices
Preceded by Sir Geoffrey de Deney	Clerk of the Privy Council; 1992–1998	Succeeded by Alexander Kippen Galloway
