= William Bridgeman (Bramber MP) =

English civil servant and politician (c.1646–1699)

William Bridgeman FRS (c.1646 – 10 May 1699) was a senior English civil servant and MP.

He was born in Amsterdam, Netherlands, the son of Richard Bridgeman, a merchant for the East India Company and was the cousin of Sir Orlando Bridgeman, 1st Baronet, of Ridley. He entered Queen's College, Oxford, matriculating in 1662. He became a naturalised British subject in 1657 and lived at Combes Hall, near Stowmarket, Suffolk.

He became a civil servant and occupied a number of important posts, viz. Under-Secretary of State (1667–1681, 1683–1689, 1690–1692, 163–1694); Commissioner for Assessment for Westminster (1679–1680), 1689–1690); Clerk of the Privy Council (1685–1689, 1693–death); Registrar of the Ecclesiastical Commission (1687–1688); Member of the Royal Fisheries, Ireland (1692); Secretary to the Admiralty (1694–1698). He was elected a Fellow of the Royal Society in 1679.

He was also returned as MP for Bramber, Sussex for 1685 to 1687 and served as Deputy Lieutenant of Middlesex from 1692 to his death in 1699.

He had married Diana, daughter of Peter Vernatt.
