= William Honnyng =

16th-century English politician

- Born: 1520
- Died: 1569 (aged 48–49)
- Burial place: Eye, Suffolk
- Occupations: Mp, clerk of privy council
- Spouse: Frances Cutler
- Parent(s): Roger Honing and Margaret Owle

William Honnyng (1520–1569) was an English Member of Parliament and Tudor Court official who served as Clerk of the Signet and Clerk of the Privy Council under Henry VIII and Edward VI.

== Early life ==
The Honnyng (or Honing, Honning, Hunnings) family came originally from the Holland district of South Lincolnshire. The eldest child of Roger Honnyng and Margaret née Owle, William was born in 1520, most probably in London. Roger was a member of the Fishmongers' Company, with houses and shops in Oldefisshestrete in the City of London.

== Career ==
In 1538 William Honnyng obtained the post of secretary to Bishop Edmund Bonner on his appointment as Ambassador to Paris. Honnyng owed this appointment to the influence of Thomas Wriothesley. When Bonner was recalled to London, Honnyng also returned, during the summer of 1540.

On his return to London, Honnyng was appointed a clerk of the Signet, and took up the office some time after October 1541, when he was granted the next vacancy. He had, by 1542, become the servant of Thomas Wriothesley.

On 23 April 1543 Honnyng was appointed one of the two clerks of the Privy Council. The Council at that time included Thomas Cranmer, Thomas Howard, John Russell, 1st Earl of Bedford, Edward Seymour, 1st Earl of Hertford, Stephen Gardiner, Sir Anthony Wingfield, Thomas Wriothesley, John Dudley, Viscount Lisle and William Paget.

Honnyng was elected to the first Parliament of the young king Edward VI, convened on 4 November 1547, as MP for Winchester. He may have owed this appointment to the influence of Wriothesley. Honnyng was also elected as MP for Orford, Suffolk, in Edward VI's second and last parliament, in March 1553.

Half way through the reign of Edward VI, competition for power between the leading Councillors, as "Protestant" and "Catholic" factions vied for control over the boy king. Honnyng played a peripheral role in these clashes, for example helping with the arrest and subsequent prosecution of Bishop Gardiner, and acting as the Privy Council's messenger during the coup that toppled the Lord Protector Somerset in October 1549. For a brief period, after Somerset's fall, Wriothesley filled the power vacuum until he too was out-maneuvered by John Dudley, by then earl of Warwick.

With the fall of Wriothesley, Honnyng was unprotected, and was arrested by Sir Anthony Wingfield on 30 January 1550 for seeking to embezzle away the judicial papers relating to Gardiner's case. Honnyng was imprisoned in the Marshalsea prison, but eventually released, at the end of June 1550, on £200 bail. But a month later his old patron Wriothesley was dead, "amidst rumours of suicide", and Honnyng had lost his job on the Privy Council. He retained his clerkship of the Signet, and even remained in office during the transition to the reign of Mary in July 1553 and into the reign of Elizabeth I.

By the Summer of 1560, in addition to remaining clerk of the Signet, Honnyng was taken on by Thomas Radclyffe, 3rd Earl of Sussex, as his Court Correspondent, while Radclyffe was on campaign in Ireland.

in 1561 Honnyng entered Gray's Inn, in the same intake as Thomas Radcliffe, Roger, Lord North, and Thomas Howard, 4th Duke of Norfolk. At that time Gray's Inn was a fashionable place for noblemen and country gentlemen to send their sons, even though some 90% would not actually be called to the Bar. Along with legal training, the Inn provided a good venue for 'masques and revels'. The following year, in 1562, Honnyng was appointed a Justice of the Peace for Suffolk, and by 1564 was 'of the Quorum'. In 1566 Honnyng was appointed to the Suffolk Commission of Sewers (responsible for sea and river defences, and maintaining the Fennland drainage system).

== Marriage and children ==
Honnyng married Frances Cutler, the daughter of Nicholas Cutler, MP, by Eleanor Mynne (daughter of John Mynne and a first cousin of Thomas Wriothesley). They had fourteen children:

- Jane (1542–1557)
- Elzabethe
- Frannces
- Catterin
- Anne (born 1548)
- Edward (21 May 1550 – 1609), heir, and MP for Dunwich, Suffolk in 1589, and MP for Eye in 1593 – 1604. Edward married Ursula Wingfield, a granddaughter of Sir Anthony Wingfield PC KG.
- William (1552 – c.1610), clerk of the Office of the Revels during the time William Shakespeare was putting on plays at Court.
- Henry (11 February 1553 – 22 January 1635) a leading participant in the Jacobean Plantation of Fermanagh.
- Nicholas (born 13 May 1555)
- Joan (born 8 August 1556)
- John (19 January 1558 (ns) – 1585) a sea captain who served in Elizabeth's war against Spain in the Netherlands, dying at the Battle of Arnhem in 1585. Four portraits of John survive, at the V&A, at the Wellcome Library, at Queens' College Cambridge, and one in a private collection.
- Thomas
- Franccis, Receiver of Crown Rents for Suffolk and Cambridgeshire.
- James (born 1562) servant of Henry Wriothesley, 3rd Earl of Southampton whom James accompanied to Ireland in 1599.
- Charles, captain in the expeditionary forces of Robert Dudley, 1st Earl of Leicester in December 1585, and Lord Willoughby's campaign into France in September 1589, during which he died.
- Roger
- Robert

== Death ==
Honnyng died on 11 November 1569 and was buried in an 'altar tomb' within the parish church of Eye, Suffolk. In his 1566 will, Honnyng left extensive lands in Suffolk, London and Gloucestershire. Most of the property went to his heir, Edward, who left it to his son Wingfield Honning. A lengthy court battle arose, as Edward Honning had left no will, and his son Wingfield Honning was mentally disabled; most of the wealth was gradually lost as the family fought moves by the unscrupulous lawyer John Cusacke and Baron Sotherton.

== Tomb ==
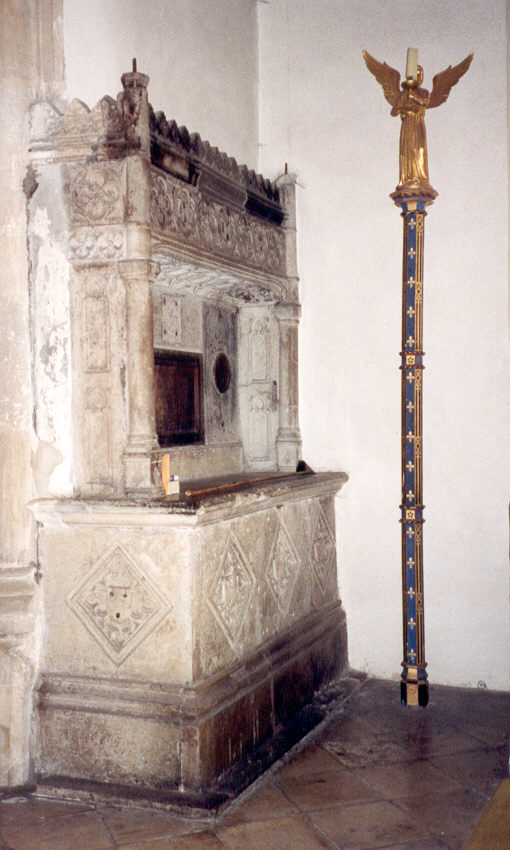
Honnyng tomb

The 'Alter Tomb' of William Honnyng and his wife Frances survives in the parish church at Eye. Although badly damaged, with its shields and other decoration removed, the inscription remains visible:-

Qui fuit eximio virtutu robore septus
Prudentisq viri noie notus erat
Qui patriæ charus cuctis dilect, et avlæ
Gratus erat sumo clarveratq loco
Consilii decreta sua qui scripserat arte
Regiaq emisit signa notata manu
Quinq ferens decies ferme natalib, anos
Hic Honyngus iam Gulielm, inest:
Homo humana humo: virtus: post: funera.

"Here lies William Honyngs who was surrounded by the noble strength of virtues and was known by the name of a prudent man, who was dear to his native land, and beloved by all and held in favour at Court who had written his council decrees with his clear and true art at the highest level and who put forth Royal decrees written by hand, having lived almost fifty years from his birth. Man goes to the earth; human virtue lasts after the funeral."

On either side of the central inscription are the circular memorials to William and Frances:

Guli: Obiit 11 die Novembris Anno D’ni 1569 (William: Died 11th day of November Anno Domini 1 569)
Fran, Obiit ... die A .... Anno D’ni ..... (Frances: Died ... day of A ... Anno Domini ... ...)

== References and further reading ==
- Alexander, G M V, 'Edmund Bonner', PhD Thesis, London University 1960
- Archdale, Henry Blackwood: Memoirs of the Archdales, Enniskillen, 1925, p. 11-12
- Barry, T. Life and Family History of William Honnyng, London, 2008
- Bindoff, S (editor), History of Parliament, London 1982
- Collectanea Topographica et Genealogica (CT&G), vol vii
- Foster, W E, Hunnings Families, Pollard & Co, Exeter, 1912
- Foxe, John, 'Actes and Monuments', vol 6 pp. 71, 153, 260
- Haskett-Smith, Fishmongers Apprentices and Freemen. London, 1916
- Hoak, Dale, The King's Council in the Reign of Edward VI, Cambridge, 1976, p. 257
- Levy Peck, Linda, "Beyond The Pale: John Cusacke And The Language Of Absolutism In Early Stuart Britain". George Washington University. The Historical Journal, 41, I (1998) pp. 121–149
- Skidmore, Chris, Edward VI, London 2007, p. 148
- Tytler, Patrick, 'England under the Reigns of Edward VI and Mary', London, 1839

Government offices
Preceded by William Paget	Clerk of the Privy Council; 1543–1550; With: John Mason (1543–1545); Thomas Chaloner (1545–1550); Thomas Smith (1547–1548); Armagil Wade (1548–1550)	Succeeded by Thomas Chaloner; Armagil Wade; William Thomas
