= Thomas Smith (diplomat) =

English scholar and diplomat (1513–1577)

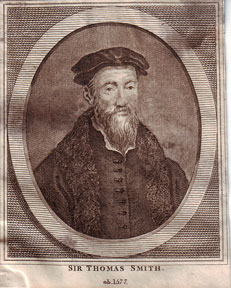
A c. 19th-century line engraving of Sir Thomas Smith.

Sir Thomas Smith (23 December 1513 – 12 August 1577) was an English scholar, parliamentarian and diplomat.

== Early life ==
Born at Saffron Walden in Essex, Smith was the second son of John Smith of Walden by Agnes, daughter of John Charnock of Lancashire. The Smiths of Essex are said to be descendants of Sir Roger de Clarendon, an illegitimate son of the Black Prince. He was educated at Queens' College, Cambridge, where he became a Fellow in 1530, and, in 1533, was appointed a public reader or professor. He lectured in the schools on natural philosophy, and on Greek in his own College. In 1540, Smith went abroad, and, after studying in France and Italy and taking a degree in law at the University of Padua, he returned to Cambridge in 1542.

He took the lead in the reform of the pronunciation of Greek, his views being universally adopted after considerable controversy. He and his friend, Sir John Cheke, were the great classical scholars of the time in England. In January 1543/44 he was appointed the first Regius Professor of Civil Law. He was vice-chancellor of the university the same year. In 1547, he became Provost of Eton College and Dean of Carlisle Cathedral.

Sir Thomas was an early convert to Protestantism, which brought him into prominence when Edward VI came to the throne. During the protectorate of Edward Seymour, 1st Duke of Somerset, he entered public life and was made the Secretary of State, and was sent on an important diplomatic mission to Brussels. In 1548, he was knighted. On the accession of Queen Mary I he lost all his offices, but in the reign of her sister, Elizabeth I, he was prominently employed in public affairs.

He was returned as Member of Parliament for Liverpool in 1559. It became clear that he supported the religious settlement and Confessions of Westminster (1560), sitting on two committees of Inquiry. When an expert handler of the son of the King of Sweden visiting Westminster, he was sent in 1562 as ambassador to France as an emerging diplomatic talent; he remained in France from September 1562 with experienced envoy Sir Nicholas Throckmorton.

Smith came to dagger blows with Throckmorton over character and policy differences. He returned from France in disgrace after suffering illness in April 1566. Nonetheless, Smith remained one of Elizabeth's most trusted Protestant counsellors. He had long been a friend of Sir William Cecil. Ennobled as Lord Burghley, Cecil appointed Smith to the Privy Council, only a month before he was elected to Commons as a knight of the shire for Essex. Smith, a prime mover behind the Conformity Bills, sought to restrain extremism and secure a subsidy from his fellow members. But when he proposed that the bishops be consulted, the puritan William Fleetwood defeated his motion. As a Privy Councillor he was influential on a number of committees. He spoke on the Treason Bill on the floor of the house, and examined witnesses to the Catholic plot led by the Duke of Norfolk. He was noted as upholding a religious objection to torture. His outstanding work elevated him to the higher ministerial echelons: in 1572 he was appointed Chancellor of the Order of the Garter and in July, principal secretary.

In 1572, Smith again went to France as an ambassador for a short time, and attended the receptions held at the arrival of Lord Clinton. Smith, Clinton, and Francis Walsingham had an audience with Catherine de' Medici at the Madrid Palace (while she was in bed) and Charles IX of France showed them her gardens and banqueting pavilion at the Tuileries Palace.

== Failed colony in Ireland ==
In 1571, Elizabeth I granted Smith 360,000 acres (150,000 ha) of East Ulster. The lands were to be used to plant English settlers in an effort to control areas claimed by Clandeboye O'Neill territory and thus control the native Irish. The grant included all of the area known today as North Down and the Ards, apart from the southern tip of the Ards peninsula which was controlled by the Anglo-Norman Savage family.

Unfortunately for Smith, the booklet he printed to advertise his new lands was read by the Clandeboye O'Neill chief, Sir Brian MacPhelim, who just a few years earlier had been knighted by Elizabeth. Furious at what he saw as her "duplicity" in secretly arranging for the colonisation of unsettled areas claimed by O'Neill, he burned down all the major buildings in the area. The owners objected, but could do nothing. This made it difficult for the plantation to take hold. Then launching a wave of attacks on these early English settlers when they arrived, the O'Neills scorched the land Smith was to develop, burning abbeys, monasteries and churches, and leaving Clandeboye "totally waste and void of inhabitants".

Smith, who was also a Member of Parliament for Essex in 1571 and 1572, died on 12 August 1577 at Hill Hall in Essex.

== Marriages and heirs ==
Smith married twice. First he wed Elizabeth Carkeke, daughter of a London printer, April 15, 1548; she died in 1553. His second marriage, which took place July 23, 1554, was to Philippa Wilford, the widow of Sir John Hampden of Great Hampden, Buckinghamshire, and the daughter of the London merchant Henry Wilford. She died 15 June 1578.

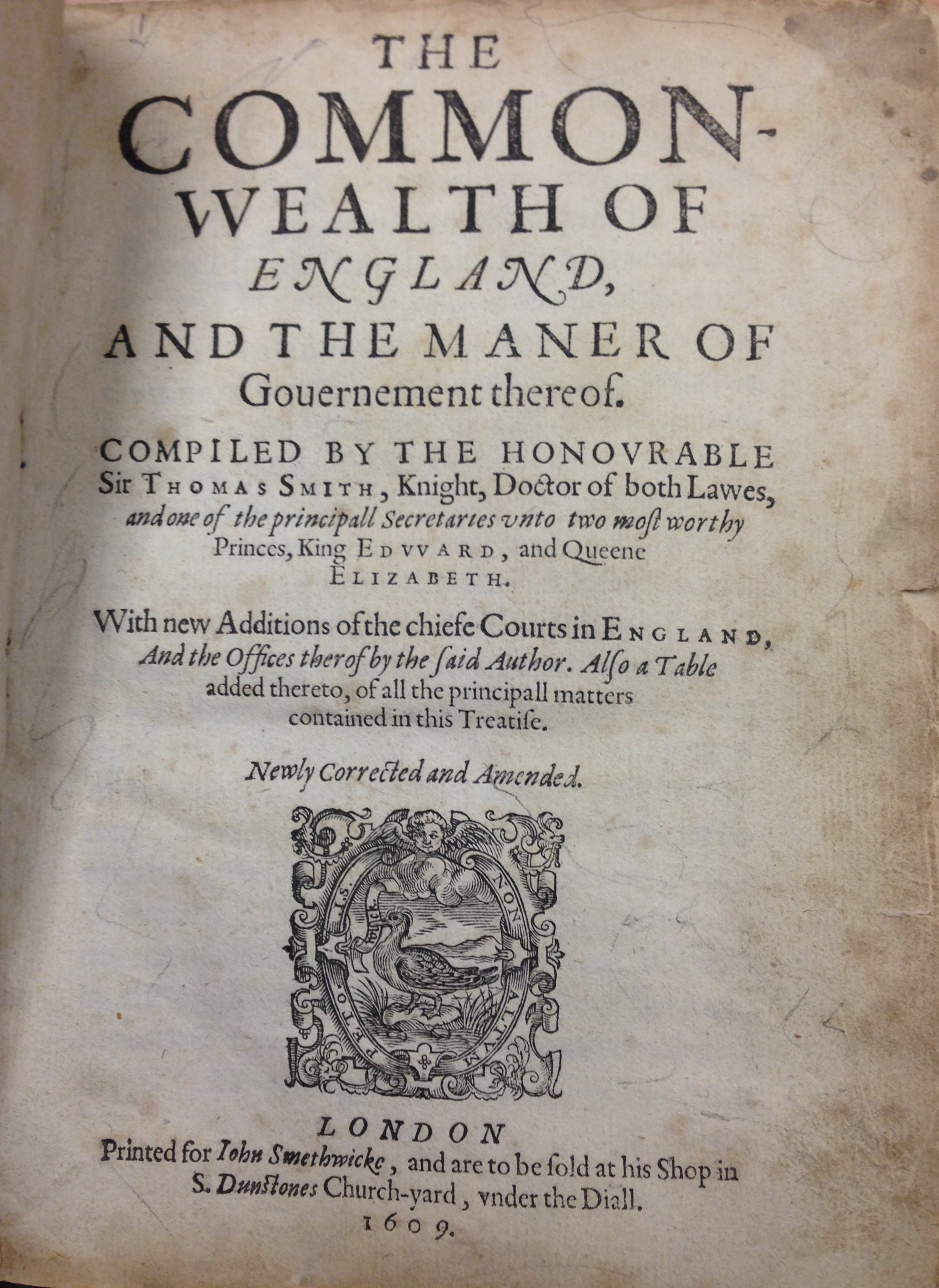
The title page of the 1609 edition of Smith's work

Smith had no issue by either marriage, although he had one illegitimate son named Thomas, who was killed during the failed Ards settlement. His heirs were his younger brother, George, and George's son, Sir William Smith (died 12 December 1626) of Theydon Mount, Essex. Sir William Smith's daughter, Frances Smith, married Sir Matthew Brend, owner of the land on which the first and second Globe Theatres were built. Edward de Vere, 17th Earl of Oxford, was brought up in Smith's house and his early education was supervised by him.

Smith left his books to Queens' College, Cambridge, except a few volumes that he had given to rector of Theydon Mount. He made provision for finishing the building of Hill Hall in his will, and a monument for himself and his wife (designed by Richard Kyrbie). Lady Phillipa Smith's will details some of the furnishings of Hill Hall.

== Works ==
Sir Thomas Smith's book De Republica Anglorum: the Maner of Gouernement or Policie of the Realme of England, written between 1562 and 1565, was first published in 1583. In it, he described England as a mixed government and a commonwealth, and stated that all commonwealths are of mixed character.

Smith also authored De recta & emendata lingvæ Anglicæ scriptione, dialogus (Correct and Improved English Writing, a Dialogue, 1568).

== Bibliography ==
- Armitage, David (2000), The Ideological Origins of the British Empire, p. 238.
- Berry, Herbert (1987), Shakespeare's Playhouses, New York: AMS Press, pp. 82–8.
- Collins, Arthur (1741), The English Baronetage, vol. III, Part I, London: Thomas Wotton, p. 344.
- Dewar, Mary (1964), Sir Thomas Smith; A Tudor Intellectual in Office, London: The Athlone Press.
- Richardson, Douglas (2011), Everingham, Kimball G. (ed.), Magna Carta Ancestry: A Study in Colonial and Medieval Families, vol. II (2nd ed.), Salt Lake City, ISBN 978-1449966386.

Attribution:

Government offices
Preceded by William Honnyng; Sir Thomas Chaloner	Clerk of the Privy Council; 1547–1548; With: William Honnyng; Sir Thomas Chaloner	Succeeded by William Honnyng; Sir Thomas Chaloner; Armagil Wade
Political offices
Preceded by Sir William Paget; Sir William Petre	Secretary of State; 1548–1549; With: Sir William Petre	Succeeded by Nicholas Wotton; Sir William Petre
Preceded by Sir William Cecil	Secretary of State; 1572–1576; With: Sir Francis Walsingham 1573–1576	Succeeded by Sir Francis Walsingham
Preceded by The Lord Howard of Effingham	Lord Privy Seal; 1573–1576	Succeeded by Sir Francis Walsingham
Church of England titles
Preceded by Lancelot Salkeld	Dean of Carlisle; 1560 – 1577	Succeeded by John Wolley
Preceded by Lancelot Salkeld	Dean of Carlisle; 1548 – 1554	Succeeded by Lancelot Salkeld
