= Godfrey Agnew =

British civil servant (1913–1995)

Sir Godfrey Agnew KCVO CB
- Agnew in 1953.
- Born: William Godfrey Agnew; 11 October 1913; Tunbridge Wells, Kent, England
- Died: 10 December 1995 (aged 82); Bracknell, Berkshire, England
- Occupation: Civil Servant
- Known for: Clerk of the Privy Council

Sir William Godfrey Agnew KCVO CB (11 October 1913 – 10 December 1995) was a British civil servant.

Agnew was born as William Charles Agnew in Kent on 11 October 1913 and was educated at Tonbridge School. In 1936 he became a solicitor in the Public Trustee's office, he joined the Royal Artillery at the start of the Second World War, he received a bad back injury caused by a bad landing during parachute training.

Agnew worked as Senior Clerk of the Privy Council Office from 1946 to 1951, before serving as Deputy Clerk until 1953. He was Clerk of the Privy Council from 1953 to 1974, and was made Knight Commander of the Royal Victorian Order in 1965. Between 1972 and 1974 he was Deputy Secretary at the Cabinet Office, and Agnew was made Companion of the Order of the Bath in 1975.

He married firstly Ruth Moore, with whom he had three sons and three daughters. After her death in 1962, Agnew married secondly Lady (Nancy) Tyrwhitt.

Government offices
Preceded by Major Francis Ford Fernau	Clerk of the Privy Council; 1953–1974	Succeeded by Sir Neville Leigh
