= Lancelot Salkeld =

Dean of Carlisle

Lancelot Salkeld (1475 – 1560) was the last Prior and then first Dean of Carlisle.

Salkeld was appointed by the king in foundation charter on 8 May 1541 and then deprived on 1 January 1548. On 29 August 1554 he was presented by the king and queen, subscribed as dean to royal supremacy and the Articles on 3 October 1559; and then deprived again in 1560 to allow the restoration of Thomas Smith, also for the second time. His screen can still be seen at Carlisle Cathedral.

Church of England titles
New title	Dean of Carlisle; 1542 – 1547	Succeeded by Thomas Smith
Preceded by Thomas Smith	Dean of Carlisle; 1554 – 1560	Succeeded by Thomas Smith
