= Richard Hore =

English explorer

Richard Hore (fl. 1536) was an English explorer who conducted an early voyage to the coast of what is now Newfoundland, where his passengers allegedly engaged in cannibalism in order to survive. His travels are attested in the writings of Richard Hakluyt, who documented the ill-fated expedition. Apart from his famous journey and its immediate aftermath, little is known about the life of Richard Hore.

== In Hakluyt's Principal Navigations ==
One of the few contemporary accounts of Richard Hore's life is contained in The Principal Navigations, Voyages, Traffiques and Discoveries of the English Nation, a late 16th century history by Richard Hakluyt. Master Hore, described as "a man of goodly stature and of great courage" who was "given to the studie of Cosmographie," succeeded in attracting a number of gentlemen interested in visiting the North American coast. According to Hakluyt, the expedition was to set out on two ships: the Trinity, captained by Hore himself, and the Minion, upon which sailed men such as Armigil Wade. Hakluyt derived his narrative from two sources: the testimony of Thomas Butts, son of William Butts, and Oliver Dawbeny. Dawbeny, who sailed on the Minion, had been interviewed by Hakluyt's cousin, Richard Hakluyt of the Middle Temple, while Thomas Butts, who had sailed on the Trinity, was very old when he was interviewed personally by Hakluyt as the last surviving witness to the voyage.

After embarking from Gravesend in April 1536, the ships sailed for two months without sighting land until they approached Cape Breton, where they turned northeast until they reached the Island of Penguin. There the passengers killed and ate a large number of native birds as well as several bears. According to Oliver Dawbeny, at this point the English encountered some indigenous persons in a canoe, who fled and could not be located afterwards. This was likely an encounter with the Beothuk, although the possibility remains that Hore's crew had encountered the Inuit.

Following this incident, the expedition began to experience serious shortage of supplies, to the point where Dawbeny relates that a man was killed and partially eaten by one of his companions. When news of this was brought to the captain, he vigorously harangued the crew on their actions before beginning to "exhort [them] to repentance, and besought all the company to pray, that it might please God to looke upon their miserable present state, and for his owne mercie to relieve the same." Despite the denunciation of cannibalism, soon after the crew prepared to draw lots to determine which of them should be sacrificed for the survival of the rest. The unexpected arrival of a well-supplied French ship prevented this from occurring, as the English seized the French ship and left its crew to fend for themselves.

The return voyage passed far enough northward for the expedition to witness large icebergs in the summer months, and arrived in St. Ives, Cornwall in October 1536. They stayed for a time at the home of John Luttrell before returning home to London, where Thomas Butts was described as being so emaciated that he would not have been recognized by his parents if it were not for an identifying wart on his knee. Some time after their return, the French ship that had been attacked by the expedition arrived in England and made a petition of grievance to King Henry VIII, who was so moved by pity for his subjects that he spared them punishment but personally repaid the wronged Frenchmen in full from his own coffers.

== Critical scholarship ==
Richard Hakluyt's account of the voyage of Richard Hore has been closely scrutinized by skeptical historians. E. G. R. Taylor discovered court records of a lawsuit brought against Hore by the merchant William Dolphyn, who was seeking redress for breach of contract and whose ship had been chartered for the voyage by Hore. The lawsuit, which makes no mention of undue hardships, identifies Hore's second ship as the William of London and not Minion, a probable error on Hakluyt's part. Later documents on Richard Hore detailed further legal troubles, as he had gained control of a ship called the Valentine in 1537 and within the next year was investigated for allegedly kidnapping some Portuguese subjects and then was found to be in debt to one Sir Thomas Spent. Few primary sources related to Richard Hore are extant; the memoirs written by Armigil Wade have evidently been lost.

Other inquiries have called into question whether any of the ship's company actually resorted to the eating of human flesh. Philip Levy theorizes that the misidentification of Hore's ship William as the Minion may have been a deliberate or accidental reference to another ship called Minion whose crew had endured hunger in 1568 while in the Gulf of Mexico. Further, the incident of man-eating which was related from Dawbeny's testimony must be seen as problematic, given the confusion in Hakluyt's narrative over which of his two sources witnessed each anecdote. Levy suggests that because the actual cannibalistic moment was not directly witnessed, it could be seen as merely a veiled threat from a sailor who had been caught eating some other kind of meat.

In 2021, Joshua Ivinson presented a more radical interpretation, based on a close reading of the relevant High Court of Admiralty files. He argues that Hore's only certain voyage to Newfoundland took place in 1535. This was followed by an independent fishing voyage that took place in 1536, led by some of Hore's former associates.
