= Thomas Chaloner (statesman) =

English Statesman and Poet

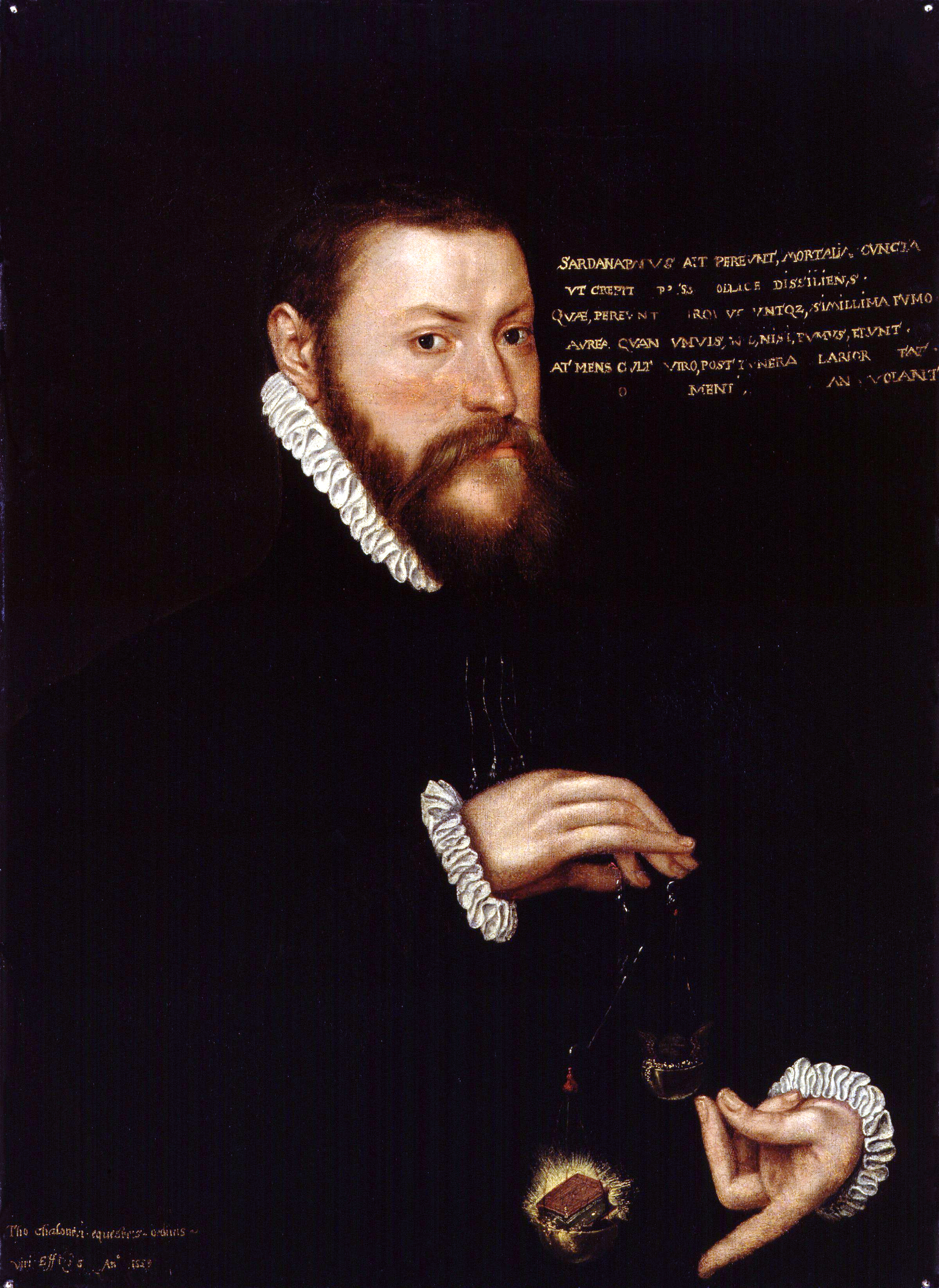
Sir Thomas Chaloner

Sir Thomas Chaloner (1521 – 14 October 1565) was an English statesman and poet.

== Life ==
Thomas Chaloner was born in 1521 to Margaret Myddleton (c. 1490–1534) and Roger Challoner (c. 1490–1550), a descendant of the Denbighshire Chaloners. His father was a London silk merchant who lived at St Mary-at-Hill Street, Billingsgate. A courtier, Roger was a Gentleman-Usher of the Privy Chamber to King Henry VIII, a Teller of the Receipt of the Exchequer, and a Freeman of the City of London through the Worshipful Company of Mercers. Roger died in 1550 and was buried in the main body of the Church of St Dunstan-in-the-East. Sir Thomas's two brothers, Francis and John Challoner settled in Ireland where John became a prominent politician and administrator.

No details are known of Thomas Chaloner's youth except that he was educated at both Oxford and Cambridge (likely St John's College).

In 1540 he went, as secretary to Sir Henry Knyvett, to the court of Charles V, whom he accompanied in his expedition against Algiers in 1541, and was wrecked on the Barbary coast. In 1547 he joined in the expedition to Scotland, and was knighted, after the battle of Pinkie near Musselburgh, by the protector Somerset, whose patronage he enjoyed. In 1549 he was a witness against Edmund Bonner, bishop of London; in 1551 against Stephen Gardiner, bishop of Winchester; in the spring of the latter year he was sent as a commissioner to Scotland to conclude the Treaty of Norham, and again in March 1552. In 1553 he went with Sir Nicholas Wotton and Sir William Pickering on an embassy to France, but was recalled by Queen Mary on her accession.

In spite of his Protestant views, Chaloner was still employed by the government, going to Scotland as ambassador in February 1556. He brought Mary's response to Archibald Campbell, Lord Lorne's military activities in Ireland. During the war with France, 1557–1558, Chaloner provided carriages for troops. In 1558 he went as Elizabeth's ambassador to the Emperor Ferdinand at Cambrai, from July 1559 to February 1559/60 he was ambassador to Philip II of Spain at Brussels. Chaloner bought books for William Cecil in Antwerp including an illustrated work on architecture which he suggested might be useful for Burghley House at Stamford.

In 1561 he was ambassador to Spain. His letters are full of complaints of his treatment there, but it was not till 1564, when in failing health, that he was allowed to return home. He died at his house in Clerkenwell on 14 October 1565.

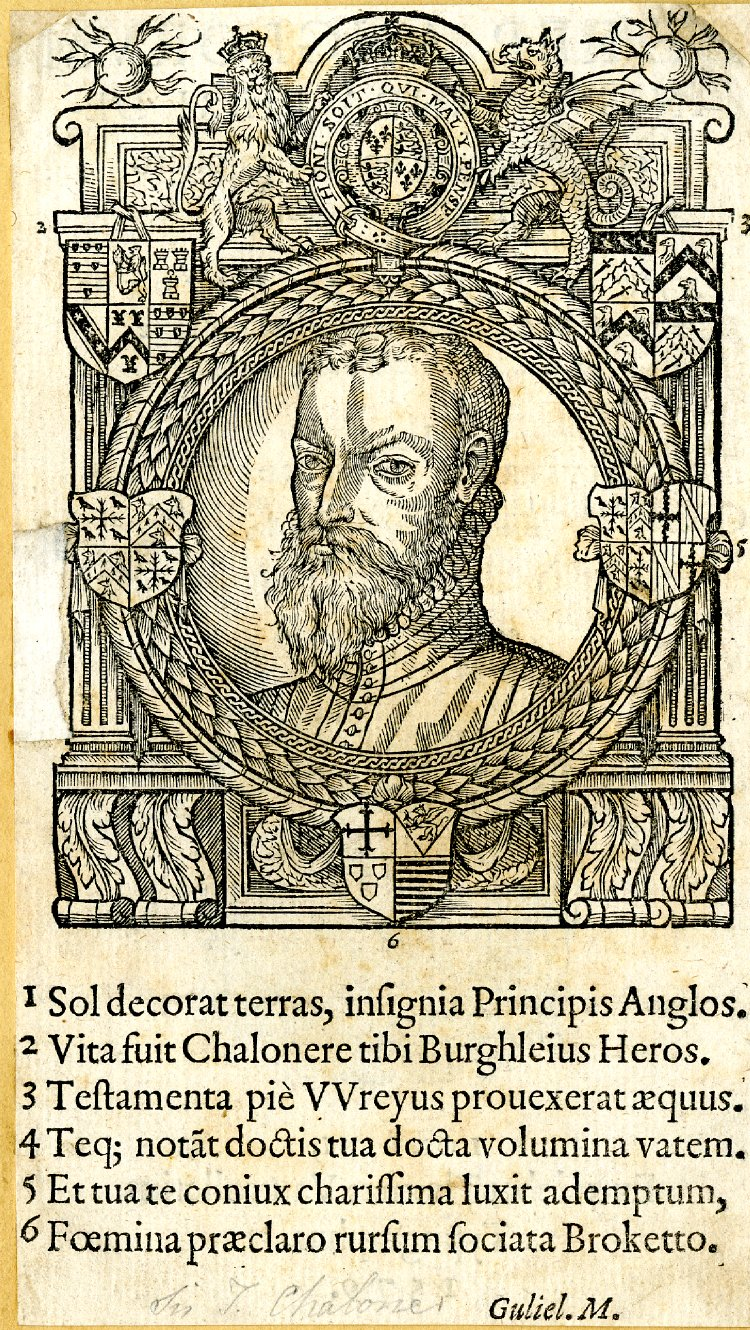
Woodcut portrait of Sir Thomas Chaloner, frontispiece to his 1579 De Rep. Anglorum instauranda libri decem.

He acquired during his years of service three estates, Guisborough in Yorkshire, Steeple Claydon in Buckinghamshire, and St Bees in Cumberland. He married (I) Joan, widow of Sir Thomas Leigh; and (2) Audrey, daughter of Edward Frodsham, of Elton, Cheshire, by whom he had one son, Sir Thomas Chaloner (1559–1615). Chaloner was the intimate of most of the learned men of his day, and with Lord Burghley he had a lifelong friendship.

Throughout his busy official life he occupied himself with literature, his Latin verses and his pastoral poems being much admired by his contemporaries. Chaloner wrote the tragedy of Richard II for William Baldwin's Mirror for Magistrates, first published in 1559. His most important work, De Rep. Anglorum instauranda libri decem, written while he was in Spain, was first published by William Malim (1579, 3 pts.), with complimentary Latin verses in praise of the author by Burghley and others. Chaloner's epigrams and epitaphs were also added to the volume, as well as in laudem Henrici octavi ... carmen Panegericum, first printed in 1560.

Amongst his other works are The praise of folie, Moriae encomium ... by Erasmus ... Englished by Sir Thomas Chaloner, Knight (1549, ed. Janet E. Ashbee, 1901); A book of the Office of Servantes (1543), translated from Gilbert Cousin (Gilbertus Cognatus); and An homilie of Saint John Chrysostome ... Englished by T. C. (1544).

In 1598 Chaloner is mentioned in Francis Meres' Palladis Tamia as a pastoral poet: "As Theocritus in Greeke, Virgil and Mantuan in Latine, Sanazar in Italian, and the Authour of Amyntae Gaudia and Walsinghams Melibaeus are the best for pastorall: so amongst us the best in this kind are Sir Philip Sidney, master Challener, Spencer, Stephen Gosson, Abraham Fraunce and Barnefield." Palladis Tamia is important in English literary history as the first critical account of the poems and early plays of William Shakespeare.

Government offices
Preceded by John Mason; William Honnyng	Clerk of the Privy Council; 1545–1552; With: William Honnyng (1545–1550); William Thomas (1550–1552); Thomas Smith (1547–1548); Armagil Wade (1548–1552); Bernard Hampton (1551–1552)	Succeeded by William Thomas; Armagil Wade; Bernard Hampton
