= Geoffrey de Deney =

British civil servant (1931–2015)

Sir Geoffrey Ivor de Deney KCVO (8 October 1931 – 19 November 2015) was a British civil servant.

He was educated at St Edmund Hall, Oxford, and then carried out National Service as an officer in the North Staffordshire Regiment. He subsequently joined the Civil Service. After a career in the Home Office, he served as Clerk of the Privy Council between 1984 and 1992. He was made Knight Commander of the Royal Victorian Order in the 1992 Birthday Honours. In 1990, he was awarded the New Zealand 1990 Commemoration Medal.

After retirement from the Civil Service in 1992 he worked as the first Chief Executive of the Royal College of Anaesthetists.

Government offices
Preceded by Sir Neville Leigh	Clerk of the Privy Council; 1984–1992	Succeeded by Sir Nigel Nicholls
