= William Butts =

Physician to King Henry VIII of England and his extended court

Sir William Butts
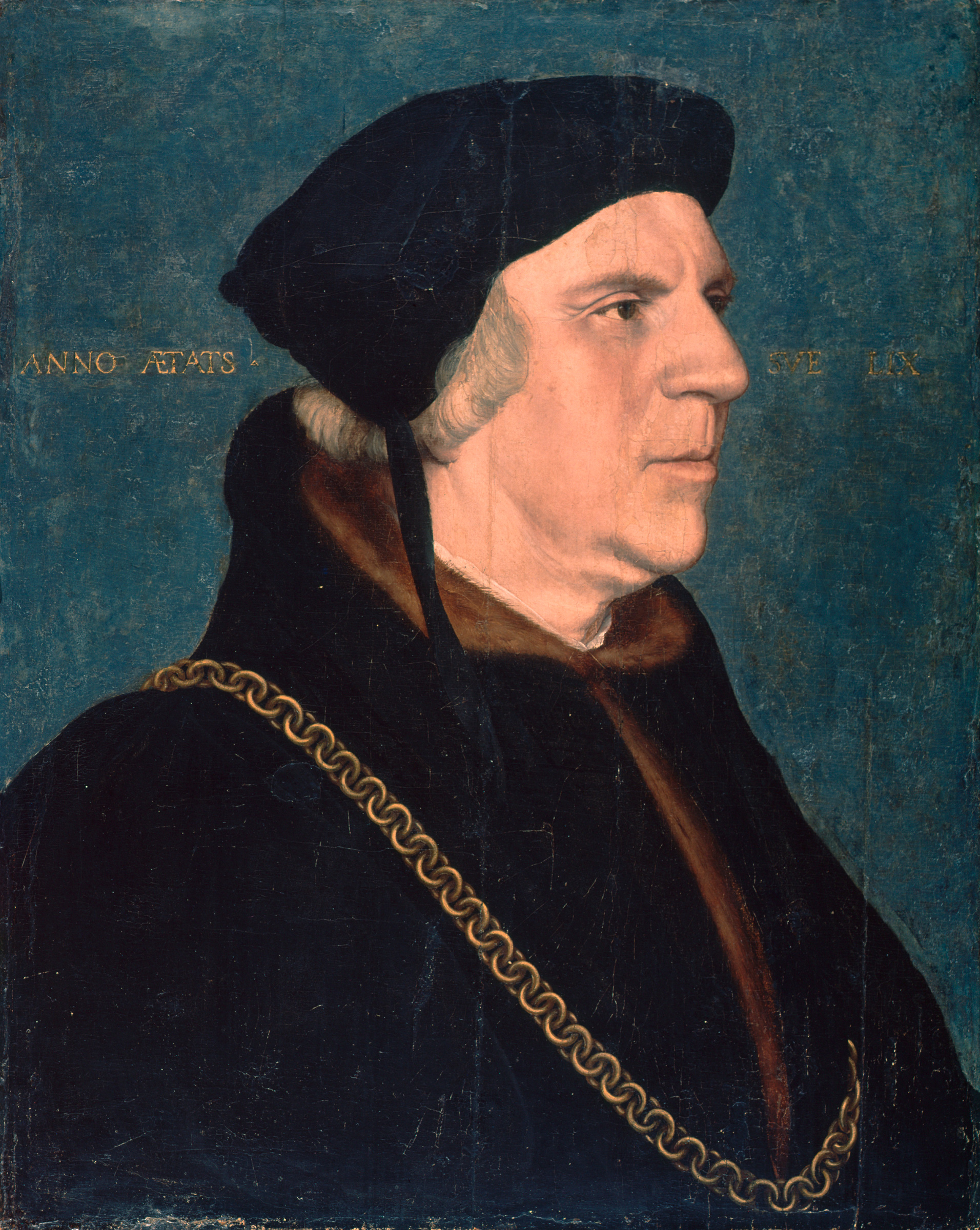
- Portrait of Butts by Hans Holbein the Younger (c. 1543)
- Born: c. 1486; Norwich, Norfolk, England
- Died: 22 November 1545 (aged 58–59); Fulham Palace, Middlesex, England
- Education: Gonville Hall, Cambridge
- Spouse: Lady Margaret Butts
- Children: 3

Sir William Butts (c. 1486 – 22 November 1545) was a member of King Henry VIII of England's court and was the King's physician.

His portrait was painted by Hans Holbein the Younger in 1543, and he was knighted in the following year. His granddaughter Anne was married to the son of Sir Nicholas Bacon, Lord Keeper.

== Career ==
Butts was born around 1486 in Norwich, Norfolk to John Butts, auditor of the Crown Revenues and later a Custodian of Wards, and Elizabeth Butts. Educated at Gonville Hall, Cambridge (present-day Gonville and Caius College), he graduated with his Bachelor's in 1507. (Note: Also cited as 1506.) Awarded his Master's in 1509, Butts later achieved his medical degree in 1518. He was admitted a Member of the College of Physicians in 1529. He worked with George Owen and Thomas Wendy.

== Religion ==
Sir William Butts played an important role in King Henry's relations with Thomas Wolsey, while the Cardinal lay sick at Esher in 1529/30. He was a known Protestant and close associate of Thomas Cranmer, Archbishop of Canterbury, and of Catherine Parr, the sixth wife of Henry VIII. His family later became significant leaders of the Puritan faction in Norfolk.

He died on 22 November 1545 at Fulham Palace, Middlesex (present-day London). The Fulham historian Faulkner identified Butts's original monument as an altar-tomb or tomb-chest of English marble against the south wall of the chancel of All Saints Church, Fulham, on which was his brass effigy in armour as a knight, with a brass scroll on one side inscribed "Myn Advantage". His arms were shown at each corner of the stone, "Azure 3 lozenges gules, on a chevron or, between 3 etoils or".

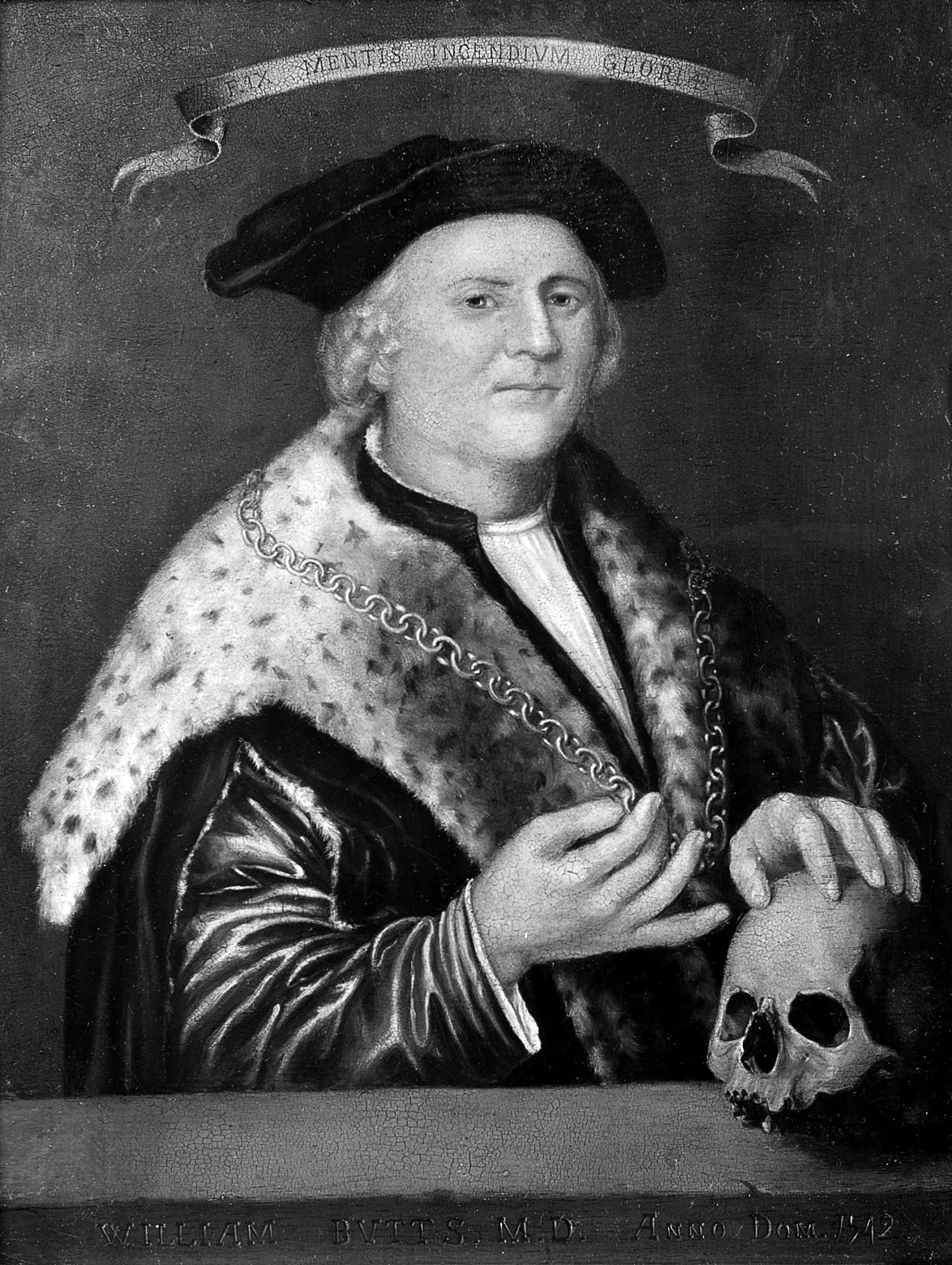
William Butts with a Memento Mori

His epitaph in Latin verse, conceived by John Strype to have been composed for Butts by his dear friend Sir John Cheke, was at first mounted on the wall of the church, but had become so worn out by 1627 that it was restored by Leonard Butts, Esq., of Norfolk. It contains six lines of elegiac Latin:

Latin

Quid medicina valet, quid Honos, quid gratia Regum:
Quid popularij Amor, mors ubi saeva venit?
Sola valet PIETAS, quae structa est auspice Christo:
Sola in morte valet, caetera cuncta fluunt:
Ergo mihi vitâ fuerit quando omnia Christus,
Mors mihi nunc lucrum vitaque Christus erit.

—
Translation:
English

What helpe be Physick, Honours, what the Thanks of Kings,
What help the Peoples Love, when cruel Death shall come?
PIETY vaileth alone, in Christ propitious made:
This onlie stands in death, all else doth flie away:
So then since Christ in Life was all in all to me,
So Death to me my gain and Christ my life shall be.

== Family ==
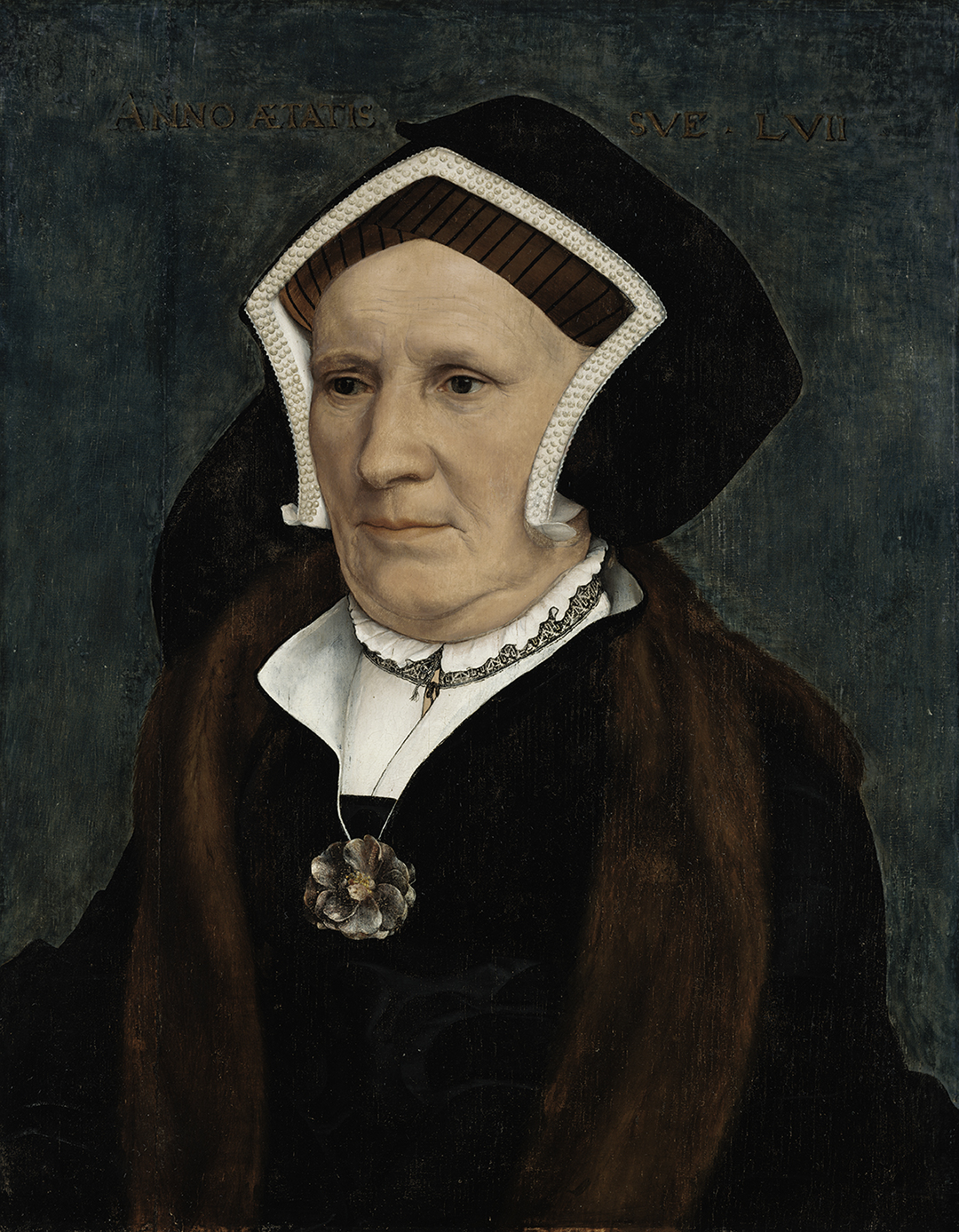
Margaret Butts, portrait by Hans Holbein the Younger

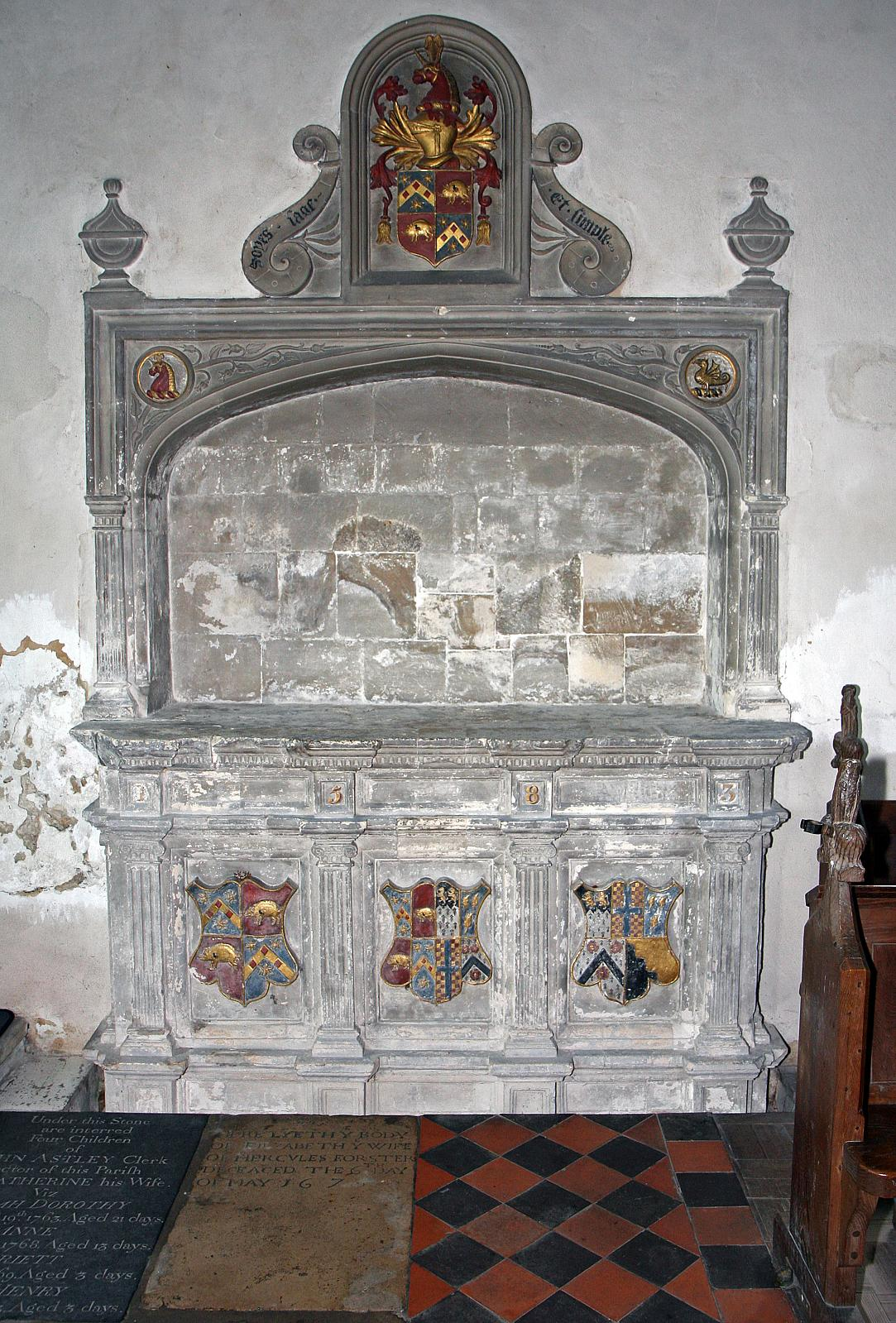
Tomb of Sir William Butts the younger, at Thornage (1583)

Sir William Butts married Margaret Bacon of Cambridgeshire.

They had three children,

- (Sir) William Butts of Thornage, Norfolk (c1506 - 1583) (m. Joan Bures). Butts was a patron of literature. After his death a collection of poems, A Book of Epitaphes (1583) was published in his memory by Robert Dallington. He is also the subject of a notable portrait by Holbein. His tomb at Thornage has (above) a heraldic quartering for Butts with Bacon, shown also on the tomb-chest, dexter: for his wife, sinister, is a quartering for Bures, "Per chevron indented sable and ermine, in chief two lions rampant or". The central blazon on the tomb chest is the impalement of Butts with Bures.
- Thomas Butts of Great Ryburgh, Norfolk (m. Bridget Bures), of Corpus Christi College, Cambridge, who participated in the 1536 voyage of Richard Hore to Newfoundland, and survived to tell the story to Richard Hakluyt. He died in 1592 and was commemorated in funeral verses. His copious heraldic cycle at Great Ryburgh survives in glass, church plate and stone, and was studied by the antiquary Thomas Martin of Palgrave.
- Edmund Butts of Barrow, Suffolk (m. Anne Bures). They had been seven years married when he died in 1548: he was buried at Barrow, and Anne survived him as a widow for 61 years, dying in December 1609. She is buried with a fine monumental brass effigy with verses and a fillet inscription set in black marble in the church at Redgrave, Suffolk. Their daughter Anne Butts married Sir Nicholas Bacon, 1st Baronet, of Redgrave (c. 1540–1624).

The three wives were sisters, the daughters of Sir Henry Bures (died 1528) of Acton, Suffolk, and his wife Anne, daughter of George Waldegrave and Anne Drury. Their mother remarried c. 1528 to (Sir) Clement Heigham (died 1571), whose stepdaughters they became.
