= Alex Galloway =

British former civil servant (born 1952)

Alexander Kippen Galloway CVO (born 29 April 1952) is a British former civil servant.

Galloway was educated at Birkenhead School, Jesus College, Oxford and the Open University. He served in the Department of the Environment, eventually as Assistant Secretary, between 1974 and 1998. In 1998 he became Clerk of the Privy Council, serving in the position until 2006. That year he was made Commander of the Royal Victorian Order.

After leaving the Civil Service in 2006, he worked as the Clerk of the Worshipful Company of Glaziers and Painters of Glass until 2012. He has also worked as Chief Executive of the Society for the Environment and as a council member of the Institute of Directors.

Government offices
Preceded by Robert Bulling (acting)	Clerk of the Privy Council; 1998–2006	Succeeded by Judith Simpson
