= Neville Leigh =

British civil servant

Sir Neville Leigh KCVO

Clerk to the Privy Council
- In office 1974–1984
- Monarch: Elizabeth II
- Prime Minister: Edward Heath; Harold Wilson; James Callaghan; Margaret Thatcher
- Preceded by: Godfrey Agnew
- Succeeded by: Geoffrey de Deney

Personal details
- Born: Neville Egerton Leigh; 4 June 1922
- Died: 1 August 1994 (aged 72)
- Spouse: Denise Branch (m. 1944)
- Children: 3, including Edward
- Education: Charterhouse School
- Occupation: Civil Servant

Military service
- Allegiance: United Kingdom
- Branch/service: Royal Air Force
- Unit: RAF Intelligence
- Battles/wars: Second World War

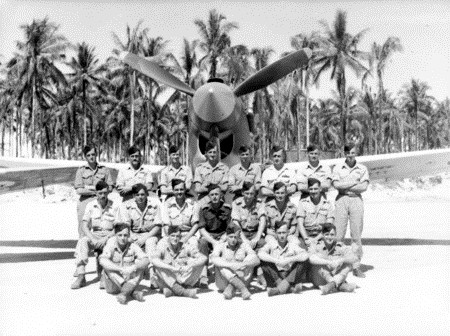
Los Negros, Admiralty Islands, New Guinea. 28 May 1944

Sir Neville Egerton Leigh KCVO (4 June 1922 – 1 August 1994) was a senior British civil servant, descended from a Cheshire gentry family of medieval origin.

== Life ==
The younger son of Captain Cecil Egerton Leigh and Gladys Durell Barnes, Neville Leigh was educated at Charterhouse School.

Commissioned in the Royal Air Force during the Second World War, from 1951 Leigh served in the RAF Intelligence. He was appointed Commander of the Royal Victorian Order in the 1967 Birthday Honours.

Leigh served as Clerk to the Privy Council between 1974 and 1984, and was promoted Knight Commander of the Royal Victorian Order in the 1980 Birthday Honours.

Leigh married Denise Branch, daughter of Colonel Cyril Denzil Branch MC, on 20 May 1944; they had a daughter and two sons, the younger being the Conservative MP Sir Edward Leigh.

== See also ==
- Burke's Landed Gentry
- High Legh

Government offices
Preceded by Sir Godfrey Agnew	Clerk to the Privy Council; 1974–1984	Succeeded by Sir Geoffrey de Deney
