= Clerk of the Privy Council (United Kingdom) =

Senior British civil service post

- Arms used by the Privy Council Office
- Incumbent; Richard Tilbrook since 2012
- Privy Council
- Term length: At His Majesty's pleasure
- Inaugural holder: William Paget
- Formation: 1540

The Clerk of the Privy Council is a senior civil servant in His Majesty's Government in the United Kingdom, being Head of the Privy Council Office.

This historic office is less powerful now than it once was and than its Canadian equivalent, whose holder serves ex officio as Head of the Canadian Civil Service, whereas this role in the UK Civil Service has, since 2014, been given to the Cabinet Secretary as the Head of HM Civil Service.

Until 1859 there were multiple — usually four — clerks of the Privy Council. Three of the four positions then extant were progressively abolished in the 19th century until only one remained in 1859. The Clerk of the Privy Council is deputized by one or two Deputy Clerks, although the office of Senior Clerk has been established in the past.

== Clerks in Ordinary, 1540–1859 ==
Date	One	Two	Three	Four	Five	Six
10 August 1540	William Paget					
23 April 1543	John Mason	William Honnyng				
17 November 1545	vacant	William Honnyng				
18 December 1545	Sir Thomas Chaloner	William Honnyng				
March 1547	Sir Thomas Chaloner	William Honnyng	Thomas Smith			
10 May 1548	Sir Thomas Chaloner	William Honnyng	Armagil Wade			
20 May 1550	Sir Thomas Chaloner	William Thomas	Armagil Wade			
24 September 1551	Sir Thomas Chaloner	William Thomas	Armagil Wade	Bernard Hampton		
12 May 1552	vacant	William Thomas	Armagil Wade	Bernard Hampton		
By 31 March 1553	vacant	vacant	Armagil Wade	Bernard Hampton		
19 July 1553	vacant	vacant	vacant	Bernard Hampton		
30 July 1553	Sir Francis Allen	William Smith	vacant	Bernard Hampton		
After 23 December 1566	Sir Francis Allen	vacant	vacant	Bernard Hampton		
1570	vacant	vacant	vacant	Bernard Hampton		
29 April 1571	Edmund Tremayne	vacant	vacant	Bernard Hampton		
1572	Edmund Tremayne	vacant	vacant	vacant		
6 July 1572	Edmund Tremayne	vacant	vacant	Robert Beale		
18 July 1576	Edmund Tremayne	Sir Thomas Wilkes	Henry Cheke	Robert Beale		
After 5 September 1581	Edmund Tremayne	Sir Thomas Wilkes	vacant	Robert Beale		
September 1582	vacant	Sir Thomas Wilkes	vacant	Robert Beale		
7 October 1584	Sir William Wade	Sir Thomas Wilkes	vacant	Robert Beale		
19 March 1587	Sir William Wade	Sir Thomas Wilkes	Sir Anthony Ashley	Robert Beale		
2 March 1598	Sir William Wade	vacant	Sir Anthony Ashley	Robert Beale		
21 April 1598	Sir William Wade	Sir Thomas Smith	Sir Anthony Ashley	Robert Beale		
27 May 1601	Sir William Wade	Sir Thomas Smith	Sir Anthony Ashley	vacant		
18 June 1601	Sir William Wade	Sir Thomas Smith	Sir Anthony Ashley	Sir Thomas Edmondes		
25 May 1608	Sir William Wade	Sir Thomas Smith	Sir Anthony Ashley	Sir Thomas Edmondes	Sir Ralph Winwood	Sir John Corbet
15 August 1609	Sir William Wade	Sir Thomas Smith	Sir Anthony Ashley	Sir Thomas Edmondes	vacant	Sir John Corbet
7 September 1609	Sir William Wade	Sir Thomas Smith	Sir Anthony Ashley	Sir Thomas Edmondes	Sir Clement Edmondes	Sir John Corbet
27 November 1609	Sir William Wade	vacant	Sir Anthony Ashley	Sir Thomas Edmondes	Sir Clement Edmondes	Sir John Corbet
By 31 May 1610	Sir William Wade	vacant	vacant	Sir Thomas Edmondes	Sir Clement Edmondes	Sir John Corbet
22 July 1610	Sir William Wade	vacant	Sir George Calvert	Sir Thomas Edmondes	Sir Clement Edmondes	Sir John Corbet
7 December 1611	Sir William Wade	vacant	Sir George Calvert	Sir Thomas Edmondes	Sir Clement Edmondes	vacant
23 August 1613	vacant	vacant	Sir George Calvert	Sir Thomas Edmondes	Sir Clement Edmondes	vacant
24 September 1613	Francis Cottington	vacant	Sir George Calvert	Sir Thomas Edmondes	Sir Clement Edmondes	vacant
24 February 1614	Francis Cottington	vacant	Sir George Calvert	William Trumbull	Sir Clement Edmondes	vacant
16 February 1619	Francis Cottington	vacant	vacant	William Trumbull	Sir Clement Edmondes	vacant
February 1619	Francis Cottington	vacant	Sir Albertus Morton	William Trumbull	Sir Clement Edmondes	vacant
13 October 1622	Francis Cottington	vacant	Sir Albertus Morton	William Trumbull	vacant	vacant
7 November 1622	Francis Cottington	vacant	Sir Albertus Morton	William Trumbull	John Dickenson	vacant
11 December 1622	Sir Thomas Meautys	vacant	Sir Albertus Morton	William Trumbull	John Dickenson	vacant
24 January 1623	Sir Thomas Meautys	vacant	Sir William Beecher	William Trumbull	John Dickenson	vacant
September 1635	Sir Thomas Meautys	vacant	Sir William Beecher	vacant	John Dickenson	vacant
9 October 1635	Sir Thomas Meautys	vacant	Sir William Beecher	Sir Edward Nicholas	John Dickenson	vacant
By 20 January 1636	Sir Thomas Meautys	vacant	Sir William Beecher	Sir Edward Nicholas	vacant	vacant
26 May 1636	Sir Thomas Meautys	vacant	Sir William Beecher	Sir Edward Nicholas	Sir Dudley Carleton	vacant
27 January 1641	Sir Thomas Meautys	vacant	Sir Richard Browne	Sir Edward Nicholas	Sir Dudley Carleton	vacant
27 November 1641	Sir Thomas Meautys	vacant	Sir Richard Browne	vacant	Sir Dudley Carleton	vacant
14 May 1649	Sir Edward Walker	vacant	vacant	vacant		
18 November 1656	Sir Edward Walker	Sir George Lane	vacant	vacant		
27 October 1658	Sir Edward Walker	Sir George Lane	Sir John Nicholas	vacant		
22 June 1660	Sir Edward Walker	Sir George Lane	Sir John Nicholas	Sir Richard Browne		
23 September 1664	Sir Edward Walker	Sir Robert Southwell	Sir John Nicholas	Sir Richard Browne		
24 January 1672	Sir Edward Walker	Sir Robert Southwell	Sir John Nicholas	Sir Joseph Williamson		
16 September 1674	Sir Edward Walker	Sir Robert Southwell	Sir John Nicholas	Sir Philip Lloyd		
21 February 1677	Sir Thomas Doleman	Sir Robert Southwell	Sir John Nicholas	Sir Philip Lloyd		
5 December 1679	Sir Thomas Doleman	Francis Gwyn	Sir John Nicholas	Sir Philip Lloyd		
16 January 1685	William Bridgeman	Sir Philip Musgrave	Sir John Nicholas	Sir Philip Lloyd		
6 February 1685	vacant	Sir Philip Musgrave	Sir John Nicholas	Sir Philip Lloyd		
22 October 1686	William Bridgeman	Sir Philip Musgrave	Sir John Nicholas	William Blathwayt		
11 December 1688	vacant	vacant	Sir John Nicholas	William Blathwayt		
21 February 1689	Charles Montagu	Richard Cooling	Sir John Nicholas	William Blathwayt		
24 March 1692	John Dyve	Richard Cooling	Sir John Nicholas	William Blathwayt		
12 January 1693	William Bridgeman	Richard Cooling	Sir John Nicholas	William Blathwayt		
27 July 1697	William Bridgeman	John Povey	Sir John Nicholas	William Blathwayt		
18 May 1699	Edward Southwell	John Povey	Sir John Nicholas	William Blathwayt		
11 January 1705	Edward Southwell	John Povey	Sir Christopher Musgrave	William Blathwayt		
2 November 1710	Edward Southwell	John Povey	Sir Christopher Musgrave	William Blathwayt		
12 May 1715	Edward Southwell	James Vernon	Sir Christopher Musgrave	William Blathwayt		
26 March 1716	Edward Southwell	James Vernon	Sir Robert Hales	William Blathwayt		
23 October 1717	Edward Southwell	James Vernon	Sir Robert Hales	Abraham Stanyan		
3 February 1720	Edward Southwell	James Vernon	Sir Robert Hales	Temple Stanyan		
22 May 1729	Edward Southwell	James Vernon	Sir Walter Carey	Temple Stanyan		
11 February 1731	William Sharpe	James Vernon	Sir Walter Carey	Temple Stanyan		
21 April 1752	William Sharpe	James Vernon	Sir Walter Carey	Gilbert West		
14 April 1756	William Sharpe	James Vernon	Sir Walter Carey	Henry Fane		
6 May 1756	William Sharpe	William Blair	Sir Walter Carey	Henry Fane		
19 May 1757	William Sharpe	William Blair	Francis Vernon	Henry Fane		
22 April 1762	William Sharpe	William Blair	Philip Sharpe	Henry Fane		
23 June 1764	William Sharpe	William Blair	Philip Sharpe	Robert Walpole		
11 September 1767	Sir Stephen Cotterell	William Blair	Philip Sharpe	Robert Walpole		
4 December 1772	Sir Stephen Cotterell	William Blair	Sir George Chetwynd	Robert Walpole		
1 January 1779	Sir Stephen Cotterell	William Fawkener	Sir George Chetwynd	Robert Walpole		
25 August 1786	Sir Stephen Cotterell	William Fawkener	Sir George Chetwynd	Robert Walpole	Grey Elliot	
June 1787	Sir Stephen Cotterell	William Fawkener	Sir George Chetwynd	Robert Walpole		
19 April 1810	Sir Stephen Cotterell	William Fawkener	Sir George Chetwynd	abolished		
8 August 1810	Richard Chetwynd, 5th Viscount Chetwynd	William Fawkener	Sir George Chetwynd	abolished		
19 August 1811	Richard Chetwynd, 5th Viscount Chetwynd	James Buller	Sir George Chetwynd	abolished		
20 March 1821	Charles Greville	James Buller	Sir George Chetwynd	abolished		
24 March 1824	Charles Greville	James Buller	abolished	abolished		
15 December 1830	Charles Greville	William Bathurst	abolished	abolished		
May 1859	abolished	William Bathurst	abolished	abolished		

== Clerks in Ordinary, 1859–present ==
- May 1859: William Bathurst
- June 1860: Sir Arthur Helps
- 17 March 1875: Sir Charles Lennox Peel
- 9 August 1898: Sir Almeric FitzRoy
- 31 May 1923: Sir Maurice Hankey
- 1 August 1938: Sir Rupert Howorth
- 1942: Sir Eric Leadbitter
- 30 June 1951: Major Francis Ford Fernau
- 1953: Sir Godfrey Agnew
- 1974: Sir Neville Leigh
- 1984: Sir Geoffrey de Deney
- 1992: Sir Nigel Nicholls
- 1996: Robert Bulling (acting)
- 1998: Alex Galloway
- 2007: Judith Simpson
- 2012: Richard Tilbrook

== See also ==
- Honours Committee
- Clerk of the Privy Council (Canada)
