= Jean Dowling =

Dame Jean Elizabeth Dowling, DCVO (née Taylor; 7 November 1916 – 22 December 2002) was a British courtier.

Jean Taylor was born on 7 November 1916, the daughter of Captain William Taylor who was killed in action during the First World War in 1917. She attended Tunbridge Wells High School and then served in the Women's Auxiliary Air Force during the Second World War. After the war, she worked at The Daily Telegraph and the Brains Trust before being employed by Eton College, which brought her to the attention of Buckingham Palace.

Dowling joined the Royal Household in 1958 and became Chief Clerk to the Queen's Private Secretary in 1961, serving until 1978. There, she was tasked with organising the Private Secretary's large staff and dealing with enquiries about the Queen. She travelled abroad with the Royal Household and was responsible for arranging the gifts the Queen gave to foreign dignitaries on official visits. Her "vigilance" and "discretion" were valued and, as The Times noted in her obituary, saw her rewarded with appointments to the Royal Victorian Order, successively through both classes of Member grade in 1964 and 1971, then as a Commander in 1976 and finally as Dame Commander on retirement in 1978.

== Family ==
Jean Taylor married Ambrose Francis Dowling, MVO, MBE, TD, in 1993 at the Savoy Chapel and the couple settled in Kent, but travelled widely in retirement. She died on 22 December 2002, at the age of 86.
