= Funk Island =

Uninhabited island off Newfoundland, Canada

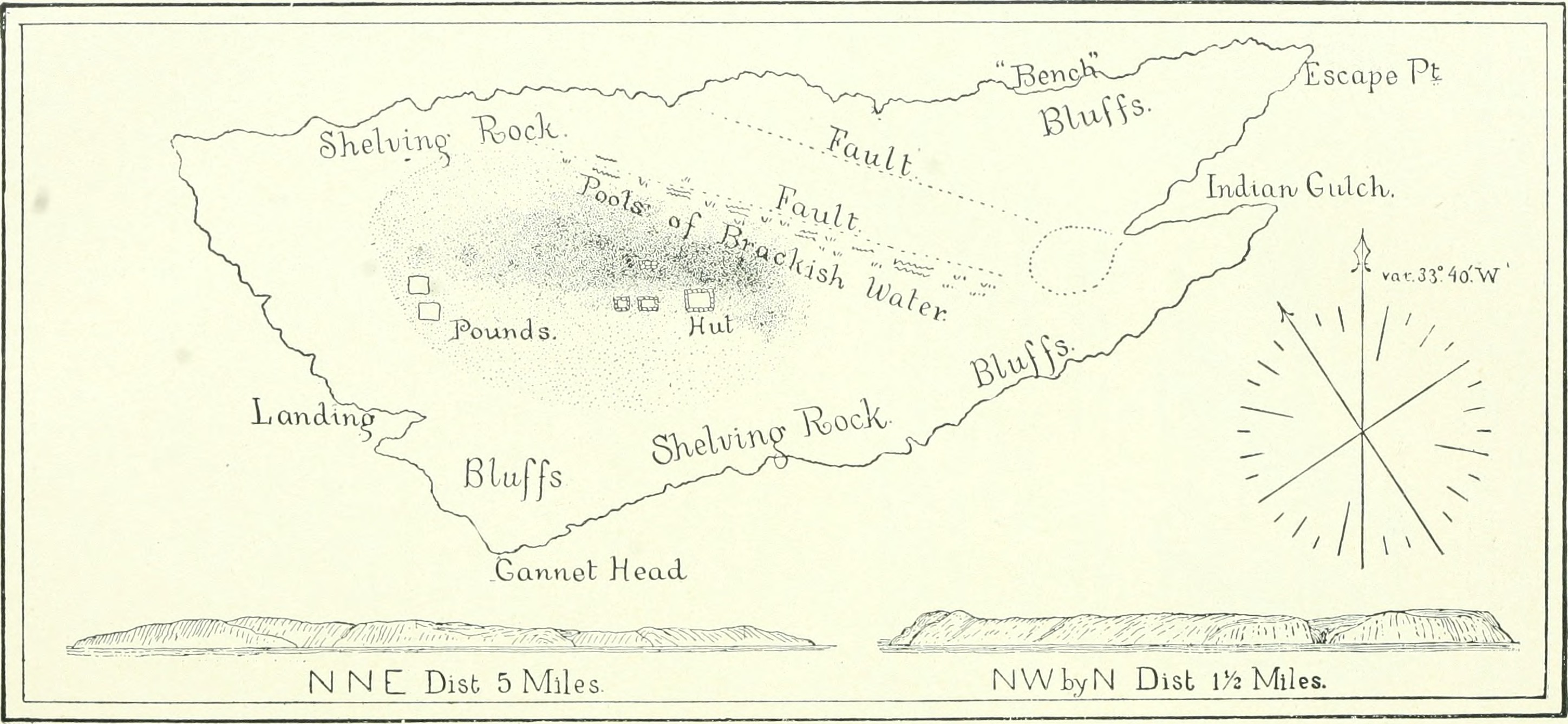
- Map of Funk Island showing concentration of Great Auk remains, 1887

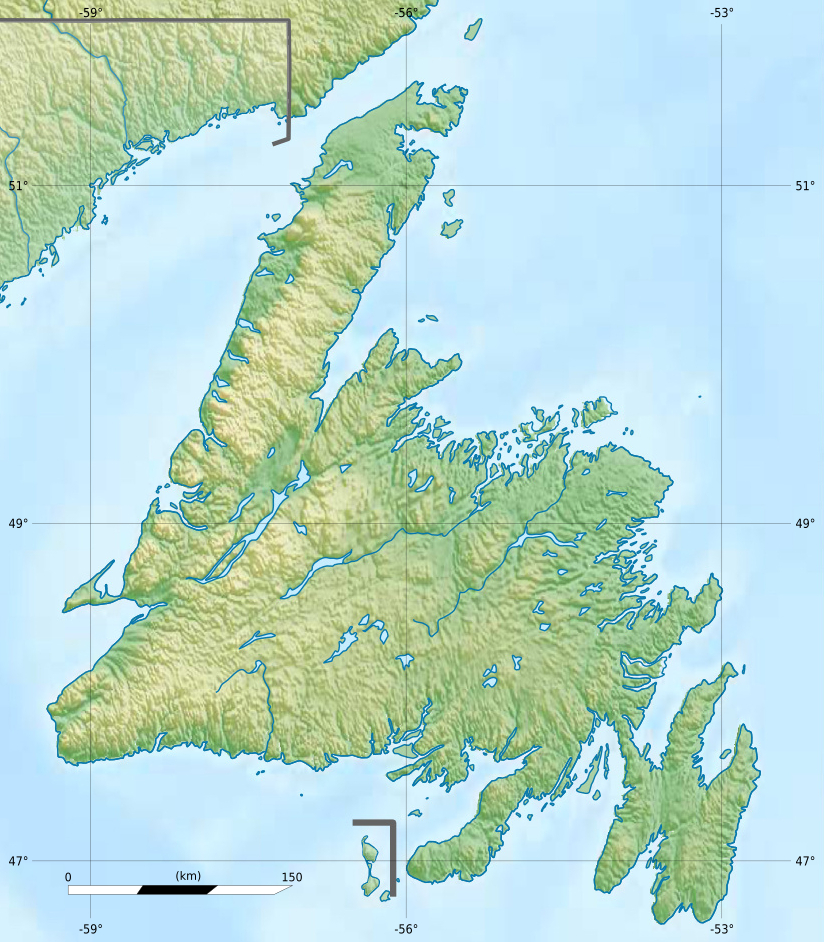
- Location within Newfoundland

Geography
- Location: Labrador Sea
- Coordinates: 49°45′24″N 53°11′02″W
- Length: 0.8 km (0.5 mi)
- Width: 0.3 km (0.19 mi)
- Highest elevation: 14 m (46 ft)

Administration
- Canada

Demographics
- Population: Uninhabited

Funk Island is a small, barren, isolated, uninhabited island approximately 65 kilometres (40 mi) northeast of Musgrave Harbour, Newfoundland, Canada. Of the large number of seabirds that breed on the island, the most abundant is the common murre. The island is a wildlife sanctuary and access is restricted.

== Geography ==
The island is roughly trapezoidal in shape, with a maximum length of 0.8 km (½ mile) and a maximum width of 0.3 km (300 yards) and is nearly flat, rising 14 metres (46 ft) out of the North Atlantic. The island is composed of feldspathic granite and is traversed by two distinct fault lines which cross the island in a northwesterly direction, almost parallel to each other. The fault lines divide the island into three separate entities. The northeastern portion consists mainly of bare rock; the central portion has scattered vegetation; and the largest portion of the island, the southwestern, which occupies over half of the land surface, is covered with grasses, lichens and mosses.

Landing on Funk Island is extremely difficult and dangerous, though in calm weather there are three points where a safe landing can be effected. Gannet Head, the southwestern corner of the island, and Landing Rock, just north of Gannet Head, are two such places. On the north side, approximately 0.17 km (190 yards) west of Escape Point, the easternmost tip of the island, there is a steep cliff. Set in the cliff is a natural shelf, called The Bench, approximately 1.2 metres (3.9 ft) wide, which slopes up the cliff face which allow relatively easy access to the surface.

The cold Labrador Current provides good breeding ground for cold water fish which in turn support the large breeding seabird population of the island. At high tide the seas break widely against the cliffs and in particularly high seas waves break over the island.

There are two large rock bunkers which lie off the southwest side of the island. The two bunkers are washed over by the sea, and provide roosting but not nesting areas for many of the seabirds, particularly the gannets. The island and the bunkers make up what is known as the "Funks."

There are no navigational aids or lighthouses on the island despite the number of shipwrecks and the loss of life which have occurred in the area.

== Name ==
=== Funk Island ===
The name Funk, which means evil odour or vapour, is thought to have been given to the island because of the foul odour which predominates there. The smell arises from the nitrate and phosphate concentrations found in the guano deposited by the many millions of birds which have nested there over the centuries. However, an alternative theory suggests that the name may be traced to a Norse or Icelandic word for a haycock which the island resembles.

=== Historical names ===
Before the 18th century, the island was referred to by sailors as Penguin Island or Island of the Birds, although the former name was also sometimes used to describe other islands off Newfoundland's coast (such as Fogo Island or the Penguin Islands).

Gaspar Corte-Real visited Newfoundland in 1501, and shortly after that date Funk Island appears on two maps by Pedro Reinel as Y Dos Saues (1504) and Ylhas das aves (1520), both of which refer to an island of birds. Richard Hakluyt, in The Principal Navigations, Voyages, Traffiques and Discoveries of the English Nation chronicled the 1536 voyage of Richard Hore which made landfall on the Island of Penguin. A 1626 map by Pierre Mortier labels the place I des Penguins, while an Italian map dated 1661 has the island marked as I Penguin Abonda di Vecelli (Penguin Island abounding with birds). One of the earliest British maps by cartographer Herman Moll, dated 1716, refers to it as Penguin Island. The name Funk Island appears on James Cook's 1775 map as it does in the charts and surveys compiled in 1765. According to the book Pioneers in Canada (Blackie and Sons 1912) Jacques Cartier in 1534 commented on the great number of birds and the presence of a polar bear on Funk Island.

Funk Island was probably called Penguin Island because the great auk used to nest on this island by thousands, and possibly tens of thousands, up to the late 18th century when its numbers declined drastically. However, the American Heritage Dictionary suggests the word "penguin", which may be derived from the Breton language penn gwenn meaning "white head", originated with the name of the island and subsequently become a synonym for "great auk". Bretons were settled in the near area of 'Terra de Bretones', mentioned on Verrazzano's map with their Ermins coat-of-arms.

== Demise of the great auk ==
It is believed that Funk Island was visited shortly after the first native peoples settled in northeastern Newfoundland. Joseph Banks, who visited Newfoundland and Labrador in 1766, told of a type of pudding the Beothuk people made from eggs which had been collected from Penguin (Funk) Island. In earlier times, the great auk was also known as the garefowl, from the Norse, "geirfugl".

In the early 16th century, Europeans were drawn to the codfish schools off the coast of Newfoundland. "Towards the end of a long transatlantic journey, when provisions were running low, fresh meat was prized, and the ease with which auks could be picked off the slab [Funk Island] was soon noted." Many explorers and fishing nations made trips to the Funks to acquire seabirds for food and oil for their lamps. The great auks were flightless birds that were an easy prey. In 1578, 350 Spanish and French vessels and fifty English vessels were reported fishing nearby. Later settlers along the northeast coast of Newfoundland often made the short trip to the Funks to kill birds for food and lamp oil; they also used the feathers for pillows and mattresses and gathered the eggs for food.

In 1622 Sir Richard Whitbourne told of how the birds were driven up the gang planks into the boats. He remarked that it was "as if God had made the innocency of so poore a creature, to become such an admirable instrument for the sustenation of man."

By 1800 the great auk was probably extinct on Funk Island, and by 1844, in the world.

== Scientific expeditions ==
Naturalists and scientists had become interested in the plight of the great auk and by June 1841 a Norwegian naturalist, Dr. Peter Stuvitz visited Funk Island with the hope of obtaining specimens of the birds, but was forced to leave due to weather conditions on the island.

The second visit of a scientific nature occurred in 1863, when Thomas Molloy, the United States Consul to Newfoundland, received permission from the Government of Newfoundland to go to the Funk Island to mine remains of the great auk. Thirty-five tons of the decomposed organic material was secured by Molloy's expedition. Of these five tons was sold locally at nineteen dollars a ton while the other thirty tons was shipped to Boston, Baltimore and Washington D.C., where it was used to fertilize the gardens of wealthy Americans.

In July 1874 the British seismologist and naturalist John Milne went to the island and was successful in retrieving partial skeletons and miscellaneous bones in the hour he spent there before inclement weather cut short his stay. He reported that there was an abundance of terns on Funk Island but that the murre and razorbill population had been almost destroyed by egg gatherers. In a hazardous landing and in only the one hour that was allowed by the dangerous tides and high waves surrounding the island, Milne discovered in a small, grassy hollow, the skeletal remains of no fewer than fifty birds. Some of them exceeded in size any that had before been known. His collection of great auk skeletons subsequently found its way into various public museums. In the article he wrote in 1875 describing his trip he included a detailed collection of facts relating to the extinct bird that covered five geographical regions, including prehistoric kitchen middens of Caithness.

The most successful of the early scientific expeditions to Funk Island occurred in 1887. It was sponsored by the United States Fish Commission and was under the direction of Frederick A. Lucas. After a brief sojourn in St. John's, the group's ship, Grampus, arrived at Funk Island on July 22, 1887. They found in their search area, roughly one quarter of the land surface of the island was covered with between 0.6 and 1.2 metres (2.0 and 3.9 ft) of earth. The earth contained egg shells mixed with granite pebbles in depths ranging from 5 to 30 centimetres (2.0 to 11.8 in). Many more skeletons were unearthed and taken away for other scientific study.

This expedition did other scientific work on Funk Island, including the collection of rock specimens. During their search of the island they also discovered several iron kettles, rusted and broken, which were believed to have been used to scald the bodies of the great auks to make removal of the feathers easier. Near the western edge of the auks' breeding grounds they discovered enclosures made of granite blocks. The Auks had been herded into these compounds to make slaughtering easier.

There have been many other expeditions since, right up to 1982. In 1964 the island became a Provincial Wildlife Sanctuary and landing there was prohibited without a permit. With the creation of the sanctuary, the bird population began to be protected and is now monitored by researchers at Memorial University and Environment and Climate Change Canada.

== Breeding colonies ==
Eleven marine bird species have been known to breed on Funk Island.

- Great auk
- Arctic tern
- Northern gannet
- Northern fulmar
- Great black-backed gull
- Herring gull
- Black-legged kittiwake
- Razorbill
- Thick-billed murre
- Atlantic puffin
- Common murre

In 1972 the largest population on the Funk Island was that of the common murre, estimated to be around 389,461 breeding pairs. A re-analysis with 2009 data estimated the common murre population to be 472,259 breeding pairs, the largest colony in the western North Atlantic. That number accounts for 67% of the breeding population in eastern North America, making Funk Island one of the most important seabird colonies in the world. In 1982 the seabird population on Funk Island was estimated at over 1,000,000 birds.
