= 1983 Birthday Honours =

British government recognitions

Queen's Birthday Honours are announced on or around the date of the Queen's Official Birthday in Australia, Canada, New Zealand and the United Kingdom. The dates vary, both from year to year and from country to country. All are published in supplements to the London Gazette, and many are formally conferred by the monarch (or her representative) some time after the date of the announcement, particularly for those service people on active duty.

The 1983 Queen's Birthday honours lists were announced on 10 June 1983.

At this time honours for Australians were still being awarded in the UK honours on the advice of the premiers of Australian states, as well as in the Australian honours system which had been established in 1975.

Recipients of honours are displayed here as they were styled before their new honours.

== United Kingdom ==
=== Life peer ===
==== Baron ====
- The Most Reverend and Right Honourable Stuart Yarworth Blanch. Archbishop of York.
- Sir James Edward Hanson. Chairman, Hanson Trust.
- George Anthony Geoffrey Howard, D.L. Chairman, British Broadcasting Corporation.
- Sir John Leonard King. Chairman, Babcock International PLC.

=== Privy Counsellor ===
- Peter Allan Renshaw Blaker, Minister of State Foreign and Commonwealth Office, 1979–81. Minister of State for the Armed Forces, Ministry of Defence, 1981–83.
- Sir Frank Cooper, G.C.B., C.M.G., Permanent Under-Secretary of State, Ministry of Defence, 1976–82.
- Sir Arthur Michael Palliser, G.C.M.G., Head of the Diplomatic Service, 1975–82.
- Peter Wynford Innes Rees, Q.C., Minister of State, H.M. Treasury, 1979–81. Minister of State, Department of Trade, 1981–83.

=== Knight Bachelor ===
- Michael Francis Atiyah, Royal Society Research Professor, Mathematical Institute, University of Oxford.
- Basil Davenport Blackwell, Vice-Chairman and Chief Executive, Westland PLC.
- John Dennis Boles, MBE, Director-General, The National Trust.
- Robert Lewis Fullarton Boyd, CBE, Professor of Physics, University of London, and Director of the Mullard Space Science Laboratory.
- Philip Antony Fyson Buck, QC. For Political and Public Service.
- Terence Burns, Chief Economic Adviser, H.M. Treasury.
- Geoffrey Chandler, CBE, Director-General, National Economic Development Office.
- Anthony Wakefield Cox, CBE, Architect.
- Hugh Guy Cubitt, CBE, Chairman, Housing Corporation.
- Rustam Moolan-Feroze, President, Royal College of Obstetricians and Gynaecologists.
- Charles Keith Frossard, Bailiff of Guernsey.
- Abraham Goldberg, Regius Professor of the Practice of Medicine, University of Glasgow.
- James Duncan Goold. For Public and Political services.
- Harold Edward Gurden. For Political and Public Service.
- Michael Aubrey Hamilton. For Political and Public Service.
- Philip Welsby Holland. For Political and Public Service.
- Ian Bruce Hope Hunter, MBE. For services to the Arts.
- Brigadier Leonard Henry Lee, CBE. For Political and Public Service.
- Duncan McDonald, CBE, Chairman and Chief Executive, NEI Group PLC. For services to Export.
- Alexander McGregor Graham Macmillan. For Political Service.
- Kenneth Macmillan, Principal Choreographer, The Royal Ballet.
- James William Miskin, QC (His Honour Judge Miskin), Recorder of London.
- Francis Patrick Neill, QC, Chairman, Press Council.
- Joseph Nickerson, Chairman, Nickerson Group.
- John Holbrook Osborn. For Political and Public Service.
- Leslie Porter, Chairman and Chief Executive, Tesco Stores (Holdings) PLC.
- Alfred Sherman. For Political Service.
- Norman Siddall, CBE, Chairman, National Coal Board.
- Clive Marles Sinclair, Chairman, Sinclair Research Ltd.
- Professor Stephen Harold Spender, CBE, Poet and Critic.
- Alan Arthur Walters, Personal Economic Adviser to the Prime Minister.
- Malcolm George Wilcox, CBE, lately Chairman, Export Guarantees Advisory Council.
- Alwyn Williams, Principal and Vice-Chancellor, University of Glasgow.
- William Maxwell Harries Williams, President, The Law Society of England and Wales.
- Woodrow Lyle Wyatt, Chairman, Horserace Totalisator Board.
- Roger William Young. For educational and public services, particularly in Scotland.

==== Australian States ====
State of Queensland

- Francis Thomas Moore. For service to the tourist industry and the community.
- Henry Sydney Williams, OBE. For services to the community.

=== Order of the Bath ===
==== Knight Commander of the Order of the Bath (KCB) ====
Military Division

Royal Navy

- Vice Admiral Sir David John Hallifax, K.B.E.
- Vice Admiral Peter Maxwell Stanford, M.V.O.

Army

- Lieutenant General Martin Baker Farndale, C.B., Colonel Commandant Royal Regiment of Artillery, Colonel Commandant Army Air Corps.

Royal Air Force

- Acting Air Marshal Michael John Armitage, C.B.E.
- Acting Air Marshal Patrick Bardon Hine.
- Acting Air Marshal Michael William Patrick Knight, C.B., A.F.C.

Civil Division

- George Lawrence Jose Engle, C.B., Q.C., First Parliamentary Counsel.
- Michael David Milroy Franklin, C.B., C.M.G., Permanent Secretary, Ministry of Agriculture, Fisheries and Food.
- Clive Anthony Whitmore, C.V.O., Permanent Secretary, Ministry of Defence.

==== Companion of the Order of the Bath (CB) ====
Military Division

- Rear Admiral Anthony Sanderson George.
- Rear Admiral David Conrad Jenkin.
- Rear Admiral John Keith Robertson.
- Major General William Maurice Allen (408929), late Royal Corps of Transport.
- Major General Eric Walter Barton, MBE (393871), Colonel Commandant Corps of Royal Engineers.
- Major General Derek Thomas Crabtree (427648), Colonel The Duke of Edinburgh's Royal Regiment (Berkshire and Wiltshire).
- Major General Sir David Hughes-Morgan, Bt., CBE (384230), Army Legal Corps.
- Major General Michael Frank Reynolds (412046), late The Queen's Regiment.
- Air Vice-Marshal Herbert Brian Kelly, MVO, Royal Air Force.
- Air Vice-Marshal Leslie William Phipps, AFC, Royal Air Force.
- Air Vice-Marshal Robert George Price, Royal Air Force.

Civil Division

- John Anthony Christopher, Chief Valuer, Board of Inland Revenue.
- Roy Henry Francis Croft, Deputy Secretary, Department of Industry.
- Ivor John Guest Davis, Comptroller-General, Patent Office, Department of Trade.
- Professor George Alfred Hugh Elton, Chief Scientist, Ministry of Agriculture, Fisheries and Food.
- Kenneth Frederick John Ennals, Deputy Secretary, Department of the Environment.
- Miss Susan Winthrop Fogarty, Under Secretary, Department of Transport.
- Stuart William Gilbert, Director, Department for National Savings.
- James Dominic George Hammer, H.M. Chief Inspector of Factories, Department of Employment.
- Lewis Dudley Hawken, Deputy Chairman, Board of Customs and Excise.
- Thomas Henry Kerr, Director, Royal Aircraft Establishment, Farnborough, Ministry of Defence.
- Robert Gavin Loudon McCrone, Secretary, Scottish Economic Planning Department.
- Kenneth Carmichael Macdonald, Deputy Secretary, Ministry of Defence.
- William Ernest Mason, Deputy Secretary, Ministry of Agriculture, Fisheries and Food.
- Mary Elizabeth, Mrs Hedley-Miller, Under Secretary, H.M. Treasury.
- Dallas Alfred Mithen, Commissioner, Harvesting and Marketing, Forestry Commission.
- Michael John Anthony Partridge, Deputy Secretary, Department of Health and Social Security.
- Peter George Perry, Under Secretary, Department of Health and Social Security.
- Clive Priestley, Under Secretary, Management and Personnel Office.
- Peter Damian Robinson, Deputy Secretary, Lord Chancellor's Department.
- William Johnstone Sharp, Controller and Chief Executive, H.M. Stationery Office.
- Ralph Frederick Dendy Shuffrey, CVO, Deputy Secretary, Home Office.
- Colin Macdonald Stewart, Directing Actuary, Government Actuary's Department.

===== Australian States =====
State of Tasmania

- Ian Grahame Inglis, State Under Treasurer.

=== Order of St Michael and St George ===
==== Knight Grand Cross of the Order of St Michael and St George (GCMG) ====
- Sir Percy Cradock, K.C.M.G., H.M. Ambassador, Peking.

==== Knight Commander of the Order of St Michael and St George (KCMG) ====
- Colin Frederick Figures, C.M.G., O.B.E., Foreign and Commonwealth Office.
- Oliver Grantham Forster, C.M.G., M.V.O., H.M. Ambassador, Islamabad.
- Hugh Thomas Arnold Overton, C.M.G., lately Director, British Trade Development Office, New York.
- Anthony James Williams, C.M.G., Leader of the United Kingdom Delegation to the Conference on Security and Co-operation in Europe, Madrid.

==== Companion of the Order of St Michael and St George (CMG) ====
- Clive Carruthers Clemens, M.C., British High Commissioner, Maseru.
- Robert Kerr Cunningham, Chief Natural Resources Adviser, Overseas Development Administration.
- Patrick Robin Fearn, Foreign and Commonwealth Office.
- John Calvert Griffiths, Attorney-General, Hong Kong.
- Colin Henry Imray, British Deputy High Commissioner, Bombay.
- Peter Laurence O'Keeffe, C.V.O., H.M. Ambassador, Dakar.
- Philip McKearney, H.M. Consul-General, Boston.
- Robert Michael Purcell, H.M. Ambassador, Mogadishu.
- Oswald James Horsley Robinson, O.B.E., Foreign and Commonwealth Office.
- Dougal Gordon Reid, H.M. Ambassador, Monrovia.
- Harry Charles Salter, D.F.C., lately Director (Finance), Commission of the European Communities, Brussels.
- Richard Christopher Samuel, British Deputy High Commissioner, New Delhi.
- William Kenneth Slatcher, C.V.O., British High Commissioner, Georgetown.
- John Nicholas Teague Spreckley, H.M. Ambassador, Seoul.
- William Kelvin Kennedy White, Foreign and Commonwealth Office.

===== Australian States =====
State of Queensland

- Dr Alphonso Jean Gardiner Nicholson. For service to medicine and the community.

=== Royal Victorian Order ===
==== Knight Commander of the Royal Victorian Order (KCVO) ====
- Charles Matthew Farrer, C.V.O.
- John Michael Moore, C.B., D.S.C.

==== Commander of the Royal Victorian Order (CVO) ====
- Howard Montagu Colvin, C.B.E.
- The Right Honourable Elizabeth, Lady Grimthorpe.
- Colonel William Henry Gerard Leigh, C.B.E., M.V.O.
- Group Captain Anthony Mumford, Royal Air Force.
- Commander Loftus Edward Peyton Jones, D.S.O., M.B.E., D.S.C., Royal Navy.
- George Douglas Pinker.
- Richard Henry Egerton Russell.
- Bernard Alfred Speight.
- The Reverend Canon Cecil Edwyn Young.

==== Member of the Royal Victorian Order (MVO) ====
At this time the two lowest classes of the Royal Victorian Order were "Member (fourth class)" and "Member (fifth class)", both with post-nominals MVO. "Member (fourth class)" was renamed "Lieutenant" (LVO) from the 1985 New Year Honours onwards.

Fourth Class

- Miss Daphne Russell Edmunds, M.B.E.
- Commander Richard Gregory Evans, Royal Navy.
- Robert Fellowes.
- Athole Stephen Hereford Kemp, O.B.E.
- The Honourable Diana Mary Robina Makgill, M.V.O.
- Gordon Reynolds.
- The Honourable Jean Constance, Mrs Wills.

Fifth Class

- Frank Newsome Berry.
- Miss Angela Margaret Bowlby, M.B.E.
- Edna Rosina, Mrs Canty.
- Miss Susan Lillian Derry.
- Lieutenant Commander Robert Montgomery Evans, Royal Navy.
- Superintendent John Maclean, Metropolitan Police.

==== Royal Victorian Medal (Silver) (RVM) ====
- Chief Technician Nicholas Anthony Copley, Royal Air Force.
- Divisional Sergeant Major James Green, M.B.E., The Queen's Bodyguard of the Yeomen of the Guard.
- Chief Petty Officer (Seaman) Garry Greenwood.
- Ronald Thomas Hankins.
- George Leonard Hasthorpe.
- Chief Petty Officer Cook Jeffrey Hughes.
- John Leishman.
- Sergeant John Raymond Taylor, B.E.M., Royal Air Force.
- Maurice John Watts.
- Charles Alexander Wright.

=== Order of the British Empire ===
==== Knight Grand Cross of the Order of the British Empire (GBE) ====
- Admiral Sir William Thomas Pillar, K.C.B.

==== Dame Commander of the Order of the British Empire (DBE) ====
- Rosamund Mary, Lady Holland-Martin, O.B.E., Chairman, National Society for the Prevention of Cruelty to Children.

==== Knight Commander of the Order of the British Empire (KBE) ====
- Vice-Admiral John Frederick Cadell.
- Major General David Calthorp Thorne, O.B.E., Deputy Colonel The Royal Anglian Regiment (Norfolk, Suffolk and Cambridgeshire).
- Acting Air Marshal Eric Clive Dunn, C.B., B.E.M., Royal Air Force.
- The Right Honourable Patrick Edmund, Earl of Limerick, lately Chairman, British Overseas Trade Board. For Services to Export.
- John Henry Bremridge, O.B.E., Financial Secretary, Hong Kong.

==== Commander of the Order of the British Empire (CBE) ====
Military Division

Royal Navy

- Captain David Belfield Nolan, Royal Navy.
- The Reverend Peter Owen Price, Q.H.C., Royal Navy.
- Captain Philip William Seton Stearns, Royal Navy

Army

- Brigadier John Bryan Bettridge (419358), late Royal Regiment of Artillery.
- Colonel Patrick Martin Blagden (443401), late Corps of Royal Engineers.
- Colonel Derek Brownson (456607), late Corps of Royal Engineers.
- Brigadier Frederick Peter Crawley, A.D.C. (390412), late Royal Army Ordnance Corps.
- Colonel Brian Charles Mellows Harding, M.C. (426898), late Royal Regiment of Artillery.
- Colonel (now Acting Brigadier) Michael Everard Thorne, O.B.E. (429944), late The Royal Anglian Regiment.
- Colonel Roger Neil Wheeler (475595), late The Royal Irish Rangers (27th (Inniskilling) 83rd and 87th).

Royal Air Force

- Air Commodore David Conway Grant Brook, Royal Air Force.
- Air Commodore Henton Silvester Carver, M.V.O., Royal Air Force.
- Group Captain William Edward Bliss, Royal Air Force.
- Group Captain John Edward Ffrancon Williams, Royal Air Force.

Civil Division

- Richard Henry Allen Amis, Chairman, Alfred Booth and Company PLC.
- Peter Henry Andrews, Headmaster, Henry Fanshawe School, Dronfield.
- Denis Midgley Arnold, Heather Professor of Music, University of Oxford.
- Eric Albert Ash, Pender Professor of Electronic and Electrical Engineering, University College, University of London.
- Lawrence Arthur Bains, D.L. For Political and Public Service.
- Anthony Baxter Baker, Regional Administrator, Northern Regional Health Authority.
- Thomas Baron, Chairman, Christian Salvesen (Properties) Limited.
- Peter Thomas Blake, Painter.
- Emily May, Mrs. Blatch. For Political and Public Service.
- Doreen Edna Joy, Mrs. Brooke, lately Deputy Director, Ministry of Defence.
- Raymond Frederick Burman, lately Chairman, West Indies Trade Advisory Group. For services to Export.
- Robert Duncan Catterall, Consultant Adviser in Genito-Urinary Medicine, Middlesex Hospital, London.
- George Clarke, Chief Officer, Hampshire Fire Brigade.
- Peter Clarke, Principal, Robert Gordon's Institute of Technology, Aberdeen.
- Miss Barbara Evelyn Clayton (Mrs. Klyne), Professor of Chemical Pathology and Human Metabolism, University of Southampton.
- Michael David Nevill Cobbold. For services to local government in Westminster.
- Basil Eugene Sinclair Collins, Deputy Chairman and Chief Executive, Cadbury Schweppes PLC.
- Professor John Philip Cooper, Director, Welsh Plant Breeding Station, Aberystwyth.
- John Michael Terence Wellesley Denison, Actor.
- Arthur Henry Alexander Dibbs, lately Deputy Chairman, National Westminster Bank PLC.
- Harry Ari Simon Djanogly, Chairman and Chief Executive, The Nottingham Manufacturing Company PLC.
- Gordon Elliott Fogg, Professor of Marine Biology, University College of North Wales, Bangor.
- Peter Walter Foster, O.B.E., M.C., T.D., D.L., Chairman and Managing Director, William White and Company (Switchgear) Ltd.
- Norman Edward Frost, Chief Scientific Officer (B), Department of Industry.
- William Nichol Garry, lately Assistant Secretary, H.M. Treasury.
- Eric John Gibson, Deputy Chief Scientific Officer, Department of the Environment.
- David Alec Graham, Director General, Greater Manchester Passenger Transport Executive.
- Albert Julian Granville, Chairman and Managing Director, Howard Doris Ltd.
- Miss Dulcie Winifred Catherine Gray (Mrs. Denison), Actress.
- Stanley William Grundy, Chairman, Grundy (Teddington) Group Ltd.
- William Jardine Harkness, lately President, Scottish Football Association.
- Eric Hartwell, lately Vice Chairman, Trusthouse Forte PLC.
- John Dennis Miles Hearth, Chief Executive, Royal Agricultural Society of England.
- David Burton Hobman, Director, Age Concern (England).
- Robert Edgar Hodd, Chairman, Preston Health Authority.
- Gyde Horrocks, For Political Service.
- Raymond Horrocks, Group Chief Executive, Cars, BL PLC.
- James Douglas Howden Hume, Deputy Chairman and Managing Director, Howden Group PLC, Glasgow.
- Robin Eliot Irvine, Consultant Physician, Department of Medicine for the Elderly, Hastings Health Authority.
- John Bryan Jefferson, Partner, Jefferson, Sheard and Partners.
- Professor Huw Morris-Jones. For Public Service in Wales.
- Michael Kelly, Lord Provost of Glasgow.
- William Leslie Kendall, lately Secretary General, Council of Civil Service Unions.
- Albert Laugharne, Q.P.M., Deputy Commissioner, Metropolitan Police.
- John Leather, Principal, Derby College of Further Education.
- Raymond John Leppard, Conductor, Harpsichordist and Composer.
- Trevor Oswin Lewis. For services to countryside conservation in Wales.
- John Luke Lowther, D.L. For Political and Public Service.
- Professor Bryan Keith-Lucas. For Political and Public Service.
- Thomas Russell McKnight, Assistant Secretary, Department of Economic Development, Northern Ireland.
- Matthew Macmillan, O.B.E., lately Controller, English Language and Literature Division, The British Council.
- John Hannah Forbes Macpherson. For public service in the West of Scotland, particularly to Glasgow Chamber of Commerce.
- Professor William Norton Medlicott, Senior Editor, Documents on British Foreign Policy.
- Peter Colin Michael, Chairman, Micro-Consultants Group Ltd.
- John Alfred Mills, Managing Director, Molins PLC. For services to Export.
- David William Mitchell. For Political and Public Service.
- John Royston Moore, Member, West Yorkshire Metropolitan County Council.
- George Henry Moores, Chairman, South Yorkshire Police Authority.
- Alistair Fleming Neilson, Solicitor and Chief Legal Adviser, Scottish Health Service.
- Eric Hamilton Nicoll, Deputy Chief Engineer, Scottish Development Department.
- Richard Edward Norman, Chairman and Managing Director, Thorn EMI Ferguson.
- Leonard Sidney Payne, Director of Distribution, J. Sainsbury PLC.
- Peter Charles Peddie, Partner, Freshfields and Company.
- James George Christopher Pilditch, Chairman, Aidcom International PLC.
- John Henry McKnight Pinkerton, Professor of Midwifery and Gynaecology, Queen's University of Belfast.
- Michael Vivian Posner, Chairman, Social Science Research Council.
- Leslie John Pym. For Political and Public Service.
- John Michael Raisman, Chairman, Shell UK Ltd.
- James Rankin, Principal Inspector of Taxes, Board of Inland Revenue.
- Bryan Colman Read, Chairman, R. J. Read (Holdings) Ltd.
- Cyril Norman Read, Business Consultant.
- Derek Harry Roberts, Director of Research, The General Electric Company PLC.
- Margaret Helen, Mrs. Rule, Archaeologist. For Services to the raising of the Mary Rose.
- Paul Johannes Rutteman, Partner, Arthur Young McClelland Moores and Company.
- Desmond Eric Renforth Scarr, Assistant Secretary, Department of Energy.
- Arthur Seldon, Economist.
- Professor John Cyril Smith, Member, Criminal Law Revision Committee.
- Kenneth Henry Stevens, Chief Executive Commissioner, The Scout Association.
- Maurice Frank Stonefrost, Comptroller of Finance, Greater London Council.
- Colonel Patrick Malcolm Brogden Sutcliffe, M.B.E., T.D., D.L., Chairman, Eastern Wessex, Territorial, Auxiliary and Volunteer Reserve Association.
- Anthony David Bernard Sylvester, Writer on Art.
- John Tavare, Chairman and Managing Director, Whitecroft PLC.
- Michael Goodiff Taylor. For Political and Public Service.
- Colin Edward Thompson, Director, National Galleries of Scotland.
- Robert Howard Garry Thomson, Scientific Adviser to the Trustees, National Gallery.
- Clive Edward Ian Thornton, Chief General Manager, Abbey National Building Society.
- John Race Godfrey Tomlinson, Director of Education, Cheshire.
- Brian Cecil Tooke. For Political and Public Service.
- Professor Owen Lyndon Wade, Dean of the Faculty of Medicine and Dentistry, University of Birmingham.
- Arnold Geoffrey Ward. For Political and Public Service.
- Gilbert Frank Wheelock, Executive Vice Chairman, Martini and Rossi Ltd.
- Rodney Wilkins, Principal Medical Officer, Department of Health and Social Security.
- George Williams, O.B.E., Director General, UK Offshore Operators' Association.
- Roy Joseph Withers, Deputy Chairman, Davy McKee Corporation PLC.
- Leonard Wolstenholme, B.E.M. For Political Service.
- Gilbert David Marson Wood. For services to Journalism.
- John Woodcock, Q.P.M., Chief Constable, South Wales Constabulary.
- Alfred Stanley Worrall, O.B.E. For public services in Northern Ireland.
- Miss Mary Rose Worster, Regional Nursing Officer, Mersey Regional Health Authority.
- Alfred Yates, lately Director, National Foundation for Educational Research in England and Wales.

Diplomatic Service and Overseas List

- Frederick John Barritt, Speaker of the House of Assembly, Bermuda.
- Miss Lydia Dunn, O.B.E. For public services in Hong Kong.
- Colvyn Hugh Haye, Director of Education, Hong Kong.
- Robert Thomas Mitchell Henry, M.V.O., O.B.E., Q.P.M., C.P.M., Commissioner of Police, Hong Kong.
- David Joy, Head of British Interests Section, Swiss Embassy, Buenos Aires.
- George Ranson Lee, C.V .O., Counsellor, H.M. Embassy, Berne.
- The Right Reverend Douglas Milmine, Anglican Bishop of Paraguay.
- Hugh Edward Richardson, O.B.E., President of the Senate, Bermuda.
- John Wilkes Tanner, lately Director of UNRWA, Jordan.
- The Most Reverend Robert Selby Taylor, Anglican Bishop of Central Zambia.
- Leslie Ernest Sidney Tuck. For services to British aviation interests in the U.S.A.

Australian States

State of Queensland

- Daniel Whitehead. For service as General Manager, XII Commonwealth Games Australia (1982) Foundation Limited.

==== Officer of the Order of the British Empire (OBE) ====
Military Division

Royal Navy

- Commander David Leonard Deakin, M.V.O. Royal Navy.
- Commander Eric Michael England, Royal Navy.
- Chief Officer (Acting Superintendent) Lois Francis, Women's Royal Naval Service.
- Commander William John Gibson, R.D.,* Royal Naval Reserve.
- Commander David Harold Lines, Royal Navy.
- The Reverend John Andrew George Oliver, Royal Navy.
- Commander Kenneth Macrae Steven, Royal Navy.
- Commander Stanley James Watson, Royal Navy.
- Commander Arthur James White, Royal Navy.
- Commander Reginald Brook Wrenn, Royal Navy.

Army

- Lieutenant Colonel Derek Baughan (453440), Royal Army Ordnance Corps.
- Lieutenant Colonel John Muir Clavering, M.C. (465919), Scots Guards.
- Lieutenant Colonel Peter Arthur Drewett (460506), Army Catering Corps.
- Lieutenant Colonel (now Colonel) Andrew Tobin Warwick Duncan M.V.O. (437051), Grenadier Guards.
- Lieutenant Colonel Robert Ewen, T.D. (478916), Corps of Royal Engineers, Territorial Army.
- Lieutenant Colonel (now Acting Colonel) Kenelm John Hathaway (463351), Army Air Corps.
- Lieutenant Colonel Roger Willis Hurles (463048), Royal Army Ordnance Corps.
- Lieutenant Colonel (Quartermaster) George Johnston (478412), Army Legal Corps, (now retired).
- Lieutenant Colonel Harold Hamilton Kerr (471293), Corps of Royal Engineers.
- Lieutenant Colonel Martin Thomas Owen Lloyd (443335), The Royal Regiment of Wales (24th/ 41st Foot).
- Lieutenant Colonel David Gordon Martin (412006), Royal Regiment of Artillery.
- Lieutenant Colonel Patrick David Mesquita (437118), The Royal Hussars (Prince of Wales's Own).
- Lieutenant Colonel James Alan Orr (443526), The Parachute Regiment.
- Lieutenant Colonel Adrian Gilbert Clement Weston Peck, M.B.E. (403723), The Queen's Own Hussars.
- Lieutenant Colonel Nicholas John Ridley, M.B.E. (471334), Queen's Own Highlanders (Sea- forth and Camerons).
- The Reverend Graham Henry Roblin, Chaplain to the Forces 2nd Class (452800), Royal Army Chaplains' Department.
- Lieutenant Colonel Roger David Kyffin Thompson (461510), Royal Corps of Signals.
- Acting Colonel Roger Charles Tomkins, T.D. (432942), Army Cadet Force attached from The Royal Anglian Regiment, Territorial Army (RARO Class 2).
- Lieutenant Colonel David Bryan Wynn Webb-Carter, M.C. (467644), Irish Guards.
- Lieutenant Colonel Malcolm George Halliday Wise (427035), Royal Corps of Signals.

Royal Air Force

- Wing Commander Richard Anthony King Crabtree (608035), Royal Air Force.
- Wing Commander John Herbert William Davis (4230154), Royal Air Force.
- Wing Commander Robert Ernest Holliday (4183431), Royal Air Force.
- Wing Commander Peter Anthony Kelly (609080), Royal Air Force.
- The Reverend Charles Cecil Macneill (507195), Royal Air Force.
- Wing Commander William David Pittham (3137385), Royal Air Force Volunteer Reserve (Training).
- Wing Commander John Victor Radice (3507289), Royal Air Force.
- Wing Commander Frederick Arthur Trowern, A.F.C. (4058982), Royal Air Force.
- Squadron Leader Michael Edwin Cole (2592998), Royal Air Force.

Civil Division

- William Barrie Abbott, Director, Society of Master Printers of Scotland.
- Professor Robert James Adam. For Political and Public Service.
- Kenneth John Alford, Member, English Industrial Estates Corporation.
- Richard Steene Allcock, Consultant, Endeavour Training.
- William Taylor Allen, M.B.E., Managing Director and Register of Dover Harbour Board.
- Derek John Allison, Managing Director, Purfleet Deep Wharf and Storage Company Ltd. Deputy Chairman, London Dock Labour Board.
- Douglas Kinloch Anderson, Chairman and Managing Director, Kinloch Anderson Ltd., Edinburgh.
- William Beveridge Anderson, Rector, Inverness High School.
- Stanley Andrew, Commercial Manager, Motor Industry Research Association.
- Victor Norman Hale Balme, Principal Collector, Board of Inland Revenue.
- Peter Geoffrey Bennett, T.D., Executive Director, International Operations, Lucas East West Ltd. For services to Export.
- Keith Howard Best, Partner, Messrs. Bullen and Partners.
- Paul Joseph Black, Professor of Education and Director, Centre for Science Education, Chelsea College, London.
- David Cyril Blackburn. For Political Service.
- Donald Webster Bradley. For Political and Public Service.
- John Byrom Bramwell, Commissioner, Warwickshire, St. John Ambulance Brigade.
- Ronald Frederick Broome, Deputy Chief Constable, West Midlands Police.
- Alexander Livingston Brown, Area Manager, Mid-Lancashire Area, North Western Electricity Board.
- George Percival Brown, Charman, George P. Brown (Holdings) Ltd.
- Michael Hugh Bryant, Chairman, West Midlands Export Club. For services to Export.
- Edwin Henry Buckland, T.D., Headmaster, Shiremoor Middle School, North Tyneside.
- Jean, Mrs. Burnham, Principal, Ministry of Defence.
- Albert Edward Cammidge. For services to local government in Doncaster and to the administra- tion of Doncaster Race Course.
- Leonard Carr, lately General Secretary, Amalgamated Society of Wire Drawers and Kindred Workers.
- Walter Carruthers, Manager, Ford Motor Company Ltd., Belfast.
- Frederick Michael Casson, Potter.
- Donald Montagu Gerard Chidson, M.C., Director General, The Caravan Club.
- Thomas Dalgleish Clarke, Regional Pharmaceutical Officer, Yorkshire Regional Health Authority.
- Kaines Adlard Coles. For services to Ocean Racing and Yachting.
- Edward Geoffrey Lissant Collins. For services to the community in Rochdale.
- Henry Coote, Principal, Department of Finance and Personnel, Northern Ireland.
- James Vincent Corcoran, Superintending Civil Engineer, Department of the Environment
- John Bowes Corrin. For Political and Public Service.
- Robert Rainey Craik, T.D. For Political Service.
- Miss Joan Crofts. For Political Service.
- William Joseph Crowther, Superintending Engineer, Department of the Environment, Northern Ireland.
- Arthur Stuart Michael Cummings, Cartoonist, Daily Express and Sunday Express Newspapers.
- Eric John Michael Davies, Conservator of Forests for South Scotland, Forestry Commission.
- Miss Margaret Adelaide Day, Chief Nursing Officer, Tower Hamlets Health Authority.
- Professor Denis Henry Desty, Scientific Consultant, BP Research Centre, Sunbury-on-Thames.
- James Daniel Devlin, Registrar, General Optical Council.
- Roy Trevor Donaldson, Member, Somerset County Council and Sedgemoor District Council.
- James George Dunkley, Chairman, Management Committee, School for Dental Therapists.
- William Michael Eaton, Director, North Yorkshire Area, National Coal Board.
- William Grist Eborn, Chairman, The Cottage Homes.
- Eric Ray Ellen, lately Chief Secretary, London Transport Executive.
- Captain Richard Kenneth Nicholson Emden, D.S.C., R.N. (Retd.), Regional Controller, Dover Region, H.M. Coastguard, Department of Trade.
- Hugh Devereux Evans, Chief Regional Scientific Adviser for Home Defence, London Region.
- Thomas William Farthing, Managing Director, IMI (Titanium) Ltd.
- Christopher George Begbie Farwell, Headmaster, County Secondary School, Eastham, Wirral.
- Joyce Edith, Mrs. Foster. For Political and Public Service.
- John William Frazer, V.R.D., Chairman, Frazer and Haughton Ltd.
- John Lowry Dunseath Gailey, Managing Director, Giddings and Lewis-Fraser Ltd., Abroath.
- Miss Mary Geraldine Edith Giles, Principal Department of Education and Science.
- John McCune Gilmour, D.F.M., lately Senior Principal, Department of Health and Social Security.
- Roy Goulding, Chairman, Scientific Sub-Committee of the Advisory Committee on Pesticides.
- James Cuthbertson Gray, Treasurer, Highland Health Board.
- Charles Wilson Green. For services to Golf.
- Thomas Greenwell, Chief Leader Writer, Yorkshire Post.
- Harold Norman Greenwood, Chief Executive, National Seed Development Organisation Ltd.
- Janusz Kazimierz Grodecki, Professor of Law, University of Leicester.
- Mary Elizabeth, Mrs. Haggart, lately Chief Area Nursing Officer, Tayside Health Board.
- Thomas Edward Hall, Member, Bradford City Council.
- Bryan Hanson, Leader, Hartlepool District Council.
- Major James Richard Edwards Harden, D.S.O.,M.C., D.L. For services to land drainage in Wales.
- Francis William Hawkins, H.M. Inspector of Schools, Department of Education and Science.
- Colin Vernon Hewett, Q.P.M., Deputy Assistant Commissioner, Metropolitan Police.
- Peter Leslie Victor Hickman, Managing Director, Space and Communications Division, British Aerospace PLC.
- Harold Higgins, Inspector, Board of Inland Revenue.
- Rachel Mary, Lady Higgs, Area Organiser, West Midlands Counties, Women's Royal Voluntary Service.
- Norman Chipchase Hilditch, Regional Secretary, East Midlands Region, British Gas Corporation.
- Miss Thora Hird (Mrs. Scott), Actress.
- Francis Ronald Hirst, lately Principal Scientific Officer, Ministry of Defence.
- George Walter Hodgson. For services to the Keswick Branch, Royal Air Forces' Association.
- Kim Guy Felix Britton Howe, Leader, Hammersmith and Fulham London Borough Council.
- Hugh Raymond Howse, General Manager, External Business and Development, British Broadcasting Corporation.
- Squadron Leader Ronald Alfred Hudson, R.A.F. (Retd.). For Political and Public Service.
- John McFarlane Hughes, Chairman, Glasgow Area Manpower Board.
- Michael Carney Gray Hunter, Chairman/Managing Director, Hunter-Print Group PLC.
- Ian Somerville Hutchison. For services to local government in Scotland.
- Miss Phyllis Dorothy James (Mrs. White), Novelist.
- Gilbert Jenkins, M.C. For services to the Sea Cadet Association.
- Gladys Mildred, Mrs. Jones, Chairman, Northern Ireland Home Safety Council. Vice Chairman, National Home Safety Committee, Royal Society for the Prevention of Accidents.
- Silvain Edouard Josse, General Medical Practitioner, New Southgate, Haringey.
- James Kennedy, Songwriter.
- John Christopher Durham Kenyon, Director, J. H. Kenyon Ltd.
- Miss Marian Murray Kershaw, Director, North Western Museum and Art Gallery Service.
- Alan Ramon Keys, D.F.C., Divisional Director of Marketing and Product Support, Warton Division, Aircraft Group, British Aerospace PLC. For services to Export.
- George Hubert Lee. For Political and Public Service.
- Robert Martin Lee, Chief Probation Officer, Lancashire Probation Service.
- Salmond Solomon Levin. For services to the Jewish Community in Britain.
- Henry Ross Lewis, Manager, Home Procurement and Exports, The Fyffes Group Ltd.
- Lady Mary Rosemary Marie-Gabrielle Mansel-Lewis, President, Dyfed Branch, British Red Cross Society.
- Andrew Noel Lightbody, Q.F.S.M., Chief Fire Officer, Cheshire Fire Brigade.
- James William Lightbown, Head, Division of Antibiotics, National Institute for Biological Standards and Control.
- Albert Little, Leader, Bury Metropolitan Borough Council.
- Walter Francis Long, Commercial General Manager, Vosper Thornycroft (U.K.), Ltd. For services to Export.
- James Love. For services to the Young Men’s Christian Association Movement.
- Bernard Lubert, Company Chief Engineer, Marks and Spencer PLC.
- John Menhinick Lukies, D.L. For services to the community in Essex.
- rancis Geoffrey Hugh Lupton, Deputy Director, Plant Breeding Institute, Cambridge.
- Tom McDonald, Chairman, Armitage and Norton PLC.
- Alexander Paul Charrier McKee, Naval Historian. For services to the location of the Mary Rose.
- Peter John McLachlan, Secretary, Belfast Voluntary Welfare Society.
- James Lloyd McQuitty, Q.C., Chairman of Trustees, Ulster Folk and Transport Museum.
- Robert Alfred Maguire, Partner, Maguire and Murray. Head of the Department of Architecture, Oxford Polytechnic.
- Wing Commander John Douglas Mallinson, A.F.C., R.A.F. (Retd.), Special Project Adviser, Lansings Ltd.
- Robert Desmond Meikle, lately Principal Scientific Officer, Herbarium, Royal Botanic Gardens, Kew.
- Jack Elius Miller, General Medical Practitioner, Glasgow.
- James Ewen Milne, Senior Principal, Scottish Economic Planning Department.
- Moyra, Mrs. Mitchell, Member, Northern Ireland Housing Executive Board. Director, Fold Housing Association.
- Monty Modlyn (Montague Modlyn). For charitable services.
- Major James Robert More-Molynesux, D.L. For services to the community in Surrey.
- Jack Morhan, Assistant Managing Director, Navy, Army and Air Force Institutes.
- Robin Hugh Morland. For Political and Public Service.
- John Arthur Elwell Morley, M.B.E., Chairman, Plunkett Foundation for Co-operative Studies.
- Wyndham Peter Mullen, Director-General, National Kidney Research Fund.
- Nan Esther, Mrs. Myer, M.B.E. For Political and Public Service.
- Yfrah Neaman, Head of Advanced Solo Studies, Guildhall School of Music and Drama.
- Bertram William George Old. For services to the Magistracy in Dorset.
- Catherine Mair, Mrs. Owen, lately Nurse Adviser (Child Health), South West Surrey District Health Authority.
- Reginald Ernest Parker, Member, Northern Ireland Nature Reserves Committee. Senior Lecturer in Botany, Queen's University of Belfast.
- William Raymond Parkes, Senior Medical Officer, Department of Health and Social Security.
- Nelia, Mrs. Penman. For Political Service.
- Stanley William Percival, Principal, Charlotte Mason College of Education, Cumbria.
- Peter John Phillips, Director, Western Area, Blue Circle Cement, Blue Circle Industries PLC.
- Charles Richard Poor, Director of Social Work, Lanark Division, Strathclyde Region.
- Michael Robert Porter, Superintending Landscape Architect, Department of Transport.
- Winford Hugh Protheroe Price, Treasurer, Association of District Councils for Wales.
- Anthony David Pugh, Senior Principal, Department of Employment.
- Eric Edgar Quinney, Director of Computing Services (Assistant Secretary), Metropolitan Police.
- Edwin Douglas Rainbow, Chief Executive, London and Hull Maritime Insurance Company Ltd.
- Philip Rees, Chief Civil Engineer, Western Region, British Rail.
- William Ralph Riddington, Farmer and Chairman, East of England Agricultural Society.
- Gavin John Ring. For Political and Public Service.
- Stanley Eric Roberts. For Political and Public Service.
- George Robertson, Chairman, Management Committee, State Hospital, Carstairs.
- George Ernest Robertson, Managing Director, Landis and Gyr Company Ltd. For services to Export.
- Peter Neville Robson, Professor of Electronic and Electrical Engineering, University of Sheffield.
- Stanley James Rogers, lately Principal Scientific Officer, Ministry of Defence.
- Harold David Rosenthal, Editor "Opera" Magazine.
- Ronald Alexander Rush, Director, British Food Export Council.'
- Roy Sanderson, Member, Electronic Consumer Goods Sector Working Party.
- Peter James Saunders, Deputy Chief Inspector, Home Office.
- Stuart Henry Seaton, Managing Editor, Farmers Guardian.
- Miss Helen Seed, lately Director of Social Services, West Sussex County Council.
- Fernando Riccardo Alberto Semprini, Pianist.
- Dennis Irving Signy, Editor, Hendon Times Group of Newspapers.
- James Alexander Sloggie, lately H.M. Inspector of Schools (Higher Grade), Scottish Education Department.
- Donald Smith, Q.P.M., Deputy Chief Constable, Avon and Somerset Constabulary.
- James Scott Smith. For Political and Public Service.
- James William Ford-Smith. For services to the disabled in Northern Ireland.
- Kingsley Smith. For public services in Truro.
- Cynthia Barbara, Mrs. Stewart, lately Senior Principal, Ministry of Defence.
- James Stobo, President Board of Directors, Animal Diseases Research Association.
- Adrian Victor Stokes, Vice-President, Disabled Drivers' Motor Club. Governor, Motability.
- Thomas John Tait, Chairman and Managing Director, Thomas Tait and Sons Ltd., Inverurie.
- Miss Ann Pamela Thomas. For Political and Public Service.
- Cedric Marshall Thomas, lately Chairman, Wolverhampton Area Manpower Board.
- Miss Dora Elizabeth Thomas, Head of Films, Shell International Petroleum Company Ltd.
- Howell Glyndwr Thomas, Public Affairs Executive, The Rank Organisation.
- Tydfil Davies, Mrs. Thomas, Headmistress, Aberdare Girls' Comprehensive School.
- Miss Ethel Dorothy Barbara Thompson, Member, Scientific Staff, Medical Research Council, Medical Sociology Unit, Aberdeen.
- Michael Toll, Music Adviser, London Borough of Newham.
- Peter Henry Tombleson. For services to Angling.
- Nigel Godwin Tranter, Writer.
- Pamela Kingsbury, Mrs. Tredinnick, Founder, Farrell Charitable Trust, (Cheshire Foundation).
- Kennard William Tyson, Executive Director, Production, Short Bros. Ltd. For services to Export.
- William Uden, lately Headmaster, St. Thomas the Apostle Roman Catholic Secondary School, Southwark.
- Ernest Felix Velden. For services to the frozen food industry.
- Frank Richard Vickers, Financial Controller, Lloyds Register of Shipping.
- Lionel George Stuart-Menteth Wadeson, Assistant Secretary-General, General Synod of the Church of England.
- David Brownfield Wain, Chairman, Inland Waterways Amenity Advisory Council.
- Edward George Wakeham, Housing Director, F. Rendell & Sons Ltd.
- Solomon Wand, lately General Medical Practitioner, Birmingham.
- Desmond Geoffrey Ward, Director, Redundant Churches Fund.
- Wilfred Ward, Chairman, Ward Brothers (Sherburn) Ltd. For services to Export.
- James Warwick. For services to the Arts in Northern Ireland.
- Eric Watson, lately Technical Director, Washington Development Corporation.
- William George Wells, Senior Principal, Department of Industry.
- Gerald Arthur Whately, Chairman, The Royal United Kingdom Beneficent Association.
- Norman Keith Whetstone, V.R.D., Director, The Birmingham Post and Mail Ltd. Editor-in-Chief, Birmingham Evening Mail Series.
- Eustace Lovett Williams, County Surveyor, Suffolk County Council.
- Dennis Grosvenor Wilson, Deputy Chairman, South Western Region, British Gas Corporation.
- Geoffrey Hawkins Wilson, Chief Inspector of Schools, Directorate of Educational Services, Kirklees Metropolitan Council.
- James Henry Wilson, Chairman, Staff Side, Optical Whitley Council.
- Robert William Wilson, General Manager, Fane Valley Co-operative Agricultural and Dairy Society Ltd.
- Berthold Ludwig Wolpe, Graphic Designer.
- Donald Woodhouse, Assistant Chief Secretary, Church Army.
- George Henry Woods, M.B.E., Director Field Services, National Association of Boys' Clubs.
- Gordon Wragg. For services to the community in Sheffield.
- Geoffrey Tyndale Young. For services to Peptide Chemistry.

Diplomatic Service and Overseas List

- John Stewart Acton, Regional Director, British Council, São Paulo.
- Dr. Vere Anthony Atkinson, British Council Representative, Sri Lanka.
- Michael James Bamber. For services to British commercial interests in Belgium.
- Ieuan Cedric Batten, lately Deputy Secretary, Presidents Office Kiribati.
- Eric Bolton. For services to electrical engineering training in Zambia.
- Dr. Chin Kwan-how, Consultant Physician, Government Medical Service, Hong Kong.
- Clarence Matthias Christian. For public and community services in the British Virgin Islands.
- Michael Brendan Collins, M.B.E., H.M. Consul, British Consulate, Halifax, Nova Scotia.
- Franklin Benjamin Connor, J.P ., Permanent Secretary (Finance), Anguilla.
- Neville Frederick Date, First Secretary (Commercial), H.M. Embassy, Washington.
- Jeffery Howard Eastwood. For services to the British community in Warsaw.
- George Howell Fisher, Cultural Attaché (British Council) H.M. Embassy, Budapest.
- Patrick David Furlong. For services to the British community in Bombay.
- Joseph Francis Gahan, First Secretary and Consul, H.M. Embassy, Paris.
- Dennis Rupert Gallwey, First Secretary, H.M. Embassy, Islamabad.
- Robert Anthony Eagleson Gordon, lately First Secretary and Head of Chancery, H.M. Embassy, Santiago.
- Keith Rutherford Gosling, lately First Secretary U.K. Mission to the I.A.E.A., Vienna.
- Dr. Robert John Gourlay, Chief Medical Officer, Bermuda.
- Evelyn Mary, Mrs. Harding. For services to nursing training in The Gambia.
- Derrick Newstead Hester. For services to British commercial and community interests in Tanzania.
- Bryan Eric Isaacs. For services to British commercial interests in Los Angeles.
- Hugh Brian Jackson. For services to agricultural development in Cyprus.
- Brian Dennis Keep, Director of Civil Aviation, Hong Kong.
- Clifford Maurice King. For services to British commercial and community interests in Chile.
- Donald Ian Kinloch, T.D. For services to British ex-servicemen in Paris.
- Michael Hanby Lander. For services to British commercial interests in New Zealand.
- Alastair Malcolm Langlands, M.B.E. For services to agricultural development in Nepal.
- Leo Lee Tung-Hai, M.B.E. For community services in Hong Kong.
- Lewis Arthur Radbourne. For services to British commercial and community interests in Tokyo.
- Dacre Francis Alexander Raikes. For services to British cultural interests in Thailand.
- Bernard Randell. For services to the British community in Mexico City.
- Dr. Philip Howell Rees. For services to medical training in Kenya.
- Malcolm Hill Reid. For services to British commercial interests in Kenya.
- Robin Allan Noele Reid. For services to British commercial and community interests in Oporto.
- Frank Edmond Short, Principal Government Engineer, Hong Kong.
- Jack Charles Collings Sloman, M.B.E., Deputy Consul-General, British Consulate-General, Los Angeles.
- John Louis Soong. For public services in Hong Kong.
- Patrick Joseph Sullivan, British Deputy High Commissioner, Lilongwe.
- Michael Charles Thompson. For services to British commercial and community interests in Lagos.
- Gordon Anthony Tindale, British Council Representative, Zambia.
- Miss Yvonne Jeanne Eva Veale, First Secretary and Consul, H.M. Embassy, Rome.
- William Alfonso Wilkinson. For services to fisheries development in Tanzania.

Australian States

State of Queensland

- Donald Robert Eather. For service to agriculture,
- Howard Jones. For service to the coal industry.
- William Silvester Norton. For services to the meat and livestock industries.
- Sister Eileen Stephanie Purtill. For services to the community.
- Miss Norma Muriel West. For services to nursing.

State of Tasmania

- Geoffrey Lambert Hudson, J.P . For service to the community.

==== Member of the Order of the British Empire (MBE) ====
Military Division

Royal Navy

- Lieutenant (CS) Leonard Beech, Royal Navy.
- Lieutenant Norman Jeffrey Binns, Royal Navy.
- Fleet Chief Petty Officer Steward CHAN Yui Kwan, 0.2939.
- Warrant Officer First Class Andrew Charles Crofts, Royal Marines, PO17185L.
- Lieutenant Commander (SCC) Alistair Mackenzie Cross, Royal Naval Reserve.
- Lieutenant Commander Anthony Gascoigne Dyer, Royal Navy.
- Surgeon Lieutenant Commander Charles Dalby Fisher, R.D., Royal Naval Reserve.
- Lieutenant Commander David John Baden Forsey, Royal Navy.
- Fleet Chief Air Engineering Artificer Edward Goodwill, F668389N.
- Captain (Acting Major) Andrew John Wentworth Higginson, Royal Marines.
- Lieutenant Commander Alan Russell Jackson, Royal Navy.
- Lieutenant Commander Andrew Philip Johnson, Royal Navy.
- Lieutenant Commander Alfred George Kennedy, Royal Navy.
- First Officer Elizabeth Anne Roscoe, Women's Royal Naval Service.
- Lieutenant Commander Melvyn Sutcliffe, Royal Navy.
- Lieutenant Commander Jack Stanley Woolnough, Royal Navy.

Army

- Major Alan Behagg (485672), The Royal Anglian Regiment.
- 24075436 Warrant Officer Class 2 Peter Burles Biggs, Intelligence Corps.
- Major John Michael Bowles (490332), Royal Corps of Transport.
- Major William Guy Colin Bowles (473888), 14th/ 20th King's Hussars.
- Captain Jonathan Charles Brannam (493688), Corps of Royal Engineers (now RARO).
- 22207419 Warrant Officer Class 2 Reginald Robert Brotherwood, B.E.M., Royal Pioneer Corps (now discharged),
- Major Noel Hazeldine Carding (484287), Royal Army Veterinary Corps.
- Major Keith Maxwell Cook (479195), The Royal Regiment of Fusiliers.
- Major James Conyngham Peters Cross (445830), The King's Regiment.
- Acting Major George Strang Dinnie (497034), Army Cadet Force, Territorial Army.
- Major Michael Charles Dorward (492695), Corps of Royal Electrical and Mechanical Engineers.
- 23716713 Warrant Officer Class 2 David Duncan, 51st Highland Volunteers, Territorial Army.
- Captain (Technical Officer Telecommunications) Alan Frederick Dyer (502835), Royal Corps of Signals.
- Captain (Assistant Paymaster) Howard James Esgate (502308), Royal Army Pay Corps,
- 22589264 Warrant Officer Class 2 Thomas Duffy Forbes, Royal Regiment of Artillery, Territorial Army.
- Major Malcolm Macpherson Fordyce, T.D. (460746), Royal Regiment of Artillery, Territorial Army.
- Major (Quartermaster) George Wilfred Gay (498547), Corps of Royal Engineers, Territorial Army.
- Major Adrian Anthony Gilbert (484618), The Light Infantry.
- 23705810 Warrant Officer Class 2 (now Acting Warrant Officer Class 1) Barry Denham Gisborne, Royal Army Medical Corps.
- Major Anthony Arthur Edward Glenton, T.D. (470789), Royal Regiment of Artillery Territorial Army.
- Acting Major George Grant, M.M. (490323), Army Cadet Force, Territorial Army.
- Major Jeremy Rigg Harrison (485740), Corps of Royal Engineers.
- Major (Quartermaster) David Martin Holloway (498301), Corps of Royal Engineers.
- Major Robin Arthur Gerald Lee (490316), Royal Army Ordnance Corps.
- Major Robert Adrian Leitch (495635), Royal Army Medical Corps.
- 23514406 Warrant Officer Class 2 Alexander Livingstone, Royal Regiment of Artillery.
- Captain Brian Lloyd (510724), Corps of Royal Engineers.
- Captain (Traffic Officer), William Andrew Locke (515538), Royal Corps of Signals.
- 23865641 Warrant Officer Class 1 Samuel Lewis Loughlin, Royal Army Pay Corps.
- Captain (Acting Major) Kevin Mallett (504793), The Parachute Regiment.
- 23851524 Warrant Officer Class 2 Romanu Naceva, Royal Regiment of Artillery.
- Major Gerard O'Hara (492909), The Parachute Regiment.
- Major Gerald Francis Oliver, T.D. (482444), The Parachute Regiment, Territorial Army.
- 23857351 Warrant Officer Class 1 Brian Hedley Pask, Corps of Royal Electrical and Mechanical Engineers (now discharged).
- Major John Michael Patrick Regiment of Artillery.
- Captain (Quartermaster) Frederick John Perry (502299), The Royal Anglian Regiment.
- Captain (Gurkha Commissioned Officer) (Quartermaster) Rambahadur Gurung, B.E.M. (486459), 7th Duke of Edinburgh's Own Gurkha Rifles.
- Major John Robb (494793), Royal Pioneer Corps.
- 23489550 Warrant Officer Class 1 Norman Mollart Rogerson, The Black Watch (Royal Highland Regiment).
- Major (Quartermaster) Herbert Michael Tarbuck (498469), The Cheshire Regiment.
- 23830409 Warrant Officer Class 1 Ronald Thomas, Royal Regiment of Artillery.
- 24059945 Warrant Officer Class 2 Philip Thompson, Small Arms School Corps.
- Major King-Cheung Ng, Royal Hong Kong Regiment (The Volunteers).

Royal Air Force

- Squadron Leader Howard James Boardman (8020966), Royal Air Force.
- Squadron Leader John Leslie Davison (608970), Royal Air Force.
- Squadron Leader Christopher James Hockley (608900), Royal Air Force.
- Squadron Leader Peter David Michael John (686980), Royal Air Force.
- Squadron Leader Ian. Peter George Loughborough (4335290), Royal Air Force Regiment.
- Squadron Leader Ida McKeown (2828819), Women's Royal Air Force.
- Squadron Leader John Allan McLoughlin 5200850), Royal Air Force.
- Squadron Leader Alastair Campbell Montgomery (2619737), Royal Air Force.
- Squadron Leader Reginald Nicholson (207520), Royal Air Force Volunteer Reserve (Training).
- Squadron Leader Lionel William Risdale Parkin (585654), Royal Air Force.
- Squadron Leader Victor Albert Pheasant (4220107), Royal Air Force.
- Squadron Leader Thomas Andrew Salter (507823), Royal Air Force.
- Squadron Leader Aidan Scotland (4184894), Royal Air Force.
- Squadron Leader Alan Scott (181949), Royal Air Force (Retired).
- Squadron Leader Farquharson Urquhart (55872), Royal Air Force (Retired).
- Squadron Leader Anthony David Waddell (4335679), Royal Air Force.
- Flight Lieutenant Robin Barry Aherne (587399), Royal Air Force.
- Flight Lieutenant Ronald Boxell, B.E.M. (4014207), Royal Air Force.
- Flight Lieutenant Alan Jones (8023232), Royal Air Force.
- Flight Lieutenant Harry Knight (138913), Royal Air Force Volunteer Reserve (Training).
- Warrant Officer Alfred John Pagden (K0587490), Royal Air Force.
- Warrant Officer Gordon Robertson (BO582969), Royal Air Force.
- Warrant Officer Trevor Joseph Teale (Q4132459), Royal Air Force.

Civil Division

- Miss Elizabeth Adshead, Co-Ordinator, Trafford District, Greater Manchester Branch, British Red Cross Society.
- Miss Sadie Ross Aitken. For services to the Theatre in Scotland.
- James Alan Andrew, Yard Manager, Falmouth Shiprepair Ltd.
- Winsome Joyce de Preaux, Mrs. Applegate, T.D. For services to the community in Wiltshire.
- Robert Armstrong, Divisional Manager, Worcestershire Division, Midlands Electricity Board.
- Cecil Charles Atkinson. For services to Paraplegic Sport.
- Richard Frank John Avery, Inspector (Higher Grade), Board of Inland Revenue.
- Alexander Davidson Baird, Chairman, Scottish Pelagic Fishermen's Association Ltd.
- William Francis Ball, Higher Executive Officer, Department of Industry.
- Derek Barker, Superintendent, South Yorkshire Police.
- Lionel James Baston, Manager, Small Firms Information Centre, Scottish Development Agency.
- Gilbert James Bates, First Aid Training Officer, Ministry of Defence.
- Robert Charles Baxter, Assistant Chief Production Engineer, Baker Perkins Ltd.
- Peter Maxwell Bedford, lately Director of Tourism and Leisure, Eastbourne Borough Council.
- Miss Eunice Anne Bent, lately Director of Education,.Royal College of Midwives.
- Mario Bernardi, Member, Inverness District Council.
- William James Best, Member, Oswestry Borough Council.
- Elsie, Mrs. Bibby. For Political and Public Service.
- Francis Jessop Bingley, lately Warden and Director of Studies, Flatford Mill Field Centre.
- Robert Blackburn, Group Controller, Carlisle Group, United Kingdom Warning and Monitoring Organisation.
- Commander Joe Reginald Blake, R.N. (Retd). For services to the SS Great Britain Project.
- James Nigel Boal, Senior Vice-President and Treasurer, The Boys' Brigade, Northern Ireland.
- Miss Margaret Main Bochel. For services to the community in Nairn, Scotland.
- Lieutenant Colonel Derek John Bottomley (Retd.), Retired Officer II, Ministry of Defence.
- George Edward Bramley, Managing Director, Radial Remoulds (Corby) Ltd.
- Miss Mildred Edith Elizabeth Brett, lately Senior State Enrolled Nurse, Wallingford Community Hospital, Oxfordshire Health Authority.
- Arthur Henry Broadhurst, Chairman, South Staffordshire Committee for the Employment of Disabled People.
- Miss Marie-Cecile Mauricienne Brochon, District Nurse/Midwife, Ottery St. Mary Hospital, Exeter Health Authority.
- Albert John Bromfield. For services to the Officers' Association, Royal British Legion.
- Edward Thomas Brown, Parks Manager, Castlereagh Borough Council.
- Thomas Musselbrook Bruce, Chief Ambulance Officer, Fife, Lothian and Borders Area.
- Albert Clifford Bryer. For services to the community in Llandeilo and district.
- Major Michael Lawrence Joseph Burke (Retd.), Secretary, Canada, Gurkha Welfare Appeal.
- Doris, Mrs. Burton. For services to the community in Middleton, Manchester.
- Peter Wightwick Burton, M.C., Industrial Development Officer, Calderdale Metropolitan Borough Council.
- George Calvert, lately Administrative Officer, West Yorkshire Metropolitan County Council.
- Margaret Jean, Mrs. Carey, lately Headmistress, Woodlands School, Chelmsford.
- George Herbert Carnall. For services to the community in Trafford, Manchester.
- Miss Patricia Eileen Carroll, Senior Personnel Officer (Medical Manpower), North West Thames Regional Health Authority.
- Leonard Benjamin Carter. For services to the Royal British Legion in Cambridgeshire.
- Miss Norah Cash, lately Secretary, London Philharmonic Choir.
- James George Chalk, Executive Engineer, Inland Division, London Region, British Telecom.
- Sidney Frank Clapham, General Secretary, National Union of Footwear, Leather and Allied Trades.
- Miss Joyce Clarke, lately Senior Administrative Officer, Education Welfare Service, Inner Lon- don Education Authority.
- Prudence Elaine, Mrs. Clench, lately Chairman, Dorothy House Foundation, Bath.
- James Edward Coffee, Warden, Woodrow High House Conference Centre, London Federation of Boys' Clubs.
- Miss Audrey Lilian Coleman, General Administrative Officer, General Nursing Council of England and Wales.
- Miss Amelia Winifred Collins. For services to the Girl Guide Association.
- William Patrick Collins, Executive Officer, Department of Health and Social Security.
- James Henry Conroy, Higher Executive Officer, Department of Employment.
- Ronald Frederick Cook, Environmental Manager, United Glass Containers PLC.
- Miss Grace Mildred Cooper, Station Secretary, Norfolk Agricultural Station.
- Joan Mary, Mrs. Cossins, Executive Officer, Lord Chancellor's Department.
- Peter Campbell Crook, Surveyor, Board of Customs and Excise.
- Russell Hugh Crowle, County Secretary, Devon, National Farmers' Union.
- William Dale, Higher Executive Officer, Department of Employment.
- George Thomas Davies, Executive Officer, Department of Transport.
- Lawrence Charles Deane, Chief Welfare Officer, South East Postal Region, The Post Office.
- Peter Deans, Development Executive Engineer (First), Borders District, South of Scotland Electricity Board.
- George Edwin Dennerly, lately Scientific Officer, Ministry of Defence.
- Peter Devlin, Assistant Officer, Board of Customs and Excise.
- Miss Delphine Mary Dickson, Chairman, East Anglian Area, National Association of Citizens' Advice Bureaux.
- John George Dony. For services to natural his- tory and to conservation in Luton and district.
- Brenda, Mrs. Douglas. For Political and Public Service.
- Stanley Alfred Douglas, Executive Officer, Paymaster General's Office.
- Thomas Draper, Senior Divisional Officer, Lincolnshire Fire Brigade.
- Frederick William Duxberry, Senior Executive Officer, Board of Inland Revenue.
- Stanley Senior Dyson, Clerical Officer, Department of Health and Social Security.
- James Graham Eakin, lately Safety Officer, Northern Ireland Railways Ltd.
- Miss Joan Trueman Eastman, Volunteers' Organiser, Bristol Stroke Support Group, Avon.
- Diana Cook, Mrs. Edwardes, Head of English Department, Tunbridge Wells Grammar School for Girls.
- Edwin Roy Latham Edwards, Senior Executive, Brick Development Association.
- Verona Mardlin, Mrs. Elder. For services to Athletics.
- Charles Standish Elliott. For services to Cricket.
- Christine, Mrs. Ellis, Area Organiser, London South East Area, Bromley, Women's Royal Voluntary Service.
- Tom Ralph Ellson, lately Assistant Director of Operations (Services), Southern Water Authority.
- Alfred Entwistle, Superintendent, Royal Ulster Constabulary.
- David Hamilton Evans. For services to local government in Dinefwr.
- Kenneth Gronw Evans, Chief Superintendent, Metropolitan Police.
- Marian Davies, Mrs. Evans, Teacher, St. Dials Infants School, Cwmbran.
- Cecile Ada Anne, Mrs. Everard, County Nursing Officer, St. John Ambulance Brigade, Jersey.
- Keith Roland Farlow, Chief Superintendent, Royal Ulster Constabulary.
- Jean Margaret, Mrs. Fernandez. For Political and Public Service.
- Annie, Mrs. Finch. For services to the community in Cleveland.
- Joan, Mrs. Maule-Ffinch, Organiser, Lichfield Citizens' Advice Bureau.
- George Bernard Fisher. For services to Mountain Rescue in Cumbria.
- Hildred Fisher, Treasurer, No. 148 Squadron Civilian Committee, Barnsley, Air Training Corps.
- Alexander Munroe Fleming. For services to the Boys' Brigade in Scotland.
- The Reverend Brother Peter Matthew Fogarty, Teacher, St. Aidan's Roman Catholic School, Sunderland.
- Miss Elizabeth Wilson Fordyce. For Political Service.
- Lauretta, Mrs. Forsythe, Staff Officer, Department of the Environment, Northern Ireland.
- Vincent Foulkes, lately Executive Officer, Department of Health and Social Security.
- Neil Fox. For services to Rugby League Football.
- Richard Hartas Foxton, General Medical Practitioner and Police Surgeon, Scunthorpe.
- Miss Dora Irene Frost, District Personnel Nurse, Bath Health Authority.
- Alexander David Liddell Gardiner, Observer Lieutenant Commander, Deputy Group Commandant, Inverness Group, Royal Observer Corps.
- Ronald Gibbs, Assistant Secretary, Wessex Water Authority.
- Miss Audrey Gill. For Political Service.
- Kenneth Gill, District Commissioner, Isle of Wight Branch, Pony Club.
- William Gladwin, Commercial Executive, Hatfield Division, Dynamics Group, British Aerospace PLC. For services to Export.
- Miss Evelyn Laura Glendenning, Executive Officer, Department of Transport.
- The Honourable Pamela Muriel Dorine, Mrs. Goodale. For Political and Public Service.
- Ronald James Goodchild, Senior Assistant Engineer, Reading Borough Transport.
- Eddie Gray. For services to Association Football.
- George Brenthal Greaves, Principal Community Relations Officer, Lambeth.
- Donald Henry Gresswell, Vice-President, Conservation Group, The Chiltern Society.
- James Grieve, Member, Annandale and Eskdale District Council.
- Edward Roy Griffiths, Managing Director, Lapointe Broach Company. For services to Ex- port.
- Ronald Malcolm Griffiths, General Medical Practitioner, London E.6.
- Miss Betty Mary Haines, Head, Biology and Protein Sciences, British Leather Manufacturers Research Association.
- Gordon Hall, Chief Safety Officer, Rolls-Royce Ltd. For services to health and safety.
- Miss Pauline Hall, Financial Accounts Controller, Precision Rubbers Division, Dunlop Ltd.
- Sheher Bano, Mrs. Hamid, Head Teacher, Glasgow Language Centre.
- Albert Charles Hampshire, Senior Liaison Probation Officer, Snaresbrook Crown Court.
- Miss Patricia Margaret Hanning, lately Senior Personal Secretary, Royal Greenwich Observatory.
- Harry Harding. For services to the community in Lancashire.
- Beatrice Eugene, Mrs. Harthan, Secretary and Almoner, Sheriffs' and Recorders' Fund, Central Criminal Court.
- Mollie, Mrs. Hayes, School Administrative Officer, Feltham School, London Borough of Hounslow.
- Edward Henry, Chief Superintendent, Royal Ulster Constabulary.
- Miss Mary Elizabeth Wharton Hewison, lately Administrator, Chest Clinic, London Chest Hospital.
- Helen Doris Bessie, Mrs. Platt-Higgins, Deputy Area Organiser, Home Counties, Women's Royal Voluntary Service.
- Joseph William Hoccom, Regional General Manager, Trustee Savings Bank, Birmingham' and the Midlands.
- Henry Graham Hodge, Export Director, Simpson Ready Foods Ltd.
- Albert Hodges, Nursing Officer, St. Lawrence's Hospital, Caterham.
- Charles Frederick Hodges, Teacher of Typing, Worcester College for the Blind.
- Joan Mary, Mrs. Crossley-Holland, Managing Director, Oxford Gallery.
- John Wentworth Holmes. For Political Service.
- Brian Hulme, Inspector, Lancashire Constabulary.
- Pauline Ruth, Mrs. Humphrey, Senior Information Officer, Central Office of Information.
- Miss Mary Elizabeth Irwin. For public services in Northern Ireland.
- Miss Angela Mary Jackson, lately Foreign and Commonwealth Office.
- Sidney Joseph James, Chairman, Wolverhampton and Walsall Committee for the Employment of Disabled People.
- William Thomas Myrddin John. For services to Weightlifting.
- Miss Freda Downing Johns, Personal Assistant, Isle of Wight County Council.
- Miss Irene Mary West Johnson. For Political and Public Service.
- Muriel, Mrs. Johnston, Farmer and Livestock Breeder, Crocketford, Dumfries.
- Douglas Johnstone, General Secretary, North East Children's Society.
- Charles Jones, lately Senior Probation Officer, Greater Manchester Probation Office.
- Hazel Mary, Mrs. Jones. For Political and Public Service.
- Peter Vaughan Jones, Lecturer in Classics, University of Newcastle.
- Walter Jowett, Maintenance Superintendent, Coryton Refinery, Mobil Oil Company Ltd.
- Phyllis Rose, Mrs. Kavanagh, Organiser, Voluntary Communications Service, Brighton.
- Robert Theodore Kemp, Member, Kennet District Council.
- Edith, Mrs. Kennedy, Shorthand Typist, Department of Health and Social Security.
- George Frederick Key, Export Manager, Industrial Products, Berger Paints Division, Berger Jenson and Nicholson Ltd. For services to Export.
- Gordon Brian Killerby, Headmaster, Buttershaw Middle School, Bradford.
- Miss Jane Elisabeth Wentzel Killick, Head, Export Promotion Department, Confederation of British Industry.
- Diana Barbara Vivienne, Mrs. King. For Political and Public Service.
- John Cecil King, Higher Executive Officer, Department of Health and Social Security.
- Barbara Ann, Mrs. Kirkham, Matron, Brudenell County Secondary School, Amersham.
- Maurice Rickards Knight. For services to Journalism in Faversham.
- David Kennedy Lamb, M.C., lately Non-Tech A, Springfields Nuclear Power Development Laboratories.
- John Langhorn, lately Senior Welfare Officer. Ministry of Defence.
- Kenneth Leach, Deputy Clerk to the Justices, Newbury Magistrates' Court.
- James Greenwood Leadley, Chairman, National Federation of Fishermen's Organisations.
- Anthony Lee, Higher Executive Officer, Department of Health and Social Security.
- Donald Oswald Lionel Leveridge, Works Officer, Commonwealth War Graves Commission.
- Walter Henry Lewis, B.E.M., Marketing Director, South Wales Area, National Coal Board.
- William Walker Leyland, Regional Secretary, London Metropolitan Region of Young Men's Christian Associations.
- Alfred Emrys Lloyd, Buildings Officer, Thames Valley Police.
- William John Hannah Love, Higher Executive Officer, Department of Employment.
- Donald Lovell, Wine Consultant, IDV (Home Trade) PLC.
- Miss Edna Ruth Lovell. For services to Music in Edinburgh.
- Miss Jean Margaret McClay, Nursing Officer, Health Visiting, Magherafelt and Cookstown District, Northern Health and Social Services Board.
- Georgina Macleod Kennedy, Mrs. Macdonald. For services to the community in Stornoway.
- Doreen, Mrs. McFarlane, Matron, Clippens School, Linwood, Renfrewshire.
- Miss Joan Bernadette McGlennon, Principal Administrative Assistant (Planning), Wandsworth Health Authority.
- George Patrick McGuigan, Member, Northern Health and Social Services Board.
- Miss Helen Todd McIntosh, Area Nursing Officer (Child Health), Greater Glasgow Health Board.
- Donald Colin Mackay, Head Teacher, Craigmuir Primary School, Edinburgh.
- Douglas Alistair Mackay, lately Professional and Technology Officer Grade II, Scottish Home and Health Department.
- Donald Edward McKewan, Senior Executive Officer, Board of Inland Revenue.
- Ian Alistair Macpherson, Controller of Works, East Kilbride Development Corporation.
- Marie Isobel, Mrs. Mair, lately Senior Clinical Medical Officer, Argyll and Clyde Health Board.
- Alastair George Gunn Manson, Chairman and Member, BSI Committees. Standards Liaison Executive, Plessey Assessment Service, The Plessey Company PLC.
- Valerie Palmer, Mrs. Marett, Principal Lecturer in Multiracial Studies, School of Education, Leicester Polytechnic.
- Miss Euphemia Mathers, lately Matron/Housekeeper, Guide Dog Training Centre, Forfar, Angus.
- Miss Daisie Lily Kathleen Matthews. For Political Service.
- John Matthews, Head, Boot and Shoe Making Department, Derwen Training College.
- Miss Betty Meakin, Personal Secretary to Chief Constable, Derbyshire Constabulary.
- John Richard Grainger Meikle, Leader, Taunton Deane Borough Council.
- Kenneth Melling, Director, HAT Group Ltd, Barley Wood.
- Miss Anne Marie Meyer, Secretary and Registrar, The Warburg Institute.
- John Henry Millard, General Manager, Victoria Coach Station PLC.
- Leonard Mills, Secretary, British Amateur Boxing Association.
- Rena, Mrs. Mohon. For services to the community in Co Durham.
- Terence Frank Money, Technical Manager, Optical Division, Avimo Ltd. For Services to Export.
- David Robert Moorcroft. For services to Athletics.
- Jack Moore, Commercial Director, Ruston Diesels Ltd.
- Barbara Jean, Mrs, Morgan, Sister, Mid Wales Hospital, Talgarth.
- Joan, Mrs. Stokes-Morris, Member Melton Borough Council.
- Katherine, Mrs. Morris, Personal Secretary, Home Office.
- Michael Leon Mullender, Senior Scientific Officer, Ministry of Defence.
- Vera Elizabeth, Mrs. Mulligan, Director, Josephine MacAllister-Brew Development Training.
- Duncan Munro, Farmer, Crossbills, Alness, Ross-shire.
- Miss Pearl Brown Murray, Executive Officer, Board of Inland Revenue.
- George Robert Mustoe, Senior Principal Assistant, Comptroller and City Solicitor's Department, Corporation of London.
- Ann, Mrs. Nash. For Political Service.
- William Simpson Newton, Member, Darlington Borough Council.
- Major Robert Andrew Nichol (Retd.), Secretary, Cornwall Industrial Development Association.
- Miss Cecilia O'Boyle, District Manager, Londonderry No. 1 District, Northern Ireland Housing Executive.
- Miss Alice Helena Walker Orr, Superintendent Physiotherapist, Ards Hospital, Newtownards.
- Edward Gwynfor Owen, Higher Executive Officer, Forestry Commission.
- John Owen, Chairman and Managing Director, Newelco (Uskside).
- Miss Kathleen Ann Parken. For services to the community in Wiltshire.
- Dennis Ernest Parker. For Political Service.
- Constance May, Mrs. Parry, Senior Nursing Officer, York Health Authority.
- James Paterson, Chairman, Policy and Resources Committee, Cumnock and Doon Valley District Council.
- Edward Payne, Personnel and Training Manager, Linotype and Machinery Ltd., Altrincham.
- Geoffrey Pearson, General Dental Practitioner, Warsop.
- Betty May, Mrs. Penny. For services to charities.
- Mary Doreen, Mrs. Penycate, Member, South Eastern Gas Consumers' Council.
- Miss Muriel Joyce Phillips, Production Director, Wallers Ltd. Health and Social Services Board.
- William Powers. For services to the community in Luton
- Thomas John Edward Price. For services to the Road Transport Industry.
- Idris John William Pugh, lately Chief Administrative Officer, Buckinghamshire Fire Brigade.
- Cyril Broome Purvis, Field Manager, North Construction Industry Training Board.
- John William Ralph, Deputy Principal, Department of Agriculture, Northern Ireland.
- Miss Thelma Barbara Ratcliff, Senior Executive Officer, Ministry of Defence.
- Philip Menzel Ray, Director, Sheffield Council for Voluntary Service.
- Herbert Walter Alfred Riggs, Voluntary Worker, National Cycling Proficiency Scheme in Poole.
- Archibald McDonald Ringland, Higher Executive Officer, Department of Energy.
- Sheila Elizabeth, Mrs. Rinning, Training Organiser, Motorcycle Training Scheme, Edinburgh.
- Richard Alfred Roberts, Chief Inspector, Rotating Machines Division, Quality Assurance, Mather and Platt PLC.
- George Edward Robinson, Head, Department of Mathematics and Computer Studies, Belfast College of Technology.
- Winifred, Mrs. Robinson, Regional Secretary, North West, Abbeyfield Society.
- Horace Eric Root, lately Clerk to the Lord Chief Justice.
- Leslie Rowland, lately Director of Housing Services, Telford Development Corporation.
- Victor Murray Royal, Chief Superintendent/ Senior Police Liaison Officer, Directorate of Telecommunications.
- Harold Anthony Rudgard, Chairman, Central London Energy Manager Group.
- Miss Nina Maud Ruffell, Registrar, Association of Certified Accountants.
- John Ainslie Rush, Superintendent, Lothian and Borders Police.
- James Graham Russell. For Political and Public service.
- Brenda Jeanette, Mrs. Salt, Secretary, Bath Division, Soldiers', Sailors' and Airmen's Families Association.
- William Arthur Joseph Saunders, Development Manager, Harvey Hubbell Ltd.
- Miss Irene Ethel Francis Scawn. For Political and Public Service.
- Mae, Mrs. Seddon. For services to Parish Councils in Lancashire and Merseyside.
- Nadine, Mrs. Senior, Senior Mistress, Harehills Middle School.
- Peter Henry Shaw, Senior Executive Officer, Board of Customs and Excise.
- Edward John Sheldon. For Political and Public Service.
- Miss Rosaleen Bernadette Sherry, Inspector(s), Board of Inland Revenue.
- Margaret Agnes, Mrs. Shields. For services to the Talbot Association in Glasgow.
- Dorothy Lilian, Mrs. Shipcott, Superintendent of Specialist Teleprinter Operators, Department of the Environment
- Anthony Allen Short, lately General Manager, Welcome Hotel, Stratford-Upon-Avon, British Transport Hotels.
- Robert Short, Pipe Major, Hawick Pipe Band. For services to Export.
- Andrew Deveney Sim, Chairman and Managing Director, John J. Lees PLC, Coatbridge.
- Arthur John Simpson, Deputy Managing Director, Travellers Fare, British Rail.
- William Adamson Simpson, Sessional Medical Officer, Royal Ordnance Factory, Chorley.
- Harry Ernest Skelson, Secretary, Leicestershire Yeomanry Comrades Association.
- Dorothy Christian, Mrs. Slater. For Political and Public Service.
- Wendy Mary Francis, Mrs. Leslie-Smith, Vice- Chairman, Glamorgan Association of Local Councils.
- George Smyth, Training Manager, Construction Industry Training Board.
- Major John Montagu Smyth. For services to the community in Hereford and Worcester.
- Peter David Spawforth, Chief Planning Officer, Wakefield City Council-
- Edna May, Mrs. Speed, Head Teacher, Hilary Howorth Nursery School, Chester.
- Sylvia Mary, Mrs. Spencer. For Political Service.
- Miss Muriel Stammers, Senior Executive Officer, Department of the Environment.
- Walter Richard Start, Forestry Manager, Forestry Commission.
- Miss Freda Muriel Stephenson, Executive Officer, Ministry of Agriculture, Fisheries and Food.
- Margaret Enid Crichton, Mrs. Stewart. For services to Archaeology in Scotland-
- Robert Angus Stewart, Member, Borders Health Board.
- William John Stripp, lately Superintendent Radiographer, Royal National Orthopaedic Hospital, London.
- Robert James Sullivan, Group Safety Co-ordinator, Taylor Woodrow Construction.
- Captain Victor Alison Sutton, General Manager and Harbour Master, Harwich Harbour Conservancy Board.
- Maurice Anthony Tayler, Executive Officer, Ministry of Defence.
- Stanley Taylor, Process and General Supervisory Grade " A ", Ministry of Defence.
- Reginald Jack Terry, Development Manager, FPT Industries Ltd. For services to Export.
- Richard Page Thompson, Chairman, Liverpool and Wirral War Pensions Committee.
- Delwin Harold Till, Principal Lecturer, Faculty of Engineering and Science, City of Birmingham Polytechnic-
- Jane, Mrs. Timmins, Chairman, Rights of Way Committee, Midland Area, Ramblers' Association.
- Henry Edward Tompkins, Departmental Superintendent, Department of Biochemistry, University College, London.
- Nancy, Mrs. Tovey. For Political Service.
- Florence, Mrs. Treen. For services to the community, particularly in Gwynedd.
- Peter Clemens Turner, Education Officer, H.M. Prison, Exeter.
- Kenneth James Twaits, Inspector (Engineering), Board of Inland Revenue.
- Cyril Arthur Unwin, Regional Secretary (Midlands and East Coast Region), General, Municipal, Boilermakers and Allied Trade Union.
- George Wagstaff, Director, Wagstaff and Appleton Ltd.
- Percy Walker, lately Higher Executive Officer, Department of Employment.
- Ivor George Walters, Deputy-Chairman, I. G. Lintels Ltd.
- Royston Clarence Warne, Photoprinter Services Manager (C3), Department of Trade.
- Rowena, Mrs. Washbourne, lately Divisional Nursing Officer, Mid Glamorgan Health Authority.
- John Marshall Watson. For services to Motor Racing.
- David Watts, Chief Designer, Jaeger Holdings Ltd. For services to Export.
- Jean Sophia Sutherland, Mrs. Weir, Regional Organiser, Highland Region North, Women's Royal Voluntary Service.
- Peter Michael Wells, lately Higher Executive Officer, Department of Health and Social Security.
- Miss Joan Florence West, Secretary to Deputy Chairman, British Aerospace PLC.
- John Hyde West, T.D., Chairman, Grimsby National Insurance Local Appeal Tribunal.
- Phyllis Dorothy, Mrs. White, Director of Nursing Services (Psychiatry), Wirral Health Authority.
- Gordon Barford Whiting. For Political Service.
- Reginald David Wilderspin. For services to the community in East Surrey.
- Herbert Cecil Wilkinson, Assistant Director, The British Carbonisation Research Association.
- Charles Williams (William Charles Williams), Actor.
- Frank Josiah Williams, District Works Officer, Coventry Health Authority.
- John Williams, Assistant Chief Designer, Lucas Aerospace Ltd.
- Leslie George Williams, Senior Executive Officer, Department of Employment.
- Thomas Edwin Williams, Director, The Gauge and Tool Makers' Association. For services to Export.
- Miss Elizabeth Margaret Wills, lately Chief Home Service Adviser, Wales Region, British Gas Corporation.
- Leonard James Wilmott, Inspector, Board of Inland Revenue.
- Nicholas George Winton. For services to the community in Maidenhead, Berkshire.
- Joseph Francis Witherspoon, Deputy Principal Careers Officer, Leicestershire.
- John Wrench. For services to agriculture.
- Sydney Edward Yates. For services to the community in Shropshire.
- William Yates, D.F.M., lately Higher Executive Officer, Department of Health and Social Security.
- Frank Milne Young, Chief Superintendent, Tayside Police.
- Miss Christine Helen Zochonis, Secretary to the Dean of Westminster.

Diplomatic Service and Overseas List

- Alexander Allen, Head of Registry, U.K. Mission to the U.N., Geneva.
- Edward John Blackmore. For welfare services to children in Zambia.
- Olive Hilda, Mrs. Bloomer. For welfare services to servicemen's families in Malta.
- Peter Henry Bolton, Superintendent, Royal Hong Kong Police Force.
- Miss Evelyn Louise Campbell, lately Personal Secretary, H.M. Embassy, Khartoum.
- William John Carroll. For services to the British community in Oslo.
- David Cassidy. For services to water supply development in Uganda.
- Daphne Carol, Mrs. Chotteau. For services to the British community in Brussels.
- Dr. Angela Rosamund Cooke. For medical and welfare services to the community in Ibadan, Nigeria.
- Richard Arthur Cowley. For services to the British community in Montevideo.
- Wilfred George Creber, Head of Registry, British High Commission, Lagos.
- Richard Joseph Caistor Dobson. For services to British maritime interests in Poland.
- George Edward Eyles, lately Chief Technical Officer, Hong Kong.
- John Benson Ferguson. For public services in Bermuda.
- Captain Jack Harry Foster, Vice-Consul, British Vice-Consulate, Venice.
- Ivor George Heygate Goddard. For services to agricultural development in Jordan.
- The Reverend Edward Celestine Gordon, Prison Chaplain, Gibraltar.
- George Bernard Gordon, Training Officer, Ministry of Development, Tanzania.
- John Keith Haden. For services to British commercial interests in Angola.
- George Hill. For services to agricultural development in the Yemen Arab Republic.
- Jenny Chai-nee, Mrs. Ho Lam, Chief Court Reporter, Judiciary Department, Hong Kong.
- Miss Jean Wilson Cunningham Jack. For services to nursing training in The Yemen Democratic Republic.
- Antony Cory James, lately International Staff, NATO, Brussels.
- Lam Chik-suen. For community services in Hong Kong.
- Lau Chi-yuen. For public services in Hong Kong.
- Christopher Lee, Superintendent of Works, Public Works Department, Montserrat. Mohammad Sadiq Lodhi, Information Officer, H.M. Embassy, Islamabad.
- Kathleen Moyra, Mrs. MacDonald, English Language Officer, British Council, Austria.
- Miss Susan Laing MacKay, lately Vice-Consul, British Vice-Consulate, Ibiza.
- Pauline, Mrs. Mackay, Personal Secretary, British Interests Section, Swiss Embassy, Buenos Aires.
- Timothy Emmanuel McField. For services to education in the Cayman Islands.
- Miss Winifred Mary McLaren, Second Secretary (Consular), British High Commission, New Delhi.
- Olga Aline, Mrs. McCluskey. For services to the British community in New York.
- Henry Collin Miller. For services to the community in Madras.
- Margarett Patricia, Mrs. Mirza. For services to education hi Karachi.
- Elizabeth Morrison, Mrs. Mitchell. For services to the British community in Oregon.
- Captain John Mungo Park. For services to exservicemen in Dublin.
- Alfred Francis Raymond Patron, Vice-Consul, British Consulate-General, Barcelona.
- Miss Janet Brodie Peacock. For services to nursing training in Nigeria.
- William Victor Plumbridge, Commercial Officer, H.M. Embassy, Stockholm.
- Peter Poon Wing-cheung. For public services in Hong Kong.
- Ayoub Mohamed Qasim, Pro-Consul, H.M. Embassy, Jedda.
- William Phillip Ryan, Agricultural Officer, Montserrat.
- Arthur Roy Saunders, lately Head of Invoicing Section, Regional Accounting Centre, H.M. Embassy, Washington.
- Winifred Lucille, Mrs. Schouten. For community services in St. Kitts-Nevis.
- Miss Monica Rowland Smith, Director, British Council, Kumasi, Ghana.
- Paul David Spivey. For welfare services to the community in Kathmandu.
- Miss Pamela Elizabeth Stretch. For nursing and welfare services to children in Bombay.
- Miss Lilian Dorothy Turnbull. For services to education in the British Virgin Islands.
- Diana Theresa Muriel, Mrs. Webster. For services to English language teaching in Finland.
- Mary Lydia, Mrs. Wijkstrom. For services to the British community in Stockholm.
- Cecilia Gertrude, Mrs. Wimbourne. For services to education in Antigua and Barbuda.
- Wong Kan-ho. For public services in Hong Kong.

=== Order of the Companions of Honour (CH) ===
- The Right Honourable Peter Alexander Rupert, Baron Carrington, K.C.M.G., M.C., Secretary of State for Defence, 1970–74. Secretary of State for Foreign and Commonwealth Affairs 1979–82.
- Lucian Freud, Painter.

== Cook Islands ==
=== Order of the British Empire ===
==== Member of the Order of the British Empire (MBE) ====
Civil Division

- Dr Taupuruariki Cowan. For services to medicine and the people of the Cook Islands.

=== British Empire Medal (BEM) ===
Civil Division

- William Robert Hosking JP. For services to agriculture in the Cook Islands.
