= Denis Henry (disambiguation) =

Denis Henry may refer to:

- Sir Denis Henry (1864–1925), Irish lawyer and politician
- Sir Denis Henry (English judge) (1931–2010), English Queen's Counsel and Lord Justice of Appeal
- Denis Henry (cricketer) (1907–1990), English cricketer
- Denis Henry Desty (1923–1994), British scientist and inventor
