= Colin Imray =

Colin Imray may refer to:

- Colin Imray (1909–1998), British colonial policeman involved in the 1948 Accra riots
- Sir Colin Imray (diplomat) (1933–2020), British High Commissioner to Tanzania and Bangladesh
