= Sarah Blagden =

Researcher (ORCID 0000–0001-8783-3491)

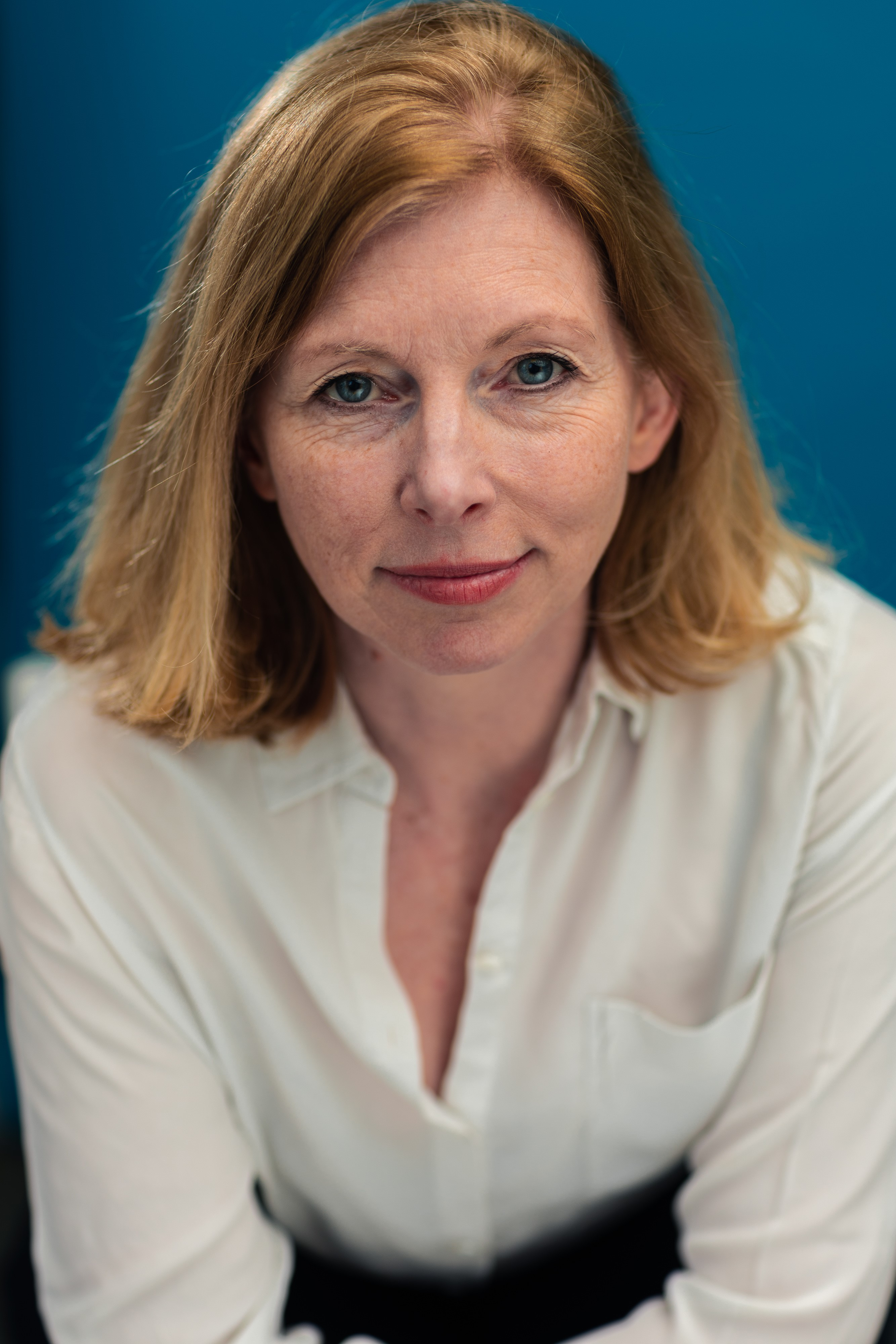
- Photo: Matt Martin, Captis Imagery
- Education: Medical Degree (MBBS), PhD (as CRUK Clinical Fellow)
- Occupation: Professor of Experimental Oncology
- Years active: 2015 - present
- Organisation(s): University of Oxford, Department of Oncology
- Spouse: Stephen Cryan
- Children: Paddy and Lily Cryan

Sarah Blagden is a Professor of Experimental Oncology at the University of Oxford. Her laboratory research is in investigating post-transcriptional mechanisms for ovarian cancer behavior. Her clinical research is in conducting early phase trials in novel cancer therapeutics for people with advanced malignancies.

== Early life and education ==
Sarah Blagden was born in Aldershot, Hampshire in 1969. Her father was Brigadier Patrick Blagden, a renowned mine clearance expert. She was educated in Haslemere in Surrey, and later received a BSc in pharmacology in 1991 and a medical degree (MBBS) at Charing Cross and Westminster Medical School, University of London in 1994.

In 2004, she received a PhD (as CRUK Clinical Fellow) in fruit fly genetics in the laboratory of Professor David Glover at Cambridge University.

== Career ==
After Blagden completed her medical training and subsequent specialist training in Medical Oncology at Addenbrooke's Hospital in Cambridge and the Royal Marsden Hospital, she went on to hold a Clinical Fellowship at the Institute of Cancer Research's Drug Development Unit. She was appointed as Senior Lecturer and Honorary Consultant at Imperial College in 2006, and became a Director of Imperial's Early Cancer Trials Unit. While at Imperial, Blagden established a laboratory studying the dysregulation of mRNA translation in cancer. This group was the first to describe the human gene LARP1 and identify it as an RNA binding protein involved in ovarian cancer.

Blagden was also a chief/principal investigator for a number of national and international clinical studies. She is a Researcher and Professor of Experimental Oncology at the University of Oxford in the department of oncology.

She was a cofounder of the LARP Society, a scientific society dedicated to the study of La-related family of proteins. She serves on the Editorial Board of the British Journal of Cancer. In 2015, Blagden founded Prenostics a company dedicated to researching early cancer biomarkers.

== Awards ==
- CRUK Junior Clinician Scientist PhD fellowship in 1999 at Cambridge University.
- CRUK clinical Fellow PhD in 2004 at Cambridge University.
- Fellowship of Royal College Physicians in 2010.
