= Mary Hedley-Miller =

British civil servant

Dame Mary Elizabeth Hedley-Miller, DCVO, CB (née Ashe; 5 September 1923 – 20 March 2010) was a British civil servant.

Born Mary Elizabeth Ashe on 5 September 1923, she was educated at St Hugh’s College, Oxford, before joining HM Treasury in 1945 as a civil servant. In 1950, she married Roger Hedley-Miller and took his name. She was promoted to under-secretary at the Treasury in 1973 and served there until she moved to the Cabinet Office in 1983 to be Ceremonial Officer. She retired in 1988. She died on 20 March 2010, aged 86.

== Honours ==
She was appointed a Dame Commander of the Royal Victorian Order in the 1989 New Year Honours, having been previously appointed a Companion of the Order of the Bath in 1983.
