= Owen Wade (physician) =

British medical researcher and academic

Professor Owen Wade CBE, FRCP
- Born: Owen Lyndon Wade; 17 May 1921
- Died: 10 December 2008 (aged 87)

Owen Lyndon Wade CBE FRCP (1921-2008) was a British medical researcher and academic, described by the Royal College of Physicians as "one of the founding fathers of clinical pharmacology and therapeutics in the UK".

Wade was born in Penarth, South Wales, on 17 May 1921, to Katie Jones and James Owen David Wade, the latter a surgeon.

He was educated at Emmanuel College, Cambridge and University College, London, and subsequently worked as a clinical assistant at the Pneumoconiosis Research Unit from 1948 to 1951. He was pointed as a lecturer in medicine at the University of Birmingham in 1951, rising to Senior Lecturer. In 1957, he became Whitla Professor of Therapeutics and Pharmacology at Queen's University, Belfast. In 1971 he returned to Birmingham, in the post of Professor of Therapeutics and Clinical Pharmacology, from which he retired in 1986. He was also dean of Birmingham Medical School from 1978 to 1984. Immediately on appointment he had to deal with the aftermath of a smallpox outbreak there. He oversaw the modernisation and 1981 relaunch of the British National Formulary.

Wade's autobiography was published in 1986. He was a Fellow of the Royal College of Physicians (FRCP) and was made a Commander of the Order of the British Empire (CBE) in the 1983 Birthday Honours.

He died on 10 December 2008.

== Bibliography ==
- When I Dropped the Knife. Pentland Press. 1996.
