= Ray Horrocks =

Ray Horrocks CBE
- Born: Raymond Horrocks; January 9, 1930; Bolton, Lancashire
- Died: July 15, 2011 (aged 81)
- Education: Bolton Municipal Secondary School
- Known for: CEO of BL Cars
- Spouse: Pamela Russell

Raymond Horrocks CBE (9 January 1930 - 15 July 2011) was a businessman from Lancashire, and a chief executive of British Leyland (BL) through the turbulent late 1970s and early 1980s.

== Early life ==
He attended Bolton Municipal Secondary School (Bolton County Grammar School from 1947, now known as Bolton St Catherine's Academy).

== Career ==
From 1944-50 he worked in the Lancashire textile industry. From 1948-50 he completed his National Service with the Intelligence Corps.

From 1953-58 he was a merchandiser for M&S.

=== Ford ===
From 1963-72 he worked for Ford of Britain, later becoming a director of Europe and the Middle East (Ford of Europe).

=== British Leyland ===
He joined BL in 1978 being head hunted by the new chairman Michael Edwardes. He was managing director from 1980-81 of BL Cars, becoming chairman and chief executive from 1981-82.

On 1 October 1982, BL was restructured into two main divisions, and from 1982-86 he was group chief executive of BL (Cars). He left BL at the end of April 1986 and was critical of the government's handling of the proposed privatisation.

== Personal life ==
He married Pamela Russell in 1953; they had three daughters. He was awarded the CBE in the 1983 Birthday Honours. He lived in Pangbourne.

Business positions
Preceded by New division	Group Chief Executive of British Leyland (Cars); October 1982 - April 1986	Succeeded by
