= Denis Henry (cricketer) =

English cricketer (1907–1990)

Personal information
- Full name: Denis Philip Henry
- Born: 7 July 1907; Stamford Hill, London, England
- Died: 27 March 1990 (aged 82); Chichester, Sussex, England
- Batting: Right-handed
- Bowling: Right-arm leg break

Career statistics
| Competition | First-class |
|---|---|
| Matches | 1 |
| Runs scored | 1 |
| Batting average | 1.00 |
| 100s/50s | –/– |
| Top score | 1 |
| Balls bowled | 18 |
| Wickets | 0 |
| Bowling average | – |
| 5 wickets in innings | – |
| 10 wickets in match | – |
| Best bowling | – |
| Catches/stumpings | –/– |
- Source: ESPNcricinfo, 25 December 2018

Denis Philip Henry (7 July 1907 – 27 March 1990) was an English cricketer.

Born at Stamford Hill, Henry played a single first-class cricket for the Free Foresters against Oxford University at Oxford in 1948. Batting once in the match, Henry was dismissed for a single run by Basil Robinson. He died at Chichester in March 1990, aged 82.
