= LARP1 =

Protein-coding gene in the species Homo sapiens

Identifiers
- Aliases: LARP1, LARP, La ribonucleoprotein domain family member 1, La ribonucleoprotein 1, translational regulator, Lar1, Lhp1
- External IDs: OMIM: 612059; MGI: 1890165; GeneCards: LARP1
Available structures
PDB	Ortholog search: PDBe RCSB
PDB	List of PDB id codes 4ZC4, 5C0V

Gene location (Human)
Chr.	Chromosome 5 (human)
Band	5q33.2	Start	154,682,986 bp
Band	5q33.2	End	154,817,605 bp

Gene location (Mouse)
Chr.	Chromosome 11 (mouse)
Band	11|11 B1.3	Start	57,899,890 bp
Band	11|11 B1.3	End	57,952,860 bp
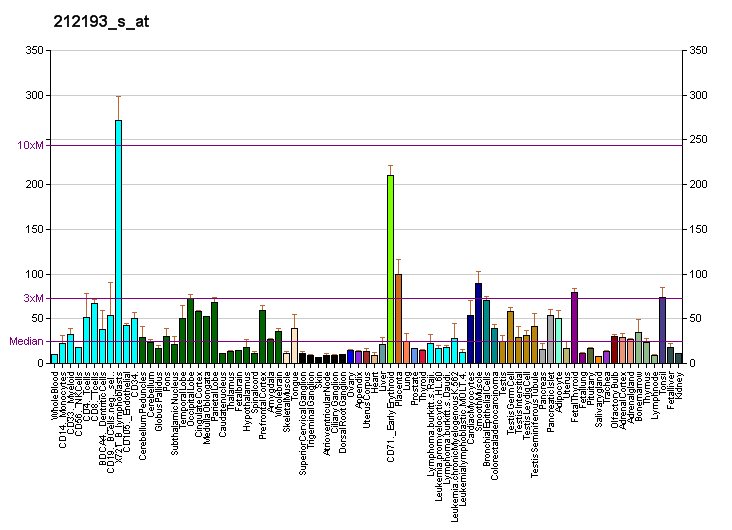

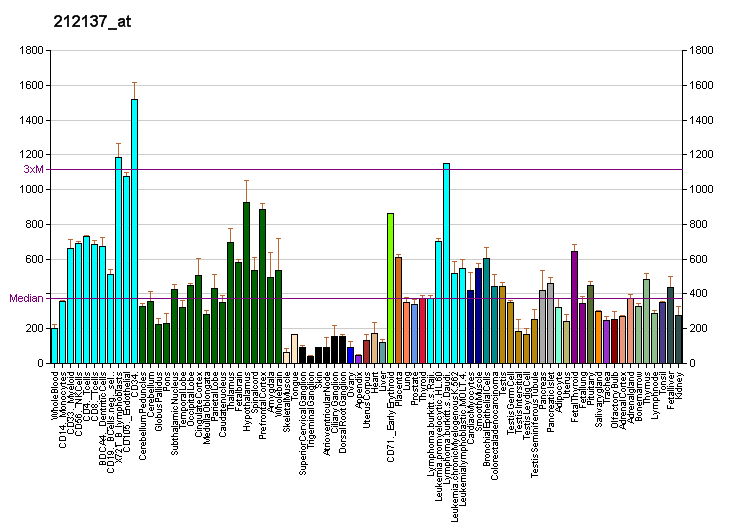

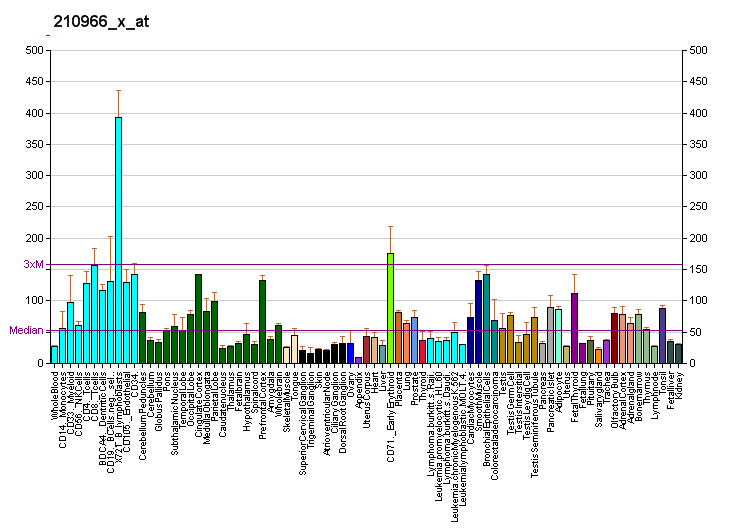
RNA expression pattern
Bgee	Human / Mouse (ortholog); Top expressed in: superior vestibular nucleus; pars reticulata; spinal ganglia; pars compacta; middle temporal gyrus; lateral nuclear group of thalamus; trigeminal ganglion; pylorus; Brodmann area 23; renal medulla / Top expressed in: primitive streak; crypt of lieberkuhn of small intestine; lacrimal gland; fetal liver hematopoietic progenitor cell; epiblast; tail of embryo; trigeminal ganglion; left lobe of liver; entorhinal cortex; somite; More reference expression data
BioGPS	More reference expression data
Gene ontology
Molecular function	RNA cap binding; translation activator activity; translation initiation factor binding; protein binding; eukaryotic initiation factor 4E binding; mRNA 3'-UTR binding; mRNA 5'-UTR binding; RNA binding; cadherin binding; RNA 7-methylguanosine cap binding; ribosomal small subunit binding
Cellular component	cytoplasm; TORC1 complex; membrane; polysome; cytoplasmic stress granule; polysomal ribosome
Biological process	translational initiation; positive regulation of macroautophagy; positive regulation of viral genome replication; cell population proliferation; TOR signaling; protein biosynthesis; positive regulation of translation; negative regulation of translation; TORC1 signaling; mRNA stabilization; cellular response to rapamycin; response to amino acid starvation; regulation of translation; negative regulation of translational initiation
Sources:Amigo / QuickGO
Orthologs
Databases	NCBI: entry; OMA: entry
Species	Human	Mouse
Entrez	23367	73158
Ensembl	ENSG00000155506	ENSMUSG00000037331
UniProt	Q6PKG0	Q6ZQ58
RefSeq (mRNA)	NM_015315; NM_033551; NM_001367713; NM_001367714; NM_001367715 NM_001367716; NM_001367717; NM_001367718; NM_001367719	NM_028451
RefSeq (protein)	NP_056130; NP_001354642; NP_001354643; NP_001354644; NP_001354645 NP_001354646; NP_001354647; NP_001354648; NP_291029	NP_082727
Location (UCSC)	Chr 5: 154.68 – 154.82 Mb	Chr 11: 57.9 – 57.95 Mb
PubMed search
- Wikidata
View/Edit Human	View/Edit Mouse

La-related protein 1 (LARP1) is a 150 kDa protein that in humans is encoded by the LARP1 gene. LARP1 is a novel target of the mammalian target of rapamycin complex 1 (mTORC1) signaling pathway, a circuitry often hyperactivated in cancer which regulates cell growth and proliferation primarily through the regulation of protein synthesis.

== Function ==
LARP1 is the largest of a 7-member family of LARP proteins (others are: LARP1B, LARP3 (a.k.a. genuine La or SSB), LARP4A, LARP4B, LARP6 and LARP7). All LARP proteins, including human LARPs, contain 2 conserved regions. The first conserved region shares homology with La proteins (called the La motif, see SSB) whereas the second conserved region (called the LA- motif) is restricted to LARP proteins. LARP1 and 1B also contain a conserved "DM15 region" within their C-terminus. This region is unique and has been shown to be required for RNA-binding. Mouse Larp1 is expressed in dorsal root ganglia and spinal cord, as well as in developing organs characterized by epithelial-mesenchymal interactions. Human LARP1 is present at low levels in normal, non-embryonic cells but is highly expressed in epithelial cancers (such as ovarian, colorectal, prostate, non-small cell lung, hepatocellular and cervical cancers). Some studies have shown that high levels of LARP1 protein correlate with worse prognosis in cancer patients.

LARP1 binds to and regulates the translation of terminal oligopyrimidine motif (TOP mRNAs) and can directly interact with the 5' cap of mRNAs. It has also been shown to interact with the 3' end and coding regions (CDS) of other genes. LARP1 protein colocalizes with stress granules and P-bodies, which function in RNA storage and degradation. It has been suggested that LARP1 functions in P-bodies to attenuate the abundance of conserved Ras-MAPK mRNAs. The cluster of LARP1 homologs may function to control the expression of key developmental regulators.

Several studies have demonstrated that LARP1 deficiency selectively affects the recruitment of TOP mRNAs to polysomes. In some cancer cells, LARP1 deficiency reduces proliferation and activates apoptotic cell death. Even though a decrease abundance of proteins encoded by TOP mRNAs has been reported in LARP1 silenced cells, some researchers believe that this can be explained simply by the reduced number of TOP mRNA transcripts in LARP1-deficient cells.
