= John Moore (civil servant) =

British civil servant

Sir John Michael Moore, KCVO, CB, DSC (2 April 1921 – 20 June 2016) was a British civil servant. Educated at Selwyn College, Cambridge, he served in the Royal Navy during the Second World War. He entered the civil service in 1946 and joined the Ministry of Transport, where he was Joint Principal Private Secretary to the Minister from 1956 to 1959, an Assistant Secretary from 1959 to 1966 and then an Under-Secretary; four years later moved to the Department of the Environment, and then to the Civil Service Department in 1972 as a Deputy Secretary. Between 1978 and 1983, he was the Second Crown Estate Commissioner.

Moore was appointed a Companion of the Order of the Bath in 1974 and a Knight Commander of the Royal Victorian Order in 1983.
