= Frederick John Barritt =

Frederick John Barritt CBE JP

Speaker of the House of Assembly of Bermuda
- In office 1979–1989

Member of the House of Assembly of Bermuda
- In office 1968–1989
- Constituency: Devonshire South

Minister of Marine and Air Services

Minister of Transport

Personal details
- Born: 14 February 1916
- Died: 13 May 2014 (aged 98)
- Party: United Bermuda Party

Frederick John Barritt CBE JP (14 February 1916 - 13 May 2014) was a member of the parliament of Bermuda for the United Bermuda Party for the constituency of Devonshire South. He served as a speaker and deputy speaker of the House of Assembly of Bermuda, minister of transport and minister of marine and air services.

== Early life and education ==
Born in Bermuda in 1916, Barritt received his early education at Woodlands School and later at Saltus Grammar School. He left school at the age of sixteen and began working at the wholesale firm Powell and Company while taking night classes in office skills and shorthand. He was later encouraged to enter political life by Sir Henry Tucker, leader of the United Bermuda Party.

== Early career ==
Before entering politics, Barritt worked in business and became involved in community affairs. His early professional experience included clerical and administrative responsibilities, which helped shape his later career in public service.

== Political career ==
Barritt was elected to the House of Assembly in 1968, representing Devonshire South for the United Bermuda Party. His parliamentary career spanned nearly three decades, during which he served as Member for Transport and later as Minister of Marine and Air Services. He subsequently became Deputy Speaker of the House for three years.

In 1979, Barritt was elected the 51st Speaker of the House of Assembly, a role he held for ten years. Known for his measured and principled approach, he occasionally broke with the party line when he disagreed on matters of principle. While serving on the board of Bermuda General Theatres, he opposed the segregation of cinemas.

== Later life and community involvement ==
In his later years, Barritt remained involved in civic and charitable initiatives. He served as the first honorary director of Project Action, an organisation that provides free island-wide transportation for seniors and individuals with physical disabilities. Drawing on his extensive experience and community ties, he supported the group’s outreach efforts, attended corporate presentations, and helped establish connections with donors and supporters.

Barritt served as a director of Bermuda Press Holdings and was a lay reader in the Anglican Church. He was also a trustee of the Willowbank Foundation.

== Personal life ==
Barritt married Hilary Pantry in 1944, and the couple had four children: Jennifer, John, Mark and Martha-Jane. His wife died in 2006. He lived with Alzheimer’s disease during his later years.

== Death ==
Frederick John Barritt died on 13 May 2014 at the age of 98.

== Reputation and tributes ==
Following Barritt’s passing, community organisations paid tribute to his decades of public service. Project Action described him as a humble and generous figure whose guidance and experience benefitted the organisation throughout the 1990s. Acting Governor Ginny Ferson also extended condolences, noting that Barritt was widely regarded as a gracious and fair man who devoted many years to serving Bermuda.

Premier Craig Cannonier characterised him as "a community servant in every sense", noting his attentiveness to constituents and his calm leadership as Speaker of the House. Members of both the United Bermuda Party and the Progressive Labour Party also recognised his even-tempered approach and his ability to maintain order during often contentious debates.

Tributes also came from the One Bermuda Alliance, whose chairman highlighted Barritt’s long-standing reputation as one of the most respected members of the United Bermuda Party.
