= Paddy Blagden =

British Army officer (1935–2020)

Brigadier Patrick Martin Blagden CBE (15 March 1935 – 17 December 2020) was a British Army officer and was the United Nations' foremost expert on de-mining at UNMAS. Paddy Blagden spent nearly 35 years in the British Army, of which the last 9 years were spent in Research and Development, operational needs for special equipment and the purchasing of equipment.

== Career ==
Born 15 March 1935, he was the son of another British Army Brigadier, William Blagden. He was educated at Charterhouse School, then the Royal Military Academy Sandhurst. Blagden was commissioned into the Royal Engineers in 1955.

He was promoted to lieutenant in 1957, captain in 1961, major in 1967, lieutenant-colonel in 1975, colonel in 1980 and brigadier in 1984. He retired in 1988. In May 1988 he joined the engineering staff of Royal Ordnance plc, part of British Aerospace.

In September 1991, he was sent to direct the Royal Ordnance mine clearance and EOD contract in the Gulf, which he managed until the end of the mine clearance phase. In July 1992 he was appointed Project Manager of a Royal Ordnance weapons system, but in August 1992 he was recruited by the UN to set up their mine clearance office, which later became UNMAS.

He ran the UN de-mining office until August 1995, when he left to become a freelance consultant for the World Bank, the ICRC, the EU (including assistance to the JRC and the writing of contracts for clearance of a minefield in Zimbabwe), and a number of other agencies including the Japanese and Swiss Governments.

In 1994, he wrote "Anti-Personnel Landmines: Friend or Foe? A Study of the Military Use and Effectiveness of Anti-Personnel Mines". The report commissioned by the ICRC looked at the use and effectiveness of the weapons through a 55-year span.

In September 1998 he was invited by the Swiss government to assist in the formation of the GICHD, and then to act as its Technical Director, a post he continued to hold until 2011, when he retired to become a local Conservative councillor.

Blagden served as Mayor of Farnham in Surrey for the municipal year 2013–2014.

He married Ann Bradbury in 1961 and they had three daughters: Katharine Brazier (wife of the former Conservative MP Julian Brazier), Anna Birch and Sarah Blagden (oncologist).

He died 17 December 2020.
