= Colin Imray (diplomat) =

British diplomat (1933–2020)

Sir Colin Imray
- Born: Colin Henry Imray; 21 September 1933
- Died: 20 December 2020 (aged 87)
- Education: Balliol College, Oxford
- Occupation: Diplomat

Sir Colin Henry Imray KBE CMG (21 September 1933 – 20 December 2020) was a British diplomat who was High Commissioner to Tanzania and Bangladesh.

== Biography ==
Colin Imray was educated at Highgate School, Hotchkiss School, Connecticut, and Balliol College, Oxford.

He served in the Seaforth Highlanders and the Royal West African Frontier Force in Sierra Leone from 1952 to 1954, then joined the Commonwealth Relations Office in 1957. After diplomatic postings in Canberra, Nairobi, and Montreal, he was Consul-General at Islamabad (1973–77), Commercial Counsellor at Tel Aviv (1977–80), Deputy High Commissioner at Bombay (now Mumbai; 1980–84), Assistant Under-Secretary of State at the FCO (1984–85), High Commissioner to Tanzania (1986–89) and High Commissioner to Bangladesh (1989–93). In 1990 he was instrumental in persuading the autocratic Bangladeshi president, Hussain Muhammad Ershad, to resign and enable democratic elections.

Imray was appointed CMG in 1983 and was knighted KBE in 1992.
