= Denis Henry Desty =

Denis Henry Desty (21 October 1923 - 18 January 1994) was a British scientist and inventor, known primarily for his work in the fields of chromatography and combustion science.

Desty twice won the Tswett Medal for Chromatography, in 1974 and 1978, and the Royal Society of Chemistry Award for Combustion Chemistry in 1982.

Desty's contributions to the field of chromatography are remembered to this day by the presentation of an annual Desty Memorial Award for Innovation in Separation Science

== Works ==
- Desty, D. H. Vapour phase chromatography. ([S.l.] : [s.n.], 1957.)
