= Stanley Fordham =

British diplomat (1907–1981)

Sir Stanley Fordham KBE CMG
- Fordham in 1951

British Ambassador to Colombia
- In office 1960–1964
- Preceded by: James Joint
- Succeeded by: Sir Edgar Vaughan

British Ambassador to Cuba
- In office 1956–1960
- Preceded by: Wilfred Hansford Gallienne
- Succeeded by: Sir Herbert Marchant

Personal details
- Born: 2 September 1907
- Died: 6 April 1981 (aged 73)
- Children: 2
- Education: Trinity College, Cambridge
- Occupation: Diplomat

Sir Alfred Stanley Fordham (2 September 1907 – 6 April 1981) was a British diplomat who served as ambassador to Cuba from 1956 to 1960 and ambassador to Colombia from 1960 to 1964.

== Early life, family and education ==
Fordham was born on 2 September 1907, the eldest son of Alfred Russell Fordham and Caroline Augusta Stanley. He was educated at Eton College and Trinity College, Cambridge.

== Career ==
Fordham joined the Consular Service as a probationer vice-consul in 1930, and served at San Francisco from 1930 to 1933; Lima from 1933 to 1936; Guatemala from 1936 to 1943, where he was promoted to second secretary; and Los Angeles from 1943 to 1944. In 1944, he was promoted to first secretary while serving at San Salvador before he was transferred to St Louis the following year.

In 1948, he was transferred to the Foreign Office, promoted to counsellor, and in the following year made head of the American department. He then served at Warsaw from 1951 until 1952 when he was posted to Stockholm. From 1954 to 1956, he was minister at Buenos Aires. He then served as ambassador to Cuba from 1956 to 1960 during the Cuban Revolution when, according to The Times, "While other Ambassadors were resigning or being recalled in the months after Fidel Castro's rise, Fordham on all accounts achieved a remarkable increase in British standing." He was then ambassador to Colombia from 1960 to 1964.

After retiring from the service in 1964, he became a JP in 1966, and served as High Sheriff of Cambridgeshire and Isle of Ely from 1973 to 1974, and then HM Lord Lieutenant of Cambridgeshire from 1975 to 1977.

== Personal life and demise ==
Fordham married Isabel Ward in 1934, a member of a prominent Peruvian family of British heritage. They had a daughter and a son.

Fordham died at age 73 on 6 April 1981.

== Honours ==
Fordham was appointed Companion of the Order of St Michael and St George (CMG) in the 1951 New Year Honours and Knight Commander of the Order of the British Empire (KBE) in the 1964 New Year Honours.

== See also ==
- Cuba–United Kingdom relations
- Colombia–United Kingdom relations

Diplomatic posts
Preceded by Wilfred Hansford Gallienne	British Ambassador to Cuba; 1956–1960	Succeeded by Sir Herbert Marchant
Preceded by James Joint	British Ambassador to Colombia; 1960–1964	Succeeded by Sir Edgar Vaughan
