= Stephen Leech =

British diplomat (1864–1925)

Sir Stephen Leech KCMG

British Envoy Extraordinary and Minister Plenipotentiary to the Republic of Cuba
- In office 1909–1919
- Preceded by: Arthur Grant Duff
- Succeeded by: William Erskine

British Minister Plenipotentiary to the Republic of Hayti
- In office 1913–1919
- Preceded by: Arthur Nightingale
- Succeeded by: William Erskine

British Minister Plenipotentiary to the Dominican Republic
- In office 1913–1916
- Preceded by: Major Robert Stuart
- Succeeded by: William Erskine

Personal details
- Born: 8 July 1864
- Died: 12 May 1925 (aged 60) Lyndhurst, Hampshire
- Education: Magdalen College, Oxford
- Occupation: Diplomat

Sir Stephen Leech (8 July 1864 – 12 May 1925) was a British diplomat who was minister plenipotentiary to Cuba, Haiti and the Dominican Republic.

== Early life and education ==
Leech was born on 8 July 1864, the second son of John Leech of Gorse Hall, Dukinfield, Cheshire. He went Eton College in 1878, and in 1883 to Magdalen College, Oxford.

== Career ==
Leech entered the Diplomatic Service as an attaché in 1888, and his first posting was to Berlin. Two years later, he was promoted to third secretary; in 1894 to second secretary; and served successively at Brussels, Copenhagen, Constantinople, Lisbon and Rome. In 1904, he was returned to Copenhagen as first secretary, and in the following year, served in a similar position in Chistiania. In 1907, after promotion to counsellor, he was posted to Peking, a post he held until 1909.

In 1909, he was appointed minister resident to the Republic of Cuba and consul-general, and in 1912, envoy extraordinary and minister plenipotentiary, a post he held until 1919. He was also accredited as minister plenipotentiary to the Dominican Republic from 1913 to 1916, and to Haiti from 1913 to 1919.

Leech retired in 1920, and died on 12 May 1925 at Lyndhurst, Hampshire, aged 60.

== Honours ==
Leech was appointed Knight Commander of the Order of St Michael and St George (KCMG) in the 1919 Birthday Honours.

== See also ==
- Cuba–United Kingdom relations
- Haiti–United Kingdom relations
- Dominican Republic–United Kingdom relations

Diplomatic posts
Preceded by Arthur Grant Duff	British Envoy Extraordinary and Minister Plenipotentiary to the Republic of Cuba; 1909–1919	Succeeded by William Erskine
Preceded by William Erskine	British Minister Plenipotentiary to the Republic of Hayti; 1913–1919	Succeeded by William Erskine
Preceded by Major Robert Stuart	British Minister Plenipotentiary to the Dominican Republic; 1913–1916	Succeeded by William Erskine
