= Charles des Graz =

British diplomat (1860–1940)

Sir Charles des Graz KCMG

British Ambassador to Serbia
- In office 1914–1919
- Preceded by: Sir Ralph Paget
- Succeeded by: Sir Alban Young

British Minister to Peru
- In office 1908–1913
- Preceded by: William Beauclerk
- Succeeded by: Ernest Rennie

Personal details
- Born: 2 March 1860
- Died: 22 October 1940 (aged 80) Wimbledon, London
- Education: Trinity College, Cambridge
- Occupation: Diplomat

Sir Charles Louis des Graz (2 March 1860 – 22 October 1940) was a British diplomat who served as minister to Peru from 1908 to 1913 and ambassador to Serbia from 1914 to 1919.

== Biography ==
Des Graz was born on 2 March 1860. He was educated at Harrow School and Trinity College, Cambridge.

Des Graz joined the Diplomatic Service as an attaché in 1884 and in the following year was sent to Constantinople. In 1886, after he was promoted to third secretary, he was posted to Athens, and in 1891, went to The Hague as second secretary. In 1894, he was transferred to St Petersburg. In 1901, he was sent to Tehran as secretary of the Legation before he returned to Athens in 1903. In 1905, he was promoted to counsellor and was posted to Rome. In 1908, he was appointed envoy extraordinary and minister plenipotentiary to the Republics of Bolivia, Ecuador, and Peru, and consul-general. A separate Legation was established in Bolivia in 1910.

On 3 February 1914, he was transferred to Belgrade as envoy extraordinary and minister plenipotentiary to Serbia. On the outbreak of hostilities with Austria-Hungary, the Serbian government abandoned Belgrade and moved to Nish where des Graz spent the first 15 months of the War. According to The Times, "With the heroic Serbian Army he went through all the hardships of the retreat in the winter of 1915-16 over the Albanian mountains...and was the life and soul of his party of fugitives, his unfailing cheerfulness and ready wit imparting gaiety to all around him, and often relieving the horrors of that memorable exodus." He joined the Serbian government in exile in Corfu in 1917 and 1918, and returned to Belgrade after the War where he remained for over a year. On the establishment of the Kingdom of Serbs, Croats and Slovenes in December 1918 he was briefly re-accredited before he retired from the service in 1919.

Des Graz died on 22 October 1940 at Wimbledon, London, aged 80.

== Honours ==
Des Graz was appointed Knight Commander of the Order of St Michael and St George (KCMG) in the 1915 Birthday Honours.

== See also ==
- Peru–United Kingdom relations
- Serbia–United Kingdom relations

Diplomatic posts
Preceded by William Beauclerk	British Minister to Peru; 1908–1913	Succeeded by Ernest Rennie
Preceded by Sir Ralph Paget	British Ambassador to Serbia; 1914–1919	Succeeded by Sir Alban Young
