= John Barnes (diplomat) =

British diplomat (1917–1992)

Sir John Barnes KCMG MBE

British Ambassador to the Netherlands
- In office 1972–1979
- Preceded by: Sir Richard Sykes
- Succeeded by: Sir Alexander Clutterbuck

British Ambassador to Israel
- In office 1969–1972
- Preceded by: Sir Michael Hadow
- Succeeded by: Sir Bernard Ledwidge

Personal details
- Born: 22 June 1917
- Died: 11 June 1992 (aged 74)
- Children: 5
- Education: Trinity College, Cambridge
- Occupation: Civil servant and Diplomat

Sir Ernest John Ward Barnes (22 June 1917 – 11 June 1992) was a British civil servant and diplomat. He served as British Ambassador to Israel from 1969 to 1972 and British Ambassador to the Netherlands from 1972 to 1977.

== Early life and education ==
Barnes was born on 22 June 1917, the eldest son of Rt Rev Ernest William Barnes, 3rd Bishop of Birmingham, and Adelaide née Ward, daughter of Sir Adolphus Ward, master of Peterhouse, Cambridge and historian. He was educated at Dragon School, Oxford; Winchester College; and Trinity College, Cambridge where he took a starred double first in classics.

== Career ==
On the outbreak of World War II, Barnes joined the Royal Artillery, serving from 1939 to 1946, and rose to lieutenant-colonel. In 1946, he was awarded the MBE for military service and the US Bronze Star Medal.

In 1946, Barnes entered the Foreign Service. He served in Washington, Beirut, and Bonn. He was then sent on a year's sabbatical to Harvard University at the Center for International Affairs. From 1962 to 1969, he was head of the Western Organisations Department at the Foreign Office. He then served as Ambassador to Israel from 1969 to 1972, when he maintained a good relationship with Golda Meir's government, and as Ambassador to the Netherlands from 1972 to 1977.

Following his retirement from the diplomatic service, Barnes took up directorships at Alliance Investment Co and Whiteaway Laidlaw. He served as chairman of Sussex Rural Community Council; vice-chairman of Sussex University; and governor of Hurstpierpoint College. He was a member of Chichester Diocesan Synod. In 1979, he published Ahead Of His Age: Bishop Barnes Of Birmingham, a biography of his father.

== Personal life and death ==
Barnes married Cynthia Margaret Ray née Stewart, daughter of Sir Herbert Stewart, an authority on Indian agriculture, in 1948 and they had two sons and three daughters.

Barnes died on 11 June 1992, aged 74.

== Honours ==
Barnes was appointed Knight Commander of the Order of St Michael and St George (KCMG) in the 1974 New Years Honours. In 1946, he was appointed Member of the Order of the British Empire (Military) (MBE), and awarded the US Bronze Star Medal.

== See also ==
- Israel–United Kingdom relations
- Netherlands–United Kingdom relations

Diplomatic posts
Preceded by Sir Michael Hadow	British Ambassador to Israel; 1969–1972	Succeeded by Sir Bernard Ledwidge
Preceded by Sir Richard Sykes	British Ambassador to the Netherlands; 1972–1979	Succeeded by Sir Alexander Clutterbuck
