= Nicolas Cheetham =

British diplomat and writer

- Portrait by Walter Bird, 1964

British Ambassador to Mexico
- In office 1964–1968

British Ambassador to Hungary
- In office 1959–1961

Personal details
- Born: 8 October 1910
- Died: 14 January 2002 (aged 91)
- Spouse(s): Jean Corfe (1936-?) Mabel Jocelyn (m. 1960)
- Children: 2, including Anthony
- Parent: Milne Cheetham (father)
- Education: Christ Church, Oxford

Sir Nicolas John Alexander Cheetham KCMG (8 October 1910 – 14 January 2002) was a British diplomat and writer.

== Career ==
Cheetham was the son of Sir Milne Cheetham, also a diplomat, and was educated at Eton College and Christ Church, Oxford. He entered the Diplomatic Service in 1934 and served at Athens, Buenos Aires, Mexico City and Vienna.

In 1948 Cheetham, in charge of the Allied Control Commission in Vienna, attended a meeting of the Anglo-Russian Society to commemorate the 30th anniversary of the Red Army. The Soviet commander-in-chief, General Vladimir Kurasov, made a speech claiming that Britain and the USA had helped Hitler to prepare for war against the Soviet Union, and were plotting a war themselves. Cheetham and the American envoy, Sidney Mellon, got up and walked out. Afterwards, in answer to a question in the House of Commons, the Foreign Secretary, Ernest Bevin, said that the Government fully endorsed Cheetham's action. (Cheetham's obituary in The Daily Telegraph recalled that "he attracted attention with another walkout from a party, when President Nkrumah of Ghana called Britain 'a colonialist oppressor'.")

Cheetham was Minister to Hungary 1959–61, Assistant Under-Secretary at the Foreign Office 1961–64, and Ambassador to Mexico 1964–68.

After retiring from the Diplomatic Service, Cheetham wrote historical books.

== Family ==
In 1936, he married Jean Evison Corfe, daughter of Lt.-Col. Arthur Cecil Corfe. They had two sons (one of whom is publisher Anthony Cheetham). After a divorce, Cheetham married in 1960 Lady Mabel Kathleen Jocelyn (1915–1985), daughter of the 8th Earl of Roden and former wife of Sir Richard Brooke, 10th Baronet (who himself remarried Cheetham's former wife).

== Honours ==
Cheetham was appointed CMG in the New Year Honours of 1953 and knighted KCMG in the Queen's Birthday Honours of 1964.

== Publications ==
- A History of Mexico, Hart-Davis, London, 1970. ISBN 0246640065
- Mexico: A Short History, Crowell, New York, 1971. ISBN 0690533896
- New Spain: the birth of modern Mexico, Gollancz, London, 1974. ISBN 0575013796
- Mediaeval Greece, Yale University Press, 1981. ISBN 0300024215
- Keepers of the Keys: the Pope in history, Macdonald, London, 1982. ISBN 0356085848
- A history of the popes, Dorset Press, 1992. ISBN 0880297468

Diplomatic posts
Preceded by Sir Leslie Fry	Envoy Extraordinary and Minister Plenipotentiary at Budapest; 1959–1961	Succeeded by Sir Ivor Pink
Preceded by Sir Peter Garran	Ambassador Extraordinary and Plenipotentiary at Mexico City; 1964–1968	Succeeded by Sir Peter Hope
