= J. J. Broderick =

British diplomat (1882–1933)

Sir John Joyce Broderick KCMG
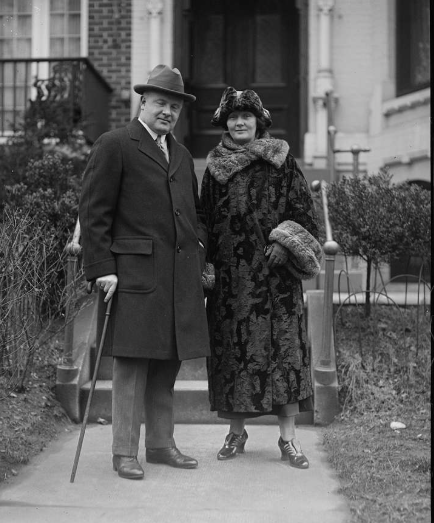
- Broderick and his wife in 1923

British Minister to Cuba
- In office 1931–1933
- Preceded by: Thomas Morris
- Succeeded by: Herbert Grant Watson

Personal details
- Born: 24 April 1882
- Died: 2 June 1933 (aged 51)
- Children: 3
- Education: Royal University of Ireland
- Occupation: Diplomat

Sir John Joyce Broderick (24 April 1882 – 2 June 1933) was a British diplomat.

== Early life and education ==
Broderick was born on 24 April 1882 in Ireland. He was the youngest son of Michael Broderick of Galway. He was educated at Blackrock College, Dublin and Royal University of Ireland.

== Career ==
Broderick entered the Consular Service in 1908 after spending seven years working in various capacities at HM Customs Service. He was appointed to New York in 1909 and served on three occasions as acting Consul General, before he was commissioned as Vice-Consul in 1912. After four years in the United States, he was at Amsterdam as Consul and then acting Consul-General at Rotterdam from 1913 to 1915.

Broderick returned to the United States in 1915 and served at the British Embassy (commercial section) in Washington as assistant Commercial Adviser from 1915 to 1919. He was Commercial Secretary from 1919 to 1920, and then promoted to Commercial Counsellor and remained in the post from 1920 to 1931. During his long service in the United States he gained wide knowledge of business and finance. According to the Times, "Broderick's whole career showed that he had acquired a mastery of those technical questions of commerce and tariffs with which diplomacy is now chiefly concerned." As Commercial Counsellor, he was the chief negotiator in War claims made by the United States Government against the British Government. After a successful settlement was reached in 1927, later that year Broderick received a knighthood.

Broderick served as Minister Plenipotentiary to Cuba—a post which was later redesignated as Ambassador—and as Consul-General between 1931 and 1933. In January 1933, it was announced that Broderick would succeed Sir Ronald Macleay as Ambassador to Argentina in Buenos Aires. This was the first occasion that a member of the Commercial Diplomatic Service had been promoted to the rank of Ambassador. However, in June that year he died while on leave in London before taking office.

== Personal life and death ==
Broderick married Marjorie Kelly in 1909 and they had two sons and a daughter. He was a member of the Maryland Academy of Science and the New York Academy of Political Science.

Broderick died on 2 June 1933, aged 51.

== Honours ==
Broderick was appointed Companion of the Order of St Michael and St George (CMG) in the 1925 Birthday Honours, and promoted to Knight Commander (KCMG) in the 1927 Birthday Honours.

== See also ==
- Cuba–United Kingdom relations

Diplomatic posts
Preceded by Thomas Morris	British Minister to Cuba; 1931–1933	Succeeded by Herbert Grant Watson
