= The Real Fidel Castro =

2003 biography by Leycester Coltman

- The first edition cover of the book.
- Author: Leycester Coltman
- Language: English
- Subject: Biography
- Publisher: Yale University Press
- Publication date: 2003
- Publication place: United States
- Media type: Print (Hardcover & Paperback)

The Real Fidel Castro is a biography of the Cuban revolutionary and politician Fidel Castro, written by the British diplomat Sir Leycester Coltman (1938–2002) and first published by Yale University Press in 2003. A diplomat for the government of the United Kingdom, Coltman had been appointed to the position of British ambassador to Cuba from 1991 through to 1994, during which time he got to know Castro personally. He died shortly before his biography's publication.

The biography looks at Castro's life from its beginning up until the start of the 21st century, when Castro was in his final years of the presidency, a position that he would relinquish in 2008. The book is accompanied by anecdotes about Castro and his relationship with other politicians, supplied by Coltman from his years in the diplomatic service.

The Real Fidel Castro was reviewed in the mainstream press in both the United Kingdom and United States.

== Reception ==
=== U.K. press reviews ===
"From [Coltman's account], Castro emerges more as a liberal utopian of the 19th century than a 20th-century totalitarian, a Garibaldi more than a Joseph Stalin. [The Real Fidel Castro] explain[s] why the heart of "old Europe" still beats in sympathy with Fidel. He remains a figure from all our yesterdays, grey-bearded but eternally youthful, a man who effortlessly changed his slogan from "Socialism or death", suitable for the violent 20th century, to the more emollient "A better world is possible", appropriate for the more pacifistic revolutionaries of the present era."

— Richard Gott, in the New Statesman

In a review published in the British magazine New Statesman, the journalist and historian Richard Gott noted that Coltman "has a good eye for detail and the telling anecdote" but at the same time, Gott felt that he "devotes rather too much space to Castro's early life, galloping though the 1990s about which his personal experience and insights might have been better deployed at greater length." Believing that the "stock-in-trade" of diplomats like Coltman was gossip, Gott felt that Coltman's work "repeats more stories about the love-lives of senior revolutionaries than I found interesting". Gott went on to compare Coltman's biography with one published around the same time, written by the German reporter Volker Skierka; he notes that "For the first time, we now have two full-length studies of the Cuban leader that reflect a European view. It makes a salutary change, and both diplomat and reporter have original things to say. Coltman's book is more measured, Skierka's more timely, yet neither strays far outside their specialist expertise."
