= Groult =

Groult is a surname. Notable people with the surname include:

- André Groult (1884–1966), French decorator and designer
- Benoîte Groult (1920–2016), French writer and activist
- Flora Groult (1924–2001), French writer
