= Anthony Cheetham (publisher) =

British publisher (born 1943)

- Born: 12 April 1943 (age 83); Mexico City, Mexico
- Education: Balliol College, Oxford
- Occupation: Publishing executive
- Father: Nicolas Cheetham
- Relatives: Milne Cheetham (grandfather)

Anthony John Valerian Cheetham CBE (born 12 April 1943) is an English book publisher, responsible for establishing several of the UK's major publishing houses, including Century (now an imprint of Penguin Random House UK), Orion, Quercus and Head of Zeus (acquired in 2021 by Bloomsbury).

== Early life and education ==
Anthony Cheetham was born in Mexico City in 1943, one of two sons of Nicolas Cheetham, a British diplomat and writer. His early years were characterised by frequent travel, in no small part due to the diplomatic career of his father. After spending his early childhood in Vienna, Cheetham was educated, like his father, at Eton College. One of his close friends at Eton was Derek Parfit. His adolescence saw him spending time both in Paris and Budapest, before attending Balliol College at the University of Oxford, where he graduated with a degree in Modern History. Upon graduating, Cheetham spent a year teaching English at a school in Valberg, Norway, to Tibetan refugees between the ages of 13 and 18.

== Career in publishing ==
After returning to the UK in 1965, Cheetham became educational editor at the New English Library (NEL), a subsidiary of New American Library, working under its then-managing director Gareth Powell. Cheetham's first big success came with the acquisition of Frank Herbert's novel Dune while at NEL. When Powell left shortly after, so did Cheetham, following him to Sphere Books, where he became non-fiction editor. It was at Sphere that he started his first two non-fiction imprints – Abacus and Cardinal – in 1972.

In 1973, he was recruited by the British Printing Corporation as founder and managing director of Futura Publications, a paperback start-up complementary to hardback house Macdonald and Jane's. When Robert Maxwell launched takeover bid for the British Printing Corporation in 1976, Cheetham was promoted to head both Macdonald and Futura. The combined company's greatest success was Colleen McCullough's The Thorn Birds (1977), which sold some 30 million copies worldwide. This marked the start of a 40-year friendship between author and publisher, and semi-annual visits to McCullough's home on the remote Pacific shores of Norfolk Island.

With Gail Rebuck, Peter Roche and Cheetham's then-wife Rosie De Courcy, he founded Century Publishing, later Century Hutchinson, growing it successfully until its acquisition by Random House UK in 1989.

In 1991, Cheetham co-founded Orion Publishing Group. The following year, Orion acquired Weidenfeld & Nicolson. Cheetham went on to oversee Orion's growth, with a view toward launching the company on the stock market. Orion saw soaring sales during the mid-1990s and quickly grew to become a powerhouse in UK publishing.

After leaving Orion in 2003, Cheetham acted as consultant at Random House UK, and held leading positions thereafter at Quercus Publishing and Atlantic Books. Leaving Atlantic in 2011, he founded Head of Zeus as a publishing start-up in 2012. Cheetham was to briefly leave and then return in 2017; under his aegis Head of Zeus reoriented away from an overwhelming focus on the e-book market toward a more balanced model.

In 2018, Cheetham handed over the position of chief executive at Head of Zeus to his son Nicolas.

Cheetham was appointed Commander of the Order of the British Empire (CBE) in the 2023 Birthday Honours for services to literature.

== Personal life ==
Cheetham is currently married to literary agent Georgina Capel.
