= Anthony Lambert =

British diplomat (1911–2007)

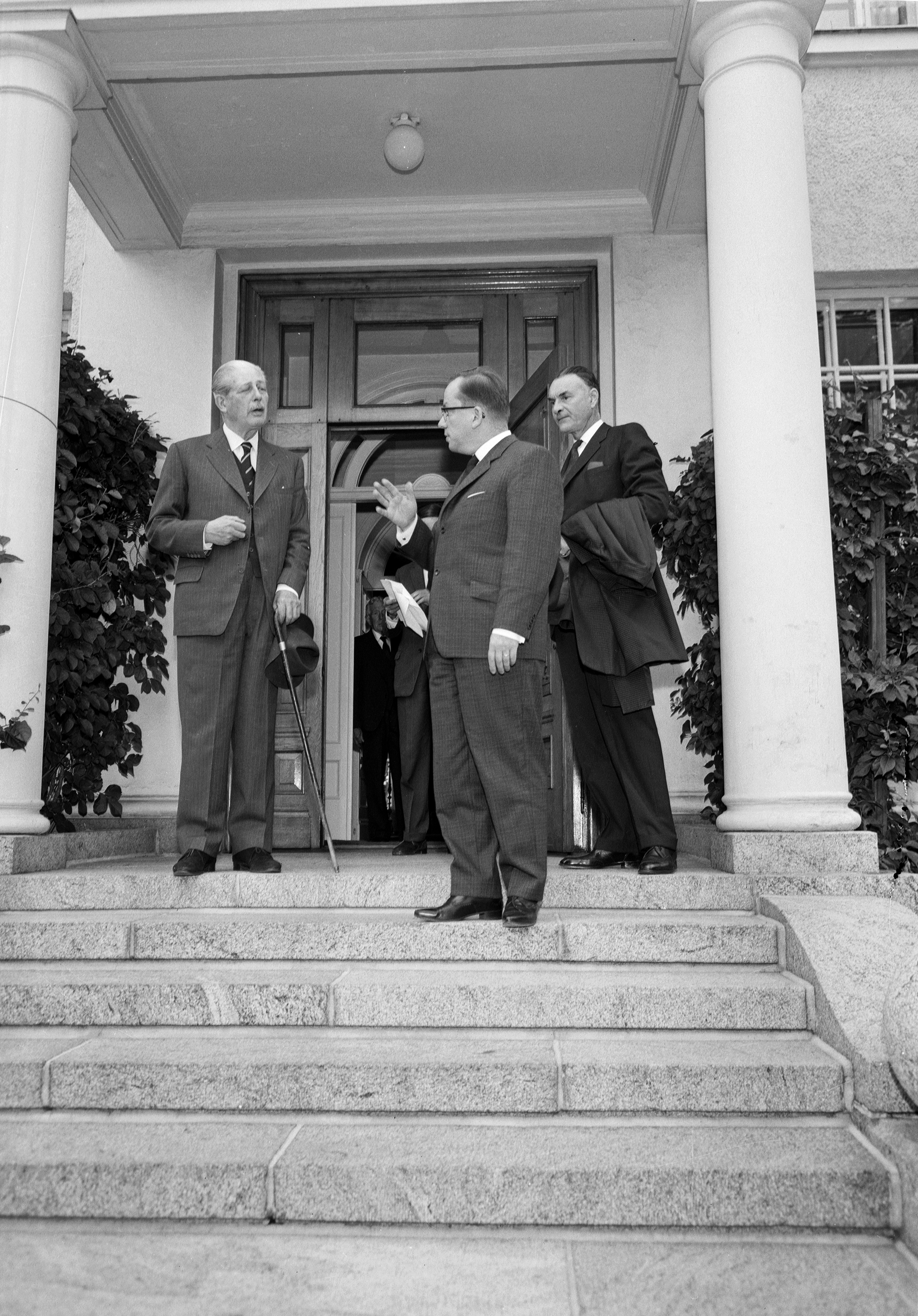
Anthony Lambert standing to the right when the Prime Minister Harold Macmillan (left) visited Finland. In the middle, the Finnish Minister Ahti Karjalainen.

Sir Anthony Lambert KCMG (7 March 1911 – 28 April 2007) was a British diplomat who was UK envoy to Bulgaria, Tunisia, Finland and Portugal.

== Career ==
Sir Anthony was described by The Telegraph as

one of the last diplomats to take seriously the freedom of his Sovereign's commission "to do and perform all proper acts, matters and things which may be desirable or necessary for the promotion of relations of friendship, good understanding and harmonious intercourse between Our Realm and ..." rather than merely convey messages to and from London.

Anthony Edward Lambert was educated at Harrow School and went with a scholarship to Balliol College, Oxford. He joined the Foreign Office in 1934 and served first in Brussels, then during World War II in Ankara (where his ambassador Sir Hughe Knatchbull-Hugessen was spied on by his Albanian valet Elyesa Bazna, codenamed Cicero by the Germans), then Beirut where he was involved in General Sir Louis Spears' campaign to counter French influence, then after the Allied invasion of Europe in 1944 he was posted to Brussels again and later to Stockholm and to Athens where during travels around the country he compiled a checklist of the birds of Greece which became a standard work of reference.

Lambert was Minister to Bulgaria 1958–60, where he instigated the first production of a British Opera in Sofia by spending his cultural budget on records of Peter Grimes which he left on a table at a party for opera enthusiasts: after the party the records were gone and the local opera company subsequently staged Peter Grimes with sets by Osbert Lancaster who was a friend of Mr and Mrs Lambert. Lambert was Ambassador to Tunisia 1960–63, to Finland 1963–66 and to Portugal 1966–70.

Lambert retired from the Diplomatic Service in 1970 and became director of a textile company, Crosrol Ltd. In retirement he also edited a new edition of John Betjeman's Guide to English Parish Churches.

== Publications ==
- A specific check list of the birds of Greece, Ibis, volume 99, issue 1, January 1957
- Spring migration of raptors in Bulgaria, Ibis, volume 103A, Issue 1, January 1961

== Honours ==
Lambert was appointed CMG in the 1955 Queen's Birthday Honours and knighted KCMG in the 1964 New Year Honours.

Diplomatic posts
Preceded by Richard Speaight	Envoy Extraordinary and Minister Plenipotentiary at Sofia; 1958–1960	Succeeded by Anthony Lincoln
Preceded by Angus Malcolm	Ambassador Extraordinary and Plenipotentiary at Tunis; 1960–1963	Succeeded by Sir Herbert Marchant
Preceded by Sir Con O'Neill	Ambassador Extraordinary and Plenipotentiary at Helsinki; 1963–1966	Succeeded by Sir David Scott Fox
Preceded by Archibald Ross	Ambassador Extraordinary and Plenipotentiary at Lisbon; 1966–1970	Succeeded by Sir David Muirhead
