= Arthur Grant Duff =

British diplomat

Sir Arthur Cuninghame Grant Duff KCMG (23 May 1861 – 11 April 1948) was a British diplomat who was Minister to several countries.

== Career ==
Arthur Cuninghame Grant Duff was the eldest son of M.E. Grant Duff (later Sir Mountstuart Grant Duff). He was educated at Clifton College and Balliol College, Oxford. He entered HM Diplomatic Service in 1865 and was posted as attaché to the embassy in Madrid. After serving in Vienna, Stockholm and Peking he was recalled to London in 1897 and spent three years working at the Foreign Office. He then began a succession of short appointments: in Caracas, as Second Secretary at Bern, Secretary of Legation in Mexico from September 1902, Caracas again, Mexico again, Stockholm again, and Brussels. In some of those postings he was Chargé d'affaires in the absence of the minister or ambassador. In 1906 he was appointed chargé d'affaires at Darmstadt and Karlsruhe (then the capitals of the Grand Duchies of Hesse and Baden respectively), but after only six months he was sent to Havana as Minister to Cuba. In the summer of 1909 he returned to Europe and the courts of minor German states, combining the roles of Minister Resident at Dresden (Kingdom of Saxony) and at Coburg (Saxe-Coburg-Gotha) and Chargé d'Affaires at Waldeck-Pyrmont. He remained there until the outbreak of the First World War in 1914 when he returned to London to work in Admiralty Intelligence until 1919.

After the war, Grant Duff was Minister to Peru and Ecuador 1920–23, to Chile 1923–24, and to Sweden 1924–27. He retired in 1927 after 42 years' service.

Arthur Grant Duff was appointed a Knight Commander of the Order of St Michael and St George (KCMG) in the 1924 Birthday Honours at the end of his service in Chile. The Swedish government awarded him the Grand Cross of the Order of the Star of the North.

== Family ==
In 1906 Arthur Grant Duff married Kathleen, younger daughter of General Powell Clayton, who had been U.S. Ambassador to Mexico when Grant Duff was posted there. She died in 1963.

== Offices held ==
Diplomatic posts
Preceded by Lionel Carden	Minister Resident to the Republic of Cuba, and His Majesty's Consul-General for that Republic; 1906–1909	Succeeded by Stephen Leech
Preceded by Mansfeldt Findlay	Minister Resident at the Courts of Saxony and Saxe-Coburg and Gotha, and Chargé d'Affaires at Arolsen for Waldeck and Pyrmont; 1909–1914	Succeeded by (no representation)
Preceded by Ernest Rennie	Envoy Extraordinary and Minister Plenipotentiary to the Republics of Peru and Ecuador; 1920–1923	Succeeded by Lord Herbert Hervey
Preceded by Tudor Vaughan	Envoy Extraordinary and Minister Plenipotentiary to the Republic of Chile; 1923–1924	Succeeded by Sir Thomas Hohler
Preceded by Colville Barclay	Ambassador Extraordinary and Plenipotentiary to the King of Sweden; 1924–1927	Succeeded by Sir Tudor Vaughan
