= Francis Stronge =

British diplomat

Francis William Stronge DCMG

Ambassador of the United Kingdom to Chile
- In office 1913–1919
- Monarch: George V
- Prime Minister: H. H. Asquith; David Lloyd George
- Preceded by: Henry Lowther
- Succeeded by: Tudor Vaughan

Ambassador of the United Kingdom to the Mexico
- In office 1911–1913
- Monarch: George V
- Prime Minister: H. H. Asquith
- Preceded by: Reginald Tower
- Succeeded by: Sir Lionel Carden

Ambassador of the United Kingdom to Colombia
- In office 1906–1911
- Monarch: Edward VII
- Preceded by: George Earle Welby
- Succeeded by: Percy Wyndham

Personal details
- Born: 22 November 1856
- Died: 20 August 1924 (aged 67)
- Education: Trinity College Dublin

Military service
- Allegiance: United Kingdom
- Branch/service: British Army
- Commands: Royal Tyrone Fusiliers.

Sir Francis William Stronge KCMG (22 November 1856 – 20 August 1924), was a senior British diplomat and the second son of Sir John Calvert Stronge and Lady Margaret Stronge. Sir Francis never inherited the baronetcy but was later knighted in his own right.

== Biography ==
Born to a distinguished Irish family in Balleskie, Fife, he was educated at Trinity College Dublin and joined the British Army with a commission in the Royal Tyrone Fusiliers. He served as sub-lieutenant in the regiment, resigning his commission in 1876.

Stronge joined the Diplomatic Service in 1879 and served in British embassies in Vienna, Peking, Constantinople, Rome and Athens. He was appointed Consul General for Hungary in 1903 and in 1904 was promoted to the post of Councillor of Embassy in Constantinople. From 1906 to 1911 he was Minister General and Consul General in Colombia. He then served as Minister Plenipotentiary in Mexico from 1911 until 1913.

During this crucial period in Mexican history, Stronge unfortunately showed more attention to ornithology than to his diplomacy, ceding his authority to the unscrupulous American Ambassador Henry Lane Wilson at a conference of foreign ambassadors with President Francisco I. Madero. As a result of Wilson's machinations, Madero was brought down in la decena trágica, a bloody coup d'état that brought Victoriano Huerta to power. Huerta favoured Stronge and asked Lord Cowdray to use his influence to have Sir Francis retained as Ambassador to Mexico, but he was moved to a new post that year.

From 1913 to 1919 he served as Envoy Extraordinary and Minister Plenipotentiary at Santiago, Chile. He was knighted on 3 June 1915 in recognition of his services, the key one being negotiating the purchase from Chile of two battleships, the Almirante Latorre and the Admirante Cochrane that were building in British yards for the Chilean Navy. Both ships were then used by the Royal Navy in World War I.

On 10 November 1909 he married Maria Elizabeth Fraser of Castleconnell, daughter of General Sir David Macdowall Fraser. The couple lived at Kilbroney House, Rostrevor, County Down, where Stronge died in August 1924.

== See also ==
- List of Ambassadors from the United Kingdom to Chile

Diplomatic posts
| Preceded by George Earle Welby | Minister Resident and Consul-General in the Republic of Colombia; 1906–1911 | Succeeded by Percy Wyndham |
| Preceded by Reginald Tower | Envoy Extraordinary and Minister Plenipotentiary to the United States of Mexico; 1911–1913 | Succeeded by Sir Lionel Carden |
| Preceded by Henry Lowther | Envoy Extraordinary and Minister Plenipotentiary to the Republic of Chile; 1913–1919 | Succeeded by Tudor Vaughan |
