= David Scott Fox =

British diplomat and writer

Sir Robin David John Scott Fox KCMG (20 June 1910 – 25 January 1985) was a British diplomat and writer.

== Career ==
David Scott Fox (Scott Fox is a double-barrelled surname) was educated at Eton College and Christ Church, Oxford, before entering the Diplomatic Service in 1934.

He served in Berlin and Prague before the Second World War. During 1945–47 he was a Foreign Office representative at the Nuremberg Trials of the major Nazi war criminals; then went to Japan to assist in setting up a similar trial.

Later after postings in Brazil, Saudi Arabia, Turkey and at the United Nations, he was Minister to Romania and Ambassador to Chile and Finland.

On his retirement he was part-time Special Representative of the Foreign Secretary 1970–75.

== Books ==
- Mediterranean Heritage, Routledge, Abingdon, 1978, reprinted 2014. ISBN 978-1-138-01753-5
- Saint George: the saint with three faces, Kensal Press, Windsor, 1983. ISBN 978-0-946041-13-8
- Darkest Angel, limited edition of 50 copies, London, 1999

Diplomatic posts
Preceded by Alan Dudley	Envoy Extraordinary and Minister Plenipotentiary at Bucharest; 1959–1961	Succeeded by Dalton Murray
Preceded by Ivor Pink	Ambassador Extraordinary and Plenipotentiary at Santiago; 1961–1966	Succeeded by Sir Frederick Mason
Preceded by Sir Anthony Lambert	Ambassador Extraordinary and Plenipotentiary at Helsinki; 1966–1969	Succeeded by Bernard Ledwidge
