= Rowland Sperling =

British diplomat (1874–1965)

Sir Rowland Sperling KCMG CB
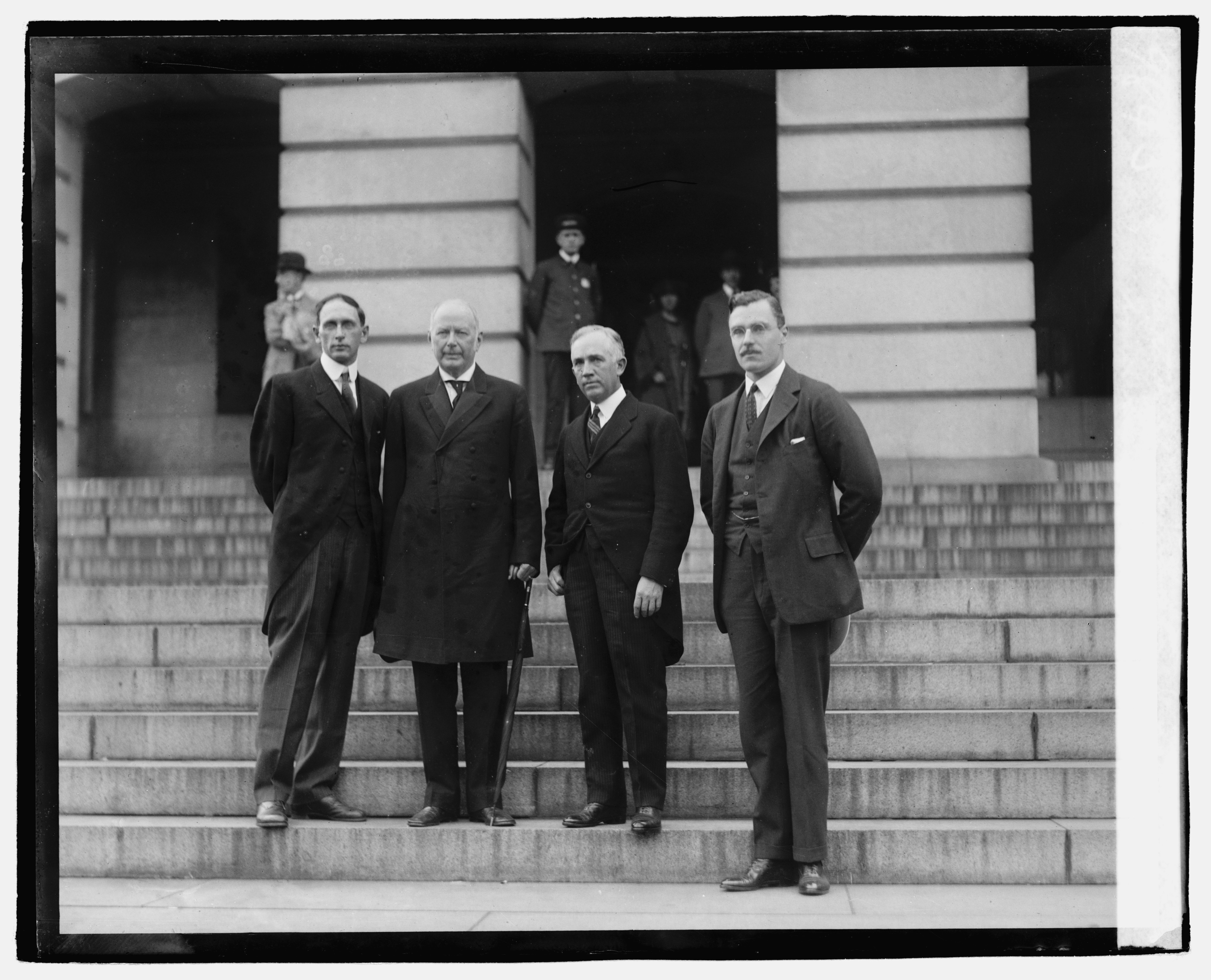

British Ambassador to Finland
- In office 1930–1935
- Preceded by: Sir Ernest Rennie
- Succeeded by: Herbert Grant Watson

British Ambassador to Bulgaria
- In office 1928–1929
- Preceded by: Sir William Erskine
- Succeeded by: Sir Sydney Waterlow

British Ambassador to Switzerland
- In office 1924–1928
- Preceded by: Sir Milne Cheetham
- Succeeded by: Sir Claud Russell

Personal details
- Born: Rowland Arthur Charles Sperling; 4 January 1874 London, England
- Died: 1 August 1965 (aged 91) Mere, Wiltshire, England
- Spouse: Dorothy Constance Kingsmill (m. 1905; died 1951)
- Children: 3
- Education: Eton College
- Alma mater: New College, Oxford

Sir Rowland Arthur Charles Sperling KCMG CB (4 January 1874 –1 August 1965) was a British diplomat who served as ambassador to Switzerland, Bulgaria, and Finland.

== Early life ==
Sperling was born in London in 1874, the son of Commander Rowland Money Sperling of the Royal Navy, and Marian Charlotte Keyser, daughter of stockbroker Charles Keyser. He was educated at Eton College and New College, Oxford. He left Oxford in 1899 without a degree, and went to work as a clerk in the Foreign Office.

== Diplomat ==
He was sent to Russia in 1902 to learn Russian, before joining the Diplomatic Service, becoming acting third secretary in St Petersburg. He returned to the Foreign Office in 1905 first as an assistant clerk, then as a senior clerk, and in 1914, as Head of the Western Department. He stayed in the Foreign Office during the First World War. He was an attaché at the Paris Peace Conference, and was made Assistant Secretary at the Foreign Office in 1919. In 1920, he represented the United Kingdom at a conference on international communications in Washington. By 1924 he was transferred to the Diplomatic Service and he was appointed Minister at Bern, serving as Envoy Extraordinary and Minister Plenipotentiary to Switzerland from 1924 to 1928. In 1928 he was appointed Minister to the Kingdom of Bulgaria in Sofia from 1928 to 1929, and then to Finland from 1930 to 35. He retired from the Diplomatic Service in 1935.

== Family life ==
In 1905, Sperling married Dorothy Constance Kingsmill (1874–1951), daughter of William Howley Kingsmill DL JP (1838–1894) of Sydmonton Court, Sydmonton, and Constance Mary Portal (died 1947), daughter of Sir Wyndham Spencer Portal, 1st Bt. They had two sons and a daughter. One son was killed in active service in a flying accident at Manston Airport in March 1940. His wife died in 1951.

Following retirement to Kingsclere, Hampshire, he was a member of Hampshire County Council from 1936 to 1949, and High Sheriff of Hampshire from 1945 to 1946. Sperling died on 8 January 1965 at his home in Wiltshire aged 91.

== Honours and awards ==
- In the 1921 Birthday Honours he was appointed a Companion of the Order of St Michael and St George (CMG);
- In the 1924 Birthday Honours he was appointed a Companion of the Order of the Bath (CB);
- In the 1934 New Year Honours, Sperling was invested as a Knight Commander of the Order of St Michael and St George (KCMG).
