= Alan Dudley =

British diplomat (1907–1971)

Sir Alan Dudley KBE CMG

British envoy extraordinary and minister plenipotentiary to Romania
- In office 1956–1959
- Preceded by: Sir Dermot MacDermot
- Succeeded by: Sir David Scott Fox

Personal details
- Born: 31 May 1907
- Died: 13 September 1971 (aged 64)
- Children: 1
- Occupation: Civil servant and diplomat

Sir Alan Alves Dudley (31 May 1907 – 13 September 1971) was a British civil servant and diplomat who served as envoy extraordinary and minister plenipotentiary to Romania from 1956 to 1959. From 1964 to 1968, he was deputy secretary at the Ministry of Overseas Development.

== Career ==
Dudley began his career working at the British Library of Information in New York in 1930 as assistant director. In 1940, he became director of the British Press Service and British Information Service in New York.

In 1942, Dudley entered the Foreign Office, and worked in the Information Policy department becoming its head in 1946. In 1948, he was promoted to sixth grade in the Foreign Service. From 1949 to 1950, he served as counsellor to the UK delegation to the O.E.E.C. at Paris, and then head of the United Nations Economic and Social department, a post he held from 1950 to 1953.

From 1953 to 1956, he served as Deputy Commissioner-General for South-East Asia based in Singapore. He was then posted to Romania as envoy extraordinary and minister plenipotentiary where he remained from 1956 until 1959. From 1959 to 1961, he was minister and adviser for economic and social affairs of the UK delegation to the United Nations at New York. In 1961, he was seconded as assistant under-secretary to the Department of Technical Co-operation, and then in 1964 was appointed deputy secretary at the Ministry of Overseas Development, a post he held until 1968. After retiring from the service he became a director of the Electronic Components Board (ECB).

== Personal life and death ==
Dudley married Isabel Brunton in 1930 and they had a daughter.

Dudley died on 13 September 1971, aged 64.

== Honours ==
Dudley was appointed Companion of the Order of St Michael and St George (CMG) in the 1948 Birthday Honours. He was appointed Knight Commander of the Order of the British Empire (KBE) in the 1961 Birthday Honours.

== See also ==
- Romania–United Kingdom relations

Diplomatic posts
Preceded by Sir Dermot MacDermot	British envoy extraordinary and minister plenipotentiary to Romania; 1956–1959	Succeeded by Sir David Scott Fox
