= Geoffrey Wallinger =

British diplomat (1903–1979)

Sir Geoffrey Arnold Wallinger GBE KCMG (2 May 1903 – 5 July 1979) was a British diplomat who was envoy to Hungary and ambassador to Thailand, Austria and Brazil. He was a signatory of the treaty that ended the occupation of Austria following World War II.

== Career ==
Wallinger was educated at Sherborne School (where he played cricket for the school) and Clare College, Cambridge. He joined the Diplomatic Service in 1926 and served at Cairo, Vienna, Pretoria and Cape Town, Buenos Aires and Nanking (the capital of the Kuomintang government of China) as well as at the Foreign Office.

Wallinger was Minister (head of mission) to Hungary 1949–51 and Ambassador to Thailand 1951–54. He was appointed Ambassador to Austria in 1954, but served as High Commissioner until Austria was released from Allied occupation; during that time he completed the negotiations of, and signed, the Austrian Independence Treaty of May 1955. He remained in Vienna as Ambassador until 1958. He was then Ambassador to Brazil 1958–63.

== Honours ==
Wallinger was appointed CMG in 1947, knighted KCMG in the 1953 Coronation Honours, and awarded the additional, senior knighthood of GBE in the 1963 New Year Honours.

Diplomatic posts
Preceded by Sir Knox Helm	Envoy Extraordinary and Minister Plenipotentiary at Budapest; 1949–1951	Succeeded by Robert Hankey
Preceded by Sir John Magowan	Ambassador Extraordinary and Plenipotentiary at Bangkok; 1951–1954	Succeeded by Sir Berkeley Gage
Preceded by Sir Harold Caccia	Ambassador Extraordinary and Plenipotentiary at Vienna; 1954–1958	Succeeded by Sir James Bowker
Preceded by Sir Geoffrey Harrison	Ambassador Extraordinary and Plenipotentiary at Rio de Janeiro; 1958–1963	Succeeded by Sir Leslie Fry
