= List of ambassadors of the United Kingdom to Finland =

The ambassador of the United Kingdom to Finland is the United Kingdom's foremost diplomatic representative in the Republic of Finland, and head of the UK's diplomatic mission there. The official title is His Britannic Majesty's Ambassador to the Republic of Finland.

== Heads of mission ==
=== Chargés d'affaires ===
- 1919: Henry Bell
- 1919: Coleridge Kennard

=== Ambassadors ===
- 1919–1920: The Lord Alton
- 1920–1921: George Kidston
- 1921–1930: Sir Ernest Rennie
- 1930–1935: Sir Rowland Sperling
- 1935–1937: Herbert Grant Watson
- 1937–1940: Thomas Snow
- 1940–1941: Sir George Vereker
- 1941–1944: No representation due to Continuation War
- 1944–1947: Sir Francis Shepherd
- 1947–1951: Sir Oswald Scott
- 1951–1954: Sir Andrew Noble
- 1954–1958: Michael Cresswell
- 1958–1961: Sir Douglas Busk
- 1961–1963: Sir Con O'Neill
- 1963–1966: Sir Anthony Lambert
- 1966–1969: Sir David Scott Fox
- 1969–1972: Bernard Ledwidge
- 1972–1975: Anthony Elliott
- 1975–1980: James Cable
- 1980–1983: Andrew Stuart
- 1983–1986: Alan Brooke Turner
- 1986–1989: Justin Staples
- 1989–1995: Neil Smith
- 1995–1997: David Burns
- 1997–2000: Gavin Hewitt
- 2000–2002: Alyson Bailes
- 2002–2006: Matthew Kirk
- 2006–2010: Valerie Caton
- 2010–2014: Matthew Lodge
- 2014–2017: Sarah Price
- 2018–2021: Tom Dodd
- 2021–2024 Theresa Bubbear
- 2024-present: Laura Davies
