= Robert Greg =

British diplomat

Sir Robert Hyde Greg, KCMG (24 December 1876 – 3 December 1953), was a British diplomat. He served as the British Minister to Siam from 1921 to 1926 and to Romania from 1926 to 1929.

Greg was also a noted collector of Egyptian antiquities. In his will, he bequeathed his collection of 626 objects to the Fitzwilliam Museum in Cambridge. He also left a substantial part of his estate to the museum, but the funds were confiscated by the Egyptian government in the aftermath of the Suez Crisis. In 1964, compensation amounting to £33,515 17s 6d was paid to the Fitzwilliam Museum. This formed the Greg Fund, which exists to the present day.

In 1914, Greg married the American heiress Julia Fairchild Schreiner.
