= Leslie Alfred Charles Fry =

British diplomat

Sir Leslie Fry

United Kingdom Ambassador to Hungary
- In office 1955–1959
- Preceded by: Sir George Labouchère
- Succeeded by: Sir Ivor Pink

United Kingdom Ambassador to Indonesia
- In office 1959–1963
- Preceded by: Dermot MacDermot
- Succeeded by: Sir Andrew Gilchrist

United Kingdom Ambassador to Brazil
- In office 1963–1966
- Preceded by: Sir Geoffrey Wallinger
- Succeeded by: Sir John Russell

Personal details
- Born: 17 April 1908
- Died: 21 October 1976 (aged 68)
- Education: Royal Masonic School, Royal Military Academy Sandhurst
- Profession: Diplomat and ambassador
- Awards: KCMG

Sir Leslie Alfred Charles Fry KCMG OBE (17 April 1908 – 21 October 1976) was a British diplomat, who served as Ambassador to Hungary, Indonesia and Brazil. He was awarded Grand Cross of the Order of the Southern Cross by the Government of Brazil. When the Soviet Union invaded Hungary in 1956 to repress the Hungarian Revolution, he opened the doors of the British embassy to Hungarian refugees, receiving a knighthood the following year.

== Life ==
Leslie "Bunny" Fry was born in 1908 in Monmouthshire, Wales and christened in Jammu and Kashmir.

Fry's parents were Florence Rose Fry (née Stokes, 1882–1918) and Alfred Andrew Fry MBE (1870–1919). Leslie Fry's father was a Freemason who prior to World War I had served in the South Wales Borderers as a Lieutenant and Quartermaster, Monmouthshire Regiment, 3rd Battalion, and during World War I as both a captain in the British Army, Monmouthshire Regiment, 3rd Battalion (Territorial) and a lieutenant in the Royal Air Force, 12th Wing.

Fry attended the Royal Masonic School and later graduated from the Royal Military Academy Sandhurst.

Fry's first wife was Mary Cuerden, from whom he separated and remarried. Mary Cuerden's second husband was Captain Basil Gerritsen Ivory, formerly of the Special Operations Executive and director of the investment trust British Assets Trust Limited. Fry's second wife was Marian Bentley, whom he married in 1954.

== British Army career ==
Fry joined the British Army in India from 1928. On 2 February 1928, he was promoted to Second Lieutenant, Indian Army. In 1933, he transferred to the Indian Political Service. Between 1941 and 1944, he served as Undersecretary of the Government of India in the Ministry of Foreign Affairs. In 1946, he became Deputy Secretary of the Government of India in the Ministry of Foreign Affairs.

== Diplomatic career ==
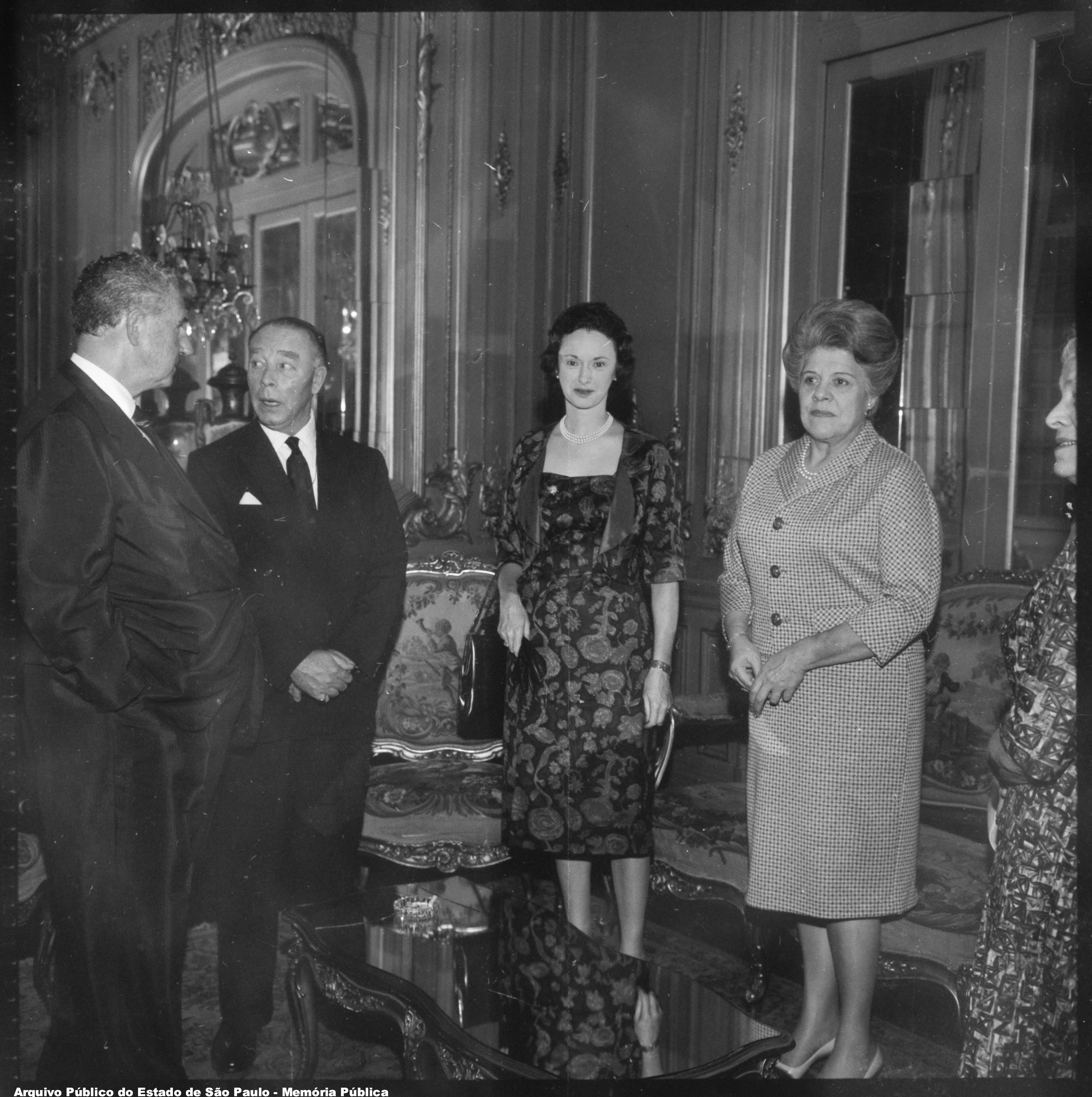
Sir Leslie Fry and Marian Bentley in Brazil with Adhemar (left) and Leonor Mendes de Barros (right), 1964. Arquivo Público do Estado de São Paulo.

On 23 June 1947, Fry joined His Majesty's Foreign Service at the Seventh Grade listed alongside his cousin, Robert Morton Saner OBE. On 30 October 1947, Fry transferred from the Indian Civil Service to the Foreign Office. From 1951 to 1953, he served as Minister-Counsellor in Lisbon. Between 1953 and 1955, he was Head of the Foreign Office's Eastern Department.

On 24 October 1955, he was appointed Her Majesty's Envoy Extraordinary and Minister Plenipotentiary to Hungary. On 11 February 1959, he was ambassador to Indonesia. On 16 June 1963, he replaced Geoffrey Wallinger as ambassador to Brazil.

Fry retired in 1966 and returned to Britain.

=== Awards and honours ===
- 1944 New Year Honours awarded MBE when serving in the Indian Political Service as "Under Secretary to the Government of India in the External Affairs Department"
- 14 August 1947 awarded OBE when "Deputy Secretary to the Government of India in the External Affairs and Commonwealth Relations Department"
- 1955 Birthday Honours awarded CMG
- 1957 Birthday Honours awarded KCMG

=== Bibliography ===
Fry's memoirs, published in 1978:

- Fry, Leslie (1 January 1978). As Luck Would Have It: A Memoir (UK ed.). London: Phillimore & Company. ISBN 9780850333145.
