= Adrian Holman =

British diplomat (1895–1974)

Sir Adrian Holman
- Born: 22 December 1895
- Died: 6 September 1974 (aged 78)
- Relatives: Richard Haswell Holman (Father)
- Military career
- Allegiance: United Kingdom
- Branch: British Army
- Service years: 1915–1918
- Conflicts: World War I
- Awards: Military Cross; Mentioned in dispatches
- Other work: British diplomat

Sir Adrian Holman KBE CMG MC (22 December 1895 – 6 September 1974) was a British diplomat.

== Early life ==
The son of Richard Haswell Holman, he was educated at Copthorne Preparatory School, Harrow School, and New College, Oxford.

== Career ==
He served in British Army with the Royal Artillery during World War I, from 1915 to 1918, and received the Military Cross and was mentioned in dispatches.

In 1920, he joined the Diplomatic Service as a Third Secretary, serving in Brussels from 1921 to 1924 (promoted to Second Secretary while there, 1922). In Rome, 1924–1926, then Paris, 1926 to 1931, (becoming First Secretary in 1931). On 30 April 1930 he married the Hon. (Harriet) Anne Tyrrell, only surviving child of William George Tyrrell, Baron Tyrrell of Avon, British Ambassador to France. The wedding, at Notre Dame Cathedral, was the first 'official' wedding of a British subject at the cathedral since the marriage of Mary Queen of Scots and the Dauphin of France in 1558, and was attended by 'vast crowds'; within a year, Mrs Holman had applied to the Pope for an annulment, and Holman accepted a posting as Secretary of Legation at Peking, 1931 to 1935. At the Foreign Office, 1935–1938, then at the British Embassies in Berlin 1938–1939 and The Hague, 1939. In 1940, he married (secondly) Betty, the only daughter of Sir Gilbert Fox, 1st Baronet. Posted to Baghdad, 1940, where he became Counsellor, then to Tehran in 1942 and next the British Mission in Algiers.

In 1944, Holman returned to Paris as Minister, then was British Political Representative in Romania, from 1946 to 1947 and Minister there, 1947–1949. He was Minister Plenipotentiary to Cuba, from 1949, a post which was redesignated as ambassador in 1950. He remained in Cuba until he retired from the Foreign Service in May 1954.

In retirement, he lived at Bohunt Manor, Liphook, Hampshire, where he indulged his recreations of fishing and gardening. He was a member of the Bath Club in London.

== Honours ==
- Military Cross
- Companion of the Order of St Michael and St George, 1936
- Coronation Medal, 1937
- Coronation Medal, 1953
- Chevalier of the Order of Leopold (Belgium)
- Knights Commander of the Order of the British Empire, 1954

== Bibliography ==
- HOLMAN, Sir Adrian in Who's Who 1974 (London, A. & C. Black, 1974)

Diplomatic posts
Preceded by No representation due to World War II previously Sir Reginald Hoare	Envoy Extraordinary and Minister Plenipotentiary to Romania; 1947–1948	Succeeded by Anthony Colin Kendll
Preceded by Previous heads of mission were Ministers Plenipotentiary	British Ambassador to Cuba; 1950–1954	Succeeded by Wilfred Gallienne
