= Leslie Glass (diplomat) =

British diplomat (1911 - 1988)

Leslie Charles Glass =

Minister/Ambassador to Romania
- In office 1965–1967
- Monarch: Elizabeth II
- Prime Minister: Harold Wilson
- Preceded by: Dalton Murray
- Succeeded by: John Chadwick

British High Commissioner to Jamaica
- In office 1969–1971
- Monarch: Elizabeth II
- Prime Minister: Harold Wilson; Edward Heath
- Preceded by: David Hunt
- Succeeded by: Cyril Pickard

Personal details
- Born: 28 May 1911
- Died: 17 December 1988 (aged 77)

Leslie Charles Glass KCMG (28 May 1911 – 17 December 1988) was a British diplomat who ended his career as High Commissioner to Nigeria.

== Education ==
Glass was educated at Bradfield College; Trinity College, Oxford; and SOAS.

== Career ==
Glass joined the Indian Civil Service in 1934. He served at Mandalay and Rangoon. After World War Two he was Head of Chancery for HM Legation at Budapest, then its Chargé d’Affaires. He was Head of the Information Division for the British Middle East Office from 1953 to 1956; seconded to the Staff of the Governor of Cyprus from 1955 to 1956; and Counsellor and Consul-General in Washington DC from 1957 to 1961.

Glass was Assistant Under-Secretary of State in the Foreign Office from 1962 to 1965; Ambassador to Romania from 1965 to 1967; and Deputy Permanent Representative to the UN from 1967 until his last appointment in Nigeria.

Diplomatic posts
| Preceded by Dalton Murray | Minister/Ambassador to Romania; 1965–1967 | Succeeded by John Chadwick |
| Preceded by David Hunt | British High Commissioner to Nigeria; 1969–1971 | Succeeded by Cyril Pickard |
