= Tudor Vaughan =

British diplomat (1870–1929)

Sir John Charles Tudor Vaughan KCMG MVO (4 February 1870 – 26 April 1929) was a British diplomat who was envoy to several countries.

== Origins ==
Born at Horsham, he was the second son of Henry Vaughan (1834–1887), a Commander in the Royal Navy, and his first wife Emily Hudson (1834–1870). He was a great-grandson of the judge Sir John Vaughan.

== Career ==
He joined the Diplomatic Service in 1894 and served in The Hague, Athens and Cairo before spending three years in South Africa. At Pretoria he was assistant private secretary to Sir Alfred Milner, then political secretary to Lord Roberts, then assistant secretary to the Administration of the Transvaal Republic. He was posted to Peking in 1901, to Constantinople (Istanbul) in 1903 and to Madrid in 1905; he was secretary to the British delegation, and a member of the drafting committee, at the Algeciras Conference in 1906, and was posted to Copenhagen later that year. He was chargé d'affaires at Santiago, Chile in 1911 and at Bucharest in 1912, and was posted back to Madrid in 1913.

He was Envoy Extraordinary and Minister Plenipotentiary to Chile 1918–22, to the Republics of Latvia and Estonia 1922–27 and concurrently Envoy Extraordinary and Minister Plenipotentiary to Lithuania 1923–27, and finally to Sweden 1927–29.

He died at Stockholm while still in office. After a funeral service at St Peter and St Sigfrid's Church in Stockholm, his coffin was conveyed to England aboard the Swedish destroyer Ehrensköld. On arrival in England on 6 May 1929, his body was buried at the Church in the Wood, Hollington, East Sussex.

No record of him marrying or having children is known, and his executor was his half-brother.

== Honours ==
He was appointed a Member of the Royal Victorian Order (MVO) in 1908, on the occasion of the King's visit to Copenhagen and a Companion of the Order of St Michael and St George (CMG) in the New Year Honours of 1918. He was knighted KCMG in the 1925 Birthday Honours. The Danish government made him a Commander of the Order of the Dannebrog.

Diplomatic posts
Preceded by Sir Francis Stronge	Envoy Extraordinary and Minister Plenipotentiary to the Republic of Chile; 1918–1922	Succeeded by Sir Arthur Grant Duff
Preceded by Ernest Wilton	Envoy Extraordinary and Minister Plenipotentiary to the Republic of Latvia and Envoy Extraordinary and Minister Plenipotentiary to the Republic of Estonia; 1922–1927	Succeeded by Joseph Addison
Preceded by Ernest Wilton	Envoy Extraordinary and Minister Plenipotentiary to the Republic of Lithuania; 1923–1927	Succeeded by Joseph Addison
Preceded by Sir Arthur Grant Duff	Envoy Extraordinary and Minister Plenipotentiary to His Majesty the King of Sweden; 1927–1929	Succeeded by Sir Archibald Clark Kerr
