= William Erskine (diplomat) =

British diplomat (1871–1952)

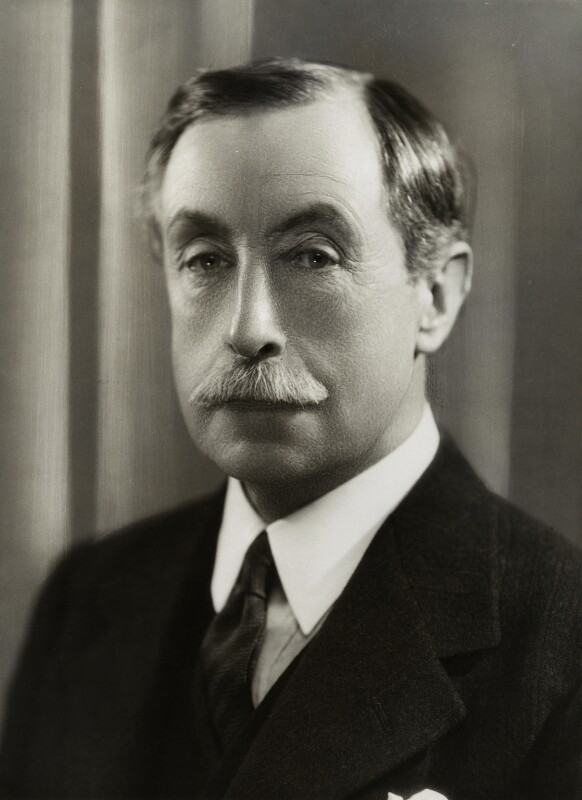
Erskine in 1938

Sir William Augustus Forbes Erskine GCMG MVO PC (30 October 1871 – 17 July 1952) was the first British ambassador to the Republic of Poland.

== Career ==
William Erskine, second son of Walter Erskine, 11th Earl of Mar, was educated at Eton College and Magdalen College, Oxford. He joined the Foreign Office in 1894 and served at Buenos Aires, Tehran, Rome and Stockholm where he was chargé d'affaires in 1913. He was posted to Athens with the rank of Counsellor of Embassy 1913–17 where he was British delegate to the international financial commission which had been established following the Greco-Turkish War (1897) to oversee the public finances of Greece. He was Counsellor at Rome 1917–19, Minister to Cuba 1919–21 (and concurrently to Haiti and the Dominican Republic), Minister to Bulgaria 1921–27, and Minister to Poland 1928–29, continuing there as Ambassador 1929–34 after the post was raised from legation to embassy. He was the first ambassador to Poland since the time of King Jan III Sobieski in the seventeenth century.

== Honours ==
Erskine was appointed MVO in 1906 after attending the then Prince of Wales (later King George V) to Madrid for the marriage of King Alfonso XIII to Princess Victoria Eugenie of Battenberg. He was knighted KCMG in 1926 and raised to GCMG in 1930 when he was also made a member of the Privy Council.

Diplomatic posts
Preceded by Stephen Leech	Envoy Extraordinary and Minister Plenipotentiary to the Republic of Cuba; 1928–1929	Succeeded by Godfrey Haggard
Preceded by Sir Arthur Peel	Envoy Extraordinary and Minister Plenipotentiary to His Majesty the King of the Bulgarians; 1921–1927	Succeeded by Rowland Sperling
Preceded by William Max-Müller	Envoy Extraordinary and Minister Plenipotentiary to the Republic of Poland; 1928–1929	Succeeded by himself, as Ambassador
Preceded by himself, as Minister	Ambassador Extraordinary and Plenipotentiary to the Republic of Poland; 1929–1934	Succeeded by Sir Howard Kennard
