= Lionel Edward Gresley Carden =

British diplomat (1851–1915)

Sir Lionel Edward Gresley Carden KCMG
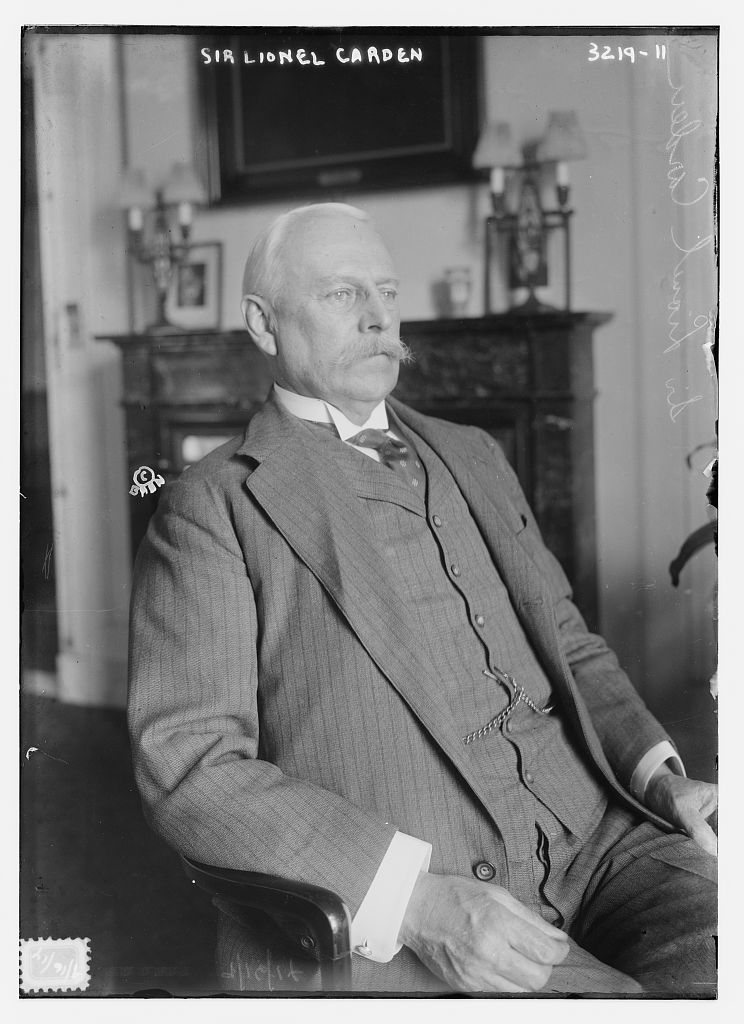
- Carden circa 1910
- Born: 15 September 1851; Brighton, Sussex, England
- Died: 16 October 1915 (aged 64); Knightsbridge, London, England
- Occupation: Colonial civil-servant
- Spouse: Anne Eliza née Lefferts

Sir Lionel Edward Gresley Carden KCMG (15 September 1851 – 16 October 1915) was a British diplomat.

== Early life ==
Carden was born on 15 September 1851 in Brighton, Sussex the son of the Reverend Lionel Carden and Lucy Lawrence née Ottley. He was educated at Eton College.

== Diplomat ==
In 1877 Carden was appointed the vice-consul in Havana and held a number of diplomatic posts around Central America.

Lionel Carden played a central part in an extraordinary plot by Lord Salisbury, then prime minister, to foil Parnell's remarkably successful Home Rule campaign in the 1880s by attempting to prove Parnell's complicity in criminal activities. Salisbury sought to imply that Parnell encouraged the Phoenix Park murders in 1882, and that he was linked to the dynamite outrages in England which culminated in a bomb in the House of Commons in 1887, the year of Queen Victoria's Golden Jubilee. These claims were ultimately disproved in a dramatic hearing at the Royal Courts of Justice in 1889. The principal organiser of the outrages was a certain General Millen who became chairman of the military arm of the American activists. What was kept secret was that in 1885 Lionel Carden, then acting chargé d'affaires at HM Legation in Mexico, interviewed General Millen and with government approval recruited him as a spy, and became his paymaster. Through intermediaries General Millen was directed by Lord Salisbury to ensure that the dynamite explosions continued, thereby creating public outrage against Irish nationalists and Parnell. General Millen met Lionel Carden again in 1888 with an offer, for a very large sum of money, to appear as a witness at the hearing mentioned above, which was about to take place.

In May 1902 Carden was appointed British Minister Resident to Cuba, serving as such until 1905, when he transferred as British Ambassador to Guatemala. He was appointed a Knight Commander of the Order of St Michael and St George (KCMG) in 1912.

During Huerta's regime in Mexico, Carden reassured Victoriano Huerta that Britain would support him against the United States' protests to resign. In 1913 he was recalled from Mexico after his criticism of Woodrow Wilson.

On 18–20 April 1914 Carden returned on the armoured cruiser HMS Berwick (sailing via Galveston to Veracruz) to continue to serve briefly as British Minister to Mexico, during the last three months of the Victoriano Huerta regime.

== Family and later life ==
He married Anne Eliza Lefferts, daughter of John Lefferts, on 15 February 1881 in the United States. Carden died on 16 October 1915 in London at age 64, without issue.

Diplomatic posts
Preceded by	British Ministers Resident in Cuba; 1902–1905	Succeeded by Arthur Grant Duff
Preceded by Sir Audley Gosling	British Ambassador to Guatemala; 1905–1913	Succeeded by Alban Young
Preceded by Francis Stronge	British Ambassador to Mexico; 1913 – January 1914	Succeeded by no representation
