= Alexander Morley =

British diplomat (1908–1971)

Portrait by Walter Bird, 1959

Sir Alexander Morley KCMG CBE (6 January 1908 – 19 September 1971) was a British diplomat. He served as High Commissioner to Ceylon and High Commissioner to Jamaica, then was ambassador of the United Kingdom to Hungary, retiring in 1967.

== Early life ==
The son of Dr Arthur S. Morley FRCS, the young Morley was educated at Rugby School and Queen’s College, Oxford.

== Career ==
In 1930 Morley was appointed to the India Office; from 1933 to 1936 he was Private Secretary to the Parliamentary Under-Secretary of State for India, Rab Butler, then served in the Burma Office from 1938 to 1940 before being seconded to the Ministry of Aircraft Production in 1940. From 1945 to 1947 he was back at the Burma Office, then served as Economic Adviser to the Lord Privy Seal, from 1947 to 1949. Transferring to the Commonwealth Relations Office, he was Deputy High Commissioner in New Zealand, 1950 to 1952, Assistant Under-Secretary of State, 1954, Deputy High Commissioner in Calcutta, 1956, and then High Commissioner in Ceylon, 1957–1962, and British High Commissioner in Jamaica, 1962–65. In 1965 he returned to the Foreign Office and was Ambassador to Hungary, 1965 to 1967.

== Private life ==
In 1939 Morley married Hedy, a daughter of Professor Julius von Landesberger-Antburg, in Vienna. They had one daughter.

A member of the Travellers Club, in 1970 he published The Harrap Opera Guide. His address in retirement was 47 Campden Hill Square, Holland Park, London W8.

== Notes ==
Diplomatic posts
Preceded by Sir Cecil Syers	High Commissioner of the United Kingdom to Ceylon; 1957–1962	Succeeded by Sir Michael Walker
Preceded by New post	High Commissioner of the United Kingdom to Jamaica; 1962–1965	Succeeded by Dalton Murray
Preceded by Sir Ivor Pink	Ambassador Extraordinary and Plenipotentiary at Budapest; 1965–1967	Succeeded by Sir Guy Millard
