= Leycester Coltman =

British diplomat (1938–2002)

Sir Arthur Leycester Scott Coltman (24 May 1938 – 31 March 2002), known as Leycester Coltman, was the British ambassador to Cuba from 1991 to 1994.

Coltman was educated at Rugby School and Magdalene College, Cambridge, and spent a sabbatical year at the Manchester Business School. After joining the British Diplomatic Service, he served in Copenhagen, Cairo, Brasília, Mexico City, and Brussels, and served as the British ambassador to Cuba (1991–94) and to Colombia (1994–98).

Coltman was ambassador to Cuba during the post-Cold War upheaval that saw the Soviet Union withdraw its troops and foreign aid, and he had access to Fidel Castro. He authored a biography, The Real Fidel Castro, about his experiences, which was published shortly after his death in 2002.
