= John Chadwick (diplomat) =

British diplomat (1911–1987)

Sir John Chadwick KCMG

British Ambassador to Romania
- In office 1967–1968
- Preceded by: Sir Leslie Glass
- Succeeded by: Sir Denis Laskey

Personal details
- Born: 17 December 1911
- Died: 30 August 1987 (aged 75)
- Children: 3
- Education: Corpus Christi College, Cambridge
- Occupation: Diplomat

Sir John Edward Chadwick (17 December 1911 – 30 August 1987) was a British civil servant and diplomat who served as British Ambassador to Romania from 1967 to 1968. From 1969 to 1971, he served as head of the British delegation at the OECD in Paris.

== Early life and education ==
Chadwick was born on 17 December 1911, the son of John Chadwick, a barrister and Edith (née Horrocks). He was educated at Rugby School and Corpus Christi College, Cambridge.

== Career ==
Chadwick joined the Department of Overseas Trade as an intelligence officer in 1934, and after being seconded for a year to the Treasury, in 1938 had risen to assistant trade commissioner in Calcutta. In 1941, he was attached to the newly created Eastern Group Supply Council of the Ministry of Supply based in Simla responsible for coordinating the production and distribution of military supplies in the British colonies.

After World War II, Chadwick entered the Foreign Office, and served as commercial secretary at Washington from 1946 to 1948 and then, after two years at the Foreign Office, as first secretary and head of Chancery at Tel Aviv from 1950 to 1953. From 1953 to 1956, he was counsellor (commercial) at Tokyo; head of the Economic Relations Department in the Foreign Office from 1956 to 1960; minister (economic) at Buenos Aires from 1960 to 1962; and minister (commercial) at Washington from 1963 to 1967. While in Washington, according to the Times, "He was an outspoken critic of the failure of Britain to maintain its exports to the United States, expressing the opinion that businesses were often failing to take advantage of the intense diplomatic activity which was being undertaken on their behalf."

Chadwick was appointed British Ambassador to Romania in 1967, serving until 1968. The following year, he was appointed head of the British legation to the Organisation for Economic Co-operation and Development (OECD) in Paris, a post he held until 1971.

After retiring from the diplomatic service, Chadwick was adviser to the Asian Development Bank (ADB), serving from 1973 to 1983.

== Personal life and death ==
Chadwick married 1945, Audrey Lenfestey in 1945, then a principal working at the Department of Overseas Trade, and they had a son and two daughters.

Chadwick died on 30 August 1987, aged 75.

== Honours ==
Chadwick was appointed Companion of the Order of St Michael and St George (CMG) in the 1957 New Years Honours, and promoted to Knight Commander (KCMG) in the 1967 New Year Honours.

== See also ==
- Romania–United Kingdom relations

Diplomatic posts
Preceded by Sir Leslie Glass	British Ambassador to Romania; 1967–1968	Succeeded by Sir Denis Laskey
