= Giles Portman =

British diplomat

His Excellency Giles Portman
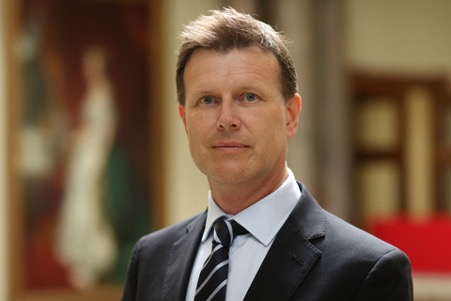

British Ambassador to Romania
- Incumbent
- Assumed office October 2023
- Monarch: Charles III
- Prime Minister: Rishi Sunak; Keir Starmer
- Preceded by: Andrew Noble

Personal details
- Occupation: British Diplomat

Giles Portman is a British diplomat, currently serving as the British ambassador to Romania, since October 2023. Prior to this, his senior roles in the His Majesty's Diplomatic Service include Director for Europe, Director for EU Exit, and Deputy Head of Mission Turkey.

== Early life ==
He was awarded a scholarship at Oxford University and studied Classics and English at Lady Margaret Hall.

== Diplomatic career ==
From 2003-6 he was the United Kingdom's negotiator for EU enlargement, concluding the talks over Bulgaria and Romania's entry to the European Union, and chairing EU negotiations for the start of accession talks with Croatia and Turkey.

From 2011 to 2019 he worked in the European External Action Service. From 2011 to 2015 he was an Adviser to the EU High Representative/Vice President. From 2015 to 2019 he led the East Stratcom Task Force, set up by EU Heads of State and Government to identify, analyse and respond to Russian disinformation. In 2019 East Stratcom's work was recognised through the award of the medal of honour "Diplomacy Star of Lithuania", the highest distinction of the Lithuanian diplomatic service

== Personal life ==
He was a member of the Council of Experts of the Democratic Progress Institute, a London-based NGO focused on conflict resolution, from 2015 to 2019.

He was cited in 2004 in discussions in the Czech Senate over changing the name of the Czech Republic to Czechia in English.

His wife Lucie is the great grand-daughter of Czechoslovak statesman and economist Karel Engliš.

Diplomatic posts
Preceded by Andrew Noble	British Ambassador to Romania; 2023-present	Incumbent
