= Joseph Addison (diplomat) =

British ambassador (1879–1953)

Sir Joseph Addison KCMG (1879 – 24 November 1953) was a British ambassador to the Baltic States, and to Czechoslovakia during the rise of Nazi Germany.

== Career ==
Joseph Addison, son of John Edmund Wentworth Addison, was educated in France and at Magdalen College, Oxford. He entered the Foreign Office (FO) in 1903 and was assistant secretary at the Second Hague Conference in 1907 before being posted to Peking 1908–10. He was Private Secretary to the Parliamentary Under-Secretary of State for Foreign Affairs (Thomas McKinnon Wood then Francis Dyke Acland) 1911–13. He resigned from the FO in 1913 but rejoined and served in Paris 1916–20 before being appointed Counsellor at Berlin 1920–27, serving as chargé d'affaires at various times.

So well did he carry out his duties during the particularly difficult period of the aftermath of the 1914–18 War, when political conditions in Germany were in a state of flux, that he was clearly marked out for promotion.
– The Times, 27 November 1953

Addison was appointed Minister to Latvia, Lithuania and Estonia in 1927 and transferred to be Minister to Czechoslovakia in 1930. The Times obituary said "For the next six years he held this important position and did much to foster good relations with the Czechoslovak government, especially after the seizure of power by the Nazis in Germany in 1933." However, a historian of the period claims that Addison "made virtually no attempt to conceal his contempt for his hosts" and was "very much responsible for cultivating a negative view of the Czechs and their country in British official circles" and that he "disliked Edvard Beneš [Czech Foreign Minister, later President] with considerable passion and took delight in embarrassing him in his reports from Prague." Addison's contempt extended to the Baltic States, which he claimed was "a part of Europe that has no claim to civilization."

In 1936 Addison was appointed Ambassador to Chile, but he did not proceed there and after a few months decided instead to retire.

Addison's obituary in The Times has been quoted above. A few days after its publication, The Times also published two tributes including one from Sir William Seeds who wrote:

His fundamental common sense and his logical intelligence, joined to the social gifts which endeared him to many European figures, such as the younger Masaryk, would surely have brought him to high office but for his decision, on private grounds, to resign prematurely from the service.

Addison was appointed CMG in the New Year Honours of 1924 while he was serving in Berlin, and knighted KCMG in the King's Birthday Honours of 1933.

Diplomatic posts
Preceded by Sir Tudor Vaughan	Envoy Extraordinary and Minister Plenipotentiary to the Republics of Estonia, Latvia, and Lithuania; 1928–1930	Succeeded by Hughe Knatchbull-Hugessen
Preceded by Sir James Macleay	Envoy Extraordinary and Minister Plenipotentiary to the Czechoslovak Republic; 1930–1936	Succeeded by Sir Charles Bentinck
