= Howard William Kennard =

British diplomat (1878–1955)

Sir Howard William Kennard GCMG CVO
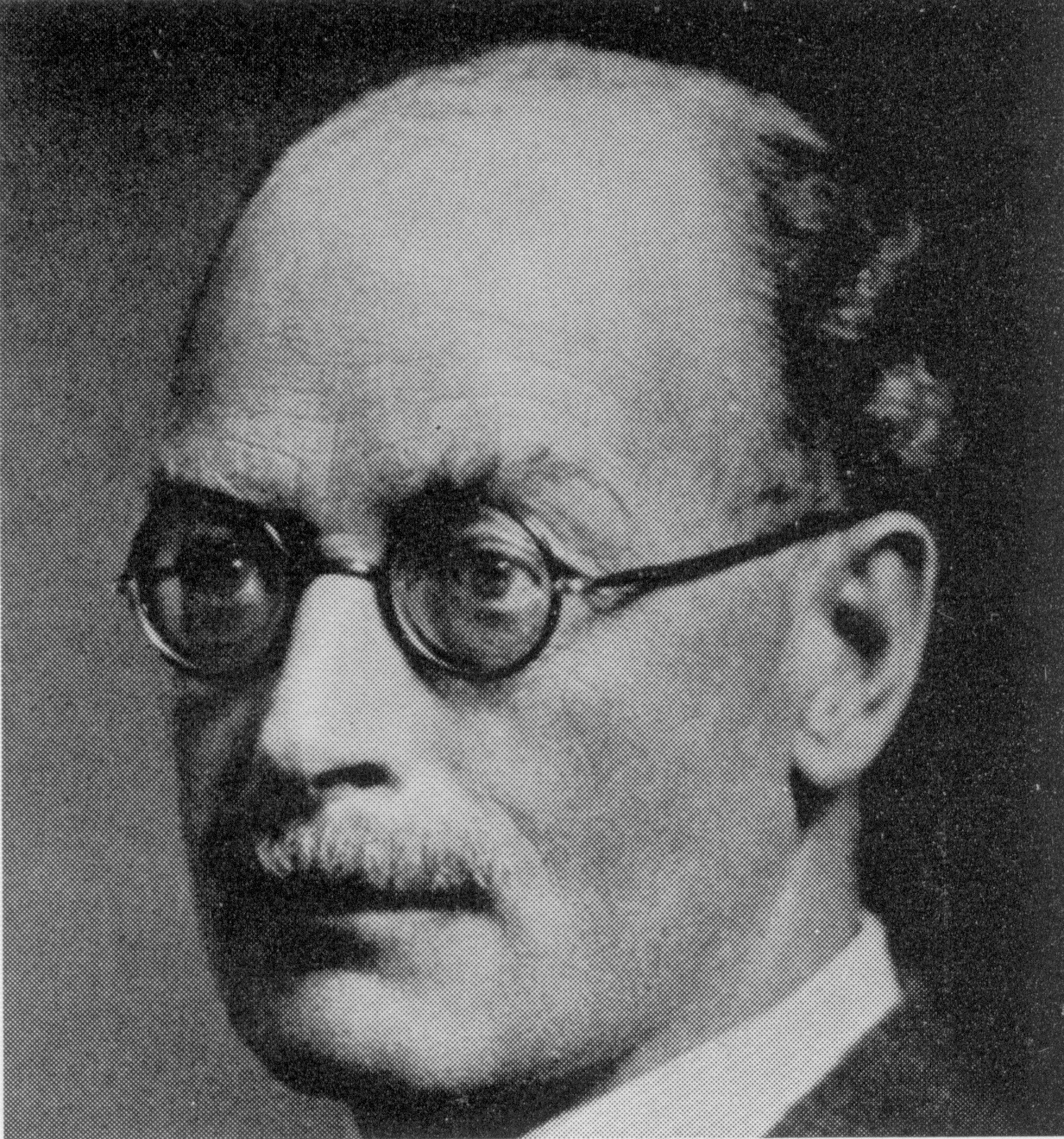
- Born: 23 March 1878; Brighton
- Died: 12 November 1955 (aged 77)
- Occupation: British diplomat

Sir Howard William Kennard GCMG, CVO (23 March 1878 – 12 November 1955) was a British diplomat.

== Early life ==
Kennard was born on 23 March 1878 in Brighton, the son of Arthur Challis Kennard and Anne Homan Mulock, and educated at Wixenford School and Eton College.

== In Poland ==
He was a British Chargé d'affaires, and subsequently Ambassador to Poland until 1939. Despite being pro-Polish, he nevertheless urged Poland to negotiate moderation with Germany. During the Czechoslovak Crisis, he briefed Viscount Halifax on 10 September 1938 by pointing out that "the Poles, especially the ruling classes, do not feel the same horror of Nazism as is felt in democratic countries... among the peasants there is a dislike of Jews which counterbalances the disgust with which other countries regard the manifestations of German anti-Semitism" and that there was a great dislike by Poland towards the Czechs. He made it clear to London, which was then in negotiations with the Soviet Union for a defensive alliance, that Russia was "violently disliked and distrusted in Poland" and that any kind of transit on land or by air to Czecho-Slovakia over Polish territory would be resisted by force of arms.

In March the following year, he gave his support to the Anglo-Polish defensive guarantee, which ultimately drew England into the war. He became ambassador to the Polish government-in-exile until 1941. and was also ambassador to Switzerland and the Kingdom of Yugoslavia.

== Somerset ==
In 1939, Kennard was listed as occupying Langham House, Rode Hill, Somerset.

Diplomatic posts
Preceded by Sir Alban Young	Envoy Extraordinary and Minister Plenipotentiary to the Kingdom of the Serbs, Croats and Slovenes; 1925 – 1929	Succeeded by Neville Meyrick Henderson
Preceded by Claud Russell	Envoy Extraordinary and Minister Plenipotentiary to the Swiss Confederation; 1931 – 1935	Succeeded by George Warner
Preceded by William Erskine	Ambassador of the United Kingdom to Poland; 1937 – 1941	Succeeded by Sir Cecil Dormer

== Bibliography ==
- The Story of Mulock: The Pedigree of the Mulock Family of Ireland by Sir Edmund Thomas Bewley (Ponsonby & Gibbs, 1905)
- By Virtue & Faith: A History of the Mulock & Mullock Families by Robert Hughes-Mullock FRAS (2012)
