= Denis Laskey =

Sir Denis Seward Laskey KCMG CVO (18 January 1916 – 16 October 1987) was a British ambassador to Romania and Austria.

== Career ==
Denis Seward Laskey was educated at Marlborough College and Corpus Christi College, Oxford. He joined the Foreign Office in 1939, served briefly in the British Army 1940–41, then returned to the Foreign Office until the end of the war, when he was posted to Berlin and later to the UK delegation to the United Nations in New York. He was Principal Private Secretary to the Foreign Secretary (Selwyn Lloyd) 1956–59, Minister (second to the Ambassador) at Rome 1960–64, Permanent Under-Secretary at the Cabinet Office 1964–67, Minister at Bonn 1967–68, Ambassador to Romania 1969–71 and Ambassador to Austria 1972–75.

Laskey was appointed CMG in the 1957 New Year Honours , CVO in the 1958 Birthday Honours and knighted KCMG in the 1974 New Year Honours.

Diplomatic posts
Preceded by Patrick Hancock	Principal Private Secretary to the Secretary of State for Foreign Affairs; 1956–1959	Succeeded by Ian Samuel
Preceded by Sir John Chadwick	Ambassador Extraordinary and Plenipotentiary at Bucharest; 1969–1971	Succeeded by Derick Ashe
Preceded by Sir Peter Wilkinson	Ambassador Extraordinary and Plenipotentiary at Vienna; 1972–1975	Succeeded by Hugh Morgan
