= List of diplomats of the United Kingdom to Romania =

The ambassador of the United Kingdom to Romania is the United Kingdom's foremost diplomatic representative in Romania, and head of the UK's diplomatic mission in Romania. The official title is His Britannic Majesty's Ambassador to Romania.

== Heads of mission ==
Consuls-general to Wallachia and Moldavia

- 1813–1826?: William Wilkinson (consul appointed by the Levant Company
- 1826–1834: E.L. Blutte
- 1834–1858: Robert G. Colquhoun
- 1859–1874: John Green
- 1874–1876: Hon. Hussey Vivian
- 1876–1878: Charles Mansfield

Envoys extraordinary and ministers plenipotentiary

- 1880–1886: Sir William White
- 1887–1892: Sir Frank Lascelles
- 1892–1894: Sir John Walsham, 2nd Baronet
- 1894–1897: Sir Hugh Wyndham
- 1897–1905: John Kennedy
- 1906–1910: Conyngham Greene
- 1911–1912: Walter Townley
- 1912–1920: Sir George Barclay
- 1920–1926: Sir Herbert Dering
- 1926–1929: Robert Greg
- 1929–1935: Michael Palairet
- 1935–1941: Sir Reginald Hoare
- 1941–1946: No representation due to World War II
- 1947–1948: Adrian Holman
- 1949–1951: Walter Roberts
- 1951–1954: William Sullivan
- 1954–1956: Dermot MacDermot
- 1956–1959: Alan Dudley
- 1959–1961: David Scott Fox
- 1961–1963: Dalton Murray

Ambassadors extraordinary and plenipotentiary

- 1963–1965: Dalton Murray
- 1965–1967: Leslie Glass
- 1967–1968: Sir John Chadwick
- 1969–1971: Denis Laskey
- 1972–1975: Derick Ashe
- 1975–1977: Jeffrey Petersen
- 1977–1979: Reginald Secondé
- 1980–1983: Paul Holmer
- 1983–1986: Philip McKearney
- 1986–1989: Hugh Arbuthnott
- 1989–1992: Michael Atkinson
- 1992–1996: Andrew Bache
- 1996–2000: Christopher Crabbie
- 2000–2002: Richard Ralph
- 2002–2006: Quinton Quayle
- 2006–2010: Robin Barnett
- 2010–2014: Martin Harris
- 2014–2018: Paul Brummell
- 2018–2023: Andrew Noble
- 2023–present: Giles Portman

== Regional consulates ==
Consuls

- 1922–1924: Lionel Keyser (Consul for the Romanian Old Kingdom, Dobruja, and the portion of Bessarabia south of Orhei and Baltzi)
- 1924-?: Laurence Robinson (Consul-General for Bukowina, Bessarabia, the Romanian Old Kingdom and Dobrudja)
- 1922-?: Charles Goodwin (Consul for Transylvania, the Romanian Banat, Crișana and Maramureș)
- 1935–1939: Archibald Robertson (Consul for Transylvania, the Romanian Banat, Crișana and Maramureș)
- 1939-?: Norman Mayers (for Timiș, Olt, Bucegi, Mureș and Someș)
