= Ernest Rennie =

British diplomat (1868–1935)

Sir Ernest Rennie KCMG MVO

British Ambassador to Finland
- In office 1921–1930
- Preceded by: George Kidston
- Succeeded by: Sir Rowland Sperling

British Ambassador to Peru and Ecuador
- In office 1914–1919
- Preceded by: Charles des Graz
- Succeeded by: Arthur Grant Duff

Personal details
- Born: 12 September 1868
- Died: 25 September 1935 (aged 67) Newbury, Berkshire
- Education: New College, Oxford
- Occupation: Diplomat

Sir Ernest Amelius Rennie (12 September 1868 – 25 September 1935) was a British diplomat who served as ambassador to Peru and Ecuador from 1914 to 1919 and ambassador to Finland from 1921 to 1930.

== Early life and education ==
Rennie was born on 12 September 1868, the eldest son of George Banks Rennie of Denford, Berkshire. He was educated at Eton College and New College, Oxford, where he took a degree in History.

== Career ==
Rennie joined the Diplomatic Service as an attaché in 1892, and was sent to Vienna as third secretary. He then served successively at Sofia (1895); Bucharest (1896); Tehran as second secretary (1897); Vienna (1900); and Washington as Head of Chancery (1905), having been promoted that year to first secretary.

From 1906 to 1908, he was chargé d'affaires at the Legation in Santiago, Chile and then first secretary at the Legation in Lisbon in 1908. From 1908 to 1910, he served as councillor at the Legation in Tehran before he was posted to Madrid. In 1913, he was appointed envoy extraordinary and minister plenipotentiary to Peru and Ecuador, a post he held until 1919 having been extended due to the War. He was then appointed British Commissioner and President of the Inter-Allied Plebiscite Commission based in Allenstein, East Prussia, and was responsible for supervising the plebiscite to decide whether East Prussia would stay in the German Reich or join the Polish Republic. His final post before retiring was as ambassador to Finland from 1921 to 1930.

== Personal life and death ==
Rennie married Esme Helen Winthrop née Smith in 1919.

Rennie died on 25 September 1935 at Newbury, Berkshire, aged 67.

== Honours ==
Rennie was appointed Knight Commander of the Order of St Michael and St George (KCMG) in the 1928 Birthday Honours. He was appointed Member of the Royal Victorian Order in 1903 (MVO).

== See also ==
- Peru–United Kingdom relations
- Finland–United Kingdom relations

Diplomatic posts
Preceded by Charles des Graz	British Ambassador to Peru and Ecuador; 1914–1919	Succeeded by Arthur Grant Duff
Preceded by George Kidston	British Ambassador to Finland; 1921–1930	Succeeded by Sir Rowland Sperling
