= Orion Publishing Group =

British book publisher based in London

- Parent company: Hachette Livre
- Founded: 1991; 35 years ago
- Founder: Anthony Cheetham; Rosemary Cheetham
- Country of origin: United Kingdom
- Headquarters location: London
- Publication types: Books
- Imprints: Weidenfeld & Nicolson, Gollancz, Phoenix, Cassell Military, White Rabbit, Everyman's Library; Everyman's Library has been discontinued.
- Official website: www.orionbooks.co.uk

Orion Publishing Group Ltd is a British book publisher. It was founded in 1991 and acquired Weidenfeld & Nicolson the following year. The group has published books by authors including Ian Rankin, Michael Connelly, Nemir Kirdar, and Quentin Tarantino.

== History ==
Orion Books was launched in 1992, with Orion purchasing the assets of Chapman Publishers the following year. In the same year (1993), Orion acquired a warehousing and distribution centre called Littlehampton Book Services (LBS), which was based in Sussex in the UK. A majority share capital of Orion was sold to Hachette Livre in 1998, before Hachette Livre became the sole owner of the Orion Publishing Group in 2003. In December 1998, Orion acquired publishing house Cassell, whose imprints included Victor Gollancz Ltd. This imprint became a part of the Orion group and Orion also took ownership of the Cassell Military list. After acquiring Hodder Headline, Hachette UK was formed, with Orion as its largest single component.

== Awards ==
Hachette's Orion division won the 2021 British Book Awards "Publisher of The Year" title for outstanding success during the 2020 calendar year. Each of its lists recorded a sharp increase in sales, with eight books topping £1,000,000 in sales. There were bestsellers from Ian Rankin and Michael Connelly in fiction, along with strong sales from Noel Fitzpatrick and Arsène Wenger on the non-fiction side. This financial success, along with "virtual events and effective digital marketing" (Adam Kay's Dear NHS anthology raised nearly £400,000) saw the Orion Group win the publishers' prize in 2021.

== Imprints ==
The group's imprints include:

- Gollancz
- Laurence King Publishing
- Orion Business
- Orion Fiction
- Orion Spring
- Phoenix Books
- Seven Dials
- Trapeze
- Weidenfeld & Nicolson
- White Rabbit

Orion Children's Books is an imprint of Hachette Children's Group.

The group also distributes books for the independent Halban Publishers.

== Distribution ==
Books distributed through Littlehampton Book Services.

== See also ==
- List of largest book publishers of the United Kingdom
- List of publishers of children's books
