= Dalton Murray =

British diplomat

James Dalton Murray

Minister/Ambassador to Romania
- In office 1961–1965
- Monarch: Elizabeth II
- Prime Minister: Harold Macmillan; Alec Douglas-Home; Harold Wilson
- Preceded by: David Scott Fox
- Succeeded by: Leslie Glass

British High Commissioner to Jamaica
- In office 1965–1970
- Monarch: Elizabeth II
- Prime Minister: Harold Macmillan
- Preceded by: Alexander Morley
- Succeeded by: Noel Larmour

Personal details
- Born: 11 March 1911
- Died: 4 June 1984 (aged 73)

James Dalton Murray CMG (6 March 1911 – 4 June 1984) was a British diplomat who ended his career as High Commissioner to Jamaica with additional responsibility for Haiti.

== Education ==
Murray was educated at Edinburgh Academy, Stowe School and Magdalene College, Cambridge.

== Career ==
Murray entered HM Consular Service in 1933. His first posts were in San Francisco and Mexico City. He was 2nd Secretary at the British Embassy in Washington then 1st Secretary and Consul at La Paz. In 1943 he joined the Office of the Commissioner-General for South East Asia in Singapore. Subsequently, Murray was Deputy High Commissioner in Karachi; Counsellor in Lisbon; and Minister to Romania. He was British High Commissioner in Jamaica from 1965 to 1970; and non-resident Ambassador to Haiti from 1966 to 1970, and resident First Secretary and Consul from 1970 to 1976.

Diplomatic posts
| Preceded by Antony Smith | Minister/Ambassador to Romania; 1961–1965 | Succeeded by Alexander Morley |
| Preceded by Alexander Morley | British High Commissioner to Jamaica; 1965–1970 | Succeeded by Noel Larmour |
