= List of ambassadors of the United Kingdom to Hungary =

The ambassador of the United Kingdom to Hungary is the United Kingdom's foremost diplomatic representative in Hungary, and head of the UK's diplomatic mission in Budapest.

== Heads of mission ==
=== Austro-Hungarian Empire ===
During the Austro-Hungarian Empire, the United Kingdom was represented by an Ambassador in Vienna and a Consul-General at the Hungarian capital of Budapest.

Consul-General

- 1899–1902: Conway Thornton
- 1902–1903: Arthur James Herbert

=== Envoys extraordinary and ministers plenipotentiary to Hungary ===
- 1921–1924: Thomas Hohler
- 1924–1928: Sir Colville Barclay
- 1928–1933: Aretas Akers-Douglas, 2nd Viscount Chilston
- 1933–1935: Sir Patrick Ramsay
- 1935–1939: Geoffrey Knox
- 1941–1947: No representation due to World War II
- 1947–1949: Sir Knox Helm
- 1949–1951: Sir Geoffrey Wallinger
- 1951–1953: The Hon. Robert Hankey
- 1953–1955: Sir George Labouchère
- 1955–1959: Sir Leslie Fry
- 1959–1961: Nicolas Cheetham
- 1961–1963: Sir Ivor Pink

=== Ambassadors extraordinary and plenipotentiary to Hungary ===
- 1963–1965: Sir Ivor Pink
- 1965–1967: Sir Alexander Morley
- 1967–1969: Sir Guy Millard
- 1970–1973: Derek Dodson
- 1973–1976: The Hon. John Wilson
- 1976–1979: Richard Parsons
- 1980–1983: Bryan Cartledge
- 1983–1986: Peter Unwin
- 1986–1989: Leonard Appleyard
- 1989–1995: Sir John Birch
- 1995–1998: Christopher Long
- 1998–2003: Nigel Thorpe
- 2003–2007: John Nichols
- 2007–2011: Gregory Dorey
- 2012–2015: Jonathan Knott
- 2015–2016: Theresa Bubbear (chargé d'affaires ad interim)
- 2016–2020: Iain Lindsay
- 2020–2025: Paul Fox
- 2025—present: Justin McKenzie Smith
