= Andrew Noble (diplomat) =

British diplomat

Andrew Noble LVO
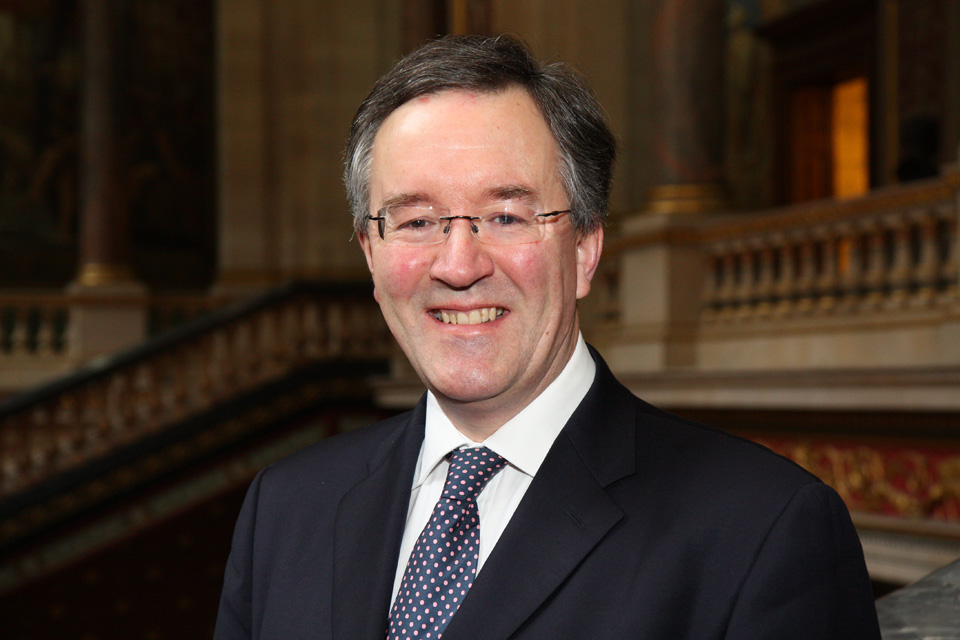

British Ambassador to Romania
- In office August 2018 – October 2023
- Monarchs: Elizabeth II; Charles III
- Prime Minister: Theresa May; Boris Johnson; Liz Truss; Rishi Sunak
- Preceded by: Paul Brummell
- Succeeded by: Giles Portman

British Ambassador to Algeria
- In office June 2014 – 2017
- Monarch: Elizabeth II
- Prime Minister: David Cameron; Theresa May
- Preceded by: Martyn Roper
- Succeeded by: Barry Lowen

Personal details
- Born: Andrew James Noble
- Spouse: Helen Natalie Noble
- Children: 4

Andrew James Noble LVO is a British diplomat who was the British Ambassador to Romania from 2018 to 2023, previously having served as the British Ambassador to Algeria. He joined the Foreign and Commonwealth Office (FCO) in 1982, and has also worked in Germany, South Africa and Greece.

== Career ==
Noble joined the FCO in 1982. From 1983 to 1986 he served as the third and later second political secretary in Bucharest. He subsequently served as the deputy head of mission in Berlin.

In June 2014 he took over from Martyn Roper as the Ambassador to Algeria. During his tenure as Ambassador, he was criticised after he was photographed wearing shorts while visiting a mosque.

He was named the Ambassador to Romania in succession to Paul Brummell and took up his appointment in August 2018. Noble mediated a dispute over Bucharest Pride 2021, enabling the march to take place along its traditional route. He commented, "A country where minorities don't have rights is a country full of fear".

== Personal life ==
He is married to Helen Natalie Pugh Noble and has four children. He has adopted a bear from a Romanian bear sanctuary.

Diplomatic posts
Preceded by Martyn Roper	British Ambassador to Algeria; 2014–2017	Succeeded by Barry Lowen
Preceded by Paul Brummell	British Ambassador to Romania; 2018–2023	Succeeded by Giles Portman
