= Con O'Neill (diplomat) =

British diplomat

The Honourable Sir Con O'Neill GCMG
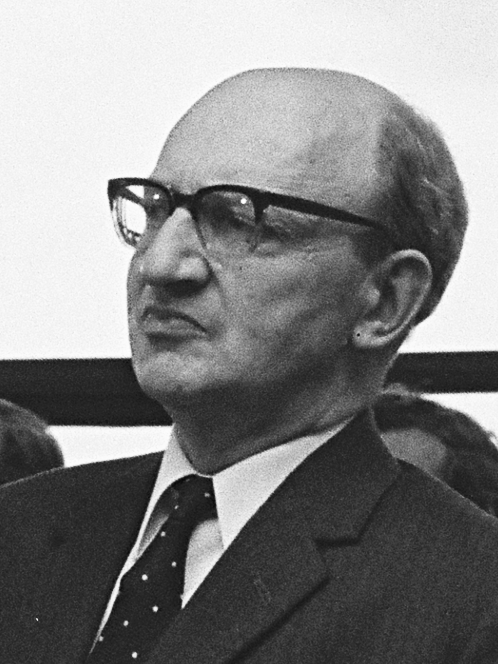
- O'Neil in 1970

British Representative to the European Economic Community
- In office 1963 – 1965

British Ambassador to China
- In office 1955 – 1957
- Prime Minister: Harold Macmillan
- Preceded by: Humphrey Trevelyan
- Succeeded by: Duncan Wilson

British Ambassador to Finland
- In office 1961 – 1963
- Prime Minister: Anthony Eden
- Preceded by: Douglas Busk
- Succeeded by: Anthony Lambert

Personal details
- Born: Con Douglas Walter O'Neill; 3 June 1912
- Died: 11 January 1988 (aged 75)
- Children: Onora O'Neill
- Parent: Hugh O'Neill, 1st Baron Rathcavan (father)
- Education: Eton College
- Alma mater: Balliol College, Oxford

Military service
- Allegiance: United Kingdom
- Branch: British Army
- Years of service: 1939–1943
- Unit: Intelligence Corps; Political Warfare Executive
- War: World War II

Sir Con Douglas Walter O'Neill GCMG (3 June 1912 – 11 January 1988) was a British civil servant and diplomat. He was the British Ambassador to China (1955–1957) and the British Ambassador to Finland (1961–1963). He was also the British representative to the European Economic Community from 1963 to 1965 and led the British delegation which negotiated the country's entry to the EEC.

O'Neill was the second son of an Ulster Unionist MP, Hugh O'Neill, 1st Baron Rathcavan. He studied first at Eton College, then at Balliol College, Oxford. He gained a fellowship at All Souls College, Oxford, in 1935 before joining the Diplomatic Service in 1936.

In 1939, with the outbreak of the Second World War, he entered the Army Intelligence Corps. He joined the German Section of the Political Warfare Executive, during which time he interrogated Adolf Hitler's former deputy, Rudolf Hess. He left the army for the Foreign Office in 1943. During 1946 and 1947 he was a leader writer for The Times. He re-entered the foreign service in 1948.

O'Neill died on 11 January 1988. His daughter Onora is now Baroness O'Neill of Bengarve.
