= List of ambassadors of the United Kingdom to Cuba =

The ambassador of the United Kingdom to Cuba is the United Kingdom's foremost diplomatic representative in the Republic of Cuba, and head of the UK's diplomatic mission in Cuba. His or her official title is His Britannic Majesty's Ambassador to the Republic of Cuba.

== List of heads of mission ==
=== Consuls-general in the Island of Cuba ===
- 1833–1840: Charles David Tolmé
- 1840–1842: David Turnbull
- 1842–1864: Joseph T. Crawford
- 1864–1865: Robert Bunch
- 1865–1868: William Synge
- 1868–1876: Alexander G. Dunlop
- 1876–1879: Henry A. Cowper
- 1880–1892: Sir Arthur de Capel Crowe
- 1892–1898: Sir Alexander Gollan
- 1898–1902: Lionel Carden

=== Ministers resident to the Republic of Cuba ===
- 1902–1906: Lionel Carden
- 1906–1909: Arthur Grant Duff
- 1909–1912: Stephen Leech

=== Envoys extraordinary and ministers plenipotentiary to the Republic of Cuba ===
- 1912–1919: Stephen Leech (also to Haiti and Dominican Republic from 1913)
- 1919–1921: William Erskine

=== Chargé d'affaires in Cuba ===
- 1921–1924: Godfrey Haggard
- 1924–1925: Thomas Morris

=== Envoys extraordinary and ministers plenipotentiary to the Republic of Cuba ===
- 1925–1931: Thomas Morris
- 1931–1933: Sir John Broderick
- 1933–1935: Herbert Grant Watson
- 1935–1937: Thomas Maitland Snow
- 1937–1940: Herbert Grant Watson
- 1940–1944: Sir George Ogilvie-Forbes
- 1944–1949: James Leishman Dodds
- 1949–1950: Adrian Holman

=== Ambassadors extraordinary and plenipotentiary to the Republic of Cuba ===
- 1950–1954: Adrian Holman
- 1954–1956: Wilfred Hansford Gallienne
- 1956–1960: Stanley Fordham
- 1960–1963: Herbert Stanley Marchant
- 1963–1966: Adam Watson
- 1966–1970: Richard Slater
- 1970–1972: Richard Sykes
- 1972–1975: Stanley Fingland
- 1975–1979: Edward Jackson
- 1979–1981: John Ure
- 1981–1984: David Churchill Thomas
- 1984–1986: Robin Fearn
- 1986–1989: Andrew Palmer
- 1989–1991: David Brighty
- 1991–1994: Leycester Coltman
- 1994–1998: Philip Alexander McLean
- 1998–2001: David Ridgway
- 2001–2004: Paul Webster Hare
- 2004–2008: John Dew
- 2008–2012: Dianna Melrose
- 2012–2016: Tim Cole
- 2016–2022: Antony Stokes
- 2022–2025: Sir George Hollingbery
- 2025-present: James Hooley
