= Bernard Ledwidge =

British diplomat and writer (1915–1998)

Sir Bernard Ledwidge KCMG

British Ambassador to Israel
- In office 1972–1975
- Monarch: Elizabeth II
- Preceded by: Sir Ernest John Ward Barnes
- Succeeded by: Anthony Elliott

British Ambassador to Finland
- In office 1969–1972
- Monarch: Elizabeth II
- Preceded by: Sir David Scott Fox
- Succeeded by: Anthony Elliott

Personal details
- Born: William Bernard John Ledwidge; 9 November 1915 London, England
- Died: 20 February 1998 (aged 82) London, England
- Spouses: Anne Kingsley (1948–1970); Flora Groult (1970–)
- Education: King's College, Cambridge; Princeton University

Sir William Bernard John Ledwidge, KCMG (9 November 1915 – 20 February 1998) was a British diplomat and writer. Ledwidge served as the British Ambassador to Finland from 1969 to 1972 and the British Ambassador to Israel from 1972 to 1975. Ledwidge also served as the Chairman of the United Kingdom Committee for UNICEF from 1976 to 1989.

== Early life ==
William Bernard John Ledwidge was born on 9 November 1915 in London, United Kingdom to Charles Ledwidge and Eileen O'Sullivan.

Ledwidge was educated at Cardinal Vaughan School, a Roman Catholic day school in Holland Park, London. Ledwidge also attended King's College, Cambridge and Princeton University. He spent time as a Commonwealth Fund Fellow from 1937 to 1939.

== Career ==
Ledwidge joined the India Office in 1939 as an Assistant Principal.

=== Military service ===
Ledwidge fought in the Second World War, joining the Royal Artillery in India in 1940. He then joined the Indian Army in 1941, where he served until the end of the war in 1945.

Ledwidge was appointed a Companion of the Order of St Michael and St George (CMG) in 1964.

=== Diplomatic career ===
Ledwidge pursued a career in international diplomacy. He worked as a diplomat in the United States, in Afghanistan and in Berlin. In 1966, he was appointed Minister at the British Embassy in Paris. He remained in this position until 1969.

=== Ambassador to Finland ===
Ledwidge was appointed the British Ambassador to Finland in 1969, succeeding Sir David Scott Fox.

Upon leaving this appointment in 1972, he is reported to have said "it could plausibly be argued that it is a misfortune for anybody but a Finn to spend three years in Finland, as I have just done".

=== Ambassador to Israel ===
Ledwidge was appointed the British Ambassador to Israel in 1972, succeeding Anthony Elliott.

He was raised to a Knight Commander of the Order of St Michael and St George (KCMG) in 1974.

On 15 June 1975, the Israeli Foreign Minister, Yigal Allon, summoned Ledwidge to raise concern over reports of impending Anglo-Egyptian arms deals.

He left this appointment in 1975.

He was then Chairman of the United Kingdom Committee for UNICEF from 1976 to 1989.

=== Writing ===
Ledwidge published his first book, a novel based on his experience in India, called "Frontiers" in 1979.

In 1983, he published a biography of Charles de Gaulle. Critics noted the author's admiration for the French statesman. A French translation of this book was published the following year.

== Death ==
Ledwidge died on 20 February 1998 in London, United Kingdom.

== Personal life ==
Ledwidge married his first wife, Anne Kingsley, in 1948. They had two children together, a son and a daughter. The marriage was dissolved in 1970. He married his second wife, Flora Groult, in 1970. He was a member of the Travellers Club and the Marylebone Cricket Club.

== See also ==
- Finland-United Kingdom relations
- Israel–United Kingdom relations

Diplomatic posts
Preceded by David Scott Fox	Her Britannic Majesty's Ambassador to the Republic of Finland; 1969–1972	Succeeded by Anthony Elliott
Preceded by Ernest John Ward Barnes	Her Britannic Majesty's Ambassador to the State of Israel; 1972–1975	Succeeded by Thomas Anthony Keith Elliott
