= Milne Cheetham =

British diplomat

Sir Milne Cheetham

British Envoy Extraordinary and Minister Plenipotentiary to Denmark
- In office 1926–1928

British Ambassador to Greece
- In office 1924–1926

British Ambassador to Switzerland
- In office 1922–1924

Acting British High Commissioner to Egypt
- In office December 1914 – January 1915
- Monarch: George V
- Preceded by: Herbert Kitchener
- Succeeded by: Henry McMahon

Personal details
- Born: 9 July 1869 Preston, Lancashire, England
- Died: 6 January 1938 (aged 68)
- Spouse(s): Anastasia Muravieva (m. 1907; div. 1923) Cynthia Seymour (m. 1923)
- Children: Nicolas Cheetham
- Parent: Joshua Milne Cheetham (father)
- Education: Christ Church, Oxford

Sir Joshua Milne Crompton Cheetham KCMG (9 July 1869 – 6 January 1938) was a British diplomat.

== Biography ==
Born in Preston, the son of Joshua Milne Cheetham, MP, he was educated at Rossall School, from which he won a scholarship to Christ Church, Oxford. He studied classics at Oxford, after which he entered the diplomatic service. He served in Madrid, Paris, Tokyo, Berlin, Rome and Rio de Janeiro before being sent to Cairo in January 1910. When the United Kingdom declared its protectorate over Egypt in December 1914, he became acting High Commissioner, pending the arrival of Sir Henry McMahon. He took charge of the British Residency during the spring and fall of 1919, and thus had to confront the 1919 Revolution.

He later served in the British embassy in Paris, and was appointed minister to Switzerland in 1922. In 1924, he was appointed minister to Greece, after a two-year break in diplomatic relations. He was sent to Denmark in 1926, and retired in 1928.

== Family ==
Sir Milne Cheetham married twice. His first wife was Anastasia Muravieva (aka Mouravieff) CBE (died 1976), stepdaughter of Nikolay Muraviev, the Russian Empire's Minister of Justice and later ambassador to Italy. They married in 1907 and divorced in 1923.

They had one son, Nicolas (1910–2002), who followed in his father's footsteps and went on to have a successful career in the diplomatic service.

Cheetham's second wife was Cynthia Charlette Seymour (d. 1968), whom he married on 11 July 1923. She was the daughter of Sir Horace Alfred Damer Seymour and Elizabeth Mary Romilly.

== Decorations ==
Sir Milne Cheetham received the King George V Coronation Medal in 1911, was appointed a Companion of the Order of St Michael and St George (CMG) in the 1912 New Year Honours, and was promoted to Knight Commander of the Order (KCMG) in 1915.

Diplomatic posts
Preceded by Herbert Kitchener as Agent and Consul-General	Acting British High Commissioner to Egypt; December 1914 – January 1915	Succeeded by Sir Henry McMahon as High Commissioner
Preceded by Hon. Odo Russell	British Envoy Extraordinary and Minister Plenipotentiary to Switzerland; 1922–1924	Succeeded by Rowland Sperling
Suspended Break in diplomatic relations Title last held by Sir Francis Lindley	British Envoy Extraordinary and Minister Plenipotentiary to Greece; 1924–1926	Succeeded by Sir Percy Loraine
Preceded by Earl Granville	British Envoy Extraordinary and Minister Plenipotentiary to Denmark; 1926–1928	Succeeded by Sir Thomas Hohler
