= Ivor Pink =

British diplomat (1910–1966)

Sir Ivor Pink KCMG

British Ambassador to Hungary
- In office 1961–1965
- Preceded by: Sir Nicholas Cheetham
- Succeeded by: Sir Alexander Morley

British Ambassador to Chile
- In office 1958–1961
- Preceded by: Sir Charles Empson
- Succeeded by: Sir David Scott Fox

Personal details
- Born: 9 September 1910
- Died: 28 January 1966 (aged 55)
- Children: 1
- Education: New College, Oxford
- Occupation: Diplomat

Sir Ivor Thomas Montague Pink (9 September 1910 – 28 January 1966) was a British diplomat who served as ambassador to Chile from 1958 to 1961 and ambassador to Hungary from 1961 to 1965.

== Early life and education ==
Pink was born on 9 September 1910, the son of Leonard and Ethel Pink. He was educated at Uppingham School and New College, Oxford.

== Career ==
Pink entered the Foreign Office in 1934 as third secretary and his first posting was to Tehran in 1938 where he learnt Persian. The following year, he was promoted to second secretary and returned to London in 1940. He served on the secretariat of the European Advisory Commission for six months, and was promoted to first secretary in 1944. In 1945, he was transferred to the Allied Control Commission for Germany at Berlin as deputy chief of the political division with rank of counsellor.

Pink was posted to Tokyo in 1948 as counsellor, and acted as chargé d’affaires in 1948 and 1949. After a year spent at the Canadian National Defence College at Kingston, Ontario, he was appointed deputy to the permanent United Kingdom representative on the Organisation for European Economic Co-operation (OEEC) in Paris with the rank of minister in 1950, and led the delegation in succeeding years. In 1953, he was seconded to the Ministry of Defence as a senior civilian instructor at the Imperial Defence College.

After serving as assistant under-secretary of state from 1954, Pink was appointed ambassador extraordinary and plenipotentiary to Chile and remained in the post from 1958 to 1961 while also serving as consul-general there from 1959. From 1961 to 1963, he was envoy extraordinary and minister plenipotentiary at the legation in Budapest and then, when it was upgraded to an Embassy, ambassador to Hungary from 1963 to 1965. During his tenure, relations between the UK and Hungary improved significantly.

In 1965, he returned to London and while awaiting his next posting his health declined and he died the following year.

== Personal life and death ==
Pink married Dora Elizabeth Hall (née Tottenham) in 1950 whom he met during his posting in Ontario, widow of Lieutenant B. E. Hall, and they had a daughter.

Pink died on 28 January 1966, aged 55.

== Honours ==
Pink was appointed Companion of the Order of St Michael and St George (CMG) in the 1953 Coronation Honours, and promoted to Knight Commander (KCMG) in the 1963 Birthday Honours.

== See also ==
- Chile–United Kingdom relations
- Hungary–United Kingdom relations

Diplomatic posts
Preceded by Sir Charles Empson	British Ambassador to Chile; 1958–1961	Succeeded by Sir David Scott Fox
Preceded by Sir Nicholas Cheetham	British Ambassador to Hungary; 1961–1965	Succeeded by Sir Alexander Morley
