= Sir Alban Young, 9th Baronet =

British diplomat (1865–1944)

Sir Alban Young Bt KCMG MVO

Envoy Extraordinary and Minister Plenipotentiary to His Majesty the King of the Serbs, Croats and Slovenes
- In office 1919–1925
- Preceded by: Charles Louis des Graz
- Succeeded by: Howard William Kennard

Envoy Extraordinary and Minister Plenipotentiary to the Republics of Guatemala, Honduras, Nicaragua and Salvador
- In office 1913–1919
- Preceded by: Sir Lionel Carden
- Succeeded by: Hugh Gaisford

Personal details
- Born: 18 November 1865 Kensington, London, England
- Died: 2 March 1944 (aged 78) Oxford, England
- Occupation: Diplomat

Sir Charles Alban Young, 9th Baronet KCMG MVO (18 November 1865 – 2 March 1944) was a British diplomat.

== Biography ==
Young was the son of the playwright Sir Charles Lawrence Young Bt and Mary Florence Toulmin. He entered Her Majesty's Diplomatic Service, serving in Athens and becoming the British Councillor in Tehran in 1910, serving there until 1913. He was then appointed Minister to Guatemala and other countries in Central America between 1913 and 1919. His final posting was as Minister to Serbia from 1919 to 1925. Young inherited his brother's baronetcy in 1921. He was invested as a Knight Commander of the Order of St Michael and St George and as a Member of the Royal Victorian Order.

He married Clara Elliot, daughter of Sir Francis Elliot, on 18 July 1908. His only son, William, was killed in Libya during the Second World War and Young was succeeded in the baronetcy by his grandson.

== Sources ==
- Young, Sir (Charles) Alban, Who Was Who, A & C Black, 1920–2014; online edn, Oxford University Press, April 2014

Baronetage of Great Britain
Preceded by Sir William Lawrence Young	Baronet (of North Dean); 1921–1944	Succeeded by William Neil Young
