= Flora Groult =

Flora Groult (1924 – 2001) was a French writer.

== Biography ==
=== Early life ===
Flora was born in the 7th arrondissement of Paris on May 23, 1924. Her father, André Groult (1884–1966) was an interior designer and her mother, Nicole Groult (1887–1967) was an Art Deco fashion designer. Flora and her older sister, Benoîte Groult (1920–2016) were raised in the Parisian upper class.

=== Career ===
Flora took a strong interest in visual art and after attending the Lycée Victor Duruy, she studied at the art school, Académie Jullian. She worked as a journalist for the Connaissance des arts and Elle magazine.

Together with her sister, Flora co-authored a novel Le Journal à quatre mains, published in 1962. The sisters collaborated by combining excerpts from their personal journals written many years earlier at the request of their mother. She and her sister decided to co-author two other highly successful books - Le Féminin Pluriel (1965) and Il était deux fois (1968). They also collaborated on a children's book, Histoire de Fidèle (1976), where Benoîte Groult wrote the text and Flora created the illustrations.

Flora published various other books without her sister including: Maxime ou la Déchirure (1972) and Le Passé Infini (1984), Tout le plaisir des jours est dans leurs matinées (1957), Le temps s'en va, madame (1986), Marie Laurencin (1987), Ni tout à fait la même, ni tout à fait une autre (1993) and Un seul ennemi, les jours raccourcissent (1993).

=== Private life ===
Flora married Michael Pringle and together they had 2 children: Colombe and Vanessa Pringle. After he died in 1981, she married her second husband, Sir Bernard Ledwidge. He died in 1998.

Flora suffered from Alzheimer's disease and died from a heart attack in 2001, at the age of 77.
