= Richard Sykes (diplomat) =

British diplomat (1920–1979)

Sir Richard Sykes KCMG, MC
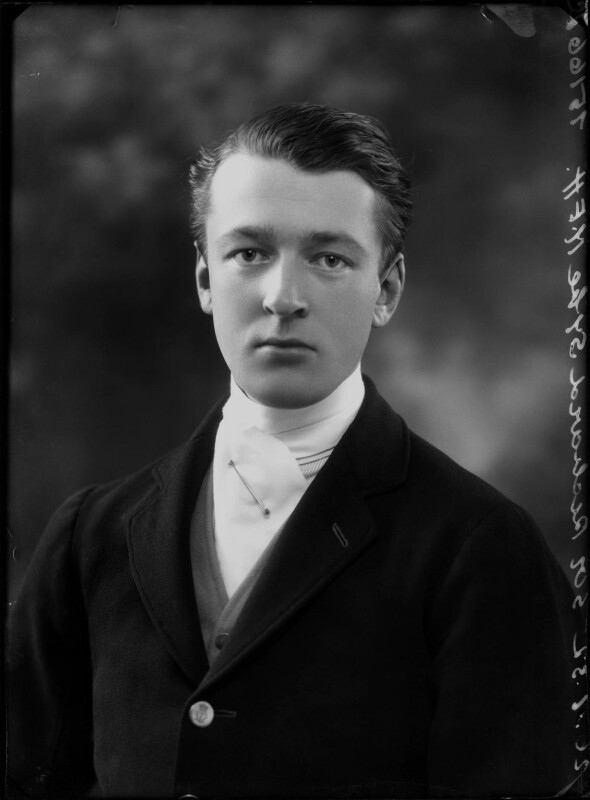
- Sykes in 1932

British Ambassador to the Netherlands
- In office June 1977 – 22 March 1979
- Monarch: Elizabeth II
- Prime Minister: James Callaghan
- Preceded by: Sir John Barnes
- Succeeded by: Sir Jock Taylor

Personal details
- Born: 8 May 1920 Brentford, Middlesex, England
- Died: 22 March 1979 (aged 58) The Hague, Netherlands
- Spouse: Ann Georgina Fisher (m. 1953)
- Education: Wellington College
- Alma mater: Christ Church, Oxford
- Profession: Diplomat

Military service
- Allegiance: United Kingdom
- Branch/service: British Army
- Years of service: 1940–1946
- Rank: Major
- Unit: Royal Corps of Signals
- Battles/wars: Second World War
- Awards: Knight Commander of the Order of St Michael and St George; Military Cross; Croix de Guerre (France)

Sir Richard Adam Sykes, KCMG, MC (8 May 1920 – 22 March 1979) was the British ambassador to the Netherlands, who was assassinated by the IRA in The Hague in 1979 during The Troubles.

== Early life ==
Richard Sykes was born on 8 May 1920 to Brigadier A. C. Sykes. He was educated at Wellington College and Christ Church, University of Oxford.

== Second World War ==
During the Second World War, Sykes served in the British Army with the Royal Signals from 1940 to 1946, attaining the rank of major. In 1945 he was awarded the Military Cross as well as the French Croix de Guerre.

== Diplomatic career ==
Sykes joined HM Foreign Service in 1947, and initially served at the Foreign Office (1947–48). He then served in Nanking (1948–50) and Peking (1950–52), then returned to the UK to serve at the Foreign Office (1952–56). His next overseas postings took him to Brussels (1956–59), Santiago (1959–62), and Athens (1963–66), before returning to the Foreign Office (1967–69).

Sykes' first posting as an ambassador came with a posting to Havana (1970–72), before moving to be a Minister at the British Embassy in Washington D.C. (1972–75). From there he returned to the Foreign Office as Department Under-Secretary between 1975 and 1977. Sykes was then appointed as Ambassador to the Netherlands in 1977.

== Assassination ==
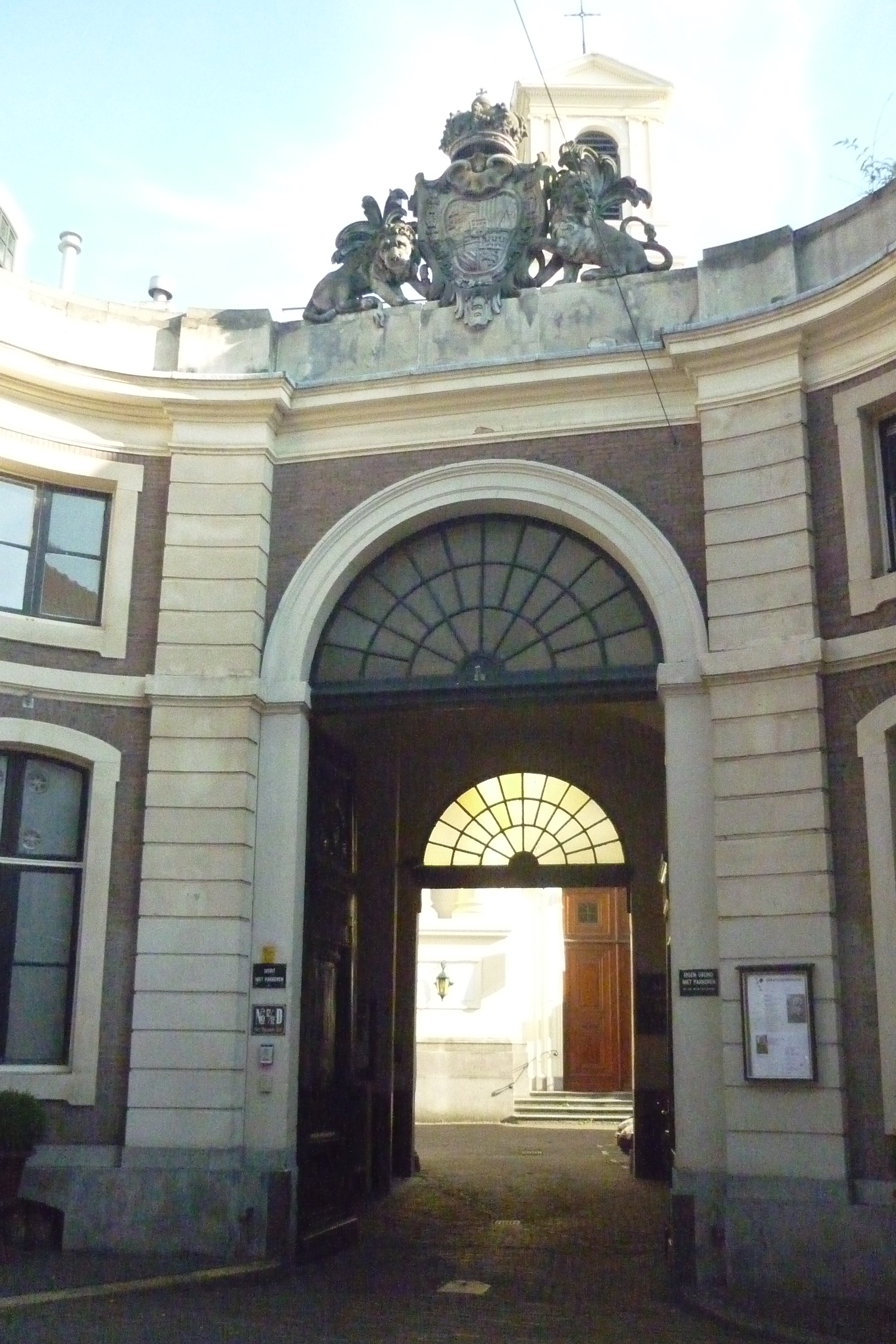
Place of assassination of Richard Sykes, at the Westeinde in The Hague. Inside the gate, to the left, was the door from which Sykes exited his residence. The door to his Rolls-Royce Silver Shadow was being held open by his Dutch valet Karel Straub. At that moment, two gunmen fired eight shots from the street (front) at both Sykes and Straub.

Sykes left his residence in The Hague at 09:00 on 22 March 1979 and was getting into his silver Rolls-Royce limousine when he was shot. Already in the car was a civil servant, Alyson Bailes. The car door was held by Karel Straub, a 19-year-old Dutch national, who worked at the embassy; he was also shot in the attack.

Sykes' chauffeur, Jack Wilson, was uninjured and reversed the car to Westeinde Hospital (at the other end of the one-way street), where Sykes died two hours later. Straub was transported by ambulance to the same hospital, where he also died.

Police reported that the shots came from around 10 m (10 yd) away, fired by two men wearing business suits, who escaped on foot following the attack. Later that day, André Michaux, a senior bank official from Belgium, was murdered outside his home in Brussels in a case of mistaken identity; Sir John Killick – British Deputy Ambassador to NATO, who lived opposite Michaux – was believed to be the intended target of the IRA.

Suspects for the assassination were Palestinians or Iraqis, although no evidence was ever put forward. It was ultimately confirmed that the IRA had carried out the killings. The IRA claimed responsibility for the assassination in February 1980. In a statement they said of Sykes: "[he was] not just a Brit propagandist, as are all British ambassadors, but because he had been engaged in intelligence operations against our organisation."

The 'intelligence operations' mentioned in the statement related to a government report written by Sykes following the assassination of Christopher Ewart-Biggs, British ambassador to the Republic of Ireland, who was killed by the IRA in 1976. Sykes produced diplomatic security guidelines as part of his report.

Sykes' position as Ambassador to the Netherlands had been strained due to certain Dutch groups, which were sympathetic to the IRA, and consequent arms smuggling activities.

== Family ==
Sykes was married to Ann, Lady Sykes (née Fisher). The couple had three children. Lady Sykes died in 2018.

== Memorials ==
There is a memorial plaque to Sykes in St Michael's Church, Wilsford, Wiltshire.

== See also ==
- List of ambassadors of the United Kingdom to the Netherlands

Diplomatic posts
Preceded by Sir John Barnes	United Kingdom Ambassador to the Netherlands; 1977–1979	Succeeded by Sir John Taylor
