= Cuba–United Kingdom relations =

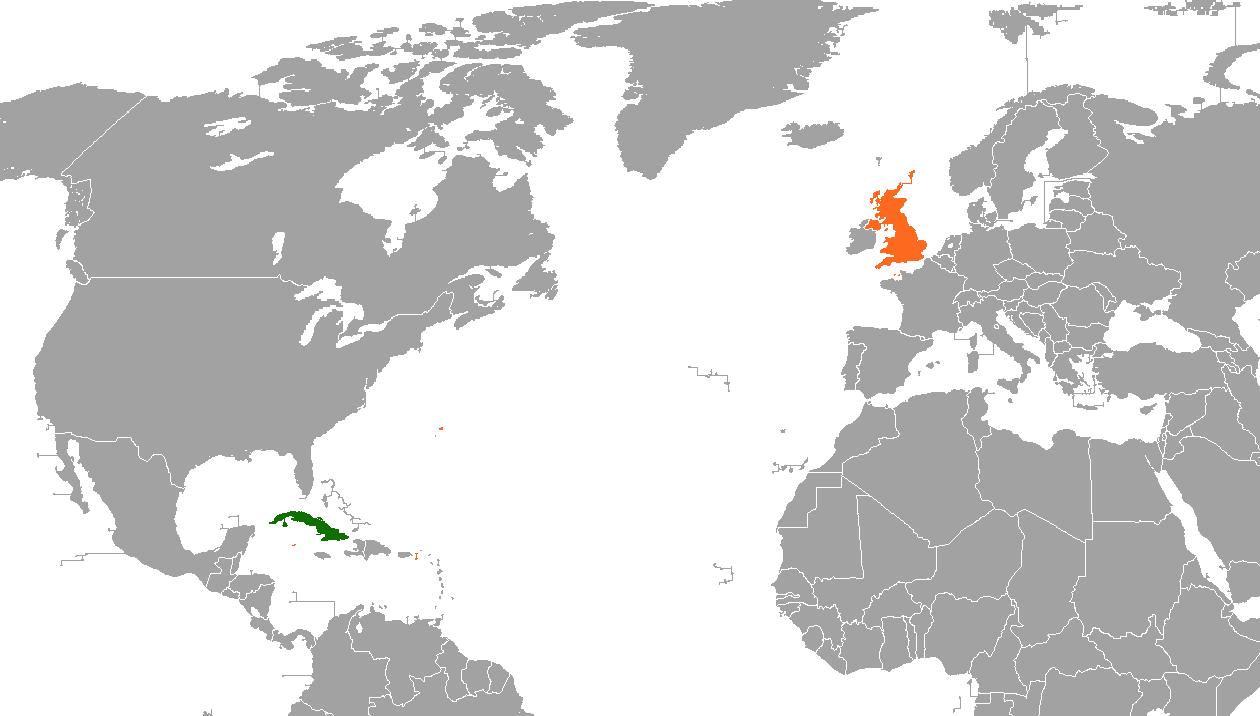

- Cuba: United Kingdom

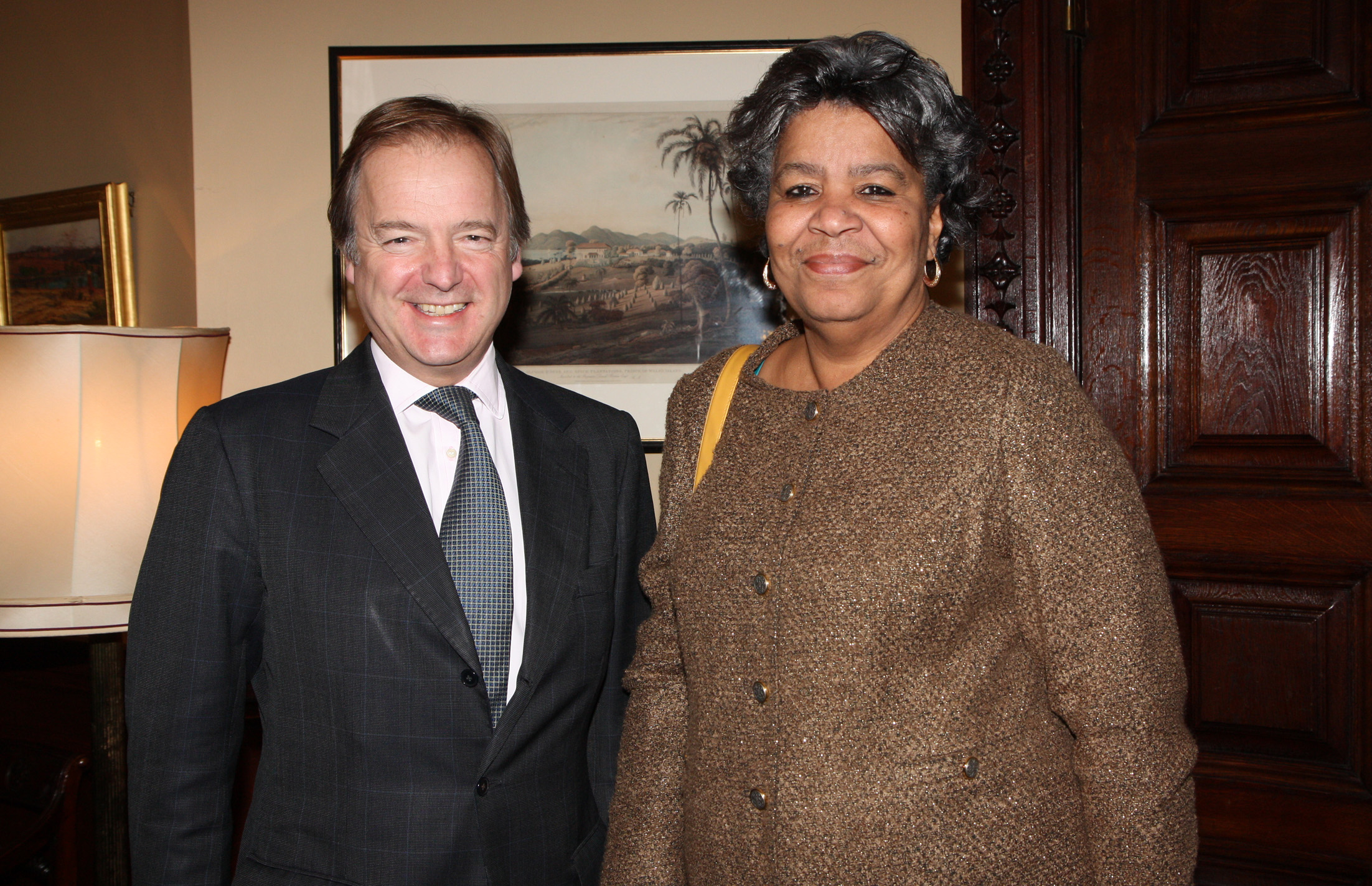
Foreign Office Minister Hugo Swire with Cuban Ambassador to the UK Esther Gloria Armenteros Cárdenas in London, December 2012.

Cuba and the United Kingdom maintain bilateral relations. The two countries established diplomatic relations on 20 May 1902. Both countries share common membership of the World Trade Organization. Bilaterally the two countries have an Investment Agreement, and a Political Dialogue and Co-operation Agreement.

== History ==
The United Kingdom established diplomatic links with Cuba following their independence from Spain in 1902 with the diplomatic link remaining unbroken. In 2019, Charles, Prince of Wales and Camilla, Duchess of Cornwall made history by becoming the first members of the royal family to visit Cuba in an official capacity. In 2021, Cuba and the UK announced intentions to strengthen their bilateral relations.

== Trade ==
In 1964, Cuba ordered ten diesel-electric locomotives similar to the British Rail Class 47 from a British manufacturer.

== Cultural relations ==
=== Sports ===
Cricket has some history of being played in Cuba before the mid-20th century, when baseball grew as part of the overall American influence in the Caribbean. In 1928, Sir Julien Cahn brought his cricket team to Havana to promote cricket and donated a trophy competed for up until the Cuban Revolution, whereafter baseball was promoted as mandatory in schools over cricket. At the turn of the 21st century, support was given by the British Foreign Office and UK Sport to bring cricket to Cuba; Fidel Castro, the leader of Cuba at the time, saw cricket as a possible way to distance Cuba from the United States. The British started sending coaches to Cuba following them joining the International Cricket Council in 2002. In 2006, the Mayor of London, Ken Livingstone attended a Cuban cricket match as part of a stop-over on his way to visit Venezuela.

== Resident diplomatic missions ==
Cuba has an embassy in London. whilst the United Kingdom has an embassy in Havana.

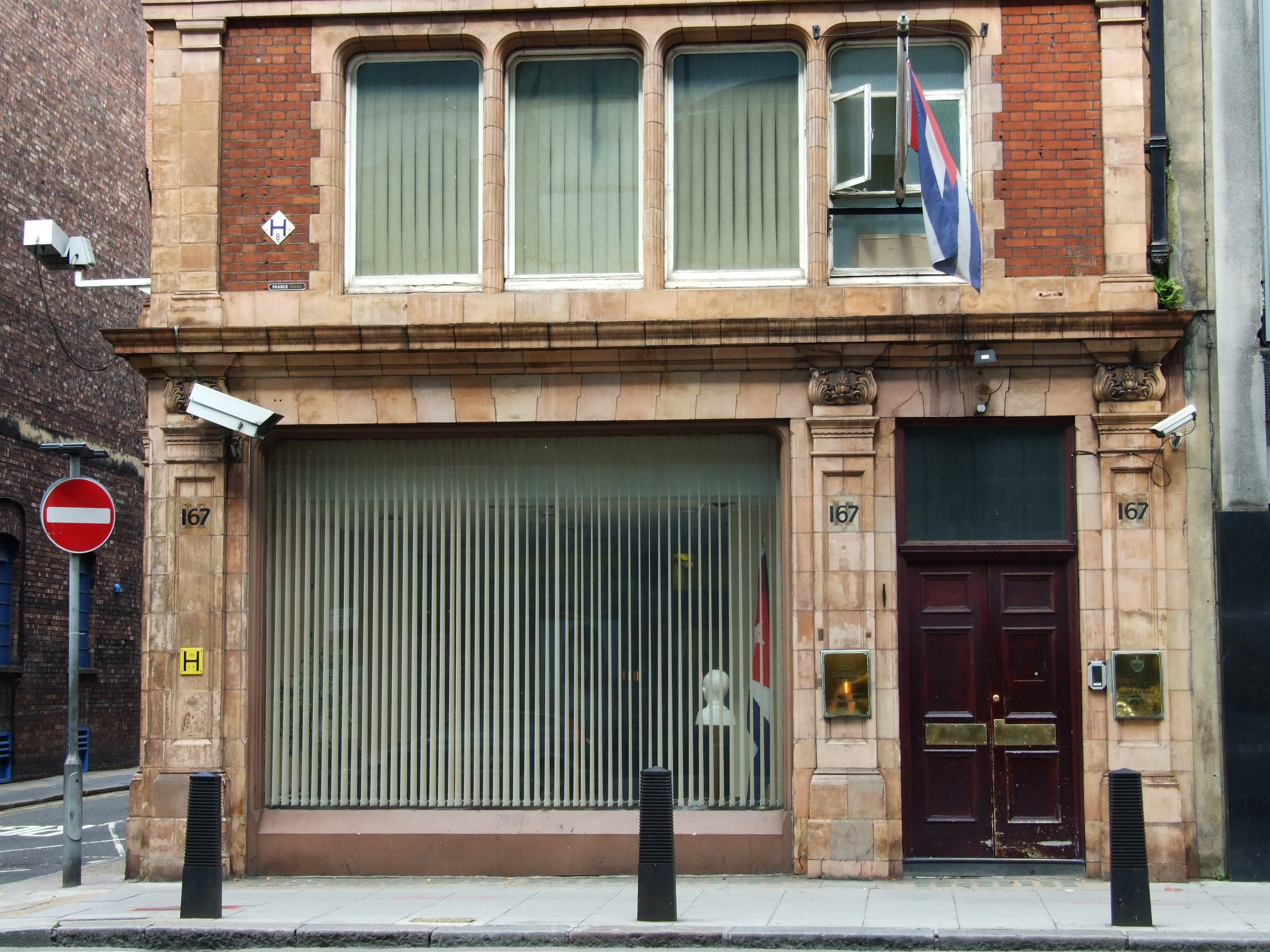
Embassy of Cuba in London

== See also ==
- List of ambassadors of the United Kingdom to Cuba
- Cubans in the United Kingdom
