= Herbert Marchant =

Sir Herbert Stanley Marchant KCMG OBE (18 May 1906 – 8 August 1990) was a schoolmaster, at Bletchley Park the codebreaking centre in World War II, and then a diplomat. He was ambassador to Cuba (1960–63) and Tunisia (1963–66); remembered for replying to British newspapers during the Cuban Missile Crisis that “Everything is perfectly quiet here” (in Cuba).

Marchant was born in Cambridge and attended Perse School, before studying modern languages at St John’s College, Cambridge. He was an assistant master at Harrow School 1928–39, teaching French and German, and later Russian.

He was at Bletchley Park in World War II, where he was the deputy head of Hut 3 from 1943 until the end of the war. The head Eric Jones had taken over sole responsibility from 1942, after personal rivalries between the original staff of Hut 3.

After the war he was in the Foreign Service 1946–66. Then he became Assistant Director of the Institute of Race Relations 1966–68, and United Kingdom representative on the United Nations Committee for the Elimination of Racial Discrimination 1969–73.

He married Diana Selway in 1937, they had one son. He was awarded the OBE 1946, CMG 1957 & KCMG 1963.

== Books by H.S. Marchant ==
- Scratch a Russian (Drummond, London, 1937) Travel in the Soviet Union
- His Excellency Regrets (Kimber, London, 1980) a novel
