= Anne Murray Keith =

Scottish folklorist (1736–1818)

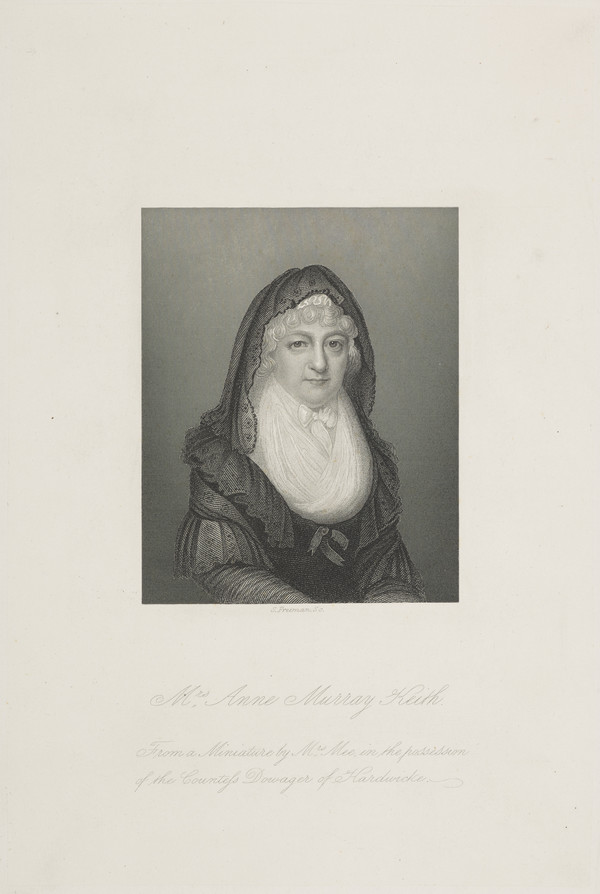
Anne Murray Keith

Anne Murray Keith (1736–1818) was a Scottish folklorist and landowner, a good friend of Walter Scott.

== Personal life ==
She was the daughter of the diplomat Robert Murray Keith and his wife Margaret Cunningham, daughter of Sir William Cunningham, 2nd baronet, of Caprington, Ayrshire (see Dick-Cunyngham baronets of Lambrughton (1669)); she was the sister of Robert Murray Keith (the younger) (1730–1795) and Basil Keith (died 1770).

Charles Kirkpatrick Sharpe wrote that Keith lived for a long period at 51 George Street, Edinburgh, with her elder sister Jenny. She was a close friend of the Countess of Balcarres (née Anne Dalrymple), widow of James Lindsay, 5th Earl of Balcarres. From 1794, they shared an Edinburgh apartment, on George Square. Keith was a cousin of the Countess, who used to refer to her as her "husband". Writing to his two eldest daughters, the Earl had called her "Doctor Anne Keith".

The Earl died in 1768. That year, Keith played a part in Volkier Rudolph Bentinck (1738–1820), a Dutch officer in the British Army, being rejected as a suitor for the eldest daughter Anne, later Lady Anne Barnard. When the young 6th Earl returned from captivity after serving in the American Revolutionary War, Keith intervened to see that he married a cousin in 1780, despite an existing romantic interest.

Elizabeth Yorke, Countess of Hardwicke was a younger daughter of the Countess. After the death of her brother Robert, Keith became the guardian of his illegitimate daughter then known as Amelia Gordon (later Amelia Gillespie Smyth). Philip Yorke, 3rd Earl of Hardwicke, Elizabeth's husband, wrote on 11 November 1795 to Keith, passing on King George III's positive view of the arrangement: he quoted the king's comment "Well! it will be fortunate for the child. She is a very sensible woman."

Later in life, Anne Murray Keith was often given the honorific Mrs., a custom of the time for respect, given for example by the engraver of her portrait after Anne Mee; she never married. She inherited the Keith family estates. By 1804 she and the Countess had moved to Balcarres House, to live out their lives, with Robert Lindsay to whom it by this time belonged.

== Songs and verse ==
A number of songs were attributed to Keith in the Scots Musical Museum: #75 (The Banks of Forth); #129 (Stay my Charmer, can you leave me?); and #136 (Why hangs that cloud) being in the index of the 1839 edition. Her version of "Oscar's Ghost" appeared in The Book of Scottish Song (1843) edited by Alexander Whitelaw.

Verse intended as a song was published in 1868 in Choice Old Scottish Ballads as "The Cheat Detected; or a Hint Detected"; with Walter Scott's story that Keith had versified Ossian (in unpublished manuscripts). Later in the 19th century she was called a "considerable poetess" by Charles Rogers. A 1977 review of the reprinted 1868 Choice Old Scottish Ballads commented:

One of the most interesting strains is that of songs composed by the nobles and lawyers and ladies of Edinburgh, by such people as Lord Binning (d. 1733) and Anne Murray Keith (Scott's 'Mrs Bethune Baliol'), which with their inventive wit and satirical edge provide a glimpsed insight into a Scottish metropolitan culture of liveliness and sophistication.

== Associations ==
Keith knew the novelist Walter Scott from his young days. Scott wrote that she was a "great friend" of Christian Rutherford, who was his mother's half-sister, daughter of John Rutherford by his second marriage.

It is related that Keith recognised his authorship of Waverley, published anonymously by Scott in 1814. On his denying it, she reportedly retorted in Lallans idiom "D'ye think, sir, I dinna ken my ain groats in ither folk's kaill" (meaning she recognised in it her own ideas). This version of the encounter was given by Edward Ramsay, who attributed it to the Free Church of Scotland minister William Blair of Dunblane.

Anne Murray Keith encountered the writer Lady Louisa Stuart in 1785, who listened to her stories, as she had to those of her mother Mary Stuart, Countess of Bute.

== In literature ==
In Walter Scott's Chronicles of the Canongate, the story "The Highland Widow" was based on one Keith told, as he wrote later, and is written in a style close to her own. She is mentioned, under the name Mrs. Bethune Baliol.

== Legacy ==
Anne Murray Keith placed in trust with the 3rd Earl of Hardwicke the papers of her brother Robert, which had passed to his daughter Amelia, her ward. Then in 1810 they were given to the Earl. Forming the 44 volumes CLV to CXCVIII of the Hardwicke Papers, they went to the British Museum.
