= Joseph Wilton =

English sculptor (1722–1803)

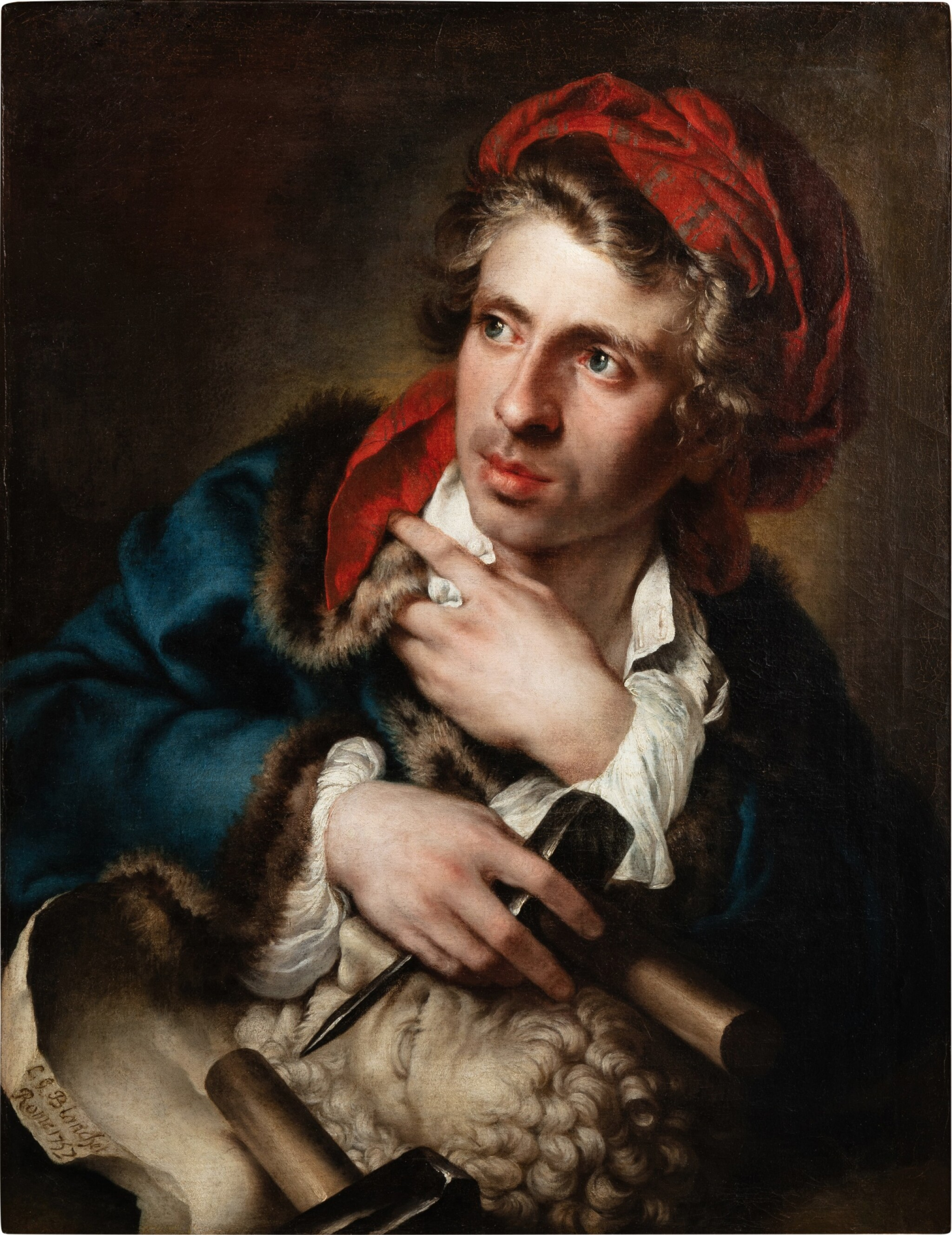
- Wilton holding a bust of Demosthenes, portrait by Louis-Gabriel Blanchet
- Born: 16 July 1722; London
- Died: 25 November 1803; London
- Resting place: St. Mary the Virgin Churchyard, Wanstead
- Occupation: Sculptor

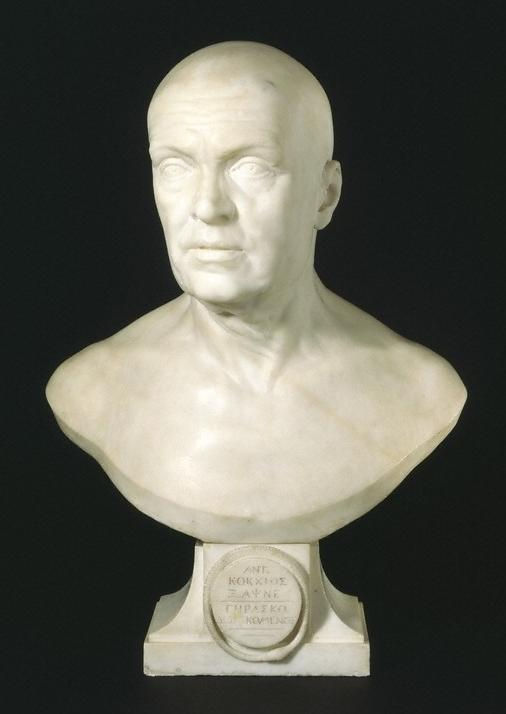
Portrait bust of Dr Antonio Cocchi, 1755, Joseph Wilton V&A Museum no. A.9–1966

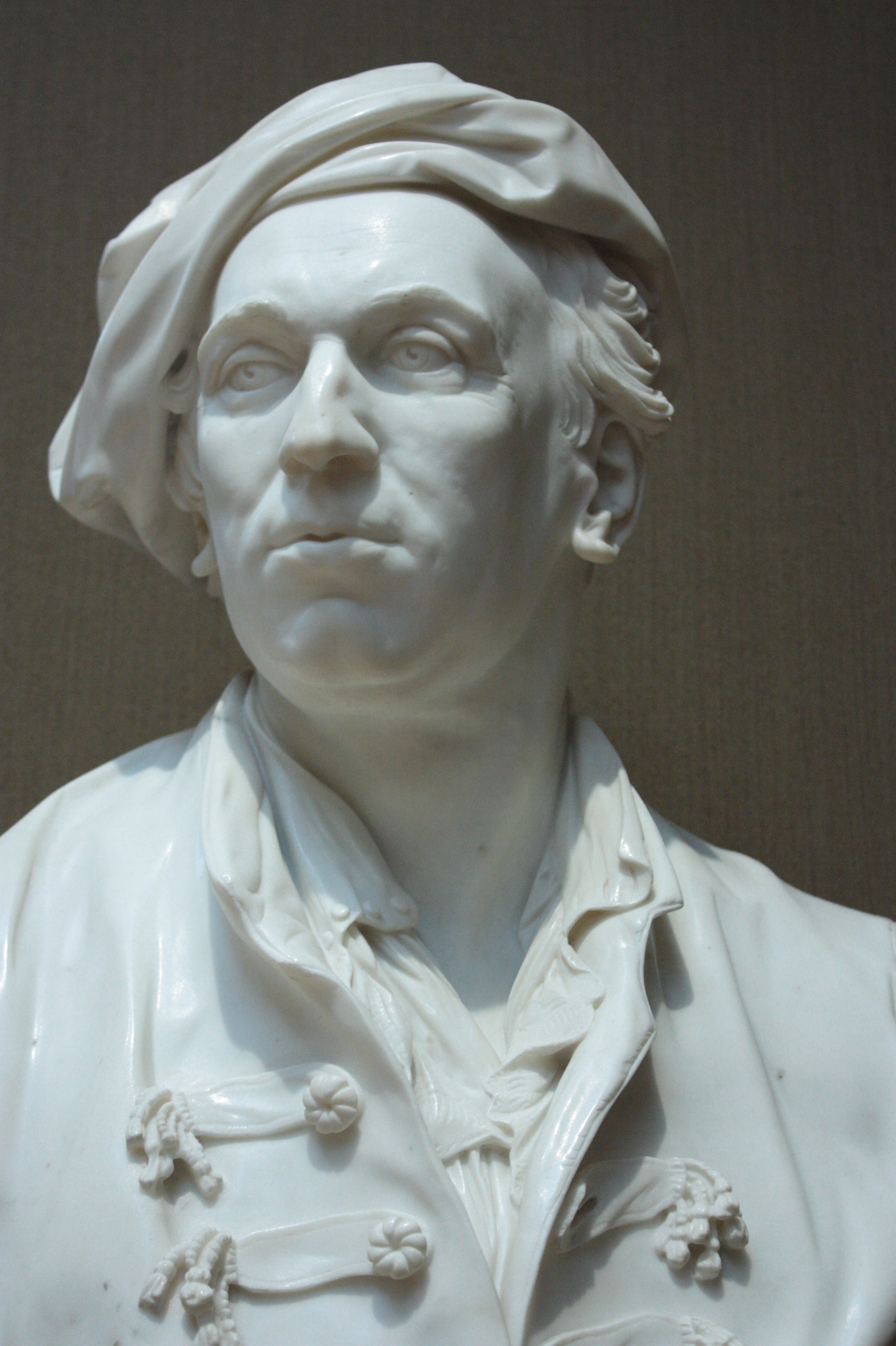
Roubiliac by Joseph Wilton, 1761, National Portrait Gallery, London

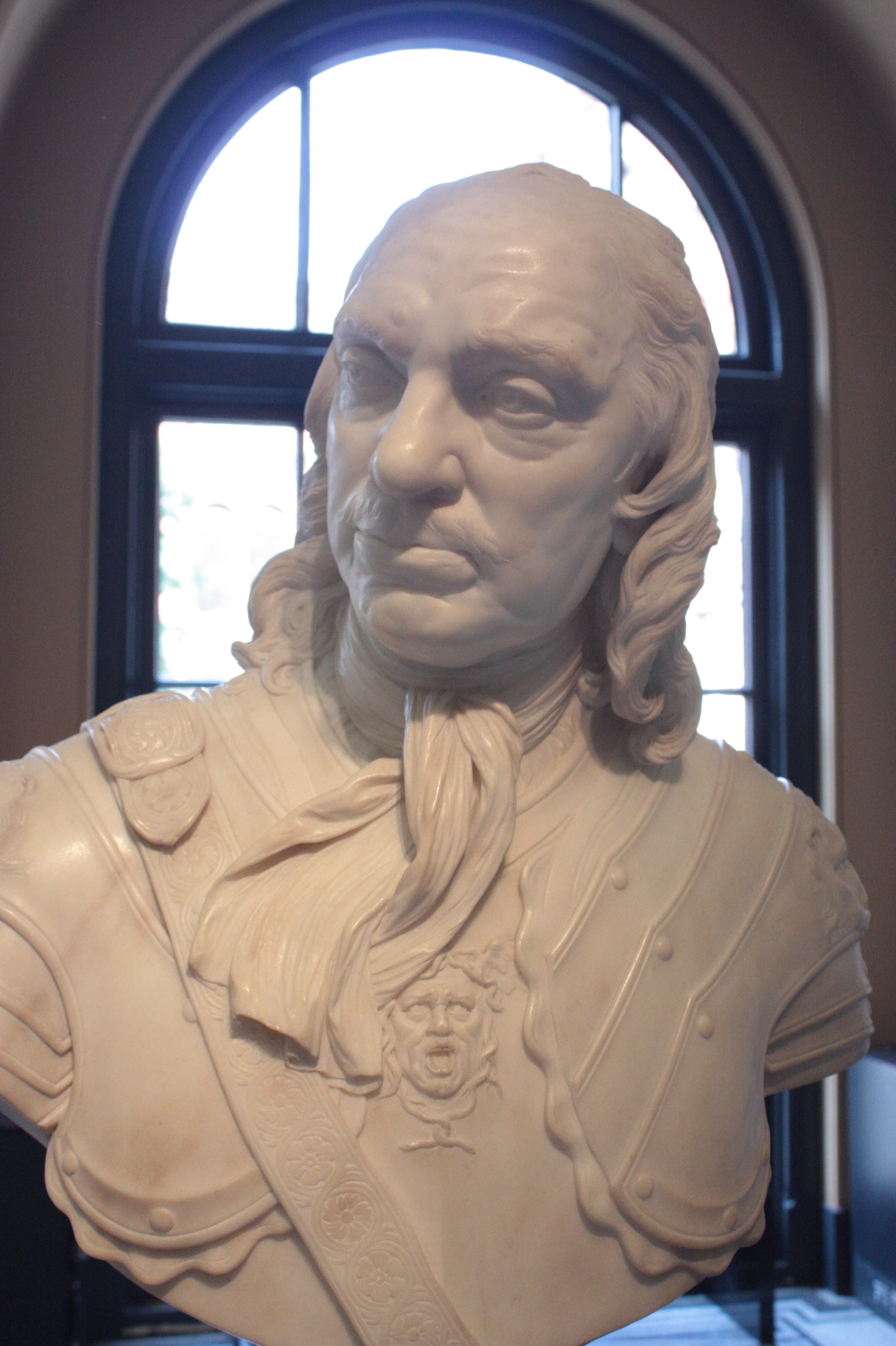
Oliver Cromwell by Joseph Wilton, 1762, Victoria and Albert Museum

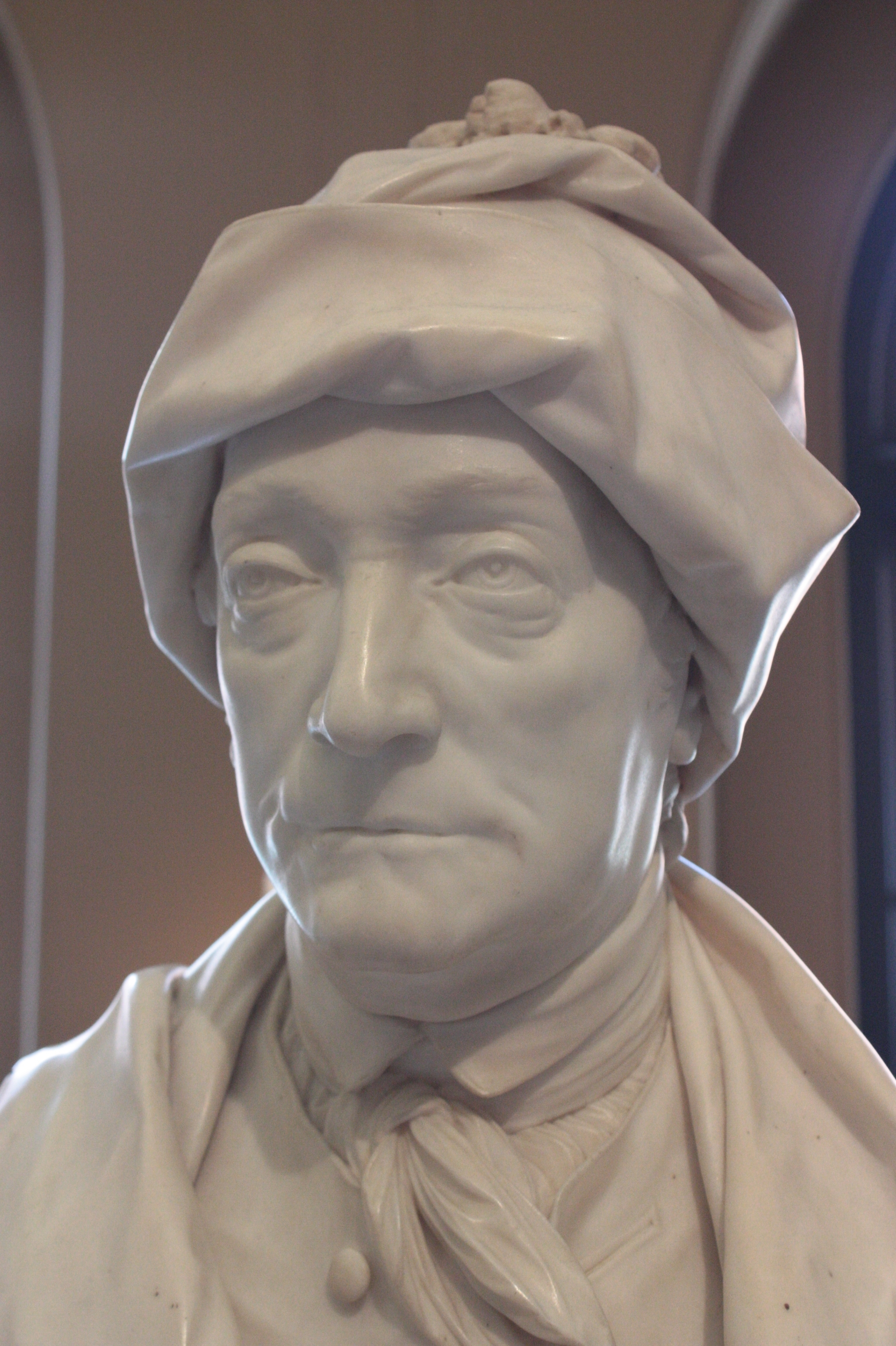
Unknown man (thought to be Dr Edward Archer), 1781, Victoria and Albert Museum

Joseph Wilton RA (16 July 1722 – 25 November 1803) was an English sculptor. He was one of the founding members of the Royal Academy in 1768, and the academy's third keeper. His works are particularly numerous memorialising the famous Britons in Westminster Abbey. In the United States, he is best remembered for sculpting a statue of King George III, which was located in Bowling Green park, New York City, which was pulled down by American patriots on July 9, 1776 and melted into 42,000 musketballs for the Continental Army.

== Life ==
He was born the son of an ornamental plasterer in the Charing Cross area of London, where his father had sculpted the ceilings of the Foundling Hospital. His father wished that Joseph should become a civil engineer but instead Joseph strongly desired to be a sculptor.

Wilton initially trained under Laurent Delvaux at Nivelles, in present-day Belgium. In 1744 he left Nivelles and went to the academy in Paris to study under Jean-Baptiste Pigalle. In 1752 he went to Italy with his sculptor friend Louis-François Roubiliac to learn to sculpt in marble, and stayed for seven years, living first in Rome and then in Florence. Whilst in Rome he met and befriended his first patron, William Locke of Norbury, who thereafter accompanied Wilton on his tour of Italy. Like many other artists of the day, he studied antiquities, and made numerous plaster casts and marble copies of classic works – many of these later formed the collection of Charles Lennox, 3rd Duke of Richmond at Richmond House in west London. A marble bust of the physician and scholar Antonio Cocchi, carved by Wilton in 1755, his last year in Italy, is in the collection of the Victoria and Albert Museum. Influenced by Wilton's study of antique busts, it was considered by Margaret Whinney to be one of Wilton's most distinguished works.

While in Florence he made the acquaintance of the Florentine painter Giovanni Battista Cipriani. When Wilton and the architect William Chambers returned to England, in August 1755, Cipriani went with them.

Once back in London, Wilton was named co-director of Lennox's Richmond House gallery, and established a workshop. He built up a considerable practice, making busts and monuments, including the memorial to James Wolfe in Westminster Abbey. He made at least two marble busts of Oliver Cromwell, which he showed at the Society of Artists, in 1761 and 1761, basing the likeness on a cast of Cromwell's face. One marble version, and the terracotta model for it, is in the collection of the Victoria and Albert Museum.

In 1761, he was first commissioned to produce a statue of King George III. Similar commissions followed, including one in 1766 from New York City. This massive statue portrayed the king on horseback in Roman garb, and was cast in lead and gilded before being shipped to America and erected at Bowling Green, near the tip of Manhattan in August 1770. It did not last long, being torn down by patriots in July 1776.

Wilton's other works include many notable busts, monuments (e.g. Stephen Hales' memorial in Westminster Abbey, London) and other carvings including fireplaces and tables.

In 1768, when Wilton was perhaps at the peak of his powers, he was elected a founder member of the Royal Academy. However, that year also saw him inherit his father's fortune and the new wealth diverted him away from sculpture to a life of dissolution. In 1786 he was forced to sell most of his possessions and in 1793 he was officially declared bankrupt. In 1790 he was appointed Keeper of the Royal Academy, a post he kept until his death in 1803. He was buried at St Mary the Virgin, Wanstead in east London.

== Principal works ==
- Monument to Admiral Samuel Graves in Antony, Cornwall (1755)
- Monument to Pyke Crouch in Buntingford, Hertfordshire (1756)
- Monument to Admiral Temple West in Westminster Abbey (1757)
- Bust of Thomas Sydenham (1758)
- Bust of a Bearded Immortal for Wentworth Woodhouse (1758)
- a Medici lion sculpture at Kedleston Hall (carved around 1760–1770)
- Monument to Stephen Hales in Westminster Abbey (1761)
- Monument to Admiral Holmes in Westminster Abbey (1761)
- Bust of his friend Louis-François Roubiliac (1761)
- Monument to Bishop Hoadly in Winchester Cathedral (1761)
- Gold State Coach (1762)
- Monument to Charlotte St. Quentin in Harpham, Yorkshire (1762)
- Bust of Sir Isaac Newton in the Bodleian Library, Oxford (1762)
- Bust of Oliver Cromwell, Victoria and Albert Museum (1762)
- Monument to Sir Hans Sloane in the churchyard of Chelsea Old Church (1763)
- Monument to Mary Okeover in Okeover, Staffordshire (1764)
- Monument to William Pulteney, 1st Earl of Bath in Westminster Abbey (1764)
- Bust of Lord Camden (1767)
- Monument to the Earl and Countess of Mountrath in Westminster Abbey (1771)
- Bust of Alfred the Great for Lord Radnor (1771) now in University College Oxford
- Monument to General James Wolfe in Westminster Abbey (1772)
- Bust of Lord Chesterfield, 4th Earl of Bristol at Ickworth Park, Suffolk (1772)
- Monument to Sir Thomas Street in Worcester Cathedral (1774)
- Monument (including a life-size figure) of the Earl of Mexborough at Methley, Yorkshire (1778)
- Monument to Sir Basil Keith in Jamaica Cathedral (1780)
- Monument to Sir James Steuart Denham in Westminster Abbey (1780)
- Monument to his own daughters in Chelsea Old Church (1781)
- Bust of Sir Robert Long (d 1767) in Draycot Cerne Church, Wiltshire (1784)
- Monument to Sir Archibald Campbell in Westminster Abbey (1795)

== Trivia ==
By some accounts, the town of Wilton, New Hampshire is said to have been named after Sir Joseph in 1762.
