= Susannah Goshko =

British civil servant

Her Excellency Susannah Goshko CMG
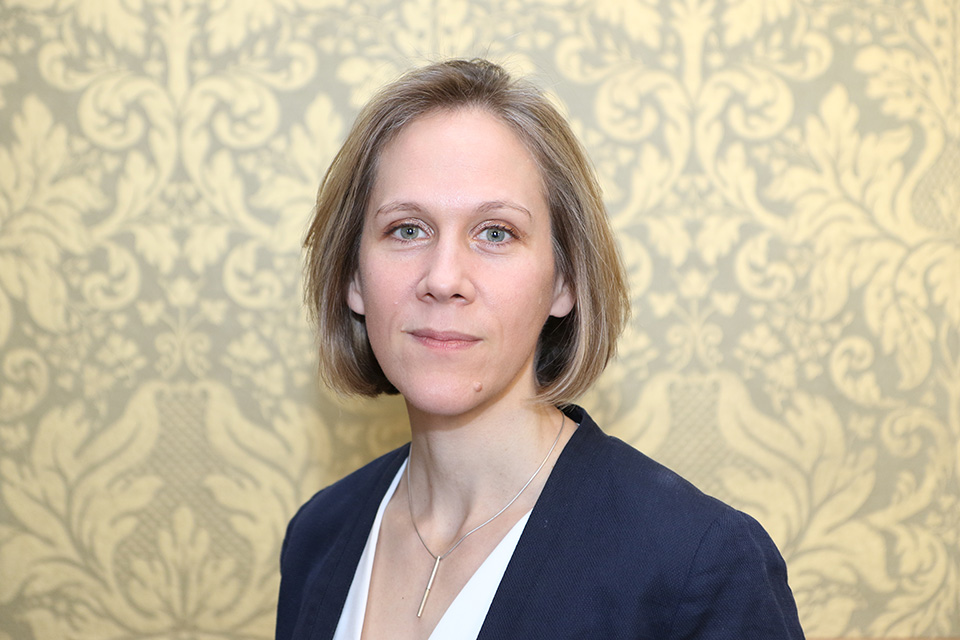

British Ambassador to Mexico
- Incumbent
- Assumed office November 2024
- Monarch: Charles III
- Prime Minister: Keir Starmer; Andy Burnham
- Preceded by: Jon Benjamin

British High Commissioner to Canada
- In office September 2021 – November 2024
- Monarchs: Elizabeth II; Charles III
- Prime Minister: Boris Johnson; Liz Truss; Rishi Sunak; Keir Starmer
- Preceded by: Susan le Jeune d'Allegeershecque
- Succeeded by: David Prodger (Chargé d’Affaires, interim), then Rob Tinline

Personal details
- Spouse: Matt Goshko

Susannah Clare Goshko CMG is a British civil servant in His Majesty's Diplomatic Service. As of August 2025, she is the British Ambassador to Mexico.

== Career ==
Goshko was deputy director at the Department for Exiting the European Union. She was the Principal Private Secretary to the Secretary of State for Foreign and Commonwealth Affairs from April 2019 to 2021.

Goshko was appointed Companion of the Order of St Michael and St George (CMG) in the 2021 Birthday Honours for services to British foreign policy.

Goshko served as the British High Commissioner to Canada, replacing Susan le Jeune d'Allegeershecque on 7 September 2021. In October 2021, she gave her first interview in Canada on Power & Politics on CBC News. On 23 September 2024, the FCDO announced she would soon be leaving the job for another diplomatic posting.

In November 2024, Goshko became Ambassador to Mexico.

== Personal life ==
Goshko's husband, Matt, has served as director of press at the Embassy of the United States, London.

Government offices
Preceded by Serena Stone	Principal Private Secretary to the Foreign Secretary; 2019–2021	Succeeded by Nick Catsaras
Diplomatic posts
Preceded by Susan le Jeune d'Allegeershecque	British High Commissioner to Canada; 2021–2024	Succeeded by Rob Tinline
Preceded by Jon Benjamin	British Ambassador to Mexico; 2024–	Incumbent
