= Mark Kent =

British diplomat

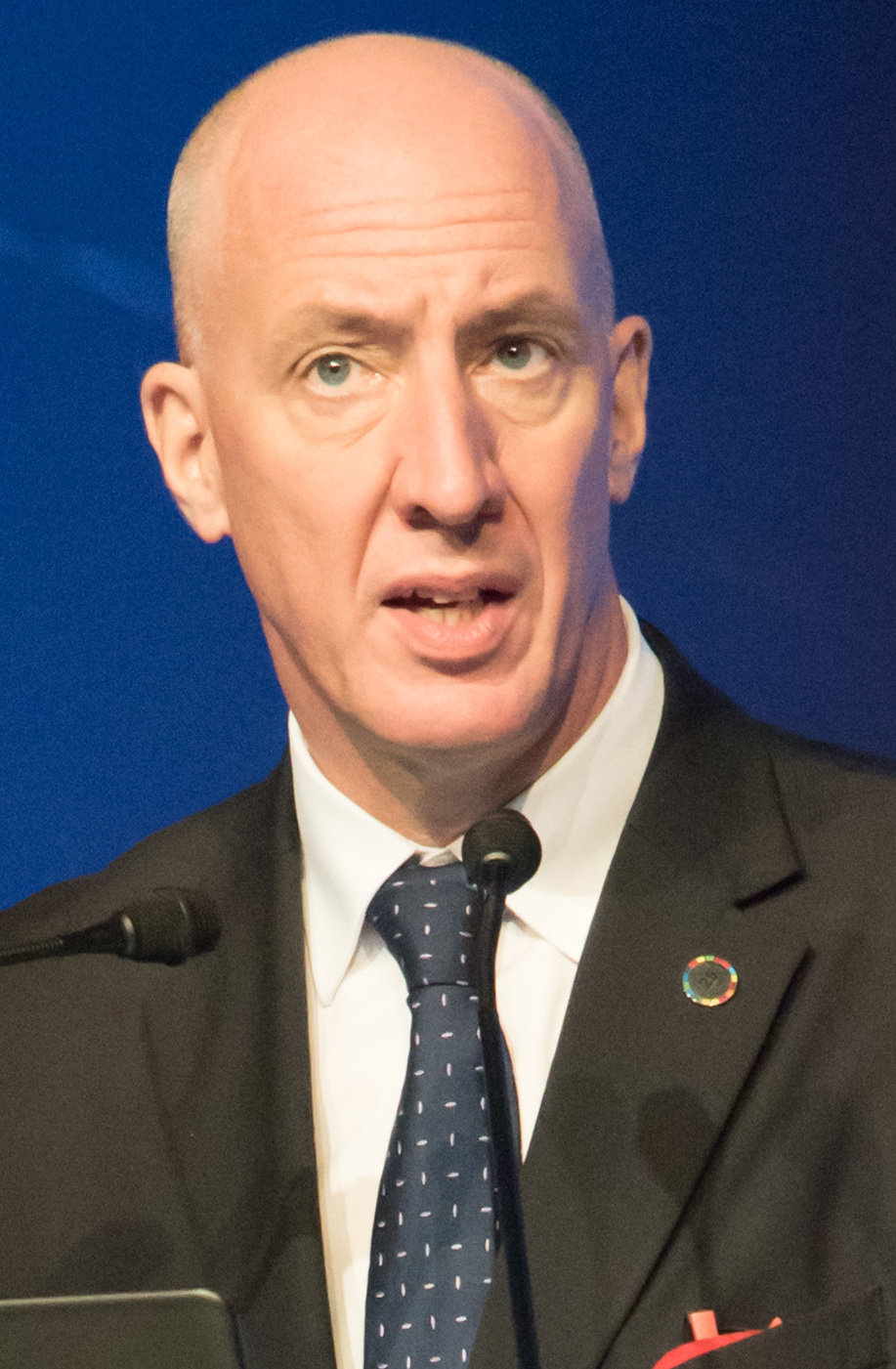
Mark Kent in 2017

Mark Andrew Geoffrey Kent CMG (born Spilsby 14 January 1966) is a British businessman and former diplomat who served as UK ambassador to Argentina from 2016 to 2021.

Kent was educated at Queen Elizabeth's Grammar School, Horncastle before he read law at Lincoln College, Oxford, graduating in 1986. He joined Her Majesty's Diplomatic Service in 1987. He served in Brasília, Brussels, Mexico City and Casteau before being appointed Ambassador to Vietnam in 2007. From 2012 to 2016 he was Ambassador to Thailand.

Kent was appointed Companion of the Order of St Michael and St George (CMG) in the 2020 Birthday Honours for services to British foreign policy.

In 2021, Kent was appointed the ninth Chief Executive of the Scotch Whisky Association. He has been Executive Chair of the Vietnam-UK Network since April 2023.

Diplomatic posts
Preceded by Robert Anthony Eagleson Gordon	British Ambassador to Vietnam; 2007–2010	Succeeded by Antony Stokes
Preceded by Asif Ahmad	British Ambassador to Thailand; 2012–2016	Succeeded by Brian Davidson
Preceded by John Patrick George Freeman	British Ambassador to Argentina; 2016–2021	Succeeded by Kirsty Hayes
