= List of ambassadors of Great Britain to the Holy Roman Emperor =

Ambassador of Great Britain to the Holy Roman Emperor
- Arms of Great Britain
- Style: His Excellency
- Residence: Vienna
- Appointer: The monarch
- Inaugural holder: Sir Philip Meadows; Envoy Extraordinary
- Final holder: Gilbert, Earl of Minto; Last Ambassador of Great Britain to the Holy Roman Emperor

The ambassador of Great Britain to the Holy Roman Emperor was the foremost diplomatic representative of the Kingdom of Great Britain, a state created in 1707 by the Union of England and Scotland, to the Holy Roman Emperor. The Embassy was a prestigious posting in the British foreign service.

For the ambassadors from the Court of St. James's up to 1707, see List of ambassadors of the Kingdom of England to the Holy Roman Emperor and for the period since 1800, see List of Ambassadors from the United Kingdom to Austria.

== List of heads of mission ==
=== Envoys-Extraordinary and Ambassadors to the Holy Roman Emperor ===
- 1707–1709: Sir Philip Meadowes Envoy Extraordinary
- 1707–1708 and 1709–1711: Maj.-Gen. Francis Palmes Envoy Extraordinary
  - 1710–1711: Charles Mordaunt, 3rd Earl of Peterborough Special Mission
- 1711–1714: Simon Clement Chargé d'Affaires
- 1711: Charles Whitworth Ambassador
  - 1712–1713: Abraham Stanyan (not in Vienna)
  - 1714: James Stahope sent with Baron Cobham
- 1714–1715: Richard Temple, 1st Baron Cobham
  - 1715: George Carpenter, 1st Baron Carpenter (appointed but did not go)
- 1715–1716: Luke Schaub in charge
- 1716–1718: Abraham Stanyan
- Robert Sutton, 2nd Baron Lexinton (1718)
- 1718: Luke Schaub and François-Louis de Pesmes de Saint-Saphorin Chargés d'Affaires
- 1718–1727: François-Louis de Pesmes de Saint-Saphorin Chargé d'Affaires
- 1719–1720: The Earl Cadogan Ambassador Extraordinary and Plenipotentiary
  - 1721: Colonel Charles Churchill Special Mission
  - 1721–1724: Francis Colman Secretary
  - 1724–1725: Charles Harrison Minister or Resident
  - 1726–1727: George Woodward Secretary
- 1727–1730: James Waldegrave, 1st Earl Waldegrave Ambassador
- 1730–1748: Thomas Robinson Minister Plenipotentiary (but sometimes called Envoy Extraordinary)
  - 1742–1747: James Porter Commissary
  - 1742–1743: Thomas Villiers Special Mission
- 1748–1757: Robert Keith (d. 1774) Minister 1748–1753; then Minister Plenipotentiary
  - 1752: John Carmichael, 3rd Earl of Hyndford Special Mission
- 1757–1763: No diplomatic relations due to Seven Years' War

=== Envoys-Extraordinary and Ministers-Plenipotentiary to the Holy Roman Emperor ===
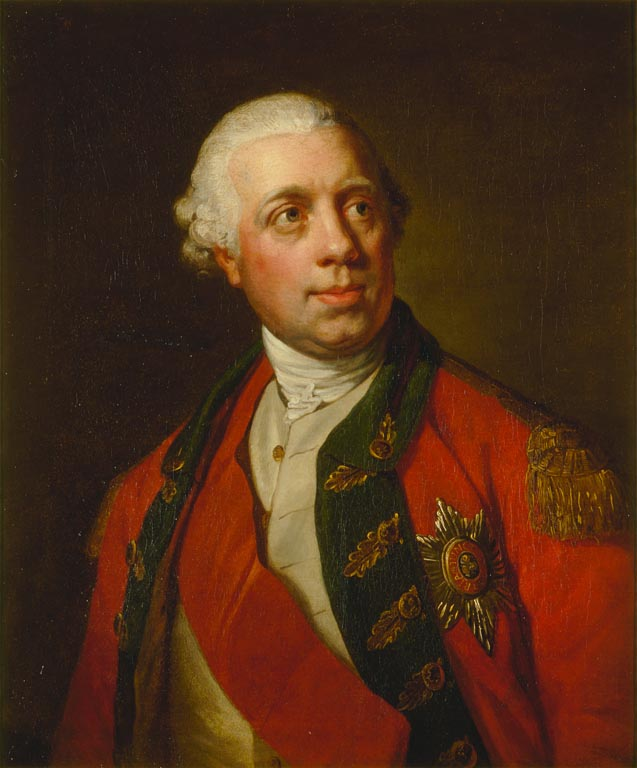
Robert Murray Keith

- 1763–1772: David Murray, Viscount Stormont Ambassador
- 1772–1792: Robert Murray Keith (the younger)
  - 1790: The Earl of Elgin Envoy-Extraordinary
- 1792–1793 The Earl of Elgin
- 1793–1794 Sir Morton Eden
- 1794: George Spencer, 2nd Earl Spencer Ambassador-Extraordinary
- 1794–1798: Sir Morton Eden (again)
- 1799–1801: Gilbert, Earl of Minto
