= List of high commissioners of the United Kingdom to Canada =

The high commissioner of the United Kingdom to Canada is the United Kingdom's foremost diplomatic representative in Canada and is in charge of the British diplomatic mission to Canada.

As fellow members of the Commonwealth of Nations, diplomatic relations between the United Kingdom and Canada are at governmental level, rather than between heads of state, sharing the same monarch. Thus, the countries exchange high commissioners, rather than ambassadors.

The offices of the British High Commission are on Sussex Drive in Ottawa, opposite Global Affairs Canada.

The British high commissioner's residence is Earnscliffe in Ottawa on Sussex Drive. The house was built in 1855, was later occupied by Canada's first prime minister, John A. Macdonald, and was bought in 1930 by the first British high commissioner to Canada, Sir William Clark.

The incumbent chargé d’affaires is David Prodger, who assumed the office in November 2024. Robert Tinline will become high commissioner from February 2025.

== List of heads of mission ==
=== High commissioners to Canada ===
- 1928–1934: Sir William Clark
- 1934–1938: Sir Francis Floud
- 1938–1941: Sir Gerald Campbell
- 1941–1946: Malcolm MacDonald
- 1946–1952: Sir Alexander Clutterbuck
- 1952–1956: Sir Archibald Nye
- 1956–1961: Sir Saville Garner
- 1961–1963: The Viscount Amory
- 1963–1968: Sir Henry Lintott
- 1968–1970: Sir Colin Crowe
- 1970–1974: Sir Peter Hayman
- 1974–1978: Sir John Johnston
- 1978–1981: Sir John Ford
- 1981–1984: The Lord Moran
- 1984–1987: Sir Derek Day
- 1987–1989: Sir Alan Urwick
- 1989–1992: Sir Brian Fall
- 1992–1996: Sir Nicholas Bayne
- 1996–2000: Sir Anthony Goodenough
- 2000–2003: Sir Andrew Burns
- 2003–2006: David Reddaway
- 2006–2011: Anthony Cary
- 2011–2012: Andrew Pocock
- 2012–2013: Corin Robertson (acting)
- 2013–2017: Howard Drake
- 2017–2021: Susan le Jeune d'Allegeershecque
- 2021–2024:Susannah Goshko
- 2024–2025: David Prodger (Chargé d’Affaires)
- 2025–present: Robert Tinline

== See also ==
- British High Commission, Ottawa
- Canada–United Kingdom relations
