= List of ambassadors of the Kingdom of England to the Holy Roman Emperor =

Ambassador of the Kingdom of England to the Holy Roman Emperor
- Arms of England
- Style: His Excellency
- Appointer: The monarch

The Ambassador of the Kingdom of England to the Holy Roman Emperor was the principal diplomatic representative of the historic Kingdom of England to the Holy Roman Emperors, before the creation of the Kingdom of Great Britain in 1707.

The position was not a continuous one.

== English Ambassadors and Ministers to the Emperor ==
=== Ambassadors to the Holy Roman Emperor ===
- 1603–1604: Stephen Lesieur Special Ambassador
- 1605–?: Sir Andrew Keith Special Ambassador
- 1610–1611: Sir Stephen Lesieur Special Ambassador
- 1612–1613: William Cecil, 17th Baron de Ros Special Ambassador
- 1612–1614: Sir Stephen Lesieur Special Ambassador
- 1619–1620: James Hay, 1st Viscount Doncaster
- 1620–1621: Sir Henry Wotton
- 1621: John Digby, Baron Digby
- 1621–1622: Simon Digby

No representation

- 1635–1639: John Taylor Agent
- 1636: Thomas Howard, 21st Earl of Arundel
- 1641–1642: Sir Thomas Roe, supported by Sir William Curtius.

No representation

- 1664–1677: Sir William Curtius Resident Ambassador

=== Envoys to the Holy Roman Emperor ===
- 1665–1667: Theobald Taaffe, 1st Earl of Carlingford
- 1672–1673: Sir Bernard Gascoigne
- 1673: Henry Mordaunt, 2nd Earl of Peterborough Ambassador Extraordinary
- 1675–1681: Bevil Skelton
- 1680–1681: Charles Middleton, 2nd Earl of Middleton
- 1688–1689: Nicholas Taafe, 2nd Earl of Carlingford
- 1689–1692: William Paget, 6th Baron Paget Envoy Extraordinary
  - 1693: George Stepney Secretary or agent
- 1694–1697: Robert Sutton, 2nd Baron Lexinton Envoy Extraordinary
- 1697–1700: Robert Sutton Secretary then Resident
- 1701–1705: George Stepney Envoy Extraordinary
  - 1703–1704: Charles Whitworth Chargé d'Affaires
- 1705: Charles Spencer, 3rd Earl of Sunderland
- 1706: Thomas Wentworth, Baron Raby
  - 1707: Charles Montagu, Earl of Manchester Special Mission

== After the Union of England and Scotland ==
In 1707 the Kingdom of England became part of the new Kingdom of Great Britain. For missions from the court of St James's after 1707, see List of ambassadors of Great Britain to the Holy Roman Emperor and then List of ambassadors of Great Britain to Austria.

== See also ==
- List of Holy Roman Empire ambassadors to England
