= Howard Drake =

British former diplomat

Howard Drake CMG OBE
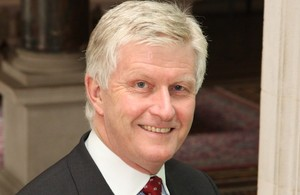

British High Commissioner to Canada
- In office 2013–2017
- Monarch: Elizabeth II
- Prime Minister: David Cameron; Theresa May
- Preceded by: Corin Robertson (acting)
- Succeeded by: Susan le Jeune d'Allegeershecque

British High Commissioner to Jamaica
- In office 2010–2013
- Monarch: Elizabeth II
- Prime Minister: Gordon Brown; David Cameron
- Preceded by: Jeremy Cresswell
- Succeeded by: David Fitton

British Ambassador to Chile
- In office 2005–2009
- Monarch: Elizabeth II
- Prime Minister: Tony Blair; Gordon Brown
- Preceded by: Richard Wilkinson
- Succeeded by: Jon Benjamin

Personal details
- Born: 13 August 1956 (age 69)

Howard Ronald Drake (born 13 August 1956) is a British former diplomat who was High Commissioner to Canada from 2013 to 2017. He retired from the Diplomatic Service in August 2017.

== Education ==
Drake was educated at Churcher's College.

== Career ==
- 1981–1983: Vice-Consul Commercial, Los Angeles, United States
- 1985–1988: Second Secretary Political, Santiago, Chile
- early 1990s: Head of Chancery, Singapore
- 1997–2002: Deputy Consul-General and Director of Inward Investment, New York City, United States
- 2005–2009: Ambassador to Chile
- 2010–2013: British High Commissioner to Jamaica
- 2013–2017: British High Commissioner to Canada

On 14 March 2014, in the midst of the annexation of Crimea by the Russian Federation, he wrote an op-ed in The Globe and Mail on why his Government thought the Crimean referendum should be cancelled.

Drake was appointed Companion of the Order of St Michael and St George (CMG) in the 2017 Birthday Honours.

Diplomatic posts
Preceded by Richard Wilkinson	British Ambassador to Chile; 2005–2009	Succeeded by Jon Benjamin
Preceded by Jeremy Cresswell	British High Commissioner to Jamaica; 2010–2013	Succeeded by David Fitton
Preceded by Corin Robertson; Acting	British High Commissioner to Canada; 2013–2017	Succeeded by Susan le Jeune d'Allegeershecque
