= Amelia Gillespie Smyth =

Scottish writer

Amelia Gillespie Smyth (1788–1876) was a Scottish writer who published numerous works in the mid-nineteenth century, including a series of books on Christian scriptures for children and a biography of sixteenth-century Italian classical scholar Olympia Morata.

== Literary career ==
Smyth's novel Selwyn in Search of a Daughter was initially published in serial form in Blackwood's Edinburgh Magazine from January to June 1827. The story "Marriage Impromptu" by Smyth was published in Fraser's Magazine in 1832. Both works were included in the three-volume collection Selwyn in Search of a Daughter and Other Tales, which was published by Saunders and Otley in 1835.

Another book by Smyth, titled Fit to be a Duchess: With other stories of Courage and Principle, was published by Ward and Lock in 1860. It was illustrated by E. H. Corbould and J. Absolon.

Mornings with Mama, is a series of dialogues about Christian scripture between a mother and daughter. Of these dialogues, Marion Ann Taylor and Heather Weir write, "Smyth adopted the genre of catechetical writing, casting her interpretive work as a series of conversations between Mama and her child, Mary. Smyth's lessons were not confined to a study of Jesus' life and ministry. Other related lessons on ancient customs and the nature of Scripture, including a discussion of the nature of prophecy and gospel harmonies, were included as sidebars."

=== Bibliography ===
- Selwyn in Search of a Daughter (1827)
- Tales of the Moors; or, Rainy Days in Ross-Shire (1828)
- Probation and Other Tales (1832)
- OLYMPIA MORATA: Her Times, Life and Writings, arranged from contemporary and other authorities (1834)
- Fit to be a Duchess: With other stories of Courage and Principle (1860)
- Mornings with Mama, or Dialogues on Scripture for Young Persons

== Private life ==
Smyth was born in Vienna, Austria, on 8 July 1788. She was an illegitimate child, first known as Amelia Gordon. Her father was Sir Robert Murray Keith (died 1795), was a diplomat in the city; her mother was Marianne Mullin, who later married a surgeon in Moelke.

Under the terms of Keith's will, Amelia Gordon was in the care of British trustees Robert Arbuthnot and Catherine Gandy. She became a ward of Anne Murray Keith, Keith's sister, in Edinburgh.

Amelia was a member of the Scottish Episcopal Church and married Robert Gillespie, who later adopted the surname Smyth. Smyth moved to England following her husband's death in 1855. She died in 1876.
