= Sebastian Wood =

British diplomat

Sir Sebastian Wood KCMG
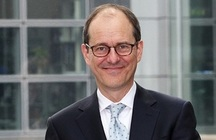

British Ambassador to Germany
- In office 21 September 2015 – 10 November 2020
- Monarch: Elizabeth II
- President: Joachim Gauck; Frank-Walter Steinmeier
- Prime Minister: David Cameron; Theresa May; Boris Johnson
- Chancellor: Angela Merkel
- Preceded by: Sir Simon McDonald
- Succeeded by: Jill Gallard

British Ambassador to China
- In office 2010–2015
- Monarch: Elizabeth II
- President: Hu Jintao; Xi Jinping
- Prime Minister: Gordon Brown; David Cameron
- Premier: Wen Jiabao; Li Keqiang
- Preceded by: Sir William Ehrman
- Succeeded by: Dame Barbara Woodward

Personal details
- Born: 6 April 1961 (age 65) London, England
- Spouse: Sirinat Wood
- Children: 4
- Education: Emanuel School
- Alma mater: Magdalen College, Oxford
- Occupation: Diplomat

Sir James Sebastian Lamin Wood, KCMG (Chinese: 吳思田; pinyin: Wú Sītián; born 6 April 1961), usually known by his middle name Sebastian, is a British diplomat who was the Ambassador to China from 2010 to 2015, and Ambassador to Germany from 2015 to 2020.

== Career ==
Wood was educated at Emanuel School in London, then studied mathematics and philosophy at Magdalen College, Oxford, before joining the Foreign and Commonwealth Office (FCO) in 1983. He was posted to the British Embassy in Bangkok, Thailand; then was appointed as a First Secretary to the Sino-British Joint Liaison Group working on the transfer of sovereignty over Hong Kong.

In 2002, while posted as a Counsellor at the British Embassy in Washington DC, he was appointed Companion of the Order of St Michael and St George (CMG).

=== Ambassador to China ===
In 2010, he was granted his first ambassadorship as British Ambassador to China. He was appointed Knight Commander of the Order of St Michael and St George (KCMG) in the 2014 Birthday Honours for services to British prosperity and British interests in China.

=== Ambassador to Germany ===
In July 2015 the FCO announced that Wood was to become British Ambassador to Germany in September 2015.

In July 2020 it was announced that he would retire from the Diplomatic Service in November, and be succeeded by Jill Gallard as Ambassador to Germany.

== Personal life ==
Wood is married to Sirinat Wood, a Thai, and has one son and three daughters.

Diplomatic posts
Preceded by Sir William Ehrman	British Ambassador to China; 2010–2015	Succeeded by Dame Barbara Woodward
Preceded by Sir Simon McDonald	British Ambassador to Germany; 2015–2020	Succeeded by Jill Gallard
