= Simon Smith (diplomat) =

British diplomat

His Excellency Simon Smith CMG
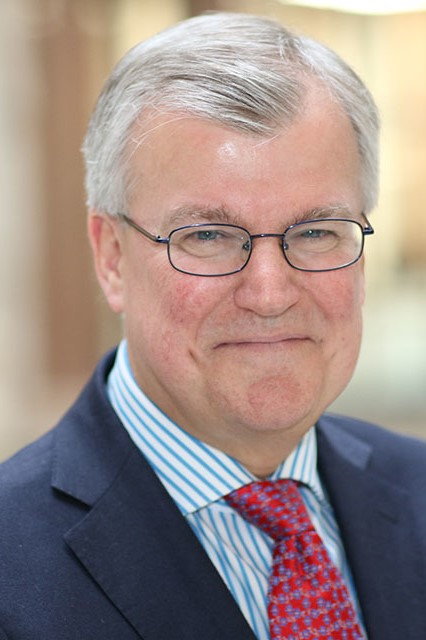

British Ambassador to South Korea
- In office March 2018 – 2022
- Monarch: Elizabeth II
- Prime Minister: Theresa May; Boris Johnson
- Preceded by: Charles Hay
- Succeeded by: Colin Crooks

British Ambassador to Ukraine
- In office 2012–2015
- Monarch: Elizabeth II
- Prime Minister: David Cameron
- Preceded by: Leigh Turner
- Succeeded by: Judith Gough

British Ambassador to Austria
- In office 2007–2012
- Monarch: Elizabeth II
- Prime Minister: Gordon Brown; David Cameron
- Preceded by: John Macgregor
- Succeeded by: Susan le Jeune d'Allegeershecque

Personal details
- Born: Simon John Meredith Smith; 14 January 1958 (age 68) Wegberg, Germany
- Spouse: Sian Stickings
- Children: 2
- Education: Clifton College
- Alma mater: Wadham College, Oxford

Simon John Meredith Smith CMG (born 14 January 1958) is a British diplomat, most recently the ambassador (now retired) to the Republic of Korea (South Korea).

== Early life ==
Smith attended the Triple C School in Grand Cayman, then Clifton College. From Wadham College, Oxford, he gained a BA in Modern Languages in 1980.

== Career ==
From 1981 to 1986, Smith worked at the Department of Employment. He joined Her Majesty's Diplomatic Service in 1986 and has held positions in London, Tokyo, and as Counsellor (Economic/Commercial) in Moscow 1998–2002.

=== Ambassador ===
From 2007 to 2012, Smith served as Ambassador to Austria, based in Vienna, and as the UK's representative to many UN and international organisations in Vienna, including as the UK's Governor on the Board of the International Atomic Energy Agency. His transfer to Kyiv as Ambassador to Ukraine was announced on 13 October 2011, and he took up the appointment in 2012. He was replaced in 2015. After a brief spell in London and Korean language training, he was appointed Ambassador to South Korea and took up the post in March 2018.

== Personal life ==
Smith married Sian Stickings in 1984. She was appointed MBE "for services to the local and British communities in Russia" in the 2003 New Year Honours, following Smith's service in Moscow. They have two daughters. He is currently the Chairman of the British Korean Society a friendship organisation promoting relationships between the UK and the Republic of Korea.

Diplomatic posts
| Preceded by John Macgregor | British Ambassador to Austria; 2007–2012 | Succeeded by Susan le Jeune d'Allegeershecque |
| Preceded by Leigh Turner | British Ambassador to Ukraine; 2012–2015 | Succeeded by Judith Gough |
| Preceded by Charles Hay | British Ambassador to South Korea; 2018–2022 | Succeeded by Colin Crooks |
