= Christopher Hum =

British diplomat (born 1946)

Sir Christopher Hum KCMG

British Ambassador to Poland
- In office 1996–1998
- Monarch: Elizabeth II
- Preceded by: Sir Michael Llewellyn-Smith
- Succeeded by: John Malcolm Macgregor

British Ambassador to China
- In office 2002–2006
- Monarch: Elizabeth II
- President: Jiang Zemin; Hu Jintao
- Prime Minister: Tony Blair
- Premier: Zhu Rongji; Wen Jiabao
- Preceded by: Sir Anthony Galsworthy
- Succeeded by: Sir William Ehrman

Master of Gonville and Caius College, Cambridge
- In office 2006–2012
- Preceded by: Neil McKendrick
- Succeeded by: Sir Alan Fersht

Personal details
- Born: 27 January 1946 (age 80)
- Children: 2
- Education: Berkhamsted School
- Alma mater: Pembroke College, Cambridge

Sir Christopher Owen Hum KCMG (born 27 January 1946) is the former UK Ambassador to the People's Republic of China and Master of a constituent college of the University of Cambridge.

== Education ==
Hum was educated at Berkhamsted School, a boarding independent school for boys in Berkhamsted in Hertfordshire, followed by Pembroke College, Cambridge, where he read modern languages, and is now an Honorary Fellow.

== Life and career ==
Hum was Her Majesty's Ambassador to the People's Republic of China from the years 2002–2006. On 16 January 2006, he became the 41st Master of Gonville and Caius College, one of the oldest colleges of the University of Cambridge, until October 2012.

== Personal life ==
Hum is married with two children.

Diplomatic posts
| Preceded by Sir Michael Llewellyn-Smith | British Ambassador to Poland; 1996–1998 | Succeeded by John Malcolm Macgregor |
| Preceded by Sir Anthony Galsworthy | British Ambassador to China; 2002–2006 | Succeeded by Sir William Ehrman |
Academic offices
| Preceded by Neil McKendrick | Master of Gonville and Caius College, University of Cambridge; 2006–2012 | Succeeded by Sir Alan Fersht |
