= Leigh Turner =

British diplomat (born 1958)

His Excellency Leigh Turner CMG
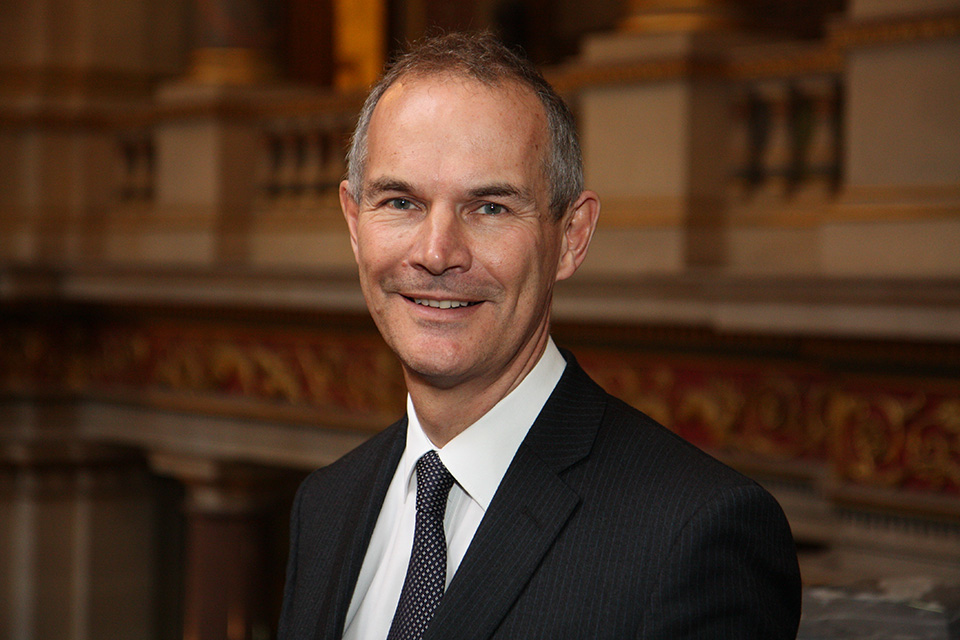

British Ambassador to Austria
- In office 2016–2021
- Monarch: Elizabeth II
- Prime Minister: Theresa May; Boris Johnson
- Preceded by: Susan le Jeune d'Allegeershecque
- Succeeded by: Lindsay Skoll

British Ambassador to Ukraine
- In office 2008–2012
- Monarch: Elizabeth II
- Prime Minister: Gordon Brown; David Cameron
- Preceded by: Tim Barrow
- Succeeded by: Simon Smith

Commissioner for the British Indian Ocean Territory and the British Antarctic Territory
- In office 2006–2008
- Monarch: Elizabeth II
- Prime Minister: Tony Blair; Gordon Brown
- Preceded by: Tony Crombie
- Succeeded by: Colin Roberts

Personal details
- Born: 13 March 1958 (age 68)
- Education: Cambridge University
- Occupation: Writer

Robert Leigh Turner CMG (born 13 March 1958) is a British writer and retired diplomat. His final role was British Ambassador to Austria and UK Permanent Representative to the United Nations in Vienna from August 2016 to September 2021.

== Career ==
From September 2012 to July 2016 Turner was British Consul-General in Istanbul, a post which included responsibility for UK Trade and Investment work in Turkey, South Caucasus, Central Asia and Ukraine. From June 2008 to July 2012 he was British ambassador to Ukraine, resident in Kyiv. From 2006 to 2008 he was Director, Overseas Territories in the Foreign and Commonwealth Office; Commissioner for the British Antarctic Territory; and Commissioner for the British Indian Ocean Territory.

Born in March 1958, he graduated from Downing College, Cambridge in 1979, joining the Civil Service as an administrative trainee the same year. After working in the Departments of Transport and Environment, and the Treasury, he joined the Foreign and Commonwealth Office in 1983 and had postings in Austria, Russia, Germany, Ukraine and Turkey before returning to Vienna.

Whilst on unpaid leave, between 2002 and 2006, he wrote travel articles for the Financial Times, The Boston Globe and other newspapers.

Turner was appointed Companion of the Order of St Michael and St George (CMG) in the 2014 New Year Honours for services to British interests in Ukraine and Turkey.

Turner was succeeded as Ambassador to Austria and Permanent Representative to the United Nations in Vienna by Lindsay Skoll in September 2021. He then retired from the Diplomatic Service.

As Ambassador, Turner wrote and published fiction under the name Robert Pimm. Since his retirement he continues to write a blog and has published several novels and two collections of short stories under his own name. His diplomatic handbook "The Hitchhiker's Guide to Diplomacy - Wie Diplomatie die Welt erklärt" was published in German by Czernin Verlag, Vienna in 2023. A revised and updated edition was published in English as "Lessons in Diplomacy: Politics, Power and Parties" by Policy Press in September 2024.

== Bibliography ==
=== Non-fiction ===
- Lessons in Diplomacy: Politics, Power and Parties (2024, first published in German in 2023 as The Hitchhiker’s Guide to Diplomacy: Wie Diplomatie die Welt erklärt)

=== Thrillers ===
- Eternal Life (2021, first published as Corona Crime by Robert Pimm, 2020)
- Blood Summit (2022, first published writing as Robert Pimm, 2017)
- Palladium (2022)

=== Comedies ===
- Seven Hotel Stories (2022, first published writing as Robert Pimm, 2020)
- Seven More Hotel Stories (2026)

Diplomatic posts
Preceded by Tony Crombie	Commissioner for the British Indian Ocean Territory and the British Antarctic Territory; 2006–2008	Succeeded by Colin Roberts
Preceded by Tim Barrow	British Ambassador to Ukraine; 2008–2012	Succeeded by Simon Smith
Preceded by Susan le Jeune d'Allegeershecque	British Ambassador to Austria; 2016–2021	Succeeded by Lindsay Skoll
