= Kirsty Hayes =

British diplomat and civil servant

Her Excellency Kirsty Hayes
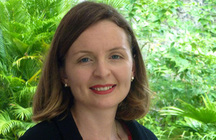

British Ambassador to Argentina
- In office September 2021 – September 2025
- Monarchs: Elizabeth II; Charles III
- Prime Minister: Boris Johnson; Liz Truss; Rishi Sunak; Keir Starmer
- Preceded by: Mark Kent
- Succeeded by: David Cairns

British Ambassador to Portugal
- In office 2014–2018
- Monarch: Elizabeth II
- Prime Minister: David Cameron; Theresa May
- Preceded by: Jill Gallard
- Succeeded by: Chris Sainty

Personal details
- Born: Christine Isobel Paton; 2 February 1977 (age 49) Aberdeen, Scotland
- Spouse: Peter Hayes
- Children: 2
- Education: Dame Alice Harpur School
- Alma mater: University College London; Kingston University
- Occupation: Diplomat

Christine Isobel "Kirsty" Hayes (born 2 February 1977) is a British diplomat and civil servant. She was recently British Ambassador to Argentina. She was British Ambassador to Portugal from 2014 to 2018.

== Early life ==
Hayes was born on 2 February 1977 in Aberdeen, Scotland, to Robert Colin and Rowena Antoinette Paton. She is distantly related to the noted explorer, archaeologist, diplomat and politician, Sir Austen Henry Layard. She was educated at Dame Alice Harpur School, an all-girls private school in Bedford, England. From 1995 to 1998, she studied archaeology at the Institute of Archaeology, University College London. She graduated with a Bachelor of Arts (BA Hons) degree in 1998. She had been offered a place at the University of Cambridge, but turned it down to study at UCL because it offered more opportunities for fieldwork.

She later completed a Master of Arts (MA) degree in International Studies and Diplomacy at the University of London and a Master of Arts degree in Human Resources Strategy at Kingston Business School, Kingston University.

== Diplomatic career ==
In September 1999, Hayes joined the Foreign and Commonwealth Office (FCO) as part of their Fast Stream entry programme, thereby starting a career in diplomacy. Her first appointment was as a desk officer specialising in biodiversity within the Environment Policy Department. In 2000, she moved to Hong Kong where she served as Vice-Consul specialising in politics and economics. In December 2001, she moved to the United States of America. Between December 2001 and February 2002, she worked in Washington, D.C. as the temporary Second Secretary (Economics). Then, from 2002 to 2005, she served as Private Secretary to the British Ambassador to the United States; first Sir Christopher Meyer, and then from 2003, Sir David Manning.

In August 2005, she returned to the United Kingdom to take up an appointment within the Europe Department of the FCO. She served as head of the Institutions/France Team and was a member of the Common Foreign and Security Policy Group. In 2007, she moved to the human resources department. In February 2007, she was head of the Diversity and Development Team within the department. Then, from March to February 2008, she was Deputy Head of the department with responsibilities for training, recruitment and development.

Her husband, Peter Hayes, served as High Commissioner to Sri Lanka and to the Maldives from 2008 to 2010. Between March 2008 and March 2009, she additionally worked as a consultant at the United Nations Development Programme Regional Centre in Colombo, Sri Lanka.

She returned to the UK at the end of 2010. From December 2010 to October 2011, she was head of the Corporate Communications Department, FCO. From November 2011, she was head of the International Organisations Department, FCO. In that role, she was responsible for policy on the United Nations, the Commonwealth, the OSCE, and international issues such as war crimes and sanctions. In addition, she was the UK's lead negotiator at the 2013 Commonwealth Heads of Government Meeting.

In June 2014, Hayes was appointed to be British Ambassador to Portugal in succession to Jill Gallard. She took up the appointment in September 2014. She was replaced in the summer of 2018.

In December 2020, Hayes was appointed to be British Ambassador to Argentina in succession to Mark Kent. She took up the position in September 2021.

== Personal life ==
In 2002, Hayes married Peter Hayes, a fellow diplomat. Together they have two children: one son and one daughter.

She enjoys horse riding, and competes in eventing and show jumping. When she moved to Portugal as the new British ambassador, she transported her horses across Europe and they are now stabled in Cascais.

Diplomatic posts
Preceded by Jill Gallard	British Ambassador to Portugal; 2014–2018	Succeeded by Chris Sainty
