= John Malcolm Macgregor =

British diplomat

John Malcolm Macgregor CVO (born 3 October 1946) is a retired British diplomat who was ambassador to Poland and Austria.

== Career ==
John Malcolm Macgregor was educated at Kibworth Beauchamp Grammar School (now Beauchamp College) and Balliol College, Oxford (where he was organ scholar), then obtained a Certificate in Education at Birmingham University. He taught at Cranleigh School 1969–73, then joined the Diplomatic Service. Between posts at the Foreign and Commonwealth Office he served in New Delhi, Prague, Paris and Düsseldorf before being appointed ambassador to Poland 1998–2000 and to Austria 2003–07. He then retired from the Diplomatic Service and was dean of the University of Kent at Brussels 2007–09. Subsequently, he was a governor of Chichester University, and visiting professor at Instituto Tecnológico Autónomo de México and at Canterbury Christ Church University.

== Family ==
John Malcolm Macgregor is married to Judith Macgregor (née Brown), also a British ambassador. They have three sons and a daughter.

== Sources ==
- MACGREGOR, John Malcolm, Who's Who 2013, A & C Black, 2013; online edn, Oxford University Press, December 2012.

Diplomatic posts
| Preceded by Sir Christopher Hum | British Ambassador to Poland; 1998–2001 | Succeeded by Sir Michael Pakenham |
| Preceded by Antony Ford | British Ambassador to Austria; 2003–2007 | Succeeded by Simon Smith |
