= Chris Sainty =

Former British diplomat (born 1967)

His Excellency Chris Sainty
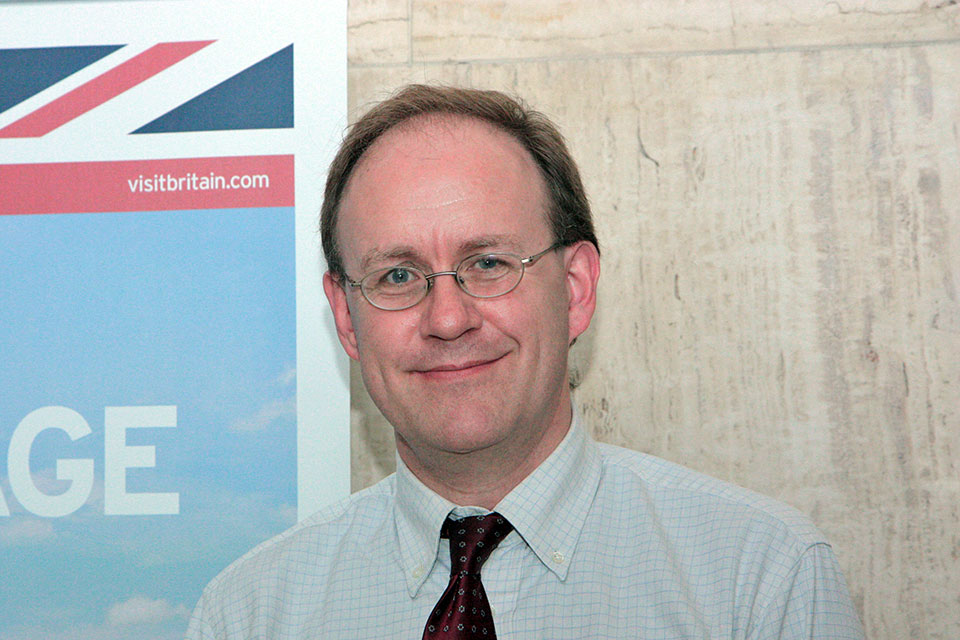

British Ambassador to Portugal
- In office 1 October 2018 – December 2023
- Monarchs: Elizabeth II; Charles III
- Prime Minister: Theresa May; Boris Johnson; Liz Truss; Rishi Sunak
- Preceded by: Kirsty Hayes
- Succeeded by: Lisa Bandari

Personal details
- Born: 29 March 1967 (age 59) London, England
- Children: 3
- Parent: Sir John Sainty (father)
- Education: Westminster School
- Alma mater: New College, Oxford (BA)
- Occupation: Diplomat

Christopher James Sainty (born 29 March 1967) is a British former diplomat and civil servant. He was British Ambassador to Portugal from 2018 to 2023.

== Early life and education ==
Sainty was born on 29 March 1967 in London, England, as the first son of Sir John Sainty and Lady Frances Sainty. He was educated at Westminster School, an all-boys public school attached to Westminster Abbey. He studied mathematics and philosophy at New College, Oxford, graduating with a Bachelor of Arts (BA) degree.

== Career ==
Sainty entered the Foreign and Commonwealth Office (FCO) in 1989, beginning his career as a diplomat.

He was Deputy Head of Mission in The Hague from 2006 to 2008, and in Rome from August 2011 to August 2015. From 2018 to 2023, he served as the British Ambassador to Portugal.

On 25 April 2020, during the COVID-19 pandemic, he won the appreciation of the Portuguese people with online videos of his playing on the piano the two songs that had been used on the radio by the revolutionaries to secretly signal the beginning of the 1974 Carnation Revolution, Paulo de Carvalho's E Depois do Adeus (Portugal's entry in the 1974 Eurovision Song Contest) and Grândola, Vila Morena, a song by Zeca Afonso, a singer who was largely banned from Portuguese radio at the time. The Revolution overthrew the Estado Novo dictatorship. Sainty said that he decided to film himself playing these songs "for fun" and didn't expect the reaction he received, which was thousands of messages of thanks.

Sainty left his ambassadorial post at the end of 2023. At the beginning of May 2024 it was announced that he was to become the chief executive officer of the English-language newspaper, The Portugal News, with the aim of expanding the paper's coverage from the Algarve to Lisbon and Porto.

== Personal life ==
Sainty is married to Sarah. Together they have three children: two daughters and a son.

Diplomatic posts
Preceded by Kirsty Hayes	British Ambassador to Portugal; 2018–2023	Succeeded by Lisa Bandari
