= Robert Murray Keith =

British diplomat

Robert Murray Keith (c. 1697–1774) was a British diplomat. He was descended from a younger son of the 2nd Earl Marischal.

Keith was minister in Vienna in 1748 and from 1753 Minister-plenipotentiary. In 1757, he transferred to St. Petersburg (arriving in 1758) and remained there until October 1762, when the imperial government requested that he be replaced by a nobleman. He then retired to live at the Hermitage near Edinburgh, being known to his friends, among whom were leading men of letters, as "Ambassador Keith."

Keith married Margaret, daughter of Sir William Cunningham, 2nd baronet, of Caprington before 1730 when their son Robert Murray Keith (the younger) was born. Another son was Sir Basil Keith, a naval officer and Governor of Gibraltar. Anne Murray Keith was his daughter.

Diplomatic posts
Preceded by Thomas Robinson	British Minister in Austria; 1748–1757	Succeeded by The Earl of Hyndford
Preceded by Charles Hanbury Williams	Ambassador to Russia; 1758–1762	Succeeded by The Earl of Buckinghamshire
Preceded by Philip Stanhope	British Minister to Saxony; 1767–1771	Succeeded by John Osborne
