= John Sainty (parliamentary official) =

British parliamentary official (1934–2025)

Sir John Christopher Sainty, KCB, FSA (31 December 1934 – 8 June 2025) was a British parliamentary official who was Clerk of the Parliaments from 1983 to 1990.

== Early life and education ==
Born in London on 31 December 1934, Sainty was educated at Winchester College, and New College, Oxford.

== Career ==
After serving as the Private Secretary to the Leader of the House and Clerk of the Journals of the House of Lords, he was appointed Clerk of the Parliaments in 1983, retiring in 1990. He was knighted in the 1986 Queen's Birthday Honours, when he was made a Knight Commander of the Bath (KCB). He was later appointed a Senior Fellow of the Institute of Historical Research and published numerous articles and studies of office holders under the Crown. He was also a Commissioner of the Historical Manuscripts Commission prior to its merger with the Public Record Office to form The National Archives.

== Personal life and death ==
Sainty was the son of Christopher Lawrence Sainty, of Clayton Priory, Hassocks, Sussex, and his first wife Nancy Lee Miller, of Madison, Wisconsin, and Chicago, Illinois. He was married to Frances Sherlock and had three sons:

1. Christopher Sainty, British Ambassador to Portugal from 2018 to 2023
2. Henry Sainty, solicitor, partner, Farrer & Co
3. Edward Sainty

Sainty was also the elder half-brother of the art dealer and historian of Orders of Knighthood Guy Stair Sainty.

Sir John Sainty died on 8 June 2025, at the age of 90.

== Publications ==
- The Lord Lieutenants and their Deputies (Phillimore, 2007)
- The Judges of England 1272–1990: a list of judges of the superior courts (1993)
- A List of English Law Officers, King's Counsel and Holders of Patents of Precedence (Selden Society, supplementary ser. vol. 7, 1987)
- Parliamentary Functions of the Sovereign since 1509 (1980)
- Colonial Office Officials: officials of the Secretary of State for War, 1794-1801, etc. London: IHR (1976)
- Home Office officials, 1782–1870 London: Athlone Press & IHR (1975)
- Admiralty Officials, 1660–1870 (1975)
- "The Origins of House of Lords Leadership", Bulletin of the Institute of Historical Research (1974)
- Officials of the Secretaries of State, 1660–1782 (1973)
- The Origin of the Office of Chairman of Committees in the House of Lords (HLRO Memorandum no. 52, 1973)
- The Lord Lieutenants of counties 1585–1642 London: IHR (1970)
