= Andrew Jonathan Mitchell =

British ambassador and civil servant

His Excellency Andrew Mitchell CMG
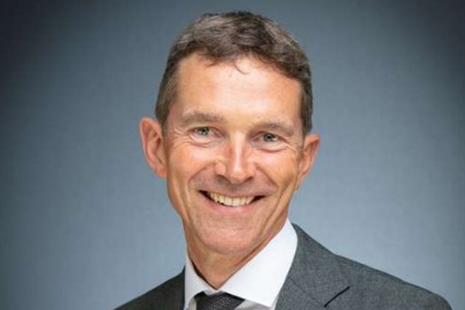

British Ambassador to Germany
- Incumbent
- Assumed office 4 September 2024
- Monarch: Charles III
- Prime Minister: Keir Starmer; Andy Burnham
- Preceded by: Jill Gallard

British Ambassador to Sweden
- In office 2007–2011
- Monarch: Elizabeth II
- Prime Minister: Tony Blair; Gordon Brown; David Cameron
- Preceded by: Anthony Cary
- Succeeded by: Paul Johnston

Personal details
- Born: 7 March 1967 (age 59) Ormskirk, England
- Children: 3
- Education: The Queen's College, Oxford

Andrew Jonathan Mitchell CMG (born 7 March 1967) is a British ambassador and civil servant. From 4 September 2024, he has served as the British ambassador to Germany.

== Early life ==
Mitchell was educated at St Mary's College, Crosby, and Queen's College, Oxford, where he held the Laming Scholarship and a College Bursary. In 1990 he graduated BA in Modern Languages, with first class honours, and won the Markham Prize.

== Career ==
Mitchell joined the Foreign and Commonwealth Office in 1991, serving in Bonn and Kathmandu as well as in the UK. He was appointed British Ambassador to Sweden in 2007, serving for four years.

Returning to the Whitehall, Mitchell was the Foreign Office's director for the 2012 Summer Olympics and 2012 Summer Paralympics, and thence for prosperity for three years until 2014. He then moved to the private sector, working as international director for M-Integrated Solutions for three years from 2015, before returning to government in 2018 as HM Trade Commissioner for Europe.

In 2020, Mitchell moved to the Department for International Trade as director-general overseeing "markets and supply chains", from 2021 "exports and UK trade", and from 2023 "domestic and international markets and exports" in the renamed Department for Business and Trade.

== Personal life ==
In 1996, Mitchell married Helen Magee, and they have two sons and one daughter. He speaks English, German, French, Spanish and Swedish.

== Honours ==
Mitchell was appointed a Companion of the Order of St Michael and St George (CMG) in New Year Honours for 2013, "for services to London 2012 Olympic and Paralympic Games".

Diplomatic posts
Preceded by Anthony Cary	British Ambassador to Sweden; 2007–2011	Succeeded by Paul Johnston
Preceded by Jill Gallard	British Ambassador to Germany; 2024–present	Incumbent
