= Lindsay Skoll =

British diplomat

Her Excellency Lindsay Skoll CMG
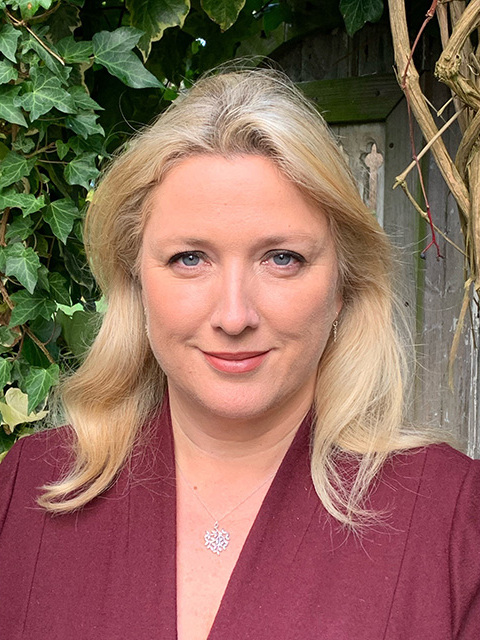

Principal of Jesus College, Oxford
- Incumbent
- Assumed office 1 August 2026
- Preceded by: Sir Nigel Shadbolt

British Ambassador to Austria
- In office January 2021 – July 2026
- Monarchs: Elizabeth II; Charles III
- Prime Minister: Boris Johnson; Liz Truss; Rishi Sunak; Keir Starmer
- Preceded by: Leigh Turner
- Succeeded by: Nick Pickard

Personal details
- Born: 26 September 1970 (age 55)
- Education: University of Nottingham

Lindsay Samantha Skoll CMG (born 26 September 1970) is a British diplomat. From 2021 to 2026, she served as the Ambassador of the United Kingdom to Austria and the UK Permanent Representative to the United Nations and other International Organisations in Vienna. She became Principal of Jesus College, Oxford on 1 August 2026.

== Early life and education ==
Skoll is from Manchester. She graduated with a Bachelor of Arts (BA) degree in history with Russian from the University of Nottingham in 1992. She received a TEFL qualification from the University of Edinburgh in 1993.

== Career ==
Skoll joined the Foreign and Commonwealth Office in 1996, having previously worked for the Japanese Ministry of Education.

=== High Commissioner to the Republic of Seychelles ===
Skoll was British High Commissioner to the Republic of Seychelles between 2012 and 2015. Upon leaving the post, she called her mission "eventful, but hopeful". She officiated at the first same sex marriage to occur in Seychelles. The marriage was between two men, one a British national and the other a Seychellois national who held a British passport.

Seychelles Principal Secretary for Foreign Affairs Maurice Loustau-Lalanne described Skoll's decision to conduct the marriage as “lacking in sensitivity”. The British High Commission responded to criticism by stating that the men “were legally entitled to be married by an appropriate British official on British territory”.

=== Deputy Head of Mission, Moscow ===
Skoll served as Deputy Head of Mission at the Embassy of the United Kingdom, Moscow between 2018 and 2020. She gave a speech during the 2018 FIFA World Cup at Volgograd, where she paid tribute to the sacrifice of the people of Volgograd during the Second World War, when the city was known as Stalingrad.

=== Ambassador to Austria ===
Skoll was appointed Ambassador to Austria in September 2021.

=== Principal of Jesus College, Oxford ===
On 30 July 2025 it was announced that Skoll had been elected to succeed Sir Nigel Shadbolt as Principal of Jesus College at the University of Oxford. Skoll took up the role on 1 August 2026 upon Shadbolt's retirement, becoming the 32nd person and first woman to serve as Principal of the college.
