= Basil Keith =

British naval officer and Governor of Jamaica

Captain Sir Basil Keith
- Born: c.1734
- Died: 15 November 1777; Jamaica
- Relatives: Robert Murray Keith (father); Sir Robert Murray Keith (brother)
- Military career
- Allegiance: Kingdom of Great Britain
- Branch: Royal Navy
- Service years: 1747–1777
- Rank: Captain
- Commands: HMS Medway; HMS Badger; HMS Dover; HMS Amazon; HMS Levant; HMS Preston; HMS Pearl; Governor of Jamaica
- Conflicts: War of the Austrian Succession; Second Battle of Cape Finisterre; Seven Years' War; American Revolutionary War
- Awards: Knight bachelor (1772)

Sir Basil Keith (c.1734 – 15 November 1777) was a British naval officer and Governor of Jamaica.

He was born the second son of diplomat Robert Murray Keith and the younger brother of Lieutenant-General Robert Keith.

Keith joined the Navy, and was promoted lieutenant in 1756 while serving in HMS Badger. He was raised to commander in 1758 and appointed to HMS Dover. He was finally promoted captain in 1760 and given command in turn of HMS Amazon, Levant, Preston and Pearl.

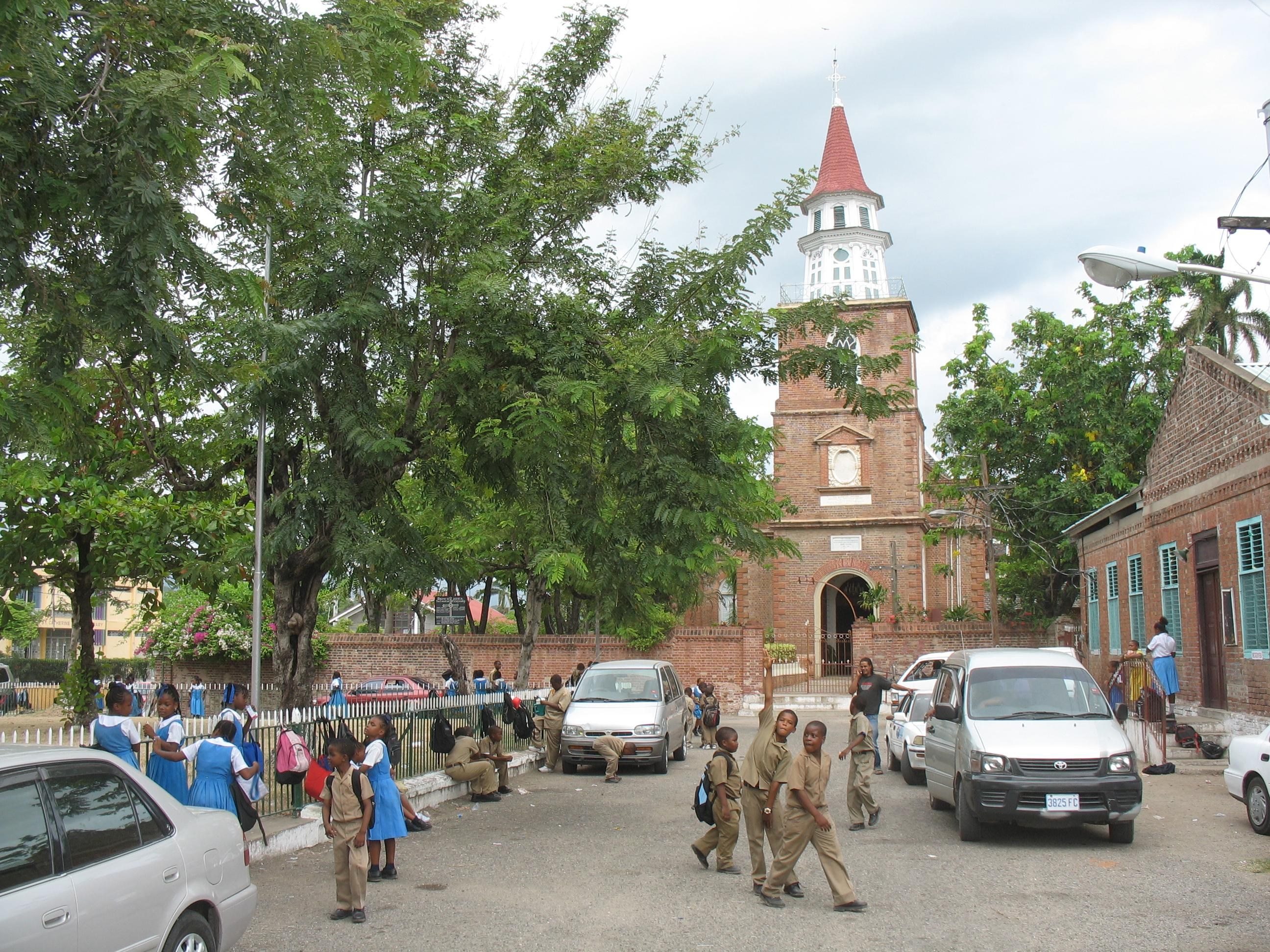
St Jago de la Vega cathedral, Spanish Town

He was knighted on 10 June 1772 and appointed Governor of Jamaica in February 1773, taking up his post in January 1774.

He died in Jamaica in 1777 and a large marble monument by sculptor Joseph Wilton was erected in his honour in 1780 at St Catherine's Parish Church (St Jago de la Vega church) in the old capital of Spanish Town.
