= Victoria Billing =

British diplomat

Her Excellency Victoria Billing OBE
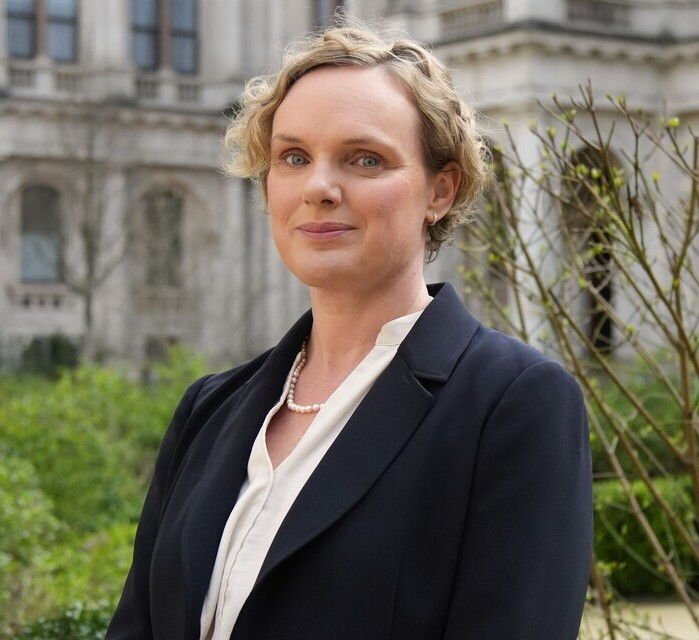
- Billing in 2026

British Ambassador to Denmark
- Incumbent
- Assumed office April 2026
- Monarch: Charles III
- Prime Minister: Keir Starmer; Andy Burnham
- Preceded by: Joëlle Jenny

Personal details
- Born: 31 May 1975 (age 51)

Victoria Elizabeth Billing, OBE (born 31 May 1975) is a British diplomat who has been His Majesty's Ambassador to the Kingdom of Denmark since April 2026.

== Diplomatic career ==
Having entered the Foreign and Commonwealth Office in 1997, most of her career has been focused on countries around the Mediterranean Sea including the Western Balkans and a posting to Jerusalem.

She was Ambassador to Senegal and non-resident Ambassador to Cape Verde and Guinea Bissau from July 2019 to 2022. She was then director of Europe (Mediterranean and Western Balkans) at the Foreign, Commonwealth and Development Office from 2022 to 2025. On 18 March 2026, she was announced as the next British Ambassador to Denmark, in succession to Joëlle Jenny. On 25 March 2026, she had an audience with King Charles III and "kissed hands".

== Personal life ==
In 2008, Billing married Robert Tinline, a fellow diplomat.
