= William Ehrman =

British diplomat

Sir William Ehrman KCMG

British Ambassador to China
- In office 15 March 2006 – January 2010
- Monarch: Elizabeth II
- President: Hu Jintao
- Prime Minister: Tony Blair; Gordon Brown
- Premier: Wen Jiabao
- Preceded by: Sir Christopher Hum
- Succeeded by: Sir Sebastian Wood

British Ambassador to Luxembourg
- In office 1998–2000
- Monarch: Elizabeth II
- Prime Minister: Tony Blair
- Preceded by: Nick Elam
- Succeeded by: Gordon Wetherell

Personal details
- Born: 28 August 1950 (age 76)
- Spouse: Penelope Anne LePatourel
- Children: 4
- Parent(s): John Patrick William Ehrman (father); Susan Blake (mother)
- Education: Eton College; Trinity College, Cambridge

Sir William Geoffrey Ehrman KCMG (born 28 August 1950) is a retired British diplomat and former chairman of the Joint Intelligence Committee.

== Early life ==
Ehrman was born on 28 August 1950 to the historian John Patrick William Ehrman and Susan Blake. He was educated at Lockers Park School and Eton College, followed by Trinity College, Cambridge, from which he graduated with a first class degree in Chinese.

== Career ==
Ehrman joined the British Diplomatic Service in 1973 and had postings in Beijing, New York and Hong Kong. He was Principal Private Secretary to three Foreign Secretaries from 1995 to 1997 and the British Ambassador to Luxembourg from 1998 to 2000.

He was the Foreign and Commonwealth Office's Director General for Defence and Intelligence between 2002 and 2004, before becoming Chairman of the United Kingdom's Joint Intelligence Committee from 2004 to 2005 and British Ambassador to China from 2006 to 2010.

== Personal life ==
Ehrman is married to Penelope Anne Le Patourel (daughter of Brigadier Wallace Le Patourel VC), and the couple have three daughters and a son.

Diplomatic posts
Preceded by Sir John Sawers	Principal Private Secretary to the Foreign Secretary; 1995–1997	Succeeded by Sir John Grant
Preceded by Nick Elam	British Ambassador to Luxembourg; 1998–2000	Succeeded by Gordon Wetherell
Preceded by Lord Ricketts	Director, International Security of the Foreign Office; 2000–2002	Succeeded by Edward Oakden
Preceded by Sir Stephen Wright	Director-General, Defence and Intelligence of the Foreign Office; 2002–2004	Succeeded by Sir David Richmond
Preceded by Sir Christopher Hum	British Ambassador to China; 2006–2010	Succeeded by Sir Sebastian Wood
Government offices
Preceded by Sir John Scarlett	Chairman of the Joint Intelligence Committee; 2004–2005	Succeeded by Sir Richard Mottram
