= Michael Llewellyn-Smith =

British diplomat and academic

Sir Michael John Llewellyn-Smith KCVO CMG
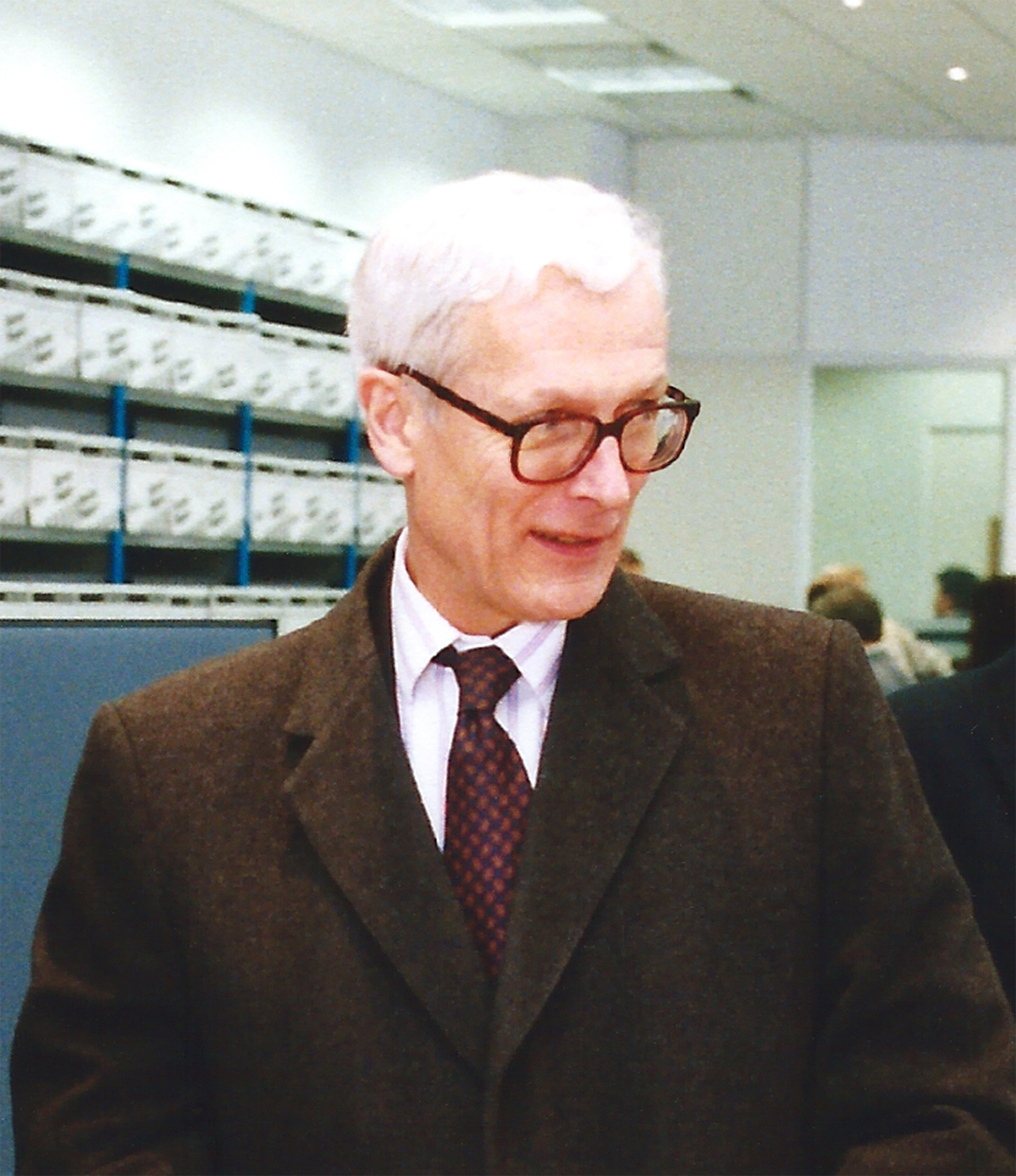
- Photographed in Warsaw, 1995
- Born: 25 April 1939 (age 87)

Academic background
- Education: Wellington College; New College, Oxford

Ambassador of the United Kingdom to Poland
- In office 1991–1996
- Monarch: Elizabeth II
- Prime Minister: John Major
- Preceded by: Stephen Barrett
- Succeeded by: Christopher Hum

Ambassador of the United Kingdom to Greece
- In office 1996–1999
- Monarch: Elizabeth II
- Prime Minister: John Major; Tony Blair (from 1997)
- Preceded by: Oliver Miles
- Succeeded by: David Madden

Sir Michael John Llewellyn-Smith KCVO CMG (born 25 April 1939) is a retired British diplomat and academic. He served as Ambassador to Poland from 1991 to 1996 and Ambassador to Greece from 1996 to 1999. He is visiting professor at the Centre for Hellenic Studies, King's College London.

== Early life ==
Llewellyn-Smith was born in 1939. He was educated at Wellington College, a private school in Crowthorne, Berkshire. He attended New College, Oxford, where he studied classics, ancient history and philosophy. He completed a DPhil at St Anthony's College, Oxford. This was later published as Ionian Vision: Greece in Asia Minor 1919-1922.

== Diplomatic career ==
Llewellyn-Smith joined Her Majesty's Diplomatic Service in 1970. On 29 March 1980, he was appointed Consul-General at Athens. He served as UK Ambassador to Poland (1991-96) and as ambassador Greece (1996-99).

== Later life ==
Following retirement, Llewellyn-Smith has spent his time writing and lecturing about Greek history and culture. He is visiting professor at the Centre for Hellenic Studies, King's College London. He is a regular speaker on Swan Hellenic cruises.

== Honours ==
On 25 March 1996, Llewellyn-Smith was appointed Knight Commander of the Royal Victorian Order (KCVO). He is an Honorary Fellow of St Antony's College, University of Oxford.

== Writings ==
In 1965, he published The Great Island: A Study of Crete. In 1973, he published the book Ionian Vision: Greece in Asia Minor, 1919–1922 on the Asia Minor Campaign. In 2004, he published Athens: A Cultural and Literary History. In 2021, he published Venizelos: The Making of a Greek Statesman 1864–1914, on the Greek politician Eleftherios Venizelos.
