= Jill Gallard =

British diplomat

Her Excellency Jill Gallard CMG CVO
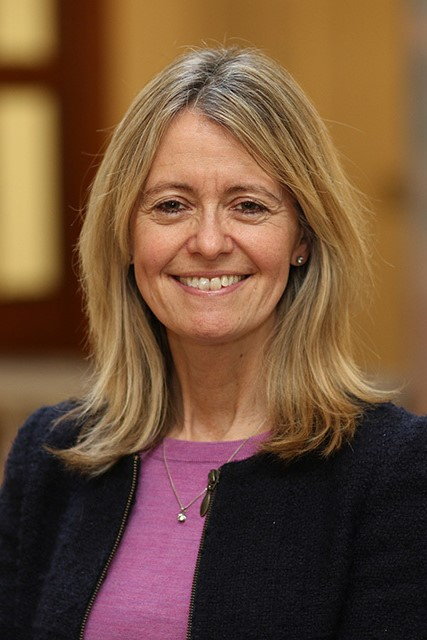

British Ambassador to Germany
- In office 11 November 2020 – 4 September 2024
- Monarchs: Elizabeth II; Charles III
- Prime Minister: Boris Johnson; Liz Truss; Rishi Sunak; Keir Starmer
- Preceded by: Sir Sebastian Wood
- Succeeded by: Andrew Jonathan Mitchell

British Ambassador to Portugal
- In office 2011–2014
- Monarch: Elizabeth II
- Prime Minister: David Cameron
- Preceded by: Alexander Ellis
- Succeeded by: Kirsty Hayes

Personal details
- Born: Jill Parkinson Omagh, Northern Ireland
- Spouse: Dominic Gallard
- Children: 2
- Education: University of Edinburgh

Jill Gallard CMG CVO is a British diplomat who served as British Ambassador to Germany from November 2020 to September 2024. Previously she was the British Ambassador to Portugal, director of human resources at the Foreign and Commonwealth Office and deputy political director at the Foreign and Commonwealth Office.

== Early life ==
Born in Omagh, Northern Ireland, and raised in Omagh and County Antrim, Gallard was educated at Ballyclare High School and gained an MA degree in French and Spanish from the University of Edinburgh.

== Career ==
Gallard joined the Foreign and Commonwealth Office (FCO) in 1991. She has served at Madrid and Prague and in various posts at the FCO, including at the European Commission in Brussels. She was Ambassador to Portugal from 2011 to 2014 and director of human resources at the FCO from 2014 to 2018.

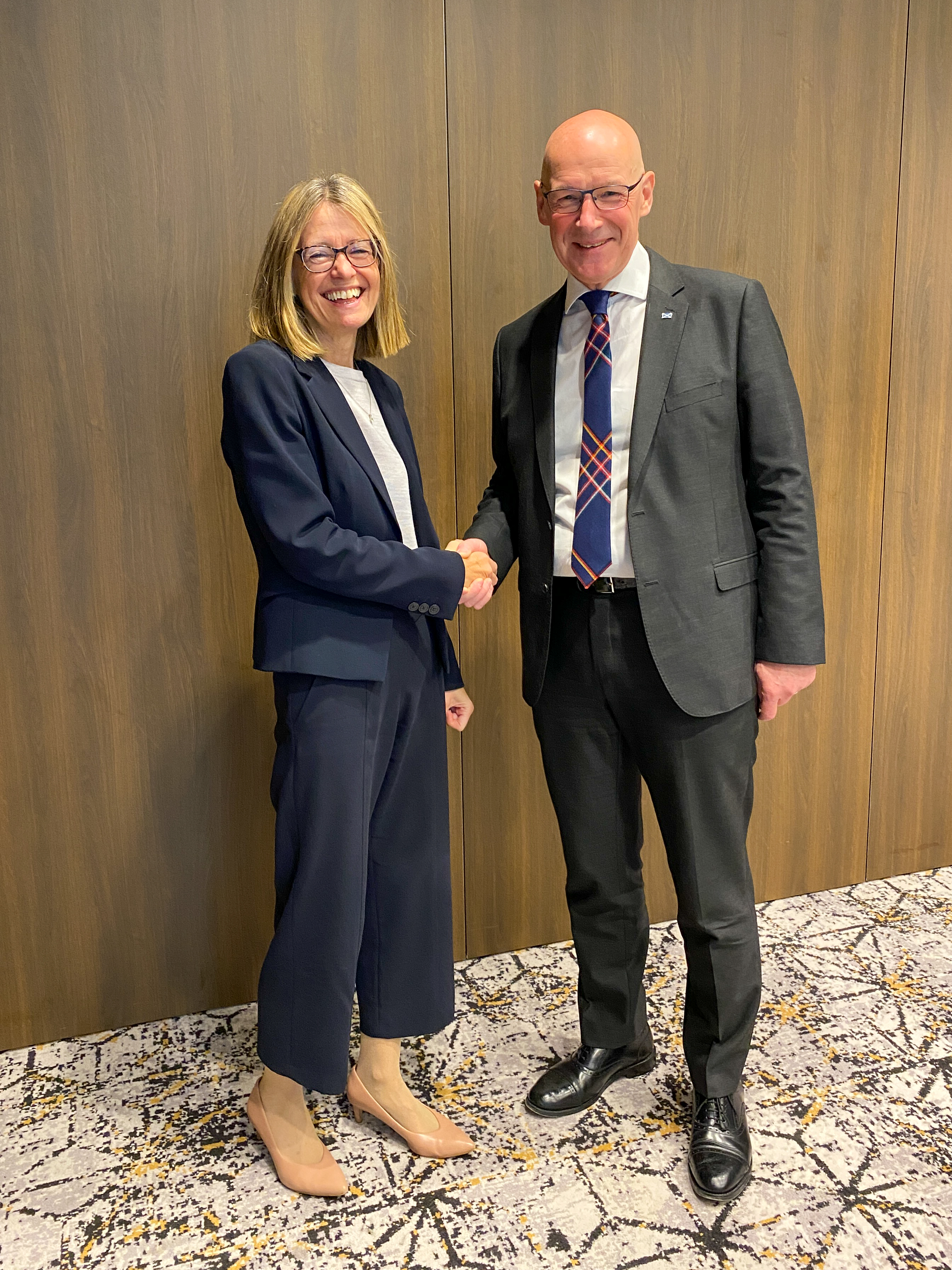
with the Scottish First Minister in 2024

Gallard was appointed CMG in the 2018 Birthday Honours.

From 2018 to 2020, she was deputy political director and director of the Western Balkans and Eastern Mediterranean at the FCO.

In July 2020, Gallard was appointed Ambassador to Germany and took up the position in November. She was the first ever woman to hold the position. In March 2023 she received King Charles III and Queen Camilla on their first outbound state visit. In honour of this she was appointed a Commander of The Royal Victorian Order in November 2023, with the appointment backdated to the date of the state visit. In March 2024 it was announced that her successor would be Andrew Jonathan Mitchell from September 2024, with Gallard transferring to another posting.

She serves as a Trustee of the Imperial War Museum and as a non-executive Council Member of Lancaster University.

She is expected to take up the Mastership of Magdalene College, Cambridge on 1 October 2027, succeeding Sir Christopher Greenwood.

== Personal life ==
Gallard is married and has two children. She is multilingual.

Diplomatic posts
Preceded by Alexander Ellis	British Ambassador to Portugal; 2011–2014	Succeeded by Kirsty Hayes
Preceded by Sir Sebastian Wood	British Ambassador to Germany; 2020–2024	Succeeded by Andrew Jonathan Mitchell
