= Stephen Lesieur =

Swiss-born English ambassador

Stephen Lesieur or Le Sieur (fl. 1575 –1640) was a Swiss-born English ambassador to Denmark, Florence, and the Holy Roman Empire.

== Career ==
Lesieur was born in Geneva, came to England in 1575, and was first employed as a servant of Sir Philip Sidney.

In March 1583 an envoy in London collecting money for the church in Geneva, Jean Maillet, met Lesieur and they discussed efforts to raise a ransom for the English diplomat Daniel Rogers, who had been captured by Maarten Schenck van Nydeggen.

Lesieur came to Edinburgh as the secretary of Robert Sidney in August 1588 and made the acquaintance of a Flemish mining engineer, Eustachius Roche.

The Danish council was angered by a letter from Queen Elizabeth which he brought in October 1599, and they claimed to believe it came from private persons, rather than the queen or her advisors. Lesieur was given a gift of Christian IV's portrait.

In 1602 he was appointed as assistant to an embassy sent to Bremen to meet Danish ambassadors including Manderup Parsberg and Jonas Charisius to discuss fishing rights. The ambassadors were Ralph, Lord Eure, Sir John Herbert, and Daniel Donne.

After the Union of the Crowns in 1603 it was said Lesieur would be sent to Germany to announce King James' accession to the throne of England, while Anthony Standen was sent to Italy. He was ambassador to the Holy Roman Empire in 1603-1604 and 1610-1614, and ambassador to Florence in 1608-1609.

On 12 February 1603 Lesieur wrote from Bremen to Christian IV of Denmark, sending a miniature portrait of Queen Elizabeth that he had commissioned in London at Christian's request. James VI and I paid him in June 1603 for his role as assistant ambassador to Denmark for Queen Elizabeth, at a rate of forty shillings a day. On 17 August he wrote from Neukloster near Wismar to Robert Cecil detailing his movements and meetings, following his audience with Charles I, Duke of Mecklenburg.

He was kinghted in March 1608 and was preparing to go to Italy when one of his companions and cousins, the eldest son of Sir Richard Norton, was challenged to a duel by Henry Clare (a follower of the Earl of Montgomery) for wrongs done to his sister. Lesieur wrote to the Earl of Salisbury to prevent a fight. The young man, later Sir Richard Norton of Rotherfield (d. 1646) joined the embassy in Florence.

The Governor of Vlissengen, John Throckmorton heard in October 1612 that Lesieur had a "sour" audience with the Emperor, and a better reception from Archduke Maximilian, and had gone to the Duke of Brunswick to offer condolences on the death of his father.

In May 1614 Elizabeth Stuart, Queen of Bohemia wrote to her father King James saying that Lesieur could explain the actions of Colonel Schönberg that would make him a suitable husband for her lady in waiting, Anne Dudley, daughter of Theodosia Harington and Edward Sutton, 5th Baron Dudley.

In 1633 the printer William Fitzer dedicated an edition of Philip Sidney's letters to Lesieur, who had given him a volume of Sidney's correspondence with Hubert Languet.

The dates of Lesieur's birth and death are uncertain. He lived at Chiswick in his old age. He married Elizabeth Dabridgecourt in 1609, they had a daughter Margaret born in 1612.
