= Brussels School of International Studies =

Specialised postgraduate school

- Type: Public
- Established: 1998
- Affiliations: University of Kent, Vrije Universiteit Brussel and Université Libre de Bruxelles
- Dean: Professor Jeremy Carrette, Dean for Europe
- Location: Brussels, Belgium
- Campus: Urban
- Website: http://www.kent.ac.uk/brussels/BSIS

The University of Kent's Brussels School of International Studies was a specialised postgraduate school offering international studies in Brussels, Belgium. There are approximately 220 postgraduate students pursuing degrees at the school, drawn from over 65 countries. The school has more than 1400 alumni.

== Genesis ==
The Brussels School of International Studies began as an initiative of the Department of Politics and International Relations of the University of Kent based in Canterbury. The original concept was devised by Professor AJR Groom of Kent and Professor Gustaaf Geeraerts of the Vrije Universiteit Brussel (VUB), whilst discussing the future of European education at a pan-European conference of International Relations. The then recently opened high-speed rail link from Ashford, near Canterbury, to Brussels, made such trans-border educational cooperation technically feasible. The partnership was extended to include Professor Eric Remacle, then director of the Institute for European Studies (IES) of the Universite Libre de Bruxelles (ULB), and the idea for a trilateral inter-institutional program in International Relations was born.

The original concept was for a master's program to be offered in Brussels, in English, taught by members of staff from all three institutions, with the degree conferred under the seals of all three universities. To reflect the cooperative venture, the program was initially to be the "Tri-University Program in International Relations in Brussels".

Notably, the initiative predated the Bologna Declaration by several years, and the concept anticipated many of the later policy developments at the European level to create a cooperative and integrated educational space within the European Union. The school continues to operate in partnership with the two Brussels universities.

Dr Jarrod Wiener was seconded from Kent in 1998 to found the program, now called the "Brussels School of International Studies", and there was participation in teaching from all three universities.

== Faculty ==
From 1998 to 2000, Dr Wiener directed the school and its only program, the MA in international relations. In 2000, market demand dictated that Kent's flagship MA in International Conflict Analysis be launched in Brussels, and Dr Christopher Daase was appointed as its first program director. Dr Daase held that post from 2000 to 2003, leaving when he became full professor at LMU Munich. He was succeeded by AJR Groom.

The school expanded rapidly to include other departments of the University of Kent.

In 2002, the Kent Law School began offering programs in Brussels. Professor Wade Mansell led the creation of a joint LLM in International Law with International Relations at BSIS, and Dr Harm Schepel became the first member of the Kent Law School to be seconded to BSIS in 2002, whereupon he launched the LLM in International Economic Law.

The Kent School for Social Policy Sociology and Social Research (SSPSSR) then launched an MA in International Migration at the Brussels School, appointing Dr Amanda Klekowski Von Koppenfels as the program coordinator, drawing on her extensive academic expertise and experience with the International Organisation for Migration in Brussels.

More programs under the Department of Politics and International Relations were launched as well. The MA in International Political Economy, originally designed by Dr Wiener for the London Centre, was transposed, and Dr Wiener created two new programs: the MA in European Public Policy, and the MA in Political Strategy and Communication. Internationally recognised political theorist, Dr Albena Azmanova, was appointed to assume the directorship of the MA in International Political Economy and the MA in European Public Policy, while Dr Wiener directed the MA in Political Strategy and Communication.

The school now hosts eight permanent members of academic staff across a range of subjects - conflict, development, migration, political strategy, diplomacy, foreign affairs and international law.

In 2015, the School moved to new premises at Boulevard Louis Schmidt 2a in Etterbeek. BSIS hosts a strong lecture series throughout the terms, hosts summers schools and has a strong research community.

== The University of Kent at Brussels ==
What had started as an initiative of a single department had grown to include three academic departments of Kent by 2005. Space issues, as well as the needs for administrative coordination, required the development of a more formal structure. Dr Wiener was appointed the founding dean of the University of Kent at Brussels, and was later succeeded by John Macgregor, former British ambassador to Austria. The current dean is Professor Jeremy Carrette, professor of religion at the University of Kent.
