= Susan le Jeune d'Allegeershecque =

British diplomat

Susan le Jeune d'Allegeershecque CMG OStJ
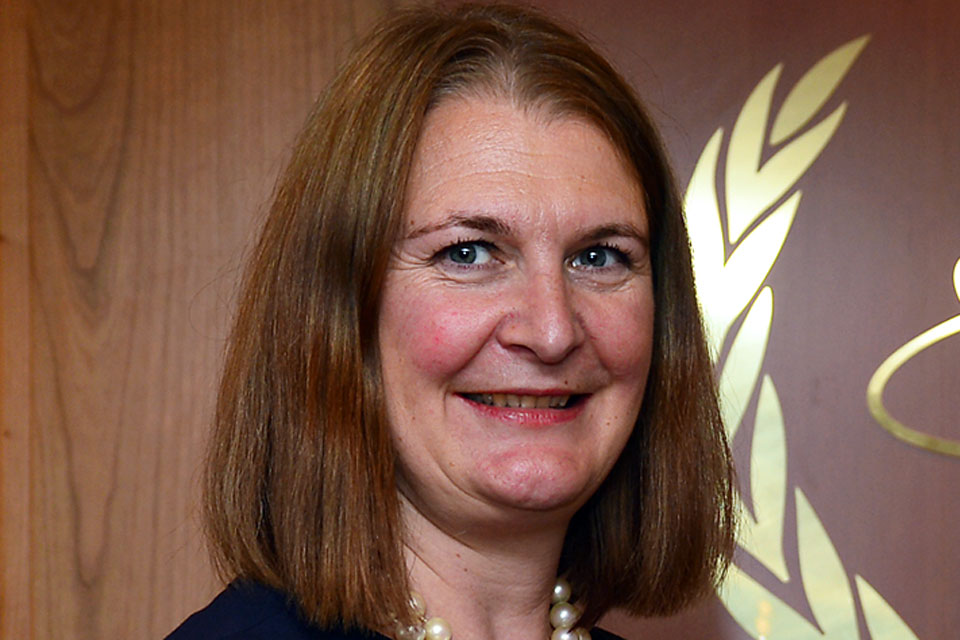

British High Commissioner to Canada
- In office August 1, 2017 – August 30, 2021
- Monarch: Elizabeth II
- Prime Minister: Theresa May; Boris Johnson
- Preceded by: Howard Drake
- Succeeded by: Susannah Goshko

British Ambassador to Austria
- In office August 2012 – August 2016
- Monarch: Elizabeth II
- Prime Minister: David Cameron; Theresa May
- Preceded by: Simon Smith
- Succeeded by: Leigh Turner

Personal details
- Born: Susan Jane Miller; 29 April 1963 (age 63)
- Spouse: Stephane le Jeune d'Allegeershecque
- Education: University of Bristol
- Occupation: Diplomat

Susan le Jeune d'Allegeershecque CMG OStJ (born Susan Jane Miller; born 29 April 1963) is a British diplomat who, most recently, served as British High Commissioner to Canada from 2017 to 2021. She previously served as British Ambassador to Austria from 2012 to 2016.

== Life and career ==
Educated at Ipswich High School for Girls, she took a BA degree from the University of Bristol and immediately joined the Foreign and Commonwealth Office in 1985. She served in London and at the permanent representation to the European Union, the High Commission in Singapore, and the embassies in Venezuela, Colombia, and the United States.

In 2007, she took over as Director of Human Resources at the Foreign Office, replacing Sir David Warren. She served there for four years until 2011, when she was replaced by Menna Rawlings.

In the New Year Honours for 2010, le Jeune d'Allegeershecque was appointed a Companion of the Order of St Michael and St George (CMG).

She then served as British Ambassador to Austria from 2012 until 2016, a post which included serving as the UK's permanent representative to the international organisations based in Vienna, such as the United Nations.

In February 2017, it was announced that le Jeune d'Allegeershecque would succeed Howard Drake from August 2017 as British High Commissioner to Canada. She left this position in August 2021, and was succeeded by Susannah Goshko.

In November 2022, she was appointed an Officer of the Order of St John having served as Secretary-General of the Order since December 2021

Government offices
Preceded by Sir David Warren	Director of Human Resources, Foreign and Commonwealth Office; 2007–2012	Succeeded by Menna Rawlings
Diplomatic posts
Preceded by Simon Smith	Ambassador to Austria; 2012–2016	Succeeded by Leigh Turner
Preceded by Howard Drake	High Commissioner to Canada; 2017–2021	Succeeded by Susannah Goshko
