= HMS Preston (1757) =

Ship of the line of the Royal Navy

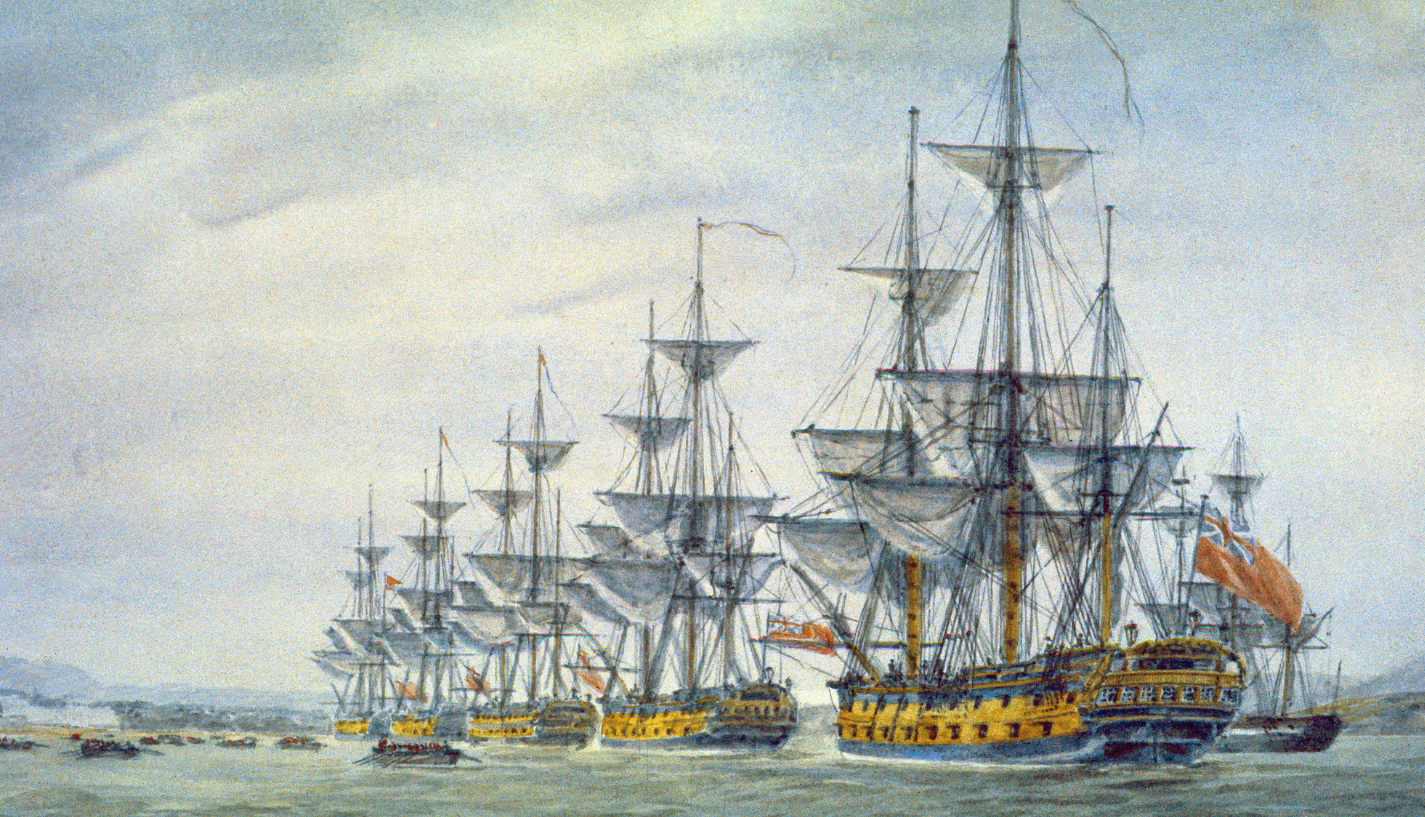
- Preston at the occupation of Newport, Rhode Island on 8 December 1776

History

Great Britain
- Name: HMS Preston
- Ordered: 28 March 1751
- Builder: Deptford Dockyard
- Launched: 7 February 1757
- Fate: Broken up, 1815
- Notes: Participated in: Battle of Dogger Bank

General characteristics
- Class & type: 1745 Establishment 50-gun fourth rate ship of the line
- Tons burthen: 1044 (bm)
- Length: 150 ft (45.7 m) (gundeck)
- Beam: 42 ft 8 in (13.0 m)
- Depth of hold: 18 ft 6 in (5.6 m)
- Propulsion: Sails
- Sail plan: Full-rigged ship
- Armament: Gundeck: 22 × 24-pounder guns; Upper gundeck: 22 × 12-pounder guns; QD: 4 × 6-pounder guns; Fc: 2 × 6-pounder guns

HMS Preston was a 50-gun fourth rate ship of the line of the Royal Navy, built at Deptford Dockyard by Adam Hayes to the draught specified in the 1745 Establishment, and launched on 7 February 1757.

== Service history ==
From May until October 1769 she was under command of Captain Basil Keith.

From January 1774 until April 1776 she was under command of Captain John Robinson with a crew of 350 men. Cuthbert Collingwood was a midshipman on the ship during this period.

She took part in the Naval operations in the American Revolutionary War under William Hotham. On 13 August 1778, cut off from her squadron by a storm, she encountered the French 74-gun Marseillois, which she fought indecisively.

Taking part in the Battle of Dogger Bank (1781) where she was disabled, with her commander, Captain Alexander Graeme losing an arm, she was sailed back to the Thames by Lieutenant Saumarez

From March 1783 until April 1784 she was under command of Captain George Martin.

In 1785, Preston was converted to serve as a sheer hulk, and she was eventually broken up at Woolwich in January 1815.
