= Robert Murray Keith (British Army officer) =

British soldier, diplomat and politician (1730–1795)

Lieutenant-General The Right Honourable Sir Robert Murray Keith KB FRSE
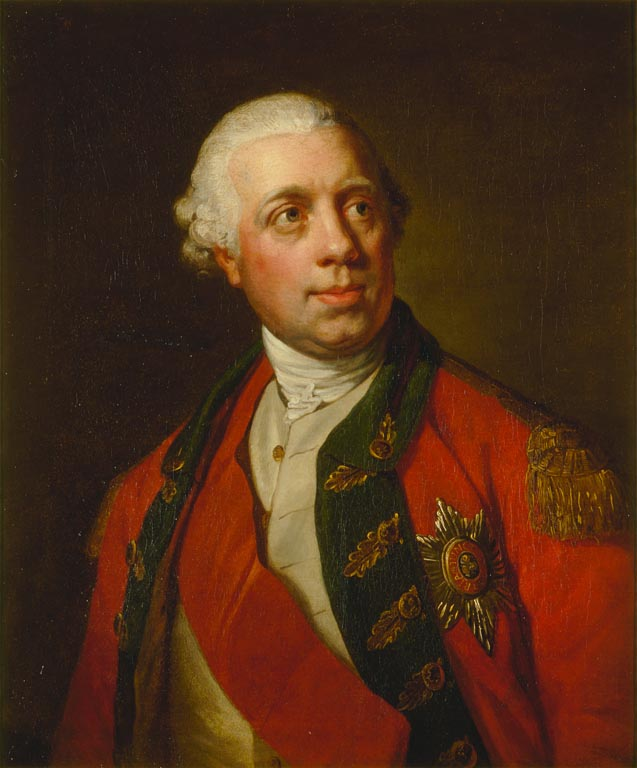
- Born: 20 September 1730; Edinburgh, Scotland
- Died: 22 June 1795 (aged 64); Hammersmith, London, England

Lieutenant-General Sir Robert Murray Keith KB PC FRSE (20 September 1730 – 22 June 1795) was a British soldier, diplomat and politician who sat in the House of Commons from 1775 to 1780.

== Early life ==
He was born in Edinburgh, the eldest son of Robert Murray Keith and his wife Margaret, daughter of Sir William Cunningham, 2nd baronet, of Caprington. He was educated at the High School in Edinburgh.

He took the additional name Murray on inheriting the estates of Murrayshall (formerly Halmyre) at the death of his great-uncle Robert Murray on 8 February 1743.

== Soldier ==
Destined for a military career, he was sent to an academy in London and was commissioned a cornet in 1747 and quickly transferred to a Scots Brigade in Dutch service, with which he remained until the regiment was reduced in 1752. He then returned to England, but failed to gain a British commission. He therefore travelled with Frederick Campbell to visit his father in Vienna, where he was Minister and look for military employment. In 1755, he was recalled to the Scots Brigade, but rejoined the British Army in 1757 as a captain in the 73rd Regiment of Foot. On the recommendation of Colonel Henry Seymour Conway, he was made aide-de-camp to Lord George Sackville and fought at the Battle of Minden. A month later he carried news of Sackville resignation to London, where he met William Pitt the Elder. He employed Keith to raise companies of Highland Volunteers, later called 87th Regiment of Foot (Keith's Highlanders), with him as major commandant, and from 1760 colonel commandant. From 1760 to 1762, his regiment served in Germany, involved in several engagements. However, after the war, his regiment was disbanded, and he was placed on half pay. After visiting Paris, he settled in London.

== Diplomat and later life ==
Keith's knowledge of German and friendship with Pitt and Conway enabled him to be appointed Envoy-extraordinary to Saxony in 1769. He transferred in 1771 to be minister in Copenhagen. In the face of a worsening political situation for Johan Friedrich Struensee the minister who ruled Denmark for the insane Christian VII and his Queen Caroline Matilda, a sister of George III of Great Britain (and without instructions), he threatened a British naval bombardment of Copenhagen if the queen was harmed. This frightened the Danes and earned the gratitude of the king who made him a Knight of the Bath. They allowed the queen to withdraw to Hanover. After escorting her there he returned to London.

His next appointment was as Envoy-extraordinary to Vienna, where he remained 20 years. This post was a difficult one as he at times rarely received instructions from London. Furthermore, relations were at times strained during Austria's War with Turkey at the end of his time there.

He returned home in 1774 to settle his father's estate. His London friends wanted him to enter Parliament for Peeblesshire in 1775. He was elected and retained the seat until 1780, without ever attending the House of Commons. His financial position was improved by his being appointed Colonel of 10th Regiment of Foot in 1781 and a Lieutenant-General the following year. He came home in 1788 and was made a Privy Councillor in 1789, but then returned to Vienna, where his final duties included attending the Congress of Sistovo, which ended the Turkish war.

He was elected a Fellow of the Royal Society of Edinburgh in 1786. His proposers were James Gregory, William Miller and Robert Arbuthnot of Haddo.

Keith's daughter, writer Amelia Gillespie Smyth, was born in Vienna in 1788.

He retired in 1792 and settled in Hammersmith, where he died suddenly three years later.

Parliament of Great Britain
Preceded by Adam Hay	Member of Parliament for Peeblesshire; 1775–1780	Succeeded by Alexander Murray
Diplomatic posts
Preceded by Philip Stanhope	British Minister to Saxony; 1767–1771	Succeeded by John Osborne
Preceded by Robert Gunning	British Envoy to Denmark; 1771–1772	Succeeded by Ralph Woodford
Preceded by The Viscount Stormont	British Envoy to Austria; 1772–1792	Succeeded by The Earl of Elgin
Military offices
Preceded by Edward Sandford	Colonel of the 10th (the North Lincolnshire) Regiment of Foot; 1781–1795	Succeeded by Hon. Henry Edward Fox
