= Robert Gordon (ambassador) =

British ambassador

Robert Anthony Eagleson Gordon CMG OBE (born 9 February 1952) is a former British Ambassador to Burma (1995 - 1999) and Vietnam (2003 - 2007).

Gordon was educated at The King's School, Canterbury and Magdalen College, Oxford. He joined Her Majesty's Diplomatic Service in 1973. He served in Warsaw, Santiago and Paris before his ambassadors' appointments.
