= Rob Tinline =

British High Commissioner to Canada

His Excellency Rob Tinline

British High Commissioner to Canada
- Incumbent
- Assumed office February 2025
- Monarch: Charles III
- Prime Minister: Keir Starmer
- Preceded by: David Prodger (Chargé d’Affaires)

Robert Tinline is a British civil servant in His Majesty's Diplomatic Service. He has served as the High Commissioner to Canada since February 2025.

== Career ==
Tinline joined the Foreign and Commonwealth Office in 1997.

Tinline served as Deputy chief of mission of the British delegation to the European Union from 2012 to 2015 and served as Director of the Foreign, Commonwealth and Development Office for the Americas since 2022.

In an interview with Playbook Canada, Tinline reaffirmed his support for a strong Canada-US relationship.

== Personal life ==
In 2008, Tinline married Victoria Billing, a fellow diplomat.
