= Simon Clement =

Simon Clement (c. 1654 – c. 1730) was an English merchant, diplomat and writer on economics.

== Life ==
Clement spent his early career as a stockjobber and merchant. He served in Vienna as secretary to the Earl of Peterborough on his embassy to the Emperor from 1711–12, later acting as Peterborough’s chargé d'affaires in Vienna from April 1711 until late 1714.

What little is known of Clement’s life comes from the British Library’s collection of a series of letters saved by Robert Harley, Earl of Oxford. From the letters we learn that in 1712 Clement was almost 60 years old, that he had a son Daniel in London who attended Oxford University, and that he was married to Mary Hollister. Mary’s niece was Hannah Callowhill, who became William Penn’s second wife in 1696. Through Penn, Clement achieved some influence with Harley.

== Views on economics ==
Clement’s writings concerned exchange and specialization, paper money, inflation, the money multiplier, scarcity of coins, and international trade. In A Discourse of the General Notions of Money, Trade, and Exchanges (1695), Clement explained the advantages of trade and specialization, and the importance of metallic money in facilitating trade. He advocated restricting imports as a means of preventing the export of bullion, and favored recoinage of worn British coins, while opposing devaluation of the coins. In A Dialogue Between a Countrey Gentleman and a Merchant Concerning the Falling of Guinea’s (1696), Clement argued against raising the value of Guineas, on the grounds that this would under-value silver and create arbitrage opportunities for currency traders, to the detriment of the nation. In Remarks Upon a late Ingenious Pamphlet (1718), Clement claimed that an unprecedented scarcity of silver had been caused by excessive British imports from India, a problem that would not be remedied "whilst people have the Vanity to give more for a tawdry Callicoe, than for a good silk of our own making." The true remedy, he claimed, was for consumers to restrain their consumption of Indian goods. He also argued against "the absurd Opinion, that the Raising our Coin would advance its Value, and prevent its being carried out of the Nation".

Clement’s most influential work was Faults on Both Sides (1710). This was a wide-ranging pamphlet that briefly discussed paper money and the influence of credit on trade. The pamphlet (widely attributed to Harley) produced several replies, which Clement answered in A Vindication of the Faults on Both Sides (1710). In it he dismissed what modern economists call the money multiplier, on the grounds that all bank-issued money is backed, either by the "valuable and sufficient security" offered as collateral by the borrower, or by the "proper stock" of the banker himself. Thus a banker need only take care to issue money to borrowers who offer sufficiently valuable collateral, and the value of the bank’s money will be preserved regardless of the quantity issued. This idea is the basis for what later became known as the real bills doctrine, and Clement was one of the earliest defenders of that doctrine. As recently as 1945 Clement’s exposition of real bills principles was attacked by Lloyd Mints, who incorrectly attributed Clement’s writings to "Richard" Harley.

It is noteworthy that Clement’s exposition of the real bills doctrine required only that money be issued in exchange for sufficiently valuable collateral, and not necessarily to finance "productive" activity. Thus he avoided the errors of later writers, including Adam Smith, who thought that a policy of only issuing money for "real bills" would prevent inflation by making the quantity of money move in step with real output.

== Bibliography ==
- A Discourse of the General Notions of Money, Trade, and Exchanges (London, 1695)
- A Dialogue Between a Countrey Gentleman and a Merchant, Concerning the Falling of Guinea’s (Cornhill, 1696)
- The Interest of England, as it Stands, with Relation to the Trade of Ireland (London, 1698)
- A Vindication of the Bank of England (London, 1707)
- Faults on Both Sides (London, 1710)
- A Vindication of the Faults on Both Sides (London, 1710)
- Remarks Upon a Late Ingenious Pamphlet (London, 1718)
