= List of ambassadors of the United Kingdom to Austria =

The ambassador of the United Kingdom to Austria is the United Kingdom's foremost diplomatic representative in the Republic of Austria, and head of the UK's diplomatic mission in Vienna. The official title is His Britannic Majesty's Ambassador to the Republic of Austria.

For the ambassadors from the Court of St James's up to 1707, see the list of ambassadors of the Kingdom of England to the Holy Roman Emperor and for the period 1707 to 1800, see the list of ambassadors of Great Britain to the Holy Roman Emperor.

Since 2006 the ambassador to Austria has also been the permanent representative to the United Nations and other international organisations in Vienna including the IAEA. Before 2006, this was a separate post.

== List of heads of mission ==
=== Envoys extraordinary and ministers plenipotentiary at the Court of Vienna ===
- 1799–1801: Gilbert, Lord Minto
- 1801–1806: Sir Arthur Paget
  - 1805: The Earl of Harrington (Extraordinary Mission)
- 1806–1807: Robert Adair

=== Plenipotentiaries at the Court of Vienna ===
- 1807: George Herbert, 11th Earl of Pembroke
- 1807–1813: no ambassador due to Napoleonic Wars
  - 1809: Benjamin Bathurst (Extraordinary Mission)
- 1813–1814: George Hamilton-Gordon, 4th Earl of Aberdeen

=== Ambassadors extraordinary and plenipotentiary to the Emperor of Austria ===
- 1814–1823: Lord Stewart
- 1823–1831: Sir Henry Wellesley
- 1831–1841: Sir Frederick Lamb
- 1841–1846: Sir Robert Gordon
- 1846–1850: John Ponsonby, 1st Viscount Ponsonby

=== Envoys extraordinary and ministers plenipotentiary to the Emperor of Austria ===
- 1851–1855: John Fane, 11th Earl of Westmorland
- 1855–1858: Sir George Hamilton Seymour
- 1858–1860: Lord Augustus Loftus

=== Ambassadors extraordinary and plenipotentiary to the Emperor of Austria ===
- 1860–1867: John Bloomfield, 2nd Baron Bloomfield

=== Ambassadors to Austria-Hungary ===
- 1867–1871: John Bloomfield, 2nd Baron Bloomfield
- 1871–1877: Sir Andrew Buchanan
- 1877–1884: Sir Henry Elliot
- 1884–1893: Sir Augustus Paget
- 1893–1896: Sir Edmund Monson
- 1896–1900: Sir Horace Rumbold, Bt.
- 1900–1905: Sir Francis Plunkett
- 1905–1908: Sir Edward Goschen
- 1908–1913: Sir Fairfax Cartwright
- 1913–1914: Sir Maurice de Bunsen
- 1914–1919: no representation due to First World War

=== High commissioners to Austria ===
- 1919–1920: Sir Francis Lindley

=== Envoys Extraordinary and Ministers Plenipotentiary to Austria ===
- 1920–1921: Sir Francis Lindley
- 1921–1928: Aretas Akers-Douglas, 2nd Viscount Chilston
- 1928–1933: Sir Eric Phipps
- 1933–1937: Sir Walford Selby
- 1937–1938: Michael Palairet
- 1938–1945: no representation due to Anschluss and Second World War

=== Political representatives in Austria ===
- 1945–1947: Sir Henry Mack

=== Ambassadors to Austria ===
- 1946–1948: Sir Henry Mack
- 1948–1949: Sir Bertrand Jerram
- 1949–1954: Sir Harold Caccia
- 1954–1958: Sir Geoffrey Wallinger
- 1958–1961: Sir James Bowker
- 1961–1965: Sir Malcolm Henderson
- 1965–1967: Sir John Pilcher
- 1967–1970: Sir Anthony Rumbold, Bt.
- 1970–1972: Sir Peter Wilkinson
- 1972–1976: Sir Denis Laskey
- 1976–1979: Hugh Travers Morgan
- 1979–1982: Donald Gordon
- 1982–1986: Michael Alexander
- 1986–1989: Robert O'Neill
- 1989–1992: Brian Crowe
- 1992–1996: Terence Wood
- 1996–2000: Sir Anthony Figgis
- 2000–2003: Antony Ford
- 2003–2007: John Macgregor
- 2007–2012: Simon Smith
- 2012–2016: Susan le Jeune d'Allegeershecque
- 2016–2021: Leigh Turner
- 2021–present: Lindsay Skoll

== See also ==
- Austria–United Kingdom relations
- List of ambassadors of Austria to the United Kingdom
