= William Locke (painter) =

British artist

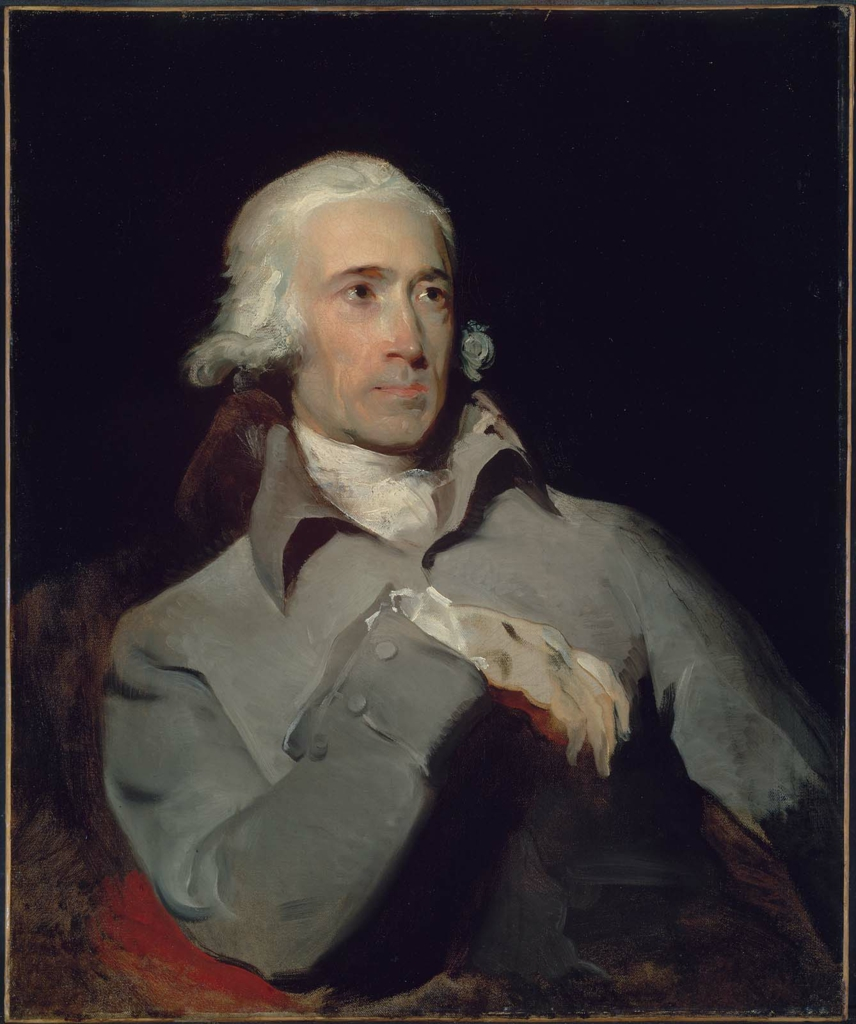
- Locke by Thomas Lawrence
- Born: 1732
- Died: 5 October 1810 (aged 77–78)
- Occupation: Artist

William Locke (1732 – 5 October 1810) was a British artist.

== Biography ==
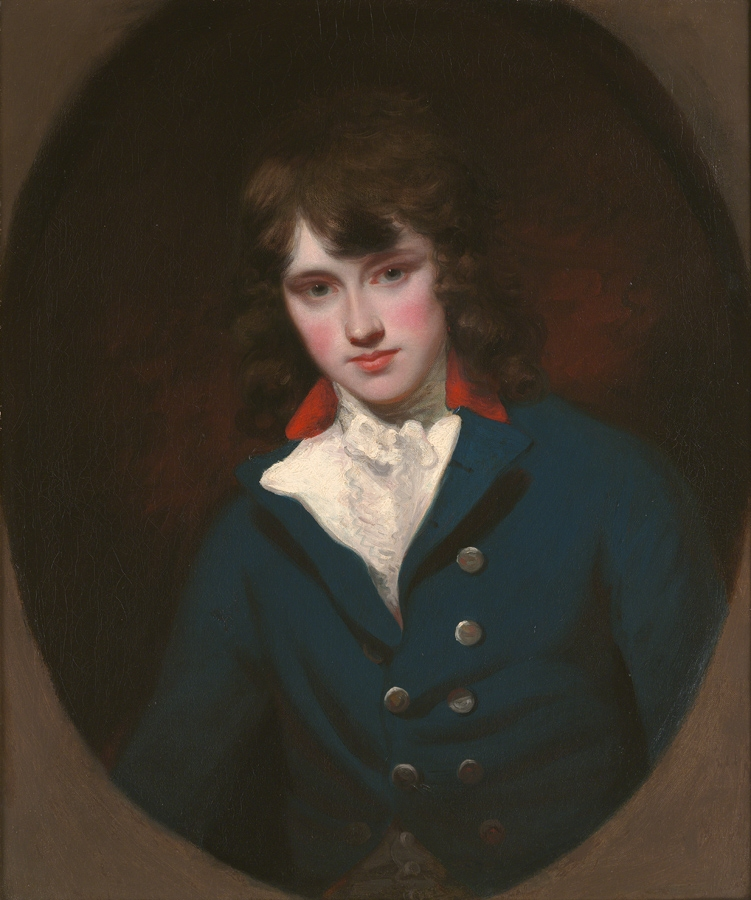
Locke the Younger by John Hoppner

Locke was an art amateur. He was born in 1732 and belonged to a family which claimed connection with that of John Locke the philosopher. Locke was well known as a wealthy amateur of his day, and formed a collection of works of art at Rome, which included the picture of 'St. Ursula' by Claude, now in the National Gallery, and among other antique marbles the 'Discobolos,' afterwards at Duncombe Park, and the torso of Venus, which, was in the Duke of Richmond's collection, and after injury by fire came to the British Museum. In 1774 he purchased an estate at Norbury, near Mickleham in Surrey, where he built a house, one of the rooms in which was decorated with paintings by G. Barret, Cipriani, and other artists. Locke and his wife were well known in the society of their day, and Frances Burney was one of their closest friends. When the French refugees, Mme. de Stael and others, settled at Juniper Hall, near Norbury, they were very intimate with the Lockes, who materially assisted the marriage of M. d'Arblay and Miss Burney. When the latter built 'Camilla Cottage,' it was on a piece of ground given them by the Lockes. Locke died at Norbury on 5 October 1810, aged 78, and was buried at Mickleham. By his wife, Frederica Augusta, he left among other children two sons, William (see below) and George, and a daughter Amelia, married to John Angerstein, M.P., of Weeting, Norfolk.

Locke, William, the younger (1767–1847), amateur artist, elder son of the above, born in 1767, distinguished himself in early days as a promising artist. He was a pupil and friend of Henry Fuseli, who dedicated his lectures on painting to him. Locke painted several historical and allegorical subjects in a strained and affected style; one, 'The Last Moments of Cardinal Wolsey,' was engraved in stipple by Charles Knight. There are some etchings and drawings by him in the print room at the British Museum. Locke sold Norbury in June 1819, and lived afterwards principally at Rome and Paris. He married Miss Jennings, daughter of Mr. Jennings-Noel, a lady noted for her beauty, and died in 1847, leaving one son, William (see below), and a daughter Elizabeth, who married Joseph, thirteenth Lord Wallscourt. He was buried at Mickleham.

Locke, William, the third (1804–1832), captain in the lifeguards and amateur artist, was remarkable for his personal beauty and for his skill as an amateur artist. He published some illustrations to Byron's works. He was drowned in the lake of Como on 15 September 1832. Locke married Selina, daughter of Admiral Tollemache. A daughter, Augusta Selina, was born posthumously. She married successively Ernest, Lord Burghersh, the Duca di San Teodoro, and Thomas de Grey, the present Lord Walsingham.
