= 1979 Birthday Honours =

British government recognitions

The Queen's Birthday Honours 1979 were appointments in many of the Commonwealth realms of Queen Elizabeth II to various orders and honours to reward and highlight good works by citizens of those countries. The appointments were made to celebrate the official birthday of the Queen. They were published for the United Kingdom in two tranches, first on 15 June 1979 and second on 25 June 1979. Other countries' lists were published on 15 June 1979: Australia, New Zealand, Barbados, Mauritius, Fiji, Bahamas, Papua New Guinea, Solomon Islands, Tuvalu, and Saint Lucia.

The recipients of honours are displayed here as they were styled before their new honour, and arranged by honour, with classes (Knight, Knight Grand Cross, etc.) and then divisions (Military, Civil, etc.) as appropriate.

== United Kingdom and Colonies ==
=== Life Peers ===
==== Baroness ====
- The Right Honourable Betty Harvie Anderson, OBE TD (Margaret Betty, Mrs. Skrimshire), lately Member of Parliament for the East Division of Renfrewshire. Deputy Chairman of Ways and Means, House of Commons, 1970–73.
- Jean Kennedy McFarlane, Professor and Head of Department of Nursing, University of Manchester.
- Diana Josceline Barbara, Mrs Neave, Widow of Airey Middleton Sheffield Neave, DSO OBE MC TD.

==== Baron ====
- The Right Honourable John Emerson Harding Davies, MBE. Formerly Member of Parliament for the Knutsford Division of Cheshire. Secretary of State for Trade and Industry 1970–72; Chancellor of the Duchy of Lancaster 1972–74.
- The Right Honourable Joseph Bradshaw Godber, lately Member of Parliament for the Grantham Division of Lincolnshire. Minister of Agriculture, Fisheries and Food, 1972–74.
- Ralph Harris, General Director, The Institute of Economic Affairs.
- Hugh Emlyn Hooson, QC, lately Member of Parliament for Montgomeryshire. Lately Leader of the Welsh Liberal Party.
- The Right Honourable Sir Robert Lynd Erskine Lowry, Lord Chief Justice of Northern Ireland.
- The Right Honourable James Peter Hymers Mackay, QC, Lord Advocate.
- The Right Honourable Henry Oscar Murton, OBE TD, lately Member of Parliament for Poole. Lately Chairman of Ways and Means, House of Commons.
- The Right Honourable Sir David Lockhart-Mure Renton, KBE TD QC, lately Member of Parliament for Huntingdonshire.
- Hugh Redwald Trevor-Roper, Regius Professor of Modern History, University of Oxford.
- The Right Honourable James David Gibson-Watt, MC Formerly Member of Parliament for Hereford.
- The Right Honourable Richard Frederick Wood, lately Member of Parliament for the Bridlington Division of Yorkshire. Minister of Overseas Development, 1970–74.

=== Privy Counsellor ===
- Terence Langley Higgins, MP, Member of Parliament for Worthing.

=== Knight Bachelor ===
- Professor Geoffrey Allen, Chairman Science Research Council.
- Reginald Frederick Brittain Bennett, VRD, lately Member of Parliament for Fareham.
- James Clark Cameron, CBE TD, Chairman of the Council, British Medical Association. For Services to Medicine.
- Robert Gordon Cooke, lately Member of Parliament for the West Division of Bristol.
- Horace Walter Cutler, OBE, Leader, Greater London Council.
- Alfred George Fletcher Hall-Davis, lately Member of Parliament for the Morecambe and Lonsdale Division of Lancashire.
- Eric William Driver, Chairman, Mersey Regional Health Authority.
- Michael Owen Edwardes, Chairman, British Leyland.
- Stuart Newton Hampshire, Philosopher.
- Gordon Ivan Hobday, Chairman, Boots Company Ltd.
- Maurice Arthur Eric Hodgson, Chairman, Imperial Chemical Industries Ltd. For services to Export.
- Robert Frederick Hunt, CBE, Chairman and Chief Executive, Dowty Group Ltd. For services to Export.
- Alexander Anthony Jarratt, CB, Chairman and Chief Executive, Reed International Ltd. For services to Export.
- Geoffrey Alan Jellicoe, CBE. For services to Landscape Architecture.
- Hugh Ferguson Jones, OBE. For public services in South Wales. (Died)
- Henry Charles Kerruish, OBE, Speaker of the House of Keys.
- Basil John Mason, CB, Director-General, Meteorological Office.
- Jasper More, lately Member of Parliament for the Ludlow Division of Shropshire.
- James William Spencer Mount, CBE BEM. For services to the horticultural industry.
- Noel Henry Moynihan, Chairman, The Save the Children Fund.
- John Henry Orr, OBE QPM, Chief Constable, Lothian and Borders Police.
- John Chance Palmer, President of the Law Society.
- Professor David Chilton Phillips, Biological Secretary, The Royal Society.
- Roy Shaw, Secretary-General, Arts Council of Great Britain.
- Ronald Oliver Carless Swayne, MC, Chairman, Overseas Containers Ltd.
- John Tooley, General Administrator, Royal Opera House, Covent Garden.
- Peter Edward Trench, CBE TD, Chairman, Construction and Housing Research Advisory Council.
- Anthony Favill Tuke, Chairman, Barclays Bank Ltd.
- Gervas George Walker, Chairman, Avon County Council.
- John Robin Plowman, CBE. For public services in Bermuda.

Australian States

State of Victoria

- Jack Stuart Brockhoff, of Sandringham. For distinguished community service.
- Wilfred Deakin Brookes, CBE DSO, of Toorak. For distinguished service to commerce and industry.

State of Queensland

- Justin Hickey, of St Lucia. For distinguished service to the business community and people of Queensland.
- Ernest Walter Savage, of Jindalee. For outstanding services to the accountancy profession in Australia and to community interests and business enterprises in Queensland.

State of Western Australia

- Emeritus Professor Noel Stanley Bayliss, CBE, of Nedlands. For his services to tertiary education and in the establishment of Murdoch University.
- Marcus Truby Beeck, of Katanning. For his role in the agricultural life of the State.

=== Order of the Bath ===
==== Knight Grand Cross of the Order of the Bath (GCB) ====
Military Division

Royal Navy

- General Sir Peter Whiteley, KCB OBE, Royal Marines.

Army

- General Sir Patrick Howard-Dobson, KCB ADC Gen, (189025), late the Queen's Own Hussars. Colonel Commandant, Army Catering Corps.

Royal Air Force

- Air Chief Marshal Sir David Evans, KCB CBE.

Civil Division

- Sir Frank Cooper, KCB CMG, Permanent Under-Secretary of State, Ministry of Defence.

==== Knight Commander of the Order of the Bath (KCB) ====
Military Division

Royal Navy

- Vice Admiral David Anning Loram, MVO.
- Vice Admiral Cameron Rusby, MVO.

Army

- Lieutenant General George Leslie Conroy Cooper, MC, (357063), late Corps of Royal Engineers.

Royal Air Force

- Air Marshal Philip Jacobus Lagesen, CB DFC AFC.

Civil Division

- Kenneth Edward Couzens, CB, Second Permanent Secretary, H.M. Treasury.
- William Kerr Fraser, CB, Permanent Under-Secretary of State, Scottish Office.
- Douglas Arthur Lovelock, CB, Chairman, Board of Customs and Excise.
- Geoffrey Charles Wardale, CB, Second Permanent Secretary, Department of the Environment.

==== Companion of the Order of the Bath (CB) ====
Military Division

Royal Navy

- Rear Admiral David William Haslam, OBE.
- Commandant Sarah Vonla Adair McBride, Hon. ADC, Women's Royal Naval Service.
- Rear Admiral Philip Reginald Marrack.
- The Venerable Archdeacon Basil Arthur O'Ferrall, QHC.

Army

- Major General Michael Callan (400816), late Royal Army Ordnance Corps.
- Major General Samuel Knox Lecky, OBE, (370164), late Corps of Royal Electrical and Mechanical Engineers. Honorary Colonel, Queen's University (Belfast) Officers Training Corps.
- Brigadier Joan Olivia Elsie Moriarty, RRC QHNS, (378906), Queen Alexandra's Royal Army Nursing Corps.
- Major General The O'Morchoe, MBE, (393236). Colonel, The Royal Irish Rangers (27th (Inniskilling), 83rd and 87th).
- Major General Geoffrey Boyd Wilson (373937), late Royal Regiment of Artillery.
- Major General Henry Gabriel Woods, MBE MC, (312522), late 5th Royal Inniskilling Dragoon Guards.

Royal Air Force

- Air Vice-Marshal Dudley Graham Bailey, CBE.
- Air Vice-Marshal Paul Richard Mallorie, AFC.
- Air Vice-Marshal Arnold Alec Morris.
- Air Vice-Marshal John Edward Smith, CBE AFC.

Civil Division

- John Arthur Allen, MBE, Principal Director, Ministry of Defence.
- Kenneth Thomas Barnett, Deputy Secretary, Department of the Environment.
- John Bertram Hardy Billam, DFC, Legal Adviser, Department of Employment.
- Anthony Addison Birley, Clerk of Public Bills, House of Commons.
- George Dutton Gibb, Chief Dental Officer, Department of Health and Social Security.
- Frank Appleby Harper, MBE, Under-Secretary, Department of Education and Science.
- Albert Blair Harrington, lately Medical Adviser, Civil Service Department.
- George Dennis Holmes, Director-General and Deputy Chairman, Forestry Commission.
- Anthony John Lippitt, Deputy Secretary, Department of Industry.
- William Burton Housley Lord, lately Director, Royal Armament Research and Development Establishment, Ministry of Defence.
- James Victor Morrison, TD, lately Deputy Secretary, Northern Ireland Civil Service.
- Karl Max Newman, Under-Secretary, Lord Chancellor's Department.
- Arthur Alan Pritchard, Deputy Secretary, Ministry of Defence.
- Robert Edwin Radford, Deputy Secretary, Department of Health and Social Security.
- John Roderic Steele, Deputy Secretary, Department of Trade.
- Bernard Maurice Thimont, Controller, H.M. Stationery Office.
- Eric Vickers, Under-Secretary, Department of the Environment.
- Malcolm Widdup, Under-Secretary, H.M. Treasury.

Australian States

State of Victoria

- Ronald Geoffrey Downes, of Eaglemont. For public service to the State of Victoria.

=== Order of Saint Michael and Saint George ===
==== Knight Grand Cross of the Order of St Michael and St George (GCMG) ====
Diplomatic Service and Overseas List

- Sir Alan Campbell, KCMG, HM Ambassador, Rome.
- Sir John Killick, KCMG, United Kingdom Permanent Representative on the North Atlantic Council.

==== Knight Commander of the Order of St Michael and St George (KCMG) ====
Diplomatic Service and Overseas List

- Ronald Arculus, CMG, HM Ambassador (designate), Rome.
- John Alexander Noble Graham, CMG, HM Ambassador, Tehran.
- John Lang Taylor, CMG, HM Ambassador, Caracas.

==== Companion of the Order of St Michael and St George (CMG) ====
- Sidney Abramson, Under-Secretary, Department of Trade.
- David Bleackley, Assistant Director, Overseas Division, Institute of Geological Sciences.

Diplomatic Service and Overseas List

- Douglas William Alfred Blye, OBE, Secretary for Monetary Affairs, Hong Kong.
- Hugh Campbell Byatt, H.M. Ambassador, Luanda.
- Arthur David Saunders Goodall, Minister, H.M. Embassy, Bonn.
- Keith Hamylton-Jones, lately H.M. Ambassador, San José.
- Francis Robert MacGinnis, Minister and Deputy Commandant, British Military Government, Berlin.
- James Mellon, British High Commissioner, Accra.
- Henry David Alastair Capel Miers, Counsellor and Head of Chancery, H.M. Embassy, Tehran.
- John William Nicholas, British Consul-General, Melbourne.
- Gerald Victor Summerhayes, OBE, Permanent Secretary, Cabinet Office, Sokoto State, Nigeria.
- Ieremia Tienang Tabai. For public services in the Gilbert Islands.
- Benjamin Thorne, MBE, lately Counsellor (Commercial), H.M. Embassy, Tokyo.
- Robert Lucian Wade-Gery, lately Minister, H.M. Embassy, Moscow.
- Harold Berners Walker, H.M. Ambassador, Bahrain.
- William Erskine Hamilton Whyte, Foreign and Commonwealth Office.
- Christopher Matthew Woods, MC, Foreign and Commonwealth Office.

Australian States

State of New South Wales

- The Honourable Mr Justice Athol Randolf Moffitt, QC, President of the Court of Appeal.

State of Victoria

- Peter Bruce Ronald, of Pakenham. For service to the Royal Agricultural Society of Victoria and the community.
- Commander Richard Stanley Veale, VRD, Royal Australian Naval Reserve (Retired), of Elwood. For service to the Royal Life Saving Society.

State of Queensland

- Kevin John Joseph King, of Hamilton. For community services, particularly to the Queensland Fire Services.

State of Western Australia

- Phillip Rennell Adams, QC, of Peppermint Grove. For services to the legal profession and in public service.
- Bernard Francis Prindiville, of South Perth. For services to commerce and the community.

=== Royal Victorian Order ===
==== Dame Commander of the Royal Victorian Order (DCVO) ====
- The Right Honourable Ruth Sylvia, Dowager Baroness Fermoy, CVO OBE.

==== Knight Commander of the Royal Victorian Order (KCVO) ====
- Stephen James Hamilton Miller.
- James Wilfred Stubbs, TD.
- The Very Reverend Martin Gloster Sullivan.

==== Commander of the Royal Victorian Order (CVO) ====
- Kenneth Gait Adams.
- Lieutenant Colonel John Chandos-Pole, OBE,
- Julian St John Loyd, MVO.
- Charles MacGregor, MBE.
- Colonel William George McHardy, MVO MBE MC.
- The Reverend Arthur Morton, OBE.
- Kenneth Ronald Stowe, CB.

==== Member of the Royal Victorian Order, 4th class (MVO) ====
- Anne Ainscough, MVO.
- The Reverend Canon Alan Glendining.
- The Reverend Anthony Hall Harrison Harbottle.
- Thomas Alfred Joy.
- Commander John Andrew Marshall, Royal Navy.
- The Reverend Thomas James Trail Nicol, MBE MC.
- William Richard Michael Oswald.
- Colonel Gordon Russell Simpson, DSO TD.

==== Member of the Royal Victorian Order, 5th class (MVO) ====
- Ann Christine Bailey.
- William Richard Grout.
- Lieutenant Commander (S) (OCA) David John Howlett, Royal Navy.
- Isabelle Mary Melton.
- Major William Lancelot Arthur Nash, MBE.
- Major Willie Shipley Phelps, MBE.
- Arthur George Rawles.
- Robert Ashley Skute Stephenson.
- Major Walter Louvin Thompson, MBE DCM.

=== Order of the British Empire ===
==== Knight Grand Cross of the Order of the British Empire (GBE) ====
Civil Division

Diplomatic Service and Overseas List

- Sir Yuet-Keung Kan, CBE. For public services in Hong Kong.

==== Dame Commander of the Order of the British Empire (DBE) ====
Civil Division

- Margaret Kate Weston, Director, Science Museum, Department of Education and Science.

Australian States

State of Victoria

- Marie Freda Breen, OBE, of Brighton. For distinguished community service.

==== Knight Commander of the Order of the British Empire (KBE) ====
Military Division

Royal Navy

- Vice Admiral John Stuart Crosbie Lea.
- Rear Admiral Oswald Nigel Amherst Cecil, CB.

Royal Air Force

- Acting Air Marshal Roy David Austen-Smith, CB DFC.

Civil Division

- Hedley Bernard Greenborough, C.B.E., President, Confederation of British Industry.
- Reginald Sydney Murley, TD, President, Royal College of Surgeons of England.

Diplomatic Service and Overseas List

- Albert Thomas Lamb, CMG MBE DFC, HM Ambassador, Oslo.
- Vincent Gordon Lindsay White. For services to British commercial and community interests in the United States.

Australian States

State of Victoria

- Donald Henry Trescowthick, of Toorak. For distinguished community service.

==== Commander of the Order of the British Empire (CBE) ====
Military Division

Royal Navy

- Captain Christopher Thomas Codrington.
- Captain John Ditchburn, Royal Fleet Auxiliary Service.
- Captain Wilbert Anderson Tofts, AFC.
- The Right Reverend Francis Joseph Walmsley, Bishop-in-Ordinary to HM Forces, lately Principal Roman Catholic Chaplain (Naval).

Army

- Brigadier Roger Harvey Freeman, OBE, (380723), late Royal Army Medical Corps.
- Brigadier Brian Leslie Graham Kenny (437098), late The Queen's Royal Irish Hussars.
- Colonel Leo Francis Macey (359009), late Royal Army Pay Corps.
- Brigadier Michael John Short, ADC, (343040), late Royal Army Ordnance Corps.
- Brigadier John Roger Spurry (415908), late Royal Army Veterinary Corps (now R.A.R.O.).
- Brigadier (now Acting Major General) John Peter Barry Condliffe Watts, OBE MC, (415012), late The Royal Irish Rangers (27th (Inniskilling), 83rd and 87th).
- Brigadier Robert Wheatley, OBE, (403972), late Corps of Royal Engineers.

Royal Air Force

- Air Commodore Frederick David Gibson Clark, OBE.
- Air Commodore Kenneth John Hitchcock.
- Air Commodore Kenneth Robert Willy.
- Group Captain Duncan Allison.
- Group Captain John Walter Price, OBE.

Civil Division

- Lionel Philips Altman, Member of Council and Past President, Motor Agents Association.
- James Fraser Gillan Anderson, Regional Convenor, Central Regional Council, Scotland.
- Michael Cuthbert George Andrews, General Secretary, The Arthritis and Rheumatism Council for Research.
- Peter Clifton Aspinall, Managing Director, Chloride International, Ltd.
- John Melbourn Aubrey, General Manager, Courtaulds Ltd.
- Peter Eric Axon, O.B.E, Chairman, Pumps and Valves Working Party.
- Stephen Charles Clavell Bate, lately Chief Scientific Officer, Department of the Environment.
- Charles Edward Beauchamp, Deputy Board Member for Finance and Planning, Post Office.
- Donald Alfred Bennett, Chairman, International Synthetic Rubber Company Ltd. For services to Export.
- Robert Langley Page Berry, Director, National Anti-Waste Programme.
- Richard Evelyn Donohue Bishop, Kennedy Professor of Mechanical Engineering, University College, University of London.
- Frederick Peter Boyce, Chief Executive, Hertfordshire County Council.
- Christopher Richard Sandford Buckle, Writer, Critic and Designer.
- Frank Dudley Bushell, T.D, Chairman Housing and Environmental Health Committee, Association of District Councils.
- Herbert Sidney Elliott Catherwood, Chairman Ulsterbus Ltd. and Citybus Ltd.
- Richard Christopher, Secretary, Joint Matriculation Board.
- Ian Robertson Clark, Board Member, British National Oil Corporation.
- Frederick Ernest Cleary, M.B.E., Chairman Metropolitan Public Gardens Association.
- Alfred Henry Coburn, Managing Director, Findus Ltd.
- Patrick Victor Cotter, Assistant Secretary, Ministry of Defence.
- Michael James Cotton, Deputy Chairman and Chief Executive, International Military Services Ltd.
- John Francis Crittall, For Public Services in Essex.
- John Stanley Cross, Chairman, Eastern Counties Farmers Ltd.
- John McCandlish Murdoch Cunningham, Director, Hill Farming Research Organisation.
- William John Dalziel, Deputy Chief Executive, Plessey Company Ltd. For services to Export.
- Kenneth Davis, O.B.E., General Manager, Dover Harbour Board.
- Stephen Martin De Bartolome, Chairman, Spear & Jackson International Ltd.
- Diarmuid Downs, Chairman and Managing Director, Ricardo Consulting Engineers Ltd.
- James Paris Duguid, Professor of Bacteriology, University of Dundee.
- Stanley Malcolm Duncan, Chairman, Dental Rates Study Group.
- Frederick Dalby Flower, M.B.E., lately Principal, Kingsway Princeton College.
- John Denny Fryer, Director, Weed Research Organisation, Agricultural Research Council.
- Douglas Fleming Hardie, Managing Director, Edward Parker and Company Ltd, Dundee.
- John Arthur Jones Harries. For public services in Wales.
- Norman Harris, Chairman, Planning, Highways and Transportation Committee, Association of District Councils.
- Douglas Hamilton Harrison. For services to Rugby Football.
- James Arthur Hartnett, Chairman, Eurotherm International Ltd. For services to Export.
- Colonel Roderick Travers Hawes, T.D, lately Chairman, Royal Humane Society.
- Robert Brumwel Henderson, Managing Director, Ulster Television Ltd.
- William Robert Henry, Chairman, Coats Patons Ltd, Glasgow.
- Joseph Max Hirsh, lately Director of Architecture and Planning, Westminster City Council.
- Gilbert Denis Hitchcock, Chairman, Bedfordshire Area Health Authority.
- John Ray Horrell, T.D., lately Chairman, Cambridgeshire County Council. For services to Education.
- Miss Jean Horsham, Assistant Secretary, Office of the Parliamentary Commissioner for Administration.
- Raymond Illsley, Professor of Medical Sociology, University of Aberdeen.
- Douglas John Insole. For services to Cricket.
- Anthony Trafford James, Head of Division of Biosciences, Unilever Research Laboratory.
- Anthony Tom Brett-Jones. For services to quantity surveying.
- Oswald Arthur Kelting, lately Chairman, Basildon New Town Development Corporation.
- Frederick Douglas Kennedy, Assistant Solicitor, Department of Health and Social Security.
- Professor Robert Kilpatrick, Chairman, Advisory Committee on Pesticides.
- Arthur James Lee, D.S.C., Director, Fisheries Research, Ministry of Agriculture, Fisheries and Food.
- John Maurice Lindsay, T.D., Director, The Scottish Civic Trust.
- Glyn Lloyd. For services to health and safety in the building industry.
- Colonel Herbert Gerard Thomas McClellan, O.B.E, T.D., lately Chairman North West of England and the Isle of Man Auxiliary and Volunteer Reserve Association.
- The Reverend Donald Farquhar Macleod Macdonald, Principal Clerk, General Assembly of the Church of Scotland.
- Ian Murray McKellen. Actor.
- Neville Marriner. For Services to the Academy of St Martin in the Fields.
- Wallace Monaghan, Chairman, Fine Fare (Holdings) Ltd.
- Stuart Angus Morrison, Professor Pianforte, Royal College of Music.
- Gregory George Sidney Mott, Managing Director, Vickers Shipbuilding Group, Ltd.
- C. H. Mullan, V.R.D,. lately Resident Magistrate, Northern Ireland.
- Catherine Theresa, Mrs Nealon, Chairman, Lothian Health Board.
- Joslyn Gray Owen, Chief Education Officer, Devon.
- Barry Newton Pain, Q.P.M., Chief Constable, Kent Constabulary.
- Kenneth Jamieson Peters, Managing Director, Aberdeen Journals, Ltd.
- John Phillips, Chairman, Distributive Industry Training Board.
- Miss Ruth Pitter. Poetess.
- Willam Johnson Prior, Member, Electricity Council.
- Stanley Race, Director, Redfearn National Glass Ltd.
- Hedley James Gordon Richards, Chief Inspector of Immigration, Home Office.
- Kenneth Frederick Roberts, Chief Executive, Wessex Water Authority.
- James Spalding Robertson, Assistant Secretary, Scottish Office.
- Eliot Joseph Ben Rose, Trustee Runnymede Trust.
- Alan Routledge, Foreign and Commonwealth Office.
- John Kenneth Sinclair St Joseph, O.B.E., Professor of Aerial Photographic Studies, University of Cambridge.
- Anthony Henry Sansome, Managing Director, Metropolitan Cammell Ltd. For services to Export.
- Alexander Bruce Scott, V.R.D., Regional Controller, Board of Inland Revenue.
- Alexander Shapiro, lately Psychiatrist. For services to the Mentally Handicapped.
- John Dodson Shepherd, Regional Administrator, Yorkshire Regional Health Authority.
- James Henry Slater, General Secretary, National Union of Seamen,
- Walter Somerville, Physician, Department of Cardiology, Middlesex Hospital.
- Robert Emil Steiner, Professor of Diagnostic Radiology, Royal Postgraduate Medical School.
- Leonard James Taylor, M.V.O., Assistant Secretary, H.M. Treasury.
- Frank Thistlethwaite, Vice-Chancellor, University of East Anglia,
- Christopher Wilson Thomas, Chairman, Avon Health Authority.
- Lady Freda Valentine. For service to the Guide Dogs for the Blind Association.
- Malcolm George Wilcox, M.B.E., lately President, Institute of Bankers.
- Andrew Wood Wilkinson, Nuffield Professor of Paediatric Surgery, Institute of Child Health, University of London.
- Nigel Ignace Bond-Williams, lately Member, Price Commission.
- George Charles Edward Wilson, Member, City of Sheffield Metropolitan District.
- John Spark Wilson, O.B.E., Assistant Commissioner, Metropolitan Police.
- Michael John Wise, M.C., Professor of Geography, London School of Economics and Political Science, University of London.
- George Soomerville Wishart, Assistant Secretary, Cabinet Office.
- Reginald Lewis Worsfold, Member for Personnel, British Gas Corporation.

Diplomatic Service and Overseas List

- Alan Collings, Financial and Development Secretary, Gibraltar.
- John Dare. For services to the British community in Zambia and to Anglo-Zambian relations.
- John de Fleurriet Delaforce. For services to the British community in Oporto.
- Michael John Falconer-Flint. For services to British commercial interests in Sydney.
- Ronald Vincent Giddy, Commissioner of Inland Revenue, Hong Kong.
- Gavin Joseph Buckle Green, MBE. For services to British commercial interests and to the British community in Cairo.
- John Gilbert Hanson, lately British Council Representative, Iran.
- Vassel Godfrey Johnson, OBE, Financial Secretary, Cayman Islands.
- Una Gertrude Lister. For services to medicine in Nigeria.
- John Edwin Alfred Miles, OBE, British High Commissioner, Mbabane.
- Sydney Miller, OBE. For public services in the Falkland Islands.
- Nigel Francis Overy. For services to British commercial interests and to the British community in Thailand.
- Alfred Ramsay Petrie. For services to the British community in Singapore.
- Keith Owen Shipley, OBE, lately Special Adviser to the Chief Minister, Gilbert Islands.
- Clement Spearman, HM Ambassador, Santo Domingo.
- Bryan Edwin Swingler, Education Adviser, British Council, India.
- Horace Walwin Young, QC. For public services in Belize.

Australian States

State of New South Wales

- Professor David Gilbert Benjafield, Dean of the Faculty of Law, University of Sydney.
- Brian John Downey Page, of Point Piper. For service to commerce.
- Dulcie Stretton, of Paddington. For service to the community.

State of Victoria

- Lorna Lloyd-Green, OBE, of Toorak. For service to medicine as a doctor.
- Owen James Whelan, of Templestowe. For service to commerce and industry.

State of Queensland

- Roy Charles Cooper, of St Lucia. For his contribution to the banking profession and service to the community.
- Roy Heather Fields, of Corinda. Formerly Chairman, Public Service Board.

State of Western Australia

- Richard Cleaver, of South Perth. For services to the community.
- Murray Willoughby James, of Perth. For services to journalism and the community.

==== Officer of the Order of the British Empire (OBE) ====
Military Division

Royal Navy

- Commander Roy Barrington Brooke.
- Commander Edward Robert Chapman.
- Commander Alan Gray.
- Commander Michael Royffe Hare.
- Commander Michael John Howitt.
- Commander Walter Cyril Kirk.
- Lieutenant Colonel George Umfreville Manuel, Royal Marines Reserve.
- Reverend John David Pibworth, Royal Naval Reserve.
- Acting Commander Cecil Edward Robins.
- Commander George Derek Stubbs.
- Commander Michael Owen Taylor.
- Commander Antony Guy Worsley.

Army

- Colonel (Acting) George Scott Aitken (389683), Army Cadet Force, Territorial and Army Volunteer Reserve.
- Major (Acting Lieutenant Colonel) William John Dickson Bradfield, MC TD, (321283), Royal Army Medical Corps, Territorial and Army Volunteer Reserve.
- Lieutenant Colonel Daniel Patrick Cadoux-Hudson (397200), Corps of Royal Engineers.
- Lieutenant Colonel (Staff Quartermaster) Hedley George Higman Croft, MBE, (474773), Royal Army Ordnance Corps (now R.A.R.O.).
- Lieutenant Colonel James Alexander Dunsmure (441089), Scots Guards.
- Lieutenant Colonel Charles Alexander Ewing (463420), Royal Regiment of Artillery.
- Lieutenant Colonel Robert John Hayman-Joyce (474714) The Royal Hussars (Prince of Wales's Own).
- Lieutenant Colonel Christopher Arthur Searle Hinton (374182), The Royal Green Jackets.
- Lieutenant Colonel (now Acting Colonel) David Herbert Jenkinson, MBE, (430346), Royal Regiment of Artillery.
- Lieutenant Colonel Michael David Johnstone (481448), Royal Army Pay Corps.
- Lieutenant Colonel Michael Leslie Mathams (442835), Royal Army Ordnance Corps.
- Lieutenant Colonel Graham William Parker (423423), Royal Corps of Transport.
- Lieutenant Colonel John Keith Pitt (430177), Royal Corps of Transport.
- Lieutenant Colonel Charles Alexander Ramsay (449039), The Royal Scots Dragoon Guards (Carabiniers and Greys).
- Lieutenant Colonel Brian Thomas (413892), Corps of Royal Military Police.
- Lieutenant Colonel (now Acting Colonel) Michael Robert Volkers (443581), Army Air Corps.
- Lieutenant Colonel (now Acting Colonel) Edward George Willmott (449082), Corps of Royal Engineers.

Royal Air Force

- Wing Commander William Reo Carr (2354528).
- Wing Commander John Anthony Connell (4008324).
- Wing Commander Ronald Alfred Edwards (607376).
- Wing Commander (now Group Captain) Joan Hopkins (2826839), Women's Royal Air Force.
- Wing Commander Brian Conrad Johnson (607987).
- Wing Commander Roy Langstaff, AFC, (4040354).
- Wing Commander Michael Thomas Noel Liddiard (607501).
- Wing Commander Norman Roper (2572379).
- Wing Commander David Malcolm Smith (592833).
- Wing Commander John Buchanan Thorne (2771555).
- Wing Commander Nigel John Tidmus (584773).
- Wing Commander Nigel John Russell Walpole (3511028).

Civil Division

- Benjamin Leslie Alexander, General Medical Practitioner, Manchester.
- Douglas Ambrose, Principal Scientific Officer, National Physical Laboratory.
- Kenneth Paxton Anderson, lately Veterinary Surgeon, Stirling.
- Hylda, Mrs. Armstrong, lately Chairman, Northern Ireland Consumer Council.
- Alan George Osborn Ashpole, County Land Agent and Valuer, Cambridgeshire County Council.
- Leslie Pearson Bamford, lately Chairman, Garment and Allied Industries Requirements Board.
- James Pirie Bannerman. For services to the Pharmaceutical Society of Great Britain.
- Richard Hedderwick Barclay, T.D., Chairman, Child Health Programme Planning Group, Scottish Health Service Planning Council.
- The Reverend Gordon Emerson Barritt, Principal, National Children's Home.
- John Barry, lately District Nursing Officer, West Sussex Area Health Authority.
- Fritz Beer, lately President, Foreign Press Association, London.
- George William Bell, County Secretary, Tyne and Wear, Soldiers', Sailors' and Airmen's Families Association.
- Francis George Bellchambers, T.D., Principal, Department of Transport
- Miss Nancy Blackburn, Head, Department of Catering Studies, Huddersfield Polytechnic.
- John Joseph Blackstock, Director of Industrial Relations, Lucas Girling Ltd., Cwmbran, Gwent.
- Ernest Thomas William Bowen, formerly Principal Scientific Officer, Ministry of Defence.
- Thomas Jackson Brannon, Assistant Works Manager, Ashington, Alcan (U.K.) Ltd.
- Miss Beatrice Mary Bray. For services to the community in Filey.
- Robert Brennand, Principal Professional and Technology Officer, Department of Health and Social Security.
- Geoffrey Edward Brett, E.R.D., lately General Manager (Class 1), South Central Area, London Telecommunications Region, Post Office.
- Ronald William Buckingham, National Vice-Chairman, The Royal British Legion.
- The Reverend Canon Peter Buckler, Director, J. Arthur Rank Centre. For services to agriculture.
- Tom Byatt. For services to the community in Stoke-on-Trent.
- Wing Commander Noel John Capper, A.F.C. For services to the Royal Air Forces Association in Scotland.
- George Carruthers, Member for Personnel Services, Board of National Bus Company.
- Squire Clayton, Statistician, Ministry of Agriculture, Fisheries and Food.
- Gordon Clifford, Chairman, Clifford's Dairies Ltd.
- Jack Coates, lately Principal, Ministry of Defence.
- The Reverend Monsignor John Conroy, Administrator, Motherwell Cathedral.
- Kenneth Clifford Cook, Chairman, Merseyside Improved Houses.
- Raymond Edgar Cooke, Managing Director, K E F Electronics Ltd. For services to Export.
- Miss Kathleen Dorothea Beale Cooper, Senior Principal, Ministry of Defence.
- The Reverend William Thomas Cowlan, lately Director, Council for Christian Care in Devon.
- William Aubrey Craig, Treasurer, Association of Young Farmers' Clubs of Ulster.
- George Bryan Crosthwaite, T.D., Chairman, Bronx Engineering Company Limited, Stourbridge. For services to Export.
- John Allan Cuthbertson, Senior Principal, Department for National Savings.
- Frederick Arthur Cutting, Q.P.M., Chief Constable, Northamptonshire Police.
- Winifred Monica, Mrs. Dance, M.B.E. For services to the Society •for the Protection of Ancient Buildings.
- Percival Robert Dashwood, Managing Director, British Rail Property Board.
- Frederic Thomas Day, Veterinary Surgeon, Newmarket.
- Miss Mary Elizabeth Dean, County Superintendent, Cheshire, St. John Ambulance Brigade.
- James Henry Denyer, Director, Newcastle Airport.
- Clive Derby, Chief Executive, British Hotels, Restaurants and Caterers' Association.
- Robert Donington, Writer and Musician.
- Ernest Dowson, lately, Headmaster, Grange School, Oldham.
- Miss Ursula Anne Lindsay Dreydel, Principal, St. Clare's Hall, Oxford.
- Fred Dunkerley, Chairman, Standard Mill, Rochdale.
- Eric Arthur James Edwards, M.C., lately Principal Officer, Centres Section, Sports Council.
- David Clark Elsbury, Deputy Managing Director, Racal Electronics Ltd. For services to Export.
- Eric Stanley James Elston, Member, Fisheries Research and Development Board.
- Walter James George Evans. For services to local government in Powys.
- Miss Mary Isolen Fergusson, Consultant, Blyth and Blyth (Consulting Civil Engineers).
- Norman Firstbrook, Chief Accountant, Department of Industry.
- Douglas Norman Fogden, Assistant Chief Surveyor (Estates), Metropolitan Police Office.
- Charles Forde, Headmaster, Kenmure St. Mary's School, Bishopbriggs, Glasgow.
- Gerald Marcel Forty, Director, Fine Arts Department, British Council.
- Walter Jonathan Foster, General Secretary, Anglo-Austrian Society.
- Pauline Margaret Wrench, Mrs. Frankland, M.B.E. For services to the Girl Guides Association in London and the South East.
- Alexander McCulloch French, Chairman, Spinney's (1948) Ltd. For services to Export.
- Robert Justin Froggatt, Chief Research Laboratories, EMI Ltd. Scientist, Central
- Edzell Trevor John Fuge, District Alkali Inspector, Department of Employment.
- James Herbert Thompson Gardham, Director of Social Services, Humberside County Council.
- David Hall Gibson. For services to youth in Cheshire.
- Dermot Michael Gillespie, Joint Managing Director, Olivers (Barnstaple) Ltd.
- John Hendry Hepburn Gillespie, Managing Director, Port of Tyne Authority.
- Victor George Gotts, Senior Principal, Home Office.
- Miss Margaret Ethel Grainger, Senior Principal, Department of Health and Social Security.
- Thomas Francis Guest, Station Manager, Aberthaw ' A ' and ' B ' Stations, South Western Region, Central Electricity Generating Board.
- Miss Elizabeth Joan Hardy, lately Regional Administrator, North Western Region, Women's Royal Voluntary Service.
- Glanville Harries, Senior Principal Scientific Officer, Ministry of Defence.
- Clifford Roy Harington, Director, Ellis and Goldstein (Holdings) Ltd. For services to Export.
- Frederick Ernest Harris. For services to the baking industry.
- Michael Rendel Harris, Overseas Director, Oxfam.
- Lieutenant Colonel James Malcolm Harrison, T.D., Chairman, Liverpool Cathedral Executive Committee.
- John Hayes, County Engineer, Greater Manchester Metropolitan County Council.
- Frederick James Percival Haynes, Principal, Department of Trade.
- Austin Haywood, M.B.E., Q.P.M., Deputy Chief Constable, West Yorkshire Metropolitan Police.
- John William Heath, Deputy Collector, Board of Customs and Excise.
- Miss Joan Gloria Hickmott, Primary Schools Adviser, Dorset County Council.
- Joseph Geoffrey Hilton. For services to the magistracy in Leicester.
- Miss Lisbeth Hockey, Director, Nursing Research Unit, Department of Nursing Studies, University of Edinburgh.
- John Lindsay Hogg, lately Health Service Administrator, Northern Ireland.
- Kenneth Lionel Hollingsworth, Chief Probation Officer, Essex Probation and After-Care Service.
- Christopher James Edward Hosegood, Divisional Managing Director, Aviation Division, Smiths Industries Ltd. For services to Export.
- William Houghton, Chief Fire Officer, Oxfordshire Brigade.
- Ronald Houston, Chief Medical Officer, Shell U.K. Ltd.
- Beatrice, Mrs. Howard, Member, London Borough Council of Ealing.
- Frederick Hugh Howorth, Chairman and Managing Director, Howorth Group of Companies.
- Glyn Owen Hughes, Principal, Board of Inland Revenue.
- Charles Hunnisett. For charitable services in Sussex.
- George Alexander Hunter. For services to Sport and particularly to the Scottish Amateur Rowing Association.
- Stewart Ross Ingram. For services to the development of modern language teaching.
- Donald Hamilton Irvine, Regional Adviser in General Practice, University of Newcastle upon Tyne.
- William James Jackson, Chief Executive, Doncaster Metropolitan Borough Council.
- Senator Reginald Robert Jeune, Chairman, Trustee Savings Bank of the Channel Islands.
- Ivor Norman Jones, Principal Planning Officer, Department of the Environment.
- Thomas Kelly, lately Government Secretary, Isle of Man.
- Marjorie Hilda, Mrs. Kenning, President, Derbyshire Branch, British Red Cross Society.
- Alexander Kenworthy. For services to the Guild of Agricultural Correspondents.
- Francis Henry King, Author.
- Miss Cleo Laine (Clementina Dinah, Mrs. Dankworth), Singer.
- Thomas Gerald Lamford, Commandant, Police Staff College, Bramshill.
- John Walter Victor Licence, Director of Corporate Planning, British Gas Corporation.
- Dorothy Mary, Mrs. Liddell, Chairman, Surrey Small Industries Committee, Council for Small Industries in Rural Areas.
- David Cameron Lindsay, Group Managing Director, Whatlings Ltd.
- Charles Lovell, National Secretary, Plumbing Section, Electrical, Electronic, Telecommunication and Plumbing Union.
- Professor Edward Joseph Lister Lowbury, lately Bacteriologist, Industrial Injuries and Burns Unit, Medical Research Council.
- Harry McCree, District Nursing Officer, Hampshire Area Health Authority.
- Henry Montgomery McCullough, B.E.M., Assistant Chief Constable, Royal Ulster Constabulary.
- Terence MacDonagh, B.E.M. (John Alfred Terence MacDonagh), Oboe Player.
- Ronald Macdonald, Director of Education, Highland Region.
- Miss Maisie McGuigan. For services to education in Scotland.
- Donald McLaughlin, Principal, Department of Education and Science.
- Roderick MacAulay McMillan. Actor.
- William Macrae, General Manager, Nuclear Power Company Ltd.
- Major Arthur Ernest Majendie, Administrative Director, International Institute for Strategic Studies.
- Eric Charles Marsden, Chairman, Hertfordshire Association of Boys' Clubs.
- Clifford Walter Martin, lately Principal, Department of Employment.
- James Trevor Mason, District Administrator, Salisbury Health District.
- Miss Pauline Mary Matthews, lately Area Nursing Officer, Dyfed Area Health Authority.
- Reginald Stuart Medlock, Technical Consultant, George Kent Ltd.
- Miss Patricia Millen, Senior Inspector of Taxes, Board of Inland Revenue.
- Keith Kirkman Mitchell. For services to Sport and particularly to Basketball.
- Colonel John Rupert Patrick Montgomery, M.C., Secretary, Anti-Slavery Society.
- Lieutenant Colonel Claude Fortescue Nason, lately Jurat of the Royal Court of Guernsey.
- William Turnbull Neill, M.B.E., Director, Lostock Factory, Dynamics Group, British Aerospace.
- George Edward Horace Newton, Energy Executive, Reed International Ltd.
- James Charles Weir Nicol, Chief Executive, Kilmarnock and Loudoun District Council.
- Trevor Gail Goodier Norman, Senior Architect, Department of Finance, Northern Ireland.
- John Henry Northard, Director, North Derbyshire Area, National Coal Board.
- William Hamer Orchard, B.E.M., lately Headmaster, Radcliffe School, Wolverton, Milton Keynes.
- Captain Arthur James Pack, R.N. (Ret'd) lately Director, Royal Naval Museum, Portsmouth.
- Charles Grenville Parsons, D.S.C., Director of Technology, Stone Manganese Marine Ltd.
- Leslie George Penhaligan. For services to local government and to the Water Authority in Wales.
- Philip John Broad Perkins, Chairman, Southern Newspapers Ltd., Southampton.
- Miss Margaret Isobel Quass, Director, Council for Education in World Citizenship.
- Raymond Raby, Divisional Manager, Supplies and Production Control, Scunthorpe Division, British Steel Corporation.
- James John Rainthorpe, Farmer, Lincolnshire.
- Charles Norman Ribbeck, Member, Cheshire County Council.
- Walter Richardson. For services to the Institution of Gas Engineers.
- Cyril Lewis Ricketts, lately Chairman, Transport Users' Consultative Committee for Wales.
- Leonard John Rogers. Marketing Director, Weybridge-Bristol Division Aircraft Group, British Aerospace. For services to Export.
- Thomas William Francis Rosser. For services to agriculture in Wales.
- Miss Phyllis Rosanna Maud Rowe, lately Divisional Nursing Officer, Kensington, Chelsea and Westminster Area Health Authority.
- James William Berry Ruffle, Member of Professional Committee, Schools Council.
- Vera Maud, Mrs. Searle, Chairman, Women's Amateur Athletic Association.
- James Robert Seaton, Principal Keeper of Printed Books, National Library of Scotland.
- Ernest Olver Lacey Seccombe, Secretary, Central Council of the Irish Linen Industry.
- Thomas Seymour, Vice-Chairman, Northern Ireland Housing Executive and for services to local government.
- Captain George Greville Shadbolt, T.D., President, Federation of Old Comrades Associations.
- George William Shield, Headmaster, Mexborough Grammar School.
- John Simon Gabriel Simmons, M.B.E., Librarian, Codrington Library, All Souls College, University of Oxford.
- Charles Adrian Sinker, Director, Field Studies Council.
- Robert Smith, Member, Food and Drink Economic Development Council.
- Peter Chalmers Somerville, Director, Peterhead Bay (Management) Company Ltd.
- Alexander Logan Speirs, Consultant Paediatrician, Forth Valley Health Board and Royal Hospital for Sick Children, Glasgow.
- Norman George Walter Stagg, Deputy General Secretary, Union of Post Office Workers.
- Ernest Frederick Starnes, Chairman, Thorn Benham Ltd.
- Donald Henry Stevenson, M.B.E. For services to the Ulster Savings Committee.
- David Ross Stoddart, Lecturer, Department of Geography, University of Cambridge.
- Derek Acton Stow, Architect.
- Colonel John Anthony Sulivan, General Manager, Milford Haven Conservancy Board.
- Shaun Alfred Graham Sutton, Head of Drama Group, Television, British Broadcasting Corporation.
- John Waistell Toft, Member, Durham County Council.
- Leslie Herbert Barker-Tufft, General Dental Practitioner, Chippenham, Wiltshire.
- Alfred Hanson Turner, Treasurer, Amateur Swimming Association.
- Robert Graham Wade. For services to Chess.
- Sydney Alfred Warner, M.B.E., D.S.C., Chief Diving Inspector, Department of Energy.
- Harry Wileman, Member, Leicestershire County Council.
- John Robert Wills, Chairman, Manpower Services Commission, Special Programmes, Cumbria Area Board.
- Bryan Lorrain Humphreys Wilson, Chief Scientist, Allen Clark Research Centre, Plessey Company Ltd.
- Gordon Lee Wilson, D.F.C., Managing Director, Scottish Farm Dairy Foods.
- George Thomas Wood, lately Transport Manager, GKN Screws and Fasteners Ltd.
- John William Woodcock, Member, Cambridgeshire Area Health Authority.
- Jimmy Young (Leslie Ronald Young), Radio Broadcaster.
- John Thomas Young, lately adviser on Higher and Further Education, Sandwell Metropolitan Borough.

Diplomatic Service and Overseas List

- Ronald William Allan. For services to British commercial interests and the British community in the Netherlands.
- The Reverend Alan John Amos. For services to the community in Beirut.
- Derrick Aspinall, lately British Council Representative, Venezuela.
- Atanraoi Baiteke. For public and community services in the Gilbert Islands.
- Nicholas Barron, Parliamentary Draftsman, Ministry of Justice, Malawi.
- Martin Gilbert Barrow. For services to British commercial interests in Japan.
- Crystal Margaret Bennett. For services to archaeology in Jordan and to Anglo-Jordanian relations.
- Alan Christopher Boxer. For services to British commercial interests in Greece.
- Guillermo Packenham Bridges, MBE, Honorary British Vice-Consul, Rio Grande, Argentina.
- The Right Honourable Martin Stanley, Viscount Buckmaster, First Secretary and Head of Chancery, HM Embassy, Sana'a.
- Eric Guillermo Campbell. For services to British commercial interests in Argentina.
- Monica Mary Charlot. For services to Anglo-French academic relations.
- David John Llewellyn Chetwin. For services to British commercial interests and the community in Dubai.
- Alister Chisholm. For services to printing in Nigeria and to Anglo-Nigerian relations.
- Victor Constantine Constant. For services to the British community in Paris.
- Douglas Christopher Vincent Cooper, MBE. For services to ex-Servicemen in Belgium.
- Ernest Oswald Corrie. For services to British commercial interests and the British community in Brazil.
- Doctor Betty Cowan. For medical and welfare services to the community in the Punjab, India.
- John Bryan Dunnill. For services to British commercial interests in Nigeria.
- Lieutenant Colonel Stanley Owens Edwards, MC TD. For services to ex-Servicemen in Paris.
- Trefor Owen Ellis. For services to the development of the sugar industry in Guyana.
- Howard Archibald Fergus. For services to education and the community in Montserrat.
- Dennis Houston Fowler, MBE, First Secretary and Head of Chancery, HM Embassy, Kathmandu.
- Major Edward John Gange-Harris, MBE, Census Administrator, Government of Malawi.
- Arthur Gillatt. For services to British commercial interests in Qatar.
- David Gordon. For services to the British community in Argentina.
- Antoni Gwidon Goscinski. For medical services to the community in Belize.
- Leslie David Hale, lately First Secretary, British High Commission, New Delhi.
- Gerald Arthur Harknett, QPM CPM, Deputy Director, Independent Commission Against Corruption, Hong Kong.
- Whitfield Frederick Hayward, MBE. For services to the community in Bermuda.
- Vivian John William Hoad. For services to British engineering interests in Saudi Arabia.
- Alan James Horan. For services to British commercial interests in Abu Dhabi.
- Thomas Victor Hunt. For services to British commercial interests and the British community in Jordan.
- Doctor Dinah Mary James. For services to medical education and research in Nigeria.
- William John James, MBE CPM. For services to the British community in Kenya.
- Clive Roderick Jones, Director, Geological Survey, Government of Botswana.
- Joseph Tomlinson Jowers. For services to the British community in Huelva and to Anglo-Spanish relations.
- Donald Millar Keith. For services to British commercial interests in Japan.
- Agnew Barry Grange Laing. For services to leprosy research in Malaysia.
- James Gordon Murray Land. For services to British commercial interests in Spain.
- Richard Le Fanu, British Council Representative, Cyprus.
- Tat-shing Leung. For public services in Hong Kong.
- Edward Derek Oswald Maltman, First Secretary and Consul, HM Embassy, Baghdad.
- Dennis Trevor Llewellyn Marr, MBE, lately Honorary British Vice-Consul, Maracaibo, Venezuela.
- Pamela Dora Eileen Marshall. For services to the British Community in Kyrenia, Cyprus.
- Clive Reginald Morgan. For services to British commercial interests and the British community in Dhahran, Saudi Arabia.
- Alfred Cyril Morris, Deputy Commissioner of Police, Bermuda.
- Charles Geoffrey Mortlock, Deputy British High Commissioner, Saint Lucia.
- Mario Nava. For services to British commercial interests in Italy.
- Frederick Charles Parker. For services to the British community in Lima.
- The Reverend Walter Reginald Guy Pellant. For services to the community in Geneva.
- Clifford Pollock. For services to education in Nigeria.
- Douglas James Brownfield Powell. For services to British commercial interests in Oman.
- Frederick Leon Charles Rameaux, lately HM Consul, British Consulate-General, Milan.
- John Garrett Richardson. For services to the British community in Trinidad.
- Fred William John Saar. For services to British engineering interests in Qatar.
- Edgar Henry Semmens, Deputy Education Adviser, British Council, New Delhi.
- Rouben Ibrahim Shamia. For medical and dental services to the community in Nigeria.
- Ernest Frederick Shenton. For services to education in Turkey and to Anglo-Turkish relations.
- Matthew Spedding. For services to British commercial interests in Pittsburgh.
- Professor Michael Lovell Oxenham Stevens, lately Director of Economic Affairs, Botswana.
- Alexander Hope Stubbs. For services to British interests and the British community in Abadan.
- Walter Martin Sulke. For public services in Hong Kong.
- John Joseph Swaine, QC. For public services in Hong Kong.
- Maurice William Unstead. For services to British commercial interests in Japan.
- loteba Tamuera Uriam, MBE, Manager, Cooperative Society, Tarawa, Gilbert Islands.
- Elizabeth Christina Wallis, MBE, First Secretary (Administration) United Kingdom Mission to the United Nations, New York.
- Hugh Warneford-Thomson. For medical and welfare services to the British community in Argentina.
- Martin John Williams, First Secretary (Commercial) HM Embassy, Tehran.
- Peter Wong. For public services in Hong Kong.
- Andrew Peter Young. For services to British commercial interests in Los Angeles.
- Philip Solomon Zeid. For services in the development of the rubber industry in Malaysia.

Australian States

State of New South Wales

- Nicholas Aboud, of Darling Point. For service to commerce.
- James Robert Angel, of University of Sydney. For service to education and the community.
- Harold Felix Bell, of Balmoral Beach. For service to commerce and the community.
- Jeffrey John Condron, of Lane Cove. For service to broadcasting and the community.
- The Right Reverend Arthur John Dain, of Darling Point. For service to religion.
- John Edward Dixon, of Bexley North. For service to industry.
- Francis Michael Law, of Paddington. For service to public broadcasting.
- Brigadier John Francis McCabe (Salvation Army), of Holdsworthy Milpo. For service to the community.
- John Meillon, of Neutral Bay. For service to the theatre.
- Mary Rossi, of Northwood. For service to the community.
- Arthur Tunstall, of Double Bay. For service to sport.
- Charles Frederick Waller, of Coogee. For service to the community.
- Evelyn Doreen Warburton, of Greenwich. For service to the theatre.

State of Victoria

- Edith Florence Bennett, of Glen Iris. For public service.
- Bernard Gore Brett, of Toorak. For service to the National Trust of Australia (Victoria).
- Douglas Hall Clark, of Beaumaris. For municipal service.
- Francis William Cremean, of North Balwyn. For public service and service to the ethnic community.
- Wilhelmine Anna Lang, of East Malvern. For service to education.
- Councillor Harold Robert Leach, of Newtown. For community service.
- The Reverend William Arnold Loftus, of North Balwyn. For service to the Presbyterian Church.
- Samuel John Everett Loxton, of Red Hill. For service to the parliament of Victoria and sport.
- James Arthur Roche, of Toorak. For service to civil engineering.

State of Queensland

- John Anthony Carroll, of Kingaroy. For service to the community.
- William Fullerton, of Glasshouse Mountains. For service to the pineapple growing industry.
- Terence Murray Lewis, GM QPM, Commissioner of Police, Queensland Police Force.
- Hilary Maude Russell, of Jimbour. For service to the community.
- Lennard Snell, MC, of Bowen. For his services to the community of Bowen, particularly the farming community.
- Christos Lefteris Toumpas, of West End. For service to the Greek community.

State of Western Australia

- Francis Edward Brockman, of Capel. For services to the community.
- James Andrew Del Piano, of Mount Lawley. For services to municipal affairs, the Italian community and care of the environment.
- Patricia Verne Kailis (née Hurse), of Floreat Park. For her contribution in the fields of carrier detection and the detection of inherited diseases.
- John Chester Lee, of Mandurah. For services to the farming and pastoral community.
- Edgar Ashton Nottage, of Floreat Park. For services to music.
- Allan John Scahill, of Crawley. For services to sport, commerce and the community.

==== Member of the Order of the British Empire (MBE) ====
Military Division

Royal Navy

- Lieutenant Commander (SD) Clifford Ball.
- Fleet Chief Radio Electrician Francis Robert Barriskel, M927853D.
- Fleet Chief Air Mechanician (A/E) Gwynne Stephen Chinnock, F910349Y.
- Lieutenant (SD) Robert George Richard Gray.
- Lieutenant Commander Alan Robert Edmund Jones, Royal Naval Reserve.
- Lieutenant Commander (SD) Douglas Leach.
- Lieutenant Commander (SD) Donald William Murdoch.
- Lieutenant Commander (SD) Denis Robert Murphy.
- Lieutenant Commander David Garth Ridgers.
- Lieutenant Commander Edward Richard Ruscombe-King.
- Lieutenant Commander Eric Vernon French Savill.
- Lieutenant Commander (SCC) Walter Terence Weir, Royal Naval Reserve.
- Local Major Donald Raymond Whitcher, Royal Marines.
- Lieutenant (CS) Edward John Williams.

Army

- Major John Barrett (468701), Royal Corps of Signals.
- Captain Frank Ernest James Bartlett (487929), Corps of Royal Engineers.
- 23538075 Warrant Officer Class 2 Peter Roy Burrows, The Queen's Own Yeomanry, Territorial and Army Volunteer Reserve.
- Major (Quartermaster) Terence Joseph Cantle (487645), Royal Corps of Signals.
- Major Ronald Hugh de-Renzy Channer (459226), The Royal Highland Fusiliers (Princess Margaret's Own Glasgow and Ayrshire Regiment).
- Captain (Garrison Engineer) Stanley Robin Collett (502685), Corps of Royal Engineers.
- Major Walter James Courage (467610), 5th Royal Inniskilling Dragoon Guards.
- Major Bruce Anthony Cardew Duncan (468988), Royal Tank Regiment.
- 23783302 Warrant Officer Class 2 Douglas Eeles, Army Catering Corps.
- Major John Holwell Fisher (479225), Royal Corps of Signals.
- Major Donald Forbes, TD, (479554), The Parachute Regiment, Territorial and Army Volunteer Reserve.
- Major Paul Igor French (455582), Royal Corps of Transport.
- Major Roger Dalby Garnett (445863), Corps of Royal Engineers.
- Captain Dennis William Giles (482451), 51st Highland Volunteers, Territorial and Army Volunteer Reserve.
- Captain Richard Edward McConville Gillies (502671), The King's Own Scottish Borderers.
- Captain Antoinette Henriette Harrison (396651), Women's Royal Army Corps (R.A.R.O.).
- Major Richard John Heywood (474385), Coldstream Guards.
- Major Michael David Jackson (475176), The Parachute Regiment.
- Major (Quartermaster) John Herbert Jones (488244), The Royal Welch Fusiliers.
- Major Jeremy Vincent Keyte (440061), The Royal Green Jackets.
- Major (Ordnance Executive Officer) Stanley Lawrence, BEM, (487364), Royal Army Ordnance Corps.
- Captain James Mann Lountain (269916), 52nd Lowland Volunteers, Territorial and Army Volunteer Reserve.
- 22980299 Warrant Officer Class 1 Anthony James Maher, The Queen's Lancashire Regiment.
- 23701983 Warrant Officer Class 1 Thomas Edward McSherry, Royal Regiment of Artillery.
- Major George Sanderson Munro (481518), Intelligence Corps (now R.A.R.O.).
- 22247521 Warrant Officer Class 2 John Mutch, The Argyll and Sutherland Highlanders (Princess Louise's).
- 23825536 Warrant Officer Class 2 David Mycroft, Royal Corps of Transport.
- Major (Quartermaster) Maurice Philip Nott (475930), The Devonshire and Dorset Regiment.
- Major (Quartermaster) Ronald Page (484705), The Parachute Regiment.
- Major (Staff Quartermaster) Brian Alfred Phillips (480234), Royal Army Ordnance Corps.
- Captain (Quartermaster) Raymond Frederick Pye (494751), Corps of Royal Engineers.
- Major John David Rash (457260), Royal Tank Regiment.
- Major Alan Walter Rogers (445299), Corps of Royal Electrical and Mechanical Engineers.
- Major Anthony John Scott (467346), The Staffordshire Regiment (The Prince of Wales's).
- Major Gavin Scott-Forrest (474053), Intelligence Corps.
- 23678542 Warrant Officer Class 1 Peter Standing, The Royal Scots Dragoon Guards (Carabiniers and Greys).
- Major Peter Hugh Sykes (474068), Corps of Royal Electrical and Mechanical Engineers.
- Major (Quartermaster) Sydney Russell Twort, (482286), The Worcestershire and Sherwood Foresters Regiment (29th/45th Foot).
- Major (Acting) James Wallace (389998), Army Cadet Force, Territorial and Army Volunteer Reserve.
- Major (Acting) John Dirk Wallace (480976), Combined Cadet Force, Territorial and Army Volunteer Reserve.
- Major Ivan Dimitri Zvegintzov (476678), Coldstream Guards.

Royal Air Force

- Acting Wing Commander Rex Alan Collinge (2590236), RAF Regiment.
- Squadron Leader Derek Charles Andrews (4231790).
- Squadron Leader Alan Michael Bowman (4230214).
- Squadron Leader Alan Clive Davies (508108).
- Squadron Leader Raymond Charles Ryan Johnston (609292).
- Squadron Leader John Robin Nesbitt McEvoy (608068).
- Squadron Leader Stephen William Richards (4267503).
- Squadron Leader William George Simpson (689320).
- Squadron Leader Arthur John Franklin Smith (3039056).
- Squadron Leader Stanley Cyril Smith (504824).
- Squadron Leader Alexander Campbell Sneddon (4231960).
- Squadron Leader Daphne Anne Veitch-Wilson (2829000), Women's Royal Air Force.
- Squadron Leader Harry Hardwick Woolley (584056).
- Acting Squadron Leader David Thomas Edmunds (5027524), Royal Air Force Volunteer Reserve (Training Branch).
- Acting Squadron Leader Leslie John Gennery (206064), Royal Air Force Volunteer Reserve (Training Branch).
- Flight Lieutenant Donald Francis Barltrop (4094272).
- Flight Lieutenant Ian Buchan Gibb (8025063).
- Flight Lieutenant George Edward Sizeland, OBE, (4013821).
- Flight Lieutenant Stanley Wrathmall Smith (3065584).
- Flight Lieutenant Jeffrey Wright (4253822).
- Warrant Officer David Edward Boon (B4149992).
- Warrant Officer Owen Donnelly (H4133341).
- Warrant Officer William Charles Gordon Gausden, BEM, (E1722859).
- Warrant Officer Alan Edward Sauer (J4171372).
- Warrant Officer Arnold Seymour (N0576439).
- Warrant Officer William Stanley Snook (M4019262).
- Warrant Officer Stuart George Edward Sullivan, BEM, (K19Z1302).
- Warrant Officer Michael John White (U4158174).

Civil Division

- Andrew Robertson Irvine. For services to Rugby Football in Scotland

Diplomatic Service and Overseas List

- Lottie Sebastian Adolphus. For educational and welfare services to the community in Belize.
- Graham Ralph Andrews, Attaché, HM Embassy, Tehran.
- Ida Barlow. For welfare services to the community in Cairo.
- Major Walter Frederick Barrow, lately Commandant, Administration Police Training College, Kenya.
- Helen Irene Beckley. For services to the British community in the Bahamas.
- Mustafa Bedri, Press Officer, British High Commission, Nicosia.
- Ethel Bellizzi, lately Librarian, Information Section, HM Embassy, Rome.
- Daniel Henry Bramble, Clerk to Legislative and Executive Councils, Montserrat.
- Vincent Kevin Brennan, Chief Accountant, Produce Marketing Board, Gambia.
- George Ernest Bucknall, lately Third Secretary, HM Embassy, Prague.
- John Erik Capito, VRD. For services to the community in Yokohama.
- Silas Charles Cayetano, Registrar of Co-operatives and Credit Unions, Belize.
- Sidney Cole, Chief Works Superintendent, Kano State, Nigeria.
- John Leslie Cox. For services to technical development and to the British community in Peru.
- Antonio Silva da Cruz, lately Commercial Attaché, HM Embassy, Luanda.
- Hubert Ernest Augustus Daisley. For public and community services in St Vincent.
- Talaat Shukri Dajani, lately Adviser, Middle East Centre for Arabic Studies, Lebanon.
- John Peter Donnelly, Honorary British Vice Consul, Benidorm, Spain.
- Reginald Luther Dover, lately Superintending Inspector of Factories, Ministry of Labour, Malawi.
- Kathleen Mary Dykes. For nursing and welfare services to children in Morocco.
- Joseph Lawrence Fabre, BEM. For services to the community in Gibraltar.
- Jean Felicity Mary Fenwick. For nursing and welfare services to children in Kenya.
- Arthur Garfitt, First Secretary, British High Commission, Canberra.
- Henry Graham Harris, Vice-Consul, British Consulate, Le Havre.
- Joyce Clara Hawksley, Aid Assistant, British High Commission, Suva.
- Charles Frederick Hazlewood, lately Attaché, HM Embassy, Cairo.
- Constance Agnes Helbing. For services to the British community in Basle.
- William Brown Jack. For welfare services to the community in Argentina.
- Louise Anne Jackson. For cultural services to the community in Bermuda.
- Royston Laurence Kannemeyer, Assistant Representative, British Council, Bahrain.
- Andrew Robson Kennedy. For services to British commercial interests in Kuwait.
- Sze-nuen Lai. For services to the community in Hong Kong.
- Elizabeth Janet Leslie. For services to the British community in New York.
- Michael Norman Long. For services to the teaching of English in Thailand.
- Henry McCrory, Second Secretary, HM Embassy, Tehran.
- Iain Hamilton Macgee, Construction Manager, Ministry of Works, Gilbert Islands.
- Barbara Evelyn Milsom, lately Personal Assistant to HM Minister, Holy See.
- Zarina Minu, Senior Personal Assistant, Urban Services Department, Hong Kong.
- Atlay Digby Morales, Vice-Consul, British Consulate, Mexico City.
- Enid Monica Mya Maung, Librarian, HM Embassy, Rangoon.
- Isabel Ruth Neill. For welfare services to the community in the Nilgiris, India.
- Peter Robert Norris. For services to the British community in Iran.
- Arthur Pardo, Deputy Registrar, Supreme Court, Gibraltar.
- John Challoner Powell, Controller of Stores, Ministry of Works, Malawi.
- Noreen Patricia Rees, Senior Personal Secretary, Political Advisers Office, Hong Kong.
- Annette Reid. For services to the British community in Tenerife.
- Henry Reiher, Superintendent of Works, Ministry of Works, Gilbert Islands.
- Lois Kathleen Richards, Administration Officer, British Consulate, Halifax, Nova Scotia.
- Thomas Morris Ryan. For services to medical training in Nigeria.
- Sheila Schnegg. For services to the British community in California.
- Willie Schutz, Marine Superintendent, Gilbert Islands.
- Mary Corrie Sherer. For services to the British community in Rome.
- David Peter Smith. For services to the British community in Montevideo.
- Victor Yun-lam So, BEM, Regional Commander, Civil Aid Service, Hong Kong.
- The Reverend George Peter Stretton. For services to the community in Labuan, Malaysia.
- Teiaramako Teoiaki, Chief Accountant, Treasury Department, Gilbert Islands.
- John Lancelot Terrell, Chief Technical Officer, Ministry of Agriculture, Malawi.
- Denise Leonie Wells, Personal Assistant, HM Embassy, Brussels.
- Eva Lilian Wilkin. For services to art in St Kitts-Nevis-Anguilla.
- Chung Chuen Wong. For public services in Hong Kong.
- Isabel Frances Woodhead, Personal Secretary, BAOR, Munchen Gladbach.
- Peter Yeung. For services to the community in Hong Kong.
- David Yuk-pui Yip, Principal Industry Officer, Trade Department, Hong Kong.

Australian States

State of New South Wales

- Albert Atkinson, of Yagoona WeSt For service to youth.
- Maxwell William Barnett, of BlakehurSt For service to the community.
- Pamela Marian Barrington, of Bellevue Hill. For service to youth.
- Charles Geoffrey Champion, of Merrylands. For service to medicine and the community.
- Ruth Chong, of Burwood. For service to the ethnic community.
- Dorothy Noreen Collier, of Maroubra. For service to the community.
- George Dechnicaz, of Berala. For service to the ethnic community.
- Douglas Henry Davenport Ellis, of Coonamble. For service to journalism and local government.
- Councillor Francis Norman Farrell, of Shelley Beach. For service to local government and the community.
- Averil Florence Fink, of Middle Cove. For service to the community.
- Isaac Norman Goodman, of Sydney. For service to the community.
- John Basil Keir, of Yowie Bay. For service to the community.
- Reginald Lionel Kermode, of Randwick. For service to the taxi industry.
- Victor Herbert Lewis, of North Entrance. For service to local government and the community.
- Betty Dorothy Lyons, of Brighton Le Sands. For service to nursing.
- George Edward McGuirk, of Gladesville. For service to the community.
- Jean Enid Skuse, of Lane Cove. For service to the community.
- John Wars, of Bellevue Hill. For service to the community.
- Clive Milton Wilson, of Lord Howe Island. For service to the community.
- Wlodzimierz George Wojak, of Carlingford. For service to the ethnic community.
- The Reverend Ernest Wolff, of Bondi Junction. For service to the community.

State of Victoria

- Reginald Thomas Borbidge, of Point Lonsdale. For service to conservation.
- Francis Colman Borbiro, of Glenthompson. For municipal service.
- Alexandra Esther Cameron, of Balwyn. For service to music.
- Augusto Coloretti, of Richmond. For community service.
- Councillor Wilfred John Diffey, of Via SpringhurSt For municipal service.
- The Reverend Eric Keith Ditterich, of Glen Iris, For service to the Uniting Church and education.
- Stanley Milne Gilmour, of Camberwell. For service to senior citizens.
- Councillor Matthew Keith Hallam, of Stawell. For municipal service.
- Louis Joel, of Toorak. For service to medicine as a doctor.
- Norman Francis Keith, of Mooroolbark. For service to pharmacy.
- Geoffrey Wilfred Valentine Lewis, of Moorabbin. For public service.
- Harry Victor Martin, of Beaufort. For municipal service.
- William James Money, of Newtown. For service to scouting.
- Newman Hirsch Rosenthal, of Caulfield. For service to education.
- Ian Malcolm Stockdale, of Mount Waverley. For community service.

State of Queensland

- Norma Cicely Ainsbury Alcorn, of Chermside. For services to YWCA in Queensland.
- Michael Francis Bellet, of Gladstone. For service to the community.
- George Hector Andrew Cormie, of Chapel Hill. For services to the sport of hockey.
- Jean Harvey, of Rockhampton. For service to the community.
- James Houston, of Wooroolin. For service to the community.
- Cecelia Elizabeth McNally, of Spring Hill. For service to the community and the arts.
- Robert Brown McQueen, of Bribie Island. For service to the mining industry and the community.
- Councillor George Clement Charles Maughan, of Bargara. For service to local government.
- David Ronald Rees, of Bowen. For service to the community.
- Hilda Marguerite Spence, of Indooroopilly. For services to the community.
- Mary Stewart, of Hamilton. For service to the community.
- Colin George Story, of Mackay. For services to the sugar industry and the community.

State of Western Australia

- Herbert Charles Elliott, of Geraldton. For services to the community.
- Herbert Belgrave Grosvenor, of East Fremantle. For services to amateur sport.
- Leslie Alfred Hemley, of Wickepin. For services to the community.
- Arthur William Hudleston, of West Dale. For services to veterinary science and the community.
- Rodney Forster Johnston, of Bunbury. For services to the community.
- Sister Mary Martin Kelly. For services to the Catherine McAuley Child Care Centre, Wembley.
- John Herbert Lee, of Palmyra. For services to hockey.
- Francis Robert Lemmon, of Geraldton. For services to the community.
- James Matthew McCulloch, of Hopetoun. For services to the community.
- John Vincent McDonald, of Gnowangerup. For services to the community.
- May Frances Marshall, of Crawley. For services to infant education and the Australian Federation of University Women.
- The Reverend John Harry Ridden, of South Perth. For services to the Baptist church.

=== Order of the Companions of Honour (CH) ===
- Sir Michael Kemp Tippett, CBE. For services to Music.

=== Companion of the Imperial Service Order (ISO) ===
Diplomatic Service and Overseas List

- Talbot Henry Bashall, Urban Services Department, Hong Kong.
- Annie Hannah Calderwood, CPM, lately Chief Superintendent, Royal Hong Kong Police Force.
- Robert William Sampson, Deputy Director of Accounting Services, Hong Kong.

Australian States

State of New South Wales

- John Mountfort Bourke, Chairman of the Housing Commission of New South Wales.

State of Victoria

- Robert Edward Vaughan Donaldson, of Surrey Hills. For service to the State of Victoria.

State of Queensland

- Alan Alexander Ross, Director-General and Under-Secretary, Department of Primary Industries.

State of Western Australia

- Eleanor Lucy Bohan, Principal Director of Nursing, State Medical Department.
- George Henry Cooper, Chairman of the Western Australian Public Service Board.

=== British Empire Medal (BEM) ===
Military Division

Royal Navy

- Radio Electrical Mechanician (A) John Beckett, F979190C.
- Sergeant Peter Noel Biggs, P020210K, Royal Marines.
- Marine Engineering Artificer (H) Kenneth John Clarke, M887631B.
- Acting Chief Petty Officer Writer Ronald Charles Cornes, D091098H.
- Band Colour Sergeant Francis John Cowdrey, Q003500N, Royal Marines.
- Postal Chief Petty Officer Francis Barry Cowen, D980013S, Royal Naval Reserve.
- Chief Radio Electrical Mechanician (A) John Cruddas, F941352J.
- Chief Petty Officer (OPS)EW Brian Durrans, D062248Q.
- Chief Petty Officer Caterer Denis John Farrant, M978097N.
- Chief Joiner Robert Hannah, JD980843S, Royal Naval Reserve.
- Colour Sergeant Roy Leonard Heath, PO18527H, Royal Marines.
- Radio Electrical Artificer Richard Gray House, M943871T.
- Chief Petty Officer (OPS)M Patrick Edward Jeal, J968619D.
- Chief Petty Officer (MW) Geoffrey Graham Lilley, Qd 98245Is, Royal Naval Reserve.
- Chief Marine Engineering Artificer (P) Edward Frederick Lovegrove, M977868F.
- Colour Sergeant Donald Alan Marks, P019402S, Royal Marines.
- Chief Marine Engineering Artificer (CA) Ernest Alfred James Moyes, M803702Q.
- Petty Officer Physical Trainer Gary Oakes, J928345C.
- Chief Petty Officer Steward Michael Leslie Patterson, D069009M.
- Chief Petty Officer Cook Ernest Victor George Read, M942932P.
- Chief Marine Engineering Artificer (P) William Brian Reay, D091824T.
- Chief Wren Regulating Anita Pauline Rourk, QW990310D, Women's Royal Naval Reserve.
- Chief Control Electrical Mechanician John Frederick Simpson, M964672J.
- Chief Petty Officer Writer Anthony Charles Joseph Smyth, JD980844J, Royal Naval Reserve.
- Chief Marine Engineering Mechanician (P) Henry Edward Stannard, K94161Sh.
- Chief Wren Regulating Merlyn Elizabeth Willey, W118557R.
- Chief Wren Family Service Joy Maureen Williams, W112862Q.
- Chief Petty Officer (OPS)R Miles Stuart Braid Williams, J944131V.
- Chief Petty Officer Cook Royston John Yeomans, M901291V.

Army

- 23650938 Staff Sergeant Jim Adey, Coldstream Guards.
- 23834530 Staff Sergeant Nicholas Angus, The Parachute Regiment.
- 23855244 Staff Sergeant Michael Asquith, Corps of Royal Electrical and Mechanical Engineers.
- 23474589 Sergeant Michael Patrick Bambrick, Coldstream Guards.
- 23925854 Staff Sergeant Bernard Barber, Corps of Royal Engineers.
- 23682354 Corporal Neville Belton, Corps of Royal Engineers.
- 24111337 Sergeant Robert Paul Theodorus Besseling, Royal Army Ordnance Corps.
- 23726220 Staff Sergeant Michael Stirling Bostock, Corps of Royal Electrical and Mechanical Engineers.
- 22309008 Staff Sergeant Alan Leslie Budd, Corps of Royal Electrical and Mechanical Engineers (now discharged).
- 23495213 Sergeant John Oliver Clavin, Army Catering Corps.
- 23964341 Staff Sergeant Robin David Clow, Corps of Royal Engineers.
- 23532924 Staff Sergeant Joseph Francis Curry, The Royal Regiment of Fusiliers.
- 24145497 Sergeant Gareth Norman Curtis, Royal Army Ordnance Corps.
- 23944400 Staff Sergeant Bruce Norman Douglas, Royal Corps of Signals.
- 23902672 Staff Sergeant Frederick Thornton Downie, Royal Pioneer Corps.
- 22971035 Staff Sergeant Derek Evans, The Black Watch (Royal Highland Regiment).
- 24152933 Corporal David Gartside, Royal Army Ordnance Corps.
- 24070039 Corporal Keith James Blake Head, The Parachute Regiment.
- 23891603 Staff Sergeant Roger Keith Herbert, Royal Tank Regiment.
- 22716688 Staff Sergeant Brian Arthur Huggins, Royal Corps of Transport, Territorial and Army Volunteer Reserve.
- 21154269 Sergeant (Acting Staff Sergeant) Indraprasad Gurung, 2nd King Edward VII's Own Gurkha Rifles (The Sirmoor Rifles).
- 23952146 Staff Sergeant Corin Jones, Royal Army Medical Corps.
- 24176382 Sergeant James Kitchen, Royal Army Ordnance Corps.
- 14435881 Staff Sergeant (Acting Warrant Officer Class 2) Carl Werner Lax, Royal Army Ordnance Corps.
- 23940230 Corporal Lawrence Lee, Corps of Royal Engineers, Territorial and Army Volunteer Reserve.
- 24066826 Sergeant David John Leightley, Corps of Royal Engineers.
- 24145981 Sergeant (Acting Staff Sergeant) Christopher John Mabbott, Royal Army Ordnance Corps.
- 24007541 Sergeant David Thomas Manning, Army Catering Corps.
- 22284192 Sergeant John Robert Matt, Royal Regiment of Artillery.
- 22499005 Staff Sergeant Kenneth James McCall, Royal Corps of Signals, Territorial and Army Volunteer Reserve (now discharged).
- 24118595 Corporal Gordon Melrose, The Royal Highland Fusiliers (Princess Margaret's Own Glasgow and Ayrshire Regiment).
- 22216887 Sergeant Thomas Moon, Irish Guards.
- 24017067 Staff Sergeant Terence Anthony Moses, The Green Howards (Alexandra, Princess of Wales's Own Yorkshire Regiment).
- 23477460 Staff Sergeant Denis Palmer, Royal Army Ordnance Corps.
- 23834344 Sergeant John Francis Peck, Corps of Royal Engineers.
- 23674385 Sergeant William Redmond, The Royal Irish Rangers (27th (Inniskilling), 83rd and 87th).
- 24235203 Sergeant James Keith Reynolds, Royal Army Ordnance Corps.
- 24119554 Sergeant Charles Salmon, Royal Army Ordnance Corps.
- 23862487 Staff Sergeant John William Simpson, Royal Army Ordnance Corps.
- 23733802 Staff Sergeant Peter John Sloover, Corps of Royal Engineers.
- 23492347 Staff Sergeant Alan William Smith, The Staffordshire Regiment (The Prince of Wales's).
- 24077268 Staff Sergeant David Alan Smith, Corps of Royal Engineers.
- 23982722 Sergeant Paul Louis Smith, The Royal Anglian Regiment.
- 24378845 Lance Corporal Wayne Allan Smith, Army Catering Corps.
- 24024169 Staff Sergeant Nicholas Alexander Christian Van Der Bijl, Intelligence Corps.

Royal Air Force

- H2588882 Flight Sergeant Cedric Max Selwyn Avey.
- W0593377 Flight Sergeant David Peter Beck.
- R0587148 Flight Sergeant Ronald Edward Belk.
- Q0585744 Flight Sergeant Patrick Groves.
- X1925468 Flight Sergeant Terence Patrick Hammond.
- C4105751 Flight Sergeant Charles Windsor James.
- B1934409 Flight Sergeant Robert Lowe.
- F4258599 Flight Sergeant John Aloysius Mullan.
- B1920408 Flight Sergeant Jack Pidduck.
- W0681633 Flight Sergeant David Graham Read.
- S4182579 Flight Sergeant Gerald Ernest John Richmond.
- R3524677 Flight Sergeant Brian Smith.
- C1926601 Flight Sergeant (now Warrant Officer) Anthony Philip Williams.
- E2839086 Flight Sergeant Jennifer May Winspear, Women's Royal Air Force.
- A0686581 Chief Technician Ian Arthur Boyland.
- Q4106372 Chief Technician Frederick Brooks.
- T4264386 Chief Technician Terence Keith Dolby.
- R1937418 Chief Technician William Denis McIlraith.
- W1924166 Chief Technician Robert John Mayne.
- U1930300 Chief Technician Patrick William Porter.
- S0685141 Chief Technician Edward Henry Winchester.
- C4196829 Sergeant Leslie William Baldwin.
- K1938946 Sergeant Philemon Colin Lippett.
- F4196079 Sergeant John Lynn Rees.
- R4197664 Sergeant Bernard Rice.
- S8039584 Sergeant Edith Skelton, Women's Royal Air Force.
- V4278845 Sergeant John Raymond Taylor.
- X4195720 Sergeant Roy Thompson.
- X1947096 Corporal John David Evans.

Civil Division

Overseas Territories

- Au Kim-hung, Warden, Sea School, Hong Kong.
- Beretiata Beretiata, Electrical Foreman, Public Utilities Board, Tarawa, Gilbert Islands.
- Adolf Burke Brown, Senior Mechanic, Police Transport Workshop, Belize.
- Chan William Wai-lam, Assistant City District Officer (Liaison), Eastern District, Hong Kong.
- Petronella Melencia Ebanks, Postmistress, West Bay, Cayman Islands.
- Kenneth Law, Senior Clerical Officer, Urban Services Department, Hong Kong.
- Law Sui-wing, Senior Clerical Officer, Sha Tin District Land Registry, Hong Kong.
- Ruth Caroline Le Breton, Staff Nurse, Public Health Department, St Helena.
- Alfred McGrail, Fireman, Gibraltar Fire Brigade.
- Poon Lai-chiu, Senior Clerical Office, Prisons Department, Hong Kong.
- William Harold Sylvester, Accountant, Treasury and Customs Department, Hong Kong.
- Teke Tebiri, Chief Butler and Driver, Government House, Gilbert Islands.
- Birim Teitiba, Mechanical Foreman, Ministry of Works and Public Utilities, Gilbert Islands.
- James Williamson, Clerical Officer, Telephones Department, Gibraltar.
- Wong Kong, Telecommunications Assistant I, Police Department, Hong Kong.

Australian States

State of New South Wales

- Maxwell Lesley Arkell, of Eugowra. For service to ex-servicemen.
- Maxwell George Armstrong, of Revesby. For service to youth.
- Lorna Grace Atkinson, of Eastwood. For service to the community.
- Treania Helen Lindsay Bennett, of Avalon Beach. For service to art.
- Charles Conroy Bradley, of Armidale. For service to the community.
- George Lawrence Butt, of Orange. For service to sport
- Dulcie Beth Callinan, of Warners Bay. For service to music.
- James Walker Cunningham, of Regents Park. For service to ex-servicemen.
- Claire Ellen Dawe, of Bankstown. For service to the community.
- Heather Esme Rebecca Donoghoe, of Queanbeyan. For service to the community.
- Edith Roma May Dunkley, of East Maitland. For service to the community.
- Alexander William Ferguson, of Frenchs ForeSt For service to the community.
- Norah Eugenie Gibbons, of Griffith. For service to the community.
- Dorothy May Glover, of Avalon Beach. For service to nursing.
- Kenneth Amor Ingram, of Nyngan. For service to youth.
- Dorothy Ada Kerr, of Vaucluse. For service to dancing.
- Ruth Elizabeth Ladd, of Lindfield. For service to music.
- Jane Kathleen MacCallum, of Cremorne. For service to the community.
- Julia Ann McNeill, of Bourke. For service to the community.
- Florence Emma MacPherson, of Hurstville. For service to the community.
- Joy Elaine Mark, of Hurstville. For service to ex-servicewomen.
- Harry Nies, of Coogee. For service to ex-servicemen.
- Dorothy Matilda O'Halloran, of Hunters Hill. For service to the community.
- Rachel Mary Roxburgh, of Moss Vale. For service to the community.
- Dorothy Margaret Alice Smith, of Mortdale. For service to the community.
- Elizabeth Jane Steele, of Vaucluse. For service to the community.
- Eric Utick, of Miranda. For service to the community.
- Jean Azile Van Nooten, of McMahons Point. For service to the community.
- Meta Lima Walker, of Mayfield. For service to the community.
- Jean Watson, of Woolahra. For service to the community.
- Emily Doris Wigzell, of Narrabeen. For service to ex-servicemen.
- Helen Margaret Wilkins, of Glebe. For service to the community.

State of Victoria

- Deaconess Norma Enid Anguey, of Mount Evelyn. For community service.
- Roy Edward Ash, of East Malvern. For service to youth organisations.
- John McKay Cannon, of Bendigo. For service to the performing arts.
- Charlotte Eliza Gibbins, of Heywood. For community service.
- Mary Catherine Gillespie, of Caulfield. For community service.
- Albert James Hanham, Sergeant, Victoria Police Force, of North Dandenong. For public service.
- Maurice Gerald Hevey, of Ivanhoe. For service to the sport of archery.
- Nancy Hillas, of North Balwyn. For service to community welfare.
- Dorothy Gertrude Hobson, of Camberwell. For service to consumer affairs.
- Olive Beatrice Johnston, of Ferntree Gully, For service to youth activities.
- Kathleen Theresa Judge, of Albert Park. For community service.
- Zygfryd Peter Koziell, of Fitzroy. For service to the Polish community.
- Nance Kroker, of Horsham. For service to women's affairs.
- Dudley McAdie, of Frankston. For municipal service.
- Frederick Hewitt Moreton, of Lake Bolac. For community service.
- Margaret Duart Morrison, of Sale. For service to handicapped children.
- Jack Robinson Oswin, of Cowes. For service to conservation.
- William Frederick Rowe, of Lower Templestowe, For community service.
- Sheilah Aimee Sheldrake, of Black Rock. For service to returned servicemen.
- Jessica Dorothy Simon, of Ballarat. For community service.
- Leila Edith St John, of Glen Iris. For service to the Children's Book Council of Victoria.
- Athelstan Stone, of Elwood. For service to sea scouts.
- Florence Annie Tripcony, of Lake Boga. For service to the Red Cross.
- Norma Cairnes Woodlock, of Seaford. For service to senior citizens.

State of Queensland

- Charles Edward Atkinson, of Palmwoods. For service to the fruit growing-industry.
- Robert James Beak, of Rockhampton. For service to the cattle industry.
- Florence Elsie Bishop, of Wavell Heights. For services to the community.
- Thomas Comerford, of Finch Hatton. For services to the community.
- Matthew Frederick Crozier, of Stafford. For service in the field of fire fighting safety equipment.
- Alan Lewis George Gumming, of North Ipswich. For services to the community.
- Archibald John Hepburn Galloway, of Moorooka, For service to the community.
- Kelvin Warring Geddes, of St Lucia. For services to charity.
- Jean Blyth Scott Hardie, of Highgate Hill. For services in the community.
- Martha Heelan, of Roma. For services to the community.
- Ernest Albert William Logan, of Gordon Park. For service to the community.
- Neville George Parsons, of Stafford. For services to the community.
- Eileen Pearson, of Maleny. For services to the community.
- Sarah Turner, of Duingal. For services to the community.

State of Western Australia

- Marjorie Iris Lawry Archer, of Mount Lawley. For services to the Civil Service Association.
- Jean Margaret Colyer, of Armadale. For services to the community.
- John Martin Forde, of Riverton. For services to the community.
- Olive Rose Galliers, Matron, Armadale-Kelmscott Memorial Hospital.
- Thomas John Gardiner, of Bassendean. For services to the volunteer fire brigade movement.
- Violet May Knowles, of Armadale. For services to the National Trust and the community.
- Frank Grosvenor Newman, of South Coogee. For services to potato marketing.
- Joyce Page, of Floreat Park. For services to the Scouting movement.
- Leslie Brennan Prunster, of Geraldton. For services to the community.
- Charles Australia Punch, of Katanning. For services to the community.
- Nellie Margaret Regan, of Mandurah. For services to the community.
- Florence Mary Teasdale, of Merredin. For services to the community.
- George Archibald Tinling Thomson, of Shenton Park. For services to the community.
- Roma Margaret Waugh, of Falcon. For services to the sick and needy.

=== Royal Victorian Medal (RVM) ===
In Silver

- P1922597 Warrant Officer John Michael Brown, Royal Air Force.
- L0686912 Chief Technician Patrick William Bryan, Royal Air Force.
- Beatrice Gertrude Bryant.
- Leslie Frederick Cribbett.
- Charles Vincent Hampson.
- Divisional Sergeant Major John William Holliday, The Queen's Bodyguard of the Yeomen of the Guard.
- Nellie Rebecca Jolliffe.
- Band Colour Sergeant Malcolm Francis Kennard, Q003562A, Royal Marines.
- Yeoman Bed Goer Robert William Layfield, The Queen's Bodyguard of the Yeomen of the Guard.
- Frederick John Mitchell.
- Raymond Ernest Morrison.
- James Robert Nurse.
- Yeoman Bed Goer Albert Edward Price, MC, The Queen's Bodyguard of the Yeomen of the Guard.
- Yeoman Bed Goer Edwin Richardson, The Queen's Bodyguard of the Yeomen of the Guard.
- Sylvia Joan Robinson.
- Police Constable Alan Smith, Metropolitan Police.
- 295431 Corporal of Horse Geoffrey Arthur Smith, The Life Guards.
- Richard James Thomas.
- Reginald Wilcock.

==== Bar to the Royal Victorian Medal ====
In Silver

- Muriel Alice Tate.

=== Royal Red Cross (RRC) ===
Army

- Lieutenant Colonel Marion Buchanan (482627), Queen Alexandra's Royal Army Nursing Corps, Territorial and Army Volunteer Reserve.
- Lieutenant Colonel Valerie Joy Smith, ARRC, (448376), Queen Alexandra's Royal Army Nursing Corps.
- Lieutenant Colonel Gwenneth Anne Staines, ARRC, (446055), Queen Alexandra's Royal Army Nursing Corps, (now R.A.R.O.).
- Major Agnes Annie Williams, ARRC, (274073), Queen Alexandra's Royal Army Nursing Corps.

==== Associate of the Royal Red Cross (ARRC) ====
Royal Navy

- Lieutenant (SD) Peter Richard Wellings.

Army

- Major Jane Mary Arigho (484286), Queen Alexandra's Royal Army Nursing Corps.
- Major Mary Josephine Clune (455191), Queen Alexandra's Royal Army Nursing Corps.
- Major Jill Margaret Field (454251), Queen Alexandra's Royal Army Nursing Corps.
- Major Betty Doreen Tansley (474346), Queen Alexandra's Royal Army Nursing Corps.
- Captain Raymond Tate (503264), Royal Army Medical Corps.

Royal Air Force

- Acting Wing Officer Zena Mary Cheel (407866), Princess Mary's Royal Air Force Nursing Service.

=== Air Force Cross (AFC) ===
Royal Air Force

- Wing Commander Charles John Thomson (608140).
- Squadron Leader John Lumby Bishop (608621).
- Squadron Leader Jonathan Barratt Hill (608427).
- Squadron Leader Harry Anthony Hynds (1805419).
- Squadron Leader George John McIntosh (2615666).
- Squadron Leader Peter Ted Squire (608512).
- Squadron Leader Christopher John Yeo (4232805), (Retired).
- Flight Lieutenant Nicholas James Brown (4232537).
- Flight Lieutenant Dudley Roger Carvell (608773).
- Flight Lieutenant James William Eyre (4071818).
- Flight Lieutenant Malcolm Jolyon Maclaine (8025478).
- Flight Lieutenant Peter Douglas Scoffham (609489).

=== Queen's Police Medal ===
For Distinguished Service
England and Wales

- Robert Arthur Charles Barker, Deputy Assistant Commissioner, Metropolitan Police.
- John Joseph Buckley, Chief Superintendent, Greater Manchester Police.
- John Cass, Commander, Metropolitan Police.
- William Coates, Chief Superintendent, West Yorkshire Metropolitan Police.
- George Bevan Collins, Commander, Metropolitan Police.
- James Fryer, Deputy Chief Constable, Derbyshire Constabulary.
- William George Lisle, Chief Superintendent, Northumbria Police.
- Peter Marshall, Commissioner of Police, City of London.
- Christopher Herbert Owen, Chief Superintendent, Leicestershire Constabulary.
- William Prankish Charles Rostron, Assistant Chief Constable, Gwent Constabulary.
- Colin Sampson, Deputy Chief Constable, Nottinghamshire Constabulary.
- Kathleen Daphne Skillern, Commander, Metropolitan Police.
- Leonard Albert George Soper, Deputy Chief Constable, Thames Valley Police.
- Cyril David Vaughan, Deputy Chief Constable, Dyfed-Powys Police.

Scotland

- John Ross Little, OBE QGM, Chief Constable, Tayside Police.
- Alexander Graham Lynn, Assistant Chief Constable, Grampian Police.

Guernsey

- Arthur Russell Bailey, Chief Officer, Island Police Force.

Northern Ireland

- Robert James Alexander Andrew Catterson, Chief Inspector, Royal Ulster Constabulary.

Overseas Territories

- Wright Fitz-Henley George, MVO CPM, Commissioner of Police, Royal Antigua Police Force.

Australian States

New South Wales

- Kenneth Maxwell Baret, Superintendent, New South Wales Police Force.
- Bernard Lloyd Brotherson, Superintendent, New South Wales Police Force.
- Ray Surflen Cowden, BEM., Superintendent, New South Wales Police Force.
- Reginald Maxwell Holloway, Superintendent, New South Wales Police Force.
- George William Louis, Inspector, New South Wales Police Force.
- John Colin Perrin, Inspector, New South Wales Police Force.
- Donald Peverley Pratt, Superintendent, New South Wales Police Force.
- Reginald Hugh Stevenson, Inspector, New South Wales Police Force.
- Daryl Raymond Williams, QGM, Superintendent, New South Wales Police Force.

Victoria

- James Patrick Barritt, Sergeant, Victoria Police Force.
- Aubrey William Conn, Deputy Commissioner, Victoria Police Force.
- Mervyn John Fisher, Chief Superintendent, Victoria Police Force.
- Ormond Buckingham Robinson, Chief Superintendent, Victoria Police Force.
- Frederick Wenzel Russell, Superintendent, Victoria Police Force.
- Alan Ernest Scott, Chief Inspector, Victoria Police Force.

Queensland

- John Joseph Cronin, Superintendent, Queensland Police Force.
- Francis Gillick Donaghue, Superintendent of Police, Queensland Police Force.

Western Australia

- William Charles Handmer, Superintendent, Western Australian Police Force.
- Cornelius Lawrence Sullivan, Superintendent, Western Australian Police Force.

=== Queen's Fire Services Medal ===
For Distinguished Service
England and Wales

- Ronald Borrows, Assistant Chief Officer, London Fire Brigade.
- Sidney Rankin, Chief Fire Officer, Merseyside Fire Brigade.
- John Warden, BEM, Chief Fire Officer, Lancashire Fire Brigade.
- Eric Harvey Whitaker, Chief Fire Officer, East Sussex Fire Brigade.
- Herbert Stanley Whittaker, Assistant Chief Officer (Deputy Chief Officer), Greater Manchester Fire Brigade.

Scotland

- Raymond Frederick Holland-Thomas, Firemaster, Dumfries and Galloway Fire Brigade.

Australian States

New South Wales

- Geoffrey Harold Dudman, District Officer, New South Wales Fire Brigade.

Victoria

- Clarence Herbert Howe, Chief Officer, Country Fire Authority.
- Ronald Alexander Orchard, Deputy Chief Officer, Country Fire Authority.

=== Colonial Police Medal ===
For Meritorious Service

- Mohamed Ashraf, Station Sergeant of Police, Royal Hong Kong Police Force.
- Kenneth Aylward, Divisional Officer, Hong Kong Fire Services.
- Man-pan Cheung, Chief Inspector of Police, Royal Hong Kong Auxiliary Police Force.
- Dennis John Collins, Senior Superintendent of Police, Royal Hong Kong Police Force.
- Lennet Maurice Edwards, Inspector of Police, Bermuda Police Force.
- Vallan Gillett, Inspector of Police, Belize Police Force.
- Keith Bernard Hamilton, Inspector of Police, Belize Police Force.
- Michael George Hammett, Chief Superintendent of Police, Royal Hong Kong Police Force.
- Ki-on Hui, Senior Superintendent of Police, Royal Hong Kong Police Force.
- Hoi-fung Kong, Senior Fireman, Hong Kong Fire Services.
- Kwong-ming Lee, Chief Inspector of Police, Royal Hong Kong Auxiliary Police Force.
- King-chi Leung, Principal Fireman, Hong Kong Fire Services.
- Kam-po Li, Chief Inspector of Police, Royal Hong Kong Police Force.
- Ching-po Lui, Superintendent of Police, Royal Hong Kong Auxiliary Police Force.
- Ka-kwong Luk, Station Sergeant of Police, Royal Hong Kong Police Force.
- Robert Lewis John Macdonald, Senior Superintendent of Police, Royal Hong Kong Police Force.
- Brian Leonard Merritt, Superintendent of Police, Royal Hong Kong Police Force.
- Ernest Moniz, Chief Inspector of Police, Bermuda Police Force.
- Kiriata Tokiauea, Assistant Superintendent of Police, Gilbert Islands Police Force.
- Fat-hung Tsang, Chief Inspector of Police, Royal Hong Kong Police Force.
- Brian Webster, Senior Superintendent of Police, Royal Hong Kong Police Force.
- Roy Albert Wheatley, Divisional Officer, Hong Kong Fire Services.
- Cheung Wong, Sergeant of Police, Royal Hong Kong Police Force.

=== Queen's Commendation for Valuable Service in the Air ===
Royal Navy

- Lieutenant Ian Robin MacDonald Bradshaw.

Royal Air Force

- Squadron Leader Eric Henry Dunn (4233130).
- Squadron Leader Michael Graham Head (608101).
- Squadron Leader Peter George Hopwood (4232035).
- Squadron Leader Martin Albert Molloy (5200407).
- Squadron Leader Terence Victor Rogers (4231759).
- Squadron Leader James Leslie Uprichard (2619087).
- Squadron Leader David George Miller Wright (1608638).
- Flight Lieutenant John Baxter Abell (4230490).
- Flight Lieutenant David Hugh Clark (4231031).
- Flight Lieutenant Derek James Cox (4085249).
- Flight Lieutenant John Reginald James Froud (3512190).
- Flight Lieutenant Alan John Laidler (4231962).
- Flight Lieutenant Paul Victor Lloyd (5202682).
- Flight Lieutenant Alan Pengelly (684061).
- Flight Lieutenant Michael John Phillips (507893).
- Flight Lieutenant William Forbes Charles Tyndall (685982).
- Flight Lieutenant Peter John Veal (607872).
- Flight Lieutenant Malcolm Graham Forrester White (8025932).
- E1947163 Flight Sergeant Roger Harold Lynn.

United Kingdom

- Kenneth Wilfred Armstrong, DFC, Flight Navigation Superintendent, VC10/TriStar, British Airways.
- Alan Rutherford Whitfield, Chief Training Captain, Loganair Ltd.

== Australia ==
=== Knight Bachelor ===
- Emeritus Professor Geoffrey Malcolm Badger, AO, of North Adelaide, South Australia. For distinguished service to science and education.
- The Honourable Walter Angus Bethune, of Ouse, Tasmania. For distinguished parliamentary service.
- The Honourable Thomas Charles Drake-Brockman, DFC, of Lesmurdie, Western Australia. For distinguished parliamentary service.
- The Honourable Mr Justice Walter Benjamin Campbell, of Clayfield, Queensland. For distinguished service to government, law and education.
- Max Dillon, of Pymble, New South Wales. For distinguished service to commerce and industry.
- Nicholas Laurantus, MBE, of Sydney, New South Wales. For distinguished service to the community.
- Eric Herbert Pearce, OBE, of Toorak, Victoria. For distinguished service to the community.
- Geoffrey John Yeend, CBE, of Yarralumla, Australian Capital Territory. For distinguished public service.

=== Order of the Bath ===
==== Companion of the Order of the Bath (CB) ====
Civil Division

- Duncan Robert Steele Craik, OBE, of Manuka, Australian Capital Territory. For outstanding public service.
- Laurence John Daniels, OBE, of Forrest, Australian Capital Territory. For outstanding public service.
- Dr. Gwyn Howells, of Deakin, Australian Capital Territory. For outstanding public service.

=== Order of Saint Michael and Saint George ===
==== Companion of the Order of St Michael and St George (CMG) ====
- Professor Arthur John Birch, of Yarralumla, Australian Capital Territory. For service to science.
- The Honourable Leslie Harry Ernest Bury, of Vaucluse, New South Wales. For parliamentary service.
- The Honourable John Leslie Stuart MacFarlane, MLA, of Via Katherine, Northern Territory. For parliamentary service and service to primary industry.

=== Order of the British Empire ===
==== Dame Commander of the Order of the British Empire (DBE) ====
Civil Division

- Mary Valerie Hall Austin, OBE, of Mortlake, Victoria. For distinguished service to the community.
- Sister Mary Phillipa (Josephine Brazill), of East Melbourne, Victoria. For distinguished service to the community.

==== Commander of the Order of the British Empire (CBE) ====
Civil Division

- Professor Wilfred David Borrie, OBE, of Deakin, Australian Capital Territory. For service to social science.
- Douglas Squire Irving Burrows, MBE, of St. Ives, New South Wales. For service to children's health.
- Emeritus Professor Colin Malcolm Donald, of Myrtle Bank, South Australia. For service to agricultural science.
- Dorothy Edna Annie Edwards, OBE, of Launceston, Tasmania. For service to the community.
- Percival Crawford Murray, of Clifton Gardens, New South Wales. For service to industry.
- Donald Neil Symons, of Warrnambool, Victoria. For service to industry and to the community.
- Albert Joseph Teal, of Brighton, Victoria. For service to industry and to the community.
- Dr. James Geoffrey Toakley, of Brisbane, Queensland. For service to medicine and to handicapped children.

==== Officer of the Order of the British Empire (OBE) ====
Civil Division

- Allen James Aylett, of Moonee Ponds, Victoria. For service to the sport of Australian Rules Football.
- Frederick Henry Brooks, ISO, of Malvern, Victoria. For service to the welfare of disadvantaged children.
- Ita Clare Buttrose, of Woollahra, New South Wales. For service to journalism.
- Iris Anna Cameron, of Launceston, Tasmania. For service to the community.
- Professor Enid Mona Campbell, of East Oakleigh, Victoria. For service in education in the field of law.
- William Harold Clough, of Nedlands, Western Australia. For service to civil engineering.
- John Cornelius Conway, of Deakin, Australian Capital Territory. For public service.
- Henry Charles Foletta, of Lower Plenty, Victoria. For service to the textile industry.
- Patrick Galvin, of Brighton, South Australia. For parliamentary service, service to trade unionism and to sport.
- The Right Reverend Kenneth Joseph Gardner, of Macgregor, Queensland. For service to religion.
- Thomas Walter Hardy, of Seacliff, South Australia. For service to the wine industry.
- Andrew Osborne Hay, of South Yarra, Victoria. For public service.
- Vernon Victor Hickman, of New Town, Tasmania. For service to the zoological sciences and to education.
- The Honourable William Clark Hofeman, QC MLC, of Kingston, Tasmania. For community services.
- Robert William Holberton, of New York, U.S.A. For public service.
- Ronald Kilpatrick Hunter, of Moree, New South Wales. For service to primary industry.
- Kenneth Ross Ingram, of Forrest, Australian Capital Territory. For public service.
- Harold Rupert Irving, of Mosman, New South Wales. For service to commerce and accounting.
- The Reverend Dr. Percy Jones, MBE, of Airey's Inlet, Victoria. For service to music.
- Campbell Wright Le Page, of Lindfield, New South Wales. For service to the insurance industry.
- Malcolm Elliot Lyon, of Yarralumla, Australian Capital Territory. For public service.
- William Robert Smith MacRae, of Darling Point, New South Wales. For service to the textile industry.
- Wandjuk Djuwakan Marika, of Yirrkala, Northern Territory. For service to the arts.
- Robert Paddon, of Brighton, Victoria. For service to automotive manufacturing and export industries.
- Irwin Prowse, of Farrer, Australian Capital Territory. For public service.
- Raymonde Edith Read, of Killarney Heights, New South Wales. For service to the Girl Guides Association.
- Dr. Raymond George Rokeby Robinson, of Longueville, New South Wales. For service to health.
- John Kingsley Taylor, of Highgate, South Australia. For public service in the field of soil sciences.
- Peter Taylor, of Beaumont, South Australia. For service to the community and the disadvantaged.

==== Member of the Order of the British Empire (MBE) ====
Military Division

Royal Australian Navy

- Lieutenant Commander Francis David Gunst, O.2575.
- Lieutenant Commander Linwood Clarence Parker Smith, C.60929.
- Lieutenant Commander Frank Dennis Watton, O.106932.

Australian Army

- Major James Andrew Cruickshank, 310131, Royal Australian Infantry.
- Captain Arthur Foxley, 53235, Royal Australian Infantry.
- Major Albert Andrew Haberley, 21453, Royal Australian Infantry.
- Major John Patrick Power, 15833, Royal Australian Electrical and Mechanical Engineers.
- Major Allan Peter Thorp, 216737, Royal Australian Engineers.

Royal Australian Air Force

- Squadron Leader William Kelvin Brammer, AE, 016141.
- Squadron Leader Neville James Conn, 0315437.
- Squadron Leader Barrie John Miller, 0118057.
- Flight Lieutenant Alan Patrick Worthington, 017357.

Civil Division

- Leonard Charles Abbott, of Berrigan, New South Wales. For service to the community.
- Lance Colin Armstrong, of Oberon, New South Wales. For service to local government.
- Edvins Baulis, of Trevallyn, Tasmania. For service to migrants.
- William Gordon Blair, of Lismore, New South Wales. For service to local government and the community.
- Sister Mary Borgia (McNamara), of Subiaco, Western Australia. For service to health.
- Hallam Chesney Broe, of Auburn, New South Wales. For service to civil aviation.
- Raymond Bruce Carter, of Oatley, New South Wales. For service to youth.
- Gordon Noel Chamberlain, of Curtin, Australian Capital Territory. For public service.
- Dr. Clifford Stirling Colvin, of Orange, New South Wales. For service to medicine.
- Donald Austin Cooper, of Port Fairy, Victoria. For service to the community.
- Seth David Cottell, of Bundaberg, Queensland. For service to health.
- Mabel Patricia Daw, of Nedlands, Western Australia. For public service.
- Enoe Maria Di Stefano, of Strathfield, New South Wales. For service to migrant welfare.
- William James Dowling, of Reservoir, Victoria. For public service.
- Vera Jean Eagle, of Drummoyne, New South Wales. For service to children's welfare.
- Roy Douglas Filleul, of Burnie, Tasmania. For service to local government and the community.
- Frank Eric Freeman, MVO, of Gymea Bay, New South Wales. For public service.
- Adel Olga Friman, of Darwin, Northern Territory. For public service.
- Kenneth Prosser Grayling, of Wattle Park, South Australia. For service to the sport of rugby union.
- The Reverend Maxwell John Lewis Griffiths, of St. Ives Chase, New South Wales. For service to religion.
- Ethel Hoskins Hayton, JP, of Wollongong, New South Wales. For service to the community.
- Edward Johnson, of Warrnambool, Victoria. For service to the community.
- George Henry Kirby, of Hamilton, Queensland. For service to the community.
- Patricia Mary Lance, of Manly, New South Wales. For service to health.
- Daniel Thomas Lattin, of Burwood, Victoria. For public service.
- The Reverend Frederick Percival McMaster, ED, of Holder, Australian Capital Territory. For service to religion.
- Derrick Edward Styles Mathews, of Colac, Victoria. For service to the community.
- Marie Clare Maunder, JP, of Boggabri, New South Wales. For service to women and the community.
- Robert Peter Maxwell, of Ipswich, Queensland. For service to the community.
- Wilbur Keith Moon, of Glenelg East, South Australia. For service to health insurance.
- Ralph Allister Mortimer, of Point Clare, New South Wales. For service to the community.
- Bert Newton, of Richmond, Victoria. For service to the performing arts.
- Thomas Myles O'Donnell, of South Wahroonga, New South Wales. For service to medical technology.
- Colin Lindsay Palmer, of North Avoca, New South Wales. For service to the performing arts and the community.
- Sister Mary Patrick (Carter), of Waitara, New South Wales. For service to health.
- John Andrew Pattison, of Mentone, Victoria. For public service.
- James William Harold Pearce, of Elwood, Victoria. For public service.
- Bonnie Anne Quintal, of Norfolk Island. For service to health and the community.
- Henry Ross Rayner, MVO, of Campbell, Australian Capital Territory. For public service.
- Kerry Reid, of Surrey Hills, Victoria. For service to the sport of tennis.
- Luigi Ruffino, of Alice Springs, Northern Territory. For service to the community.
- Francis Henry Ruler, of Kyabram, Victoria. For service to youth.
- Francis Keith Smyth, of Bedford, Western Australia. For public service.
- Lisle John Treblico, of Griffith, Australian Capital Territory. For service to the community.
- Ronald Stewart Tudor, of North Balwyn, Victoria. For service to the recording industry.
- Victor Tuting, of Taroona, Tasmania. For service to the sport of soccer.
- Dr. Luke Everard Verco, of Jamestown, South Australia. For service to medicine.
- Ross Leslie Walker, of Hackett, Australian Capital Territory. For service to the community.
- Margaret Jean Warland, of Burwood, Victoria. For service to children's welfare.
- Sister Mary Sheila White, of Fullarton, South Australia. For service to nursing and the community.

=== Companion of the Imperial Service Order (ISO) ===
- Frank Ellis Gare, of Shelley, Western Australia. For public service in the field of Aboriginal affairs.

=== British Empire Medal (BEM) ===
Military Division

Royal Australian Navy

- Chief Petty Officer Keith Robert Freemantle, R59198.
- Chief Petty Officer Donald William Milford, R57781.

Australian Army

- Warrant Officer Class Two John Charles Dodd, 39380, Royal Australian Infantry.
- Staff Sergeant Lyndon Donald Easton, 1900329, Royal Australian Army Ordnance Corps.
- Sergeant Rosemary Margaret Foxe, F55266, Women's Royal Australian Army Corps.
- Staff Sergeant Douglas Gordon Henderson, 21650, Royal Australian Army Ordnance Corps.
- Sergeant Robert Ian Maclean, 517502, Royal Australian Infantry.
- Staff Sergeant Lawrence George Smith Son, 1200535, Royal Australian Infantry.

Royal Australian Air Force

- Flight Sergeant Barteld Valom, A55534.
- Flight Sergeant Kevin Charles Wendt, A19925.
- Flight Sergeant Richard Noel Wills, A16926.
- Flight Sergeant Frank Roland Willson, A225396.

Civil Division

- Wallace Sproule Alexander, of Lockhart, New South Wales. For service to the community.
- Edith Marian Anderson, of Young, New South Wales. For service to the community and the arts.
- Topsy Beer, of Coonabarabran, New South Wales. For service to the community and youth.
- Phyllis May Best, of Kingsford, New South Wales. For public service.
- Lorna Ethyl Breaden, of Brunswick, Victoria. For public service.
- George William Carver, of Miranda, New South Wales. For service to veterans and the community.
- Sheila Maria Conway, of Centennial Park, New South Wales. For public service.
- Eva Coutts, of Lillimur, Victoria. For service to the community.
- Anthony Dennis Duffy, of Rivett, Australian Capital Territory. For service to sport.
- Edgar Hardy Enscoe, of Merino, Victoria, for service to fire safety.
- Max Francis Fendler, of Largs Bay, South Australia. For service to veterans.
- Francis William Gomm, of Albany, Western Australia. For service to veterans.
- Valmae Gordon, of Coonalpyn, South Australia. For service to the community.
- Herbert Percival Gridley, of West Coburg, Victoria. For public service.
- William Kingston Hampson, of Clovelly, New South Wales. For service to the community and the aged.
- Dorothea Isabel Henslowe, of Battery Point, Tasmania. For service to local tourism and to the community.
- Geoffrey Morris Jones, of Eltham, Victoria. For service to fire safety. (To be dated 5 February 1979.)
- Lawrence Julius, of Highett, Victoria. For public service.
- Ronald Gaius King, of Victoria Point, Queensland. For public service.
- Betty Virginia Lamond, of Weston, Australian Capital Territory. For public service.
- Jessie Elizabeth Leonard, of Ainslie, Australian Capital Territory. For service to the visually handicapped.
- John James Michael Lillis, of Bondi, New South Wales. For service to the community.
- Florence Alma Littlejohn, of Red Hill, Victoria. For service to the community.
- The Reverend Father John Luemmen, of Rossmoyne, Western Australia. For service to Aboriginal and migrant welfare.
- Joseph Francis McCaffrey, of Strathfield, New South Wales. For service to youth and amateur athletics.
- Lucinda McLean, of Condobolin, New South Wales. For service to the community.
- Flight Lieutenant Jonathan Joseph New, of Toowoomba, Queensland. For service to youth.
- Nina May Nottage, of Newtown, Tasmania. For service to the handicapped.
- Mary Marguerite Partridge, of Nowendoc, New South Wales. For service to the community.
- Robert Scott, of West Ryde, New South Wales. For service to museums.
- Laurie May Shiels, of Berfigan, New South Wales. For service to the community.
- Charles William Smith, of Hornsby Heights, New South Wales. For service to the aged and the community.
- Doris Enid Smith, of Murrurundi, New South Wales. For service to the community.
- Stanley Trevaskus Terrell, of Chigwell, Tasmania. For service to the community and the aged.
- Kenneth Barry Thomson, of Duranillin, Western Australia. For public service.
- Henry Albert Vaughan, of Hamilton, Victoria. For service to the community and fire safety.
- Pearl Ann Watts, of Essendon, Victoria. For public service.
- Roy Douglas Weller, of Gayndah, Queensland. For service to local government and the community.

=== Royal Red Cross (RRC) ===
==== Associate of the Royal Red Cross (ARRC) ====
- Major Lorna Margaret Finnie, F25384, Royal Australian Army Nursing Corps.
- Squadron Leader Margaret Doreen Morrissy, N117928, Royal Australian Air Force Nursing Service.

=== Air Force Cross (AFC) ===
Australian Army

- Captain Trevor Jeffrey Hay, 222078, Australian Army Aviation Corps.

Royal Australian Air Force

- Wing Commander Bruce George Grayson, 018745.
- Flight Lieutenant Desmond Colin Long, 045768.
- Flight Lieutenant Terence John Marker, 683310, Royal Air Force.
- Wing Commander Thomas William O'Brien, 018403.
- Flight Lieutenant Jeffrey Philip Trappett, 0117198.

=== Queen's Commendation for Valuable Service in the Air ===
Royal Australian Air Force

- Flight Lieutenant Michael Brendon Birks, 0224235.
- Flight Lieutenant Alwyn Thomas Blyth, 016941.
- Squadron Leader Joseph James Wilson, 0220792.

=== Queen's Police Medal ===
For Distinguished Service

- Gordon Law Bruce, Chief Superintendent, Commonwealth Police.
- Robert Henry Gillespie, Superintendent, Commonwealth Police.
- John Rowe, Sergeant, Northern Territory Police.
- Bruce Watt, Inspector, Northern Territory Police.

== Barbados ==
=== Knight Bachelor ===
- Carlisle Archibald Burton, OBE, Head of the Civil Service.
- The Honourable Fabriciano Alexander Hoyos. For his contribution to the heritage of Barbados as an author of the local history.

== Mauritius ==
=== Order of the British Empire ===
==== Commander of the Order of the British Empire (CBE) ====
Civil Division

- Ramnarain Seeruttun. For services to the planting community.
- Rene Sow Choung Seeyave. For services in the field of industrial development.

==== Officer of the Order of the British Empire (OBE) ====
Civil Division

- Joseph Claude Arnold Delaitre, lately Divisional Scientific Officer, Animal Husbandry, Ministry of Agriculture and Natural Resources.
- Beejmohunsing Jomadar, lately Social Welfare Commissioner, Social Welfare Division, Ministry of Social Security.

==== Member of the Order of the British Empire (MBE) ====
Civil Division

- Roger Clency Gobindram. For services in the propagation of local folklore.
- Henri Tonta, lately Principal Nursing Officer, Ministry of Health.

=== Mauritius Police Medal ===
- Inspector Manicum Adiapen.
- Superintendent Louis Serge D'Avoine.
- Assistant Superintendent Sheik Ishack Hossein Ally.
- Superintendent Bhimsen Kowlessur.
- Superintendent Assoon Leve Hang.
- Assistant Commissioner Soadick Ameen Maudarbocus, BEM.
- Chief Inspector Michel Davis Savy.
- Assistant Superintendent Joseph Hedley Tranquille.

== Fiji ==
=== Order of Saint Michael and Saint George ===
==== Companion of the Order of St Michael and St George (CMG) ====
- Mosese Qionibaravi, Speaker of the House of Representatives.

=== Order of the British Empire ===
==== Knight Commander of the Order of the British Empire (KBE) ====
Civil Division

- Charles Alexander Stinson, OBE, recently Minister of Finance.

==== Commander of the Order of the British Empire (CBE) ====
Civil Division

- Joseph David Gibson, High Commissioner for Fiji in London.

==== Officer of the Order of the British Empire (OBE) ====
Civil Division

- George Murray Mackenzie, Deputy Secretary for Finance (Budget).

==== Member of the Order of the British Empire (MBE) ====
Military Division

- Warrant Officer Class I, Silivenusi Waqausa, Royal Fiji Military Forces.

Civil Division

- Ratu Tevita Naulivou. For his services as a high Chief and to the community.
- Soma Raju. For services to farming and the community.
- Philip Snow. For services to Fiji cricket.

=== Queen's Police Medal ===
For Distinguished Service

- John Eric Orme, Commissioner, Royal Fiji Police.

== Bahamas ==
=== Order of the British Empire ===
==== Dame Commander of the Order of the British Empire (DBE) ====
Civil Division

- Dr. The Honourable Doris Louise Sands Johnson, President of the Senate.

==== Officer of the Order of the British Empire (OBE) ====
Civil Division

- Charles Mennon Harris, Postmaster-General.

==== Member of the Order of the British Empire (MBE) ====
Civil Division

- John Arthur Chipman. For services in the field of entertainment.
- Hesketh Allan Cuthbert Johnson. For services as a community worker.
- Holman McDonald. For services as a civic leader in the community.

=== British Empire Medal (BEM) ===
Civil Division

- Aaron Ferguson. For services as a religious worker.
- The Reverend Adolphus Emmanuel Green. For services as a community and a church leader.
- Rudolph Wilton Hanna. For services as a nursing officer.
- George Edwin Johnson. For services as a church and community leader.
- Lydia King, Mrs. Rolle. For services as a nursing officer.
- William Sturrup. For services to the community and sport.
- Elliott Thompson, Chief Fire Officer, Civil Aviation Department.

== Papua New Guinea ==
=== Knight Bachelor ===
- The Honourable Pita Lus, OBE MP, Minister for Commerce.

=== Order of Saint Michael and Saint George ===
==== Companion of the Order of St Michael and St George (CMG) ====
- Rabbie Langanai Namaliu, Chairman of the Public Services Commission.

=== Order of the British Empire ===
==== Commander of the Order of the British Empire (CBE) ====
Civil Division

- Eva Standen. For services to religion and the community.

==== Officer of the Order of the British Empire (OBE) ====
Civil Division

- William Penias Tiden, QPM, Commissioner, Royal Papua New Guinea Constabulary.
- Lepani Kaiwakalu Watson. For services to the community.

==== Member of the Order of the British Empire (MBE) ====
Military Division

Papua New Guinea Defence Force

- Warrant Officer Kamawawa Monakakalu.
- Warrant Officer Class 2 John James Stone (Australian Army Catering Corps).
- Squadron Leader Geoffrey Graeme Wood (Royal Australian Air Force).

Civil Division

- John Elmer. For services to commerce.
- Stewart Parks Pili Nikints, Sub-Inspector, Royal Papua New Guinea Constabulary.
- Albert Speer. For services to public health.
- Eunice Merle Wall. For services to the community.

=== Companion of the Imperial Service Order (ISO) ===
- Keith William Dyer, Co-ordinator, Purari Hydro-Electricity Scheme, Department of Minerals and Energy.

=== British Empire Medal (BEM) ===
Military Division

Papua New Guinea Defence Force

- Corporal (Provisional Sergeant) Tom Gula.
- Corporal Rova Iru.
- Corporal Andova Kanama.
- Sergeant (Provisional Warrant Officer) Woronai Karake.
- Sergeant Zariba Sanai.

Civil Division

- Marie Teresa Andrews. For public service.
- Kagl Di. For public service.
- Lofty, Senior Sergeant, Royal Papua New Guinea Constabulary.
- Rei Mou. For services as a government driver.
- Norah Henao Onzem. For services to education.
- Cecil Rogegea, Sub-Inspector, Royal Papua New Guinea Constabulary.
- Tape, Sergeant Major, Royal Papua New Guinea Constabulary.

=== Queen's Police Medal ===
For Distinguished Service

- Henry Tokam, Assistant Commissioner, Royal Papua New Guinea Constabulary.
- Michael Roderick Vee, Assistant Commissioner, Royal Papua New Guinea Constabulary.

== Solomon Islands ==
=== Order of the British Empire ===
==== Knight Commander of the Order of the British Empire (KBE) ====
Civil Division

- Jacob Vouza, MBE GM. For outstanding services to his country and local community.

==== Commander of the Order of the British Empire (CBE) ====
Civil Division

- Francis Bugotu, Secretary for Foreign Affairs Department.

==== Officer of the Order of the British Empire (OBE) ====
Civil Division

- Paul Herbert Brown. For service to commerce, aviation and tourism.
- Daniel Maeke, Permanent Secretary, Ministry of Education and Training.

==== Member of the Order of the British Empire (MBE) ====
Civil Division

- The Reverend Bill Gina. For services to the church and community.
- Francis Reginald Kikolo, Minister of Home Affairs.
- The Reverend Edmond Kiva. For services to his church and community.
- The Very Reverend Father Cyril Bernard O'Grady, OP. For services to his church and to education.
- Deni Tuni, Seismological Observer, Ministry of Natural Resources.

=== British Empire Medal (BEM) ===
Civil Division

- Mathew Natei, Master-at-Arms, Marine Division, Ministry of Transport and Communications.
- Emu Pina, lately Acting Senior Accountant, Ministry of Home Affairs.
- George Tupulo. For services to the community.

== Tuvalu ==
=== Order of the British Empire ===
==== Officer of the Order of the British Empire (OBE) ====
Civil Division

- Ionatana Ionatana, CPM, Secretary to Government.

==== Member of the Order of the British Empire (MBE) ====
Civil Division

- The Reverend Morikao Kaua. For services to the Tuvalu church, government and people.
- Kitiseni Lopati, Secretary, Communications and Transport.

== Saint Lucia ==
=== Knight Bachelor ===
- Keith Lyndell Gordon, CMG, Chairman of the Public Service Board of Appeal.

=== Order of Saint Michael and Saint George ===
==== Companion of the Order of St Michael and St George (CMG) ====
- Claudius Cornelius Thomas, High Commissioner for Saint Lucia and Commissioner for the Eastern Caribbean Commission in London.

=== Order of the British Empire ===
==== Officer of the Order of the British Empire (OBE) ====
Civil Division

- Julian Robert Hunte. For services to the community and his contribution in the realm of cricket.

==== Member of the Order of the British Empire (MBE) ====
Civil Division

- Denise Denis, JP. For services to the community and education.
- Robert Joseph Devaux. For his contribution towards preserving the heritage of Saint Lucians.
- Carlos Mynns, CPM, Superintendent (Director of Music), Royal Saint Lucia Police Force.

=== British Empire Medal (BEM) ===
Civil Division

- Anthony Joseph Edward Lacan, lately Inspector of Postmen, General Post Office.
- Rachael Volney, recently Attendant, Golden Hope Mental Hospital.

== See also ==
- 1979 Prime Minister's Resignation Honours
