= Ronald Radford =

Ronald Radford may refer to:

- Ron Radford (born 1949), Australian curator
- Ronald Radford (civil servant) (1916–1995), English civil servant
- Ronald Radford (guitarist), American guitar player
- Ronnie Radford (1943–2022), English footballer
