= James Crombie (civil servant) =

Sir James Ian Cormack Crombie, KCB, KBE, CMG (1902–1969) was an English civil servant. Having served in the War Office, HM Treasury, the Ministry of Food and the Foreign Office, he concluded his career as Chairman of the Board of Customs and Excise from 1955 to 1962 and, simultaneously, Chairman of the Civil Service Sports Council from 1959 to 1962.

Government offices
Preceded by Sir William Croft	Chairman of the Board of Customs and Excise; 1955–1962	Succeeded by Sir John Anderson
