= Alan Collinge =

English cricketer and Royal Air Force officer (1935–2025)

Personal information
- Full name: Rex Alan Collinge
- Born: 23 April 1935; Nottingham, Nottinghamshire, England
- Died: 12 July 2025 (aged 90); Bournemouth, Dorset, England
- Batting: Right-handed
- Bowling: Right-arm fast-medium

Domestic team information
- Years: Team
- 1955–1962: Suffolk

Career statistics
Competition	First-class
Matches	2
Runs scored	101
Batting average	25.25
100s/50s	–/–
Top score	41
Balls bowled	419
Wickets	11
Bowling average	16.90
5 wickets in innings	1
10 wickets in match	–
Best bowling	6/52
Catches/stumpings	2/–
- Source: Cricinfo, 8 March 2019

Rex Alan Collinge MBE (23 April 1935 – 12 July 2025) was an English first-class cricketer and Royal Air Force officer. Collinge served in the Royal Air Force from 1954 to 1985, rising to the rank of wing commander and being made an MBE in the 1979 Birthday Honours. He also played first-class cricket for the Combined Services cricket team.

== Biography ==
Collinge was born in Nottingham on 23 April 1935. He was educated at Bedford School, where he played for the school cricket team in 1951–52. His batting was described in 1951 as showing "much promise". After completing his education, Collinge carried out his National Service in the Royal Air Force, with him being commissioned as a pilot officer in 1954. He relinquished his commission on the National Service List when he was appointed to a short service commission in September 1955.

He debuted in minor counties cricket for Suffolk in 1955, an association he would maintain until 1962, having made twelve appearances in the Minor Counties Championship. He was promoted to the rank of flying officer in June 1956, with promotion to flight lieutenant coming in April 1960. He made his debut in first-class cricket for the Combined Services cricket team against Cambridge University at Fenner's in 1962, taking a five wicket haul on debut when he took 6 for 52 in the Cambridge first-innings. He made a further first-class appearance for the Combined Services in 1962, against Ireland at Belfast. He scored a total of 101 runs in these matches, with a high score of 41, while with the ball he took 11 wickets at an average of 16.90.

He was promoted to squadron leader in July 1969. He was mentioned in dispatches in December 1973 for his service in Northern Ireland. He was made an MBE in the 1979 Birthday Honours. He was promoted to wing commander the following month. Collinge retired from active service at his own request in July 1985.

Collinge died on 12 July 2025, at the age of 90.
