= Jean McFarlane, Baroness McFarlane of Llandaff =

British nurse, writer and life peer (1926–2012)

The Right Honourable The Baroness McFarlane of Llandaff MCSP

Member of the House of Lords
- Lord Temporal
- Life peerage 30 July 1979 – 13 May 2012

Personal details
- Born: 1 April 1926 Cardiff, Wales
- Died: 13 May 2012 (aged 86)
- Party: None (crossbencher)

Jean Kennedy McFarlane, Baroness McFarlane of Llandaff, FRCN, MCSP (1 April 1926 – 13 May 2012), was a British nurse and member of the House of Lords.

== Biography ==
McFarlane was born in Cardiff, Wales, and later trained as a nurse, a midwife, and as a health visitor before going on to pursue a successful career in nursing teaching and administration. She studied sociology at Bedford College, London. In the 1960s she participated in the Royal College of Nursing research programme "Study of Nursing Care". In 1974 she became the holder of the first Chair of Nursing at an English university (the University of Manchester) and held it until 1989.

McFarlane served on the Royal Commission on the National Health Service, 1976–79 (Chairman: Sir Alec Merrison).

A committed Christian, she served as a member of the general synod of the Church of England 1990–1994.

== House of Lords ==
McFarlane was created a life peer in the House of Lords as Baroness McFarlane of Llandaff, of Llandaff in the County of South Glamorgan on 30 July 1979, in the Queen's Birthday Honours list.

McFarlane was a member of four select committees of the House of Lords. As well as being a Vice President of the League of Nurses of St Bartholomew's Hospital. In 1976 she was made a Fellow of the Royal College of Nursing. She was a trustee of numerous charities. In 2005, she was awarded the British Journal of Nursing's Lifetime Achievement Award.

== Legacy ==
In 2009, a new building of the University of Manchester was named the Jean McFarlane Building. Situated to the east of University Place, it is one of many completed during that period.

== Publications ==
Baroness McFarlane was the author of a number of studies, notably A Guide to the Practice of Nursing Using the Nursing Process, 1982.
