= Louis Petch =

English civil servant (1913–1981)

Sir Louis Petch, KCB (16 August 1913 – 29 March 1981) was an English civil servant. Educated at Peterhouse, Cambridge, he entered the civil service in 1937 and moved to the Treasury in 1945, becoming Second Secretary in 1966. He was Second Permanent Secretary of the Civil Service Department from 1968 to 1969, chairman of the Board of Customs and Excise from 1969 to 1973, and chairman of the Parole Board from 1974 to 1979.

Government offices
Preceded by none	Second Permanent Secretary of the Civil Service Department; 1968–1969	Succeeded by Sir Philip Rogers
Preceded by Sir Wilfred Morton	Chairman of the Board of Customs and Excise; 1969–1973	Succeeded by Sir Ronald Radford
