= Joan Moriarty =

British nursing administrator (1923–2020)

- Born: 11 May 1923
- Died: 19 July 2020 (aged 97)
- Military career
- Allegiance: United Kingdom
- Branch: British Army
- Rank: Brigadier
- Commands: Queen Alexandra's Royal Army Nursing Corps (1977–1981)
- Awards: Companion of the Order of the Bath; Royal Red Cross

Brigadier Joan Olivia Elsie Moriarty, CB, RRC, QHNS (11 May 1923 – 19 July 2020) was a British military nurse and nursing administrator who served as Matron-in-Chief/Director of the Queen Alexandra's Royal Army Nursing Corps from 1977 to 1981. She was decorated with the Royal Red Cross in the 1977 New Year Honours, and made a Companion of the Order of the Bath in the 1979 Birthday Honours.

She died on 19 July 2020 at the age of 97.
