= Wilfred Morton =

Scottish civil servant (1906–1981)

Sir William Wilfred Morton, KCB (1906 – 7 January 1981) was a Scottish civil servant. Educated at the University of Glasgow, he entered the civil service as an official in the Inland Revenue in 1927. He became a Commissioner of Inland Revenue in 1955, before serving in HM Treasury from 1958 to 1965, when he was appointed Chairman of the Board of Customs and Excise, retiring in 1969.

Government offices
Preceded by Sir John Anderson	Chairman of the Board of Customs and Excise; 1965–1969	Succeeded by Sir Louis Petch
