= John Anderson (civil servant) =

Scottish civil servant

Sir John Anderson, KBE, CB (12 March 1908 – 27 January 1965) was a Scottish civil servant. Educated at Christ Church, Oxford, he entered the civil service as an official in the Scottish Office in 1931. He was Deputy Secretary of the Scottish Home Department from 1953 to 1956, Secretary of the Department of Health for Scotland from 1956 to 1959, Secretary of the Scottish Home Department from 1959 to 1962 and then Secretary of the Scottish Home and Health Department from 1962 to 1963. From 1963 to his death in 1965, he was Chairman of the Board of Customs and Excise.

Government offices
| Preceded by Sir James Crombie | Chairman of the Board of Customs and Excise; 1963–1965 | Succeeded by Sir Wilfred Morton |
