= William Croft (civil servant) =

English civil servant (1892–1964)

Sir William Dawson Croft, KCB, KBE, CIE, CVO (16 August 1892 – 18 August 1964) was an English civil servant. Educated at Winchester College and Trinity College, Oxford, he entered the civil service as an administrative official in the India Office in 1919; he served as private secretary to three secretaries of state, from 1931 to 1936 and was then deputy secretary from 1941 to 1947. He was Chairman of the Board of Customs and Excise from 1947 to 1955, after which he chaired the commission recommending trade and tariff policy ahead of the establishment of the West Indies Federation in 1958.

Government offices
Preceded by Sir Archibald Carter	Chairman of the Board of Customs and Excise; 1947–1955	Succeeded by Sir James Crombie
