= Philip Rogers (civil servant) =

English civil servant (1914–1990)

Sir Philip Rogers, GCB, CMG (19 August 1914 - 24 May 1990) was an English civil servant. Educated at Emmanuel College, Cambridge, he entered the civil service as an official in the Colonial Office; he moved to the Department of Technical Co-operation in 1961, moving to the Cabinet Office in 1964 and HM Treasury in 1968, becoming Second Permanent Secretary of the Civil Service Department from 1969. He was then Permanent Secretary of the Department of Health and Social Security from 1970 to 1975, overseeing major reforms to the National Health Service. In retirement, he chaired the Universities Superannuation Scheme and the London School of Hygiene and Tropical Medicine, and was president of the council of the University of Reading.

Government offices
Preceded by Sir Louis Petch	Second Permanent Secretary of the Civil Service Department; 1969–1970	Succeeded by Sir David Pitblado
