= Douglas Lovelock =

English civil servant (1923–2014)

Sir Douglas Arthur Lovelock, KCB (7 September 1923 – 30 July 2014), was an English civil servant and Church of England asset manager. He entered the civil service in 1949 and served as Chairman of the Board of Customs and Excise from 1978 to 1983 and as First Church Estates Commissioner from 1983 to 1993. From 1983 to 1992, he was also the leader of the Central Board of Finance of the Church of England.

Controversies were attracted when a £500m fall in value emerged in the Church of England's property portfolio between 1989 and 1990, owing to the decision to put money into commercial property investments in the mid-1980s before the market sunk and interest rates rose.

Government offices
Preceded by Sir Ronald Radford	Chairman of the Board of Customs and Excise; 1978–1983	Succeeded by Sir Angus Fraser
