= Ronald Radford (civil servant) =

Sir Ronald Walter Radford, KCB, MBE (28 February 1916 – 3 September 1995) was an English civil servant. Educated at St John's College, Cambridge, he entered the Indian Civil Service in 1939 and remained there until Indian Independence in 1947. He then entered HM Customs and Excise as an assistant principal. Promoted to be a Commissioner of Customs and Excise in 1965, he was chairman of the board from 1973 to 1977. He was then secretary-general of the Customs Cooperation Council from 1978 to 1983.

Government offices
Preceded by Sir Louis Petch	Chairman of the Board of Customs and Excise; 1973–1977	Succeeded by Sir Douglas Lovelock
