= Kenneth Couzens =

English civil servant

Sir Kenneth Edward Couzens, KCB (29 May 1925 – 4 August 2004) was an English civil servant. Educated at the Portsmouth Grammar School and Gonville and Caius College, Cambridge, he entered the Inland Revenue in 1949. In 1951, he moved to HM Treasury, where he was private secretary to the Financial Secretary from 1952 to 1955 and private secretary to the Chief Secretary from 1962 to 1963. He moved to the Civil Service Department in 1968 and returned to HM Treasury in 1970; he was deputy secretary with responsibility for incomes policy and public finance from 1973 to 1976 and Second Permanent Secretary with responsibility for overseas finance from 1977 to 1982. He was then Permanent Secretary of the Department of Energy from 1983 to 1985. He was deputy chairman of the National Coal Board from 1985 to 1988 and a director of Crédit Lyonnais Capital Markets from 1989, serving as its chairman from 1991 to 1996.
