= Rachel Roxburgh =

Australian artist, historian and activist

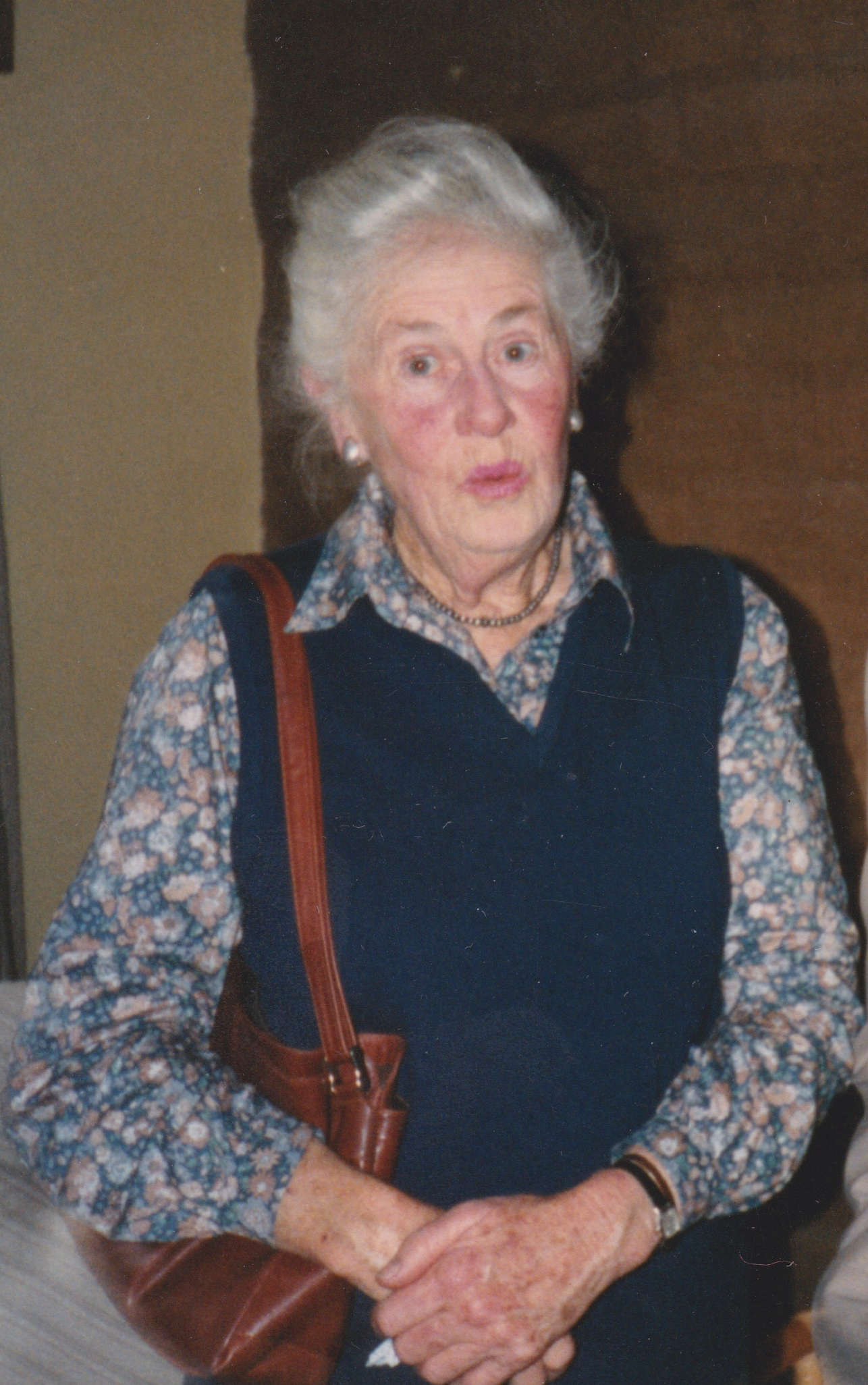
- Born: 21 September 1915; Point Piper
- Died: 13 April 1991 (aged 75); Castle Hill
- Alma mater: Ascham School; National Art School
- Occupation: Artist, educator, conservationist
- Awards: British Empire Medal (1979)

Rachel Mary Roxburgh BEM (21 September 1915 – 13 April 1991) was an Australian artist, potter, colonial historian and environmental activist.

== Early life and education ==
Roxburgh was born like her parents in Sydney, Australia. She was born in Point Piper on 21 September 1915. Her parents were Norah Marjorie (born Carleton) and John Norton Roxburgh. She attended Ascham School and the East Sydney Technical College, where she received Grade A (over 83%) for both the Introductory Art Course in 1932 and the Intermediate Course in 1933. She then attended the Adelaide Perry Art School in Sydney.

== Awards and legacy ==
Roxburgh received a British Empire Medal in 1979 for services to the community.

A 1939 portrait of Roxburgh by Adelaide Perry is held in the National Portrait Gallery of Australia.

The Art Gallery of New South Wales holds 21 boxes of papers relating to Roxburgh's work as a painter and potter, including extensive personal correspondence from 1945 to 1990, diaries, sketchbooks, newspaper cuttings and exhibition catalogues.

One folio package and 19 boxes of her extensive research into the history of colonial buildings about which she wrote, correspondence and family papers all gathered between 1960 and 1986 are held by the National Library of Australia.

The National Trust held a Retrospective Exhibition of her paintings, pottery, books, photographs and memorabilia at Cooma Cottage, Yass and Riversdale, Goulburn in May–June 1993.

== Works ==
=== Books ===
- History of Riversdale, Goulburn, The National Trust of Australia New South Wales, 1970
- Early Colonial Houses of New South Wales, Ure Smith, 1974, ISBN 0725401737
- Colonial Farm Buildings of New South Wales, Rigby, 1978, ISBN 072700445X
- Berrima Court House, Berrima Court House Trust, 1981, ISBN 0959346805
- Throsby Park: An account of the Throsby Family in Australia 1802-1840, NSW National Parks & Wildlife Service, 1989

=== Articles ===
- "Thomas Potter Macqueen of Segenhoe", Royal Historical Society Journal, vol. 58, pt. 3 September 1972

== Death ==
Roxburgh died on 13 April 1991 at Castle Hill, New South Wales.
