= Stephen Miller (surgeon) =

Surgeon

Sir Stephen James Hamilton Miller, KCVO, GCStJ, FRCS (1915–1996) was a Scottish ophthalmic surgeon. He was Surgeon-Oculist to the Queen from 1974 to 1980.

== Early life, education and military career ==
Born on 19 July 1915 in Arbroath, Miller was the son of an engineer. He studied at the University of Aberdeen, graduating with his medicine and surgery degrees in 1937. He then undertook house appointments, including one in ophthalmology in Hull. At the outbreak of the Second World War, he was commissioned as a surgeon-lieutenant in the Royal Naval Volunteer Reserve. After three years, he was appointed ophthalmic specialist at the Royal Navy's hospital in Kilmacolm. He completed the Diploma of Ophthalmic Surgery and Medicine in 1944. He was subsequently posted to Malta, before leaving the armed forces in 1946.

== Surgeon ==
After a short spell in the Glasgow Eye Infirmary in 1946, Miller was appointed a consultant ophthalmic surgeon at the Hull Royal Infirmary, but soon resigned when promised equipment and buildings did not materialise. He was appointed registrar at Moorfields Eye Hospital in 1947 (where he remained until 1950); in 1948, he was elected a fellow of the Royal College of Surgeons. He was also employed as a registrar at St George's Hospital, London, from 1949 where he was promoted to Ophthalmic Surgeon in 1951 (remaining there until 1980); alongside this appointment, he was Ophthalmic Surgeon at the National Hospital, Queen's Square, from 1955 to 1978 and a Surgeon at Moorfields Eye Hospital from 1954 to 1980. At the latter, he created London's first glaucoma unit. He authored Modern Trends in Ophthalmology (1973), Operative Surgery (1976), the 16th (1978), 17th (1984) and 18th (1990) editions of Parsons' Diseases of the Eye, and Clinical Ophthalmology for the Post-Graduate (1987).

Miller was appointed Surgeon Oculist to the Royal Household in 1965 (in the same year also being appointed Ophthalmic Surgeon at King Edward VII's Hospital). He was promoted to be Surgeon-Oculist to the Queen in 1974. In 1979, he was appointed a Knight Commander of the Royal Victorian Order, and in 1980 left his royal office and retired from the NHS. From 1980 to 1990, he was Hospitaller of the St John Ophthalmic Hospital in Jerusalem (he was made a Commander of the Order in 1962, a Knight of Grace in 1978 and Bailiff Grand Cross in 1987). He died on 12 April 1996.
