= Daphne Skillern =

British Metropolitan Police chief officer

Commander Daphne Skillern QPM

Head of C1 Department, Metropolitan Police
- In office August 1977 – 1980

Head of CO Branch, Metropolitan Police
- In office 1974 – August 1977

Personal details
- Born: Kathleen Daphne Skillern; 29 November 1927
- Died: 20 October 2012 (aged 84)

Kathleen Daphne Skillern QPM (29 November 1927 – 20 October 2012) was a British police officer. She was the second woman to hold the rank of commander in the London Metropolitan Police (after Shirley Becke) and the first woman to head a branch at Scotland Yard apart from A4 (Women Police), which was disbanded in 1973; in 1974 she took command of CO (Commissioner's Office) Branch, responsible for research and personnel.

Skillern spent most of her career as a detective in the Criminal Investigation Department. She was promoted to commander on 29 April 1974. In August 1977 she was transferred to head the C1 Department of CID, which included the Obscene Publications Squad, the first woman to head this department. She was awarded the Queen's Police Medal (QPM) in the 1979 Birthday Honours and retired in 1980.

== Footnotes ==
Police appointments
Preceded by Unknown	Commander, CO Branch, Metropolitan Police; 1974–1977	Succeeded by Unknown
Preceded by Kenneth Hannam	Commander, C1 Department, Metropolitan Police; 1977–1980	Succeeded by Pat Carson
