= Antoni Gościński =

Polish medic

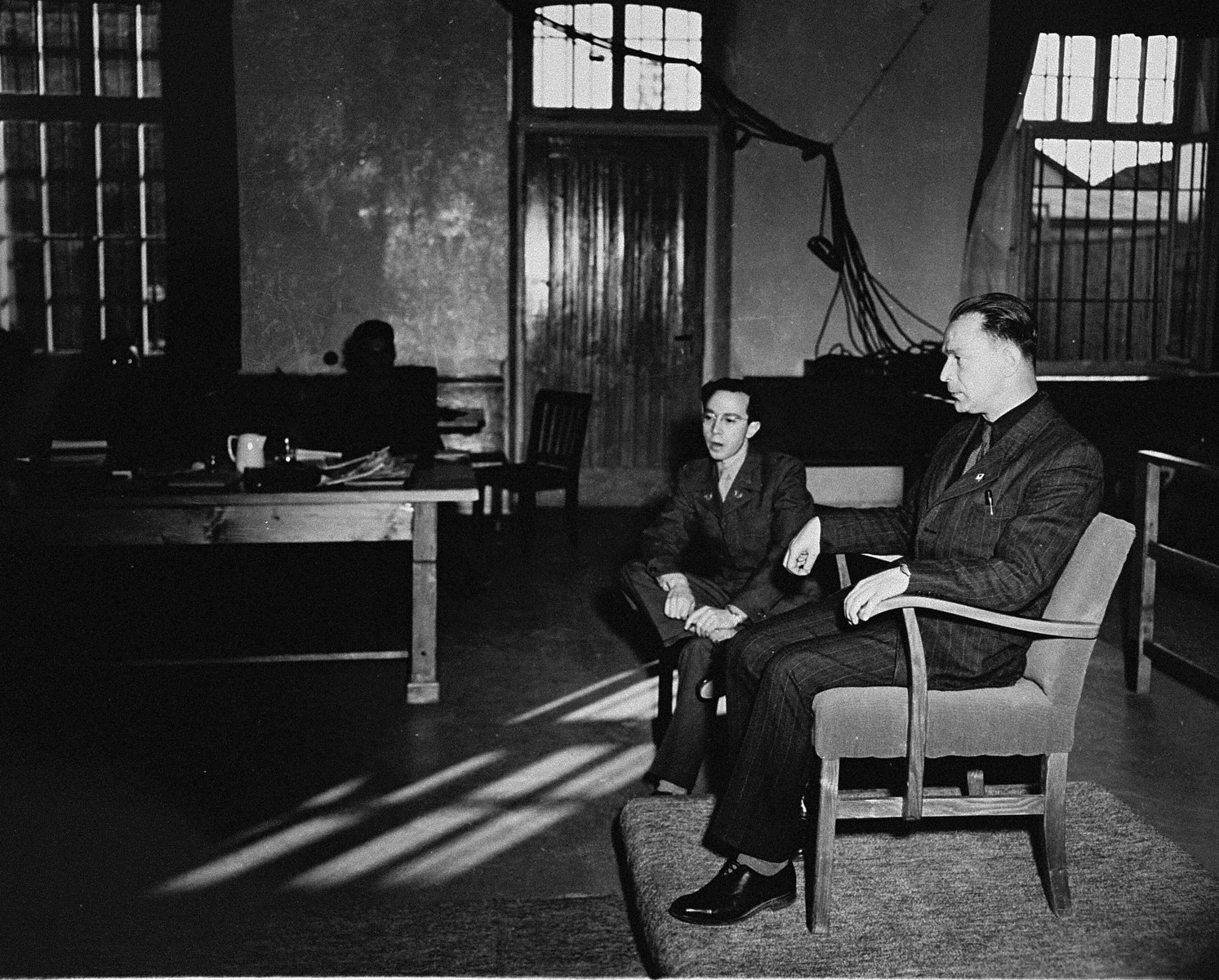
Dr. Goscinski testifying at the trial of 61 former camp personnel and prisoners from Mauthausen.

Antoni Gościński OBE (4 January 1909 in Poznań – 12 December 1986 in Belize) was a Polish medic. During the World War II he was arrested by the Germans in the course of the AB Action and imprisoned in Dachau concentration camp and later in Gusen I concentration camp (Mauthausen). There he became one of the leading doctors in the revier and a member of the inmates' underground trying to help the sick and wounded prisoners. He also documented German war crimes committed in the camp.
