= List of ambassadors of the United Kingdom to Nicaragua =

The ambassador of the United Kingdom to the Republic of Nicaragua is the United Kingdom's foremost diplomatic representative in Nicaragua, and in charge of the UK's diplomatic mission in Managua.

Until 1945, UK envoys to Guatemala were also accredited to Nicaragua (see List of ambassadors of the United Kingdom to Guatemala), but there were occasionally consular representatives in the country. From 1976 to 1991 and 2004 to 2011 the ambassador to Costa Rica was also accredited to Nicaragua. From 2011 to 2015 the UK had a separate ambassador to Nicaragua, although he was resident in Costa Rica (he was married to the ambassador to Costa Rica). From 2015 the ambassador to Costa Rica is again also accredited to Nicaragua.

== List of heads of mission ==
=== Consular representatives before 1945 ===
- 1876- : Alexander Gollan

=== Envoys extraordinary and ministers plenipotentiary ===
- 1945–1948: Archibald Robertson
- 1948–1952: Nigel Steward
- 1952–1953: Hubert Evans

=== Ambassadors extraordinary and plenipotentiary ===
- 1953–1954: Hubert Evans
- 1954–1959: Horace Gates
- 1959–1961: William Massey
- 1961–1963: Patrick Johnston
- 1963–1967: Roger Pinsent
- 1967–1970: George Warr
- 1970–1973: Ivor Vincent
- 1974–1976: David Duncan
- 1976–1979: Keith Hamylton Jones (non-resident)
- 1979–1982: Michael Brown (non-resident)
- 1982–1986: Peter Summerscale (non-resident)
- 1986–1989: Michael Daly (non-resident)
- 1989–1991: William Marsden (non-resident)
- 1991–1992: Roger Brown
- 1992–1997: John Culver
- 1997–2000: Roy Osborne
- 2000–2002: Harry Wiles
- 2002–2004: Tim Brownbill
- 2004–2006: Georgina Butler (non-resident)
- 2006–2011: Thomas Kennedy (non-resident)
- 2011–2015: Chris Campbell (non-resident)
- 2015–?: Ross Denny (non-resident)
- Present: Ben Lyster-Binns
