= List of ambassadors of the United Kingdom to Afghanistan =

His Majesty’s Ambassador to Afghanistan
- Royal Arms of His Majesty's Government
- Incumbent; Robert Chatterton Dickson (non-resident chargé d’affaires) since July 2023
- Foreign, Commonwealth and Development Office
- Style: His Excellency; Ambassador
- Reports to: Secretary of State for Foreign, Commonwealth and Development Affairs
- Appointer: The Crown on advice of the prime minister
- Term length: At His Majesty's pleasure
- Inaugural holder: Sir Francis Humphrys; First Envoy Extraordinary to Afghanistan; Sir Giles Squire; First Ambassador to Afghanistan
- Formation: 1922
- Website: British Embassy Kabul

The ambassador of the United Kingdom to Afghanistan is the United Kingdom's foremost diplomatic representative in Afghanistan, and head of the UK's diplomatic mission in Kabul. The official title is His Britannic Majesty's Ambassador to the Islamic Republic of Afghanistan.

The Treaty of Rawalpindi of 1921 provided for the exchange of diplomatic representatives between the two countries. Until 1948 the British ministers in Kabul were members of the Indian Political Service, appointed by the Foreign Office.

== List of heads of mission ==
=== Envoys extraordinary and ministers plenipotentiary ===
- 1922–1929: Sir Francis Humphrys
- 1929–1935: Sir Richard Maconachie
- 1935–1941: Sir William Fraser-Tytler
- 1941–1943: Sir Francis Wylie
- 1943–1948: Sir Giles Squire

=== Ambassadors extraordinary and plenipotentiary ===
- 1948–1949: Sir Giles Squire
- 1949–1951: Sir John Gardener
- 1951–1953: Eric Lingeman
- 1953–1957: Sir Daniel Lascelles
- 1957–1963: Sir Michael Gillett
- 1963–1965: Sir Arthur de la Mare
- 1965–1968: Sir Gordon Whitteridge
- 1968–1972: Peers Lee Carter
- 1972–1976: John Drinkall
- 1976–1979: Kenneth Crook
- 1979–1980: Norman Hillier-Fry
- 1981–1984: John Garner (chargé d'affaires – no ambassador after the beginning of the Soviet–Afghan War)
- 1984–1987: Charles Drace-Francis (chargé d'affaires)
- 1987–1989: Ian Mackley (chargé d'affaires)
- 1989–2000: No representation
- 2001–2002: Stephen Evans (chargé d'affaires)
- 2002–2003: Ronald Nash
- 2003–2006: Dame Rosalind Marsden
- 2006–2007: Stephen Evans
- 2007–2009: Sir Sherard Cowper-Coles
- 2009–2010: Sir Mark Sedwill
- 2010–2012: Sir William Patey
- 2012–2015: Sir Richard Stagg
- 2015–2016: Dame Karen Pierce
- 2016–2017: Dominic Jermey
- 2017–2018: Sir Nicholas Kay
- 2018–2019: Giles Lever (chargé d'affaires)
- 2019–2021: Alison Blake
- June-November 2021: Sir Laurie Bristow
- 2021-2022: Martin Longden (non-resident chargé d’affaires based at the British Embassy in Doha following the fall of Kabul).
- 2022-2023: Hugo Shorter (non-resident chargé d’affaires based at the British Embassy in Doha).
- 2023-2025: Robert Chatterton Dickson (non-resident chargé d’affaires based at the British Embassy in Doha)

== See also ==
- Embassy of the United Kingdom, Kabul
