= List of ambassadors of the United Kingdom to Haiti =

The ambassador of the United Kingdom to Haiti is the United Kingdom's foremost diplomatic representative to the Republic of Haiti.

From 1913 to 1922, the head of mission in Cuba also served Haiti. The British Embassy in Port-au-Prince was closed in 1966 "for reasons of economy" and the high commissioner to Jamaica in Kingston was appointed non-resident ambassador to Haiti. Responsibility for Haiti was transferred to the ambassador to the Dominican Republic in 1999. In June 2012 the British Foreign Secretary announced that the UK was to open a new embassy in Haiti. The new embassy was opened in June 2013, but until 2015 the ambassador to the Dominican Republic remained ambassador to Haiti, with a deputy head of mission in Port-au-Prince. In 2015 a new, dedicated ambassador was appointed to Haiti, but still non-resident (she was married to the ambassador to the Dominican Republic and resided in Santo Domingo). From 2019 until 2024, Mockbul Ali OBE served as both Ambassador to the Dominican Republic and non-resident Ambassador to Haiti.

== List of heads of mission ==
=== Consuls-general to the Republic of Hayti ===
- ? –1859: Thomas Ussher

=== Chargé d'affaires and consuls-general to the Republic of Hayti ===
- 1859–1861: Thomas Ussher
- 1861–1872: Spenser St. John

=== Ministers resident and consuls-general to the Republic of Hayti ===
- 1872–1874: Spenser St. John
- 1874–1883: Robert Stuart

=== Consuls-general for the Republic of Hayti and its dependencies ===
- 1912–1913: Arthur Nightingale

=== Ministers plenipotentiary to the Republic of Hayti ===
- 1913–1919: Stephen Leech
- 1919–1921: William Erskine

=== Consuls-general to the Republic of Hayti ===
- 1921–1922: Godfrey Haggard
- 1922-1925 : John Eric Maclean Carvell
- 1929-1931: John Hall Magowan

=== Consuls for the Republic of Hayti ===
- 1935–1938 Francis M. Shepherd
- 1938–1939: William R. Mackness
- 1939–1943: Reginald A.N. Hillyer
- 1943–1946: Alan A.L. Tuson
- 1946–1950: Augustus C. Routh
- 1950–1955: David J. Mill Irving

=== Ambassadors extraordinary and plenipotentiary at Port-au-Prince, and consuls-general for the Republic of Hayti ===
- 1955–1959: Sidney Simmonds
- 1960–1962: Gerard T. Corley Smith

=== Consul for the Republic of Haiti ===
- 1962–1963: Henry Niblock

=== Ambassadors extraordinary and plenipotentiary at Haiti ===
- 1966–1970: Dalton Murray CMG
- 1970–1973: Sir Nick Larmour KCMG
- 1973–1976: John Hennings CMG
- 1976–1981: John Drinkall CMG
- 1982–1984: Barry Smallman CMG CVO
- 1984–1987: Sir Martin Reid KBE CMG
- 1987–1989: Alan Payne CMG
- 1989–1995: Derek Milton CMG
- 1995–1999: Richard Thomas CMG
- 1999–2002: David Gordon Ward
- 2002–2006: Andrew Richard Ashcroft
- 2006–2009: Ian Alan Worthington
- 2009–2015: Steven Fisher
- 2015–2020: Sharon Campbell
- 2020-2024: Mockbul Ali OBE
- 2024–present: Guy Janes (Deputy Head of Mission)
