= John Hennings (diplomat) =

British diplomat (1922–1985)

John Dunn Hennings CMG

High Commissioner of the United Kingdom to Singapore
- In office 1978–1982
- Preceded by: Peter Tripp
- Succeeded by: Peter Moon

High Commissioner of the United Kingdom to Jamaica
- In office 1973–1976
- Preceded by: Noel Larmour
- Succeeded by: John Drinkall

Personal details
- Born: 9 June 1922
- Died: 7 October 1985 (aged 63)
- Children: 2
- Education: University College, Oxford
- Occupation: Diplomat

John Dunn Hennings (9 June 1922 – 7 October 1985) was a British diplomat who served as High Commissioner of the United Kingdom to Jamaica from 1973 to 1976 and High Commissioner of the United Kingdom to Singapore from 1978 to 1982.

== Early life and education ==
Hennings was born on 9 June 1922, the eldest son of Stanley John and Grace Beatrice Hennings. He was educated at Ipswich School and University College, Oxford.

== Career ==
Hennings served with the RAF (1942–1945). After the War, he entered the Foreign Office and served in Berlin (1947–1949). He was at the Colonial Office (1949–1953), and served on the British Guiana Constitutional Commission (1951). He was Secretary of the West African Inter-Territorial Secretariat in Accra (1953–1955), and then returned to the Colonial Office (1955–1960). He was Attaché for Colonial Affairs at the British Embassy in Washington, D.C. (1960–1963). He then served at the Commonwealth Relations Office as Head of Development Policy and West and East African Economic Development (1963–1966).

Hennings was head of the residual staff at the British High Commission in Salisbury, Rhodesia (1966–1968). This was the period of the illegal regime headed by Ian Smith following Rhodesia's Unilateral Declaration of Independence. Hennings's position was challenging as he sought to uphold British interests while not giving any recognition to the breakaway colony. According to The Times: "He was regarded with great suspicion by many Rhodesians, and came under attack for passing on information about conditions there." After the completion of his posting in 1968 he was awarded the CMG.

Hennings was Counsellor and Head of Chancery at the High Commission in Delhi (1968–1972) and Acting High Commissioner to Uganda (1972). He was then High Commissioner to Jamaica, and Ambassador (non-resident) to Haiti (1973–1976). He was Assistant Under Secretary of State at the Foreign and Commonwealth Office (1976–1978). His final posting was High Commissioner to Singapore (1978–1982).

== Personal life and death ==
Hennings married Joanna Reed in 1953 and they had two sons.

Hennings died on 7 October 1985, aged 63.

== Honours ==
Hennings was appointed Companion of the Order of St Michael and St George (CMG) in the 1968 Birthday Honours.

Diplomatic posts
Preceded by Peter Tripp	High Commissioner of the United Kingdom to Singapore; 1978–1982	Succeeded by Peter Moon
Preceded by Noel Larmour	High Commissioner of the United Kingdom to Jamaica; 1973–1976	Succeeded by John Drinkall
