= Martin Reid (diplomat) =

British diplomat (1928–2006)

Sir Martin Reid KBE CMG

High Commissioner of the United Kingdom to Jamaica
- In office 1984–1987
- Preceded by: Barry Smallman
- Succeeded by: Alan Payne

Personal details
- Born: 27 August 1928
- Died: 20 June 2006 (aged 77)
- Children: 4
- Education: Brasenose College, Oxford
- Occupation: Diplomat

Sir Harold Martin Smith Reid (27 August 1928 – 20 June 2006) was a British diplomat who served as high commissioner to Jamaica from 1984 to 1987.

== Early life and education ==
Reid was born on 27 August 1928, the son of Marcus Reid and Winifred Mary Reid (née Stephens). He was educated at Merchant Taylors' School and then, after National Service in the Royal Navy, at Brasenose College, Oxford where he read Greats.

== Career ==
Reid entered the Foreign Service in 1953, and in the following year was posted to Paris where he remained until 1957. After serving in Rangoon from 1958 to 1961, he spent four years at the Foreign Office. From 1965 to 1968, he was at Georgetown, Guyana, as deputy high commissioner, and then from 1968 to 1970 at Bucharest.

From 1970 to 1973, he was deputy high commissioner in Malawi. After briefly serving as private secretary to the Secretary of State for Northern Ireland, he was appointed head of the Central and Southern Africa department at the Foreign and Commonwealth Office, a post he held from 1974 to 1978. He then served as minister at Pretoria and Cape Town in South Africa from 1979 to 1982. During his eight years in Africa, he played a leading role in the development of southern Africa, and, according to the Times, "built up an unrivalled knowledge of the southern Africa region's politics and diplomacy."

In 1984, he was appointed high commissioner to Jamaica and non-resident ambassador to Haiti, posts he held until his retirement in 1987.

== Personal life and death ==
Reid married Jane Elizabeth Harwood in 1956, and they had a son and three daughters.

Reid died on 20 June 2006, aged 77.

== Honours ==
Reid was appointed Companion of the Order of St Michael and St George (CMG) in the 1978 New Year Honours. He was appointed Knight Commander of the Order of the British Empire (KBE) in the 1987 Birthday Honours.

== See also ==
- Jamaica–United Kingdom relations
- Haiti–United Kingdom relations

Diplomatic posts
Preceded by Barry Smallman	High Commissioner of the United Kingdom to Jamaica; 1984–1987	Succeeded by Alan Payne
