= Haiti–United Kingdom relations =

- Haiti: United Kingdom

Haiti–United Kingdom relations refers to the international relations between Haiti and the United Kingdom. The Embassy of the United Kingdom in Port-au-Prince is accredited to Haiti, as is the British Embassy and Ambassador in Santo Domingo, Dominican Republic, while Haiti has an embassy in London and a consulates-general in Providenciales in Turks and Caicos Islands. While the two countries have maintained formal diplomatic recognition since 1859, the United Kingdom has maintained de facto diplomatic relations since Haiti's independence in 1804. The two countries maintain a maritime border between Haiti and the British-governed Turks and Caicos Islands.

== History ==
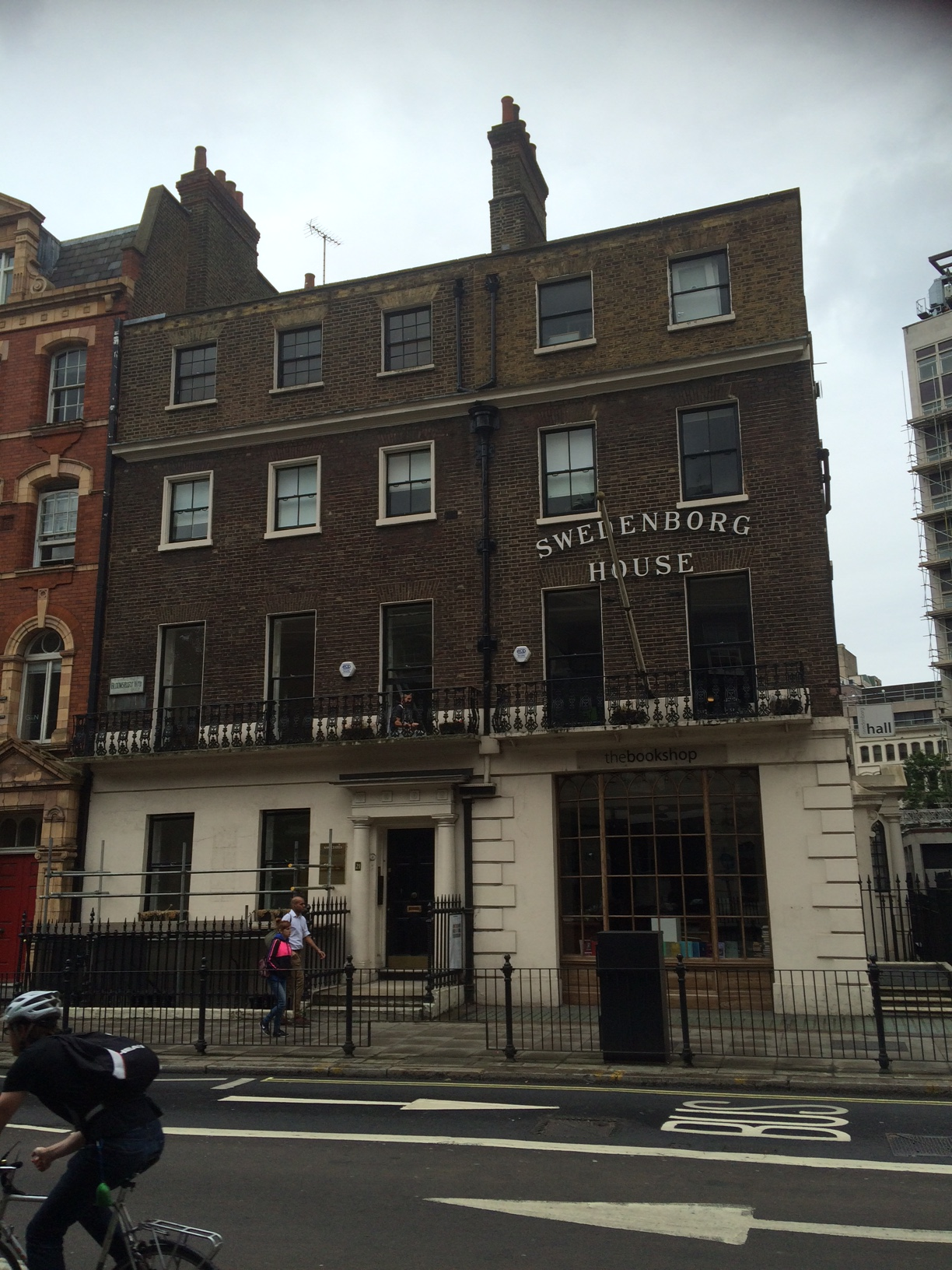
Embassy of Haiti in London.

=== Haitian Revolution ===
Following Revolutionary France's declaration on war on Britain in 1793, Royalist colonists from across the French West Indies, including Saint-Domingue, signed the Whitehall Accord with the British government. The accord stipulated that French Royalists in the West Indies would assist the British in occupying their colonies to prevent them from coming under the new French regime's control and that slavery would continue to be legal in the occupied colonies. British Prime Minister William Pitt the Younger, aware of the enormous revenues Saint-Domingue generated for France, sent an expeditionary force to capture the colony in 1793. He also planned on using the colony as a bargaining chip in future peace negotiations with France. The British government would send less trained adolescents to maintain strong regiments. The incompetence of the new soldiers, combined with the ravaging of disease upon the army, led to a very unsuccessful campaign in Saint-Domingue.

The British were unable to make headway and found themselves contained to the southern portion of the colony by Black troops in French service. The American journalist James Perry notes that the great irony of the British campaign in Saint-Domingue was that it ended as a complete debacle, costing the British treasury millions of pounds and the British military thousands upon thousands of dead, all for nothing. On 31 August 1798, Maitland and Toussaint signed an agreement whereby in exchange for the British pulling out of all of Saint-Domingue, Toussaint promised to avoid supporting unrest in British colonies. Eventually, after the arrest and deportation of Toussaint, the British allied with the Haitian revolutionaries and enacted a naval blockade on the French forces. Dessalines led the Haitian revolution until its completion, when the French forces were finally defeated in 1803.

=== Post-revolution ===
After the assassination of Dessalines, the country spiraled into civil war, and both Alexandre Pétion and Henri Christophe submitted rival treaty proposals in 1807 to the British government to gain diplomatic recognition and economic relations. Through English abolitionist Thomas Clarkson, Christophe was able to make an agreement with Britain that Haiti would not threaten its Caribbean colonies; in return the Royal Navy would warn Haiti of imminent attacks from French troops. Christophe also provided British merchants lower import duties, during the 1814–1815 Congress of Vienna, which Britain was a party to, the French inserted a secret clause during the negotiations allowing them to by "whatever means possible, including that of arms... recover Saint-Domingue or to bring the population of that colony to order". While most independent European nations, their colonies and the United States prohibited trade with Haiti, the British carried out formal trade relations with Haiti throughout the earlier 19th century.

Haiti and the United Kingdom formally established diplomatic relations on 13 May 1859, with the United Kingdom becoming the second country after France to recognize Haiti as an independent, sovereign country. Thomas Neville Ussher was appointed as the first British Chargé d'Affaires and Consul General to Haiti.

== See also ==
- Action of 3 February 1812
- List of ambassadors of the United Kingdom to Haiti
- list of ambassadors of Haiti to the United Kingdom

== Sources ==
- Perry, James (2005). Arrogant Armies: Great Military Disasters and the Generals Behind Them. Edison: CastleBooks.
