= Stansel =

Stansel is a surname. Notable people with the name include:

- Dwight Stansel (born 1947), American politician
- Horace Stansel (1888–1936), American civil engineer and politician
- Raymond Grady Stansel, American drug smuggler
- Valentin Stansel (1621–1705), Czech Jesuit astronomer

== See also ==
- John Stansel Taylor, American politician, citrus grower, and businessman
- Damus–Kaye–Stansel procedure, is a cardiovascular surgical procedure used as part of the repair of some congenital heart defects
- Stansell
- Stanzel
