= List of ambassadors of the United Kingdom to the Dominican Republic =

The ambassador of the United Kingdom to the Dominican Republic is the United Kingdom's foremost diplomatic representative to the Dominican Republic.

From 1999 to 2015 the holder was also ambassador to the Republic of Haiti. In June 2012 the British Foreign Secretary announced that the UK was to open a new embassy in Haiti. In 2015 Sharon Isabel Campbell was appointed as dedicated ambassador to Haiti, but still to be non-resident, since she is married to the ambassador to the Dominican Republic, Christopher John Campbell. In 2020, Mockbul Ali was appointed as both the ambassador to the Dominican Republic and non-resident ambassador to Haiti. Carol van der Walt succeeded him in November 2024 as ambassador but only accredited to the Dominican Republic.

== List of heads of mission ==
=== Chargé d’affaires ===
- 1871–1874: Spenser St. John
- 1874–1883: Major Robert Stuart
- There was no diplomatic agent there from 1883 until 1913

=== Ministers plenipotentiary ===
- 1913–1916: Stephen Leech
- Military Government proclaimed by US Officers, 1916
- 1919–1921: William Erskine

=== Chargé d’Affaires ===
- 1921–1923: Claude Kirwood Ledger
- 1923–1925: Ralph Darrell Wilson
- 1925–1929: John Bowering
- 1929–1930: Wilfred Hansford Gallienne
- 1930–1932: Robert George Goldie
- 1932–1935: Harold Ernest Slaymaker

=== Ministers resident and consul ===
- 1943–1945: Cyril Frank Wilton Andrews

=== Envoys extraordinary and ministers plenipotentiary ===
- 1945–1948: Russell Duncan Macrae
- 1948–1951: Stanley Herbert Gudgeon

=== Ambassadors extraordinary and plenipotentiary ===
- 1951–1953: Stanley Herbert Gudgeon
- 1953–1955: Herbert Gybbon-Monypenny
- 1955–1958: Thomas Corney Ravensdale
- 1958–1962: Wilfrid Wolters McVittie
- 1962–1965: Stephen Alexander Lockhart
- 1965–1969: Ian Wright Bell
- 1969–1972: Leslie Boas
- 1972–1976: Paul Victor St. John Killick
- 1976–1979: Clement Spearman
- 1979–1983: Michael Cafferty
- 1983–1985: Roy George Marlow
- 1985–1988: Michael Newington (non-resident, combined with Venezuela)
- 1988–1993: Giles FitzHerbert (non-resident, combined with Venezuela)
- 1993–1995: John Gerrard Flynn (non-resident, combined with Venezuela)
- 1995–1998: Dick Thomson
- 1998–2002: David Gordon Ward
- 2002–2006: Andrew Richard Ashcroft
- 2006–2009: Ian Alan Worthington
- 2009–2015: Steven Fisher
- 2015-2020: Chris Campbell
- 2020–2024: Mockbul Ali
- 2024–present: Carol van der Walt
