= List of ambassadors of the United Kingdom to Costa Rica =

The ambassador of the United Kingdom to Costa Rica is the United Kingdom's foremost diplomatic representative in Costa Rica, and in charge of the UK's diplomatic mission in San José.

== Heads of mission ==
The Republic of Costa Rica proclaimed its independence in 1838. The United Kingdom was represented intermittently by chargés d'affaires until 1884, and from then until 1908 by ministers based in Guatemala. From 1908 until 1945 the Minister to Panama was also non-resident Minister to Costa Rica.

=== Early diplomats ===
- 1849 and 1850-1852: Frederick Chatfield Chargé d'Affaires

=== Envoys extraordinary and ministers plenipotentiary ===
- 1945–1948: Frederick Coultas
- 1948–1951: Bernard Sullivan
- 1951–1952: Henry Livingston
- 1953–1956: Clarence Ezard

=== Ambassadors extraordinary and plenipotentiary ===
- 1956: Clarence Ezard
- 1956–1961: David Mill Irving
- 1961–1967: Frederic Garner
- 1968–1972: Ian Hurrell
- 1972–1974: John Blackwell
- 1974–1979: Keith Hamylton Jones
- 1979–1982: Michael Brown
- 1982–1986: Peter Summerscale
- 1986–1989: Michael Daly
- 1989–1992: William Marsden
- 1992–1995: Louise Croll
- 1995–1997: Mike Jackson
- 1997–1999: Alan Green
- 1999–2002: Peter Spiceley
- 2002–2006: Georgina Butler
- 2006–2011: Thomas Kennedy
- 2011–2015: Sharon Campbell
- 2015–2020: Ross Denny
- 2020–present: Ben Lyster-Binns
