= David Duncan =

David or Dave Duncan may refer to:

== Arts and entertainment ==
- David Duncan (writer) (1913–1999), American screenwriter and novelist; wrote the screenplay for The Time Machine
- David Douglas Duncan (1916–2018), American photographer
- Dave Duncan (writer) (1933–2018), Scottish-Canadian fantasy and science fiction writer
- David James Duncan (born 1952), American novelist, essayist, and fly-fisher

== Sports ==
- Davie Duncan (1921–1991), Scottish footballer
- Dave Duncan (baseball) (born 1945), American Major League Baseball player and pitching coach
- David Duncan (footballer) (born 1963), Ghanaian football player and manager
- David Duncan (ski cross) (born 1982), Canadian ski cross racer

== Others ==
- David Duncan (minister) (1789–1829), Scottish Presbyterian minister
- David Duncan (politician) (1830–1886), British merchant and Liberal politician
- David Duncan (diplomat) (1923–2007), British diplomat
- David F. Duncan (born 1947), American epidemiologist and expert on drug abuse
- David Ewing Duncan (born 1958), American journalist
- David Duncan (accountant) (born 1960), United States government's star witness in the Arthur Andersen trial
- David Duncan (vintner) (born 1965), American vintner and entrepreneur

== See also ==
- David Duncan Main (1856–1934), British doctor
