= Ronald Nash =

Ronald Nash may refer to:

- Ronald H. Nash (1936–2006), philosophy professor
- Ronald Peter Nash (born 1946), British diplomat
