= Grandview Institution =

Chinese foreign policy think tank

The Grandview Institution
- Grandview Institution Consulting Co., Ltd
- 国观智库
- Founded: May 2013; 13 years ago
- Founder: Ren Li Bo
- Legal status: For-profit corporation
- Headquarters: Haidian District, Beijing, China
- Members: ~100
- Official language: Chinese
- President: Ren Li Bo
- Affiliations: Ministry of State Security
- Website: www.grandview.cn

Grandview Institution
- Simplified Chinese: 国观智库
Transcriptions

The Grandview Institution (GVI) is a foreign policy think tank headquartered in Beijing, China.

The institution describes itself as a private, for-profit corporation "responding to the requirements of the new era and new tasks." Foreign officials describe the institution as an "interlocutor" for the Chinese government, which regularly represents the Chinese side in track II diplomacy opposite senior officials, diplomats and attaché's from strategically important countries. The institution demonstrates persistent access to senior Chinese officials, and authority to speak for the Chinese government. Its staff is composed mostly of well-credentialed current and former officers of the Ministry of State Security, the principal civilian intelligence agency of the People's Republic of China. Grandview is the only private think tank authorized to submit intelligence and policy assessments directly to China's senior leadership via the classified Internal Reference (neican) system.

The institution maintains branch offices in Shenzhen and Xiamen, and international offices in Berlin and Washington, D.C.

== History ==
Ren Libo (任力波) founded the Grandview Institution in May 2013, just weeks after Chinese Communist Party general secretary Xi Jinping called for a "new type of think tank with Chinese characteristics." Prior to its founding, he spent a decade at Xinhua News Agency from 2001 to 2011, with five years assigned to Zhongnanhai as editor of highly classified neican reports to Central Committee of the Chinese Communist Party leaders, receiving more than 100 pishi (批示) instructions from senior leaders in return. He was Xinhua's chief correspondent in Pyongyang and drafted policy for the National Congress of the Chinese Communist Party. He remains Grandview's director, leading a staff of around 100.

=== Relationship with the Chinese government ===
Officials in the United Kingdom describe the think tank as an "interlocutor" for the Chinese government. In English, Grandview advertises that it "creates policy recommendations" for the Chinese central government, while in Chinese the institution acknowledges that it "accepts major strategic commissions from relevant central decision-making bodies as well as government departments."

The organization has deep ties to the Chinese security apparatus, including the Ministry of State Security (MSS) and military intelligence components of the People's Liberation Army. The Financial Times describes them as "linked", while The Daily Telegraph has characterized Grandview as a "front" for the MSS. Tian Shichen, the organization's vice president, was previously the Director of the Crisis Management Affairs and Media Division of the Propaganda Office of the Ministry of National Defense. The organization's principal researcher, Zhang Tuosheng (张沱生), was deputy military attaché at the Chinese Embassy in London, and spent thirty years as chair of the academic committee at the China Foundation for International and Strategic Studies (CFISS), an analytical branch of 2PLA, then-China's military intelligence component. Several other research fellows served in the China Institute for International and Strategic Studies (CIISS), another arm of PLA military intelligence. Li Yan (李艳), Director of the Institute of Sci-Tech and Cyber Security Studies at the China Institutes of Contemporary International Relations, a bureau of the MSS, collaborates with Grandview on projects assessing the national security implications of emerging technologies.

=== Track II diplomacy ===
In December 2025, Grandview participated in the third U.S.-China Strategic Security and Stability Dialogue, with representatives opposite U.S. officials Stephen Biegun, former Deputy Secretary of State; Mike Mullen, former Chairman of the Joint Chiefs; Rose Gottemoeller, former Under Secretary of State for Arms Control and Deputy Secretary General of NATO; and James O. Ellis Jr., former commander of U.S. Strategic Command.

In June and November 2025, Grandview participated in the 5th and 6th rounds of bilateral talks on stability on the Korean Peninsula, representing China opposite the chargé d'affaires and diplomatic staff from the Embassy of South Korea in Beijing.

GVI has organized foreign delegations to Germany, conducting dialogues on European and Chinese interests in the Russo-Ukrainian war with Sarah Zielonka, Policy Officer for China Affairs at the German Federal Foreign Office, and researchers at the German Institute for International and Security Affairs, including former German Ambassador to China Volker Stanzel. In 2023, GVI representatives discussed the conflict opposite Stanilaw Kaczynski, the Polish Military Attaché to China.

During the Second China–U.S. Nuclear Failsafe Dialogue in October 2025, GVI hosted a U.S. delegation from the Nuclear Threat Initiative including former Senate Armed Services Committee chairman Sam Nunn and former Principal Deputy Administrator of the National Nuclear Security Administration Madelyn Creedon on visits to the Ministry of Foreign Affairs and International Department of the CPC, including a meeting with IDCPC Vice Minister Ma Hui. This, along with other meetings from Asian, European, and American representatives, ultimately produced a key joint statement of "Support for Preventing the Accidental, Mistaken, or Unauthorized Use of a Nuclear Weapon: Nuclear “Fail-Safe”" published jointly at the 2026 Munich Security Conference. The document highlights a mutual understanding of the importance of avoiding strategic nuclear miscalculation caused by artificial intelligence, cybersecurity vulnerabilities, or rising geopolitical tensions.

In May 2026, the former head of MI6, Richard Dearlove, called for a probe of Stephen Lillie's past discussions with GVI, citing UK national security concerns.

== Research areas ==
The institution has been described as "somewhat more foreign-affairs oriented than its counterparts", covering "ocean security", the Belt and Road Initiative, "frontier governance" for regions such as Xinjiang, Tibet, and Inner Mongolia, digital governance, and China's bilateral relations with major world powers, including the U.S., Japan, the European Union, and India. The organization is reported to have close relations with around 20 think tanks, including Chatham House in London, and restraint-aligned organizations including the Quincy Institute and Carter Center in the United States.

=== Xinjiang ===
In 2025, the Institution participated in a seminar on managing security in Xinjiang alongside representatives from the United Front Work Department (UFWD), People's Armed Police Headquarters, the China Institutes of Contemporary International Relations (part of the MSS), Xinhua News Agency, and the UFWD's Minzu University of China. The institution highlighted its field work in Xinjiang, discussing public security, ethnic affairs, and religious policies toward the Uyghurs with security officials in the region.

== See also ==
- Foreign policy of China
- Chinese intelligence activity abroad
