= Stanzel =

Stanzel is a surname. Notable people with the surname include:

- Franz Karl Stanzel (1923–2023), Austrian literary theorist
- Scott Stanzel (born 1973), political appointee in the administration of President of the United States George W. Bush
- Volker Stanzel (born 1948), German diplomat

== See also ==
- Stansel
