= List of high commissioners of the United Kingdom to Jamaica =

The high commissioner of the United Kingdom to Jamaica is the United Kingdom's foremost diplomatic representative in Jamaica, and head of the UK's diplomatic mission in Jamaica.

As fellow members of the Commonwealth of Nations, diplomatic relations between the United Kingdom and Jamaica are at governmental level, rather than between heads of state. Thus, the countries exchange high commissioners rather than ambassadors.

Between 2005 and 2019, the British high commissioner to Jamaica was also non-resident high commissioner to The Bahamas.

== High commissioners to Jamaica ==
- 1962–1965: Sir Alexander Morley KCMG CBE
- 1965–1970: Dalton Murray CMG
- 1970–1973: Sir Nick Larmour KCMG
- 1973–1976: John Hennings CMG
- 1976–1981: John Drinkall CMG
- 1982–1984: Barry Smallman CMG CVO
- 1984–1987: Sir Martin Reid KBE CMG
- 1987–1989: Alan Payne CMG
- 1989–1995: Derek Milton CMG
- 1995–1999: Richard Thomas CMG
- 1999–2002: Antony Smith CMG
- 2002–2005: Peter Mathers LVO
- 2005–2009: Jeremy Cresswell CVO
- 2009–2013: Howard Drake OBE
- 2013–2017: David Fitton CMG
- 2017–2021: Asif Ahmad CMG
- 2021–2025: Judith Slater
- 2021–present: Alicia Herbert OBE
