= Quinton Quayle =

British diplomat (born 1955)

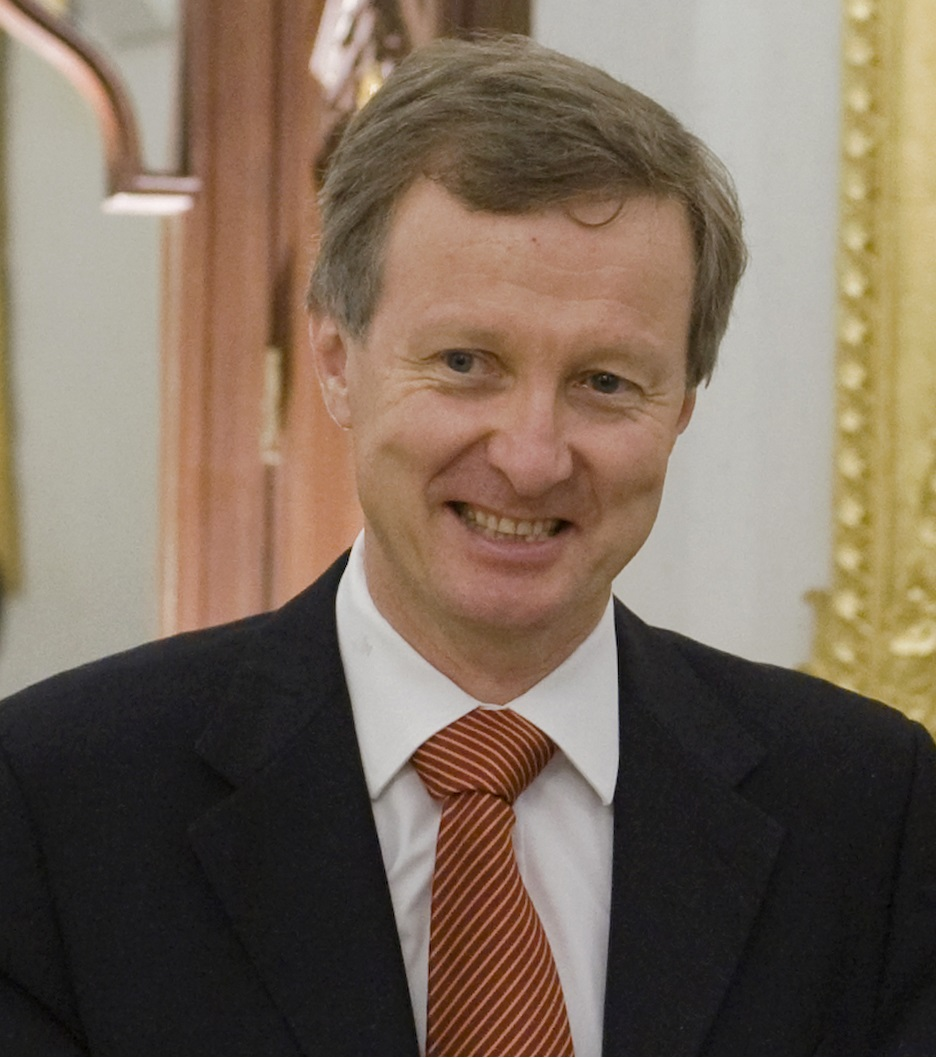
Quinton Quayle, during his tenure as British Ambassador to Thailand.

Quinton Mark Quayle (born 5 June 1955) is a British retired diplomat.

== Early life, education and early career ==
Educated at Bromsgrove School, Humphry Davy School and University of Bristol, Quayle entered the Foreign Office in 1977 and studied Thai at the School of Oriental and African Studies, University of London and at Chiang Mai University.

== Diplomatic career ==
Before being sent to Romania, Quayle's previous Diplomatic Service postings included:

- Bangkok, Thailand (Second Secretary, Political)
- Paris, France (First Secretary, Political)
- Jakarta, Indonesia (Deputy Head of Mission)

Quayle served as British Ambassador to Romania from 2002 until 2006, after which he was concurrently appointed as Her Majesty's Ambassador to the Kingdom of Thailand and (non-resident) Ambassador to the Lao People's Democratic Republic. He took up this post in August 2007, succeeding David Fall, and was replaced in November 2010 by Asif Ahmad.

Quayle spent a lot of time in his roles as Ambassador promoting trade and investment and worked very closely with the British Chamber of Commerce in Thailand (BCCT); his job directly before his posting to Bucharest was as International Group Director with UK Trade and Investment.

== Other work ==
He has also worked in the private sector for Price Waterhouse Management Consultants and VT Group. From 2011 to 2016, he served on the boards of the Institute of Chartered Accountants of Scotland, the Royal Institution of Chartered Surveyors and the Nursing and Midwifery Council. He also acted as senior adviser to De La Rue, Salamander Energy (now Medco Energi Global) in this period. More recently, he has served as a lay member of the Queen's Counsel Appointments Panel, as a board member of Cottsway Housing Association, as a public interest member of the Chartered Institute of Taxation, as a non-executive director of 2gether NHS Foundation Trust and sat on the governing council of the Council for Licensed Conveyancers. International roles included serving as advisor to the president and CEO of Thai Beverages and as senior advisor to Prudential. He currently serves as an adviser to Gurin Energy in Thailand and, in the UK, as chair and panel member of both the High Speed 2 (HS2) and East West Railways "Need to Sell" Panels and as senior independent director and independent commissioner at the Data and Marketing Commission.

== Personal life ==
He is married to Alison Quayle, a retired professional translator, and has two sons, Christopher and Alexander, both of whom work in the banking industry. His father was Eric Quayle, a British writer and book collector.

== Offices held ==
Diplomatic posts
Preceded by Richard Ralph	British Ambassador to Romania; 2002–2006	Succeeded by Robin Barnett
Preceded by David Fall	British Ambassador to Thailand; 2007–2010	Succeeded by Asif Ahmad
Preceded by David Fall	British Ambassador to Laos (non-resident); 2007–2010	Succeeded by Asif Ahmad
