= Jeremy Cresswell =

British former diplomat

British High Commissioner to Jamaica
- In office 2005–2009
- Monarch: Elizabeth II
- Prime Minister: Tony Blair; Gordon Brown
- Preceded by: Peter Mathers
- Succeeded by: Howard Drake

Personal details
- Born: 1 October 1949 (age 76)

Jeremy Michael Cresswell CVO (born 1 October 1949) is a British former diplomat who was High Commissioner to Jamaica and the Bahamas from 2005 to 2009. He retired from the Diplomatic Service in December 2009.

== Early life ==
Cresswell was born in Windsor. He was educated at Sir William Borlase's Grammar School; Exeter College, Oxford; and Johannes Gutenberg University Mainz

== Career ==
Cresswell entered the FCO in 1972. He served in Brussels and Kuala Lumpur before becoming Private Secretary to the Minister of State at the FCO in 1980. He was later Deputy Head at the News Department; Assistant Head at the South America Department; Counsellor (Political) for the UK Delegation to NATO; Deputy Head of Mission in Prague; on the Senior Directing Staff at the RCDS; and Head of the European Union Department at the FCO. From 2001 to 2005 he was Minister and Deputy Head of Mission in Berlin.

Diplomatic posts
Preceded by Peter Mathers	British High Commissioner to Jamaica; 2005–2009	Succeeded by Howard Drake
Preceded by Roderick Gemmell	British High Commissioner to the Bahamas; 2005–2009	Succeeded by Howard Drake
