= Asif Ahmad =

British diplomat (born 1956)

Asif Ahmad CMG
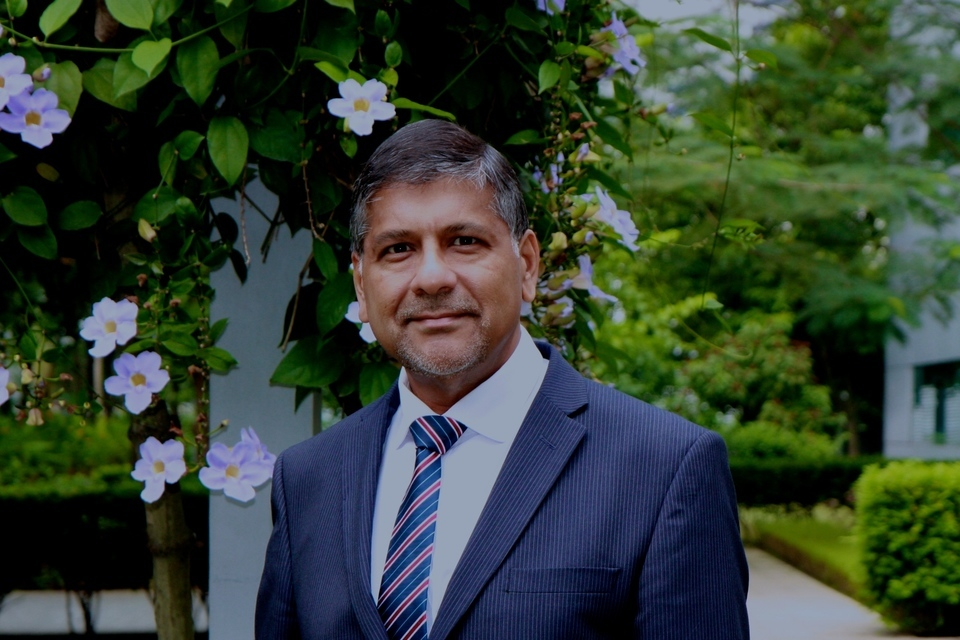

British High Commissioner to Jamaica
- In office August 2017 – August 2021
- Monarch: Elizabeth II
- Prime Minister: Theresa May; Boris Johnson
- Preceded by: David Fitton
- Succeeded by: Judith Slater

British High Commissioner to the Bahamas
- In office 2017–2019
- Monarch: Elizabeth II
- Prime Minister: Theresa May
- Preceded by: David Fitton
- Succeeded by: Sarah Dickson

British Ambassador to the Philippines and Ambassador to Palau
- In office July 2013 – July 2017
- Monarch: Elizabeth II
- Prime Minister: David Cameron; Theresa May
- Preceded by: Stephen Lillie
- Succeeded by: Daniel Pruce

British Ambassador to Laos and Ambassador to Thailand
- In office 2010–2012
- Monarch: Elizabeth II
- Prime Minister: David Cameron
- Preceded by: Quinton Quayle
- Succeeded by: Philip Malone (as Ambassador to Laos); Mark Kent (as Ambassador to Thailand)

Personal details
- Born: 21 January 1956 (age 70) London, England
- Education: St Cuthbert's Society, Durham
- Profession: Diplomat

Asif Ahmad CMG (Bengali: আসিফ আনোয়ার আহমেদ; born 21 January 1956) is a banker-turned-diplomat, having served as a Senior Civil Servant at the Foreign, Commonwealth and Development Office. From 2017 to August 2021 he was the British High Commissioner to Jamaica. He was the British Ambassador to Thailand from November 2010 until August 2012. He was the British Ambassador to the Philippines from July 2013 to 2017. He has also been accredited to the Bahamas, Palau and Laos.

== Early life ==
Ahmad was born on 21 January 1956 in London, England. He is the son of the late Salahuddin Ahmad, a Pakistani and later Bangladeshi diplomat and Bandana Ahmad, an expert in social services in the UK. He was educated at the Community High School, Tehran and then Carlisle Technical College. He studied economics at St Cuthbert's Society, Durham University, graduating in 1977 with a Bachelor of Arts (BA) degree. Later, he attended INSEAD and completed its International Executive Program in 1991.

== Career ==
He joined National Westminster Bank, where he stayed until 1996, during which time he studied at INSEAD. His banking career included roles in International Banking, oversight of Coutts & Co and as Senior Manager of a network of high street branches centred at County Hall, London. He joined Business Link London in 1996, as a Personal Business Adviser, transferring to the Foreign, Commonwealth and Development Office in 1999. After a period in the FCO's Resource and Budgeting Department he was appointed to the Senior Civil Service and served as Head of the Commonwealth Department.

In 2003, Ahmad was seconded to the Prime Minister's Office where he served as head of the Communication and Information Centre for a period, and then to UK Trade and Investment where he was Director, Asia from 2004 until 2008. He returned to FCO policy work as head of the South East Asia and Pacific department, dealing with issues relating to ASEAN countries, Australia, New Zealand and the Pacific. For a short period in 2009, he ran the British embassy in Rangoon.

In 2010, Ahmad was appointed as Her Majesty's Ambassador to Thailand and Laos. Apart from the UK, he has lived in Bangladesh, Pakistan, Iran, Japan, China, Poland, Thailand, Philippines and Jamaica.

From July 2013 to July 2017 he was British Ambassador to the Philippines and to Palau. In August 2017 he became the British High Commissioner to Jamaica.

== Awards and recognition ==
In January 2014, Ahmad was nominated for the Civil Servant of the Year award at the British Muslim Awards.

In 2017, Ahmad was appointed a Companion of the Order of St Michael and St George (CMG) in the 2017 Birthday Honours.

== Honours ==
Key to the City

- Cebu, Philippines (12 March 2015)

Diplomatic posts
Preceded by Quinton Quayle	British Ambassador to Thailand; 2010–2012	Succeeded by Mark Kent
Preceded by Quinton Quayle	British Ambassador to Laos; 2010–2012	Succeeded by Philip Malone
Preceded by Stephen Lillie	British Ambassador to the Philippines; 2013–2017	Succeeded by Daniel Pruce
Preceded by Stephen Lillie	British Ambassador to Palau; 2013–2017	Succeeded by Daniel Pruce
Preceded by David Fitton	British High Commissioner to the Bahamas; 2017–2019	Succeeded by Sarah Dickson
Preceded by David Fitton	British High Commissioner to Jamaica; 2017-2021	Succeeded by Judith Slater
