= David Fitton =

British diplomat

David Fitton CMG
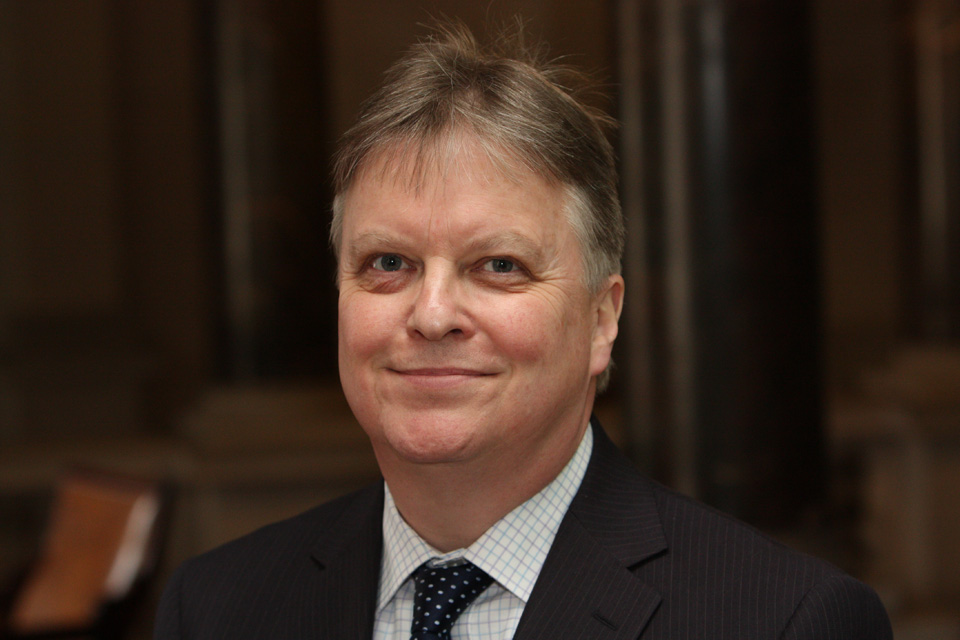

British High Commissioner to Jamaica
- In office June 2013 – 2017
- Monarch: Elizabeth II
- Preceded by: Howard Drake
- Succeeded by: Asif Ahmad

Personal details
- Born: David John Fitton; 10 January 1955 (age 71)
- Education: Durham University

David John Fitton CMG (born 10 January 1955) is a former British diplomat who served as High Commissioner to Jamaica from 2013 to 2017.

== Early life and education ==
Fitton studied at Durham University, graduating with an upper second-class degree in French in 1978.

== Career ==
Fitton joined the Foreign and Commonwealth Office in 1980. He initially served as a Desk Officer in the West Africa Department and then undertook a year of Japanese language training.

From 1982 to 1986, Fitton served at the British Embassy, Tokyo. After returning to London, he worked in the European Department before serving as Head of the India Team from 1988 to 1990. He was subsequently First Secretary in New Delhi (1990–1993), Deputy Head of the Southern European Department (1993–1996), and Counsellor in Tokyo (1996–2000).

Fitton served as Deputy Head of Mission in Ankara from 2001 to 2004. He returned to Tokyo in 2008 as Deputy Head of Mission, remaining there until 2012. In June 2013, he became British High Commissioner to Jamaica, with concurrent non-resident accreditation to the Bahamas. He served until 2017.

Diplomatic posts
Preceded by Howard Drake	British High Commissioner to Jamaica; 2013–2017	Succeeded by Asif Ahmad
Preceded by Howard Drake	British High Commissioner to the Bahamas; 2013–2017	Succeeded by Asif Ahmad
