= Richard Dearlove =

British former intelligence officer (born 1945)

Sir Richard Dearlove KCMG OBE
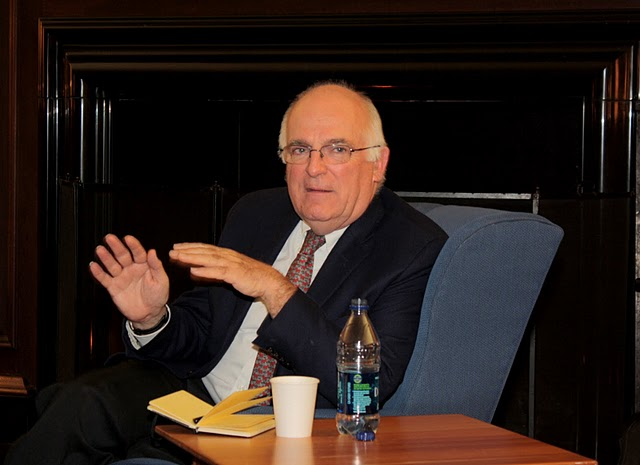

13th Chief of the Secret Intelligence Service
- In office 1999 – 6 May 2004
- Preceded by: David Spedding
- Succeeded by: John Scarlett

Personal details
- Born: Richard Billing Dearlove; 23 January 1945 (age 81) Gorran Haven, England
- Education: Queens' College, Cambridge (MA)
- Occupation: Intelligence officer
- Awards: Knight Commander of the Order of St Michael and St George; Officer of the Order of the British Empire

Sir Richard Billing Dearlove KCMG OBE (born 23 January 1945) is a retired British intelligence officer who was head of the British Secret Intelligence Service (MI6), a role known informally as "C", from 1999 until 6 May 2004. He was head of MI6 during the invasion of Iraq. He was criticised by the Iraq Inquiry for providing unverified intelligence about weapons of mass destruction to the Prime Minister, Tony Blair. He was Master of Pembroke College, Cambridge from 2004 to 2015.

== Early life and education ==
Dearlove was born at Gorran Haven, Cornwall, the son of Jack Dearlove, a 1948 Olympic silver medallist in rowing. He received his early formal education at Monkton Combe School near Bath, Somerset, and a year in Kent School in Kent, Connecticut. He graduated from Queens' College, Cambridge, with a BA degree in history, later promoted to an MA.

== Career ==
=== HM's civil service ===
Dearlove joined MI6 in 1966 and was posted to Nairobi in 1968. In 1984, he was appointed an OBE. After being posted to Prague, Paris and Geneva, he became head of Washington station in 1991, director of personnel and administration in 1993 and director of operations in 1994. Dearlove was appointed chief of MI6 in 1999, by Foreign Secretary Robin Cook, following David Spedding's August 1999 retirement from the position. Dearlove facilitated publication of the Mitrokhin Archive, under Project Jessant. In 2001, he was appointed Knight Commander of the Order of St Michael and St George (KCMG).

His tenure as head of MI6 saw many events for the Service as well as tension with the Government over the evidence for war on Iraq. It has been suggested that many within the intelligence community were uneasy that their qualified judgements on Iraq's weapons of mass destruction were presented as hard facts in various dossiers (e.g. the September Dossier and the Dodgy Dossier aka the Iraq Dossier). In July 2002, Dearlove privately told ministers that in the US "intelligence and facts were being fixed around the policy".

The official Chilcot Report published in 2016 criticised Dearlove for presenting so-called "hot" intelligence about alleged weapons of mass destruction provided by an Iraqi with "phenomenal access" to high levels in the Iraqi government directly to Prime Minister, Tony Blair, without first confirming its accuracy. The investigators found that references to this intelligence in government reports were over-certain and did not adequately stress uncertainties and nuance. The informant was later found to have been lying. The Chilcot report stated that "personal intervention [by Dearlove] and its urgency gave added weight to a report that had not been properly evaluated and would have coloured the perception of ministers and senior officials". The day after the report was published, Blair conceded that he should have challenged such intelligence reports before relying on them to justify military action in Iraq.

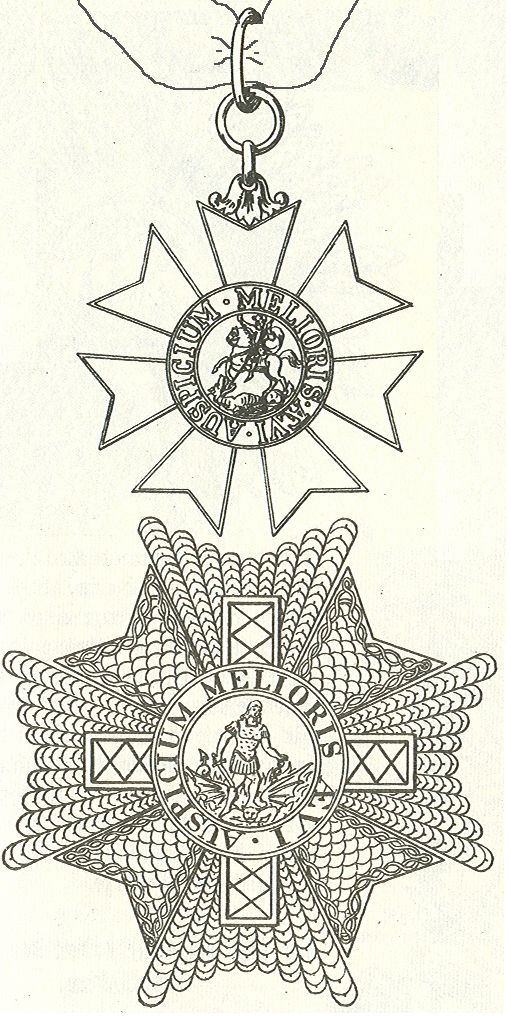
KCMG Badge and Breast Star

=== University administrator ===
Dearlove was elected Master of Pembroke College, Cambridge, on 1 August 2004. He accepted an invitation to become the Chairman of Trustees of the Cambridge Union Society in 2006. As Master of Pembroke, Dearlove was ex officio chairman of the board of Trustees of Pembroke House, a community centre in Walworth, London, via the college's patronage of the advowson of St Christopher's, Walworth (CofE). As of 2017, he is still the President of Pembroke College Boat Club (Cambridge).

In February 2008, Dearlove gave evidence at the inquest of Princess Diana's death, responding to Harrods owner Mohamed al-Fayed who said that MI6 had murdered Diana.

Dearlove is a signatory of the Henry Jackson Society principles. He is also a "senior advisor" to the Monitor Group – a consultancy and private equity firm which has been implicated in undertaking PR work for Libya and Muammar Gaddafi. In April 2013, it was announced that Dearlove had joined the advisory board of Ergo, an intelligence and advisory firm.

On 15 February 2011, Dearlove gave a talk at the Cambridge Union Society, taking as his theme the question of how much secrecy the UK needs: "The short answer to that question is that it needs some but actually not as much as you think." He said he "would definitely draw a parallel at the moment between the wave of political unrest which is sweeping through the Middle East, in a very excited and rather extraordinary fashion, and also the Wikileaks phenomenon", but added later, in connection with the way technological advances was altering the norms of civic and private life, commenting on WikiLeaks founder Julian Assange, that "the Assange story, as such, is ultimately a distraction. He's a very undignified flag-carrier, in my opinion, for a very important issue."

In 2012, Dearlove took a sabbatical from Cambridge University to write an account of events leading up to the 2003 invasion of Iraq from his perspective at MI6, including coverage of the production of the so-called "dodgy dossier". Publishing such an account would be unprecedented for a former Chief of the Secret Intelligence Service. He may release this now that the Chilcot Inquiry findings have been published in 2016.

On 7 July 2014, in a lecture at the Royal United Services Institute, Dearlove argued that the government and media had exaggerated the Islamist terrorism threat to the UK, giving extremists publicity counter-productive to UK interests.

In 2015, Dearlove retired as Master of Pembroke College, and was succeeded by Chris Smith, Baron Smith of Finsbury. He is non-executive chairman of Crossword Cybersecurity plc.

=== Political views ===
On 16 May 2016, Dearlove gave a public lecture televised by the BBC on contemporary mass foreign migration and its effects upon the European continent. In its text he stated that the governments of Europe were facing a "sea change" in their politics, and if they did not get control and prevent ongoing mass migration of peoples from Africa and Asia into Europe they would find themselves "at the mercy of a populist uprising, ... which is already stirring," and that the oncoming 2016 United Kingdom European Union membership referendum was the first manifestation of it. He stated further that foreign mass migration's geopolitical impact upon Europe, if it was not prevented, was set to reshape its political landscape as those of its citizens who feel their interests are threatened asserted their influence.

On 8 June 2017, Dearlove intervened on the day of the 2017 UK general election in The Daily Telegraph saying "how profoundly dangerous it would be for the nation if Jeremy Corbyn becomes Prime Minister."

On 29 November 2018 Dearlove co-signed an open letter, published in a British national newspaper, condemning Prime Minister Theresa May's negotiated Brexit withdrawal agreement after the 2016 Referendum on the issue, as the matter was passing through the House of Commons to be voted upon. In its text he stated that the Withdrawal Agreement as negotiated undermined MI6's nationally independent global intelligence power. In a published response, dated the same day, May's office issued a public rebuttal to the letter's content, singling out Dearlove personally from the named list of several signatories to the open letter, and stating that the Withdrawal Agreement "absolutely does not" compromise the national independence of the UK's intelligence capacity. In early December 2018 Dearlove, in a jointly authored text with Major-General Julian Thompson, published on the website 'Briefings for Brexit' an extensive reply to May's statement entitled 'The Prime Minister is misleading the country on defence and security', citing a 'worryingly poor understanding of the issues' by her office.

On 8 January 2019, Dearlove sent a letter co-signed by Field Marshal Lord Guthrie to all Chairs of Conservative Party Parliamentary Constituency Associations with sitting Members of Parliament stating that the passage through the House of Commons of the Brexit withdrawal agreement contained decisions which fundamentally undermined the integrity of the Defence of the Realm, and requested that they take measures to discourage their parliamentary representatives from voting for it in the Commons. The letter as an alternative advocated the case upon national security grounds that the United Kingdom should fully withdraw from the European Union without an Intergovernmental relationship between the two persisting after the process.

On 16 May 2019 Dearlove characterised Huawei's role in the British 5G network as "an unnecessary risk" as it could give the Chinese government a "potentially advantageous exploitative position". On 17 January 2020, as U.S. President Donald Trump was held to be bluffing by the EU Trade Commissioner Phil Hogan over the incompatibility of Five Eyes and Huawei, Dearlove said Huawei posed a security threat "without question... It’s a capability in the bank that China will use if it needs to... If the Chinese state says to Huawei 'jump' the company can’t turn round and say 'no'."

In June 2020 Dearlove said, in a podcast interview, that he believed Coronavirus disease 2019 began 'as an accident' either in the Wuhan Institute of Virology lab or in the Wuhan Centre for Disease Control, citing a paper by Sørensen et al. The paper discusses a vaccine candidate based on the furin cleavage site, and describes unusual features in the virus’s spike protein, such as positively charged inserts and a furin-like cleavage site, and refers to SARS-CoV-2 as a "chimeric virus." However, it does not suggest that the virus came from a laboratory.

In April 2025, Dearlove was the co-host of One Decision, a geopolitical podcast and media platform. In May 2026, Dearlove called for a probe of Stephen Lillie's past discussions with Grandview Institution, a think tank with links to China's Ministry of State Security, citing national security concerns.

Government offices
Preceded by Sir David Spedding	Chief of the SIS; 1999–2004	Succeeded by Sir John Scarlett
Academic offices
Preceded by Sir Roger Tomkys	Master of Pembroke College, Cambridge; 2004–2015	Succeeded by Baron Smith of Finsbury
