= Ross Denny =

British diplomat

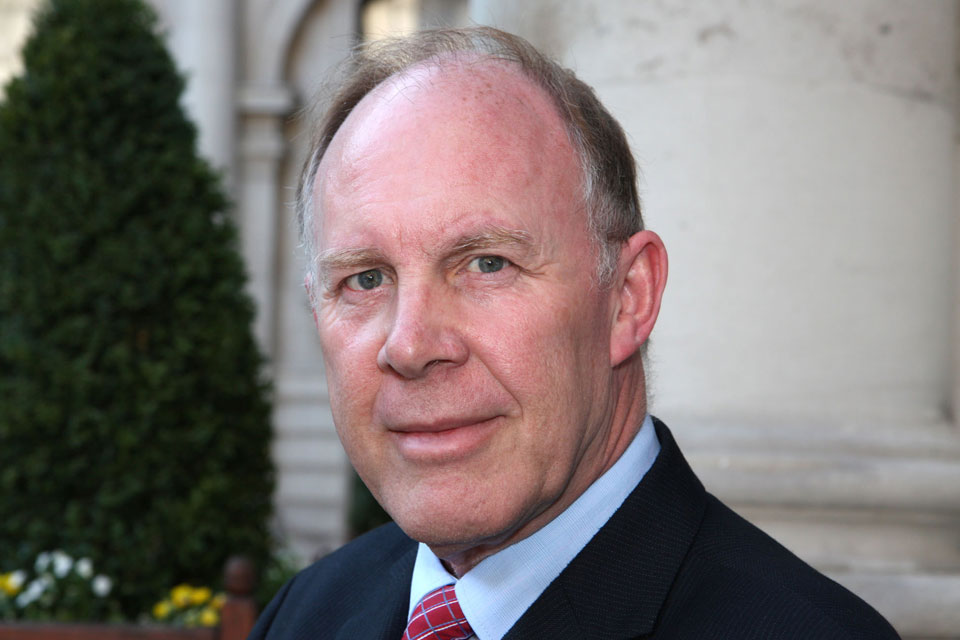

British Ambassador to Costa Rica
- In office February 2015 – October 2020
- Monarch: Elizabeth II
- Prime Minister: David Cameron; Theresa May; Boris Johnson
- Preceded by: Sharon Campbell
- Succeeded by: Ben Lyster-Binns

Non-Resident British Ambassador to Nicaragua
- In office February 2015 – October 2020
- Monarch: Elizabeth II
- Prime Minister: David Cameron; Theresa May; Boris Johnson
- Preceded by: Chris Campbell
- Succeeded by: Ben Lyster-Binns

Personal details
- Born: Ross Patrick Denny; 1955 (age 70–71) Southampton, Hampshire, England
- Spouse: Claudenise de Lima Denny
- Children: 4
- Occupation: Diplomat

Ross Patrick Denny (born 1955) is a British diplomat who was the British Ambassador to Costa Rica and Nicaragua from 2015 to 2020. He was appointed as ambassador on 3 February 2015 and succeeded Sharon Campbell and Chris Campbell in September that year. He was transferred to another post in October 2020, being succeeded by Ben Lyster-Binns.

== Pre-consular career ==
Before joining the Foreign Service, Denny served in the Royal Navy from 1972 until 1979.

== Consular career ==
Denny joined the Foreign and Commonwealth Office (FCO) in 1979 and first worked in the West Indies and Atlantic Department. In 1980, he was moved to be an Accountant for the British Embassy in Santiago, Chile and stayed there for three years. He was then moved to the British Embassy in Doha, Qatar to be an Assistant Management Officer.

In 1985, Denny was posted to Warsaw as Vice Consul and from 1988 to 1990 he was a Desk Officer in the Personnel Department of the FCO. He then became Desk Officer for the Papua New Guinea and South West Pacific Department and in 1992 was sent to the Hague as a Second Secretary.

Denny was made Deputy Head of Mission in Luanda, Angola under Ambassador John Thompson from 2002 to 2005. In 2008, he was appointed the Administrator of Ascension. He remained in the post for three years before he was made United Kingdom Ambassador to Bolivia. He stayed as Bolivian ambassador until 2015 when he was made Ambassador to Costa Rica and Non-Resident Ambassador to Nicaragua.

In 2018, Denny said that he was "deeply concerned" about the violence of the 2018 Nicaraguan protests and called on the government to "uphold ... the human rights of all Nicaraguans".

Denny was transferred to another post in October 2020, being succeeded by Ben Lyster-Binns. In 2021, Denny was the acting High Commissioner to Guyana and Suriname for a period. A new high commissioner, Jane Miller, was announced in June 2021 and took up her post the next month.

== Personal life ==
Denny has a wife and four children, two sons and two daughters.

Diplomatic posts
Preceded by Michael Hill	Administrator of Ascension; 2008–2011	Succeeded by Miles Miller (acting)
Preceded by Nigel Baker	British Ambassador to Bolivia; 2011–2015	Succeeded by James Thornton
Preceded by Sharon Campbell	British Ambassador to Costa Rica; 2015–2020	Succeeded by Ben Lyster-Binns
Preceded by Chris Campbell	British Ambassador to Nicaragua; 2015–2020	Succeeded by Ben Lyster-Binns
