= Stephen Lillie =

British ambassador

Stephen Lillie CMG (born 4 February 1966) is a British diplomat who was High Commissioner to Cyprus from 2018 to 2022.

== Career ==
Lillie was educated at South Wolds Comprehensive School and The Queen's College, Oxford. He joined HM Diplomatic Service in 1988 and was sent for Chinese language training at the School of Oriental and African Studies and the Chinese University of Hong Kong 1989–91. He served in Beijing 1992–96, at the Foreign and Commonwealth Office (FCO) 1996–99, at Guangzhou as Consul-General 1999–2003, and in New Delhi 2003–06. He was head of the Far Eastern Department at the FCO 2006–09, then ambassador to the Philippines and also non-resident ambassador to Micronesia, the Marshall Islands and Palau 2009–13. He was Director, Asia Pacific, at the FCO 2013–17 and was then appointed to be High Commissioner to the Republic of Cyprus from April 2018. In May 2026, the former head of MI6, Richard Dearlove, called for a probe of Lillie's past discussions with Grandview Institution, a think tank with links to China's Ministry of State Security, citing national security concerns.

== Honours ==
- Philippines: Grand Cross of the Order of Sikatuna, Rank of Datu (2 July 2013).
- United Kingdom: Companion of the Order of St Michael and St George (CMG) (2017 Birthday Honours).

Diplomatic posts
Preceded by Ian Wellfare	British Consul-General in Guangzhou; 1999–2003	Succeeded by Christopher Wood
Preceded by Peter Beckingham	British Ambassador to the Philippines, Micronesia, the Marshall Islands and Palau; 2009–2013	Succeeded by Asif Ahmad
Preceded by Matthew Kidd	British High Commissioner to Cyprus; 2018–2022	Succeeded by Irfan Siddiq
