= Chris Campbell (diplomat) =

British diplomat

His Excellency Chris Campbell
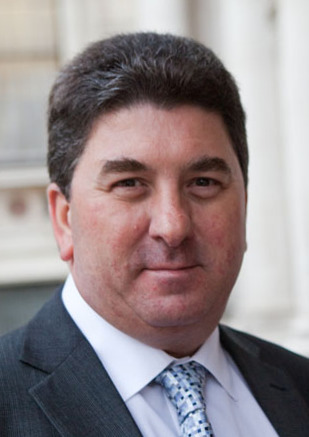
- Campbell in 2013

British Ambassador to Ecuador
- In office November 2020 – August 2025
- Monarchs: Elizabeth II; Charles III
- Prime Minister: Boris Johnson; Liz Truss; Rishi Sunak; Keir Starmer
- Preceded by: Katherine Ward
- Succeeded by: Libby Green

British Ambassador to the Dominican Republic
- In office 2015–2019
- Monarch: Elizabeth II
- Prime Minister: David Cameron; Theresa May; Boris Johnson
- Preceded by: Steven Fisher
- Succeeded by: Mockbul Ali

British Ambassador to Nicaragua
- In office 2011 – 2 June 2015
- Monarch: Elizabeth II
- Prime Minister: David Cameron
- Preceded by: Thomas Kennedy
- Succeeded by: Ross Denny

Personal details
- Born: Christopher John Campbell
- Spouse: Sharon Campbell
- Occupation: Diplomat

Christopher John Campbell is a British diplomat who served as the United Kingdom's ambassador to Ecuador from 2020 until 2025. He also served as the ambassador to Nicaragua between 2011 and 2015 and the ambassador to the Dominican Republic between 2015 and 2020.

== Consular career ==
Campbell joined the Foreign and Commonwealth Office in 1982 and started in the North America Department. In 1984, he moved to the Secretary of State's Private Office and the next year was placed to the UK Embassy in Khartoum as an economist. From 1988 he worked at the embassy in Dhaka and from 1992 at the embassy in Jakarta.

Campbell served as the Ambassador to Nicaragua from 2011 to 2015. During the same period, his wife, Sharon Campbell, was the Ambassador to Costa Rica, making them one of the only married couples to ever be ambassadors to neighbouring countries. Because the UK did not have an embassy in Nicaragua, the post was non-residential and Campbell worked from San José.

He served as the British Ambassador to the Dominican Republic from 2015 to 2020.

On 13 October 2020, he was recognised as British Ambassador to Ecuador. In July 2022, Niels Olsen, Ecuador's tourism minister, credited the work of Campbell and Ecuador's foreign minister Juan Carlos Holguín after the UK Foreign Office announced Ecuador would be moved to the green list for travel. Campbell served as ambassador until August 2025, with Libby Green being announced as his successor.

== Personal life ==
Campbell met his wife Sharon while working at the Foreign and Commonwealth Office and they married in 1989.

Diplomatic posts
Preceded by Thomas Kennedy	United Kingdom Ambassador to Nicaragua; 2011–2015	Succeeded by Ross Denny
Preceded by Steven Fisher	United Kingdom Ambassador to the Dominican Republic; 2015–2020	Succeeded by Mockbul Ali
