= List of ambassadors of the United Kingdom to El Salvador =

The ambassador of the United Kingdom to the Republic of El Salvador is the United Kingdom's foremost diplomatic representative in El Salvador, and in charge of the UK's diplomatic mission in San Salvador.

Until 1945, UK envoys to Guatemala were also accredited to El Salvador (see List of ambassadors of the United Kingdom to Guatemala). From 1982 to 1991, the embassy was a joint mission with Honduras and from 2003 to 2012 it was again combined with Guatemala. In mid-2012 the British Embassy in San Salvador was re-opened with a resident Ambassador.

== List of heads of mission ==
=== Envoys extraordinary and ministers plenipotentiary ===
- 1945–1948: Norman Mayers
- 1948–1949: Harry Steptoe
- 1949–1950: Daniel Brickell
- 1950–1953: Ralph Tottenham Smith
- 1954–1956: Vyvyan Holt
- 1956: Frederick Everson

=== Ambassadors extraordinary and plenipotentiary ===
- 1956–1960: Frederick Everson
- 1960–1967: Geoffrey Kirk
- 1967–1971: Michael Wenner
- 1971–1975: Donovan Clibborn
- 1975–1977: Albert Hughes
- 1977–1979: Achilles Papadopoulos
- 1982–1983: Colum Sharkey (non-resident)
- 1984–1987: Bryan White (non-resident)
- 1987–1989: David Joy (non-resident)
- 1989–1991: Peter Streams (non-resident)
- 1991–1995: Michael Connor
- 1995–1999: Ian Gerken
- 1999–2003: Patrick Morgan
- 2003–2006: Richard Lavers (non-resident)
- 2006–2009: Ian Hughes (non-resident)
- 2009–2012: Julie Chappell (non-resident)
- 2012–2014: Linda Cross
- 2014–2015: Ned Holborn (chargé d'affaires)
- 2015–2019: Bernhard Garside
- 2019–present: Nick Whittingham (chargé d'affaires)
