= John Stewart (diplomat) =

British geologist, diplomat (1927–1995)

John Anthony Benedict Stewart CMG OBE (24 May 1927 – 12 September 1995) was a British geologist, colonial administrator and diplomat who was the first British ambassador to the unified Vietnam.

== Career ==
Stewart was at school at St Illtyd's College in Cardiff (now St Illtyd's Catholic High School), then served in the Royal Navy 1944–47. After being demobilised in 1947 he studied at University College, Cardiff, and gained a first-class degree in mineralogy and petrology. He then did post-graduate research at St Catharine's College, Cambridge, and gained a diploma in geochemistry from Imperial College London. He joined the Colonial Geological Survey Service in 1952 and was sent to the then British Somaliland; he published several papers on the geology of the area. In 1956 he was seconded to the Somali political service as a district officer and then in 1957 to the Ogaden region of Ethiopia as a liaison officer. In 1960 he was transferred to Northern Rhodesia where he helped to conclude the Barotseland Agreement of 1964.

In 1968 Stewart transferred to the Diplomatic Service and served in Barbados and Uganda before being appointed Ambassador to the Democratic Republic of Vietnam 1975–76, at the end of the Vietnam War; he was the first British ambassador to Vietnam to be based in Hanoi rather than Saigon. He was head of the Hong Kong department at the Foreign and Commonwealth Office 1976–78, Ambassador to Laos 1978–80, Ambassador to Mozambique 1980–84, and High Commissioner to Sri Lanka 1984–87. He then retired from the Diplomatic Service and was chairman of the Civil Service Selection Board 1987–94.

Stewart was appointed OBE in 1973, and CMG in the 1979 New Year Honours.

Stewart's great strengths as a diplomat were his cool approach to any crisis and his quiet determination to see things through. But he was a man of many parts, whose languages included not only Somali but French, Portuguese, Swahili and Thai. He could also get by in Arabic and Urdu.

— The Times

Diplomatic posts
Preceded by John Bushell	British Ambassador to Vietnam; 1975–1976	Succeeded by Robert Tesh
Preceded by Donald Cape	British Ambassador to Laos; 1978–1980	Succeeded by Bernard Dobbs
Preceded by Achilles Papadopoulos	British Ambassador to Mozambique; 1980–1984	Succeeded by James Allan
Preceded by Sir John Nicholas	British High Commissioner to Sri Lanka; 1984–1987	Succeeded by David Gladstone
