= John Nicholas (diplomat) =

British diplomat (1924–2019)

Sir John Nicholas KCVO CMG

British High Commissioner to Sri Lanka
- In office 1979–1984
- Preceded by: David Aiers
- Succeeded by: John Stewart

Personal details
- Born: 13 December 1924 Worcester, England
- Died: 15 February 2019 (aged 94)
- Children: 2
- Education: University of Birmingham
- Occupation: Civil servant and diplomat

Sir John William Nicholas (13 December 1924 – 15 February 2019) was a British civil servant and diplomat who served as High Commissioner to Sri Lanka from 1979 to 1984.

== Early life and education ==
Nicholas was born on 13 December 1924 in Worcester, the son of Harry Nicholas, a butcher, and Gladys née Taylor. He was educated at Holly Lodge Grammar School and the University of Birmingham where he took a degree in History.

== Career ==
After serving during World War II with the 7th Rajput Regiment, Indian Army from 1944 to 1947, Nicholas joined the civil service and worked in the War Office until 1957. That year he transferred to the Commonwealth Relations Office (later the Foreign and Commonwealth Office) and was posted as first secretary to the British High Commission in Kuala Lumpur where he served from 1957 to 1961.

After two years working at the Commonwealth Relations Office (Economic Division), Nicholas went to Malawi as deputy High Commissioner and helped establish the British High Commission after the country gained its independence. He was also involved in the negotiations with Ian Smith which ultimately failed to persuade him against unilaterally declaring Rhodesian independence. From 1967 to 1969, he worked as a diplomatic service inspector before he was appointed counsellor (commercial) and deputy High Commissioner to Ceylon, remaining in the post from 1970 to 1971.

Nicholas then served in the Commonwealth Secretariat as director of its Establishments and Finance Division from 1971 to 1973, and from 1973 to 1974 was Head of the Pacific Dependent Territories Department at the Foreign and Commonwealth Office. From 1973 to 1974, he served as deputy high commissioner at Calcutta, and from 1974 to 1976 as consul-general at Melbourne. In 1979, he was appointed High Commissioner to Sri Lanka and also Ambassador (non-resident) to the Republic of the Maldives, a post he held until his retirement in 1984. A highlight of his tenure was the Queen's state visit to Sri Lanka in 1981 which was followed later that year by a knighthood.

In retirement, Nicholas continued to maintain ties with Sri Lanka as consultant with Cable and Wireless Communications and with his work with the Lennox-Boyd Memorial Trust. According to The Times, during his two postings, he "developed a deep affection for Sri Lanka and its people", and enjoyed a close relationship with the country's president, Junius Jayewardene.

== Personal life and death ==
Nicholas married twice. First, in 1944 to Rita Jones and they had two sons. After she died in 2000, he married Diana Grigson née Mackwood in 2002.

Nicholas died on 15 February 2019, aged 94.

== Honours ==
Nicholas was appointed Companion of the Order of St Michael and St George (CMG) in the 1979 Birthday Honours. He was appointed Knight Commander of the Royal Victorian Order (KCVO) in 1981.

== See also ==
- Sri Lanka–United Kingdom relations

Diplomatic posts
Preceded by David Aiers	British High Commissioner to Sri Lanka; 1979–1984	Succeeded by John Stewart
