= List of high commissioners of the United Kingdom to the Bahamas =

The high commissioner of the United Kingdom to the Bahamas is the United Kingdom's foremost diplomatic representative to the Commonwealth of The Bahamas.

== History ==
From Bahamian independence in 1973 until 2005 there were resident high commissioners to the Bahamas. In June 2005 the high commission in Nassau was closed and responsibility for the Bahamas was assumed by the British high commission in Kingston, Jamaica, the high commissioner to Jamaica was also accredited to the Bahamas. However, the high commission in Nassau is to reopened in 2019 with a resident high commissioner.

== List of heads of mission ==
=== High commissioners to the Bahamas ===
- 1973–1975: Charles Treadwell
- 1973–1978: Peter Mennell
- 1978–1981: John Duncan
- 1981–1983: Achilles Papadopoulos
- 1983–1986: Peter Heap
- 1986–1991: Colin Mays
- 1991–1992: Michael Gore
- 1992–1996: Brian Attewell
- 1996–1999: Peter Young
- 1999–2003: Peter Heigl
- 2003–2005: Roderick Gemmell
- 2005–2009: Jeremy Cresswell (non-resident)
- 2010–2013: Howard Drake (non-resident)
- 2013–2017: David Fitton (non-resident)
- 2017–2019: Asif Ahmad (non-resident)
- 2019–2022: Sarah Dickson
- 2022–2025: Tom Hartley
- 2025–present: Smita Rossetti
