= Stephen Wright (diplomat) =

British diplomat

Sir Stephen John Leadbetter Wright, KCMG (born 7 December 1946) is a retired British diplomat who was Chief Executive Officer of International Financial Services London from 2008 to 2010 and is currently a Senior Adviser to Mitsui & Co.

Born in Quito, Ecuador, Wright was educated at Shrewsbury School and Queen's College, Oxford, where he read modern history. He joined HM Diplomatic Service in 1968 and served in Havana, New York, Brussels, New Delhi, and Washington, D.C. He was Director for European Union Affairs at the Foreign and Commonwealth Office (FCO) 1994–1996, deputy Under-Secretary at the FCO from 2000 to 2002, and Ambassador to Spain and the Principality of Andorra 2003–2007.

Since retiring from the Diplomatic Service in 2007, Wright has been a senior adviser to the Good Governance Group as well as CEO of International Financial Services London 2008–2010, senior adviser to TheCityUK 2010–11, and Senior Adviser to Mitsui & Co Europe plc since 2008.

Wright became a trustee of the Zurbaran Trust, part of the Auckland Project, in 2016; and Hon Secretary of the Pilgrims Society of Great Britain in 2017.

Soon after joining the diplomatic service, Wright married Georgina Butler, and they had a son and a daughter. The marriage was dissolved in 2000. In 2002 he married Elizabeth Abbott (Abbey) Rosemont.

Wright's recreations are music, opera, art, and rowing.
