= Humphry Davy School =

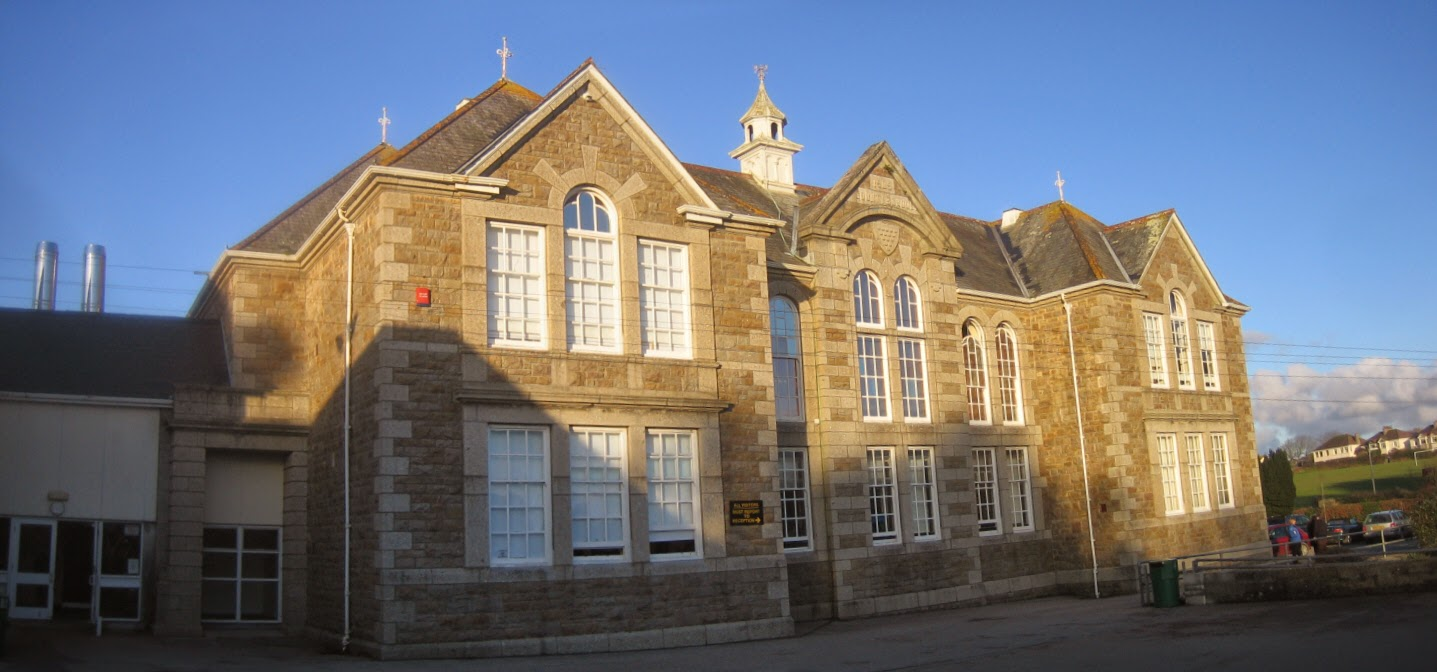

Location
- Coombe Road; Penzance, Cornwall, TR18 2TG; England; 50°07′27″N 5°32′27″W

Information
- Type: Foundation school
- Motto: Raising Aspirations | Achieving Excellence
- Local authority: Cornwall Council
- Specialist: Music
- Department for Education URN: 112067 Tables
- Ofsted: Reports
- Chair of Governors: K. Uren
- Headteacher: W. Marshall
- Gender: Coeducational
- Age: 11 to 16
- Enrolment: 687
- Houses: Kemeneth, Sowena, Aweni, Tevi, Medra, Longya
- Colours: Purple, Green, Blue, Orange, Yellow, Silver
- Website: http://www.humphry-davy.cornwall.sch.uk

Humphry Davy School is a comprehensive school in Penzance, Cornwall, England. The school teaches 11 to 16-year-olds.

== History ==
The oldest part of the main school building was completed in 1909. It was originally called the Penzance County School and opened with an enrolment of 130 boys on 24 January 1910. It later became known as the Humphry Davy Grammar School for Boys.

It shared a canteen with the Penzance Girls Grammar School (PGGS), further up the hill, and, in the late 1970s, a joint upper sixth form block was added on the playing fields to the North East of the school, South West of PGGS. In 1980 it merged with PGGS and Lescudjack schools, becoming a co-educational comprehensive school, with the name Humphry Davy School.

== Notable former pupils ==
- Helen Glover (rower), Olympic gold medal and World Champion rower
- Sam Palladio, Actor and musician

=== Humphry Davy Grammar School for Boys ===
- Francis Foster Barham, religious writer known as the 'Alist'
- Sir David Collins, educational administrator
- Michael Grandage, theatre director, Tony Award winner
- Alexander Halliday, British geochemist
- Quinton Quayle, Ambassador to Thailand since 2007, and to Romania from 2002 to 2006
- Jack Richards, Surrey and England cricketer
