= David Collins (educational administrator) =

British educationalist (1949–2019)

Sir David John Collins CBE FRSA (13 November 1949 – 14 February 2019) was a British educationalist.

== Education ==
After attending Humphry Davy Grammar School in Penzance, Collins went to the University of Edinburgh, graduating with a Scottish Master of Arts degree in 1972 and then completing a doctorate (PhD), awarded in 1977 for a thesis entitled "Adult education and the community in the Scottish new towns".

== Career and later life ==
After working as an education coordinator with HM Prison Edinburgh, in 1975 Collins began working for Redditch College as a Head of Department. In 1985 he became the college's Development Officer, but in 1988 moved to Sandwell College as Vice-Principal. From 1993 to 2009, he was Principal and Chief Executive of South Cheshire College and then Chief Executive of the Learning and Skills Improvement Service, before becoming, in 2011, Principal of Guildford College. For the 2008–09 year, he was president of the Association of Colleges.

In 2013, he left Guildford College and became the government's Further Education Commissioner, serving until 2016, when Richard Atkins and took over from him. He received a knighthood for his service in 2016, having been appointed a Commander of the Order of the British Empire (CBE) in 2005. It was revealed before he left the office that he had been working twice the number of days per week than had originally been advertised in 2013, and that he earned £494,400 plus expenses over the three years he was commissioner.

Collins died on 14 February 2019.
