= Peter Mathers (diplomat) =

British diplomat (born 1946)

British High Commissioner to Jamaica
- In office 2002–2005
- Monarch: Elizabeth II
- Prime Minister: Tony Blair
- Preceded by: Antony Smith
- Succeeded by: Howard Drake

Personal details
- Born: 2 April 1946 (age 80)

Peter Mathers CVO (born 2 April 1946) is a British former diplomat who was High Commissioner to Jamaica from 2002 to 2005.

== Education ==
Mathers was educated at Bradfield College and the Open University

== Career ==
After an Army Short Service Commission, Mathers joined HM Diplomatic Service in 1971. He served in Tehran, Bonn, and Copenhagen before a secondment to the UN Office in Vienna. He was Deputy High Commissioner for Barbados and the Eastern Caribbean from 1995 to 1998; Counsellor in Stockholm from 1998 to 2002; and High Commissioner to Jamaica and the Commonwealth of the Bahamas from 2005 to 2009.

Diplomatic posts
Preceded by Antony Smith	British High Commissioner to Jamaica; 2002–2005	Succeeded by Jeremy Cresswell
