= Stansell =

Stansell is a surname. Notable people with the surname include:

- John Lawrence Stansell (1875–1956), a Conservative member of the Canadian House of Commons
- Keith Stansell, American who was held hostage by the Revolutionary Armed Forces of Colombia

== See also ==
- Stansel
