= Achilles Papadopoulos =

British diplomat (1923–1996)

Achilles Papadopoulos CMG LVO MBE

High Commissioner of the United Kingdom to the Bahamas
- In office 1981–1983
- Preceded by: John Duncan
- Succeeded by: Peter Heap

British Ambassador to Mozambique
- In office 1979–1980
- Preceded by: John Lewen
- Succeeded by: John Stewart

British Ambassador to El Salvador
- In office 1977–1979
- Preceded by: Albert Hughes
- Succeeded by: Colum Sharkey

Personal details
- Born: 16 August 1923
- Died: 29 July 1996 (aged 72)
- Children: 3
- Occupation: Diplomat

Achilles Symeon Papadopoulos (16 August 1923 – 29 July 1996) was a Cypriot diplomat who served as high commissioner of the United Kingdom to the Bahamas, British ambassador to Mozambique, and British ambassador to El Salvador.

== Early life and education ==
Papadopoulos was born in Cyprus on 16 August 1923, the son of Symeon and Polyxene Papadopoulos. He was educated at The English School, Nicosia, Cyprus.

== Career ==
After working with the British military administration in Eritrea in 1943, Papadopoulos joined the United Kingdom Overseas Civil Service in 1953 in Cyprus. There he spent six years as an administrative officer during the time of the Cyprus Emergency and was made a MBE. While serving he received personal threats from EOKA guerrillas, and was shot at on three occasions, necessitating departure from the island for his safety. According to The Times, "But he survived all this with a notable aplomb and resilience which won him widespread admiration from his colleagues."

In 1959, he was transferred to Dar es Salaam and then to Malta in 1961 where, after spending four years there, he was formally accepted into the Diplomatic Service. In 1965, he was sent to Nairobi as director of British information services, before he joined the Foreign and Commonwealth Office in London in 1968. After postings in Colombo in 1971 and Washington in 1974 as counsellor (information), he was posted to Havana as counsellor and head of chancery.

He then served as ambassador to El Salvador from 1977 to 1979 at a time of severe political conflict including frequent kidnappings. Two British bankers were abducted and the Embassy itself was threatened. At the time of their release Papadopoulos was on leave while Embassy staff had been sent to a neighbouring country for their safety. In what was described as a "major diplomatic row", Papadopoulos, who was only halfway through his term of office, was reassigned to a new position as ambassador to Mozambique. After a year in the position, he was appointed high commissioner of the United Kingdom to the Bahamas in 1981, a post he held until his retirement in 1983.

== Personal life and death ==
Papadopoulos married Joyce Martin née Stark in 1954, a hospital matron from Edinburgh, whom he met while she was working in Cyprus, and they had one son and two daughters.

Papadopoulos died on 29 July 1996, aged 72.

== Honours ==
- Companion of the Order of St Michael and St George (CMG) in the 1980 New Year Honours.
- Lieutenant of the Royal Victorian Order in (LVO) in 1972
- Member of the Order of the British Empire (MBE) in the 1954 Birthday Honours.

== See also ==
- The Bahamas–United Kingdom relations
- Mozambique–United Kingdom relations
- El Salvador–United Kingdom relations

Diplomatic posts
Preceded by Albert Hughes	British Ambassador to El Salvador; 1977–1979	Succeeded by Colum Sharkey
Preceded by John Lewen	British Ambassador to Mozambique; 1979–1980	Succeeded by John Stewart
Preceded by John Duncan	High Commissioner of the United Kingdom to the Bahamas; 1981–1983	Succeeded by Peter Heap
