= Georgina Butler =

British diplomat (born 1945)

Georgina Susan Butler (born 30 November 1945) is a retired British diplomat. After postings at the Foreign Office, UKREP in Brussels, the European Commission, and in Washington D.C., she served as British Ambassador to Costa Rica and to Nicaragua.

She later stood unsuccessfully for the European Parliament as a Conservative and was a Special Representative of the Foreign Secretary.

== Early life ==
A daughter of Alfred Norman Butler of Torquay and his wife Joan Mary Harrington, Butler was educated at Torquay Grammar School for Girls and then from 1964 to 1968 at University College London, where she was Vice-President of the UCL Union in 1966–1967 and graduated LL.B.

== Diplomatic career ==
In the autumn of 1968, soon after graduating from London University, Butler joined the diplomatic service as a Branch A cadet. Within months, she was given a posting to the British Embassy, Paris, but resigned in 1970 to marry a fellow diplomat, Stephen Wright, who had been posted to Cuba. At the time, there was a marriage bar for women diplomats, and Butler worked unpaid at the embassy in Havana until 1971, when she was re-employed by the Foreign and Commonwealth Office (FCO) on contract. In 1972 Butler was reinstated in Branch A and appointed to the FCO’s South European department. In 1975, she was appointed to UKREP in Brussels and in 1982 was seconded to the European Commission, returning to the FCO in 1985. In 1999, she was serving alongside her husband at the British Embassy, Washington D.C. She then had a further FCO posting as Deputy Head of its Latin American and Caribbean department. At the pinnacle of her career, she served as Ambassador to Costa Rica from February 2002 to 2006 and also as Ambassador to Nicaragua from 2004 to 2006. These were her last diplomatic appointments, although it had been announced in May that she would be transferring to another posting.

While ambassador in Costa Rica, Butler was reported to be "the most visible member of the diplomatic corps". She climbed Mount Chirripó, rode in rodeos, dived from Cocos Island, and in period costume re-enacted the landing of Sir Francis Drake in Bahía Drake.

In November 2004 she flew into Nicaragua to help to liaise with searchers looking for a missing British walker.

On 9 November 2005, in a statement to the House of Commons, Norman Baker said

I want to put on record that we have an exceedingly effective ambassador in Georgina Butler who now covers both countries. I found it extremely refreshing to see the way in which she was able to undertake her duties in both countries. She was refreshingly unstuffy compared with some in the Foreign Office—I am not referring to the Minister—and the more ambassadors we have like her, the better. She does a great deal to enhance Britain's reputation in those countries.

== Later career ==
In 2003, Butler was elected as a Fellow of University College London, and in 2010 became chairman of its Denys Holland Scholarship Fund.

In 2006, Butler was invited by David Cameron to join his A-List of preferred Conservative candidates. In October 2013, she was announced as one of those standing for the party in the European Parliament election of 2014 in South West England, together with Ashley Fox, Julie Girling, James Cracknell, Sophia Swire, and Melissa Maynard. Butler said during the campaign that she hoped her experience of diplomacy would give her a stronger hand in helping with Cameron's renegotiation of Britain's EU membership and delivering a referendum on it in 2017, if the Conservatives were to win the next general election.

The UK Independence Party ran strongly in South West England, gaining 51,000 more votes than the Conservatives. Two of its candidates, William Dartmouth and Julia Reid, were elected as Members of the European Parliament, and at number 4 on the Conservative party list, Butler was unsuccessful.

In 2017 Butler was chairman of the Richmond Park and North Kingston Conservative Association and publicly welcomed the re-selection of Zac Goldsmith. She continued in office until 2019.

In December 2019, she was appointed as a Special Representative of the Foreign Secretary for greeting Heads of State and overseas government visitors on arrival in the United Kingdom.

== Personal life ==
From her marriage to Stephen Wright in 1970, Butler has a daughter, born in 1977, and a son, born in 1979. She and her husband were divorced in 2000.

Butler married again while serving in Costa Rica. Her husband, Robert Kelly, a retired Canadian foreign-service officer, then worked without pay as project manager for medical clinics in Costa Rica funded from the British embassy.
