= Sophia Swire =

British businesswoman

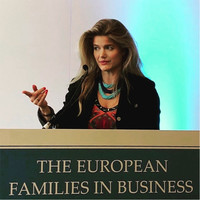
- Swire speaking at a conference in 2019
- Born: London, England
- Education: Manchester University
- Political party: Conservative
- Relatives: Hugo Swire
- Website: http://www.sophiaswire.com

Sophia Swire is a British social entrepreneur and impact venture capitalist with a focus on gender, climate and sustainability.

== Early life ==
Sophia Swire is the daughter of Humphrey Roger Swire, a director of Sotheby's, and descendant of Sir John Swire. Through her mother, Philippa, The Dowager Marchioness Townshend, daughter of Colonel George Jardine Kidston Montgomerie of Southannan who married secondly George Townshend, 7th Marquess Townshend, she is descended from William the Conqueror, Mary, Queen of Scots and Oliver Cromwell. She has three brothers: Mark, Philip and Hugo Swire, Baron Swire, a member of the House of Lords and former Minister of State at the Foreign and Commonwealth Office.

Swire was raised in Britain and educated at Queen's Gate School in London, and at the University of Manchester, where she graduated in 1986 with a bachelor's degree with honours in the History of Art with Italian.

== Career ==
In the late 1980s, Swire worked in the City of London in equity analysis and for Kleinwort Benson in institutional equity sales. She left banking after Black Monday (1987) to found a non-profit, Learning for Life .

In 1990, she became noted for selling pashmina shawls through her sustainable fashion brand, after seeing them worn by Bollywood stars at a fund-raising benefit of Imran Khan's in Lahore, then finding a source for the shawls at a Himalayan workshop in Nepal.

In 1993, Swire co-founded Learning for Life, an educational charity, acting as a trustee and chairing its board from 1995 to 2000. This established over 200 schools for girls in rural Afghanistan, Pakistan, and India, an achievement for which she was awarded the 2010 Award for Empowering Women in Pakistan.

In 2008, at the invitation of Rory Stewart and the Turquoise Mountain Foundation, she returned to Afghanistan to establish a school for jewellers and gem-cutters at Turquoise Mountain. The first students graduated in 2010.

In 2010, Swire became the senior gemstones advisor to the Afghan Ministry of Mines and Petroleum, with funding from the World Bank.

In 2012, Swire established Future Brilliance, non-profit offering workplace skills and enterprise development training with a focus on Afghan women. She worked to revive the jewellery industry in gemstone-rich areas of Afghanistan. The first Future Brilliance Afghanistan project trained 36 Afghan gem-cutting and jewellery artisans in Jaipur, India, and assisted them in forming Afghanistan's first jewellery co-operative and brand, Aayenda Jewelry. Future Brilliance successfully delivered the first Digital Literacy training project in Afghanistan, in 2013, funded by the Canadian Fund for Local Initiatives (CFLI).

In October 2013, Swire was announced as a Conservative candidate in the European Parliament election of 2014 in South West England and Gibraltar, together with Ashley Fox, Julie Girling, James Cracknell, Georgina Butler, and Melissa Maynard. The names were confirmed when nominations were lodged in April 2014. Swire said during the campaign that her financial background would enable her to get value for money from the European Union for causes in the region and for protecting the United Kingdom as Europe's principal financial centre. She also wished to develop policy to address the growing refugee crisis and tackle the rise of radical extremism.

In August 2021, following the fall of Kabul to the Taliban, Swire recruited 170 volunteers from her GEDI.VC network to launch a Task Force for Future Brilliance. Together with her team, she provided support to over 1500 Afghans, evacuating several hundred women and their families to safety. Among the women she evacuated, was Sharbat Gula, the famous National Geographic "green-eyed Afghan girl", whom she rescued at the request of Steve and Bonnie McCurry, and evacuated with the support of the distinguished Italian diplomat and head of the Italian Secret Service, Elisabetta Belloni. They were evacuated to a Future Brilliance safehouse for asylum seekers in Pakistan, where Afghan women were taught ICT and computer skills, digital literacy and English language and Afghan child refugees were taught maths, science and robotics.

Swire created and produced the documentary film, Burning Man: Art on Fire. She co-produced the BBC Inside Story film, Smoke Rings. She also produced the Channel Four documentary Mr Jinnah: the Making of Pakistan. On behalf of Global Witness, she contributed to the first Natural Resource Charter.

In 2015, she spoke at the United Nations in New York on Women's Entrepreneurship Day.
