= List of ambassadors of the United Kingdom to Laos =

The ambassador of the United Kingdom to Laos is the United Kingdom's foremost diplomatic representative to the Lao People's Democratic Republic. After autonomy from France in 1949, the post was initially carried out on a non-resident basis in conjunction with British ambassador to Vietnam. From 1955 until 1985 there was a full ambassador to the Republic, then until 2012 the post was combined with that of British ambassador to Thailand. The official title is His Britannic Majesty's Ambassador to the Lao People's Democratic Republic or HMA Vientiane. From October 2012, the United Kingdom once again has a resident ambassador in Vientiane.

== Non-resident ambassadors to Laos (and ambassador to Vietnam) ==
- 1951–(1955): Sir Hubert Graves

== Ambassadors to Laos ==
- 1954–1956: The Lord Talbot de Malahide CMG
- 1956–1958: Leonard Holliday CMG
- 1958–1960: Sir Anthony Lincoln KCMG CVO
- 1960–1962: Sir John Addis KCMG
- 1962–1965: Sir Donald Hopson KCMG DSO MC TD
- 1965–1967: Sir Frederick Warner GVCO KCMG
- 1967–1970: Sir Harold Smedley KCMG MBE
- 1970–1973: John Lloyd CBE
- 1973–1975: Alan Davidson CMG
- 1976–1978: Donald Cape CMG
- 1978–1980: John Stewart CMG OBE
- 1982–1985: Bernard Dobbs

== Non-resident ambassadors to Laos (and ambassador to Thailand) ==
- (1981)–1986: Justin Staples CMG
- 1986–1989: Derek Tonkin CMG
- 1989–1992: Sir Ramsay Melhuish KBE CMG
- 1992–1996: Christian Adams CMG
- 1996–2000: Sir James Hodge KCVO CMG
- 2000–2003: Barney Smith CMG
- 2003–2007: David Fall CMG
- 2007–2010: Quinton Quayle
- 2010–2012: Asif Ahmad

== Ambassadors to Laos ==
- 2012–2015: Philip Malone
- 2015–2019: Hugh Evans
- 2019–2023: John Pearson
- 2023–present: Melanie Barlow
