= Nigel Steward =

British diplomat (1899–1991)

Nigel Oliver Willoughby Steward, OBE (16 October 1899 – 13 May 1991) was a British diplomat who served as British Minister to Paraguay and to Nicaragua.

== Biography ==
The son of Arthur Bennett Steward, ICS, and Alice Willoughby, Steward was educated at Winchester College (where he was a Scholar) and Trinity College, Oxford.

He entered HM Consular Service in 1924, and was successively Vice-Consul in San Francisco in 1926, in Valparaiso in 1930, in Guatemala (with the local rank of Second Secretary in the Foreign Service) in 1933, and Paris in 1937. He was promoted to Consul (with the local rank of First Secretary in the Diplomatic Service) at Montevideo in 1938.

Seward was appointed British Envoy Extraordinary and Minister Plenipotentiary to Paraguay in 1944, then transferred to Bucharest as First Secretary in 1946. The same year, he was promoted to Promoted to be Foreign Service Officer, Grade 6 and appointed Deputy Consul-General at New York in 1946–48. He was British Minister to Nicaragua in 1948–52, Consul-General at Nice and Monaco in 1952–55, and Consul-General at Haifa in 1955–59. He was appointed an OBE in 1946.

He married Raquel Wyneken in 1933; they had three daughters.
