= Raymond Grady Stansel =

Raymond Grady Stansel Jr. was an American drug smuggler who faked his death in 1974 and lived in Australia for more than forty years.

Stansel was arrested in Florida in 1974 with 12-tons of marijuana. On the first day of his trial, his lawyer told the judge he had drowned in a diving accident in Nicaragua. Stansel was never found. In 2015, an American expat in Australia named Dennis "Lee" Lafferty died in a traffic accident. His widow revealed that Lafferty was Stansel.

Stansel lived in far north Queensland, Australia and was a respected member of the Daintree community. He operated Daintree River Cruise Centre for over 28 years, giving crocodile tours.
