= List of ambassadors of Haiti to the United Kingdom =

The ambassador of Haiti to the United Kingdom is the chief diplomatic representative of the government of the Republic of Haiti to the government of the United Kingdom. The ambassador's office is located at the Embassy of Haiti in London.

== List of representatives ==
Diplomatic agrément	Diplomatic accreditation	Ambassador	Observations	List of heads of state of Haiti	List of presidents of the United States	Term end	Notes
	March 19, 1870	Brismard Brice	Also assigned to Spain and France.			May 19, 1874	
	1892	Clement Haentjens				1893	
	1894	Louis-Joseph Janvier				1903	
		Anténor Firmin					
		Stephen Alexis					
		Léon Laleau					
		Claude Auguste					
	2016-2018	Bocchit Edmond		Jocelerme Privert, Jovenel Moïse			
	2020	Euvrard Saint Amand		Jovenel Moïse, Claude Joseph, Ariel Henry, Transitional Presidential Council	Donald Trump, Joe Biden		
