= Giles Frederick Squire =

British diplomat (1894–1959)

Sir Giles Frederick Squire, KBE, CIE (12 October 1894 - 11 April 1959) was a British colonial civil servant and diplomat. He was British Envoy to Afghanistan from 1943 to 1948 and Ambassador from 1948 to 1949.
