= Ronald Peter Nash =

British diplomat

Ronald Peter Nash CMG (born 18 September 1946) is a British diplomat who served as Ambassador to Afghanistan from 2002 to 2003. He was appointed Companion of the Order of St Michael and St George (CMG) in the 2004 New Year Honours.
