= John Drinkall =

British diplomat

British Ambassador to Afghanistan
- In office 1972–1976
- Preceded by: Peers Carter
- Succeeded by: Kenneth Crook

Personal details
- Born: 1 January 1922
- Died: 30 May 2015 (aged 93)

John Kenneth Drinkall, CMG (1 January 1922 – 30 May 2015) was a British diplomat. Educated at Haileybury and Imperial Service College and Brasenose College, Oxford, he was Ambassador to Afghanistan from 1972 to 1976. From 1976 to 1981 he was High Commissioner to Jamaica and non-resident Ambassador to Haiti. He died on 30 May 2015 at the age of 93.
