= Sharon Campbell =

British diplomat

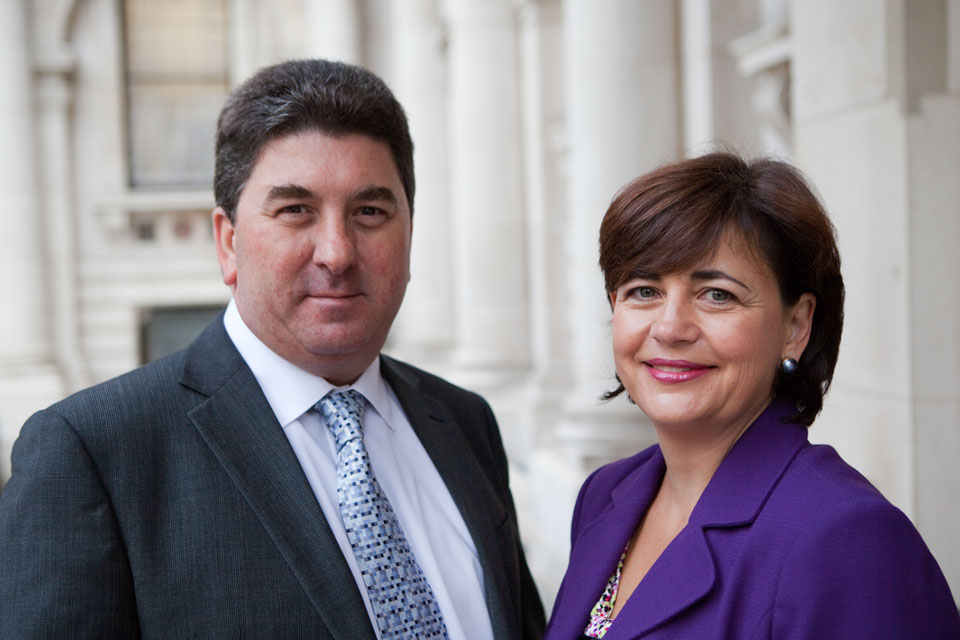
- Campbell and her husband Chris

British Ambassador to Haiti
- In office 2015–2020
- Preceded by: Steven Fisher
- Succeeded by: Mockbul Ali

British Ambassador to Costa Rica
- In office 2011–2015
- Preceded by: Thomas Kennedy
- Succeeded by: Ross Denny

Sharon Isabel Campbell is a British diplomat who was British Ambassador to Costa Rica from 2011 to 2015 and British Ambassador to Haiti from 2015 until 2020.

Campbell joined the Foreign and Commonwealth Office in 1983 and worked in London in its Trade Relations Department, Finance Directorate, and Consular Directorate, as well as in a minister’s private offices. She was posted overseas to the British Embassies in Poland, Bangladesh, Indonesia, Venezuela, and Belgium and served as Ambassador to Costa Rica from 2011 to 2015 and to Haiti from October 2015 until August 2020.

From 2011 to 2016, she was also non-resident ambassador to Nicaragua, where the British embassy had been closed in 2004.

Campbell married Chris Campbell in 1989, and they were the first married couple ever to be ambassadors to neighbouring countries. They speak Spanish, French, Arabic, and Indonesian. In May 2015, they spoke about job sharing in the world of diplomacy.
