= David Duncan (diplomat) =

British diplomat (1923–2007)

8th United Kingdom Ambassador to Nicaragua
- In office 1974–1976
- Preceded by: Ivor Vincent
- Succeeded by: Keith Hamylton Jones

Personal details
- Born: 22 February 1923 Exeter, United Kingdom
- Died: 31 August 2007 (aged 84)
- Education: Eton College
- Alma mater: Trinity College, Cambridge
- Profession: Diplomat

David Francis Duncan (22 February 1923 – 31 August 2007) was a British diplomat. During World War II he was an officer in the Royal Artillery and was mentioned in dispatches. After the war he entered the Diplomatic Service and served both as the 8th United Kingdom Ambassador to Nicaragua from 1974 to 1976 and as British counsellor to the Disarmament Conference from 1971 to 1974.

Duncan was serving in the British embassy in Baghdad (Iraq) in July 1958 when there was a violent revolution. The King and his leading advisers were murdered, and a mob attacked the British embassy. Duncan drove to the embassy that day, only to discover that the residency was on fire, and that there were tanks and a mob in the street outside, which then turned on him. His Iraqi passenger, his cook Rashid, promptly jumped out of the car, saying, "I'm leaving you now, Sahib". Duncan did a rapid u-turn and sped off, but a few minutes later he got stuck in heavy traffic. An Iraqi on foot stuck his head through the open window, and the following conversation ensued: Iraqi: "Where are you going?" Duncan: "I'm going home." Iraqi: "Are you English?" Duncan: "No, I'm Scottish." Iraqi (temporarily non-plussed): "We killing all English, French and Americans." Happily, Duncan was able to drive home unmolested.
