= Kenneth Crook =

British diplomat

Kenneth Roy Crook CMG (30 July 1920 – 24 July 2012) was a British diplomat.

He was Governor of the Cayman Islands from 1971 to 1974, and Ambassador to Afghanistan from 1976 to 1979.

He was named Companion of the Order of St Michael and St George (CMG) in 1977.
