= William Marsden (diplomat) =

British diplomat (1940–2019)

William Marsden (15 September 1940 – 12 October 2019) was a British diplomat who served as the United Kingdom's Ambassador to Argentina from 1997 to 2000, and to Costa Rica and Nicaragua concurrently from 1989 to 1992. From 2001 his work was primarily concerned with nature conservation, and he latterly served as Chairman of the Chagos Conservation Trust.

== Biography ==
Marsden studied history and economics at Cambridge and London Universities and joined the Foreign Office in 1963. For much of the 1960s and 1970s his career was concerned with strategic "East-West" relations, in the UK Delegation to NATO, the Foreign and Commonwealth Office (FCO) and the British Embassy, Moscow (1976 to 79).

After a secondment in the British Engineering industry, he specialised in the United Kingdom’s role in the European Community, first from 1979 as Assistant Head, European Community Department (FCO) and then as Counsellor in the UK Representation to the European Community in Brussels (1981–85).

In a change of geographical focus, Marsden was appointed Head of the FCO’s East Africa Department from 1985, covering also the Indian Ocean. In that capacity he served as Commissioner of the British Indian Ocean Territory.

The focus of the last 15 years of his diplomatic career was the Americas: Ambassador in Central America during the successful efforts to find political solutions to the regional conflicts; Minister (trade) in the British Embassy in Washington; Director, Americas in the FCO (1994 to 97); and Ambassador to Argentina.

Marsden's concern for action on nature conservation developed through experience with the modest but worthwhile British Government contribution on environmental issues in the Americas. In later years he also served as Chairman of the Anglo-Central American Society, UK Trustee of the World Cancer Research Fund and was active in the work of the English-Speaking Union.

== Personal ==
Marsden was born in Cambridge to Ruth Marsden (née Kershaw) and Christopher Marsden. He was married to Kaia Marsden (née Collingham), with whom he had two children, Inge and Thomas.
