= Noel Larmour =

Irish cricketer and politician

Sir Edward Noel "Nick" Larmour KCMG (25 December 1916 in Belfast, Ireland – 21 August 1999 in Belfast) was an Irish cricketer and British diplomat.

== Cricket ==
A right-handed batsman, he played five times for the Ireland cricket team in 1938. He made his debut for Ireland against Scotland in July 1938, which was his only first-class match. He also played against the MCC and Sir Julien Cahn's XI before finishing his cricket career with two matches against Australia in September.

== Politics ==
After leaving military service in 1946, he married his wife Nancy, and became Deputy Secretary to the government of Burma in Rangoon. He was in the next room when Aung San and six members of the Burma cabinet were assassinated on 19 July 1947. He left Burma in 1948 and joined the Commonwealth Relations Office, and had a series of overseas posts in New Zealand, Singapore, Australia, Nigeria and as High Commissioner to Jamaica between 1970 and 1973, also serving as ambassador to Haiti.

During his final years at the Foreign and Commonwealth Office, he facilitated the final moves towards independence of the New Hebrides, now Vanuatu, and other colonies, including the Solomon Islands. He was knighted on his retirement in 1977, but continued in some political roles, including the Price Commission, and a post in Bermuda. He died in Belfast whilst on a visit to his sister.

Diplomatic posts
Preceded by James Dalton Murray	High Commissioner to Jamaica; 1970–1973	Succeeded by John Dunn Herring
