= Volker Stanzel =

German diplomat (born 1948)

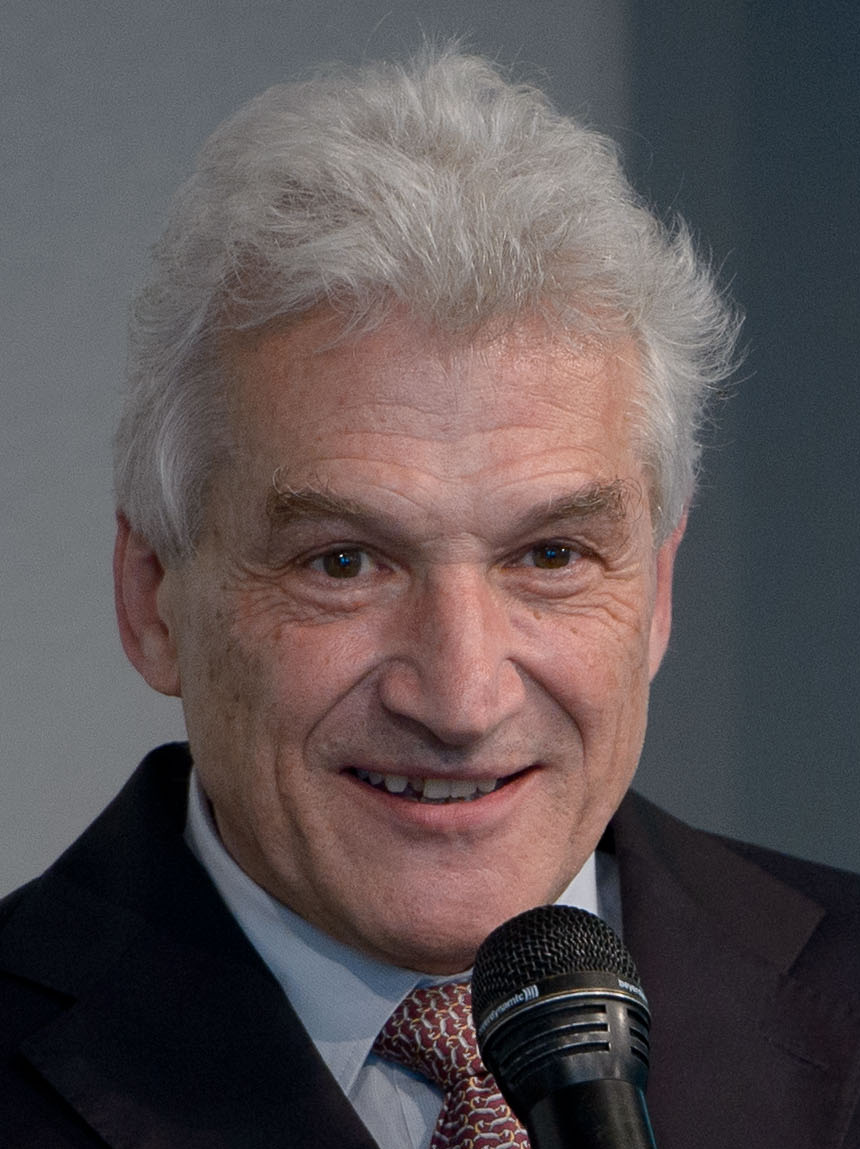
Volker Stanzel in 2015

Volker Stanzel (born 22 September 1948) is a retired German diplomat and the former ambassador of the Federal Republic of Germany to Japan and China as well as former Political Director. Since 2015 he works and publishes on political topics in Berlin, Germany.

He is married and has two children.

== Early life and education ==
Stanzel studied at the University of Frankfurt am Main between 1968 and 1972, majoring in Japanese and Chinese Studies as well as Political Science. During his undergraduate degree, he studied abroad at the University of Kyoto. In 1980, he received a Ph.D. in Japanese and Chinese Studies and Political Science from the University of Cologne.

== Career ==
Stanzel joined the Foreign Service of the Federal Republic of Germany in 1979 and began his career at the German embassy in Rome. There, and in his next post in Bonn, Stanzel worked in the Economics division. In Japan (1982-1985), he worked in the Press and Political Division and in Hungary in 1985, where he helped to prepare the first Conference on Security and Co-operation in Europe devoted to Culture.

From 1985 to 1987 Stanzel was the Chargé d'Affaires at the embassy in Aden, South Yemen. He then worked in the Economics Department of the Foreign Office in Bonn before becoming the Assistant European Correspondent in the Political Department. From 1990 to 1993, Stanzel was Director of Press and Information at the German Embassy in China. Subsequently, from 1993-1995 he was the head of the Operation Center in the Foreign Office in Bonn.

In 1995, Stanzel became foreign policy adviser for the Social Democratic Party of Germany in the German Bundestag. Between 1998 and 1999, he was a visiting fellow with the German Marshall Fund in Washington, D.C.

In 1999, Stanzel returned to Germany as Director of the Department for Non-Proliferation and Civilian Use of Nuclear Energy at the Foreign Office in Berlin. From 2001 to 2002, he was the Director for Asian and Pacific Affairs and from 2002 to 2004, the Director General for Political Affairs in charge of relations to the Asia-Pacific, the Near and Middle East, Africa and Latin America.

After 25 years in the Foreign Service, Stanzel became the ambassador of the Federal Republic of Germany to the People's Republic of China in 2004. In 2007, he was appointed Political Director of the German Foreign Service.

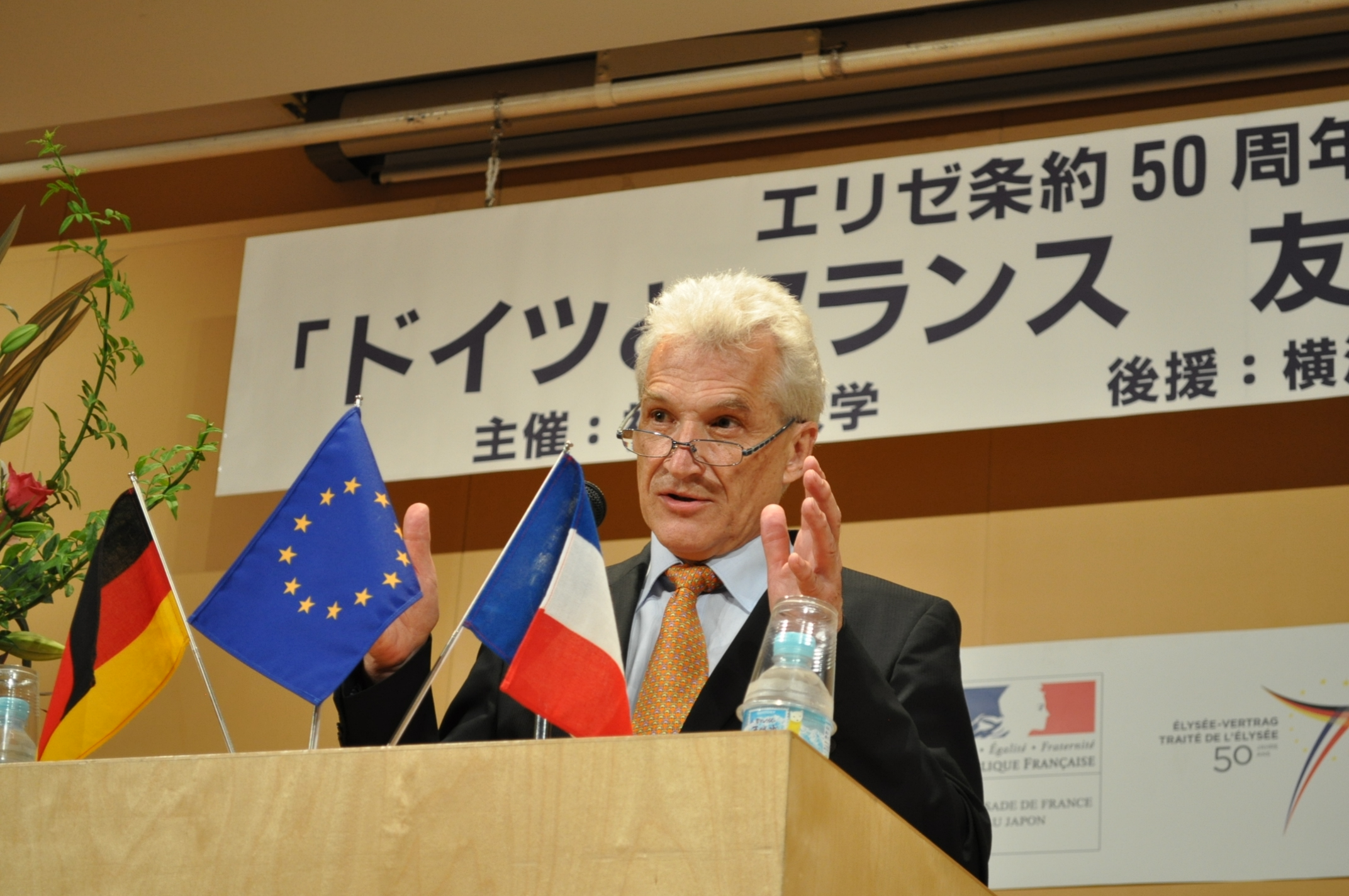
German Ambassador to Japan Volker Stanzel

In October 2009, Stanzel became the ambassador of the Federal Republic of Germany to Japan.

== Later career ==
Since retiring from the Foreign Service in October 2013, Stanzel has taught political science at Claremont McKenna College and at the University of California, Santa Cruz. In 2015 he returned to Berlin, Germany, where he worked on and taught Chinese-Japanese relations at Free University Berlin and began to pursue a - still ongoing - project on modern diplomacy as Senior Distinguished Fellow at the German Institute for International and Security Affairs(SWP). He was a Senior Advisor to the German Marshall Fund and is a Council Member of the European Council on Foreign Relations as well as of the Tibet Initiative Deutschland. He also is a Member of the Board of the Academic Confucius Institute at University of Göttingen and of the German-Japanese Business Council. 2018/2019 Volker Stanzel held the position of the Vice President of the German Council on Foreign Relations (DGAP). In June 2018 he became President of the Association of German-Japanese Societies.

Stanzel publishes frequently on foreign policy and issues of Asian politics. His last book "Die ratlose Außenpolitik and warum sie den Rückgalt der Gesellschaft braucht" ("Clueless Foeriegn Policy and Why It Needs the Backing of Society") was published in Spring 2019.

Stanzel joined the SPD in 1966 which he left in 2013 after the decision to enter into another Grand Coalition with the CDU/CSU. He was awarded the Order of Merit of the Federal Republic of Germany first class.

== Publications ==
=== Books ===
- Die ratlose Außenpolitik und warum sie den Rückhalt der Gesellschaft braucht. Bonn: Verlag J.H.W. Dietz Nachf., 2019
- (Ed.:) Die neue Wirklichkeit der Außenpolitik. Diplomatie im 21. Jahrhundert. Andrássy Studien zur Europaforschung, Band 24, Nomos Verlagsgesellschaft, 2019
- (Ed.:) New Realities in Foreign Affairs. Diplomacy in the 21st Century. Andrássy Studien zur Europaforschung, Band 24, Nomos Verlagsgesellschaft, 2019
- Watanabe-sensei, Nihonjin ni totte tenno wa do iu sonzai desuka? Tokyo: Gentosha, 2017 (in Japanese)
- Aussöhnung und Gesellschaft. Zur Überwindung kollektiv erlebten Leids. SWP-Studien 2016/S 11, Juni 2016
- Aus der Zeit gefallen. Der Tenno im 21. Jahrhundert. OAG-Taschenbuch Nr. 103. Tokyo: Judicium (Deutsche Gesellschaft für Natur- und Völkerkunde Ostasiens), 2016.
- Doitsu-taishi mo nattoku shita, Nihon ga sekai de aisareru riyu. Tokyo: Gentosha, 2015, (in Japanese).
- Chinas Außenpolitik. Wege einer widerwilligen Weltmacht, München/Wien: Oldenbourg 2002, ISBN 3-486-25887-7 (published under the pen-name Gustav Kempf).
- Im Wind des Wandels. Ostasiens neue Revolution. Bonn: Bouvier 1997, ISBN 3-416-02676-4.
- Japan, Haupt der Erde, Würzburg: Königshausen und Neumann 1982, ISBN 3-88479-097-8.

=== Articles and commentaries ===
2019 + With Hanns Günther Hilpert and Frédéric Krumbein: Chinas gelenkte Erinnerung. Wie historische Ereignisse erinnert, glorifiziert, umgedeutet und verschwiegen werden. In: SWP-Aktuell 2019/A 70, Dezember 2019

- Die Zukunft der Diplomatie, In: Ulrich Schlie (ed.), Modernes Regierungshandeln in Zeiten der GLobalisierung. Baden-Baden: Nomos, 2019, p. 129-140.
- Die Tragik Hongkongs und Schwierigkeiten der deutschen Chinapolitik. In: Kurz gesagt (SWP-Homepage), November 2019
- Krise in Hongkong. Die EU sollte China die Grenzen aufzeigen. In: Handelsblatt, 29.08.2019
- 30 Jahre Tiananmen: Erinnerungskultur als Politikum. In: Kurz gesagt (SWP-Homepage), Mai 2019

2018

- Diplomatie: Immer wieder neu auf »Los«! In: Hanns Günther Hilpert, Oliver Meier (Hg.) Facetten des Nordkorea-Konflikts. Beiträge zu Sammelstudien 2018/S 18, September 2018, p. 57-62
- Machtverschiebungen in Ostasien: Chinas Welt und Europas Platz darin. In: Philipp Wolf (Hg.), Die neue Weltunordnung: Krise, Chancen und die Rolle Europas, Leipzig: Leipziger Universitätsverlag, 2018, p. 73-88.
- Ein chinesischer Leviathan? in: Politikum, Heft 1, Frühjahr 2018, S. 62-64

2017

- Chinesische Softpower: Der Mythos der neuen Seidenstraße, in: IAP - Insight Asia-Pacific (online) 4/2017
- Wie umgehen mit der Weltmacht China? in: Frankfurter Allgemeine Zeitung, 01.11.2017, S.8
- Mächtiger als Mao: Xi und der 19. Parteitag der KP Chinas, in: Kurz gesagt (SWP-Homepage), Oktober 2017
- Machtverschiebungen in Ostasien. Chinas Welt und Europas Platz darin, in: Deutsche Gesellschaft für Natur- und Völkerkunde Ostasiens (OAG): OAG-Notizen (Tokyo), 06/2017, S. 9-20
- Nordkorea: Europa am Zug, in: Kurz gesagt (SWP-Homepage), September 2017
- Tibet - nur noch ein Randthema? Warum zivilgesellschaftliches Engagement der Politik den Rücken stärkt, in: Brennpunkt Tibet 3|2017, Tibet Initiative Deutschland e.V., Berlin 2017
- Der Mega-Marshallplan. Wie Chinas Mammut-Projekt „Neue Seidenstraße“ ein Erfolg werden könnte – und wie nicht, in: IPG Online, 17. 05. 2017
- Bringt Trump Bewegung in die Nordkorea-Frage? SWP Kurz gesagt, April 2017
- Trump Leaves China and European Allies Wondering. GMF Transatlantic Take, Feb 15, 2017
- Digitisation and Government Responsibility. Working Paper, Project “Diplomacy in the 21st Century”, No 03, January 2017 Also ETHZ Security Watch and ISPSW Analysis No. 482

2016

- Peace, Business and Classical Culture. The Relationship between the German Democratic Republic and Japan, in: Cho, Joanne Miyang, Lee, M. Roberts, Spang, Christian W. (eds.): Transnational Encounters between Germany and Japan: Perceptions of Partnership in the Nineteenth and Twentieth Centuries, Houndmills/New York: Palgrave, 2016, pp. 227–245. 2015
- Need Disputes Turn into Armed Conflicts? East Asia’s Maritime Conflicts in a New Environment: Consequences for the European Union, in: European Foreign Affairs Review, Volume 21 (2016), Issue 3/1, pp. 65–79
- Nach der US-Wahl: Unsicherheit in China, Schock in Japan. SWP Kurz gesagt, November 2016
- Diplomacy in the 21st Century. Working Paper, Project "Diplomacy in the 21st Century", No 01, October 2016
- Der japanische Tenno revoltiert: Er will abdanken, SWP-Kurz gesagt, August 2016
- The Law of the Sea, China, the EU and the Global Order, ECFR Commentary, July 2016
- G7: Meinungsbildung in der Wertegemeinschaft. SWP_Kurz gesagt, Mai 2016
- The EU-Turkey Deal and the St. Louis Refugee Crisis. In The Globalist, Mai 2016 Auch in Japan Times, 9. Mai 2016:
- The New Trilateral: Enhancing U.S.-Europe-Japan Cooperation to Reinforce the International Institutional Order. In ISPSW Strategy Series No. 415, April 2016
- Defending a Fraying Order, GMF Commentary, März 2016
- Staatsbesuch in China: Kritik in der Abseitsfalle. SWP-Kurz gesagt, März 2016
- Gauck in China: Germany and Human Rights. In The Globalist, März 2016
- The Self-Emasculation of Mainstream Politics. ECFR Commentary, März 2016: commentary the self emasculation of mainstream politics
- Danger on the High Seas. An East Asian Security Challenge. ECFR Publication, Januar 2016 Auch ISPSW Strategy Series nr. 403, February 2016. Updated version in German in OAG-Notizen 1702, Tokyo, February 2017: OAG-Notizen 1702, February 2017
- The Historic China-Taiwan Meeting Will Not Serve Xi. ECFR Blog, November 2016

2015

- A War of Character. ECFR Commentary, November 2015
- Walking on Eggshells: Japan Confronts Its World War II Legacy, Transatlantic Take, German Marshall Fund, 2. September 2015,
- China ist nicht so durchformiert, wie es scheint, in: Süddeutsche Zeitung, 17. August 2015
- Iran und die Bombe, in: Frankfurter Allgemeine Zeitung, 30. Juni 2015. Die europäische Nachsicht mit China, in: Frankfurter Rundschau, 8. Juni 2015.
- Der wahre chinesische Traum. Weshalb China auf eine globale statt auf eine sinozentrische Zukunft setzen könnte, in: IPG Journal, 17. Mai 2015 Auch als ISPSW Strategy Series No. 348, Mai 2016
- Seventy Years After World War II: German and Japanese Successes and Responsibilities, Policy Brief, German Marshall Fund, 16. April 2015
- Trust But Verify: How Sanctions Produced an Iran Nuclear Deal, Transatlantic Take, German Marshall Fund, 8. April 2015
- China Divides the West, Transatlantic Take, German Marshall Fund, 30. März 2015
- Germany and Japan: A Comeback Story, in: The Globalist, 7. März 2015
- Zwei Staaten – eine Lektion, in: Süddeutsche Zeitung, 5. März 2015.
- The New Minsk Ceasefire: Avoiding Putin’s trap, Commentary, European Council on Foreign Relations, 12. Februar 2015.
- When America Simply Shrugs, in: The Globalist, 9. Januar 2015 in: Commentary, European Council on Forgn Relations, 12. Januar 2015.
- The Global American Dream, in: The Globalist, 10. Januar 2015

2014

- Die Beziehungen zwischen Deutschland und Japan. In: Raimund Wördemann und Karin Yamaguchi (Hg.), Länderbericht Japan. Die Erbteilung der Zukunft. Bonn 2014: <<<bundeszentrale für Politische Bildung, S. 184-200.
- Shinzo Abe’s new Lease on Life, Commentary, European Council on Foreign Relations, 14. Dezember 2014.
- Der chinesische Traum, in: Süddeutsche Zeitung, 21. Oktober 2014.
- Rising Tensions in East Asia? A Transatlantic Perspective, MERICS China Comment, Mercator Institute for China Studies, 17. November 2014
- Trade as a Confidence-Building Measure in East Asia, Global HotSpots, in: The Globalist, 17. November 2014, How Hong Kong's protests weaken Xi * * Jinping's strongman image, Blog-Eintrag, European Council on Foreign Relations, 310.2014.
- No time for cynics: the German-American intelligence dispute, Commentary, European Council on Foreign Relations, 15. Juni 2014.
- Die Kommunistische Partei und ihr historischer Erfolg: Chinas prekärer Gesellschaftsvertrag, Merics China Comment, Mercator Institute for China Studies, 4. Juni 2014.
- The Ukraine Crisis and the West’s True Problem, European Council for Foreign Relations blog, 29. Mai 2014.
- Auf- und Untergang der Sonne, in: Frankfurter Allgemeine Zeitung, 7. April 2014. Japanische Übersetzung: 年4月7日付フランクフルターアルゲマイネ紙「陽は上り、陽は沈む」元駐日本大使寄稿; Chinesische Übersetzung: 東亞的日出日落
- China und die Krise in der Ukraine: Warum Peking trotz Bedenken weiterhin mit Moskau kooperieren wird, MERICS China Comment, Mercator Institute for China Studies, 28. März 2014.
- Vorwort zu: Ivanova, Galina Dmitrievna. Mori Ogai. OAG-Taschenbuch Nr. 99. Tokyo: Judicium (Deutsche Gesellschaft für Natur- und Völkerkunde Ostasiens), 2014.
- Buchbesprechung: 'Christian W. Spang' Karl Haushofer und Japan Die Rezeption seiner geopolitischen Theorien in der deutschen und japanischen Politik, OAG Notizen, Februar 2014.

2013 und earlier

- The NSA and the Transatlantic Relationship, European Council for Foreign Relations blog, 22. Dezember 2013.
- Die Bühne ist bereit für einen Konflikt: China, Japan, und die USA, MERICS China Comment, Mercator Institute for China Studies, 9. Dezember 2013.
- Japan, dreifach getroffen, in: Albrecht Rothacher (ed.), Japan an jenem Tag. Augenzeugenberichte zum 11. März 2011, OAG-Taschenbuch Nr. 97., Tokyo: OAG Deutsche Gesellschaft für Natur- und Völkerkunde Ostasiens 2013. 2001–2011
- Die Weltmacht nebenan. In: OAG-Notizen 06/2011. Tokyo: OAG – Deutsche Gesellschaft für Natur- und Völkerkunde Ostasiens (Tokyo), S. 24–33.
- Asien in einer multipolaren Welt? In: OAG-Notizen 09/2010. Tokyo: OAG – Deutsche Gesellschaft für Natur- und Völkerkunde Ostasiens (Tokyo), S. 21–24.
- The Future of the International Community and the Role of Medium-Sized Powers in 2010, in: Asia Jiho, 6. Juli 2010 (Japanisch).
- Gestaltungspartner Japan, in: Insight 1, German-Asia Pacific Business Association, 2010.
- An Exit Strategy for Afghanistan, in: Petersberg Papers on Afghanistan and the Region, from the Liechtenstein Colloquium Report IV, 2009.
- The E.U. and China in the Global System, in: China-Europe Relations: Perceptions, Policies and Prospects, edited by David Shambaugh, Eberhard Sandschneider and Zhou Hong, 2008.
- Reflections on Asia in the 21st Century, in: ASIEN 100 (2006), S. 79–84.
- Überlegungen zur deutschen Chinapolitik, in: China-Report, Nr. 42/ März 2005.
- Deutschlands Verteidigung am Hindukusch. Das Experiment Afghanistan, in: Unterwegs in die Zukunft. edited by Günther Gomm-Ernsting, (Berlin: Berliner Wissenschafts-Verlag, 2005), S. 27–38.
- Mudai, in: Daiwa n. 41, Kyoto (2005), (in Japanese).
- Aufstieg zur Weltmacht, in: Volker Ullrich, Eva Berie (ed.), Der Fischer Weltalmanach, Frankfurt am Main, 2005.
- Asia's Role in the World: A View from Europe, in: Xuequ Gu (ed.), Europe and Asia: Mutual Perceptions and Expectations on the Way to a New Partnership in the Twenty-First Century, Baden Baden: Nomos Verlagsgesellschaft, 2002.
- Remembering and Forgetting. But Will the Past Forget about Us?, in: Memory and History in East and Southeast Asia, Center for Strategic and International Studies 23, no. 3 (2001): S. 3–15. 1981–2000
- Dealing with the Backwoods: New Challenges for the Transatlantic Relationship, The Washington Quarterly 22, no. 2 (June 1999): S. 17–23.
- Das Potential nutzen: Der Westen braucht eine Asienpolitik, Die Zeit, 12. Mai 1999.
- Botschafter, auf nach Des Moines, Die Welt, 1. Januar 1999.
- Jenseits des europäischen Traums. Japan mustert das Abendland. In: Nilmar Hoffmann und Dieter Kramer (Hg.), Europa - Kontinent im Abseits?Hamburg 1998: Rowohlt, S. 160-170.
- Wandel ohne Werte, Werte ohne Wandel? China im Rausch der Moderne, Deutsch-Chinesische Gesellschaft e.V., Bonn, 1998, S. 23–40; ISBN 3-9806665-0-6.
- A World of Warring States: China's Perception and Possibilities of Its International Role, Paper presented at 'China's International Role: Key Issues, Common Interests, Different Approaches' International Conference in Brühl, 1997.
- Die amerikanisch-japanische Sicherheitsdeklaration: Allianz für das 21. Jahrhundert, Japan Magazin 4, 1996.
- Murayama: neuer Premier und alte Probleme, Japan Magazin 1, 1996.
- The Reshaping of Socialism in China, Aussenpolitik IV, 1994, S. 364-373.
- Mishima und seine Schildgemeinschaft, in: Gisela Völger, Karin v.Welck (Hg.), Männer Bande, Männer Bünde: Zur Rolle des Mannes im Kulturvergleich, Köln: Ausstellung des Josef-Hambrich-Kunsthalle, 1990.
- Peripetien frühen japanischen Humors, in: Klaus Antoni, Geza Dombrady (Hg.), G.S.D. zur Feier, Hamburg: Oriens Extremus, 1989.
- Marxismus in Arabien. Der Südjemen nach zwanzig Jahren Unabhängigkeit, Außenpolitik 39, n. 3 (1988). (Auch Englisch: Marxism in Arabia. South Yemen Twenty Years After Independence. German Foreign Affairs Review Vol 39, 3/88, S: 265-277.
- Die "Utopie des Menschen mit lüsternem Herzen". Einige Aspekte eines umstrittenen "Nationalschatzes" der modernen erotischen Literatur Japans. In: G.S. Dombrandy und Franziska Ehmcke (Hg.), Referate des VI. Deutschen Japanologentages in Köln. Hamburg 1985: MOAG Band 100, S. 296-310.
- Traditional Ultra-Nationalist Conceptions in Mishima Yukios Manifesto, in: I.G. O'Neill (ed.), Tradition and Modern Japan, Kent: Paul Norbury Publications Limited, 1981.
