= Peers Carter =

British diplomat (1916–2001)

Peers Lee Carter (5 December 1916 – 8 February 2001) was a British diplomat. He was Ambassador to Afghanistan from 1968 to 1972. His role helping to organise the British evacuation of Holland when the Germans invaded in May 1940 is told in the book 'Escape From Holland' by Chris Hunt.
