= Heads of diplomatic missions of the United Kingdom =

Flag used by British embassies

The Union Flag, used by high commissions

Flag used by British consulates and consulates-general

The heads of British diplomatic missions are persons appointed as senior diplomats to individual nations, or international organizations. They are usually appointed as ambassadors, except in member countries of the Commonwealth of Nations where a high commissioner is appointed. The head of mission to an international organization is usually a permanent representative. For some nations a consul or consul-general is appointed.

The positions have a dual role, being representatives of the British monarchy and the British government; they are recommended by the Foreign, Commonwealth and Development Office, and then approved by Buckingham Palace.

== Resident heads of mission ==
Mission	Location	Type	Head of mission	Position	List
Albania	Tirana	Embassy	Nick Abbott	Ambassador	List
Algeria	Algiers	Embassy	James Downer	Ambassador	List
Angola	Luanda	Embassy	Bharat Joshi	Ambassador	List
Argentina	Buenos Aires	Embassy	David Cairns	Ambassador	List
Armenia	Yerevan	Embassy	Alexandra Cole	Ambassador	List
Australia	Canberra	High Commission	Dame Sarah MacIntosh	High Commissioner	List
Austria	Vienna	Embassy	Lindsay Skoll	Ambassador	List
Azerbaijan	Baku	Embassy	Duncan Norman	Ambassador	List
Bahamas	Nassau	High Commission	Smita Rossetti	High Commissioner	List
Bahrain	Manama	Embassy	Alastair Long	Ambassador	List
Bangladesh	Dhaka	High Commission	Sarah Cooke	High Commissioner	List
Barbados	Bridgetown	High Commission	Simon Mustard	High Commissioner	List
Belarus	Minsk	Embassy	David Ward	Chargé d'Affaires	List
Belgium	Brussels	Embassy	Anne Sherriff	Ambassador	List
Belize	Belmopan	High Commission	Alistair White	High Commissioner	List
Bolivia	La Paz	Embassy	Richard Porter	Ambassador	List
Bosnia and Herzegovina	Sarajevo	Embassy	Julian Reilly	Ambassador	List
Botswana	Gaborone	High Commission	Giles Enticknap	High Commissioner	List
Brazil	Brasília	Embassy	Stephanie Al-Qaq	Ambassador	List
Brunei	Bandar Seri Begawan	High Commission	Alexandra McKenzie	High Commissioner	List
Bulgaria	Sofia	Embassy	Nathaniel Copsey	Ambassador	List
Cambodia	Phnom Penh	Embassy	Dominic Williams	Ambassador	List
Cameroon	Yaoundé	High Commission	Matt Woods	High Commissioner	List
Canada	Ottawa	High Commission	Rob Tinline	High Commissioner	List
Chad	N'Djamena	Embassy Office^{[note b]}	Helena Owen	Ambassador	
Chile	Santiago	Embassy	David Concar	Ambassador	List
China	Beijing	Embassy	Peter Wilson	Ambassador	List
Colombia	Bogotá	Embassy	George Hodgson	Ambassador	List
Democratic Republic of the Congo	Kinshasa	Embassy	Alyson King	Ambassador	List
Costa Rica	San José	Embassy	Ben Lyster-Binns	Ambassador	List
Croatia	Zagreb	Embassy	Javed Patel	Ambassador	List
Cuba	Havana	Embassy	James Hooley	Ambassador	List
Cyprus	Nicosia	High Commission	Michael Tatham	High Commissioner	List
Czech Republic	Prague	Embassy	Matt Field	Ambassador	List
Denmark	Copenhagen	Embassy	Victoria Billing OBE	Ambassador	List
Djibouti	Djibouti City	Embassy	Vinay Talwar	Ambassador	
Dominican Republic	Santo Domingo	Embassy	Carol van der Walt	Ambassador	List
Ecuador	Quito	Embassy	Libby Green	Ambassador	List
Egypt	Cairo	Embassy	Mark Bryson-Richardson	Ambassador	List
El Salvador	San Salvador	Embassy	Nick Whittingham	Chargé d'Affaires	List
Eritrea	Asmara	Embassy	David McIlroy	Ambassador	List
Estonia	Tallinn	Embassy	Ross Allen	Ambassador	List
Eswatini	Mbabane	High Commission	Colin Wells	High Commissioner	
Ethiopia	Addis Ababa	Embassy	Darren Welch	Ambassador	List
Fiji	Suva	High Commission	Kanbar Hossein-Bor	High Commissioner	List
Finland	Helsinki	Embassy	Laura Davies	Ambassador	List
France	Paris	Embassy	Sir Thomas Drew	Ambassador	List
Gabon	Libreville	High Commission	Simon Day	High Commissioner	List
The Gambia	Banjul	High Commission	Harriet King	High Commissioner	List
Georgia	Tbilisi	Embassy	Gareth Ward	Ambassador	List
Germany	Berlin	Embassy	Andrew Mitchell	Ambassador	List
Ghana	Accra	High Commission	Christian Rogg	High Commissioner	List
Greece	Athens	Embassy	Matthew Lodge	Ambassador	List
Guatemala	Guatemala City	Embassy	Juliana Correa	Ambassador	List
Guinea	Conakry	Embassy	Daniel Shepherd	Ambassador	List
Guyana	Georgetown	High Commission	Joseph Fisher	High Commissioner	List
Haiti	Port-au-Prince	Embassy	Guy Janes	Deputy Head of Mission	List
Holy See	Vatican City	Embassy	Christopher Trott	Ambassador	List
Hungary	Budapest	Embassy	Justin McKenzie Smith	Ambassador	List
Iceland	Reykjavík	Embassy	Jane Stevens	Ambassador	List
India	New Delhi	High Commission	Lindy Cameron	High Commissioner	List
Indonesia	Jakarta	Embassy	Dominic Jermey	Ambassador	List
Iran	Tehran	Embassy	Hugo Shorter	Ambassador	List
Iraq	Baghdad	Embassy	Irfan Siddiq	Ambassador	List
Ireland	Dublin	Embassy	Kara Owen	Ambassador	List
Israel	Tel Aviv	Embassy	Simon Walters	Ambassador	List
Italy	Rome	Embassy	Stephen Hickey	Ambassador	List
Ivory Coast	Abidjan	Embassy	John Marshall	Ambassador	List
Jamaica	Kingston	High Commission	Alicia Herbert OBE	High Commissioner	List
Japan	Tokyo	Embassy	Julia Longbottom	Ambassador	List
Jordan	Amman	Embassy	Philip Hall	Ambassador	List
Kazakhstan	Almaty	Embassy	Sally Axworthy	Ambassador	List
Kenya	Nairobi	High Commission	Matt Baugh	High Commissioner	List
Kosovo	Pristina	Embassy	Jonathan Hargreaves	Ambassador	List
Kuwait	Kuwait City	Embassy	Qudsi Rasheed	Ambassador	List
Kyrgyzstan	Bishkek	Embassy	Nicholas Bowler	Ambassador	List
Laos	Vientiane	Embassy	Mel Barlow	Ambassador	List
Latvia	Riga	Embassy	Kathy Leach	Ambassador	List
Lebanon	Beirut	Embassy	Hamish Cowell	Ambassador	List
Lesotho	Maseru	High Commission	Martine Sobey	High Commissioner	List
Liberia	Monrovia	Embassy	Paul Simister	Ambassador	List
Libya	Tripoli	Embassy	Martin Longden	Ambassador	List
Lithuania	Vilnius	Embassy	Liz Boyles	Ambassador	List
Luxembourg	Luxembourg	Embassy	Joanne Olivier	Ambassador	List
Madagascar	Antananarivo	Embassy	Patrick Lynch	Ambassador	List
Malawi	Lilongwe	High Commission	Leigh Stubblefield	High Commissioner	List
Malaysia	Kuala Lumpur	High Commission	Ajay Sharma	High Commissioner	List
Mali	Bamako	Embassy	Angus McKee	Ambassador	List
Malta	Valletta	High Commission	Victoria Busby	High Commissioner	List
Mauritania	Nouakchott	Embassy	Guy Harrison	Ambassador	List
Mauritius	Port Louis	High Commission	Paul Brummell	High Commissioner	List
Mexico	Mexico City	Embassy	Susannah Goshko	Ambassador	List
Moldova	Chişinău	Embassy	Fern Horine	Ambassador	List
Mongolia	Ulaanbaatar	Embassy	Fiona Blyth	Ambassador	List
Montenegro	Podgorica	Embassy	Dawn McKen	Ambassador	List
Morocco	Rabat	Embassy	Simon Martin	Ambassador	List
Mozambique	Maputo	High Commission	Helen Lewis	High Commissioner	List
Myanmar	Yangon	Embassy	Andrew Jackson	Ambassador	List
Namibia	Windhoek	High Commission	Neil Bradley	High Commissioner	List
Nepal	Kathmandu	Embassy	Robert Fenn	Ambassador	List
Netherlands	The Hague	Embassy	Chris Rampling	Ambassador	List
New Zealand	Wellington	High Commission	Louise Cantillon	High Commissioner	List
Niger	Niamey	Embassy^{[note c]}	Catherine Inglehearn	Ambassador	
Nigeria	Abuja	High Commission	Richard Montgomery	High Commissioner	List
North Korea	Pyongyang	Embassy	Simon Wood	Ambassador	List
North Macedonia	Skopje	Embassy	Matthew Lawson	Ambassador	List
Norway	Oslo	Embassy	Jan Thompson	Ambassador	List
Oman	Muscat	Embassy	Dr Liane Saunders	Ambassador	List
Pakistan	Islamabad	High Commission	Jane Marriott	High Commissioner	List
Panama	Panama City	Embassy	Greg Houston	Ambassador	List
Papua New Guinea	Port Moresby	High Commission	Keith Scott	High Commissioner	List
Paraguay	Asunción	Embassy	Danielle Dunne	Ambassador	List
Peru	Lima	Embassy	Su-Lin Garbett-Shiels	Ambassador	List
Philippines	Manila	Embassy	Sarah Hulton	Ambassador	List
Poland	Warsaw	Embassy	Dame Melinda Simmons	Ambassador	List
Portugal	Lisbon	Embassy	Lisa Bandari	Ambassador	List
Qatar	Doha	Embassy	Neerav Patel	Ambassador	List
Romania	Bucharest	Embassy	Giles Portman	Ambassador	List
Russia	Moscow	Embassy	Nigel Casey	Ambassador	List
Rwanda	Kigali	High Commission	Alison Thorpe	High Commissioner	List
Samoa	Apia	High Commission	Andrew Nethercott	High Commissioner	List
Saudi Arabia	Riyadh	Embassy	Stephen Hitchen	Ambassador	List
Senegal	Dakar	Embassy	Carine Robarts	Ambassador	List
Serbia	Belgrade	Embassy	Edward Ferguson	Ambassador	List
Seychelles	Victoria	High Commission	Jeff Glekin	High Commissioner	List
Sierra Leone	Freetown	High Commission	Josephine Gauld	High Commissioner	List
Singapore	Singapore	High Commission	Nikesh Mehta	High Commissioner	List
Slovakia	Bratislava	Embassy	Bilal Zahid	Ambassador	List
Slovenia	Ljubljana	Embassy	Victoria Harrison	Ambassador	List
Solomon Islands	Honiara	High Commission	Paul Turner	High Commissioner	List
Somalia	Mogadishu	Embassy	Charles King	Ambassador	List
South Africa	Pretoria	High Commission	Antony Phillipson	High Commissioner	List
South Korea	Seoul	Embassy	Colin Crooks	Ambassador	List
South Sudan	Juba	Embassy	David Ashley	Ambassador	List
Spain	Madrid	Embassy	Sir Alex Ellis	Ambassador	List
Sri Lanka	Colombo	High Commission	Andrew Patrick	High Commissioner	List
Sweden	Stockholm	Embassy	Samantha Job	Ambassador	List
Switzerland	Bern	Embassy	Olivia Ricketts	Ambassador	List
Taiwan	Taipei	Office	Ruth Bradley-Jones	Representative	List
Tajikistan	Dushanbe	Embassy	Katherine Smitton	Ambassador	List
Tanzania	Dar es Salaam	High Commission	Marianne Young	High Commissioner	List
Thailand	Bangkok	Embassy	Mark Gooding	Ambassador	List
Tonga	Nukuʻalofa	High Commissioner	Keith McMahon	High Commissioner	List
Trinidad and Tobago	Port of Spain	High Commission	Jon Dean	High Commissioner	List
Tunisia	Tunis	Embassy	Roderick Drummond	Ambassador	List
Turkey	Ankara	Embassy	Jennifer Anderson	Ambassador	List
Turkmenistan	Ashgabat	Embassy	Stephen Conlon	Ambassador	List
Uganda	Kampala	High Commission	Lisa Chesney	High Commissioner	List
Ukraine	Kyiv	Embassy	Neil Crompton	Ambassador	List
United Arab Emirates	Abu Dhabi	Embassy	Edward Hobart	Ambassador	List
United States	Washington, D.C.	Embassy	Sir Christian Turner	Ambassador	List
Uruguay	Montevideo	Embassy	Mal Green	Ambassador	List
Uzbekistan	Tashkent	Embassy	Timothy Smart	Ambassador	List
Vanuatu	Port Vila	High Commission	Nicolette Brent	High Commissioner	List
Venezuela	Caracas	Embassy	Colin Dick	Ambassador	List
Vietnam	Hanoi	Embassy	Iain Frew	Ambassador	List
Yemen	Sanaa	Embassy	Abda Sharif	Ambassador	List
Zambia	Lusaka	High Commission	Rebecca Terzeon	High Commissioner	List
Zimbabwe	Harare	Embassy	Gill Lever	Ambassador	List

^{[note a]} No diplomatic relations with Taiwan; office functions as a mission.

^{[note b]} In 2021 the UK government established a resident Ambassador in Chad based in the EU delegation office in N'Djamena

^{[note b]} In 2020 the UK government established a resident Ambassador in Niger based in the French Embassy compound in Niamey

== Non-resident heads of mission ==
The United Kingdom does not maintain a full embassy or High Commission in a number of countries. In each of these cases the head of mission to another country, usually a neighbouring one, is also accredited to the other country (except, at present, for the ambassadors to Haiti and Honduras, who are dedicated but non-resident). In most cases a smaller, local mission provides for emergencies, and is headed by a lesser diplomat or a member of the local British community.

In April 2018 the Foreign Secretary announced the opening of nine new diplomatic posts across the Commonwealth. As a result, some countries which currently have non-resident High Commissioners are to receive resident High Commissioners. The expected dates of residence are noted below for those countries where an appointment has been announced.

Mission	Resident Country	Local Location	Local Mission	Non-Resident Head of mission	Local Position	List
Afghanistan	Qatar	None	N/A	Robert Dickson	Chargé d'Affaires ad Interim	List
Andorra	Spain	None	N/A	Sir Alex Ellis	Ambassador	
Antigua and Barbuda	Barbados	St John's	Honorary Consul	Simon Mustard	High Commissioner	
Benin	Ghana	None	N/A	Christian Rogg	Ambassador	
Burkina Faso	Ghana	Ouagadougou	Honorary Consul	Christian Rogg	Ambassador	
Burundi	Rwanda	Bujumbura	Liaison Office	Omar Daair	Ambassador	
Cape Verde	Senegal	São Vicente	Consul	Carine Robarts	Ambassador	
Central African Republic	Democratic Republic of the Congo	None	N/A	Alyson King	Ambassador	
Comoros	Madagascar	Moroni	N/A	Patrick Lynch	Ambassador	
Republic of the Congo	Democratic Republic of the Congo	Brazzaville	Honorary Consul	Alyson King	Ambassador	
Dominica	Barbados	Roseau	Honorary Consul	Simon Mustard	High Commissioner	
East Timor	Indonesia	Jakarta	Honorary Consul	Dominic Jermey	Ambassador	
Equatorial Guinea	Cameroon	Malabo	Honorary Consul	Matt Woods	Ambassador	
Grenada	Barbados	St George's	Honorary Consul	Simon Mustard	High Commissioner	
Guinea-Bissau	Senegal	Bissau	Honorary Consul	Carine Robarts	Ambassador	
Haiti	Dominican Republic	Port-au-Prince	Consul	Guy Jaynes	Deputy Head of Mission	List
Honduras	Guatemala	Tegucigalpa	Honorary Consul	Juliana Correa	Ambassador	List
Kiribati	Fiji	None	N/A	Kanbar Hossein-Bor	High Commissioner	
Liechtenstein	Switzerland	None	N/A	Olivia Ricketts	Ambassador	
Maldives	Sri Lanka	Malé	Honorary Consul	Andrew Patrick	High Commissioner	
Marshall Islands	Fiji	None	N/A	Kanbar Hossein-Bor	Ambassador	
Federated States of Micronesia	Fiji	None	N/A	Kanbar Hossein-Bor	Ambassador	
Monaco	France	Monaco	Honorary Consulate	Sir Thomas Drew	Ambassador	
Nauru	Solomon Islands	None	N/A	Paul Turner	High Commissioner	
Nicaragua	Costa Rica	Managua	Embassy	Ben Lyster-Binns	Ambassador	List
Palau	Philippines	None	N/A	Laure Beaufils	Ambassador	
Saint Kitts and Nevis	Barbados	Basseterre	Honorary Consul	Simon Mustard	High Commissioner	
Saint Lucia	Barbados	Castries	High Commission	Simon Mustard	High Commissioner	
Saint Vincent and the Grenadines	Barbados	Kingstown	Honorary Consul	Simon Mustard	High Commissioner	
San Marino	Italy	Rome	Consulate-General	Stephen Hickey	Ambassador	
São Tomé and Príncipe	Angola	São Tomé	Consulate	Bharat Joshi	Ambassador	
Sudan	Ethiopia	None	N/A	Giles Lever	Ambassador	
Suriname	Guyana	Paramaribo	Consulate	Joseph Fisher	Ambassador	
Togo	Ivory Coast	None	N/A	John Marshall	Ambassador	
Tuvalu	Fiji	None	N/A	Kanbar Hossein-Bor	High Commissioner	

== Heads of mission to non-sovereign territories ==
Mission	Location	Type	Head of mission	Position	List	Notes
Hong Kong	Hong Kong	Consulate-General	Brian Davidson	Consul-General	List	Functions held by the Foreign and Commonwealth Office (before 1968 Colonial Office), British Council and British Trade Commission prior to 1997
Jerusalem	East Jerusalem	Consulate-General	Helen Winterton	Consul-General	List	Mission to the occupied Palestinian territories
Macau	Macau	Honorary Consulate	Glenn McCartney	Honorary Consul		Full consular services for Macau are provided via the Consulate in Hong Kong and the Consul-General to Hong Kong is the official diplomat for Macau

== Heads of mission to international organisations ==
Mission	Location	Head of mission	Position	List
African Union	Addis Ababa	Darren Welch	Ambassador to Ethiopia also accredited as Permanent Representative	List
Association of Southeast Asian Nations	Jakarta	Helen Fazey	Ambassador	List
Conference on Disarmament	Geneva	David Riley	Permanent Representative	List
Council of Europe	Strasbourg	Sandy Moss	Permanent Representative	List
European Union	Brussels	Caroline Wilson	Ambassador	List
North Atlantic Treaty Organization	Brussels	Angus Lapsley	Permanent Representative	List
Organisation for Economic Co-operation and Development	Paris	Andrew Wood	Permanent Representative	List
Organisation for the Prohibition of Chemical Weapons	The Hague	Chris Rampling	Ambassador to the Netherlands also accredited as Permanent Representative	List
Organization for Security and Co-operation in Europe	Vienna	Neil Holland	Head of Delegation	List
United Nations in Geneva	Geneva	Kumar Iyer	Permanent Representative	List
World Trade Organization	Geneva	Kumar Iyer	Permanent Representative	List
International Organization for Migration	Geneva	Kumar Iyer	Permanent Representative	List
International Committee of the Red Cross	Geneva	Kumar Iyer	Permanent Representative	List
International Labour Organization	Geneva	Kumar Iyer	Permanent Representative	List
United Nations in New York	New York City	James Kariuki	Permanent Representative	List
United Nations agencies in Rome	Rome	Evelyn Ashton-Griffiths	Ambassador and Permanent Representative to the United Nations agencies in Rome	
United Nations in Vienna	Vienna	Lindsay Skoll	Ambassador to Austria also accredited as Permanent Representative	List

== See also ==
- List of ambassadors and high commissioners to the United Kingdom
