= Lists of ambassadors of the United Kingdom =

The list below includes lists of ambassadors and high commissioners of the United Kingdom (who fulfil the function of ambassadors in fellow countries of the Commonwealth of Nations).

This article includes, in separate sections, ambassadors of the former Kingdom of Great Britain (1707–1801) and Kingdom of England (10th century–1707).

== Ambassadors and high commissioners of the United Kingdom ==
- Afghanistan
- Albania
- Algeria
- Angola
- Argentina
- Armenia
- Australia
- Austria
- Azerbaijan
- Bahamas
- Bahrain
- Bangladesh
- Barbados
- Belarus
- Belgium
- Belize
- Bolivia
- Bosnia-Herzegovina
- Botswana
- Brazil
- Brunei
- Bulgaria
- Burma
- Cambodia
- Cameroon
- Canada
- Chile
- China
- Colombia
- DR Congo
- Costa Rica
- Côte d'Ivoire
- Croatia
- Cuba
- Cyprus
- Czech Republic
- Denmark
- Dominican Republic
- Ecuador
- Egypt
- El Salvador
- Eritrea
- Estonia
- Ethiopia
- Fiji
- Finland
- France
- The Gambia
- Georgia
- Germany
- Ghana
- Greece
- Guatemala
- Guinea
- Guyana
- Haiti
- Holy See
- Honduras
- Hungary
- Iceland
- India
- Indonesia
- Iran
- Iraq
- Ireland
- Israel
- Italy
- Jamaica
- Japan
- Jordan
- Kazakhstan
- Kenya
- Korea, DPR (North Korea)
- Korea, RO (South Korea)
- Kosovo
- Kuwait
- Kyrgyzstan
- Laos
- Latvia
- Lebanon
- Liberia
- Libya
- Lithuania
- Luxembourg
- Macedonia
- Madagascar
- Malawi
- Malaysia
- Mali
- Malta
- Mauritius
- Mexico
- Moldova
- Mongolia
- Montenegro
- Morocco
- Mozambique
- Namibia
- Nepal
- Netherlands
- New Zealand
- Nicaragua
- Nigeria
- Norway
- Oman
- Pakistan
- Panama
- Papua New Guinea
- Paraguay
- Peru
- Philippines
- Poland
- Portugal
- Qatar
- Romania
- Russia
- Rwanda
- Saudi Arabia
- Senegal
- Serbia
- Seychelles
- Sierra Leone
- Singapore
- Slovakia
- Slovenia
- Solomon Islands
- Somalia
- South Africa
- South Sudan
- Spain
- Sri Lanka
- Sudan
- Sweden
- Switzerland
- Syria
- Tajikistan
- Tanzania
- Thailand
- Tonga
- Trinidad and Tobago
- Tunisia
- Turkey
- Turkmenistan
- Uganda
- Ukraine
- United Arab Emirates
- United States
- Uruguay
- Uzbekistan
- Venezuela
- Vietnam
- Yemen
- Zambia
- Zimbabwe

== Ambassadors of Great Britain ==
- List of ambassadors of Great Britain to Denmark
- List of ambassadors of Great Britain to France
- List of ambassadors of Great Britain to the Holy Roman Emperor
- List of ambassadors of Great Britain to Portugal
- List of ambassadors of Great Britain to Russia
- List of ambassadors of Great Britain to Sweden

== Ambassadors of the Kingdom of England ==
- List of ambassadors of the Kingdom of England to Denmark
- List of ambassadors of the Kingdom of England to France
- List of ambassadors of the Kingdom of England to Portugal
- List of ambassadors of the Kingdom of England to Russia
- List of ambassadors of the Kingdom of England to Sweden

== See also ==
- List of heads of missions of the United Kingdom
