= Richard Dorman (diplomat) =

British diplomat (1925–2022)

High Commissioner of the United Kingdom to Vanuatu
- In office 1982–1985
- Preceded by: William Ashford
- Succeeded by: Malcolm Creek

Personal details
- Born: 8 August 1925; Stafford, England
- Died: 9 January 2022 (aged 96)

Richard Bostock Dorman CBE (8 August 1925 – 9 January 2022) was a British diplomat who served as the second High Commissioner of the United Kingdom to Vanuatu from 1982 until 1985.

== Life and career ==
Dorman was born in Stafford, Staffordshire on 8 August 1925. and was educated at Sedbergh School.

He served as the second High Commissioner of the United Kingdom to Vanuatu from 1982 until 1985, and also co-founded the British Friends of Vanuatu, (BFoV) in 1986, serving as the organisation's chairman until 1999.

Dorman was honoured with a CBE in 1984, and was awarded the Republic of Vanuatu National Award of Merit by Prime Minister Donald Kalpokas in November 1999. The awards ceremony was held at the Foreign, Commonwealth and Development Office in London.

In 2021, Dorman donated his collection of books related to Vanuatu and the New Herbides to the National Library of Vanuatu. His final shipment of books was scheduled to arrive in Port Vila on 17 January 2022, just days after his death.

Dorman died on 9 January 2022, at the age of 96. His death was announced by Gordon Dickinson, the chairman of the British Friends of Vanuatu.
