= Jacqueline Perkins =

Jacqueline Perkins may refer to:

- Jacqueline Perkins (runner)
- Jacqueline Perkins (diplomat)
