= Alexandra Hall Hall =

British diplomat

Alexandra Mary Hall Hall (born 1 February 1964) is a former British diplomat.

Hall Hall studied at Durham University, where she read Economics and Politics, graduating with a 2:1 degree in 1986. She is married to Daniel Twining, head of the International Republican Institute.

Hall Hall was British ambassador to Georgia from 2013 to 2016. Prior to her posting in Tbilisi, Hall Hall served in Bogotá, New Delhi, and the United States, amongst other places. She served as Brexit Counsellor at the British Embassy, Washington, from 2018 to December 2019.

Lead envoy for Brexit in the British Embassy in Washington, she resigned in December 2019, saying she was dismayed at Brexit "half-truths" and the "not totally honest" messages delivered to citizens.

Diplomatic posts
Preceded by Judith Gough	British Ambassador to Georgia; 2013–2016	Succeeded by Justin McKenzie Smith
