= Peter Wallis (diplomat) =

British diplomat and civil servant

Sir Peter Gordon Wallis, KCVO, CMG (born 1935) is a retired British diplomat and civil servant. He was the British High Commissioner to Malta between 1991 and 1994. Educated at Pembroke College, Oxford, Wallis joined the Civil Service in 1958 and worked in the Ministry of Labour and National Service and HM Customs and Excise, before joining HM Diplomatic Service in 1968. He went on to serve as Minister at the British Embassy in South Africa (1987–88), and Minister (1989) and then acting High Commissioner (1990) to Namibia; he was briefly political adviser to the Joint Commander of the British Forces in the Gulf in 1991 and to the Commander of the British Forces in South East Turkey and North Iraq later in that year. He was appointed a Companion of the Order of St Michael and St George in the 1990 Birthday Honours, and a Knight Commander of the Royal Victorian Order in 1992.
