= Hugh Philpott =

British Ambassador to Turkmenistan

His Excellency Hugh Stanley Philpott

British Ambassador to Turkmenistan
- In office September 2019 – October 2021
- Monarch: Elizabeth II
- Prime Minister: Boris Johnson
- Preceded by: Thorhilda Abbott-Watt
- Succeeded by: Lucia Wilde

Personal details
- Education: Open University
- Occupation: Diplomat

Hugh Stanley Philpott OBE (born 24 January 1961) is a British retired diplomat who served as Ambassador to Turkmenistan.

== Education ==
He was educated at Brockenhurst College and the Open University.

== Career ==
Hugh Stanley Philpott began his career at the Foreign and Commonwealth Office in 1980, where he dealt with a wide range of issues, including international security, foreign countries and the Middle East. He previously served in cities such as Oslo, Budapest, Baghdad, Washington and Muscat. He also worked at the UK Department for International Development, responsible for technical support to Russia, as well as the UK Department of Enterprise, Innovation and Crafts, where he led the British science and innovation network.

Since 2015, as ambassador, he headed the British diplomatic mission in Dushanbe, Tajikistan.

In November 2018, he was appointed British Ambassador to Turkmenistan. September 26, 2019 presented credentials in Turkmenistan. He served as Ambassador to Turkmenistan until October 2021.

In 2020, he released a video on YouTube singing Turkmen song Turkmen Sahrasy.

In October 2021, Philpott was retired from the Diplomatic Service.

== Personal life ==
Hugh Stanley Philpott is married to Janine Frederica Philpott.

Diplomatic posts
| Preceded by Robin Ord-Smith | British Ambassador to Tajikistan; 2015–2019 | Succeeded by Matthew Lawson |
| Preceded by Thorhilda Abbott-Watt | British Ambassador to Turkmenistan; 2019–2021 | Succeeded by Lucia Wilde |
