= List of British consuls in Tonga =

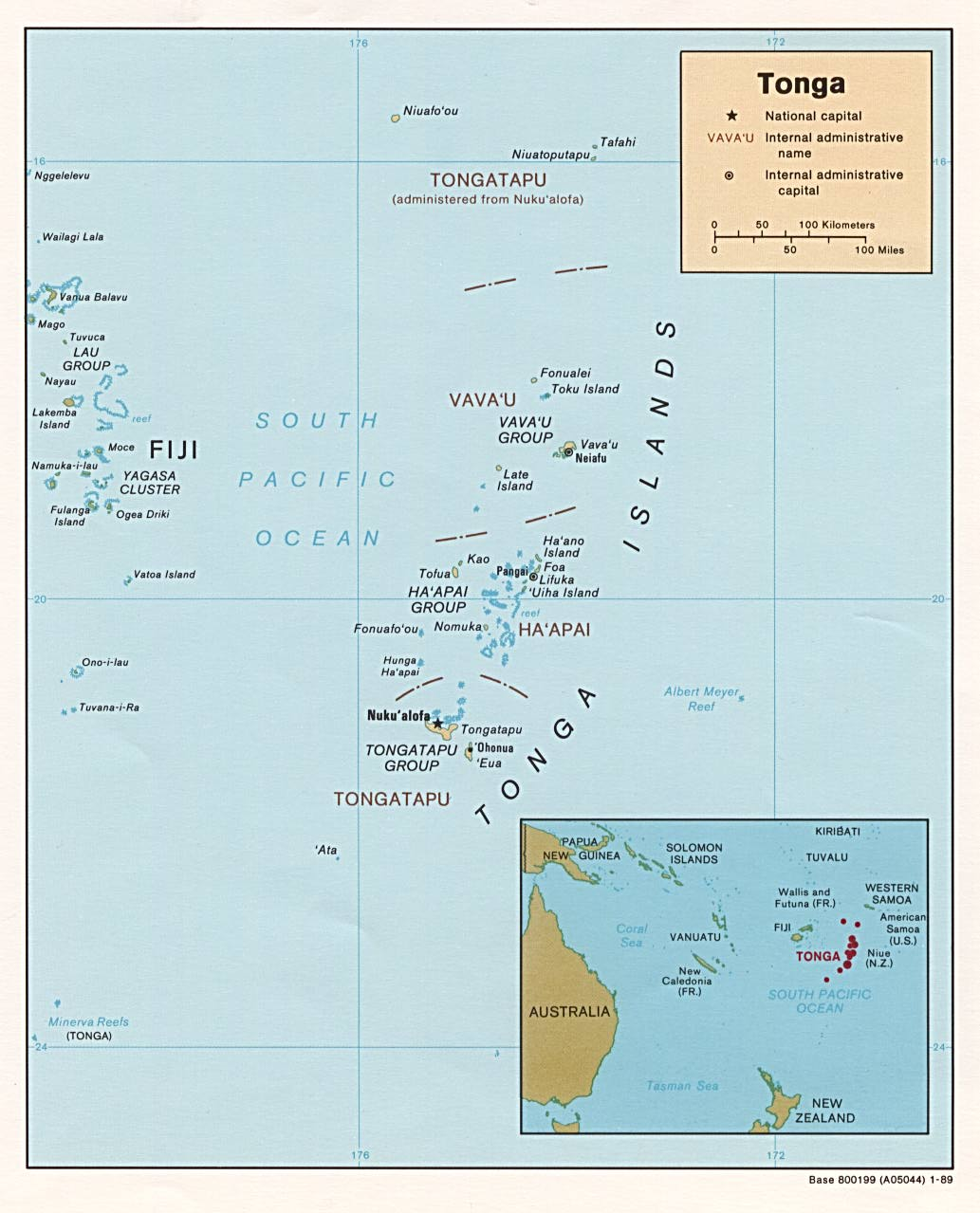
Map of Tonga.

This article lists the British consuls in Tonga from 1901 to 1970. They were responsible for representing British interests in the Kingdom of Tonga while the country was a British protectorate (from 18 May 1900 until 4 June 1970).

For British representatives in Tonga from 1973 until 2006 and since 2019, see: List of high commissioners of the United Kingdom to Tonga.

For British representatives in Tonga from 2006 until 2019, see: List of high commissioners of the United Kingdom to Fiji.

== List ==
(Dates in italics indicate de facto continuation of office)

Term	Incumbent	Notes
1901 to 1909	Hamilton Hunter	
1909 to 1913	William Telfer Campbell	
1913 to 1917	Henry Eugene Walter Grant	
1917 to 1926	Islay McOwan	
1926 to 1937	James Scott Neill	
1937 to 1943	Arthur Leopold Armstrong	
1943 to 1949	Charles Walter Trevor Johnson	
1949 to 1954	James Edward Windrum	
1954 to 1957	Charles Robert Harley Nott	
1957 to 1959	Archibald Cameron Reid	First time
1959 to 1965	Edward James Coode	
1965 to 1970	Archibald Cameron Reid	Second time

== See also ==
- History of Tonga
- Foreign relations of Tonga
