= List of ambassadors of the United Kingdom to Albania =

The ambassador of the United Kingdom to Albania is the United Kingdom's foremost diplomatic representative in the Republic of Albania.

The Treaty of London (1913) recognised the independence of Albania and the Principality of Albania was established in February 1914, but due to World War I and subsequent repercussions, the UK did not establish diplomatic relations until after the League of Nations recognised Albania in December 1920 and an invasion by Yugoslavia which withdrew in November 1921.

In the early years of the Albanian state, diplomatic missions were located in Durazzo (Durrës) and a British Legation was set up there. The embassy in the capital, Tirana, has existed only since diplomatic relations were re-established in 1991 after a long break.

== Heads of mission ==
Envoy Extraordinary and Minister Plenipotentiary

- 1922–1926: Harry Eyres
- 1926: William O'Reilly
- 1926–1928: William Seeds
- 1928–1936: Sir Robert Hodgson
- 1936–1939: Sir Andrew Ryan

Sir Andrew Ryan left shortly after the Italian invasion in April 1939.

Consul-General

- 1939–1940: Laurence Grafftey-Smith
- 1939–1991: No relations due to World War II and Corfu Channel incidents.

Ambassador to Italy (also accredited to Albania)

- 1991–1992: Sir Stephen Egerton
- 1992–1996: Sir Patrick Fairweather

Chargé d'affaires

- 1992–1993: John Duncan
- 1993–1995: Stephen Nash
- 1995–1996: David Slinn
- 1996: Andrew Tesorière

Ambassador Extraordinary and Plenipotentiary

- 1996–1998: Andrew Tesorière
- 1998–1999: Stephen Nash
- 1999–2001: Peter January
- 2001–2003: David Landsman
- 2003–2006: Richard Jones
- 2006–2009: Fraser Wilson
- 2009–2012: Fiona McIlwham
- 2012–2016: Nicholas Cannon
- 2016–2021: Duncan Norman
- 2021–2024: Alastair King-Smith
- 2024-present: Nick Abbott
