= John Peck (diplomat) =

British diplomat (1913–1995)

Sir John Howard Peck KCMG (16 February 1913 – 13 January 1995) was a British diplomat who served as Permanent Representative of the United Kingdom to the Council of Europe from 1959 to 1962, Ambassador to Senegal (with cross-accreditation to Mauritania) from 1962 to 1966, and Ambassador to Ireland from 1970 to 1973. He also served as a Private Secretary to Sir Winston Churchill, and was the only one to serve with him during his wartime term of office between May 1940 to July 1945. He was knighted in 1970.

== Early life ==
Peck was born on 16 February 1913 in Kuala Lumpur in Malaya, now Malaysia. His parents were Howard Peck, a civil engineer, and Dorothea Peck. In 1915, the family returned to England and lived in Basingstoke, Hampshire, and later Northamptonshire. He attended Wellington College, where he was appointed head boy, and received his bachelor's degree from Corpus Christi College, Oxford in 1935 on a scholarship.

== Career ==
Peck was the first British Ambassador to Ireland to have been recruited from the Foreign Office; despite Ireland having left the Commonwealth in 1949, his predecessors had been recruited from the Commonwealth Relations Office or its successor, the Commonwealth Office. During his tenure as Ambassador, the British Embassy in Dublin was burned down by a crowd of 20,000-30,000 people on 2 February 1972, following the Bloody Sunday massacre in Derry on 30 January 1972, when the British Army's Parachute Regiment shot dead 14 unarmed Catholic civilians during a civil rights demonstration.

Despite the strains in relations between the United Kingdom and Ireland in the wake of those events, Peck praised the then Taoiseach, Jack Lynch, of whom he said "all those concerned with, and committed to, peace with justice in the North owe a very great deal to his courage and tenacity", adding that "I do not think that I ever succeeded in convincing British politicians of how much we owed him at that stage, or what the consequences would have been if he had lost his head".

He published his memoirs, Dublin from Downing Street, in 1978.

Diplomatic posts
Preceded by Gerald Meade	Permanent Representative of the United Kingdom to the Council of Europe; 1959–1962	Succeeded by Ivor Porter
Preceded by Adam Watson	British Ambassador to Senegal; 1962–1966	Succeeded by John Tahourdin
Preceded by Andrew Gilchrist	British Ambassador to Ireland; 1970–1973	Succeeded by Sir Arthur Galsworthy
