= John Williams (diplomat) =

British diplomat (1922–2000)

Sir John Williams KCMG

High Commissioner of the United Kingdom to Kenya
- In office 1979–1982
- Preceded by: Sir Stanley Fingland
- Succeeded by: Sir Leonard Allinson

High Commissioner of the United Kingdom to Fiji
- In office 1970–1974
- Preceded by: post established
- Succeeded by: James Stanley Arthur

Personal details
- Born: 15 September 1922
- Died: 21 March 2000 (aged 77)
- Children: 4
- Education: Fitzwilliam College, Cambridge
- Occupation: Diplomat

Sir John Robert Williams (15 September 1922 – 21 March 2000) was a British diplomat who served as high commissioner of the United Kingdom to Fiji from 1970 to 1974 and high commissioner of the United Kingdom to Kenya from 1979 to 1982.

== Early life and education ==
Williams was born on 15 September 1922, the son of Sydney James Williams, an engineer. He was educated at Sheen County School and, after World War II, at Fitzwilliam College, Cambridge, where he took a first in archaeology and anthropology.

Williams served during World War II with the Ist Battalion, King’s African Rifles in East Africa and in the Burma campaign, and was demobilised with the rank of captain.

== Career ==
In 1949, he joined the Colonial Office as assistant principal. In 1956, as first secretary, he was posted to New Delhi before he joined the Commonwealth Relations Office in 1958. From 1959 to 1963, he served as deputy high commissioner in Malaya, and then counsellor at New Delhi from 1963 to 1966. That year he was at the Commonwealth Office, and in 1967 was private secretary to the Commonwealth Secretary George Thomson.

After working in the Diplomatic Service Inspectorate, he was appointed the first high commissioner to newly independent Fiji, a post he held from 1970 to 1974, and then served as minister in Nigeria from 1974 to 1979 while also serving as non-resident ambassador and consul-general for Benin. After a brief spell working as assistant under-secretary for Foreign and Commonwealth Affairs (West and East Africa), he was appointed high commissioner to Kenya in 1979, a post he held until his retirement in 1982.

In retirement Williams became chairman of the Commonwealth Institute in 1984, succeeding David Hunt, and in the same year received a fellowship from Fitzwilliam College, Cambridge.

== Personal life and death ==
Williams married in 1958, Helga Elizabeth Lund whom he met in Delhi while she was working as a secretary in the Norwegian Embassy, and they had two sons and two daughters.

Williams died on 24 March 2000, aged 77.

== Honours ==
Williams was appointed Companion of the Order of St Michael and St George (CMG) in the 1973 New Year Honours, and promoted to Knight Commander (KCMG) in the 1982 Birthday Honours.

== See also ==
- Fiji–United Kingdom relations
- Kenya–United Kingdom relations

Diplomatic posts
Preceded by post established	High Commissioner of the United Kingdom to Fiji; 1970–1974	Succeeded by James Stanley Arthur
Preceded by Sir Stanley Fingland	High Commissioner of the United Kingdom to Kenya; 1979–1982	Succeeded by Sir Leonard Allinson
