= Brian Bennett (diplomat) =

British diplomat

British Ambassador to Belarus
- In office 2003–2007
- Preceded by: Iain Kelly
- Succeeded by: Michael Haddock

Personal details
- Born: 1 April 1948 (age 78) United Kingdom
- Education: University of Sheffield

Brian Maurice Bennett (born 1 April 1948) is a former British diplomat.

Bennett studied Russian at the University of Sheffield.

== Career ==
He entered the Foreign and Commonwealth Office in 1971. After two years as a desk officer, he received his first foreign posting, as an information secretary at the British embassy to Czechoslovakia, where he served until 1976, when he was transferred back to London to serve in the FCO's personnel department. After further stints at the British embassies to Finland and Barbados, he served as first secretary in the British delegation at the Mutual and Balanced Force Reductions talks in Vienna and in the British embassy in the Netherlands.

In 1992, Bennett returned to Whitehall as a desk officer. In 1997, he received another foreign posting, this time as Deputy Head of Mission in Tunis, where he served until 2000. He subsequently served as British Ambassador to Belarus from 2003 to 2007.

In 2005 his name appeared on a list of alleged Secret Intelligence Service personnel published on the US website Cryptome.

Diplomatic posts
Preceded by Iain Kelly	British Ambassador to Belarus; 2003–2007	Succeeded by Michael Haddock
