= List of ambassadors of the United Kingdom to Guinea =

The ambassador of the United Kingdom to Guinea is the United Kingdom's foremost diplomatic representative in the Republic of Guinea, and head of the UK's diplomatic mission in Conakry.

The Republic of Guinea (formerly known as French Guinea) declared its independence from France on 2 October 1958, and the then UK ambassador to Liberia, Guy Clarke, was also accredited to Guinea in 1959 until the first resident ambassador arrived in 1960. In 1965 the mission was briefly combined with Mali before a break in diplomatic relations; when relations were resumed in 1970 the mission was combined with Senegal until 2000 and with Sierra Leone until 2003.

== List of heads of mission ==
=== Ambassadors ===
- 1959–1960: Guy Clarke (non-resident)
- 1960–1962: Donald Logan
- 1962–1965: Hilary William King
- 1965: John Waterfield (non-resident)
- 1965–1970: Diplomatic relations severed over Rhodesia
- 1970–1971: John Tahourdin (non-resident)
- 1971–1973: Ivor Porter (non-resident)
- 1973–1976: Denzil Dunnett (non-resident)
- 1976–1979: John Powell-Jones (non-resident)
- 1979–1982: William Squire (non-resident)
- 1982–1985: Laurence O'Keeffe (non-resident)
- 1985–1990: John Macrae (non-resident)
- 1990–1993: Roger Beetham (non-resident)
- 1993–1997: Alan Furness (non-resident)
- 1997–2000: David Snoxell (non-resident)
- 2000–2003: Alan Jones (non-resident)
- 2003–2004: Helen Horn
- 2004–2008: John McManus
- 2008–2011: Ian Felton
- 2011–2015: Graham Styles
- 2015: Ian Richards (chargé d'affaires)
- 2015–2019: Catherine Inglehearn
- 2019–2022: David McIlroy
- 2023–2025: John Marshall
- 2025–present: Daniel Shepherd
