= George Norman Stansfield =

British diplomat (1926–2018)

His Excellency George Norman Stansfield CBE

British High Commissioner to the Solomon Islands
- In office 1982–1986
- Preceded by: Gordon Slater
- Succeeded by: John Noss

Personal details
- Born: 28 February 1926
- Died: 18 April 2018 (aged 92)
- Spouse: Elizabeth Margaret Williams
- Occupation: Diplomat
- Military career
- Allegiance: United Kingdom
- Branch: Royal Air Force
- Service years: 1944–1946

George Norman Stansfield CBE (28 February 1926 – 15 April 2018) was a British diplomat who worked for the United Kingdom's Foreign and Commonwealth Office and served as the British High Commissioner to Solomon Islands (1982–86).

== Career ==
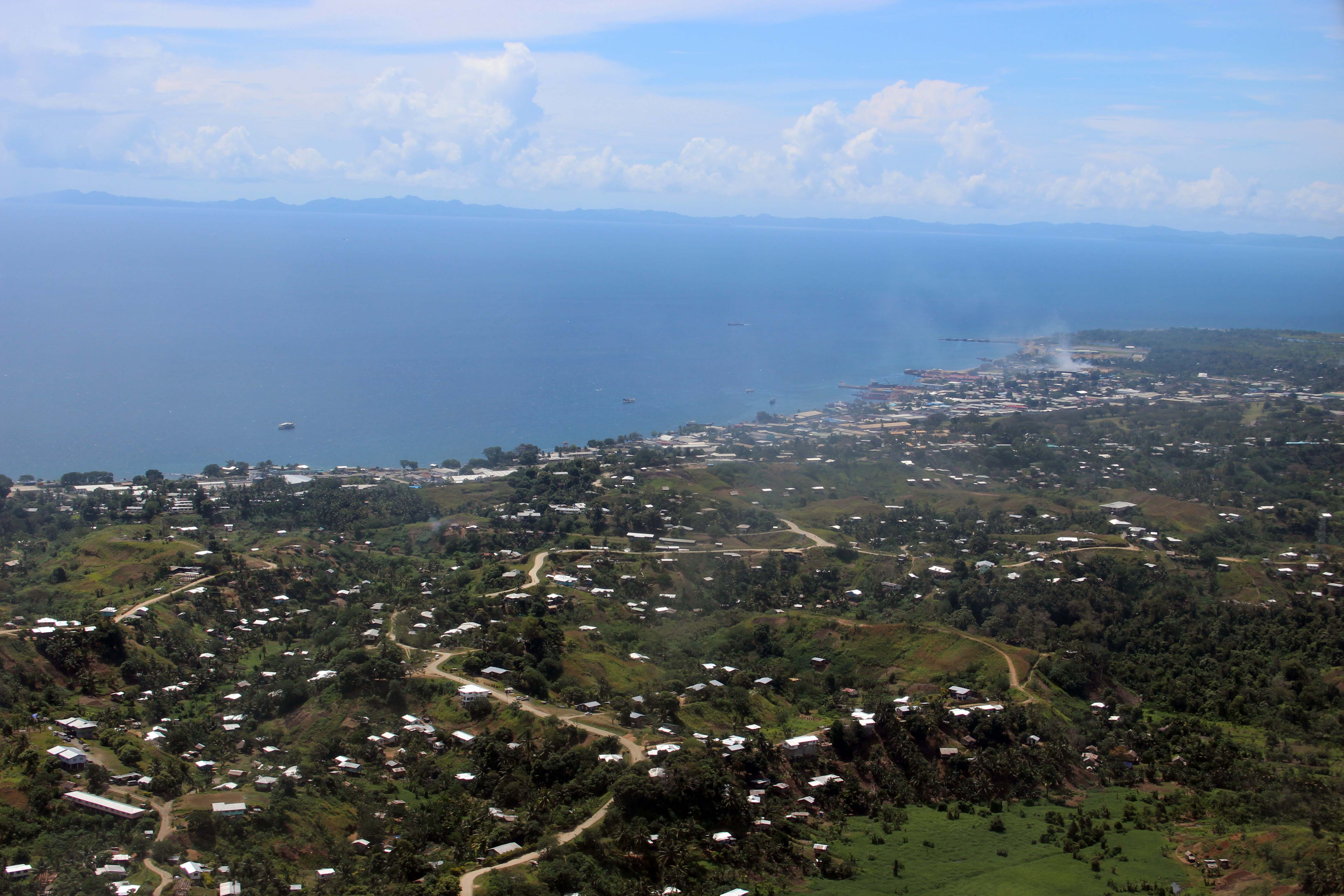
View of Honiara, Solomon Islands.

Stansfield was the son of George and Alice Stansfield and was born in Manchester, Lancashire, England on 28 February 1926. He joined the Royal Air Force in 1944 and served during the Second World War. He joined the Civil Service, in the Ministries of Food and Supply, from 1948 to 1958. He joined the Foreign and Commonwealth Office and was Assistant (or Private Secretary) to the Director-General of Armaments Production in the War Office from 1958 to 1961.

He joined the Commonwealth Office in 1961 and became Second Secretary to Calcutta, India, from 1962 to 1966, and to Port of Spain, Trinidad and Tobago, from 1966. He became First Secretary in the Foreign and Commonwealth Office from 1968 until 1971, and also served in Singapore from 1971 to 1974. He was appointed as Consul at the Consulate-General in Durban, South Africa, in 1974.

In the Foreign and Commonwealth Office from 1978, Stansfield became First Secretary then Counsellor, and was Head of the Overseas Estate (Accommodation and Services) Department from 1980 to 1982. Stansfield succeeded Gordon Slater as the British High Commissioner to the Solomon Islands in 1982, serving for four years until he was succeeded by John Noss in 1986. He was later a consultant and instructor in the Foreign and Commonwealth Office until his retirement in 2002.

== Honours ==
Stansfield was appointed an Officer of the Order of the British Empire (OBE) in the 1980 New Year Honours and a Commander of the Order of the British Empire (CBE) in the 1985 Birthday Honours.

== See also ==
- List of high commissioners of the United Kingdom to the Solomon Islands

Diplomatic posts
Preceded by Gordon Slater	British High Commissioner to the Solomon Islands; 1982–1986	Succeeded by John Noss
