= Governor Hennessy =

Governor Hennessy may refer to:

- James Hennessy (diplomat) (1923–2024), Governor of British Honduras from 1980 to 1981
- John Pope Hennessy (1834–1891), Governor of Labuan, the Gold Coast, Sierra Leone, the Bahamas, Barbados and the Windward Islands, Hong Kong, and Mauritius for various terms between 1867 and 1889
