= Judith Gough =

British diplomat

Her Excellency Judith Gough CMG
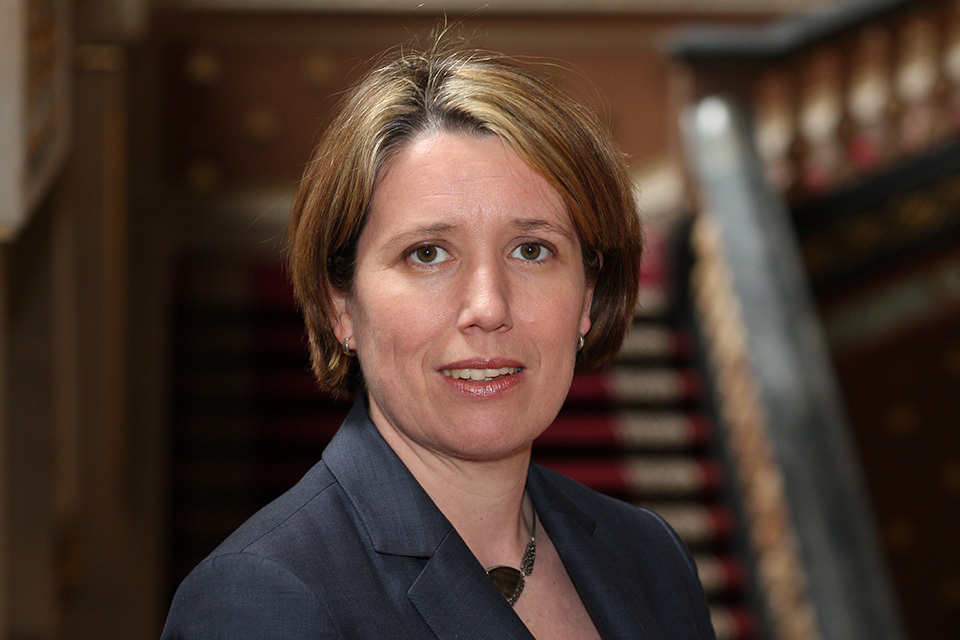

British Ambassador to Sweden
- In office August 2019 – July 2024
- Monarchs: Elizabeth II; Charles III
- Prime Minister: Boris Johnson; Liz Truss; Rishi Sunak; Keir Starmer
- Preceded by: David Cairns
- Succeeded by: Samantha Job

British Ambassador to Ukraine
- In office September 2015 – August 2019
- Monarch: Elizabeth II
- Prime Minister: David Cameron; Theresa May; Boris Johnson
- Preceded by: Simon Smith
- Succeeded by: Melinda Simmons

British Ambassador to Georgia
- In office September 2010 – January 2013
- Monarch: Elizabeth II
- Prime Minister: David Cameron
- Preceded by: Denis Keefe
- Succeeded by: David Moran

Personal details
- Born: 8 November 1972 (age 53)
- Children: 2
- Education: University of Nottingham; King's College London

Judith Mary Gough CMG (born 8 November 1972) is a British diplomat and has formerly served as the British ambassador to Sweden (2019–2024), Ukraine (2015–19) and Georgia (2010–2013).

== Early life and career ==
Gough was educated at the University of Nottingham (BA in German and Russian, 1995) and at King's College London (MA in War in the Modern World, 2012). She then worked as a Consultant in emerging markets and financial services at Ernst and Young.

== Diplomatic career ==
Gough joined the Foreign & Commonwealth Office (FCO) in 2001. Gough then served at the British embassy in South Korea. Starting from mid-September 2010 she was the Ambassador of the United Kingdom to the Republic of Georgia, and served as such till she was released of her post early 2013.

She then became FCO's Director for Eastern Europe and Central Asia.

In September 2015, Gough was appointed Ambassador of the United Kingdom in Ukraine.

In June 2019, Gough was appointed Ambassador of the United Kingdom in Sweden. She took up her appointment in August.

== Personal life ==
Gough is openly lesbian and raises two children with her partner, Julia Kleiousi.

Diplomatic posts
| Preceded by Denis Keefe | British Ambassador to Georgia; 2010–2013 | Succeeded by Alexandra Hall Hall |
| Preceded by Simon Smith | British Ambassador to Ukraine; 2015–2019 | Succeeded by Melinda Simmons |
| Preceded by David Cairns | British Ambassador to Sweden; 2019–2024 | Succeeded by Samantha Louise Job |
Government offices
| Preceded by Colin Roberts | Director, Eastern Europe and Central Asia, Foreign & Commonwealth Office; 2014–2015 | Succeeded by Michael Tatham |
