= Thorhilda Abbott-Watt =

British diplomat

Her Excellency Thorhilda Abbott-Watt

British High Commissioner to Tonga
- In office February 2020 – September 2020
- Monarch: Elizabeth II
- Prime Minister: Theresa May; Boris Johnson; Liz Truss; Rishi Sunak
- Preceded by: Independent office re-established replacing Melanie Hopkins as non-resident High Commissioner (Paul Nessling last resident High Commissioner in 2006)
- Succeeded by: Lucy Joyce

British Ambassador to Turkmenistan
- In office December 2016 – 2019
- Monarch: Elizabeth II
- Prime Minister: Theresa May; Boris Johnson
- Preceded by: Sanjay Wadvani
- Succeeded by: Hugh Philpott

Personal details
- Born: 11 February 1955 (age 71) London
- Occupation: Diplomat

Thorhilda Mary Vivia "Thorda" Abbott-Watt OBE (born 11 February 1955) is an English diplomat who has represented the United Kingdom in a number of countries. From 2016 to 2019 she was British Ambassador to Turkmenistan.

== Career ==
Abbott-Watt joined the Foreign and Commonwealth Office (FCO) in 1974 and has worked both in London and in a number of countries in South America, the Far East and Western and Eastern Europe. In 1989 she served in the FCO, negotiating the renunciation of Four Power Rights in Germany. From 2001 to 2002 she was Chargée d'Affaires, opening the first British Embassy in Dushanbe, Tajikistan.

In 2003 Abbott-Watt became Ambassador to Armenia, a role she held for two years. In 2004, questions were raised about her competency in a letter to Foreign and Commonwealth Secretary, Jack Straw by scholar Tessa Hofmann and the International Group on Genocide Recognition and Prevention, after she made a statement at a press conference on 20 January 2004 questioning the use of the term genocide for the Armenian genocide. Abbott-Watt said, "Great Britain accepts that the events of 1915 were mass killings [of the Armenian population] – the responsible for which are the Turks. I see no problem calling it brutality. It shouldn’t have taken place even in the course of war. But I do not think that recognizing the events as genocide would be of much use."

In 2006, Abbott-Watt worked briefly as Head of Political and Military Section in Kabul, then undertook an attachment to UK Trade & Investment as Head of Strategy and Innovation. She served as Ambassador to Mongolia from 2008 to 2009 and from 2010 to 2012. In May 2016, she was appointed Ambassador to Turkmenistan.

Abbott-Watt was appointed Officer of the Order of the British Empire (OBE) in the 2017 Birthday Honours. In 2020, she was appointed as the British High Commissioner to Tonga but had to leave that country after a short time on the onset of the COVID-19 pandemic. She worked for a time on repatriation of people who had been trapped overseas by COVID-related travel disruption, then retired after a 46-year career in the Foreign Office and then the Foreign Commonwealth and Development Office.

== Personal life ==
Abbott-Watt is married to Reef Talbot Hogg. Her father was a soldier and diplomat. She was educated at Stonar School, Wiltshire.
