= Charles Crawford (diplomat) =

British diplomat, non-practising barrister, communications consultant and writer

Charles Graham Crawford CMG (born 1954) is a British former diplomat, non-practising barrister, communications consultant, and writer.

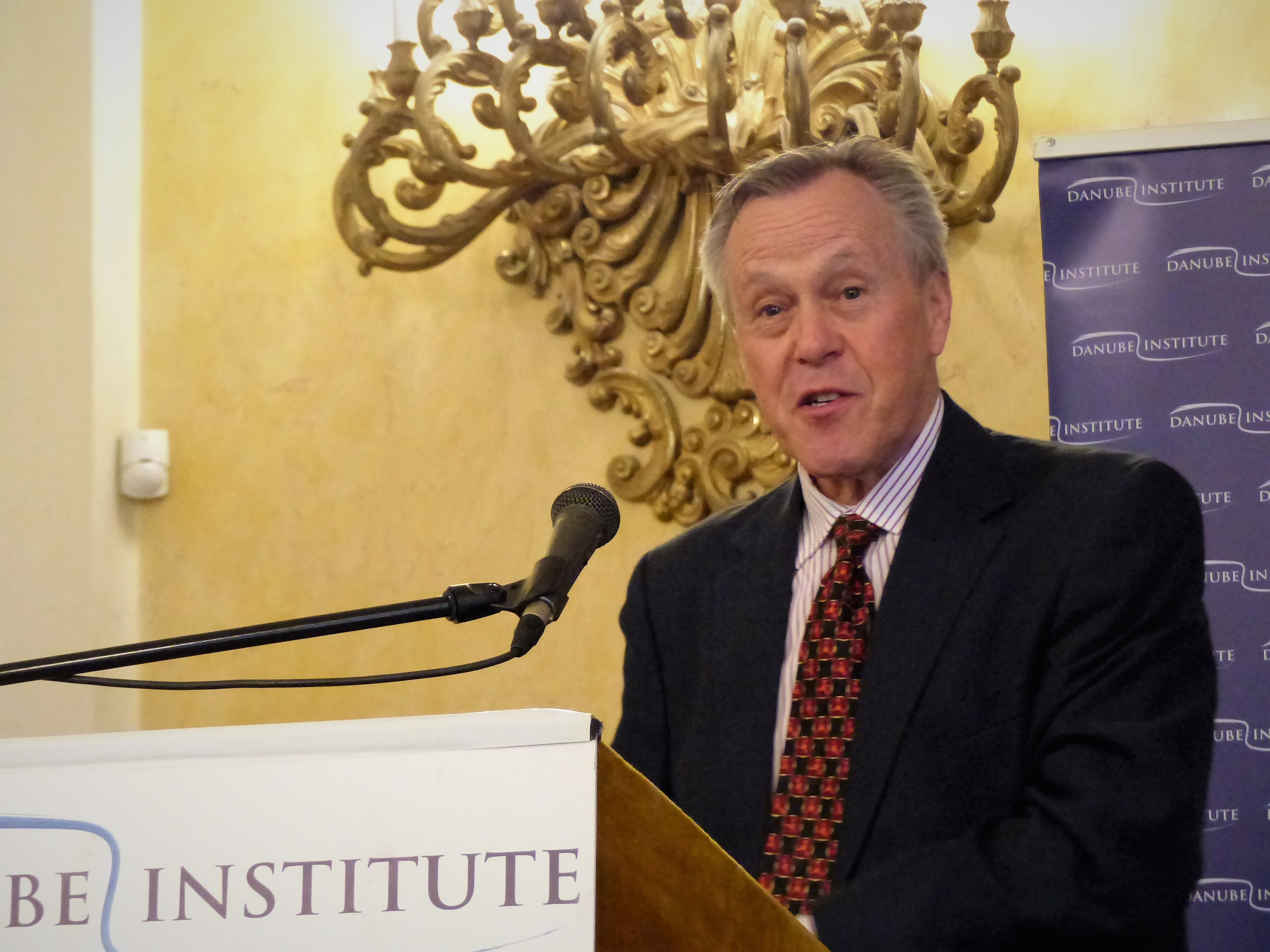
Charles Crawford at Danube Institute, Budapest

== Biography ==
Crawford was educated at St Albans School; St John's College, Oxford (BA); and the Fletcher School of Law and Diplomacy at Tufts University (MA). He also passed Part II Bar Exams to qualify as a barrister and is a member of Lincoln's Inn. He never practised as a barrister, instead joining the Foreign and Commonwealth Office (FCO) in 1979. His diplomatic career featured extensive policy work in London and at Post on the transition in central and eastern Europe from communism to democratic pluralism. He was appointed CMG in 1998 for his ambassadorial work in post-conflict Bosnia and Herzegovina.

Crawford speaks (to varying degree) Polish, Serbo-Croatian, Russian, French and Afrikaans. He is married to Helen née Walsh and they have three children.

== Career ==
During his FCO career he was known for an unconventional style. In Belgrade he borrowed two kangaroos from a local zoo for a commercial reception. He attracted local controversy in Sarajevo, Belgrade and Podgorica for his high-profile work in support of democratic forces and against ICTY war crimes suspects and organised crime. In 2003 he intervened on behalf of a large group of Newcastle United supporters, in Belgrade for a match against Partizan Belgrade; after the local police refused to let the fans leave their hotel, he invited them all to his Residence.

He left Warsaw in September 2007 and the FCO at the end of 2007 to start a new private communications consultancy career. In 2009/2010 he was accepted on the Conservative Party candidates’ list but was not selected to campaign for a seat in the 2010 General Election. Since leaving the FCO in 2007 he has written articles on diplomacy and current affairs for Radio Free Europe, The Guardian, The Independent, The Daily Telegraph, National Review as well as Total Politics and Diplomat magazines.

In April 2010 after the Smolensk air disaster he appeared on BBC, CNN and Sky TV describing his personal memories of President Lech Kaczynski. He is a founder member of The Ambassador Partnership, a panel of former Ambassadors set up in 2010 offering corporate diplomacy services in consultancy, mediation and training. In 2010 he joined Specialist Speakers as a diplomatic adviser.

In 2016 and 2017 he won Cicero Awards for speechwriting.

Crawford has written for newspapers on current events, such as his piece on how the Helsinki Accords of 1975 impact the annexation of Crimea by the Russian Federation. In an article published in the Israel Journal of Foreign Affairs on the subject of the Russo-Ukrainian War, Crawford compared it to Middle Eastern peace processes; "If openly or by implication one party in a conflict is challenging the other party’s core legitimacy, if not its very right to exist, what scope is there for meaningful discussion and hard but honest compromise around a negotiating table?"

As of 2025, Crawford is listed by the UK Government's Foreign Influence Registration Scheme as a paid lobbyist for the pro-Russian Republika Srpska.

== Timeline ==
1979–80: FCO: Desk Officer for Indonesia
1980–81: Serbo-Croat language training
1981–84: British Embassy Belgrade
1984–85: FCO: Desk Officer for Air Services (notably UK/US Air Services)
1985–87: FCO: Speechwriter
1987–91: British Embassy Cape Town/Pretoria
1991–93: FCO: Soviet then Eastern Department (UK policy towards the Soviet Union, then Russia and CIS)
1993–96: British Embassy Moscow
1996–98: HM Ambassador to Sarajevo
1998–99: Mid-career development fellowship at Harvard University (Weatherhead Center for International Affairs)
1999–00: FCO: Deputy Political Director, then Director South-Eastern Europe
2001–03: HM Ambassador to Belgrade
2003–07: HM Ambassador to Warsaw
2007: Left FCO to start a private career

Diplomatic posts
Preceded by Bryan Hopkinson	Ambassador of the United Kingdom to Bosnia and Herzegovina; 1996–1998	Succeeded by Graham Hand
Preceded by David Landsman	Ambassador of the United Kingdom to Serbia; 2001–2003	Succeeded by Sarah Price
Preceded by Sir Michael Pakenham	Ambassador of the United Kingdom to Poland; 2003–2007	Succeeded by Ric Todd
