= Jacqueline Perkins (diplomat) =

British diplomat

Jacqueline Perkins OBE
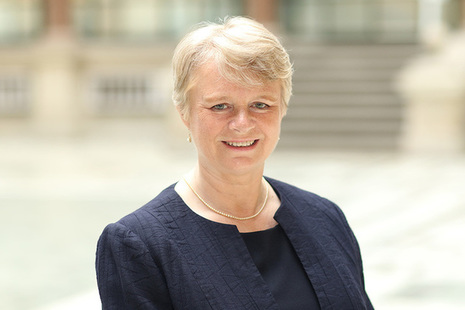

British Ambassador to Belarus
- In office August 2019 – August 2024
- Monarchs: Elizabeth II; Charles III
- Prime Minister: Boris Johnson; Liz Truss; Rishi Sunak; Keir Starmer
- Preceded by: Fionna Gibb
- Succeeded by: David Ward (temporary chargé d'affaires)

Personal details
- Born: Jacqueline Louise Perkins Cornwall, England
- Children: 2
- Education: University of Cambridge; University of Notre Dame (MA)
- Occupation: Diplomat

Jacqueline Louise "Jacky" Perkins OBE is a British diplomat who was the British Ambassador to Belarus from 2019 until 2024. Previous to that, she was the deputy head of mission in Kuwait.

== Consular career ==
Perkins joined the Foreign and Commonwealth Office in 1989 as an Assistant Desk Officer for the East Africa Department. In 1990, she underwent full-time Arabic language training courses and after two years was posted to the British Embassy in Abu Dhabi.

In 1995, she was recalled to become the head of the Germany and Austria Section in the West Europe Department of the FCO. She stayed at the FCO in various posts until 1999 when she became the Head of Political, Economic and Development Section in Cairo. From 2003 until 2008, she was a regional adviser in Bahrain and in 2008, she became a Strategic Policy Adviser at the FCO's Strategy Unit. She became the Deputy Head of Mission in Kuwait in 2013, a post she held until 2018.

In 2018, Perkins underwent an intensive Russian language course. She was announced as the new UK Ambassador to Belarus and the successor to Fionna Gibb in June 2019, and took up her post in August.

In October 2019, Perkins called on Belarus to drop the death penalty as part of International Day Against the Death Penalty. In February 2020, Perkins said she was trying to "maintain momentum" in increased international trade and does not expect any changes after Brexit. In October 2020, Foreign Secretary Dominic Raab temporarily recalled Perkins amid civil unrest in Belarus triggered by allegations of electoral fraud against President Alexander Lukashenko. In March 2023, Perkins attended commemorative events for the 80th anniversary of the Khatyn massacre.

Perkins was appointed Officer of the Order of the British Empire (OBE) in the 2024 New Year Honours for services to British foreign policy.

== Personal life ==
Perkins has a degree in Modern Languages from Cambridge University and a MA in International Relations from the University of Notre Dame, Indiana. She has two children.

Diplomatic posts
Preceded by Fionna Gibb	United Kingdom Ambassador to Belarus; 2019–present	Succeeded by Incumbent
