= Denis Keefe =

British diplomat (born 1958)

Denis Keefe CMG
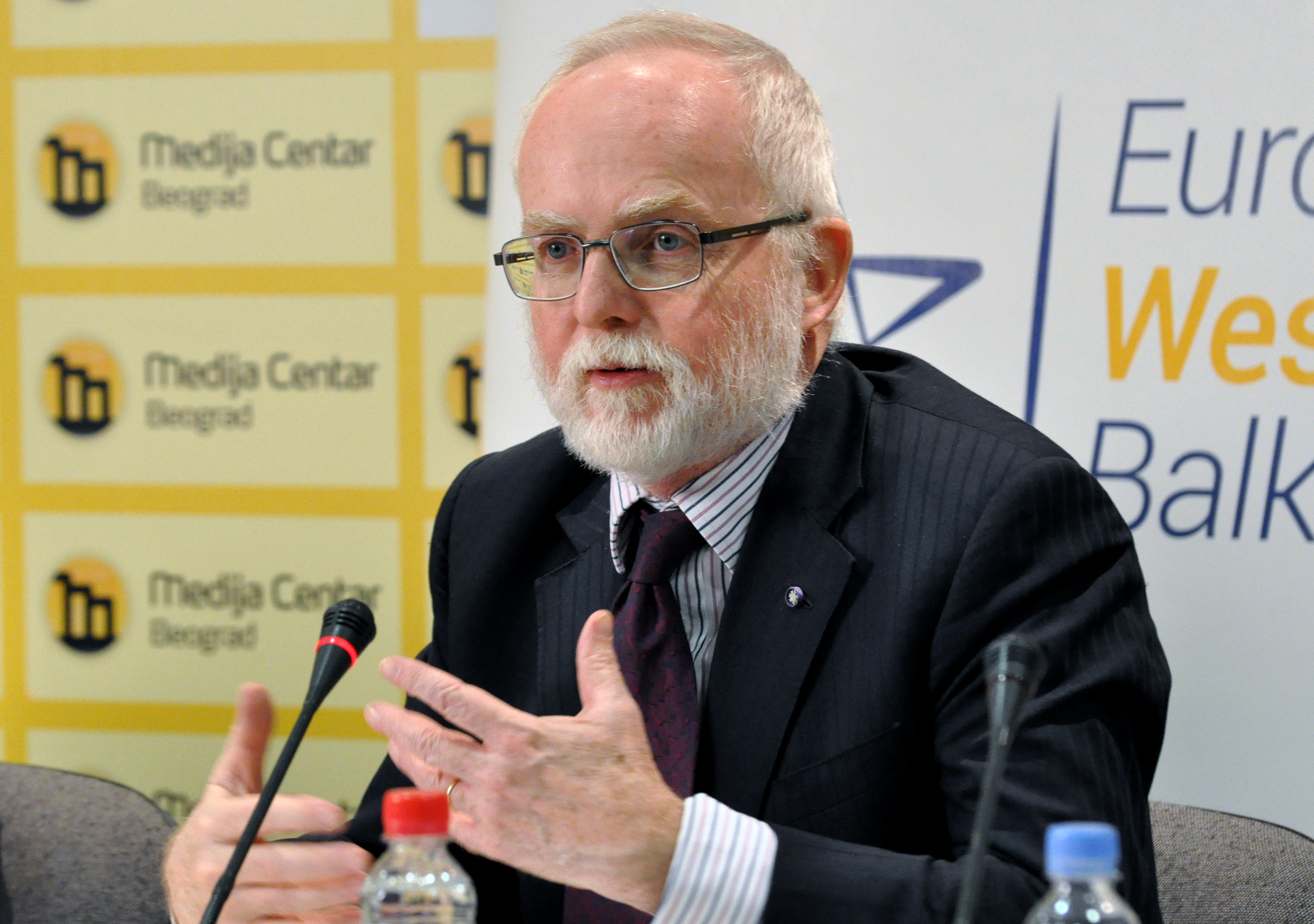
- Born: Denis Edward Peter Paul Keefe; 29 June 1958 (age 68)
- Education: The Campion School
- Alma mater: Churchill College, Cambridge; Hertford College, Oxford

Denis Edward Peter Paul Keefe CMG (born 29 June 1958) is a British diplomat and former Ambassador to Serbia and to Georgia.

== Biography ==
Keefe was educated at The Campion School and studied Classics at Churchill College, Cambridge and Hellenistic Greek poetry at Hertford College, Oxford. He joined the Diplomatic Service in 1982 and served at Nairobi and twice at Prague as well as at the Foreign and Commonwealth Office (FCO) in London. In 2007, he studied Georgian and Russian at Malmö University in preparation for his appointment as ambassador.

Keefe was Ambassador to Georgia 2007–10 including the Russo-Georgian war in 2008. He was one of the victims of the 2010 Georgian news report hoax.

Keefe was Minister and Deputy Head of Mission in Moscow 2010–14. During this time, Russian media harassed him and accused him of being a MI6 officer, possibly because of his supposed actions in Georgia.

Keefe was appointed Ambassador to Serbia from June 2014. In 2019, he was succeeded in the role by Sian MacLeod. He was appointed Companion of the Order of St Michael and St George (CMG) in the 2016 New Year Honours.

Diplomatic posts
Preceded by Donald MacLaren	Ambassador to Georgia; 2007–2010	Succeeded by Judith Gough
Preceded by Michael Davenport	Ambassador to Serbia; 2014–2019	Succeeded by Sian MacLeod
