= Alice Walpole =

British diplomat

The Honourable Alice Walpole OBE
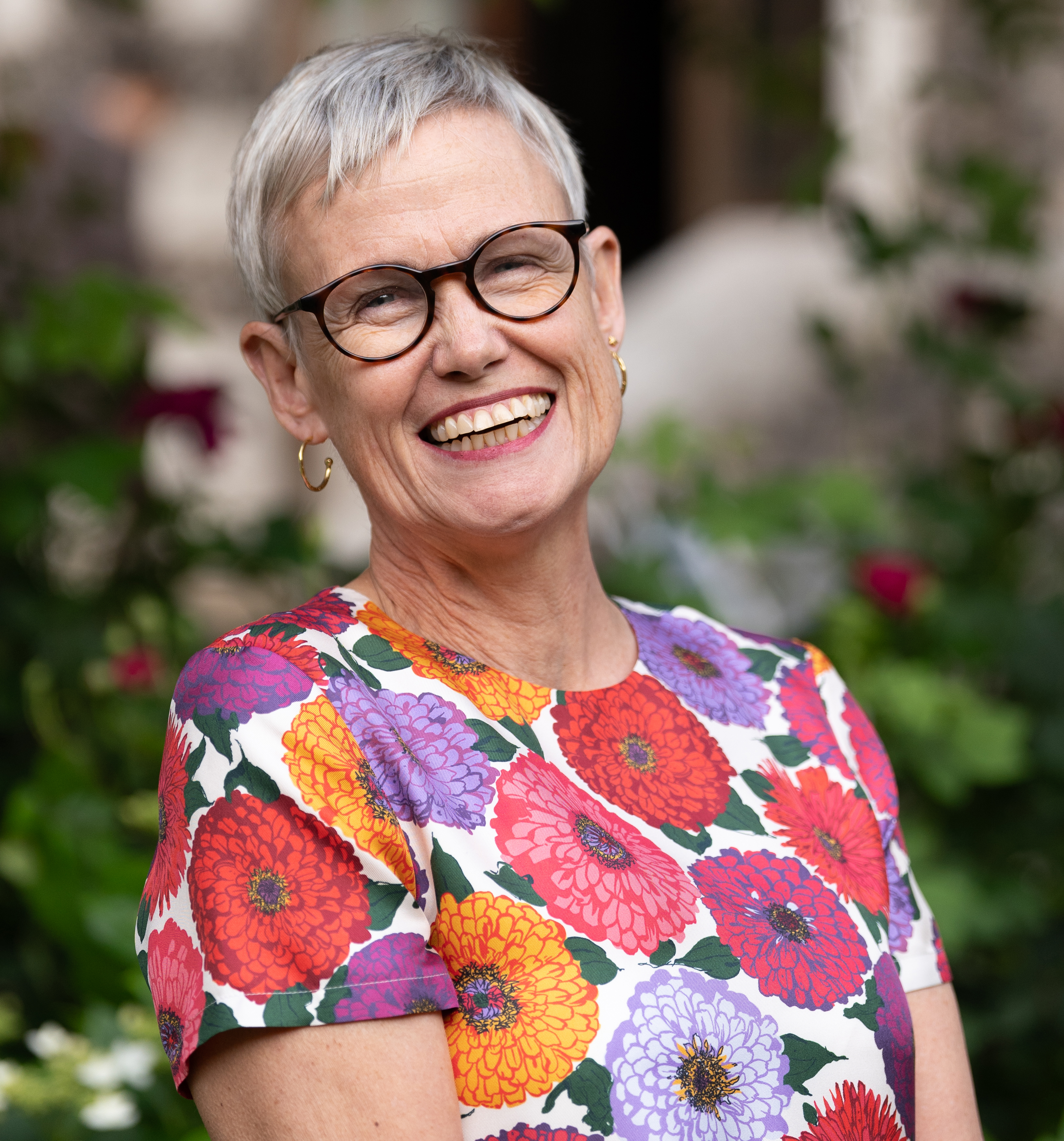
- Walpole in 2025

British Ambassador to Mali
- In office 2016–2017
- Monarch: Elizabeth II
- Prime Minister: Theresa May
- Preceded by: Joanne Adamson
- Succeeded by: Catherine Evans

British Ambassador to Luxembourg
- In office 2011–2016
- Monarch: Elizabeth II
- Prime Minister: David Cameron
- Preceded by: Peter Bateman
- Succeeded by: John Marshall

Personal details
- Born: Alice Louise Walpole; 1 September 1963 (age 63) Norwich, Norfolk, England
- Spouse: Angel Carro Castrillo (m. 1990; div. 2010)
- Children: 6
- Parent(s): Robert Walpole, 10th Baron Walpole; Judith Chaplin
- Education: New Hall, Cambridge

Alice Louise Walpole, OBE (born 1 September 1963), is the Director of Goodenough College, a residential community of international postgraduate students in Bloomsbury, London. As a former British diplomat and United Nations official, she served from 2017 to 2021, as an Assistant Secretary-General of the United Nations and Deputy Special Representative for Political Affairs and Electoral Assistance in the United Nations Assistance Mission for Iraq (UNAMI). Prior to her UN role, she spent over 30 years in the British Diplomatic Service, including appointments as British Ambassador to Luxembourg, Mali and (non-resident) Niger.

== Career ==
Walpole was educated at Norwich High School for Girls and New Hall, Cambridge (now Murray Edwards College).

She joined the Foreign and Commonwealth Office (FCO) in 1985. Following a posting as HM Consul-General in Basra, Iraq (2009–11), she became British Ambassador to the Grand Duchy of Luxembourg in July 2011. In 2016 she became Ambassador to the Republic of Mali and non-resident Ambassador to the Republic of Niger. In November 2017 United Nations Secretary-General António Guterres announced the appointment of Alice Walpole as the new Deputy Special Representative for Political Affairs and Electoral Assistance of the United Nations Assistance Mission for Iraq (UNAMI). She held this post until March 2021.

She was appointed Officer of the Order of the British Empire (OBE) in the 2017 New Year Honours for services to British Diplomacy.

Walpole was appointed Director of Goodenough College in April 2021.

She was awarded the Freedom of the City of London in 2024.

Walpole is a Member of the Council of Arts and Sciences, the board of the Royal Albert Hall.

== Personal life ==
Walpole is a daughter of Robert Walpole, 10th Baron Walpole, and his first wife, Judith Chaplin (née Schofield, later Judith Chaplin, OBE, MP for Newbury and Hungerford), and a descendant of Horatio Walpole, 1st Baron Walpole (of Wolterton), a younger brother of Sir Robert Walpole, the first British Prime Minister. Her ancestors include Sir Robert Walpole's father Colonel Robert Walpole (1650–1700). The brother, Thomas, of her great-grandfather Horatio (1881-1918) was the cycling partner of Lionel Martin, of Aston Martin.

In 1990, she married Dr Angel Carro Castrillo (of Switzerland), with whom she has six children. They divorced in 2010, having separated in 2002.

Diplomatic posts
Preceded by Peter Bateman	British Ambassador to Luxembourg; 2011–2016	Succeeded by John Marshall
Preceded by Joanne Adamson	British Ambassador to Mali; 2016–2017	Succeeded by Catherine Evans
