= Matthew Rycroft =

British civil servant and diplomat (born 1968)

Sir Matthew Rycroft KCMG CBE
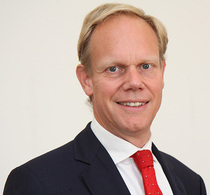

Permanent Under-Secretary of State at the Home Office
- In office 23 March 2020 – 28 March 2025
- Home Secretary: Priti Patel; Suella Braverman; Grant Shapps; Suella Braverman; James Cleverly; Yvette Cooper
- Preceded by: Sir Philip Rutnam
- Succeeded by: Dame Antonia Romeo

Permanent Under-Secretary of State for International Development
- In office 22 January 2018 – 20 March 2020
- Secretary of State: Penny Mordaunt; Rory Stewart; Alok Sharma; Anne-Marie Trevelyan
- Preceded by: Mark Lowcock
- Succeeded by: Office abolished

Permanent Representative of the United Kingdom to the United Nations
- In office 25 April 2015 – 19 January 2018
- Monarch: Elizabeth II
- Prime Minister: David Cameron; Theresa May
- Preceded by: Mark Lyall Grant
- Succeeded by: Karen Pierce

Her Majesty's Ambassador to Bosnia and Herzegovina
- In office 1 March 2005 – 30 July 2008
- Monarch: Elizabeth II
- Prime Minister: Tony Blair; Gordon Brown
- Preceded by: Ian Cliff
- Succeeded by: Michael Tatham

Personal details
- Born: 16 June 1968 (age 58) Southampton, Hampshire, England
- Education: Merton College, Oxford (BA)

Sir Matthew John Rycroft KCMG CBE (/ˈraɪkrɒft/; born 16 June 1968) is a British civil servant and diplomat who served as Permanent Under-Secretary of State at the Home Office from March 2020 to March 2025, appointed following the resignation of Sir Philip Rutnam. Rycroft previously served as Permanent Secretary at the Department for International Development (DFID) from 2018 to 2020 and as the Permanent Representative to the United Nations in New York from 2015 to 2018.

== Early life and education ==
The son of Professor Michael Rycroft, Rycroft was born in Southampton, before moving to Cambridge at the age of eleven, when his father joined the British Antarctic Survey. He was educated at the Leys School between 1981 and 1986 and now chairs the school's governing body.

He next studied mathematics and philosophy at Merton College, Oxford, graduating BA in 1989.

== Career ==
Rycroft joined the Foreign and Commonwealth Office (FCO) in 1989. he was a Third Secretary in Geneva from 1990 to 1991, then was posted to the British Embassy in Paris until 1995. While there he was in the Chancery section and was promoted to Second Secretary. He returned to the FCO as a First Secretary in 1995. In 1995–96, Rycroft was Head of Section in the Eastern Adriatic Unit at the FCO: a demanding role, given the aftermath of the Yugoslav Wars. Very soon after taking up this role, he served as a member of the British deputation to the Dayton peace talks. Between 1996 and 1998 he was a desk officer in the FCO Policy Planners. He was next posted as First Secretary (Political) to the embassy in Washington, 1998–2002.

In 2002, Rycroft was appointed Private Secretary to Prime Minister Tony Blair, to advise him on matters related to foreign policy, the European Union, Northern Ireland and defence. During this time Rycroft wrote a letter to Mark Sedwill, private secretary to the foreign secretary, Jack Straw. The letter reveals that "we and the US would take action" without a new resolution by the UN security council if UN weapons inspectors showed Saddam had clearly breached an earlier resolution. In that case, he "would not have a second chance". That was the only way Britain could persuade the Bush administration to agree to a role for the UN and continuing work by UN weapons inspectors, the letter says. Dated 17 October 2002. "This letter is sensitive," Rycroft underlined. "It must be seen only by those with a real need to know its contents, and must not be copied further."

It was in this capacity that Rycroft issued the "Downing Street memo". During his time in Downing Street, in 2003, he was made a CBE.

Rycroft's appointment as Private Secretary for Foreign Affairs to the Prime Minister ended in 2004. He was British Ambassador to Bosnia and Herzegovina, 2005–2008, then until 2011 was back at the FCO as Director for the EU, later Europe. He was Chief Operating Officer at the FCO, 2011–14.

He became Permanent Representative to the United Nations in New York in April 2015, serving until 2018.

=== Downing Street memo ===
Rycroft's name became familiar to the general public as the author of a secret memo to the British Ambassador to the United States, David Manning, summarizing a 23 July 2002 meeting with Blair and other government officials "to discuss Iraq". The memo was leaked to The Sunday Times, which printed it on 1 May 2005.

The memo includes discussion of a "shift of attitude" in the Bush administration which made it appear that at this point, while the public was still being told that Iraq could avoid an invasion by agreeing to abide by UN resolutions,

Military action was now seen as inevitable.

The memo went on to state

Bush wanted to remove Saddam, through military action, justified by the conjunction of terrorism and WMD. But the intelligence and facts were being fixed around the policy. The NSC had no patience with the UN route, and no enthusiasm for publishing material on the Iraqi regime's record. There was little discussion in Washington of the aftermath after military action.

bolstering the assertions of opponents of Bush and Blair that the invasion had been decided a priori, the intelligence to support the invasion had been slanted towards that purpose, and that there had been insufficient planning for the aftermath. This was even more explicitly stated elsewhere in the memo,

The Foreign Secretary said he would discuss this with Colin Powell this week. It seemed clear that Bush had made up his mind to take military action, even if the timing was not yet decided. But the case was thin. Saddam was not threatening his neighbours, and his WMD capability was less than that of Libya, North Korea or Iran.

=== Permanent Secretary at DFID and Home Office ===
Rycroft was appointed Permanent Secretary at the Department for International Development with effect from January 2018. Rycroft replaced Mark Lowcock who ran the department from 2011. He was appointed Permanent Under-Secretary of State of the Home Office in March 2020 following the resignation of Sir Philip Rutnam.

He has been considered as a future potential ambassador to the United States and National Security Adviser.

In February 2025 Rycroft announced he was retiring as Permanent Under-Secretary of State at the Home Office.

== Honours ==
Rycroft was appointed a Commander of the Order of the British Empire in 2003 and a Knight Commander of the Order of St Michael and St George (KCMG) in the 2023 New Year Honours for services to British diplomacy, development, and domestic policy.

Diplomatic posts
Preceded by Francis Campbell	Private Secretary for Foreign Affairs to the Prime Minister; 2002–2004	Succeeded by Antony Phillipson
Preceded by Ian Cliff	Ambassador to Bosnia and Herzegovina; 2005–2008	Succeeded by Michael Tatham
Preceded by Sir Mark Lyall-Grant	Permanent Representative to the United Nations; 2015–2018	Succeeded by Karen Pierce
Preceded by (Ukraine) Volodymyr Yelchenko	President of the United Nations Security Council; March 2017	Succeeded by (United States) Nikki Haley
Government offices
Preceded by Mark Lowcock	Permanent Secretary at the Department for International Development; 2018–2020	Succeeded by Department abolished
Preceded by Sir Philip Rutnam	Permanent Secretary of the Home Office; 2020–2025	Succeeded by Dame Antonia Romeo
