= Basil Boothby =

British ambassador (1910–1990)

Basil Boothby CMG (9 September 1910 – 9 February 1990) was a British ambassador.

== Early life and education ==
Evelyn Basil Boothby was the only son (with two sisters) of Major Basil Tanfield Beridge Boothby (1873-1948), of the Royal Engineers, FRGS, MICE, and Katherine Georgina, daughter of Major Francis Blake Knox, of the Royal Artillery. He was a great-great-grandson of Sir William Boothby, 7th Baronet; his Boothby grandfather and great-grandfather were clergymen. He was educated at Winchester College and Corpus Christi College, Cambridge (BA).

== Career ==
Boothby joined the Diplomatic Service in 1933 as a student interpreter in the China Consular Service, and continued to work in China until 1945 except for brief interludes in the United States and India during World War II. After the war he was appointed vice-consul in Athens where he met Susan Asquith, granddaughter of H. H. Asquith: they married in 1946. Later he was Counsellor in Rangoon 1951–54, acting as chargé d'affaires between ambassadors. He was Counsellor in the British Embassy in Brussels 1954–59, Head of the African Department at the Foreign Office 1959–62, Ambassador to Iceland 1962–65 and Permanent Representative to the Council of Europe 1965–69. After retiring from the Diplomatic Service he taught at Morley College and later at the Department of Extra-Mural Studies, University of London.

"Basil Boothby was a diplomat more successful in giving foreigners a good impression of Britain than in giving his superiors a good impression of himself. Had it been the other way round, he would almost certainly have risen higher than he did." — The Times, London, 22 February 1990, page 16

Diplomatic posts
Preceded by Charles Stewart	Ambassador to Iceland; 1962–1965	Succeeded by Aubrey Halford-MacLeod
Preceded by Ivor Porter	Permanent Representative to the Council of Europe; 1965–1969	Succeeded by John Robey
