= List of high commissioners of the United Kingdom to Tonga =

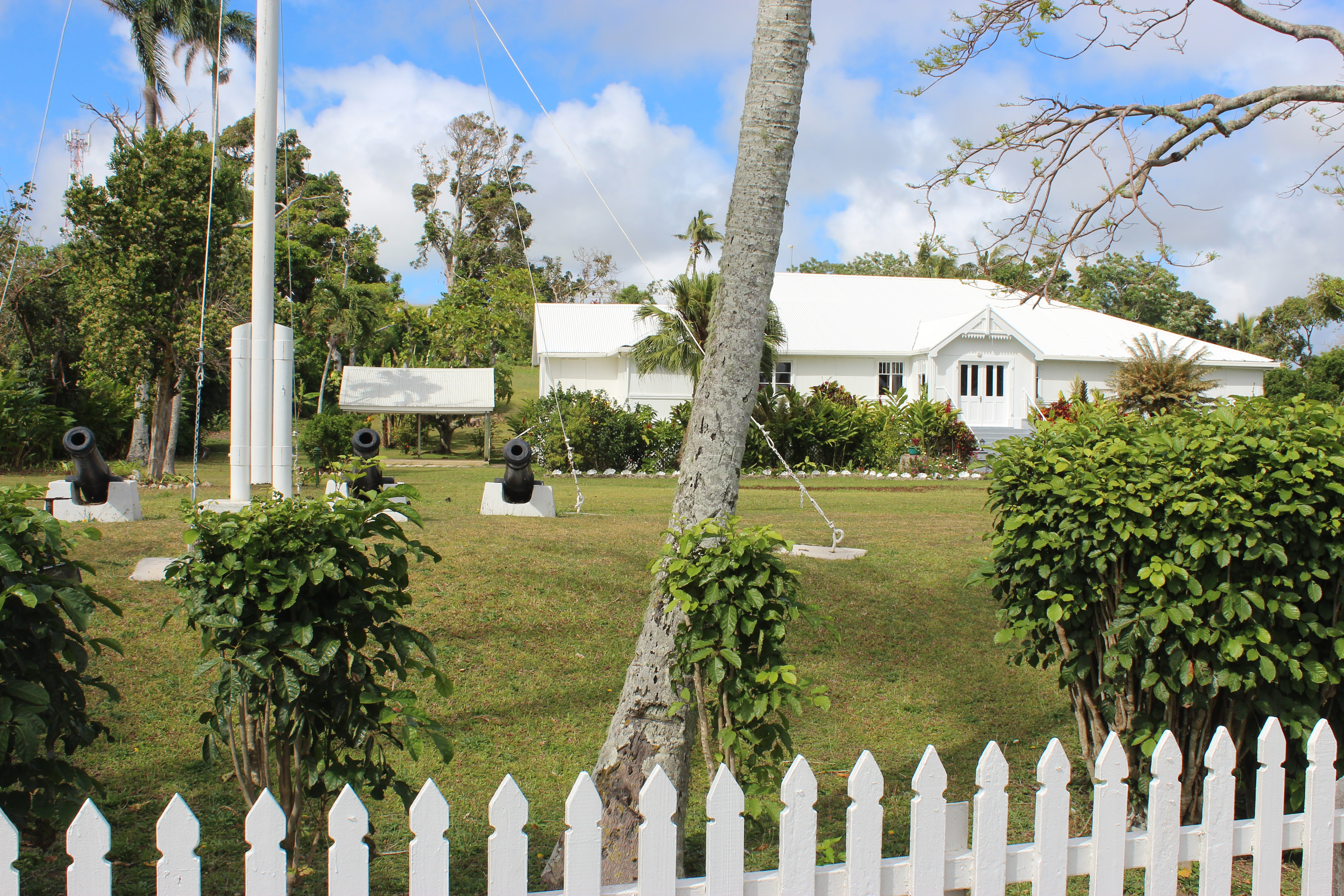
The British high commissioner's residence, Nukuʻalofa

The high commissioner of the United Kingdom to Tonga is the United Kingdom's diplomatic representative to the Kingdom of Tonga

High commissioners were resident from 1973 until March 2006, when the British government closed its commission in Nukuʻalofa; British interests in Tonga were then represented by the British high commissioner in Fiji. A resident high commissioner was reinstated in 2019.

== List of heads of mission ==
=== High commissioners to Tonga ===
- 1973–1980: Humphrey Arthington-Davy
- 1980–1983: Bernard Coleman
- 1984–1987: Gerald Rance
- 1987–1990: Paul Fabian
- 1990–1994: William Cordiner
- 1994–1998: Andrew Morris
- 1999–2001: Brian Connelly
- 2002–2006: Paul Nessling
- 2019–2020: Robin Ord-Smith
- 2020: Thorhilda Abbott-Watt
- 2020–2024: Lucy Joyce
- 2024–2026: Philip Malone
- 2026–present: Keith McMahon

== See also ==
- List of British consuls in Tonga
