= List of ambassadors of the United Kingdom to Georgia =

British Ambassador to Georgia ბრიტანეთის ელჩი საქართველოში
- Royal arms of His Majesty's Government
- Incumbent; Gareth Ward since August 2024
- Foreign, Commonwealth and Development Office; British Embassy, Tbilisi
- Style: His Excellency
- Member of: Investors Council (Non-Permanent)
- Reports to: Foreign Secretary
- Seat: Tbilisi, Georgia
- Appointer: The Crown on advice of the prime minister
- Term length: At His Majesty's pleasure
- Inaugural holder: Stephen Nash; First ambassador to Georgia
- Formation: 1995
- Website: www.gov.uk/world/georgia

The British ambassador to Georgia is the United Kingdom's foremost diplomatic representative in Georgia, and head of the UK's diplomatic mission in Tbilisi. The official title is His Britannic Majesty's Ambassador to Georgia.

After the collapse of the Soviet Union, the United Kingdom renewed diplomatic relations with Georgia and the then British ambassador to Russia, Sir Brian Fall, was also accredited to Georgia until the new embassy in Tbilisi was opened in 1995.

== Heads of mission ==
=== Chief British commissioners of Transcaucasus ===
- 1919–1920: Sir Oliver Wardrop
- 1920–1921: Claude Stokes

=== Ambassadors ===
- 1995–1998: Stephen Nash
- 1998–2001: Richard Jenkins
- 2001–2004: Deborah Barnes-Jones
- 2004–2007: Donald MacLaren
- 2007–2010: Denis Keefe
- 2010–2013: Judith Gough
- 2013: David Moran Chargé d'affaires with personal rank of ambassador
- 2013–2016: Alexandra Hall Hall
- 2016–2020: Justin McKenzie Smith
- 2020–2024: Mark Clayton
- 2024–present: Gareth Ward
