= List of high commissioners of the United Kingdom to Vanuatu =

The high commissioner of the United Kingdom to Vanuatu is the United Kingdom's diplomatic representative to the Republic of Vanuatu.

As Vanuatu and the United Kingdom are fellow members of the Commonwealth of Nations, diplomatic relations between them are at government level rather than between heads of state. Thus, the countries exchange high commissioners rather than ambassadors.

== History ==
In 2005 the British Government closed its high commission in Port Vila. During this time British interests in Vanuatu were represented by the British high commissioner to Solomon Islands who was also accredited as high commissioner to Vanuatu. The British high commission in Port Vila reopened in summer 2019 with a resident high commissioner.

== List of heads of mission ==
=== High commissioners to Vanuatu ===
- 1980–1982: William Ashford
- 1982–1985: Richard Dorman
- 1985–1988: Malcolm Lars Creek LVO OBE
- 1988–1992: John Thompson
- 1992–1995: Thomas Duggin
- 1995–1997: James Daly
- 1997–2000: Malcolm Geoffrey Hilson OBE
- 2000–2005: Michael Hill
- 2006–2009: Roger Sykes (non-resident)
- 2009–2011: Malcolm McLachlan (non-resident)
- 2011–2012: Timothy Smart (acting, non-resident)
- 2012–2013: Martin Fidler (acting, non-resident)
- 2013–2016: Dominic Meiklejohn (non-resident)
- 2016–2019: David Ward (non-resident)
- 2019–2022: Karen Bell
- 2022–present: Nicolette Brent
