= Samantha Job =

British civil servant

Her Excellency Samantha Job CMG MVO
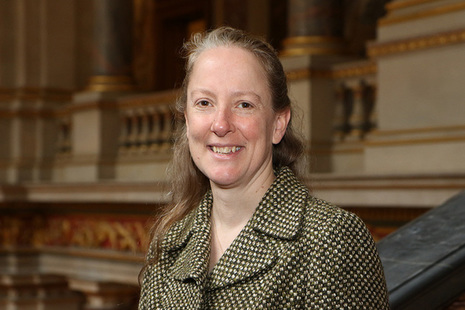
- Official photograph, 2019

British Ambassador to Sweden
- Incumbent
- Assumed office August 2024
- Monarch: Charles III
- Prime Minister: Keir Starmer
- Preceded by: Judith Gough

Personal details
- Born: 22 August 1971 (age 55)
- Children: 2
- Education: Christ Church, Oxford

Samantha Louise Job CMG MVO is a British civil servant at the Foreign, Commonwealth and Development Office. She is the current UK Ambassador to Sweden. She was appointed to the Order of St Michael and St George in the 2022 New Year Honours.

== Early life and education ==
Born in 1971, Job has said that she wanted to enter diplomatic service from the age of 14. Her mother and father had served in the Royal Air Force, and she was interested in a career that tried to stop wars. She was an undergraduate student in History at the University of Oxford. She was based at Christ Church, and matriculated in 1988.

== Career ==
In 1992, Job started work in the Foreign, Commonwealth and Development Office (FCO). She originally worked as an officer, focussing on geographic issues in Southeast Asia and the Middle East. She covered issues such as nuclear proliferation, international security and the Iran nuclear deal. Job was posted to New York City to work at the United Kingdom Mission to the United Nations, and later to Washington at the rank of Counsellor.

During her early career, Job experienced sexism, being told by the Ambassador to Tunis that her career would “never last ... it's no career for a woman,”. In 2013 she was appointed Head of the North Africa Department at the FCO. Three years into her role she appointed the first woman Ambassador to Tunis.

Job is on the advisory board of Women In International Security UK. She was appointed Companion of the Order of St Michael and St George (CMG) in the 2022 New Year Honours for services to British foreign policy.

Job was appointed His Majesty’s Ambassador to the Kingdom of Sweden in August 2024. She presented her credentials to King Carl XVI Gustaf on 4 September 2024.

== Personal life ==
Job has two children.

Diplomatic posts
Preceded by Judith Gough	British Ambassador to Sweden; 2024-present	Incumbent
