= William Edmund O'Reilly =

British diplomat (1873–1934)

William Edmund O'Reilly (24 March 1873 – 23 August 1934) was a British diplomat.

== Professional career ==
He was appointed a third secretary in His Majesty's Diplomatic Service in August 1901, and a Second Secretary three months later in November 1901.

O′Reilly was Minister to Bolivia from 1919 to 1924, Minister to Guatemala 1924–1925, Envoy to Albania in 1926 and Minister to Venezuela from 1926 to 1932.
