= Roger Beetham =

British diplomat (1937–2009)

Roger Campbell Beetham CMG LVO (22 November 1937 – 19 September 2009) was a British diplomat

Beetham was educated at Peter Symonds College and Brasenose College, Oxford. He joined HM Diplomatic Service in 1960. He was Head of Chancery at the British Embassy in Helsinki from 1972, before being seconded to the European Commission in Brussels, where he served as spokesman for Roy Jenkins, who was then President of the Commission.

He then served consecutively as Counsellor (Economic and Commercial) in New Delhi (1981-1985); Head of Maritime, Aviation and Environment Department at the Foreign Office in London (1985-1990); Ambassador to Senegal (1990-1993); and finally Permanent Representative to the Council of Europe (1993-1997).

Diplomatic posts
Preceded by John Macrae	British Ambassador to Senegal; 1990-1993	Succeeded by Alan Furness
Preceded by Noël Marshall	Permanent Representative to the Council of Europe; 1993-1997	Succeeded by Andrew Carter

== Honours ==
- Companion of the Order of St Michael and St George (CMG) - 1993
- Lieutenant of the Royal Victorian Order (LVO) - 1976
