= Matt Field =

British diplomat

His Excellency Matt Field OBE
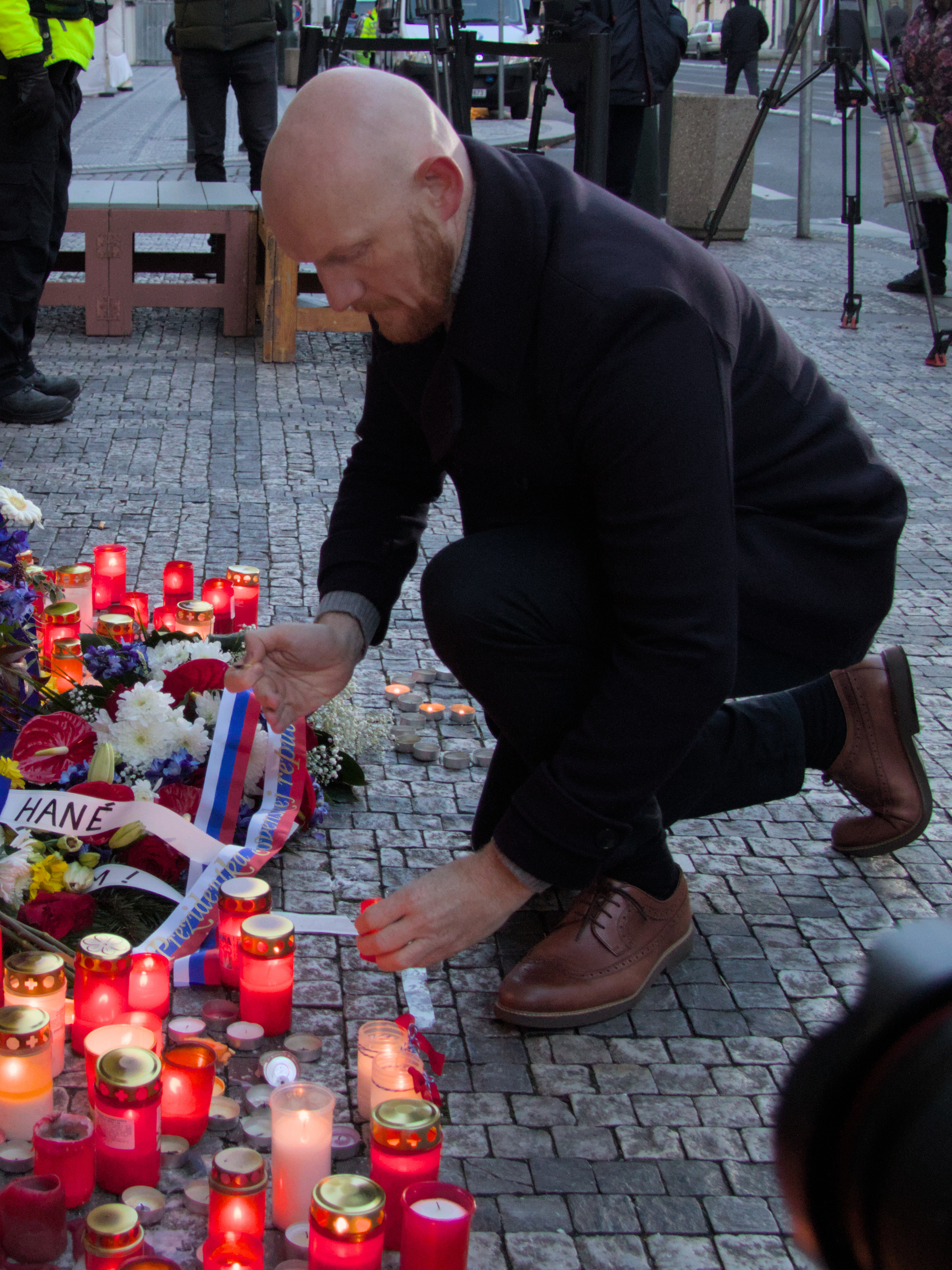
- Matt Field in 2023 during commemoration of the Velvet Revolution

British Ambassador to the Czech Republic
- Incumbent
- Assumed office 23 January 2023
- Monarch: Charles III
- Prime Minister: Rishi Sunak; Keir Starmer; Andy Burnham
- Preceded by: Nick Archer

British Ambassador to Bosnia and Herzegovina
- In office 2018–2022
- Monarch: Elizabeth II
- Prime Minister: Theresa May; Boris Johnson
- Preceded by: Edward Ferguson
- Succeeded by: Julian Reilly

Personal details
- Spouse: Martina Field
- Children: 2 sons
- Education: Durham University

Matthew Robert Field OBE is a British diplomat. He joined HM Diplomatic Service in 2003. Between August 2018 and June 2022, he served as the British Ambassador to Bosnia and Herzegovina. In January 2023 he took up the post of ambassador to the Czech Republic.

Field was appointed Officer of the Order of the British Empire (OBE) in the 2023 New Year Honours for services to British foreign policy.

Field graduated with a BA in Religious Studies, an MA in Japanese Studies, and an MA in Business Administration.

Diplomatic posts
Preceded by Nick Archer	British Ambassador to the Czech Republic; 2023–present	Succeeded by Incumbent
