= List of high commissioners of the United Kingdom to Gabon =

The high commissioner of the United Kingdom to the Gabonese Republic is the United Kingdom's foremost diplomatic representative, and head of the UK's diplomatic mission, in Gabon. As the United Kingdom and Gabon are fellow members of the Commonwealth of Nations, their diplomatic relations are at governmental level, rather than between heads of state. Thus, the countries exchange high commissioners, rather than ambassadors.

== List of high commissioners ==
The following persons have served as British high commissioner:

Before McPhail, Christian Dennys-McClure served as non-resident high commissioner, alongside being the resident British high commissioner to Cameroon

- 2023–2024: Jo McPhail
- 2024–present: Simon Day
