= Michael Tatham =

British diplomat

His Excellency Michael Tatham CMG
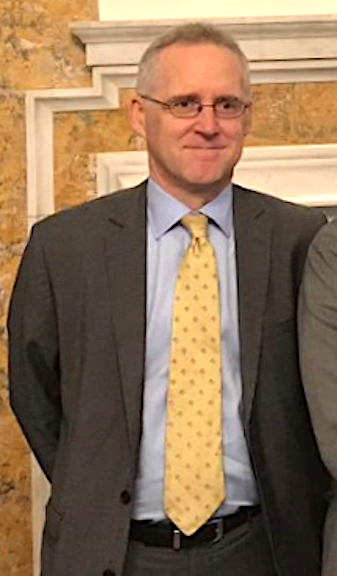
- Tatham in November 2018

British High Commissioner to Cyprus
- Incumbent
- Assumed office November 2024
- Monarch: Charles III
- Prime Minister: Keir Starmer
- Preceded by: Irfan Siddiq

Deputy British Ambassador to the United States
- In office January 2018 – July 2022
- Monarch: Elizabeth II
- President: Donald Trump; Joe Biden
- Prime Minister: Theresa May; Boris Johnson
- Preceded by: Patrick Davies
- Succeeded by: James Roscoe

British Chargé d'affaires ad interim to the United States
- In office 1 January 2020 – 22 March 2020
- Monarch: Elizabeth II
- President: Donald Trump
- Prime Minister: Boris Johnson
- Preceded by: Lord Darroch of Kew
- Succeeded by: Dame Karen Pierce

British Ambassador to Bosnia and Herzegovina
- In office 2008–2011
- Monarch: Elizabeth II
- Prime Minister: David Cameron; Gordon Brown
- Preceded by: Matthew Rycroft
- Succeeded by: Nigel Casey

Personal details
- Born: 2 July 1965 (age 60)
- Children: 1
- Relatives: David Tatham (father)

Michael Harry Tatham CMG (born 2 July 1965) is a British diplomat who has served as British High Commissioner to Cyprus since November 2024.

== Early life ==
Michael Harry Tatham was born on 2 July 1965, the son of fellow diplomat David Tatham.

== Career ==
Tatham joined HMDS and the FCO in the 1980s. In his early career, he served in Prague and Sofia; he also served in ministerial private office for Jeremy Hanley from 1995 to 1996, and for Prime Minister Tony Blair (under the Private Secretary for Foreign Affairs to the Prime Minister, first John Sawers and then Francis Campbell) from 1999 until 2002.

Tatham returned to Prague as Deputy Head of Mission from 2002 to 2005, then served as Head of the FCO's Western Balkans Group before serving as British Ambassador to Bosnia and Herzegovina from 2008 to 2011. After four years as political counsellor at UKMIS in New York, he became the Foreign Office's Director for Eastern Europe and Central Asia from 2015 to 2017.

From January 2018 to July 2022, Tatham served as the Deputy British Ambassador to the United States. Following the resignation of Kim Darroch in July 2019, he became interim chargé d'affaires. He was appointed Companion of the Order of St Michael and St George (CMG) in the 2020 Birthday Honours for services to British foreign policy.

In November 2024, Tatham began his tenure as British High Commissioner to Cyprus.

== Personal life ==
Tatham is married and has one daughter. He enjoys travelling, skiing, theatre, and cooking. He is a fan of Bob Dylan, the New York Mets, and craft beer.

Government offices
Preceded by Judith Gough	Director, Eastern Europe and Central Asia, Foreign & Commonwealth Office; 2015–2017	Succeeded by Martin Harris
Diplomatic posts
Preceded by Matthew Rycroft	British Ambassador to Bosnia and Herzegovina; 2008–2011	Succeeded by Nigel Casey
