= Nigel Casey =

British diplomat

His Excellency Nigel Casey CMG MVO
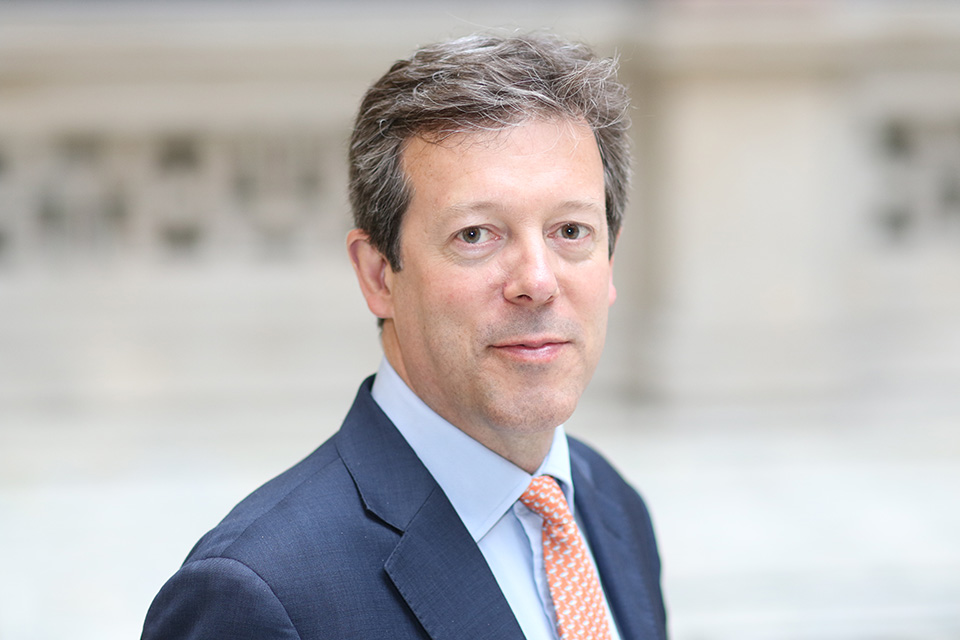

British Ambassador to Russia
- Incumbent
- Assumed office November 2023
- Monarch: Charles III
- Prime Minister: Rishi Sunak; Keir Starmer; Andy Burnham
- Preceded by: Dame Deborah Bronnert

British High Commissioner to South Africa
- In office April 2017 – April 2021
- Monarch: Elizabeth II
- Preceded by: Dame Judith Macgregor
- Succeeded by: Antony Phillipson

British Ambassador to Bosnia and Herzegovina
- In office September 2011 – 2013
- Monarch: Elizabeth II
- Preceded by: Michael Tatham
- Succeeded by: Edward Ferguson

Personal details
- Born: 29 May 1969 (age 57) Leamington Spa, Warwickshire, England
- Education: Balliol College, Oxford

Nigel Philip Casey CMG MVO (born 29 May 1969) is a British diplomat, who has been His Majesty's Ambassador to the Russian Federation since November 2023.

He served as the British Ambassador to Bosnia and Herzegovina from September 2011 until 2013, and then as the British High Commissioner to South Africa from April 2017 until April 2021. From May 2021 to 2023, Casey was concurrently the Foreign Office's Director for Afghanistan and the Prime Minister's Special Representative for Afghanistan and Pakistan.

== Early life ==
Nigel Philip Casey was born on 29 May 1969 in Leamington Spa, Warwickshire to Michael Casey and Josephine Casey.

Casey was educated at Rockport School, an independent school in Holywood, County Down, and at Blundell's School, an independent school in Tiverton, Devon. From 1987 to 1990, he studied modern history at Balliol College, Oxford, graduating with a Bachelor of Arts (BA) degree.

== Career ==
Casey is a career diplomat who has worked for the Foreign and Commonwealth Office since 1991. His career to date has been divided between the FCDO in London and six overseas postings. In addition to Sarajevo, he has been posted in Pretoria, Washington D.C., Moscow and New Delhi.

Casey was appointed the British Ambassador to Bosnia and Herzegovina in September 2011. Casey left this appointment in 2014.

Casey worked as the Private Secretary to the Prime Minister for Foreign Affairs from 2014 to 2016., serving Prime Ministers David Cameron and Theresa May.

Casey was appointed the British High Commissioner to South Africa in April 2017. In August 2019, Casey said that Brexit would present opportunities for South Africa, and that he was confident South Africa would be on the list of post-Brexit business partners. Casey left this appointment in April 2021.

Casey was appointed to the Prime Minister's Special Representative for Afghanistan in May 2021 and Director for Afghanistan and Pakistan in the FCDO.

On 2 August 2023, he was announced as the next British Ambassador to Russia, in succession to Dame Deborah Bronnert. He took up the appointment in November 2023. President Vladimir Putin received his letter of credence during a ceremony at the Grand Kremlin Palace on 4 December 2023.

In September 2026, Russia’s Federal Security Service (FSB) reported that it had detained a security officer working at the British Embassy. The FSB alleged that he had been recruited by the Security Service of Ukraine to gather information in preparation for an attack on Nigel Casey and other diplomats. The detained man was only identified as Marat.

== Personal life ==
Casey married Clare Crocker in 2002. They have two children, a son and a daughter.

== Honours ==
On 21 March 1995, Casey was appointed a Member of the Royal Victorian Order (MVO). In the 2017 New Year Honours, he was appointed a Companion of the Order of St Michael and St George (CMG) "for services to British foreign policy".

Casey was granted the Freedom of the City of London in May 2018.

== See also ==
- South Africa–United Kingdom relations
