= List of diplomats of the United Kingdom to ASEAN =

The head of the UK delegation to ASEAN is the senior member of the United Kingdom's delegation to ASEAN, based in Jakarta. The head of the delegation usually holds the personal rank of ambassador. The role, starting in 2009, was initially undertaken by the British Ambassador to Indonesia, but since 2019 has been held individually.

== Heads of delegation ==
- 2009–2011: Martin Hatfull (jointly as British ambassador to Jakarta)
- 2011–2014: Mark Canning (jointly as British ambassador to Jakarta)
- 2014–2019: Moazzam Malik (jointly as British ambassador to Jakarta)
- 2019–2023: Jon Lambe
- 2023–2025: Sarah Tiffin
- 2025–present: Helen Fazey
