= List of ambassadors of the United Kingdom to Eritrea =

The ambassador of the United Kingdom to Eritrea is the United Kingdom's foremost diplomatic representative in the State of Eritrea, and head of the UK's diplomatic mission in Asmara. The official title is His Britannic Majesty's Ambassador to the State of Eritrea.

From Eritrean independence in 1993 until March 2002 the British ambassador to Ethiopia, resident in Addis Ababa, was also accredited to Eritrea.

The current ambassador is Alisdair Walker.

== List of heads of mission ==
=== Ambassadors to Eritrea ===
- 1997–2000: Gordon Wetherell
- 2000–2002: Myles Wickstead
- 2002–2006: Michael Murray
- 2006–2008: Nick Astbury
- 2008–2010: Andrea Reidy
- 2010–2012: Sandra Tyler-Haywood
- 2012–2014: Amanda Tanfield
- 2014–2016: David Ward
- 2016–2019: Ian Richards
- 2019–2024: Alisdair Walker
- 2024–present: David McIlroy
