= John Macrae (diplomat) =

British diplomat (1932–2025)

John Esmond Campbell Macrae CMG (8 December 1932 – 31 August 2025) was a British diplomat.

== Life and career ==
Macrae was born on 8 December 1932. He was schooled at the Sheikh Bagh preparatory in Kashmir and Fettes College, and completed his university education at Christ Church, Oxford. He earned a DPhil in Radiation Chemistry from Oxford in 1960 and, before joining HM Diplomatic Service, began his career in the Atomic Energy and Disarmament Department of the Foreign Office.

He was Head of Cultural Relations at the Foreign Office (1980–1985); Ambassador to Senegal (1985–1990); and finally Ambassador to Morocco (1990–1992).

Macrae died on 31 August 2025, at the age of 92.

Diplomatic posts
Preceded by Laurence O'Keeffe	British Ambassador to Senegal; 1985-1990	Succeeded by Roger Beetham
Preceded by John Shakespeare	British Ambassador to Morocco; 1990-1992	Succeeded by Allan Ramsay

== Honours ==
- Companion of the Order of St Michael and St George (CMG) - 1986
