= List of high commissioners of the United Kingdom to the Solomon Islands =

British High Commissioner to Solomon Islands
- Coat of arms of the United Kingdom
- Incumbent; Paul Turner since January 2025
- Style: His Excellency
- Residence: Honiara
- Appointer: The monarch; on advice of the prime minister
- Formation: 1978
- Website: High Commission – Solomon Islands

The high commissioner of the United Kingdom to Solomon Islands is the United Kingdom's foremost diplomatic representative to Solomon Islands, and in charge of the UK's diplomatic mission in Solomon Islands.

The current British high commissioner to Solomon Islands also is employed as the high commissioner to the Republic of Nauru.

== High commissioners to the Solomon Islands ==
- 1978–82 Gordon Slater
- 1982–86 George Norman Stansfield
- 1986–88 John Noss
- 1988–90 Junor Young
- 1990–95 Raymond Jones
- 1996–98 Brian Connelly
- 1998–2001 Alan Waters
- 2001–04 Brian Baldwin
- 2004–08 Richard Lyne
- 2008–11 Timothy Smart
- 2012–16 Dominic Meiklejohn, also non-resident British high commissioner to Vanuatu and Nauru
- 2016–2019 David Ward, also non-resident British high commissioner to Vanuatu and Nauru
- 2019–2021: Brian Jones, also non-resident British high commissioner to Nauru
- 2021-24: Tom Coward, also non-resident British high commissioner to Nauru
- 2025 - present: Paul Turner, also non-resident British high commissioner to Nauru
