= List of permanent representatives of the United Kingdom to the Conference on Disarmament =

The permanent representative of the United Kingdom to the United Nations Conference on Disarmament is the United Kingdom's foremost diplomatic representative to the Conference on Disarmament in Geneva. Permanent representatives normally hold the personal rank of ambassador.

The Conference on Disarmament was formally established in 1979; this list includes chief diplomats to the preceding Eighteen-Nation Committee on Disarmament (1962–68) and Conference of the Committee on Disarmament (1969–78). In the early years of the Eighteen-Nation Committee the UK delegation was led by the minister of state for foreign affairs, Joseph Godber (later Lord Godber of Willington) with a diplomat, Sir Paul Mason, as resident alternate.

== List of permanent representatives ==
- 1962–1964: Sir Paul Mason (Alternate Delegate to Minister of State)
- 1964–1967: Harold Beeley (UK Representative)
- 1967–1971: Ivor Porter (Minister 1967–68, then ambassador)
- 1971–1974: Henry Hainworth
- 1974–1977: Mark Allen
- 1977–1979: Derick Ashe
- 1979–1982: David Summerhayes
- 1982–1987: Ian Cromartie
- 1987–1992: Tessa Solesby
- 1992–1997: Sir Michael Weston
- 1997–2001: Ian Soutar
- 2001–2004: David Broucher
- 2004–2006: John Freeman
- 2006–2011: John Duncan
- 2011–2013: Joanne Adamson
- 2013–2018: Matthew Rowland
- 2018–2024: Aidan Liddle
- 2024–present: David Riley
