= List of ambassadors of the United Kingdom to Mali =

The ambassador of the United Kingdom to Mali is the head of the United Kingdom's diplomatic mission in the Republic of Mali.

== History ==
Mali gained independence from France in 1960. British ambassadors have been resident in Mali only from 1961 until 1965 and since 2012; from 1969 to 2012 the ambassador to Senegal was also accredited to Mali.

The British ambassador to Mali was also accredited to the Republic of Niger until 2020 when a resident Ambassador in Niger was established.

== Ambassadors ==
- 1961–1964: Martin Le Quesne
- 1964–1965: John Waterfield
- 1965–1969: Diplomatic relations severed
- 1969–2012: Combined with Senegal, see List of ambassadors of the United Kingdom to Senegal
- 2012–2014: Philip Boyle
- 2014–2016: Joanne Adamson
- 2016–2018: Alice Walpole
- 2018–2020: Catherine "Cat" Evans
- 2020–2021: Guy Warrington
- 2021–2023: Barry Lowen
- 2023–2025: Katy Ransome
- 2025–present: Angus McKee
