= List of permanent representatives of the United Kingdom to the Council of Europe =

The permanent representative to the Council of Europe is the senior member of the United Kingdom's delegation to the Council of Europe, based in Strasbourg.

The permanent representative has the personal rank of ambassador.

== Permanent representatives ==
- 1951–1952: Cyril Wakefield-Harrey
- 1952–1955: Peter Scarlett
- 1955–1959: Gerald Meade
- 1959–1962: John Peck
- 1962–1965: Ivor Porter
- 1965–1969: Basil Boothby
- 1969–1974: John Robey
- 1974–1978: Peter Foster
- 1978–1983: Donald Cape
- 1983–1986: Christopher Lush
- 1986–1990: Colin McLean
- 1990–1993: Noël Marshall
- 1993–1997: Roger Beetham
- 1997–2003: Andrew Carter
- 2003–2007: Stephen Howarth
- 2007–2012: Eleanor Fuller
- 2012–2016: Matthew Johnson
- 2016–2020: Christopher Yvon
- 2020–2021: Neil Holland
- 2021–present: Sandy Moss
