= List of ambassadors of the United Kingdom to Bosnia and Herzegovina =

The ambassador of the United Kingdom to Bosnia and Herzegovina is the United Kingdom's foremost diplomatic representative in Bosnia and Herzegovina, and head of the UK's diplomatic mission in Sarajevo. The official title is His Britannic Majesty's Ambassador to Bosnia and Herzegovina.

== List of heads of mission ==
=== Ambassadors to Bosnia and Herzegovina ===
- 1992–1994: Robert Barnett
- 1994–1996: Bryan Hopkinson
- 1996–1998: Charles Crawford
- 1998–2001: Graham Hand
- 2001–2005: Ian Cliff
- 2005–2008: Matthew Rycroft
- 2008–2011: Michael Tatham
- 2011–2014: Nigel Casey
- 2014–2018: Edward Ferguson
- 2018–2022: Matthew Field
- 2022–present: Julian Reilly
