= List of ambassadors of the United Kingdom to North Macedonia =

The ambassador of the United Kingdom to North Macedonia is the United Kingdom's foremost diplomatic representative in the Republic of North Macedonia, and head of the UK's diplomatic mission in Skopje.

The Republic of Macedonia, as it was then called, declared independence from the former Yugoslavia in 1991 but, due to a dispute over the country's name, member countries of the EC, including the UK, did not formally recognise the new country until 16 December 1993. The British embassy in Skopje was opened on that day. The naming dispute was resolved in February 2019 when the country became the Republic of North Macedonia.

== Ambassadors ==
- 1993–1997: Tony Millson
- 1997–2001: Mark Dickinson
- 2001–2004: George Edgar
- 2004–2007: Robert Chatterton Dickson
- 2007–2010: Andrew Key
- 2010–2014: Christopher Yvon
- 2014–2018: Charles Garrett
- 2018-2022; Rachel Galloway
- 2022-current; Matthew Lawson
