= List of ambassadors of the United Kingdom to Kyrgyzstan =

The ambassador of the United Kingdom to Kyrgyzstan is the United Kingdom's foremost diplomatic representative in the Kyrgyz Republic, and head of the UK's diplomatic mission in Bishkek. The official title is His Britannic Majesty's Ambassador to the Kyrgyz Republic.

From the break-up of the Soviet Union in December 1991 until 2012 the ambassador to Kazakhstan also served concurrently as the non-resident ambassador to Kyrgyzstan. A new British Embassy was opened in Bishkek in December 2011 and the first resident ambassador took up her post formally in 2012 when Ambassador Farnworth presented credentials to President Atambayev.

== Ambassadors ==
- 2012–2015: Judith Farnworth
- 2015–2019: Robin Ord-Smith
- 2019–2022: Charles Garrett
- 2023–present: Nicholas Bowler
