= Robin Ord-Smith =

British diplomat (1965–2022)

Robin Ord-Smith MVO
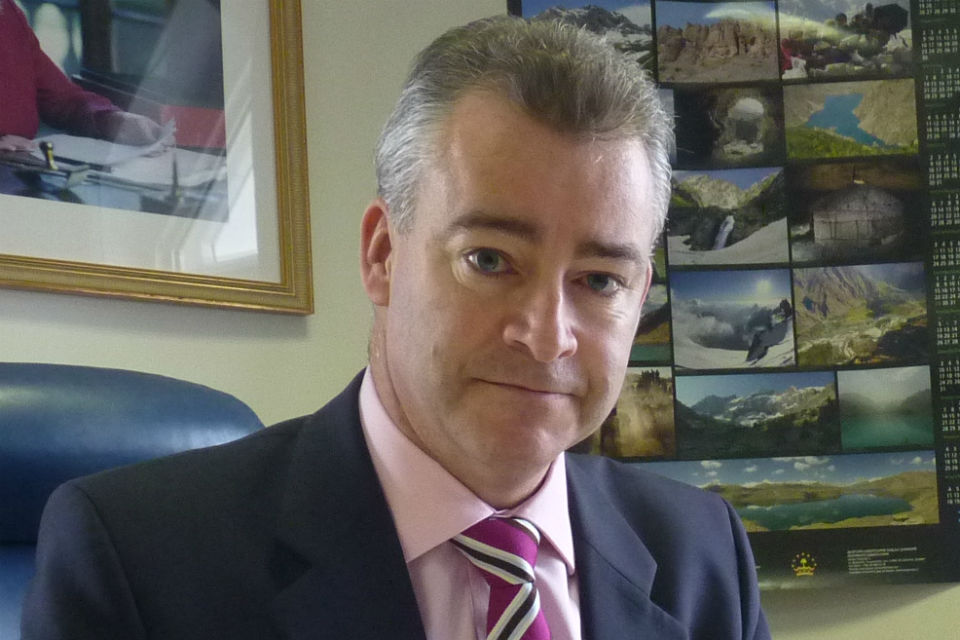

British Ambassador to Kyrgyzstan
- In office June 2015 – January 2019
- Monarch: Elizabeth II
- Prime Minister: David Cameron; Theresa May
- Preceded by: Judith Farnworth
- Succeeded by: Charles Garrett

Personal details
- Born: 8 October 1965
- Died: 20 September 2022 (aged 56)
- Education: University of Surrey (BSc)

Robin Jeremy Ord-Smith MVO (8 October 1965 – 20 September 2022) was a British diplomat.

He was educated at Ferndown Upper School and the University of Surrey (BSc). He joined the Foreign and Commonwealth Office in 1985, and was British Ambassador to Tajikistan 2012–2014, then British Ambassador to Kyrgyzstan 2015–2019. He then became the Business Ombudsman of the Kyrgyz Republic.
