= Stephen Nash (diplomat) =

British diplomat

Stephen Thomas Nash CMG (born 1942) is a British diplomat. He was Chargé d'Affaires to Albania from 1993 to 1995, Ambassador to Georgia from 1995 to 1998, Ambassador to Albania from 1998 to 1999, and Ambassador to Latvia from 1999 to 2002.

He was appointed a Companion of the Order of St Michael and St George in the 2000 New Year Honours.
