= List of high commissioners of the United Kingdom to Rwanda =

The high commissioner of the United Kingdom to the Republic of Rwanda is the United Kingdom's foremost diplomatic representative in Rwanda.

The British Embassy in Kigali opened in 1995. On Rwanda's accession to the Commonwealth in 2009, the embassy became the British high commission and the ambassador became the high commissioner. The high commission is located in the Kacyiru area of Kigali, immediately opposite the Laico Umubano Hotel.

The British high commissioner to Rwanda is also non-resident ambassador to the Republic of Burundi, with a liaison office in Bujumbura.

== List of heads of mission ==
=== Ambassadors ===
- 1996–1998: Kaye Oliver
- 1998–2001: Graeme Loten
- 2001–2004: Sue Hogwood
- 2004–2008: Jeremy Macadie
- 2008–2009: Nicholas Cannon

=== High commissioners ===
- 2009–2011: Nicholas Cannon
- 2011–2014: Benedict Llewellyn-Jones
- 2014–2017: William Gelling
- 2018-2021: Joanne Lomas
- 2021-2024: Omar Daair
- 2024-present: Alison Thorpe
