= List of ambassadors of the United Kingdom to Montenegro =

The ambassador of the United Kingdom to Montenegro is the United Kingdom's foremost diplomatic representative in Montenegro and head of the United Kingdom's diplomatic mission in Podgorica.

The principality (and later Kingdom) of Montenegro was independent from 1878 to 1918, during which there was a British minister resident at Cetinje, the royal capital.

Following the breakup of Yugoslavia in 1991, the republics of Serbia and Montenegro together established a federation as the Federal Republic of Yugoslavia (FRY). In 2003 the FRY was reconstituted as a state union officially known as the State Union of Serbia and Montenegro. The British ambassador to Serbia was also accredited to Montenegro. The union was dissolved in June 2006 when Serbia and Montenegro declared themselves independent countries, and a British embassy was then established in Podgorica.

== Ministers resident ==
- 1893–1906: Mr Robert John Kennedy, CMG

== Ambassadors ==
- 2006–2007: Mr John Dyson MVO
- 2007–2009: Mr Kevin Lyne
- 2009–2013: Ms Catherine (Kate) Knight-Sands
- 2013–2017: Mr Ian Whitting OBE
- 2017–2020: Ms Alison Kemp
- 2020–2023: Ms Karen Maddocks
- 2023–: Ms Dawn McKen
