= List of ambassadors of the United Kingdom to Turkmenistan =

The ambassador of the United Kingdom to Turkmenistan is the United Kingdom's foremost diplomatic representative in the Republic of Turkmenistan, and head of the UK's diplomatic mission there. The official title is His Britannic Majesty's Ambassador to the Republic of Turkmenistan.

After the collapse of the Soviet Union, the United Kingdom recognised the independence of Turkmenistan in December 1991. Diplomatic relations were established in January 1992 and the then British ambassador to Russia, Sir Brian Fall, was also accredited to Turkmenistan until the new embassy in Ashgabat was opened in 1995.

== List of heads of mission ==
=== Ambassadors ===
- 1995–1998: Neil Hook
- 1998–2002: Fraser Wilson
- 2002–2005: Paul Brummell
- 2005–2010: Peter Butcher
- 2010–2013: Keith Allan
- 2013–2016: Sanjay Wadvani
- 2016–2019: Thorhilda Abbott-Watt
- 2019–2021: Hugh Philpott
- 2022–2023: Lucia Wilde
- 2023-present: Stephen Conlon
