= Fionna Gibb =

British diplomat

Fionna Gibb is a British diplomat. She joined the Foreign and Commonwealth Office (FCO) in 1990 and served as Her Majesty’s Ambassador to the Republic of Belarus from 2016 until 2019. She was Deputy Consul-General in Basra from 2008-2009 and was Deputy Head of Mission in Sanaa from 2010-2012. In 2010, Gibb survived an assassination attempt that was suspected to have been by terrorist group al-Qaeda.

In 2019, she was thanked by the President of the House of Representatives in Belarus for her efforts in developing the countries' relations.

== Rainbow flag at Embassy controversy ==
When the UK Ministry flew the rainbow flag in honor of the International Day Against Homophobia, Transphobia and Biphobia in May 2018, the Belarusian Ministry expressed its displeasure. The Belarusian Ministry's official release stated:

Not taking into account traditions and pillars of the society, supporters of same-sex relationships are fiercely defending their position. By any measure, same-sex relationships are fake. And the essence of fakes is always the same, i.e the depreciation of the truth. The LGBT community, the struggle for ‘their rights’, and the LGBT day itself are nothing but a fake! Belarus rests on the foundation of traditional institutions of family and marriage. At the same time, we are equally open to all that is useful, necessary and progressive: for all that will make the lives of Belarusians better and contribute to the development of society as a whole. We are for true-life things, and they [LGBT] shall not pass!

In a video posted on Facebook in 2019, Gibb said the flag will be flying again:

“This embassy is once again flying the rainbow flag as we did in 2015, 2017 and 2018. We do so not to promote LGBT, but to promote equal rights for this community. LGBT people are not asking for special rights, but simply to enjoy the same respect, dignity and rights as others. As human rights are universal and should apply equally to all people, my government is committed to non-discrimination on any grounds, including sexual orientation and gender identity. Nevertheless, discrimination still continues in UK against this community as it does all over the world including in Belarus. Flying a flag raises awareness about discrimination, and many people don’t even realize that they hold such discriminatory views.”
