= List of ambassadors of the United Kingdom to Moldova =

The ambassador of the United Kingdom to Moldova is the United Kingdom's foremost diplomatic representative in the Republic of Moldova, and head of the UK's diplomatic mission in Chișinău. The official title is His Britannic Majesty's Ambassador to the Republic of Moldova.

After the dissolution of the Soviet Union in December 1991, Moldova was formally recognised as an independent state by the United Nations in March 1992. A new British ambassador to Russia, Brian Fall, was appointed at that time and he was also accredited to nine former Soviet republics including Moldova. Fall's successor in Moscow, Andrew Wood, was accredited to Moldova until 1999 when Richard Ralph was appointed ambassador for Romania and also to Moldova. Bernard Whiteside was appointed the first resident ambassador in 2002.

== List of heads of mission ==
=== Ambassadors to Moldova ===
- 1992–1995: Sir Brian Fall (non-resident)
- 1995–1999: Sir Andrew Wood (non-resident)
- 1999–2002: Richard Ralph (non-resident)
- 2002–2006: Bernard Whiteside
- 2006–2009: John Beyer
- 2009–2013: Keith Shannon
- 2013–2016: Philip Batson
- 2016–2019: Lucy Joyce
- 2019–2023: Steven Fisher
- 2023–present: Fern Horine
