= List of high commissioners of the United Kingdom to Mauritius =

The high commissioner of the United Kingdom to Mauritius is the United Kingdom's foremost diplomatic representative to the Republic of Mauritius, and head of the UK's diplomatic mission in Mauritius.

The high commissioner to Mauritius is also non-resident ambassador to the Union of the Comoros.

== List of heads of mission ==
=== High commissioners to Mauritius ===
- 1968–1970: Arthur Wooller
- 1970–1973: Peter Carter
- 1973–1977: Henry Brind
- 1977–1981: Alec Ward
- 1981–1985: James Allan
- 1986–1989: Richard Crowson
- 1989–1993: Michael Howell
- 1993–1997: John Harrison
- 1997–2000: James Daly
- 2001–2004: David Snoxell
- 2004–2007: Anthony Godson
- 2007–2010: John Murton
- 2010–2014: Nicholas Leake
- 2014–2017: Jonathan Drew
- 2017–2021: Keith Allan
- 2021–2025: Charlotte Pierre
- 2025–present: Paul Brummell
