= List of high commissioners of the United Kingdom to Papua New Guinea =

The high commissioner of the United Kingdom to Papua New Guinea is the United Kingdom's foremost diplomatic representative in the Independent State of Papua New Guinea.

Papua New Guinea gained independence (from Australia) in 1975. The new state chose to be a member of the Commonwealth of Nations, so the UK's diplomatic representative is a high commissioner rather than an ambassador.

== List of heads of mission ==
=== High commissioners ===
- 1975–1977: George Baker
- 1977–1982: Donald Middleton
- 1982–1986: Arthur Collins
- 1986–1989: Michael Howell
- 1989–1991: John Sharland
- 1991–1994: John Guy
- 1994–1997: Brian Low
- 1997–2000: Charles Drace-Francis
- 2000–2003: Simon Scaddan
- 2003–2007: David Gordon-Macleod
- 2007–2010: David Dunn
- 2010–2014: Jackie Barson
- 2014–2018: Simon Tonge
- 2018–present: Keith Scott
