= List of ambassadors of the United Kingdom to Senegal =

The ambassador of the United Kingdom to Senegal is the United Kingdom's foremost diplomatic representative in the Republic of Senegal.

Senegal was under French influence in the 19th century, and from 1895 was included in the colonial federation of French West Africa. The early representatives of the UK government were unpaid Frenchmen; the first British official arrived in 1894. Senegal gained independence from France in 1960.

== List of heads of mission ==
=== Vice-consuls at Dakar ===
- 1872–1879: Cléomenes Pillot
- 1879–1887: Ernest Simon Montoux
- 1887–1888: Edouard Rastoul
- 1888–1894: Pierre Gaston Faoche
- 1894–1896: Allan Maclean

=== Consuls at Dakar ===
- 1896–1897: Allan Maclean
- 1897–1902: Leonard Arthur
- 1902–1905: Charles Cromie, for French West Africa and for Republic of Liberia

=== Consuls-general at Dakar for French West Africa ===
- 1905–1908: Charles Cromie
- 1908–1909: John Baldwin, for French West Africa except Dahomey, also for Togoland and Portuguese Guinea
- 1909–1916: Charles Wallis, ditto
- 1916–1928: Reginald Maugham (acting 1916–20), also for Portuguese Guinea
- 1928–1931: Eric Buxton, ditto
- 1931–1940: Victor Cusden, ditto
- July 1940–Jan 1943: Post closed (Vichy administration in Dakar)
- 1943–1945: William Meiklereid
- 1945–1951: Hector Henderson
- 1951–1954: Donal Cameron
- 1954–1956: Frank Butler
- 1956–1959: Alan Oldham
- 1959–1960: Adam Watson, also for Portuguese Guinea

=== Ambassadors extraordinary and plenipotentiary to the Republic of Senegal ===
- 1960–1962: Adam Watson, also to Mali, Mauritania, Togo
- 1962–1966: John Peck, also to Mauritania
- 1966–1971: John Tahourdin, also to Mauritania, Mali, Guinea
- 1971–1973: Ivor Porter, ditto
- 1973–1976: Denzil Dunnett, ditto
- 1976–1979: John Powell-Jones, also to Mali, Mauritania, Guinea, Cape Verde, Guinea-Bissau
- 1979–1982: William Squire, ditto
- 1982–1985: Laurence O'Keeffe, ditto
- 1985–1990: John Macrae, ditto
- 1990–1993: Roger Beetham, also to Mali, Guinea, Cape Verde, Guinea-Bissau
- 1993–1997: Alan Furness, ditto
- 1997–2000: David Snoxell, ditto
- 2000–2004: Edward Alan Burner, also to Mali, Guinea-Bissau, Cape Verde
- 2004–2006: Peter Newall, ditto
- 2007–2011: Christopher Trott, ditto
- 2011–2015: John Marshall, also Guinea-Bissau, Cape Verde
- 2015–2019: George Hodgson, also Guinea-Bissau, Cape Verde
- 2019–2022: Victoria Billing, also Guinea-Bissau, Cape Verde
- 2022–2025: Juliette John, also Guinea-Bissau, Cape Verde
- 2025–present: Carine Robarts, also Guinea-Bissau, Cape Verde
