= Justin McKenzie Smith =

British diplomat

His Majesty's Ambassador to Hungary
- Appointed by: King Charles III
- Monarch: King Charles III
- Prime Minister: Andy Burnham MP
- Preceded by: Paul Fox

Justin McKenzie Smith is a British diplomat currently serving as His Majesty's ambassador to Hungary since October 2025.

Prior to his current appointment, Smith was UK ambassador to Georgia and Deputy Head of Mission at the British Embassy in Mexico City.
