= List of high commissioners of the United Kingdom to Namibia =

The high commissioner of the United Kingdom to Namibia is the United Kingdom's foremost diplomatic representative in the Republic of Namibia, and head of the UK's diplomatic mission in Windhoek.

As fellow members of the Commonwealth of Nations, diplomatic relations between the United Kingdom and Namibia are at governmental level, rather than between heads of state. Thus, the countries exchange high commissioners, rather than ambassadors.

== High commissioners to Namibia ==
- 1990–1992: Sir Francis Richards
- 1992–1996: Henry Hogger
- 1996–1998: Glyn Davies
- 1999–2002: Brian Donaldson
- 2002–2007: Alasdair MacDermott
- 2007–2011: Mark Bensberg
- 2011–2015: Marianne Young
- 2015–2017: Joanne Lomas
- 2018–2021: Kate Airey
- 2021–2025: Charles Moore
- 2025-present: Neil Bradley
