= List of ambassadors of the United Kingdom to Belarus =

The ambassador of the United Kingdom to Belarus is the United Kingdom's foremost diplomatic representative in the Republic of Belarus, and head of the UK's diplomatic mission in Minsk. The official title is His Britannic Majesty's Ambassador to the Republic of Belarus.

== History ==
Until 1991 Belarus was within the Soviet Union. When Belarus became independent at the end of 1991, the British ambassador to Russia was accredited also to Belarus until May 1993 when an office was opened in Minsk, within the German embassy, and for over a year the British Embassy worked out of a single, cramped room with its locally engaged support staff working off a desk lodged beneath the staircase. In July 1995 new premises were opened in a former geological laboratory, and are now shared between the British and Italian missions. Some staff, such as the Defence Attaché, are still based in Moscow.

On 10 October 2020, the United Kingdom temporarily recalled its ambassador from Belarus amidst the 2020 Belarusian protests.

The mandate of the British ambassador to Belarus, Jacqueline Perkins, expired in August 2024. However, the UK Government decided not to appoint a new ambassador, but instead to send a chargé d'affaires to Minsk.

== List of heads of mission ==
=== Ambassadors to Belarus ===
- 1992–1993: Sir Brian Fall (ambassador to Russia, accredited to Belarus)
- 1993–1996: John Everard
- 1996–1999: Jessica Pearce
- 1999–2003: Iain Kelly
- 2003–2007: Brian Bennett
- 2007–2008: Michael Haddock
- 2008–2009: Nigel Gould-Davies
- 2009–2012: Rosemary Thomas
- 2012–2016: Bruce Bucknell
- 2016–2019 Fionna Gibb
- 2019–2024: Jacqueline Perkins

=== Chargé d'affaires to Belarus ===
- 2024–present: David Ward (ad interim)
