= List of high commissioners of the United Kingdom to Fiji =

The high commissioner of the United Kingdom to Fiji is the United Kingdom's foremost diplomatic representative in the Republic of Fiji.

Fiji gained independence from the United Kingdom in 1970. As fellow members of the Commonwealth of Nations, the United Kingdom and Fiji conduct their diplomatic relations at governmental level, rather than between heads of state. Therefore, the countries exchange high commissioners, rather than ambassadors.

British high commissioners to Fiji (or, from 1988 to 1997, British ambassadors to Fiji) have also acted at various times as ambassadors or high commissioners to the Republic of Kiribati, the Republic of the Marshall Islands, the Federated States of Micronesia, the Republic of Nauru, the Kingdom of Tonga, Tuvalu and the Republic of Vanuatu.

== List of heads of mission ==
=== High commissioners to the Dominion of Fiji ===
- 1970–1974: John Robert Williams
- 1974–1978: James Stanley Arthur
- 1978–1982: John Morrison, 2nd Viscount Dunrossil, also to Nauru, Tuvalu
- 1982–1987: Roger Barltrop, also to Nauru, Tuvalu

=== Ambassadors extraordinary and plenipotentiary to the Sovereign Democratic Republic of Fiji ===
On 1 October 1987 Fiji was deemed to have left the Commonwealth and the British High Commission became the British Embassy.

- 1988–1989: Roger Barltrop, also High Commissioner to Nauru, Tuvalu
- 1989–1992: Peter Smart, also High Commissioner to Nauru, Tuvalu
- 1992–1995: Timothy David, also High Commissioner to Kiribati, Nauru, Tuvalu
- 1995–1997: Michael Peart, also High Commissioner to Kiribati, Nauru, Tuvalu

=== High commissioners to the Republic of Fiji ===
On 1 October 1997 Fiji returned to its membership of the Commonwealth and the British Embassy once again became the British High Commission.

- 1997: Michael Peart, also to Kiribati, Nauru, Tuvalu
- 1997–2000: Michael Dibben, also to Kiribati, Nauru, Tuvalu
- 2000–2002: Michael Anthony Price, also to Kiribati, Nauru, Tuvalu
- 2002–2006: Charles Mochan, also to Kiribati, Nauru, Tuvalu
- 2006–2009: Roger Sykes, also to Kiribati, Nauru, Tonga, Tuvalu, Vanuatu
- 2009–2011: Malcolm McLachlan, also to Kiribati, Nauru, Tonga, Tuvalu, Vanuatu
- 2011–2012: Timothy Smart (acting), also to Kiribati, Nauru, Tonga, Tuvalu, Vanuatu
- 2012–2013: Martin Fidler (acting), also to Kiribati, Nauru, Tonga, Tuvalu, Vanuatu
- 2013: Steven Chandler (acting), also to Kiribati, Nauru, Tonga, Tuvalu
- 2013–2016: Roderick Drummond, also to Kiribati, Micronesia, Marshall Islands, Tonga, Tuvalu
- 2016–2020: Melanie Hopkins, also to Kiribati, Micronesia, Marshall Islands, Tonga, Tuvalu
- 2020–2022: George Edgar, also to Kiribati, Micronesia, Marshall Islands, Tuvalu
- 2022–2025: Brian Jones, also to Micronesia, Marshall Islands, Tuvalu
- 2025–present: Kanbar Hossein-Bor, also to Micronesia, Marshall Islands, Tuvalu
