= Embassy of the United Kingdom, Manila =

British Embassy, Manila
- Location: Taguig, Metro Manila
- Address: 120 Upper McKinley Road, Pinagsama, 1634 Taguig, Metro Manila
- Coordinates: 14°32′26″N 121°3′14″E
- Ambassador: Sarah Hulton
- Jurisdiction: Philippines; Palau
- Website: Embassy website

The British Embassy, Manila (Filipino: Embahada ng Britanya sa Maynila) is the chief diplomatic mission of the United Kingdom in the Philippines, with the Ambassador of the United Kingdom to the Philippines being the chief of mission. The embassy compound measures about 12,000 m^{2}, located at 120 Upper McKinley Road, Taguig, Metro Manila, near the Manila American Cemetery.

== History ==
=== Leandro V. Locsin Building (1989–2008) ===
During the coup attempt against President Cory Aquino, the Locsin Building, which housed the embassy and various companies, became a hiding place for the 40 members of the Reform the Armed Forces Movement. During their time hiding at the building, the hiding RAM rebels later smashed the embassy's office windows.

On 12 September 2002, the British embassy, along with the other offices housed in the building, were briefly evacuated after a company employee received a call that they were going to bomb the embassy. After the evacuation, the bomb squad of the Philippine National Police led by SPO1 Eduardo Ugaddan conducted their search for the bomb, and at 10:15 am, they discovered that there were no planted bombs at the building.

=== New chancery in Taguig, Metro Manila (2008–present) ===
In June 2006, the British embassy announced that they would build their new chancery in Taguig after Megaworld Corporation agreed to sell the 1.2 hectares of their 50-hectare land to them, which was later approved by the Philippine Department of Foreign Affairs. The groundbreaking began in March 2007, with the ceremony led by British ambassador Beckingham and Philippine officials including DFA secretary Alberto Romulo and Taguig mayor Sigfrido Tiñga.

On 12 July 2008, during the tenure of ambassador Peter Beckingham, the chancery in Taguig was inaugurated, and after almost 19 years in Locsin Building, the staff members were moved to the said building.

== See also ==
- Philippines–United Kingdom relations
- British School Manila
- List of ambassadors of the United Kingdom to the Philippines
- List of diplomatic missions of the United Kingdom
- List of diplomatic missions in the Philippines
- Embassy of the Philippines, London
