= Frank Gibbs =

British diplomat (1895–1983)

Sir Frank Stannard Gibbs CMG KBE
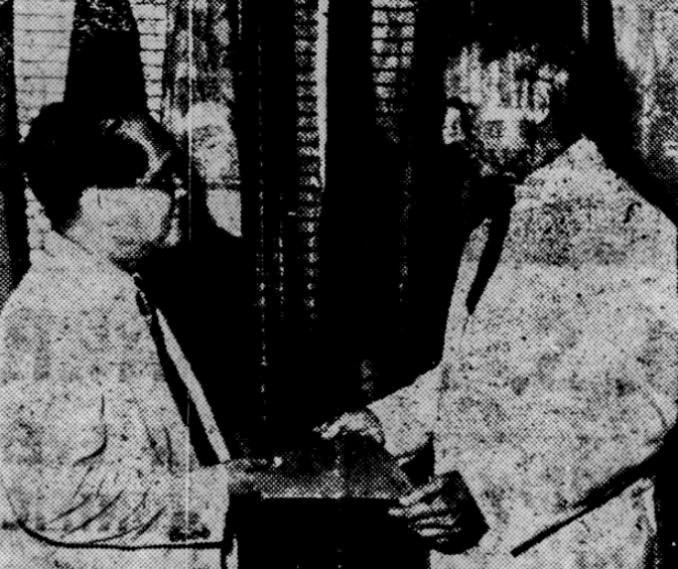
- Gibbs presenting the British Government's Instrument of Accession to the Pacific Charter to Foreign Minister of the Philippines, Carlos P. Garcia, on 9 November 1954.

British Ambassador to the Philippines
- In office 1954–1955
- Preceded by: Linton Foulds
- Succeeded by: Sir George Clutton

Personal details
- Born: 3 July 1895
- Died: 22 October 1983 (aged 88)
- Children: 2
- Occupation: Diplomat

Sir Frank Stannard Gibbs (3 July 1895 – 22 October 1983) was a British diplomat who served as British Ambassador to the Philippines from 1954 to 1955.

== Career ==
Gibbs joined the Foreign Service and began his career as vice-consul in Genoa in 1920. He then served in Madrid, Rio de Janeiro, Paris, Marseille, Beira, and Milan. In 1935, he joined the China consular service and was acting consul-general at Canton. In 1939, he was at Addis Ababa; in 1941 at Rosario; and in 1946, he was consul-general in Tunis.

Gibbs was consul-general for French Indochina at Saigon from 1947 to 1951. In 1950, when Britain recognised the Indochina associated states of Vietnam, Laos and Cambodia, he was elevated to the rank of minister to the three states. The raising of the consul-general to legation status was seen as confirming Britain's position in supporting the three states against the Communist backed Viet Minh insurrectionary government. On presenting his credentials to the Emperor, he praised Vietnam's progress towards independence and its support for economic co-operation with the Commonwealth.

In 1951, he was appointed minister in Manila, and in 1954 promoted to ambassador to the Philippines, a post he held until his retirement from the service in 1955.

== Personal life ==
Gibbs married Sylvia Knight in 1944 and they had one son and one daughter.

Gibbs died on 22 October 1983, aged 88.

== Honours ==
Gibbs was appointed Officer of the Order of the British Empire (OBE) in the 1939 Birthday Honours, and promoted to Knight Commander of the Order of the British Empire (KBE) in the 1954 New Year Honours. He was appointed Companion of the Order of St Michael and St George (CMG) in the 1949 Birthday Honours.

== See also ==
- Philippines–United Kingdom relations

Diplomatic posts
| Preceded by Linton Foulds | British Ambassador to the Philippines; 1954–1955 | Succeeded by Sir George Clutton |
