= John Curle =

British diplomat (1915–1997)

Sir John Curle KCVO CMG

British Ambassador to the Philippines
- In office 1970–1972
- Preceded by: Sir John Addis
- Succeeded by: James Turpin

British Ambassador to Liberia
- In office 1967–1970
- Preceded by: Malcolm Walker
- Succeeded by: Martin Moynihan

British Consul-General in Boston
- In office 1962–1966
- Preceded by: George Edmondson
- Succeeded by: Ralph Selby

Personal details
- Born: 12 December 1915 Brighton, Sussex
- Died: 30 September 1997 (aged 83)
- Children: 2
- Education: New College, Oxford
- Occupation: Diplomat

Sir John Noel Ormiston Curle (12 December 1915 – 30 September 1997) was a British diplomat who served as consul-general in Boston from 1962 to 1966, ambassador to Liberia from 1967 to 1970, and ambassador to the Philippines from 1970 to 1972.

== Early life and education ==
Curle was born on 12 December 1915 at Brighton, Sussex, the son of Major W. S. N. Curle, MC, of Melrose, Scotland. He was educated at Marlborough College and New College, Oxford, where he took a First in history. He then won the Laming travelling fellowship of Queen’s College, Oxford, and learnt French and German.

== Career ==
Curle joined the Diplomatic Service in 1939 but on the outbreak of the Second World War, he was commissioned into the Irish Guards, and from 1941 to 1944 was attached to the war cabinet secretariat, a uniformed post. He then served at Lisbon; Ottawa; Brussels; Stockholm from 1956 to 1958 as counsellor; and Athens from 1958 to 1962 as counsellor and head of chancery.

From 1962 to 1966, he served as consul-general at Boston. He then served as ambassador to Liberia from 1967 to 1970 while concurrently, non-resident ambassador to Guinea from 1968 to 1970, and then ambassador to the Philippines from 1970 to 1972.

In 1972, Curle was appointed vice-marshal of the Diplomatic Corps and head of protocol at the Foreign and Commonwealth Office. Described as a most suitable appointment, "he was the very model of a vice-marshal of the Diplomatic Corps. Tall, courageous and distinguished, he not only looked the part himself but made sure everyone else did." He held the post for three years until he retired in 1975.

After retiring from the Diplomatic Service, Curle worked as director of protocol in Hong Kong, remaining in the post from 1976 to 1985. In 1986, he was adviser for the coronation of the King of Swaziland.

== Personal life and death ==
Curle married first in 1940 to Diana Deane and they had a son and a daughter. After the marriage was dissolved, he married Pauline, widow of Captain David Roberts, in 1948. Curle was an accomplished skier. He won a Half-Blue; skied for the British Universities team, and trained with the British Olympic squad.

Curle died on 30 September 1997, aged 83.

== Honours ==
Curle was appointed Companion of the Order of St Michael and St George (CMG) in the 1966 New Year Honours. He was appointed Commander of the Royal Victorian Order (CVO) in 1956, and promoted to Knight Commander of the Royal Victorian Order (KCVO) in 1975.

== See also ==
- Liberia–United Kingdom relations
- Philippines–United Kingdom relations

Diplomatic posts
| Preceded by George Edmondson | British Consul-General in Boston; 1962–1966 | Succeeded by Ralph Selby |
| Preceded by Malcolm Walker | British Ambassador to Liberia; 1967–1970 | Succeeded by Martin Moynihan |
| Preceded by Sir John Addis | British Ambassador to the Philippines; 1970–1972 | Succeeded by James Turpin |
