= List of ambassadors of the United Kingdom to Poland =

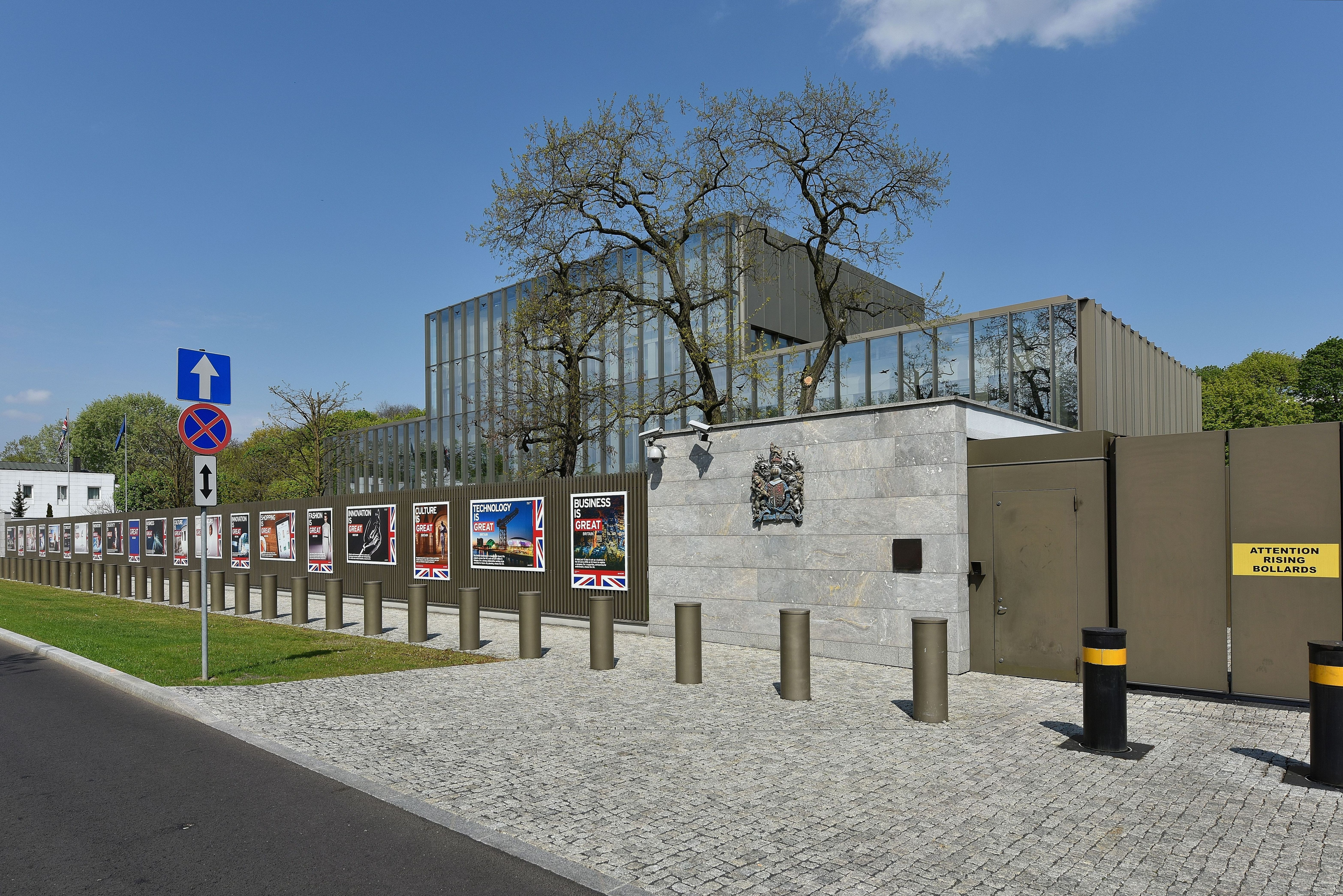
The British Embassy in Warsaw

The ambassador of the United Kingdom to Poland is the United Kingdom's foremost diplomatic representative in Poland, in charge of the UK's diplomatic mission. The official title is His Britannic Majesty's Ambassador to the Republic of Poland.

== List of heads of mission ==
=== Before partition ===
==== Agents ====
- 1604-1610: Dr William Bruce
  - 1609: James Sandilands, 2nd Baron Torphichen Special Ambassador
- 1610-1621: Patrick Gordon
- 1626-1641: Francis Gordon

Between 1641 and 1698, there seems to have been no continuous diplomatic representation

==== Envoys extraordinary and ministers plenipotentiary to the king of Poland ====
  - 1629-1630: Sir Thomas Roe Special Ambassador
- 1634-1636: Sir George Douglas
- 1669-1670: Sir Peter Wyche
- 1676-1678: Hon. Laurence Hyde

==== Envoys extraordinary to the king of Poland and elector of Saxony ====
From 1698 to 1763, successive electors of Saxony were usually kings of Poland. There was a single diplomatic mission to the king in both capacities.

  - 1698: George Stepney Special Mission
- 1700 on: Sir William Brown, 1st Baronet Resident
- 1702-1707: Dr John Robinson, Envoy Extraordinary to Sweden was resident in Danzig
- 1709-1710: John Dalrymple, 2nd Earl of Stair
  - 1710-1714: George Mackenzie (or Mackenzie-Quin) Chargé d'Affaires
- 1711: Charles Whitworth
  - 1711 and 1712: The Earl of Peterborough
- 1711-1715: James Scott
- 1715-1718: Sir Richard Vernon, 3rd Baronet
- 1718-1719: Lieut-Gen. Francis Palmes
  - 1719: Hugh Boscawen M.P. Special Mission, but did not go
- 1719-1722: James Scott (initially as Minister)
  - 1721-1725: Capt. James Jefferyes Resident at Danzig
  - 1724-1725: John Ernest von Wallenrodt Special Mission to Danzig

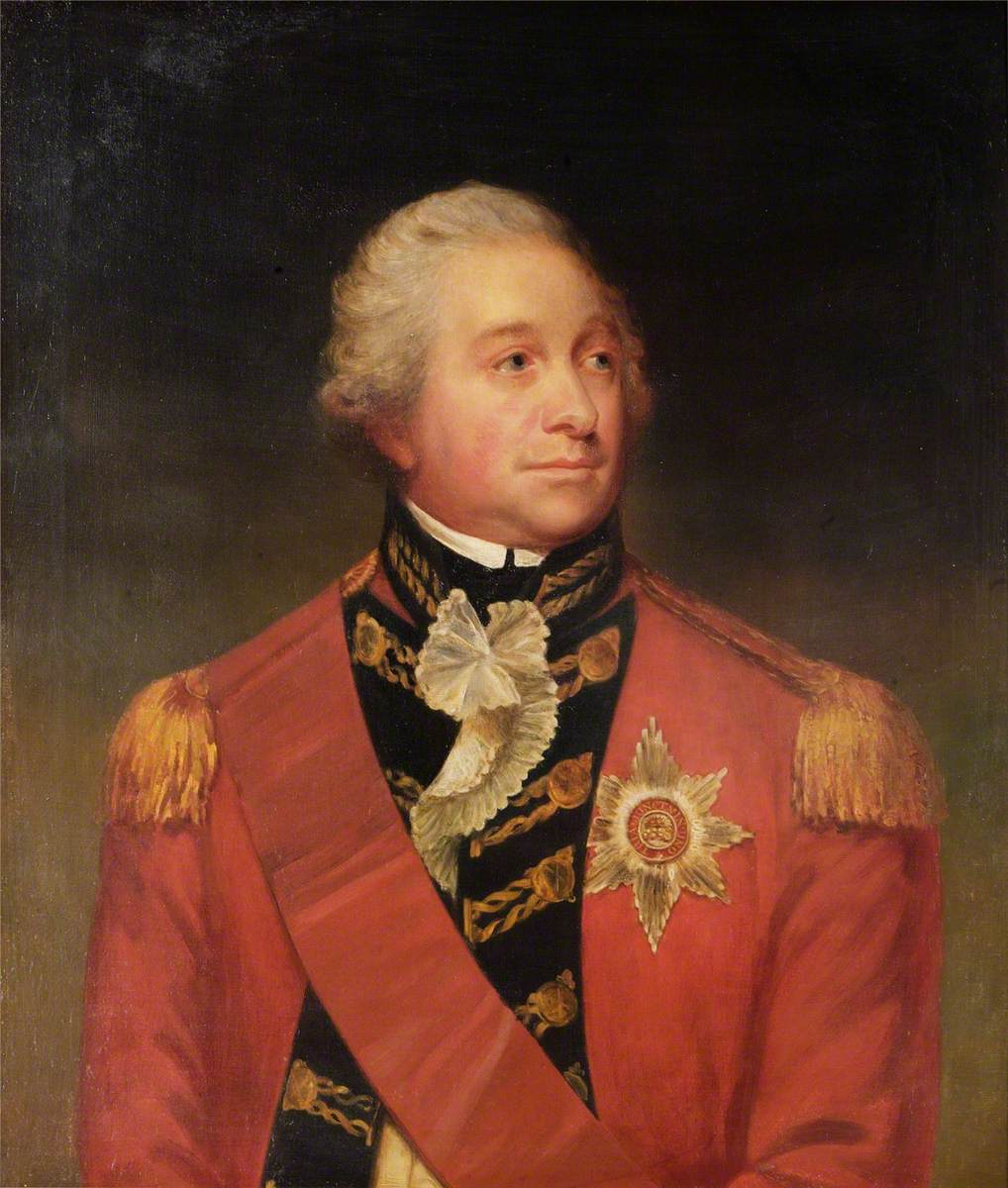
Charles Hanbury Williams

- 1725-1727: Edward Finch Minister Plenipotentiary
- 1728-1731: George Woodward Resident
  - 1730-1731: Sir Luke Schaub Special business
- 1732-1735: George Woodward
- 1735-1738: Denton Boate (Secretary) in charge
  - 1736-1737: Thomas Robinson At Dresden in 1737
- 1738-1746: Hon. Thomas Villiers
- 1747-1755: Charles Hanbury Williams
- 1756-1761: David Murray, 7th Viscount Stormont
  - 1761-1762: William Money in charge
- 1763-1778: Thomas Wroughton Resident 1762-1769 then Minister Plenipotentiary

==== Envoys extraordinary and ministers plenipotentiary to the king of Poland ====
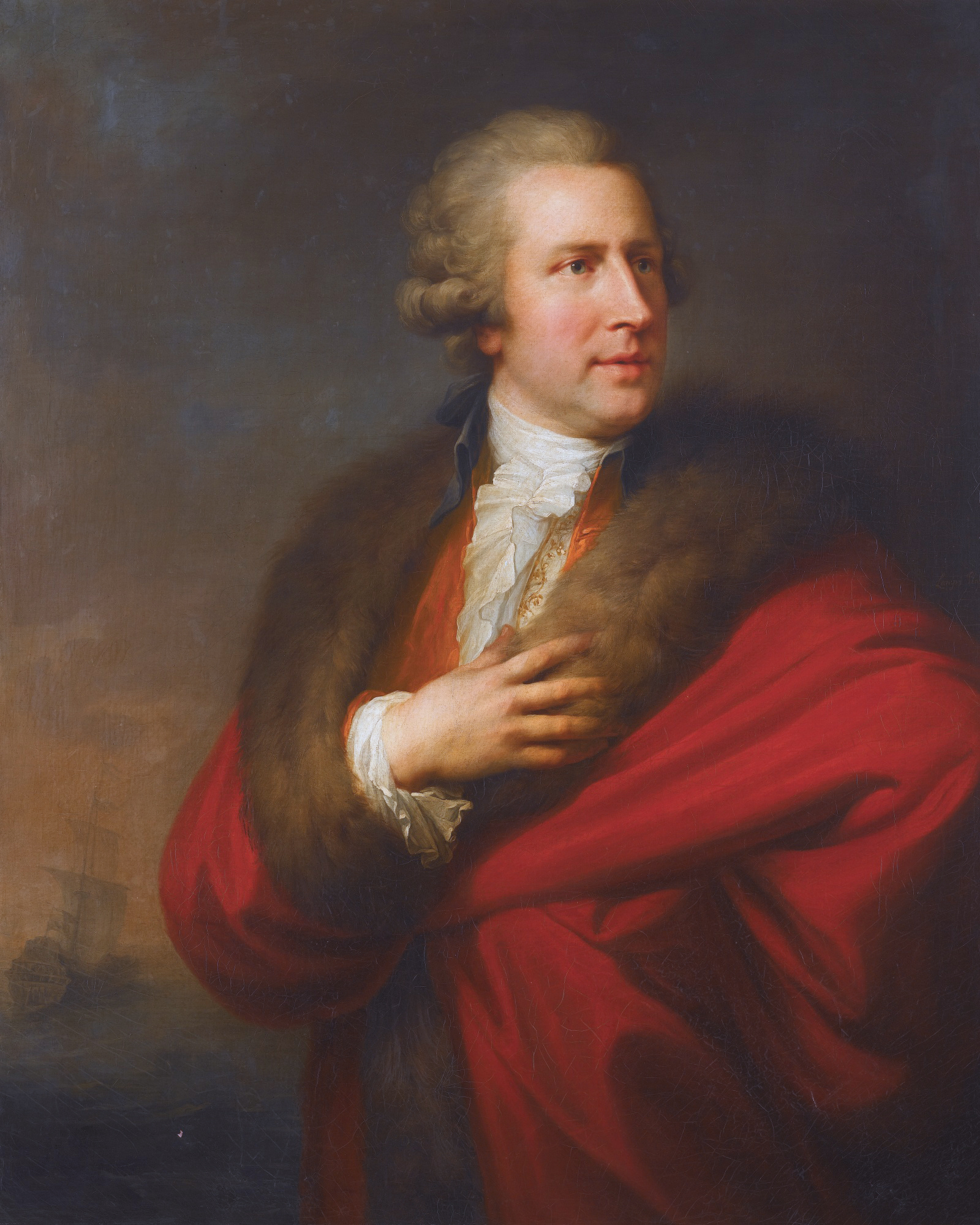
Charles Whitworth, 1st Earl Whitworth

- 1778-1779: Richard Oakes
- 1779-?: James Hare
- 1782-1784: Viscount Dalrymple
- 1785-1787: Charles Whitworth
- 1788-1791: Daniel Hailes
- 1791-1795: William Gardiner (remained at Warsaw until 1798)

In 1795, the remaining Polish territory was partitioned between Prussia, Austria, and Russia, so that there was not a state of Poland until after World War I.

=== After World War I ===
==== Envoys extraordinary and ministers plenipotentiary ====
- 1919–1920: Sir Horace Rumbold, Bt.
- 1920–1928: Sir William Max-Müller
- 1928–1929: Hon. Sir William Erskine

==== Ambassadors ====
- 1929–1934: Hon. Sir William Erskine
- 1935–1941: Sir Howard William Kennard
- 1941–1943: Cecil Francis Joseph Dormer
- 1943–1945: Sir Owen St. Clair O'Malley
- 1945–1947: Victor Cavendish-Bentinck
- 1947–1950: Donald St Clair Gainer
- 1950–1952: Sir Charles Bateman
- 1952–1954: Sir Francis Shepherd
- 1954–1956: Sir Andrew Noble, Bt.
- 1956–1960: Sir Eric Berthoud
- 1960–1966: Sir George Clutton
- 1966–1969: Sir Thomas Brimelow
- 1969–1972: Sir Nicholas Henderson
- 1972–1974: Frank Brenchley
- 1974–1978: Norman Reddaway
- 1978–1981: Kenneth Robert Comyn Pridham
- 1981–1983: Cynlais James
- 1983–1986: Sir John Morgan
- 1986–1988: Sir Brian Barder
- 1988–1991: Sir Stephen Barrett
- 1991–1996: Sir Michael Llewellyn-Smith
- 1996–1998: Sir Christopher Hum
- 1998–2001: John Malcolm Macgregor
- 2001–2003: Sir Michael Pakenham
- 2003–2007: Charles Crawford
- 2007–2011: Ric Todd
- 2011–2016: Robin Barnett
- 2016–2020: Jonathan Knott
- 2020–2025: Anna Clunes
- 2025–present: Melinda Simmons

== See also ==
- List of ambassadors of Poland to the United Kingdom
- Poland–United Kingdom relations
