= Alan Collins (diplomat) =

British diplomat (born 1948)

Sir Alan Collins KCVO, CMG
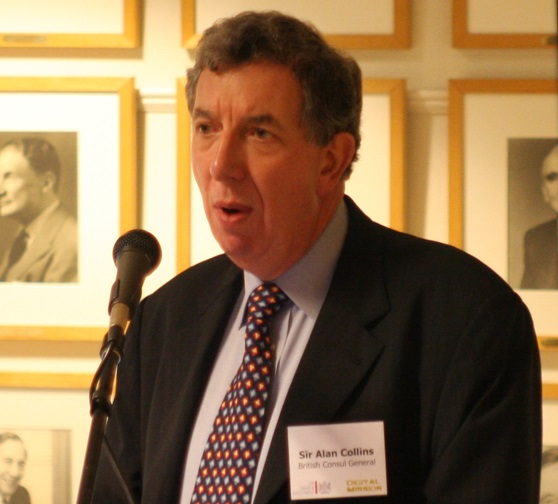

Her Majesty's Consul General in New York
- In office 2007–2011
- Monarch: Elizabeth II
- Preceded by: Philip L. Thomas
- Succeeded by: Danny Lopez

High Commissioner of the United Kingdom to Singapore
- In office 2003–2007
- Monarch: Elizabeth II
- Preceded by: Stephen Brown
- Succeeded by: Paul Madden

Ambassador of the United Kingdom to the Philippines
- In office 1998–2002
- Monarch: Elizabeth II
- Preceded by: Adrian Thorpe
- Succeeded by: Paul Dimond

Personal details
- Born: 1 April 1948 (age 78) London, United Kingdom
- Occupation: Diplomat

Sir Alan Stanley Collins, KCVO, CMG (Chinese: 柯安龍爵士; born 1 April 1948), is a retired British diplomat and former Consul General in New York City (2007–11), High Commissioner to Singapore (2003–07) and Ambassador to the Philippines (1998–2002).

Collins joined the Foreign and Commonwealth Office in 1981 as a Desk Office after working in the Ministry of Defence for around 11 years. He had served in a number of diplomatic positions in Ethiopia and the Philippines before he became Head of Aviation and Maritime Department in 1993. From 1995 to 1998, he was Director-General of the British Trade and Cultural Office in Taipei (predecessor of the British Office Taipei). Between 2002 and 2003, he was seconded to Royal Dutch Shell as vice-president for International Relations.

Collins took a keen interest in the welfare of children when he was Ambassador to the Philippines. As High Commissioner to Singapore, he took part in arranging Queen Elizabeth II's third state visit to that country in 2006, for which he was made a Knight Commander of the Royal Victorian Order. In Singapore, he also served in the delegation that won the 2012 Olympics for London. In 2011, he was further associated with the preparation of the Olympic Games when he was appointed managing director of Olympic Legacy under the UK Trade & Investment.

After retiring from the diplomatic service in 2011, Collins has held a number of directorships, including those of Prudential Assurance Singapore, ICICI Bank UK and JP Morgan American Investment Trust, etc. He has been a Trustee of Battersea Dogs & Cats Home since 2021.

== Biography ==
=== Early years ===
Collins was born in London, the United Kingdom, on 1 April 1948. He is the son of Stanley Arthur Collins and Rose Elizabeth Gimble. He was educated at Strand Grammar School before entering the London School of Economics, where he studied international relations and obtained a Bachelor of Science degree in economics. In 1970, he joined the Ministry of Defence (MoD), serving in junior positions including those related to personnel, resource management, defence policy and the North Atlantic Treaty Organization. Between 1973 and 1975, he was Private Secretary to the Vice Chief of the Air Staff.

=== Career diplomat ===
In 1981, Collins left the MoD to join the Foreign and Commonwealth Office (FCO). His first position was a Desk Officer for the Nordic countries in the Western European Department. Two years later, he became a Desk Officer for Iran and Iraq in the Middle East Department. Between 1986 and 1990, he was posted to the British Embassy in Addis Ababa, Ethiopia, where he worked as First Secretary, Head of Chancery and Deputy Head of Mission successively. In 1990, he was posted to the British Embassy in Manila, the Philippines, where he was Counsellor (Commercial) and Deputy Head of Mission. He returned to the United Kingdom as Head of Aviation and Maritime Department in 1993.

In 1995, Collins was selected, among a pool of five to six fellow diplomats, to succeed Philip Morrice, who was to become Consul General in Sydney, Australia, as Director-General of the British Trade and Cultural Office in Taipei, Taiwan (i.e. the Republic of China). Since Taiwan and the United Kingdom did not have formal diplomatic relations, the Office functioned as a de facto embassy to represent British interests in Taiwan. After he took office in August 1995, Collins proactively fostered economic and cultural ties between the two countries. During his tenure, United Kingdom-Taiwan bilateral trade reached 5 billion United States dollars (USD), in which US$2 billion was British investment in Taiwan, while the number of Taiwanese visiting the United Kingdom increased to 14,000. In recognition of his diplomatic work in Taiwan, he was appointed a Companion of the Order of St Michael and St George in the 1998 New Year Honours list.

From 1998 to 2002, Collins was appointed Ambassador to the Philippines, where he got involved in a number of livelihood projects and paid particular attention to children welfare. He worked with Save the Children, a United Kingdom-based non-governmental organisation, to provide medical services to children by setting up mobile clinics on the streets of the Malate district in Manila. He also assisted in organising training on handling child abuse cases for the Philippine National Police.

In 2002, Collins was seconded to Royal Dutch Shell as vice-president for International Relations, responsible for the company's global relationships with governments. Upon returning to the FCO in 2003, he was appointed High Commissioner to Singapore, where he took part in arranging Queen Elizabeth II's third state visit to Singapore in 2006. For that he was appointed a Knight Commander of the Royal Victorian Order. When he was in Singapore, he also served in the delegation that won the 2012 Olympics for London.

In September 2006, it was announced that Collins would take up the dual position of Consul General in New York and Director-General of Trade and Investment in the United States. Having assumed the dual capacity in January 2007, he oversaw a team of 250 staff members in the United States and in London and he was responsible for strengthening bilateral relationships between the United Kingdom and New York City, promoting British export interests in the United States and attracting high-value inward investment to the United Kingdom. In 2009, he also supported Prince Harry's official visit to New York City.

In New York, Collins continued to be associated with the preparatory work of the 2012 Olympic Games. In 2011, he was appointed the Senior Responsible Officer of the London Olympics 2012 Co-ordination Unit to oversee the FCO's contribution to the Games. He was also managing director of Olympic Legacy under the UK Trade & Investment (UKTI) to take in charge of the strategic direction of London 2012 work in the FCO and the UKTI. Collins retired from the FCO in 2011 after serving four years as Consul General in New York, but he continued to hold the offices related to the Olympic Games until 2012.

=== Post-FCO career ===
After retiring from the FCO, Collins has held a number of directorships. He was a non-executive director of Prudential Assurance Singapore, ICICI Bank UK and JP Morgan American Investment Trust, as well as a director of Prudential Hong Kong and a member of the Asia Advisory Board of St James's Place. Collins joined Battersea Dogs & Cats Home as a Trustee in March 2021. He sits on the Board of Trustees, the Global Programmes Committee, the Governance and Nominations Committee and chairs the Global Programmes Advancement Board.

== Personal life ==
Collins was married to Ann Dorothy Roberts in 1971. The couple have one daughter and two sons. Their daughter was born in 1985 and their two sons were born in 1988 and 1995 respectively. Collins is a member of Marylebone Cricket Club, the Kennel Club, and the Royal Commonwealth Society. He is a Life Patron of the British Theatre Playhouse, a Singaporean theatre and live entertainment company.

== Honours ==
- Companion of the Order of St Michael and St George (New Year Honours List 1998)
- Knight Commander of the Royal Victorian Order (13 March 2006)
- Freeman of the City of London

== Footnotes ==
Diplomatic posts
Preceded by John Hughes	Head of Aviation and Maritime Department, Foreign and Commonwealth Office; 1993–1995	Succeeded by Robin Kealy
Preceded by Philip Morrice	Director-General of the British Trade and Cultural Office, Taipei; 1995–1998	Succeeded by David Coates
Preceded by Adrian Thorpe	Ambassador of the United Kingdom to the Philippines; 1998–2002	Succeeded by Paul Dimond
Preceded by Stephen Brown	High Commissioner of the United Kingdom to Singapore; 2003–2007	Succeeded by Paul Madden
Preceded by Sir Philip Thomas	Her Majesty's Consul General in New York; 2007–2011	Succeeded by Danny Lopez
