= Ralph Selby =

British diplomat (1915–1997)

Ralph Selby KCMG

British Ambassador to Norway
- In office 1972–1975
- Preceded by: Frank Brenchley
- Succeeded by: Sir Peter Scott

British Consul-General in Boston
- In office 1966–1969
- Preceded by: Sir John Curle
- Succeeded by: Leonore Storar

Personal details
- Born: 20 March 1915
- Died: 21 February 1997 (aged 81)
- Children: 3
- Education: Christ Church, Oxford
- Occupation: Diplomat

Ralph Walford Selby (20 March 1915 – 21 February 1997) was a British diplomat who served as consul-general in Boston from 1966 to 1969 and ambassador to Norway from 1972 to 1975.

== Early life and education ==
Selby was born on 20 March 1915, the eldest son of Sir Walford Selby, diplomat, and Dorothy née Orme Carter. He was educated at Eton College and Christ Church, Oxford.

== Career ==
Selby joined the Diplomatic Service in 1938, and served as third secretary in the Foreign Office until 1939. In November 1939, he enlisted with the Army and served with the Grenadier Guards from 1940 to 1945. He then resumed duty in the Foreign Office. In 1947, he was promoted to first secretary and sent to the newly opened High Commission in New Delhi.

Selby was transferred to The Hague in 1950, and acted as chargé d’affaires there in 1952 before he returned to the Foreign Office for three years serving as deputy head of the Southern Department dealing with Greece and Turkey. In 1956, he was posted to Tokyo as head of Chancery having been promoted to counsellor. He was then transferred to Copenhagen as counsellor in 1958, and on occasion acted as chargé d'affaires. In 1961, he was sent to Jakarta. Described as "perhaps his most successful posting", according to the Times, "His dispatches to London from Jakarta succeeded in guiding the British Government away from its policy of funding aid to Indonesia at the worst time of the regime of the dictatorial President Sukarno." In 1964, he was sent to Warsaw as counsellor, acting there on several occasions as chargé d'affaires.

From 1966 to 1969, Selby served as consul-general at Boston. After serving as minister at Rome from 1969 to 1972 he was appointed ambassador to Norway, a post he held until his retirement in 1975.

== Personal life and death ==
Selby married Julianna Mary Iva Snell in 1945 and had three daughters.

Selby died on 21 February 1997.

== Honours ==
Selby was appointed Companion of the Order of St Michael and St George (CMG) in the 1961 Birthday Honours.

== See also ==
- Norway–United Kingdom relations

Diplomatic posts
Preceded by Sir John Curle	British Consul-General in Boston; 1966–1969	Succeeded by Leonore Storar
Preceded by Frank Brenchley	British Ambassador to Norway; 1972–1975	Succeeded by Sir Peter Scott
