= Andrew Patrick (diplomat) =

British diplomat (born 1966)

His Excellency Andrew Patrick
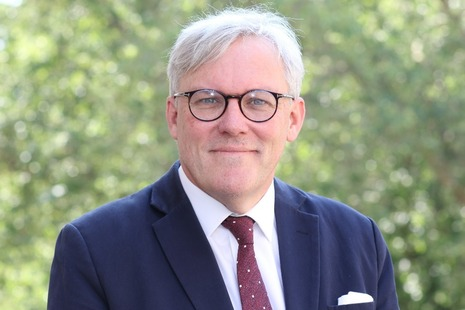
- Andrew Patrick

British High Commissioner to Sri Lanka
- Incumbent
- Assumed office August 2023
- Monarch: Charles III
- Prime Minister: Rishi Sunak; Keir Starmer; Andy Burnham
- Preceded by: James Dauris

British Ambassador to Myanmar
- In office 2013–2018
- Monarch: Elizabeth II
- Prime Minister: David Cameron; Theresa May
- Preceded by: Andrew Heyn
- Succeeded by: Dan Chugg

Personal details
- Born: February 28, 1966 (age 60)
- Education: Poltair School, University of Bristol (BSc in Maths), City University (Diploma in law)

Andrew Patrick (born 28 February 1966) is a British diplomat who has been British High Commissioner to Sri Lanka, and non-resident British High Commissioner to the Maldives, since 2023.

He was educated at Poltair School, graduated with a BSc in maths from the University of Bristol in 1987, and completed a diploma in law from City University in 1988.

He was British Ambassador to Myanmar from 2013 to 2018. He was Migration and Modern Slavery Envoy at the Foreign, Commonwealth and Development Office from 2022 to 2023.

On 21 February 2026, Nigel Farage accused the British High Commissioner to the Maldives of blocking him from participating in a humanitarian mission to Île du Coin in the Chagos Archipelago, where earlier that month a group of four Chagossians had attempted to establish a permanent settlement in their erstwhile homeland.
