= Dominick Chilcott =

British diplomat

His Excellency Sir Dominick Chilcott KCMG
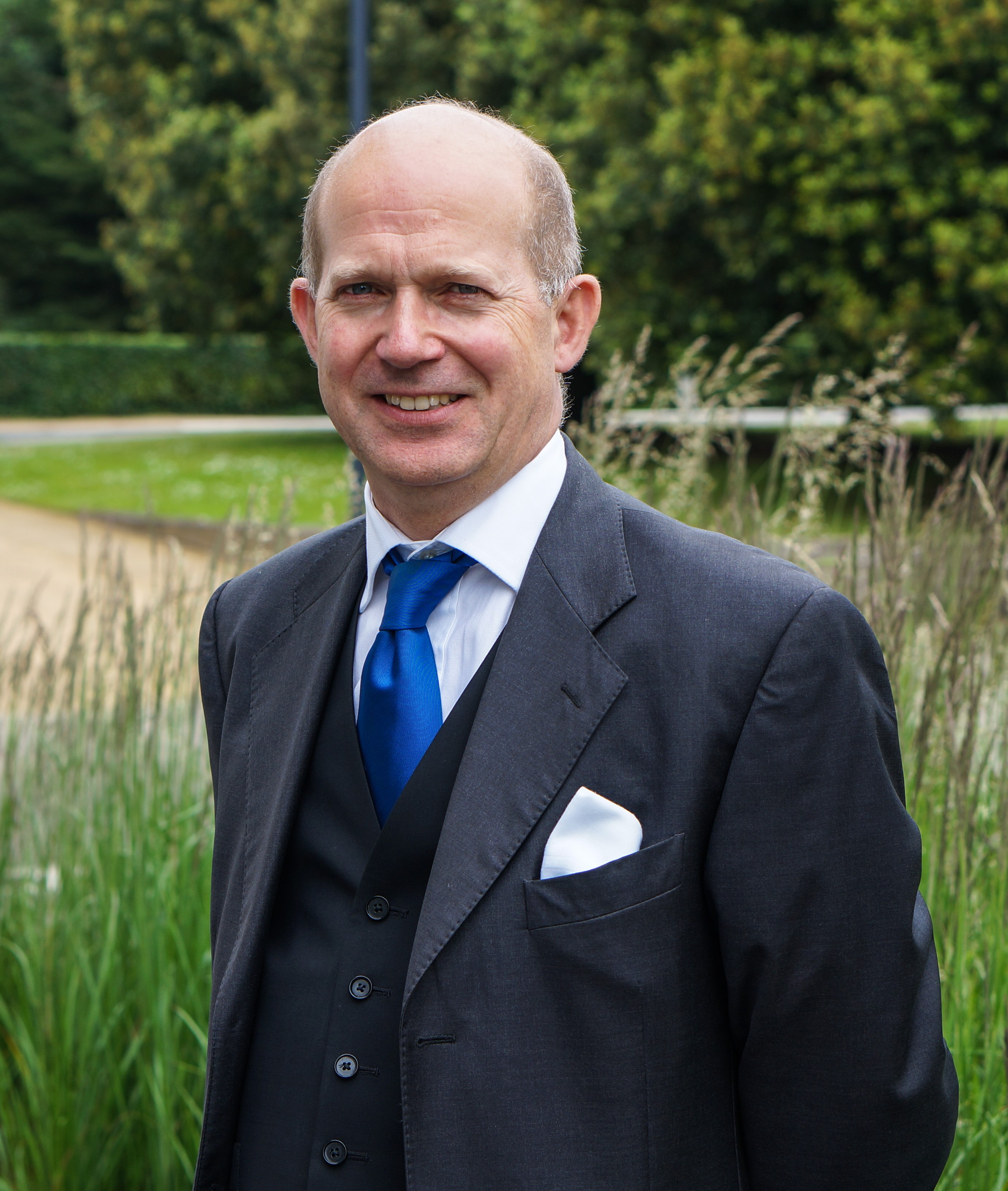

British Ambassador to Turkey
- In office 17 January 2018 – June 2022
- Monarch: Elizabeth II
- Prime Minister: Theresa May; Boris Johnson; Liz Truss; Rishi Sunak
- Preceded by: Richard Moore
- Succeeded by: Jill Morris

British Ambassador to Ireland
- In office 2012 – August 2016
- Monarch: Elizabeth II
- Prime Minister: David Cameron; Theresa May
- Preceded by: Julian King
- Succeeded by: Robin Barnett

Deputy British Ambassador to the United States
- In office 2008–2011
- Monarch: Elizabeth II
- President: George W. Bush; Barack Obama
- Prime Minister: Gordon Brown; David Cameron
- Preceded by: Peter Gooderham
- Succeeded by: Sir Philip Barton

Personal details
- Born: 17 November 1959 (age 66)
- Education: Greyfriars, Oxford

Sir Dominick John Chilcott KCMG (born 17 November 1959) is a British diplomat who was Ambassador to Turkey from 2018 to 2022.

== Early life ==
He went to the Catholic independent school, St Joseph's College, Ipswich, later also attended by his brother Martin. He attended Greyfriars, Oxford, a small Oxford permanent private hall that closed in June 2008. He gained a BA in Philosophy and Theology in 1982.

== Career ==
Chilcott joined the Foreign and Commonwealth Office (FCO) in 1982. From 1993–95 he was based in Lisbon. From 1998–2002 he worked in External Relations in Brussels at the Permanent Representation of the United Kingdom to the European Union. From 2003–06 he was Director of the EU Directorate.

In 2006, he became the High Commissioner to Sri Lanka. He met the Queen as High Commissioner on 29 June 2006. From 2008–11 he was Deputy Head of Mission to the United States.

Chilcott briefly became Ambassador to Iran in 2011 before diplomatic relations were suspended, and then Ambassador to Ireland in 2012. He was replaced in 2016 and in September 2017 the FCO announced that he was to be ambassador to Turkey from January 2018. He took up the post on 17 January 2018.

Chilcott retired from the diplomatic service in 2023 and was replaced as Ambassador to Turkey in January 2023 by Jill Morris.

As of 2025, Chilcott is listed by the UK Government's Foreign Influence Registration Scheme as a paid lobbyist for the pro-Russian Republika Srpska.

== Personal life ==
Chilcott married Jane Bromage in 1983. They have three sons and one daughter. He met his wife at Oxford. He was appointed CMG in 2003 and knighted KCMG in the 2018 New Year Honours.

== Offices held ==
Diplomatic posts
Preceded by Stephen Evans	British High Commissioner to Sri Lanka; 2006–2007	Succeeded by Peter Hayes
Preceded by Stephen Evans	British High Commissioner to the Maldives (non-resident); 2006–2007	Succeeded by Peter Hayes
Preceded by Alan Charlton	Minister and Deputy Ambassador at the British Embassy, Washington; 2008–2010	Succeeded by Philip Barton
Preceded by Sir Simon Gass	British Ambassador to Iran; 2011	Relations suspended
Preceded by Julian King	British Ambassador to Ireland; 2012–2016	Succeeded by Robin Barnett
Preceded by Richard Moore	British Ambassador to Turkey; 2018–2022	Succeeded by Jill Morris
