= Ric Todd =

British diplomat

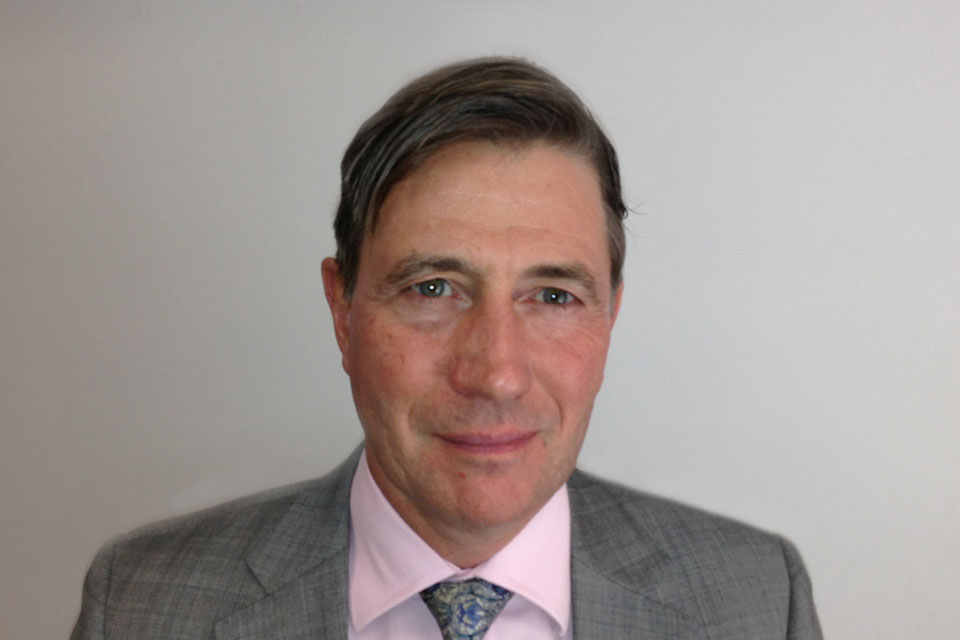

High Commissioner of the United Kingdom to Cyprus
- In office 2014–2016
- Preceded by: Matthew Kidd
- Succeeded by: Matthew Kidd

Governor of the Turks and Caicos Islands
- In office 2011–2013
- Premier: Rufus Ewing
- Preceded by: Gordon Wetherell
- Succeeded by: Peter Beckingham

Personal details
- Born: 29 August 1959 (age 67) Crawley, West Sussex, England, United Kingdom
- Spouse: Magdalena Todd
- Education: Worcester College, Oxford

Damian Roderic Todd (born 29 August 1959) is a career British diplomat who has served as Ambassador to Slovakia, Ambassador to Poland, Governor of the Turks and Caicos Islands and High Commissioner to Cyprus.

== Personal and career ==
Todd attended Lawrence Sheriff School, Rugby, then studied history at Worcester College, Oxford, and entered the Diplomatic Service in 1980. His diplomatic postings included:

- 1981–1984 British diplomat in South Africa in Cape Town and Pretoria
- 1985–1987 Foreign and Commonwealth Office (FCO), European Department
- 1987–1989 British embassay in Prague, Czechoslovakia
- 1989–1991 FCO, Economic Relations Department
- 1991–1995 British consulate in Bonn, Germany
- 1995–1997 HM Treasury and head of 2 EU policy departments
- 1997–1998 FCO, deputy head of Economic Relations Department
- 1998–2001 HM Treasury and head of 2 EU policy departments
- 1999–2001 British representative on the European Union Economic Policy Committee
- 2001–2004 British ambassador to Slovak Republic
- 2004–2007 FCO, finance director
- 2007–2011 Ambassador to Republic of Poland
- 2010–2011 Regional director for FCO Central Europe Network
- 2011–2013 Governor of the Turks and Caicos Islands
- 2014–2016 High Commissioner to Republic of Cyprus

In 2016 Todd left his post in Cyprus for personal reasons. He was replaced by Matthew Kidd, who had preceded Todd as High Commissioner.

== Criticism ==
Many Turks Islanders, including the Turks and Caicos Islands Conservation Society, criticized Todd's environmental record. While acting as Governor of Turks and Caicos, Ric Todd unilaterally amended a long-standing provision in Turks and Caicos law that prohibited the importation (and non-natural exploitation) of marine mammals in Turks and Caicos. Despite the United Kingdom's ban on performing captive animals, Todd's amendment specifically allows for the importation and use of marine mammals for the purpose of "display, exhibition and performance" – the principal marine mammal this may be targeted towards is a likely dolphin attraction.

Diplomatic posts
Preceded by David Lyscom	Ambassador of the United Kingdom to Slovakia; 2001–2004	Succeeded by Judith Macgregor
Preceded by Charles Crawford	Ambassador ofm the United Kingdom to Poland; 2007–2011	Succeeded by Robin Barnett
Government offices
Preceded by Gordon Wetherell	Governor of the Turks and Caicos Islands; 2011–2013	Succeeded by Peter Beckingham
Diplomatic posts
Preceded by Matthew Kidd	High Commissioner of the United Kingdom to Cyprus; 2014–2016	Succeeded by Matthew Kidd
