= John Addis (diplomat) =

British diplomat (1914–1983)

John Addis Photo: Foreign & Commonwealth Office

Sir John Addis KCMG (11 June 1914 – 31 July 1983) was a British diplomat, ambassador to Laos, the Philippines and China, and a collector of Ming porcelain which he gave to the British Museum.

== Career ==
John Mansfield Addis was educated at Rugby School and Christ Church, Oxford, and joined the Foreign Office in 1938. After postings at Nanking, Peking and the Foreign Office, he was ambassador to Laos 1960–62; Fellow at the Harvard Center for International Affairs 1962–63; ambassador to the Philippines 1963–70; Senior Civilian Instructor at the Imperial Defence College 1970–71; and ambassador to China 1972–74. After retiring from the Diplomatic Service, Addis was Senior Research Fellow in Contemporary Chinese Studies at Wolfson College, Oxford, 1975–82. He was a trustee of the British Museum.

== Honours ==
Addis was appointed CMG in the New Year Honours of 1959 and knighted KCMG in the New Year Honours of 1973.

Sir John Addis will be remembered with gratitude, respect and affection at the British Museum. His gift in 1975 of twenty-three pieces of early Chinese porcelain of superb quality and importance was not only one of the Museum's major benefactions this century but also a carefully thought out addition to the existing collections, every piece having been deliberately chosen in advance to fill gaps in the permanent exhibition.
— Lawrence Smith, Keeper of Oriental Antiquities, British Museum

== Publications ==
- The India-China border question, Harvard University, 1963.
- Chinese ceramics from datable tombs, Philip Wilson Publishers, 1978. ISBN 0856670391

Diplomatic posts
Preceded by Sir Anthony Lincoln	Ambassador Extraordinary and Plenipotentiary at Vientiane; 1960–1962	Succeeded by Sir Donald Hopson
Preceded by John Pilcher	Ambassador Extraordinary and Plenipotentiary at Manila; 1963–1970	Succeeded by Sir John Curle
Preceded by (no ambassador)	Ambassador Extraordinary and Plenipotentiary at Peking; 1972–1974	Succeeded by Sir Edward Youde
