= John Arthur Pilcher =

British diplomat

Sir John Arthur Pilcher GCMG

British Ambassador to Japan
- In office 1967–1972
- Monarch: Elizabeth II
- Prime Minister: Harold Wilson; Edward Heath
- Preceded by: Sir Francis Rundall
- Succeeded by: Sir Frederick Warner

British Ambassador to Austria
- In office 1965–1967
- Monarch: Elizabeth II
- Prime Minister: Harold Wilson
- Preceded by: Sir Malcolm Siborne Henderson
- Succeeded by: Sir Anthony Rumbold, 10th Baronet

British Ambassador to the Philippines
- In office 1959–1963
- Monarch: Elizabeth II
- Prime Minister: Harold Macmillan
- Preceded by: Sir George Clutton
- Succeeded by: Sir John Addis

Personal details
- Born: 16 May 1912
- Died: 10 February 1990 (aged 77)
- Education: Shrewsbury School

Sir John Arthur Pilcher GCMG (16 May 1912 – 10 February 1990) was a British diplomat, capping a long career with a posting as Her Majesty's ambassador to the Philippines (1959–1963), Austria (1965–1967) and Japan (1967–1972).

== Career ==
Educated at Shrewsbury, Pilcher's entered the consular service after passing an open examination in 1935.

His career in the Foreign Service was marked by appointment as one of His Majesty's Vice-Consuls in China in 1940.

Pilcher was the British ambassador to the Philippines 1959–63, and to Austria 1965–67 when the Queen conferred with the honour of Knight Commander in the Order of St Michael and St George.

Pilcher ended his career as Her Majesty's ambassador in Tokyo from 1967 through 1972, He was considered by some of his peers as "the last of the scholar-diplomats."

Although Pilcher was appropriately diplomatic in his professional duties, he was capable of extraordinary frankness in dispatches sent to Whitehall. While there is no doubt that Pilcher was sincere, his seeming inability to recognize an inherent double standard in his views is revealing about the attitude that many British and European scholars took towards non-Europeans in the early postwar decades. For instance, the substance of a declassified 1972 letter to the Foreign Secretary, Alec Douglas-Home, was published in the Japan Times in 2003. In that dispatch, Pilcher expressed views which are no less controversial today than when he wrote them.

His granddaughter Marissa Pilcher married to German Prince Maximilian zu Bentheim-Tecklenburg.

== Honours ==
- Order of St Michael and St George, Knight Grand Cross.

== See also ==
- List of Old Salopians
- List of Ambassadors from the United Kingdom to Austria
- List of Ambassadors from the United Kingdom to Japan
- Trilateral Commission

== Notes ==
Diplomatic posts
Preceded by Sir George Clutton	British Ambassador to the Philippines; 1959–1963	Succeeded by Sir John Addis
Preceded by Sir Malcolm Siborne Henderson	British Ambassador to Austria; 1965–1967	Succeeded by Sir Anthony Rumbold, 10th Baronet
Preceded by Sir Francis Rundall	British Ambassador to Japan; 1967–1972	Succeeded by Sir Frederick Warner
