= Rufus Ewing =

Turks and Caicos Islander politician and doctor

The Honourable Rufus Washington Ewing
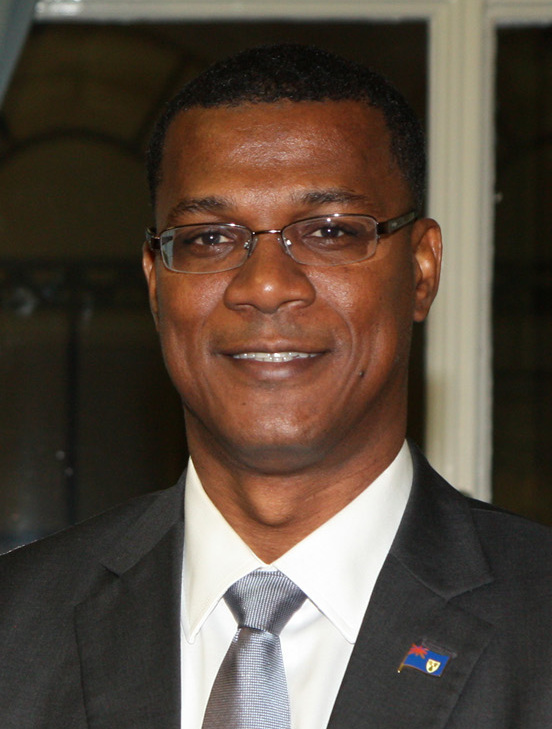

3rd Premier of the Turks and Caicos Islands
- In office 13 November 2012 – 20 December 2016
- Monarch: Elizabeth II
- Governor: Ric Todd; Anya Williams (Acting); Peter Beckingham; Anya Williams (Acting); John Freeman
- Deputy: Akierra Missick
- Preceded by: Galmo Williams
- Succeeded by: Sharlene Cartwright-Robinson

Member of the House of Assembly for All Island District
- In office 12 November 2012 – 20 December 2016 Serving with Sharlene Cartwright-Robinson; Derek Hugh Taylor; Washington Misick; Josephine Connolly

Leader of the Progressive National Party
- In office 15 October 2012 – 20 December 2016
- Preceded by: Clayton Greene
- Succeeded by: Washington Misick

Personal details
- Party: Progressive National Party
- Education: University of the West Indies (B.M.B.S., M.D.); Johns Hopkins Bloomberg School of Public Health (M.P.H.)

Rufus Washington Ewing is a Turks and Caicos Islander politician who served as the 3rd Premier of the Turks and Caicos Islands and president of the Progressive National Party (PNP) from 2012 to 2016. Prior to his tenure as premier he worked in the Ministry of Health. He resigned as president of the PNP and lost the premiership after the PNP lost the 2016 election.

== Early life ==
Rufus Washington Ewing graduated from the University of the West Indies with a bachelor's degree in medicine and surgery and a Doctor of Medicine, and Johns Hopkins Bloomberg School of Public Health with a Master of Public Health. He studied in the Bahamas, United States, and Canada.

== Career ==
In the Ministry of Health Ewing worked as Deputy Chief Medical Officer and Director of Health Services. On 12 November 2012, he was elected president of the TCI Civil Service Association.

In 2012, Ewing was elected president of the Progressive National Party (PNP). The PNP won the 2012 election and Ewing became the 3rd Premier of the Turks and Caicos Islands on 12 November. He was Minister of Tourism in his own cabinet. The PNP lost the 2016 election, with Ewing losing his own seat. Ewing resigned as president of the PNP on 16 December.

Turks and Caicos received its first sovereign credit rating in 2014; it was a BBB+ from S&P Global Ratings.

== Political positions ==
Ewing avoided discussing the idea of Canada annexing the Turks and Caicos Islands. He sought better socioeconomic relations with Canada and stated that he was "not closing the door completely" on the idea of the two entities merging.

== Works cited ==
=== News ===
- Defralien, Todeline (16 January 2017). "Defeated Dr. Rufus Ewing resigns as PNP leader; quits politics". The Sun Turks and Caicos. Archived from the original on 9 July 2025.
- MacKinnon, Leslie (27 May 2014). "Stow that dream of retiring in the Turks and Caicos (for now)". Canadian Broadcasting Corporation. Archived from the original on 9 July 2025.
- O'Malley, Kady (26 May 2014). "Turks and Caicos visit leads to talk of annexation ... again". Canadian Broadcasting Corporation. Archived from the original on 9 July 2025.

=== Web ===
- "Hon. Dr. Rufus Washington Ewing". Turks and Caicos Islands. Archived from the original on 9 July 2025.
- "Turks and Caicos secures first sovereign credit rating". Government of the United Kingdom. 1 July 2014. Archived from the original on 23 January 2025.

Political offices
Vacant Office suspended 2009–2012 Title last held by Galmo Williams	Premier of the Turks and Caicos Islands; 2012–2016	Succeeded by Sharlene Cartwright-Robinson
Party political offices
Preceded by Clayton Stanfield Greene	Leader of the Progressive National Party; 2012–2016	Succeeded by Washington Misick
