= List of high commissioners of the United Kingdom to Sri Lanka =

The following persons have served as British high commissioner to Sri Lanka, previously known as Ceylon. Countries belonging to the Commonwealth of Nations typically exchange high commissioners rather than ambassadors. Though there are a few technical differences, they are in practice one and the same office. Since 1965 when the Maldives were granted independence from the United Kingdom, the British high commissioner to Sri Lanka has doubled as the (non-resident) British high commissioner to the Maldives (from 1982 to 2016) and as the British ambassador to the Maldives (1965 to 1982, and October 2016 to 2019). After 2019 the role of ambassador, and then high commissioner, to the Maldives became a separate position.

== List of British high commissioners ==
=== Dominion of Ceylon ===
- 1948–1951: Sir Walter Hankinson
- 1951–1957: Sir Cecil Syers
- 1957–1962: Sir Alexander Morley
- 1962–1966: Sir Michael Walker
- 1966–1969: Sir Stanley Tomlinson
- 1969–1972: Sir Angus Mackintosh

=== Sri Lanka ===
- 1972–1975: Sir Harold Smedley
- 1976–1979: David Aiers
- 1979–1984: Sir John Nicholas
- 1984–1987: John Stewart
- 1987–1991: David Gladstone
- 1991–1996: John Field
- 1996–1999: David Tatham
- 1999–2002: Linda Duffield
- 2002–2006: Stephen Evans
- 2006–2008: Dominick Chilcott
- 2008–2011: Peter Hayes
- 2011–2015: John Rankin
- 2015–2019: James Dauris
- 2019–2023: Sarah Hulton
- 2023–present: Andrew Patrick
