= Jill Morris =

British diplomat

Her Excellency Jill Morris CMG
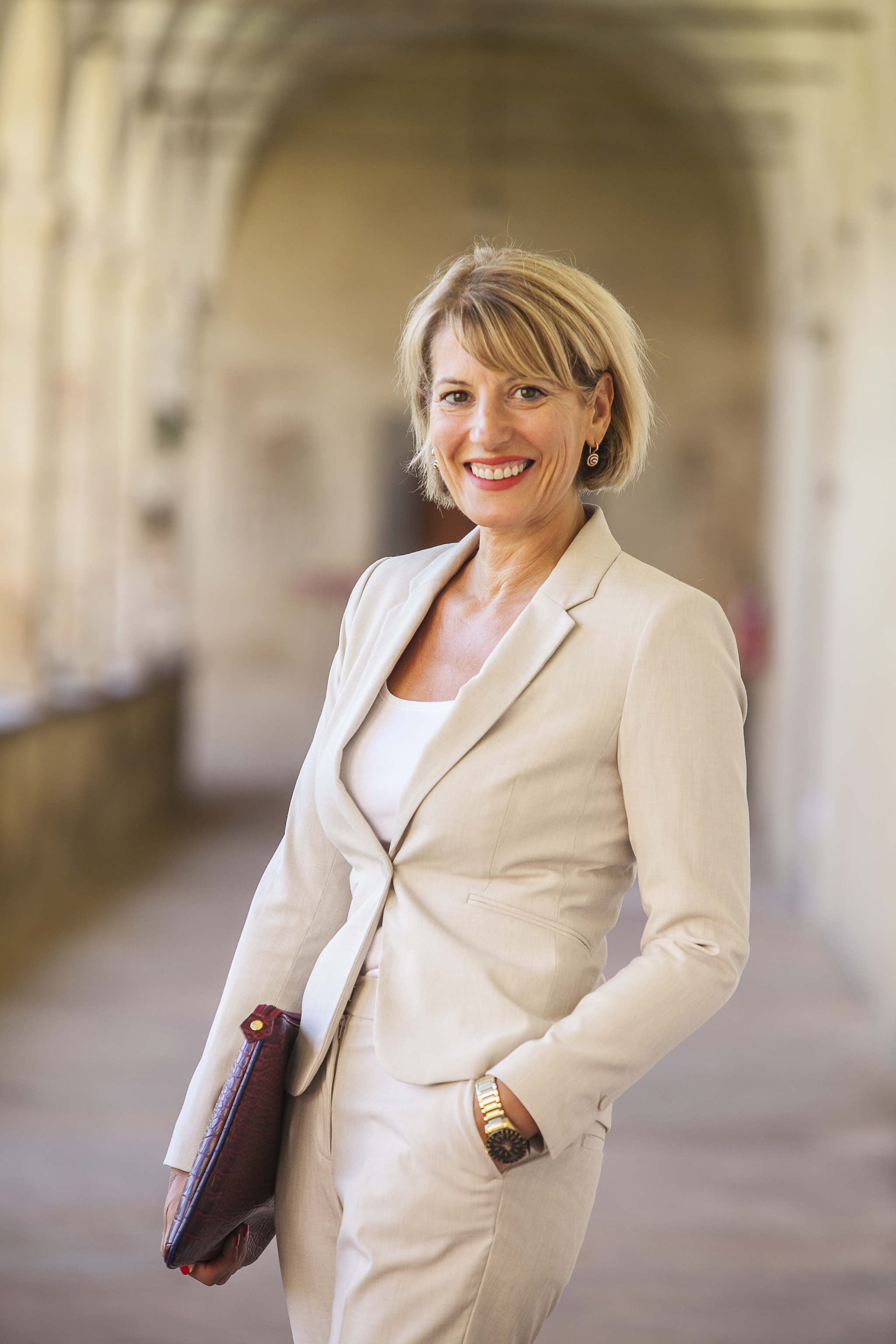
- Morris in 2019

British Ambassador to Turkey
- In office January 2023 – July 2026
- Monarch: Charles III
- Prime Minister: Rishi Sunak; Keir Starmer; Andy Burnham
- Preceded by: Dominick Chilcott
- Succeeded by: Jennifer Anderson

British Ambassador to Italy
- In office July 2016 – January 2022
- Monarch: Elizabeth II
- Prime Minister: Theresa May; Boris Johnson
- Preceded by: Christopher Prentice
- Succeeded by: Edward Llewellyn

Personal details
- Born: 14 August 1967 (age 59) Chester, Cheshire, England
- Education: Southampton University; Warwick University
- Occupation: Diplomat

Jill Morris CMG (born 14 August 1967) is a British diplomat who was the British Ambassador to Italy and non-resident British Ambassador to San Marino, succeeding Christopher Prentice. In 2023, she assumed the post of British Ambassador to Turkey, departing in 2026. She is the first women to have ever held either posts.

== Early life ==
Morris was born in Chester, Cheshire and studied Modern Languages at Southampton (MA) and Warwick (MPhil) Universities.

== Career ==
Morris joined the Foreign and Commonwealth Office in 1999. She has had several postings in Europe and within the United Kingdom. On 13 June 2015, during the Birthday Honours, Morris was appointed Companion of the Order of St Michael and St George for services to British foreign policy when serving as Director for Europe.

In December 2015, it was announced that Morris was to be appointed the British Ambassador to Italy and San Marino in July 2016. She became the British Ambassador to Turkey in January 2023. She left Turkey in the summer of 2026.
