= Adrian Thorpe (diplomat) =

British diplomat (born 1942)

Adrian Charles Thorpe CMG FRSA (born 29 July 1942 in Cambridge) is a British retired ambassador.

Thorpe is a son of Lewis Thorpe and his wife Barbara Reynolds. He was educated at The Leys School, Cambridge, and Christ's College, Cambridge. He entered the diplomatic service in 1965 and was posted to Tokyo where he served for a total of 14 years between postings at Beirut, Bonn and the FCO in London. He was deputy High Commissioner in Kuala Lumpur 1989–1995, British Ambassador to the Philippines 1995–1998, and Ambassador to Mexico 1999–2002.

Thorpe speaks Japanese, German, French and Spanish, and married Miyoko Kosugi in 1968.

== Honours ==
- United Kingdom: Companion of the Order of St Michael and St George, 1994
- Philippines: Grand Cross of the Order of Sikatuna, Rank of Datu (24 November 1998)

Diplomatic posts
Preceded by Alan Montgomery	British Ambassador to the Philippines; 1995–1998	Succeeded by Alan Collins
Preceded by Adrian Beamish	British Ambassador to Mexico; 1999–2002	Succeeded by Denise Holt
