= Ruth Blackman =

Politician from Turks and Caicos

Ruth Blackman is British politician and civil servant, who is Member of Parliament for South Caicos, in the Turks and Caicos Islands. Her political career began as Clerk of the Executive Council and Legislative Council in 1978. She remained in that role until 1995, when the councils split; Blackman then continued to work for the Legislative Council until 2007. In 2006 she was the first person to be appointed to the role of Cabinet Secretary. She retired from the Civil Service in 2009.

In 2012, she was appointed to the Turks and Caicos House of Assembly, alongside Clarence Selver. In the 2016 general election, she was elected as the Member of Parliament for South Caicos with 45.77% of the vote, representing the Progressive National Party. In 2017 she held the post of Permanent Secretary in the Ministry of Culture, Sports and Youth.

Blackman has also presented current affaires programmes for Radio Turks and Caicos. She is from Grand Turk and her father was James Alexander George Smith McCartney, first Chief Minister of the Turks and Caicos.
