= 2016 Turks and Caicos Islands general election =

2016 Turks and Caicos Islands General Election
- December 15, 2016

15 seats in the House of Assembly 8 seats needed for a majority
- Registered: 7,732
- Turnout: 6,217 (80.4%)
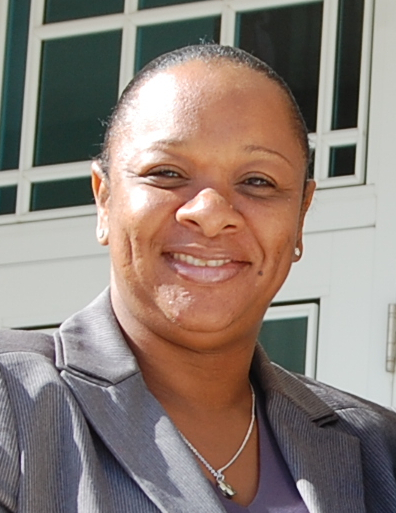

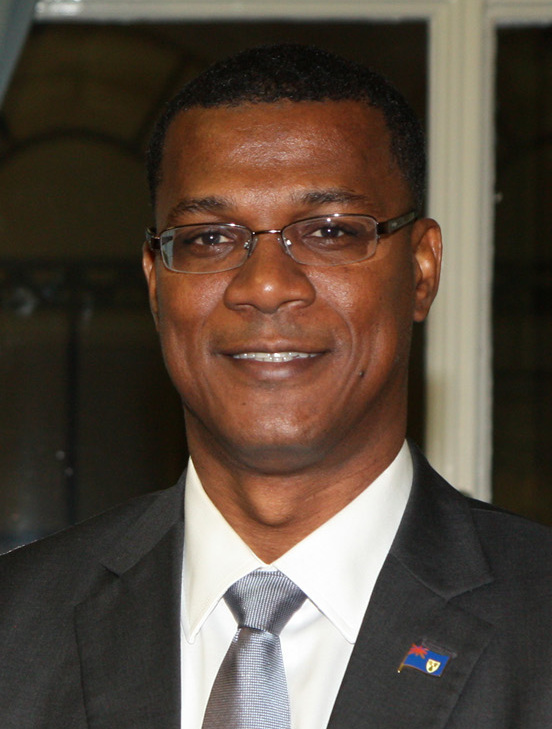
	First party	Second party	Third party
Leader	Sharlene Cartwright-Robinson	Rufus Ewing	Oswald Skippings
Party	People's Democratic Movement	Progressive National Party	Progressive Democratic Alliance
Leader's seat	At-Large/All-Island	At-Large/All-Island	At-Large/All-Island
Seats won	10	5	0
Seat change	▲3	▼3	No change
Popular vote	16,991	12,987	1,360
Percentage	47.9%	36.6%	3.8%
Premier before election
Rufus Ewing
Progressive National Party
Premier after Election
Sharlene Cartwright-Robinson
People's Democratic Movement

General elections were held in Turks and Caicos Islands on 15 December 2016. The result was a victory for the People's Democratic Movement (PDM), with Sharlene Cartwright-Robinson becoming the islands' first female Premier. Following the election outgoing Prime Minister Rufus Ewing resigned as Progressive National Party (PNP) leader and quit politics.

== Electoral system ==
At the time of the election, the House of Assembly had 15 elected members and four appointed members. The 15 elected members were elected by two methods; ten were elected from single-member constituencies, with five elected on an at-large basis, with voters able to vote for up to five candidates at the national level. The four appointed members include one nominated by the Premier, one nominated by the Leader of the Opposition and two members appointed by the Governor.

== Campaign ==
A total of 31 candidates contested the 10 single-member constituencies; the PDM and PNP both ran full slates of 10 candidates, whilst the Progressive Democratic Alliance (PDA) had eight. The remaining three candidates were independents. There were also 21 candidates in the at-large constituency, five each from the PDM and PNP, four from the PDA and seven independents.

== Results ==
Party	District			At-large			Total seats	+/–
Party	Votes	%	Seats	Votes	%	Seats	Total seats	+/–
People's Democratic Movement	3,169	51.20	6	13,822	47.28	4	10	+3
Progressive National Party	2,645	42.74	4	10,342	35.38	1	5	–3
Progressive Democratic Alliance	243	3.93	0	1,117	3.82	0	0	New
Independents	132	2.13	0	3,952	13.52	0	0	0
Nominated members							4	0
Ex officio members							2	0
Total	6,189	100.00	10	29,233	100.00	5	21	0
Valid votes	6,189	99.21						
Invalid/blank votes	49	0.79						
Total votes	6,238	100.00						
Registered voters/turnout	7,732	80.68						
Source: RTC

=== By constituency ===
Constituency		Candidate	Party	Votes
1	Grand Turk North	George Lightbourne	Progressive National Party	305
1	Grand Turk North	Derek Rolle	People's Democratic Movement	273
1	Grand Turk North	Kwame Odinga Smith	Progressive Democratic Alliance	21
2	Grand Turk South and Saltcay	Edwin Astwood	People's Democratic Movement	399
2	Grand Turk South and Saltcay	Arthur Lightbourne	Progressive National Party	276
2	Grand Turk South and Saltcay	Noel Terrence Skippings	Progressive Democratic Alliance	66
2	Grand Turk South and Saltcay	Valerie Jennings	Independent	12
3	South Caicos	Ruth Blackman	Progressive National Party	146
3	South Caicos	McAllister Eusene Hanchell	Independent	97
3	South Caicos	Keno Shamado Forbes	People's Democratic Movement	70
3	South Caicos	Christopher Emanuel Hall	Progressive Democratic Alliance	6
4	Middle and North Caicos	Ralph Higgs	People's Democratic Movement	262
4	Middle and North Caicos	Mark Fulford	Progressive National Party	201
5	Leeward (Providenciales)	Akierra Missick	Progressive National Party	376
5	Leeward (Providenciales)	Ezra Ringo Tyrone Taylor	People's Democratic Movement	289
5	Leeward (Providenciales)	Calsada Carolie Johnson	Progressive Democratic Alliance	17
6	The Bight (Providenciales)	Porsha Stubbs-Smith	Progressive National Party	285
6	The Bight (Providenciales)	George C.D. Pratt	People's Democratic Movement	284
6	The Bight (Providenciales)	Dozzlie McLom Delancy	Progressive Democratic Alliance	38
7	Cheshire Hall and Richmond Hill (Providenciales)	Douglas Parnell	People's Democratic Movement	451
7	Cheshire Hall and Richmond Hill (Providenciales)	Amanda Misick	Progressive National Party	347
7	Cheshire Hall and Richmond Hill (Providenciales)	Charles Delancy	Progressive Democratic Alliance	43
8	Blue Hills (Providenciales)	Mixmillian Goldray Ewing	People's Democratic Movement	366
8	Blue Hills (Providenciales)	Claudine Ewing-Pratt	Progressive National Party	267
8	Blue Hills (Providenciales)	Ciclyn Been	Progressive Democratic Alliance	37
9	Five Cays (Providenciales)	Sean Rickard Astwood	People's Democratic Movement	470
9	Five Cays (Providenciales)	Rachel Marshall Taylor	Progressive National Party	269
9	Five Cays (Providenciales)	Bobbie Chambers	Progressive Democratic Alliance	15
10	Wheeland (Providenciales)	Vaden Delroy Williams	People's Democratic Movement	305
10	Wheeland (Providenciales)	Dameko Canez Dean	Progressive National Party	173
10	Wheeland (Providenciales)	Hudson James Parker	Independent	23
All Island District; 5 elected at-large
All Island District; 5 elected at-large		Sharlene Cartwright-Robinson	People's Democratic Movement	3,024
All Island District; 5 elected at-large		Josephine Connolly	People's Democratic Movement	3,019
All Island District; 5 elected at-large		Derek Hugh Taylor	People's Democratic Movement	2,740
All Island District; 5 elected at-large		Karen Evadne Malcolm	People's Democratic Movement	2,725
All Island District; 5 elected at-large		Washington Misick	Progressive National Party	2,335
All Island District; 5 elected at-large		Robert A. Been	People's Democratic Movement	2,314
All Island District; 5 elected at-large		Rufus Ewing	Progressive National Party	2,234
All Island District; 5 elected at-large		John Malcolm	Progressive National Party	2,011
All Island District; 5 elected at-large		Ricardo Don-Hue Gardner	Progressive National Party	1,901
All Island District; 5 elected at-large		Sheba Latrice Wilson	Progressive National Party	1,861
All Island District; 5 elected at-large		Michael Misick	Independent	1,629
All Island District; 5 elected at-large		Jasmin Walkin	Independent	834
All Island District; 5 elected at-large		Sabrina Elizebeth Green	Independent	675
All Island District; 5 elected at-large		Oswald Skippings	Progressive Democratic Alliance	549
All Island District; 5 elected at-large		Clarence Wesley Selver	Independent	301
All Island District; 5 elected at-large		Samuel Iotis Harvey	Progressive Democratic Alliance	255
All Island District; 5 elected at-large		Courtney Missick	Independent	240
All Island District; 5 elected at-large		Damian Wilson	Independent	206
All Island District; 5 elected at-large		Shirley Louise Clarke-Calcano	Progressive Democratic Alliance	178
All Island District; 5 elected at-large		Herbert Andrew Swann Jr.	Progressive Democratic Alliance	135
All Island District; 5 elected at-large		Oscar O’Brien Forbes	Independent	67
Source: RTC
