= John Freeman (diplomat) =

British diplomat, Governor of the Turks and Caicos Islands (2016–2019)

John Freeman CMG
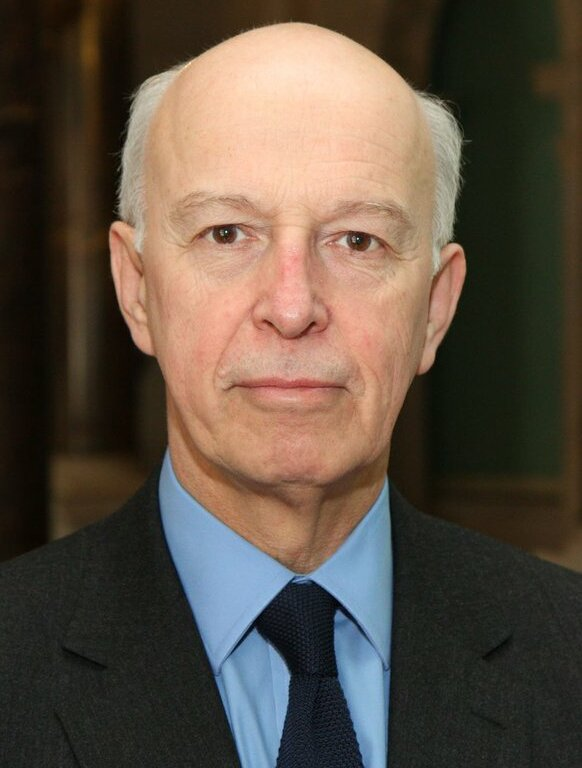

14th Governor of the Turks and Caicos Islands
- In office October 2016 – July 2019
- Monarch: Elizabeth II
- Premier: Rufus Ewing; Sharlene Cartwright-Robinson
- Preceded by: Peter Beckingham
- Succeeded by: Nigel Dakin

British Ambassador to Argentina
- In office 2012–2016
- Preceded by: Shan Morgan
- Succeeded by: Mark Kent

Personal details
- Born: 25 March 1951 (age 75) London, United Kingdom
- Spouse: Corinna Freeman
- Education: King's College London

John Patrick George Freeman CMG (born 25 March 1951) is a retired British diplomat who until July 2019 was Governor of the Turks and Caicos Islands.

== Career ==
Freeman was educated at King's College London where he gained a PhD in 1986 with the thesis titled "Britain's nuclear arms control policy in the context of Anglo-American relations 1957–68", which later became a book published by Macmillan. He subsequently joined the Foreign and Commonwealth Office (FCO) in 1986, serving at first as Head of the South Africa Section, 1986–1989. He has been Permanent Representative to the United Nations in Vienna 1997–2001 and Permanent Representative to the Conference on Disarmament 2004–2006, and was seconded as Deputy Director-General of the Organisation for the Prohibition of Chemical Weapons 2006–2011. He was Ambassador to the Argentine Republic 2012–2016. He has been a visiting professor at King's College London.

Freeman was appointed Companion of the Order of St Michael and St George (CMG) in the 2016 New Year Honours.
