= Frank Brenchley =

British diplomat (1918–2011)

Frank Brenchley CMG

British Ambassador to Norway
- In office 1968–1972
- Preceded by: Sir Ian Scott
- Succeeded by: Ralph Selby

British Ambassador to Poland
- In office 1972–1974
- Preceded by: Sir Nicholas Henderson
- Succeeded by: Norman Reddaway

Personal details
- Born: 9 April 1918
- Died: 7 July 2011 (aged 93)
- Spouse: Edith Helen Helfand (d. 1980)
- Children: three daughters
- Education: Merton College, Oxford

Thomas Frank Brenchley CMG (9 April 1918 – 7 July 2011) was a British diplomat.

== Career ==
Frank Brenchley was educated at Sir William Turner's School, Coatham, North Yorkshire, and Merton College, Oxford. He served with the Royal Corps of Signals 1939–46 as an intelligence officer in the Middle East. He was assistant military attaché at Ankara 1943–45 while the spy Cicero was operating, and was Director, Telecommunications Liaison, Syria and Lebanon, 1945–46. After leaving the army he spent two years as a civil servant at GCHQ before transferring to the Foreign Office in 1949. He served in Singapore, Cairo, MECAS, Khartoum and Jeddah before returning to London as Head of the Arabian Department of the Foreign Office 1963–67 and then Assistant Under-Secretary of State, Foreign Office, 1967–68.

Brenchley was Ambassador to Norway 1968–72, Ambassador to Poland 1972–74 and finally Deputy Secretary, Cabinet Office, 1975–76. He retired from the Diplomatic Service and became Deputy Secretary-General and then Chief Executive of the Arab-British Chamber of Commerce 1976–83. He was chairman of the Institute for Study of Conflict 1983–89, chairman of the Research Institute for the Study of Conflict and Terrorism 1989–94, and also president of the International Institute for the Study of Conflict in Geneva 1989–91.

During his retirement Brenchley returned to Merton College, Oxford, as member of the Senior Common Room in 1987 and as honorary Fellow in 1991. He gained a DPhil doctorate in 2001.

In 1986 he presented his collection of first editions and papers by and about T. S. Eliot to Merton College Library and also presented a bust of Eliot by Jacob Epstein which has been placed in the foyer of the new lecture theatre named after the poet.

Brenchley was appointed CMG in the 1964 New Year Honours.

== Publications ==
- Norway and her Soviet Neighbour: NATO's Arctic Frontier, Institute for the Study of Conflict, 1982
- Diplomatic Immunities and State-sponsored Terrorism in Conflict Studies no.164, Institute for the Study of Conflict, London, 1984. ISSN 0069-8792
- Living With Terrorism: the problem of air piracy, Institute for the Study of Conflict, 1986
- Britain and the Middle East: an economic history 1945–87, Lester Crook, London, 1989. ISBN 1870915070
- Aegean Conflict and the Law of the Sea in Conflict Studies no.232, 1990.
- Britain and the 1967 Arab-Israeli War, DPhil thesis, University of Oxford, 2000
- Britain, the Six-Day War and its Aftermath, I. B.Tauris, London, 2005. ISBN 1850434069
