= Jonathan Knott =

British diplomat

His Excellency Jonathan Knott CMG
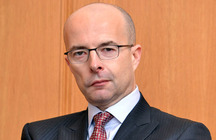

British Ambassador to Poland
- In office April 2016 – 2020
- Monarch: Elizabeth II
- Prime Minister: David Cameron; Theresa May; Boris Johnson
- Preceded by: Robin Barnett
- Succeeded by: Anna Clunes

British Ambassador to Hungary
- In office February 2012 – April 2015
- Monarch: Elizabeth II
- Prime Minister: David Cameron
- Preceded by: Gregory Dorey
- Succeeded by: Theresa Bubbear

Personal details
- Spouse: Angela
- Children: 3 (2 sons, 1 daughter)
- Education: Oxford University
- Occupation: Diplomat

Graeme Jonathan Knott CMG is a British diplomat and was the British Ambassador to Poland between 2016 and 2020. He also served as the British Ambassador to Hungary between 2012 and 2015.

== Personal life ==
Jonathan holds an MA in law from Oxford University, and he is a member of the Chartered Institute of Management Accountants. He speaks English, French, Spanish and Hungarian. In 1996 he married the famous presenter of Mexican television Raquel Bigorra. In the year 2000 they divorced. He is married to Angela Susan Knott and has one daughter and two sons.

== Career ==
Knott joined the Foreign & Commonwealth Office (FCO) in 1988 and has held a variety of diplomatic posts at home and abroad, several with a particular focus on commercial and corporate finance issues. He has been posted in Havana, Mexico City, Paris, Seoul, Budapest and Warsaw. Knott was Her Majesty's Ambassador to Hungary between February 2012 and April 2015. In April 2016, he was appointed as Her Majesty's Ambassador to Republic of Poland, ending his term in 2020. Knott became Her Majesty's Trade Commissioner for Latin America and the Caribbean in February 2021 and then also became Her Majesty's Consul General in São Paulo in August 2021.

Knott was appointed Companion of the Order of St Michael and St George (CMG) in the 2019 Birthday Honours.

Jonathan Knott became Her Majesty's Trade Commissioner for Latin America and the Caribbean in February 2021. He became Her Majesty's Consul General in São Paulo in August 2021 when he arrived in Brazil.
