= Anna Clunes =

British diplomat

Her Excellency Anna Clunes CMG OBE
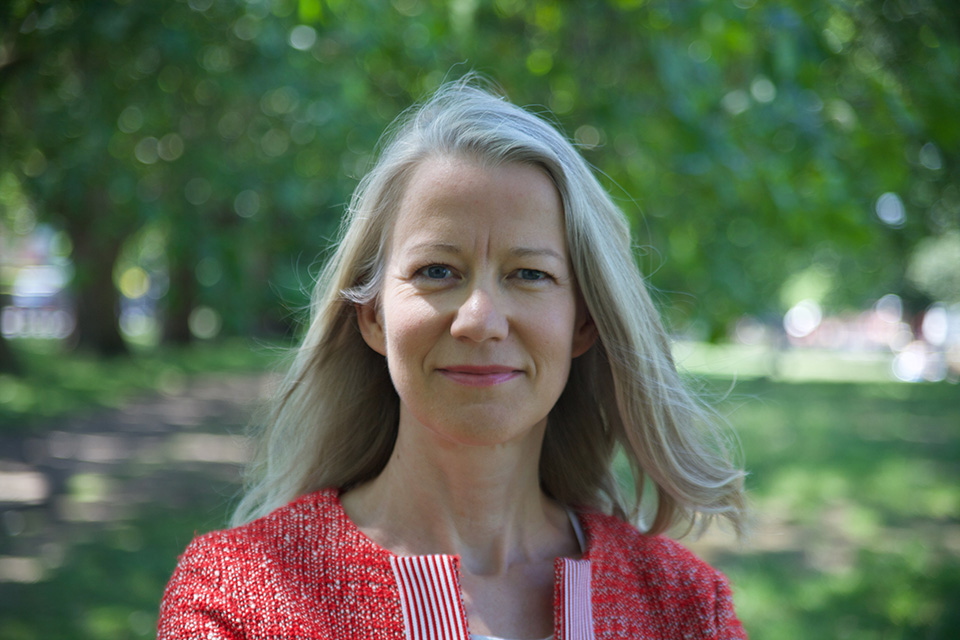

British Ambassador to Poland
- In office September 2020 – August 2025
- Monarchs: Elizabeth II; Charles III
- Prime Minister: Boris Johnson; Liz Truss; Rishi Sunak; Keir Starmer
- Preceded by: Jonathan Knott
- Succeeded by: Melinda Simmons

Personal details
- Education: University of Cambridge

Anna Louise Clunes is a British diplomat, who served as the British Ambassador to Poland from September 2020 until August 2025.

Clunes was appointed a Companion of the Order of Saint Michael and Saint George in October 2020 for "services to British foreign policy".

== Education ==
Anna Clunes attended the University of Cambridge from 1991 to 1994, receiving an M.A. in Mathematics.

== Career ==
Two years after graduating, in 1996, and up until 2000, Clunes served as Second Secretary in the Department for International Development in Warsaw. For the next three years, from 2000 to 2003, Clunes served as First Secretary of Counter-Terrorism at the UK Mission to the United Nations. Clunes continued to work almost exclusively in foreign diplomacy for the United Kingdom until 2010, when she was appointed Head of Communications and Engagement at the Foreign and Commonwealth Office, which she continued to work at until 2017, by which time she'd already been appointed Director of Protocol, serving from 2012 to 2015, and Director of Economic Diplomacy, serving from 2015 to 2017.

In 2017, as part of the United Kingdom's Brexit efforts, Clunes served as Director on the Department for Exiting the European Union. She served in this position until 2020. During her time as Director, Clunes emphasized the importance of maintaining relations with the European Union, trade and otherwise, "from counteracting climate change to international security".
