= List of ambassadors of the United Kingdom to the Philippines =

Ambassador of the United Kingdom of Great Britain and Northern Ireland to the Republic of the Philippines
- Sugo ng Reyno Unido ng Dakilang Britanya at Hilagang Irlanda sa Republika ng Pilipinas
- Royal arms of His Majesty's Government

- British diplomatic flag

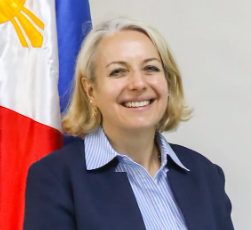
- Incumbent; Sarah Hulton since September 2025
- Foreign, Commonwealth and Development Office; Embassy of the United Kingdom, Manila
- Style: Her Excellency
- Reports to: Secretary of State for Foreign, Commonwealth and Development Affairs
- Seat: 120 Upper McKinley Road, McKinley Hill, Taguig City 1634
- Appointer: The Crown on advice of the prime minister
- Term length: At His Majesty's pleasure
- Inaugural holder: John William Perry Farren (Note: Consul general); Linton Foulds (Note: Minister plenipotentiary); Frank Gibbs (Note: First ambassador extraordinary)
- Formation: July 7, 1844 (Note: Consulate general until 29 October 1946); October 30, 1946 (Note: Minister plenipotentiary and ambassador extraordinary)
- Salary: £90,000-£95,000
- Website: British Embassy Manila

The ambassador of the United Kingdom of Great Britain and Northern Ireland to the Republic of the Philippines (Filipino: Sugo ng Reyno Unido ng Dakilang Britanya at Hilagang Irlanda sa Republika ng Pilipinas) is the United Kingdom's foremost diplomatic representative in the Republic of the Philippines, and head of the UK's diplomatic mission there. The official title is His Britannic Majesty's Ambassador to the Republic of the Philippines.

The British ambassador to the Philippines is also accredited as a non-resident ambassador to the Republic of Palau. There is no British embassy or consulate in Palau.

The following is a chronological list of British heads of mission (ministers and ambassadors) in the Philippines from 1844. Before the country's independence in 1946, there were no ambassadors exchanged between the two countries, the highest rank being envoy extraordinary and minister plenipotentiary – a rank just below ambassador as well as consuls-general based in Manila. The rank of ambassador extraordinary and plenipotentiary was later officially elevated in 1954.

== List of heads of mission ==
=== Consuls and consuls-general during the Spanish and American colonial periods ===
Head of mission	Tenure begins	Tenure ends	British monarch	British prime minister	Accredited during the Government of	Note(s)
John William Perry Farren	1844	1864	Victoria	Robert Peel; John Russell; Edward Smith-Stanley; George Hamilton-Gordon; Henry John Temple; Edward Smith-Stanley; Henry John Temple	Francisco de Paula Alcalá de la Torre; Narciso Clavería; Antonio María Blanco; Juan Antonio de Urbiztondo; Ramón Montero; Manuel Pavía; Ramón Montero; Manuel Crespo; Ramón Montero; Fernándo Norzagaray; Ramón María Solano; Juan Herrera Dávila; José Lemery; Salvador Valdés; Rafaél de Echagüe	
George Thome Ricketts	1866	1875	Victoria	John Russell; Edward Smith-Stanley; Benjamin Disraeli; William Ewart Gladstone; Benjamin Disraeli	Joaquín del Solar; Juan de Lara; José Laureano de Sanz; Juan Antonio Osorio; Joaquín del Solar; José de la Gándara; Manuel Maldonado; Carlos María de la Torre; Rafael Izquierdo; Manuel MacCrohon; Juan Alaminos; Manuel Blanco Valderrama; José Malcampo y Monje	
William Gifford Palgrave	1876	1877	Victoria	John Russell; Edward Smith-Stanley; Benjamin Disraeli; William Ewart Gladstone; Benjamin Disraeli	Joaquín del Solar; Juan de Lara; José Laureano de Sanz; Juan Antonio Osorio; Joaquín del Solar; José de la Gándara; Manuel Maldonado; Carlos María de la Torre; Rafael Izquierdo; Manuel MacCrohon; Juan Alaminos; Manuel Blanco Valderrama; José Malcampo y Monje	
Roderick Donald MacKenzie	1877	1895	Victoria	Benjamin Disraeli; William Ewart Gladstone; Robert Gascoyne-Cecil; William Ewart Gladstone; Archibald Primrose; Robert Gascoyne-Cecil	Manuel Blanco Valderrama; Domingo Moriones y Murillo; Rafael Rodríguez Arias; Fernando Primo de Rivera; Emilio Molíns; Joaquín Jovellar; Emilio Molíns; Emilio Terrero; Antonio Moltó; Federico Lobatón; Valeriano Weyler; Eulogio Despujol; Federico Ochando; Ramón Blanco	
Edward Henry Rawson-Walker	1895	1898	Victoria	Benjamin Disraeli; William Ewart Gladstone; Robert Gascoyne-Cecil; William Ewart Gladstone; Archibald Primrose; Robert Gascoyne-Cecil	Ramón Blanco; Camilo García de Polavieja; José de Lachambre; Fernando Primo de Rivera; Basilio Augustín; Fermín Jáudenes; Francisco Rizzo; Diego de los Ríos	Died of sickness during the Battle of Manila. Belgian consul Édouard André assumed the role as consul for Britain.
William Joseph Kenny	1903	1908	Edward VII	Arthur Balfour; Henry Campbell-Bannerman; H. H. Asquith	William Howard Taft; Luke Edward Wright; Henry Clay Ide; James Francis Smith	
Alfred Ernest Wileman	1909	1914	Edward VII	Arthur Balfour; Henry Campbell-Bannerman; H. H. Asquith	James Francis Smith; William Cameron Forbes; Newton W. Gilbert	
Montague Bentley Talbot Paske-Smith	1915	1919	George V	H. H. Asquith; David Lloyd George; Bonar Law; Stanley Baldwin; Ramsay MacDonald; Stanley Baldwin; Ramsay MacDonald; Stanley Baldwin	Francis Burton Harrison; Charles Yeater; Leonard Wood; Eugene Allen Gilmore; Henry L. Stimson; Eugene Allen Gilmore; Dwight F. Davis; George C. Butte; Theodore Roosevelt Jr. Frank Murphy	
Thomas Joseph Harrington	1920	1935	George V	H. H. Asquith; David Lloyd George; Bonar Law; Stanley Baldwin; Ramsay MacDonald; Stanley Baldwin; Ramsay MacDonald; Stanley Baldwin	Francis Burton Harrison; Charles Yeater; Leonard Wood; Eugene Allen Gilmore; Henry L. Stimson; Eugene Allen Gilmore; Dwight F. Davis; George C. Butte; Theodore Roosevelt Jr. Frank Murphy	
Arthur Powlett Blunt	1935	1937	George V	Stanley Baldwin; Neville Chamberlain	Frank Murphy (as Governor-General of the Philippines; later High Commissioner to the Philippines); Manuel L. Quezon (as President of the Commonwealth of the Philippines)	
William Turner	1937	1941	George VI	Neville Chamberlain; Winston Churchill	Manuel L. Quezon (as President of the Commonwealth of the Philippines)	
Diplomatic relations were suspended due to the Japanese occupation of the Philippines from 1941 until 1945
Francis McDermot	1945	1946	George VI	Winston Churchill; Clement Attlee	Sergio Osmeña (as President of the Commonwealth of the Philippines)	

=== Ministers ===
Head of mission	Tenure begins	Tenure ends	British monarch	British prime minister	Philippine president
Linton Foulds	1946	1951	George VI	Clement Attlee	Manuel Roxas
Sir Frank Gibbs	1951	1954	Elizabeth II	Clement Attlee; Winston Churchill	Elpidio Quirino

=== Ambassadors ===
Head of mission	Tenure begins	Tenure ends	British monarch	British prime minister	Philippine president	Note(s)
Sir Frank Gibbs	1954	1955	Elizabeth II	Winston Churchill	Ramon Magsaysay	
Sir George Clutton	1955	1959	Elizabeth II	Anthony Eden; Harold Macmillan	Ramon Magsaysay	
Sir John Arthur Pilcher	1959	1963	Elizabeth II	Harold Macmillan	Carlos P. Garcia	
Sir John Addis	1963	1970	Elizabeth II	Harold Macmillan; Alec Douglas-Home; Harold Wilson	Diosdado Macapagal; Ferdinand Marcos	
Sir John Curle	1970	1972	Elizabeth II	Harold Wilson; Edward Heath	Ferdinand Marcos	
James Turpin	1972	1976	Elizabeth II	Harold Wilson; Edward Heath	Ferdinand Marcos	
Sir William Bentley	1976	1981	Elizabeth II	Harold Wilson; James Callaghan; Margaret Thatcher	Ferdinand Marcos	
Michael Morgan	1981	1985	Elizabeth II	Margaret Thatcher; John Major	Ferdinand Marcos	
Robin McLaren	1985	1987	Elizabeth II	Margaret Thatcher; John Major	Ferdinand Marcos; Corazon Aquino	
Keith MacInnes	1987	1992	Elizabeth II	Margaret Thatcher; John Major	Corazon Aquino	
Alan Montgomery	1992	1995	Elizabeth II	John Major	Fidel V. Ramos; Joseph Estrada	
Adrian Thorpe	1995	1998	Elizabeth II	John Major	Fidel V. Ramos; Joseph Estrada	
Alan Collins	1998	2002	Elizabeth II	Tony Blair	Joseph Estrada; Gloria Macapagal Arroyo	
Paul Dimond	2002	2004	Elizabeth II	Tony Blair	Gloria Macapagal Arroyo	
Peter Beckingham	2004	2009	Elizabeth II	Tony Blair; Gordon Brown	Gloria Macapagal Arroyo	
Stephen Lillie	2009	2013	Elizabeth II	Gordon Brown; David Cameron; Theresa May	Gloria Macapagal Arroyo	
Asif Ahmad	2013	2017	Elizabeth II	Gordon Brown; David Cameron; Theresa May	Benigno Aquino III; Rodrigo Duterte	
Daniel Pruce	2017	2021	Elizabeth II	Theresa May; Boris Johnson; Liz Truss; Rishi Sunak; Keir Starmer	Rodrigo Duterte; Bongbong Marcos	Credentials were presented to Pres. Rodrigo Duterte on 13 September 2017.
Laure Beaufils	2021	2025	Elizabeth II; Charles III	Theresa May; Boris Johnson; Liz Truss; Rishi Sunak; Keir Starmer	Rodrigo Duterte; Bongbong Marcos	Credentials were presented to Pres. Rodrigo Duterte on 20 October 2021.
Dame Sarah Hulton	2025	present	Charles III	Keir Starmer; Andy Burnham	Bongbong Marcos	Credentials were presented to Pres. Ferdinand R. Marcos Jr. on 14 October 2025.

== See also ==
- Philippines–United Kingdom relations
- List of ambassadors of the Philippines to the United Kingdom
- Foreign relations of the Philippines
- Foreign relations of the United Kingdom
