= Katie Scott =

British art historian (born 1958)

Rachael Katherine Hannah Scott, Lady Deuchar, FBA (born 25 February 1958), is a British art historian, who was Professor in the History of Art at the Courtauld Institute of Art (2014–23).

== Life ==
She was born in 1958 in New York City, the daughter of diplomat Sir Peter Scott and Rachael née Lloyd Jones.

Educated at Cheltenham Ladies' College, Scott went up to University College London, graduating as BA then PhD, before pursuing further studies at Christ's College, Cambridge (MA, 1985).

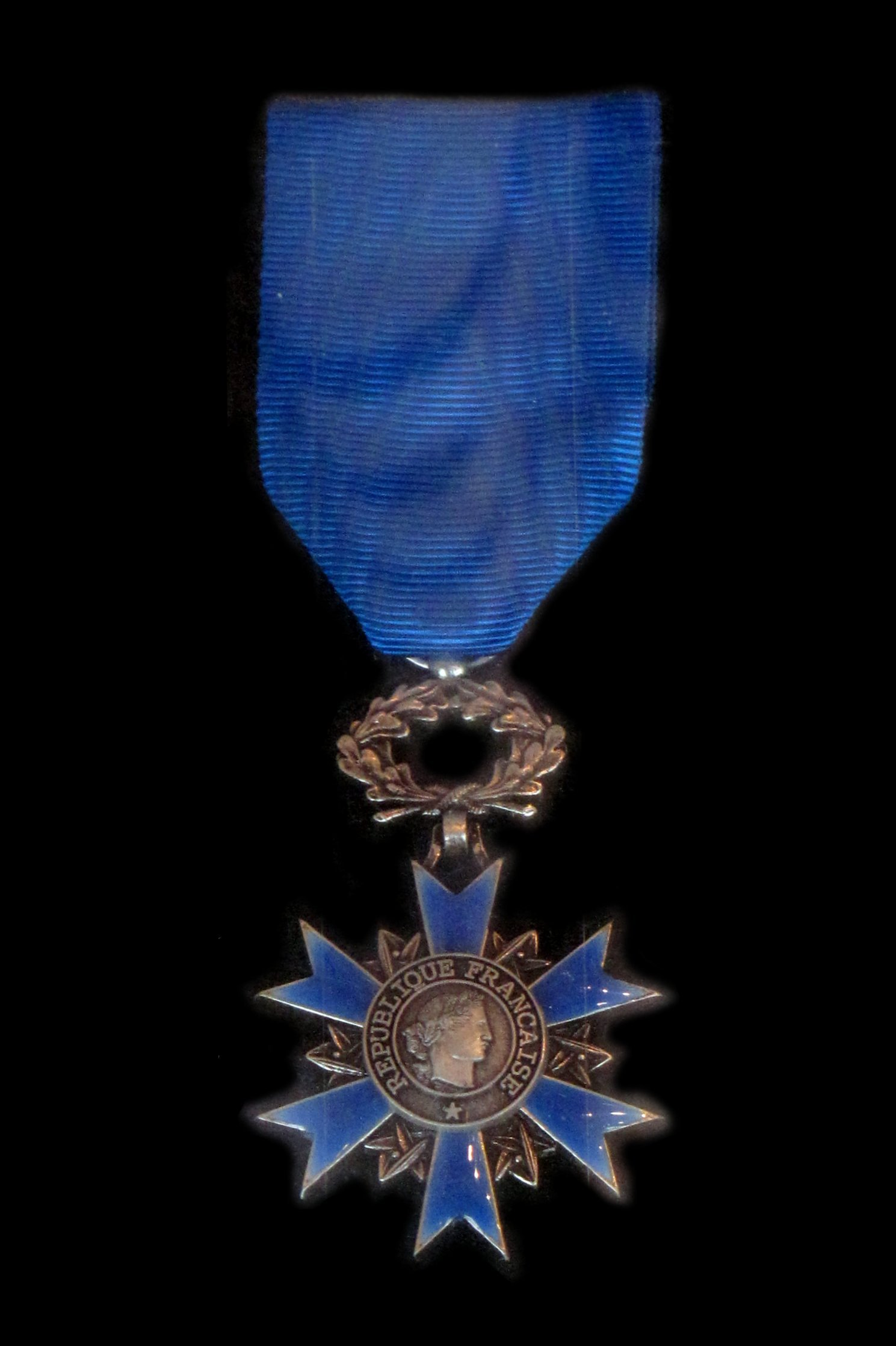
Ordre national du Mérite insignia

== Honours ==
- Fellow of the British Academy, 2019;
- Ordre national du Mérite (Chevalier), 2023

== Family ==
In 1982, she married Stephen Deuchar (knighted 2021), having one son and three daughters.

Sir Stephen and Lady Deuchar live in Kent.
