= Robin Barnett =

British diplomat (born 1958)

Robin Anthony Barnett CMG
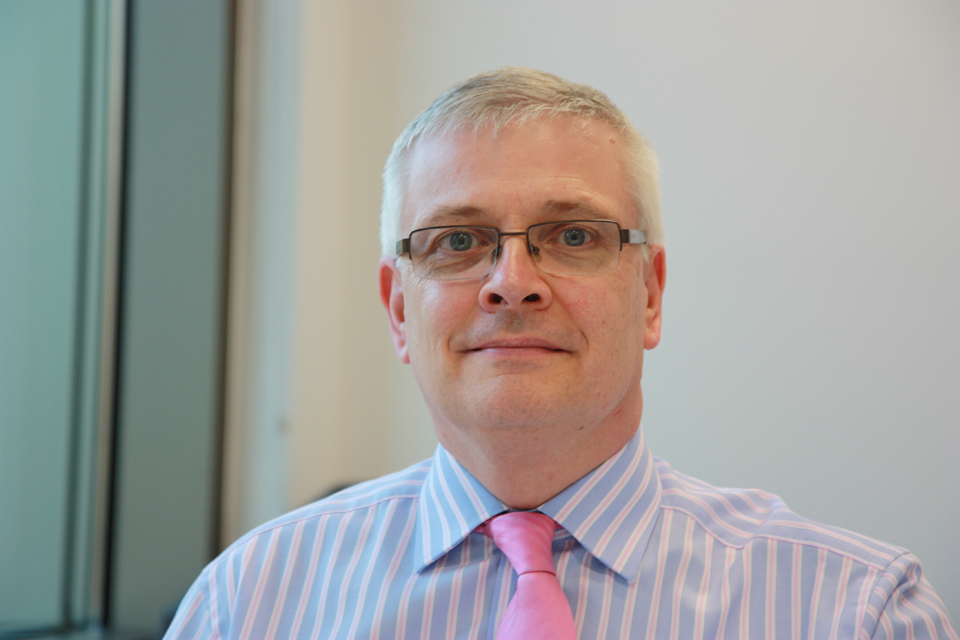

British Ambassador to Ireland
- In office August 2016 – September 2020
- Monarch: Elizabeth II
- Prime Minister: Theresa May; Boris Johnson
- Preceded by: Dominick Chilcott
- Succeeded by: Paul Johnston

British Ambassador to Poland
- In office 2011–2016
- Monarch: Elizabeth II
- Prime Minister: David Cameron
- Preceded by: Ric Todd
- Succeeded by: Jonathan Knott

Personal details
- Born: 8 March 1958 (age 68)
- Education: University of Birmingham

Robin Anthony Barnett CMG (born 8 March 1958) is a British diplomat, who served as the British ambassador to Ireland, Poland, and Romania.

== Early life ==
Robin Anthony Barnett was born on 8 March 1958 to Bryan Anderson Barnett and Marion Barnett.

Barnett attended the University of Birmingham, graduating with a Bachelor of Laws in 1979.

== Career ==
Barnett joined the Foreign and Commonwealth Office in 1980.

=== Ambassador to Romania ===
Barnett was appointed the British Ambassador to Romania in 2006, and served in this role until 2010.

=== Ambassador to Poland ===
Barnett served as the British Ambassador to Poland from 2011 to 2016.

=== Ambassador to Ireland ===
He succeeded Dominick Chilcott as Ambassador to Ireland in 2016.

== Personal life ==
Barnett married his first wife, Debra Marianne Bunt, in 1989. The marriage was dissolved in 1999.

Barnett married his second wife, Tesca Marie Osman, in 1999.

Barnett has a son and a stepson.

He is a supporter of Manchester United. Barnett had a framed Manchester United jersey, signed by Roy Keane, on his office wall during his time as ambassador to Ireland.

== Honours ==
He was appointed Companion of the Order of St Michael and St George (CMG) in the 2006 New Year Honours list.

Diplomatic posts
Preceded by Ric Todd	British Ambassador to Poland; 2011–2016	Succeeded by Jonathan Knott
Preceded by Dominick Chilcott	British Ambassador to Ireland; 2016–2020	Succeeded by Paul Johnston
