= Stephen Deuchar =

British arts charity executive

Sir Stephen John Deuchar CBE DL (born 11 March 1957) is a British arts administrator, and was director of the UK's Art Fund from 2010 to 2020.

He was born 11 March 1957, son of Rev. John Deuchar and Nancy Dorothea Deuchar (née Jenkyns). He was educated at Dulwich College, and earned a BA degree in history from the University of Southampton in 1979, and a PhD in Art History from Westfield College (Hampstead, London) in 1986.

Deuchar was the first director of Tate Britain in London, from 1998 to 2010. In 2010, he became director of the UK's Art Fund. he stood down on 31 March 2020. He is currently a Trustee of: the British Council; Royal Museums Greenwich; The Creative Foundation, Folkestone; and Turner Contemporary, Margate.

Deuchar was awarded an honorary D.Litt. degree from his alma mater, the University of Southampton, in 2010.

He was appointed Commander of the Order of the British Empire (CBE) in the 2010 Birthday Honours for services to the arts and was knighted in the 2021 New Year Honours, also for services to the arts. He is a Deputy Lieutenant for the County of Kent.

In 1982, he married Prof Katie Scott, and they have one son, and three daughters.
