= JPMorgan American Investment Trust =

British investment trust focussed on North America

- Type: Public company
- Traded as: LSE: JAM; FTSE 250 Index component
- ISIN: GB00BKZGVH64
- Industry: Investment trust
- Founded: 1881; 145 years ago
- Headquarters: 25 Bank Street, Canary Wharf, London, England
- Key people: Robert Talbut (Chairman)

JP Morgan American Investment Trust (LSE: JAM) is a large British investment trust dedicated to investments in North America. Originally established in 1881, the company has been listed on the London Stock Exchange since 1955 and is a constituent of the FTSE 250 Index. The chairman is Robert Talbut.

== History ==
The company was established as the Sterling Trust in 1881. Following the appointment of Robert Fleming & Co. was as manager, it became the Fleming American Investment Trust in 1982. After Robert Fleming & Co. was acquired by Chase Manhattan in April 2000, and Chase Manhattan merged with J.P. Morgan & Co. in December 2000, it was brought under the management of J.P. Morgan & Co. It went on to be the JPMorgan Fleming American Investment Trust in 2002 and then, following JPMorgan's decision to drop the Fleming brand, adopted its current name in 2006.
