= Peter Beckingham =

British retired diplomat

His Excellency Peter Beckingham
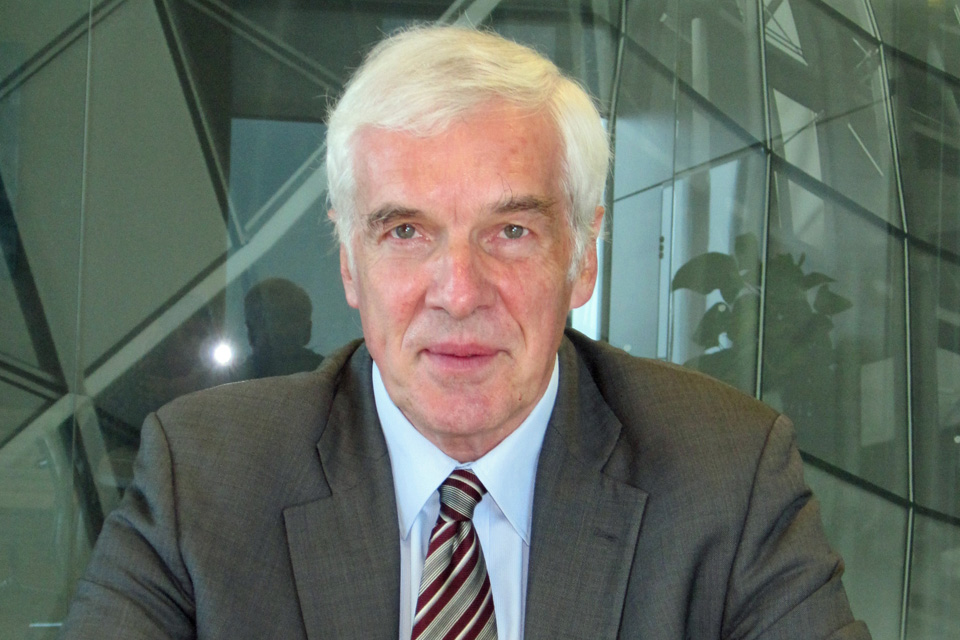

Governor of the Turks and Caicos Islands
- In office 9 October 2013 – 16 October 2016
- Premier: Rufus Ewing
- Preceded by: Ric Todd
- Succeeded by: John Freeman

Personal details
- Born: 13 March 1949 (age 77) Essex, England
- Spouse: Jill Mary Beckingham
- Education: Selwyn College, Cambridge

Peter Beckingham (born 13 March 1949) is a British retired diplomat, who was Governor of the Turks and Caicos Islands 2013–2016.

== Career ==
Beckingham was born in Essex in 1949, and was educated at Chigwell School and Selwyn College, Cambridge. In 1966, he received a scholarship from the Nuffield Foundation to teach in Zambia. In 1970, he joined Argo Records, a division of Decca Records. In 1974, he worked for the international trade mission, the British Overseas Trade Board, then British Information Services in New York from 1979. In 1984, he joined the Foreign and Commonwealth Office (FCO) in the news department for the 10th G7 summit in London, and then went on to work for the Energy, Science and Space Department, as head of the East African Department, and as head of sections in Sweden and Australia.

From 2005 to 2009, Beckingham was British Ambassador to the Philippines. In 2010, he became Deputy High Commissioner to India.

In October 2013, he succeeded Ric Todd as Governor of the Turks and Caicos Islands. In June 2016 the FCO announced that he was to be replaced in October 2016 and was to retire from the Diplomatic Service.

== Publications ==
- Beckingham, Peter, South Downs Showcase - 200 Years of Creativity around Lodsworth, Petworth and Midhurst, Lodsworth Heritage Society, 2021 ISBN 978-1-3999-0626-5

Diplomatic posts
Preceded by Paul Dimond	Ambassador of the United Kingdom to the Philippines; 2005–2009	Succeeded by Stephen Lillie
Government offices
Preceded by Ric Todd	Governor of the Turks and Caicos Islands; 2013–2016	Succeeded by John Freeman
