= James Dauris =

British diplomat

His Excellency James Dauris
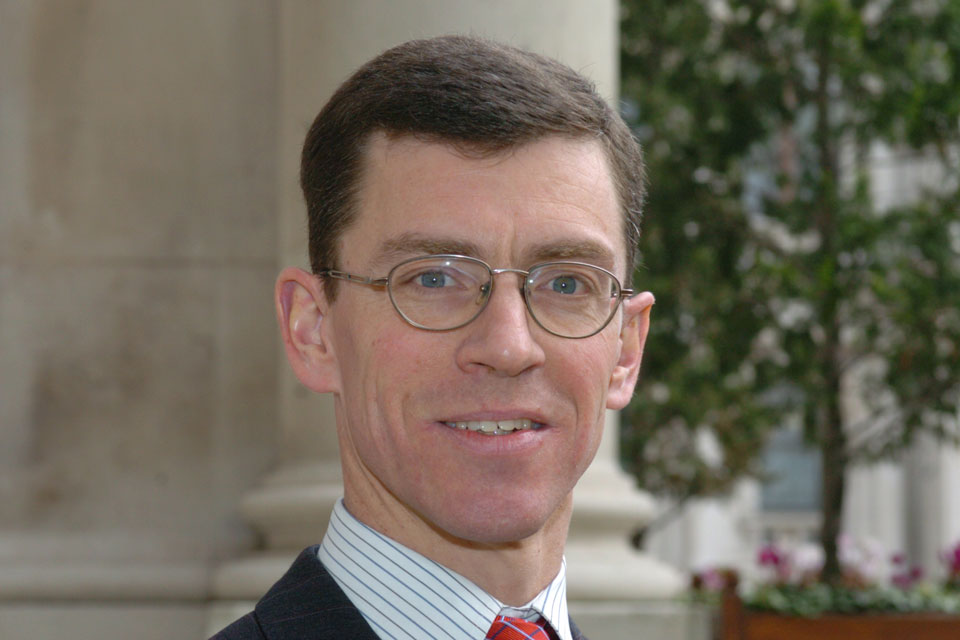

British Ambassador to Panama
- In office 2024–2025
- Monarch: Charles III
- Preceded by: Tim Stew
- Succeeded by: Greg Houston

12th High Commissioner of the United Kingdom to Sri Lanka and the Maldives
- In office 2015–2019
- Monarch: Elizabeth II
- Preceded by: John Rankin
- Succeeded by: Sarah Hulton

16th British Ambassador to Peru
- In office 2010–2014
- Monarch: Elizabeth II
- Preceded by: Catherine Nettleton
- Succeeded by: Anwar Choudhury

Personal details
- Born: United Kingdom
- Spouse: Helen Dauris
- Children: 3

James Edward Dauris (born 1966) is a British diplomat, most recently British Ambassador to Panama from March 2024 until July 2025. He was previously the ambassador of the United Kingdom to Peru and as the High Commissioner of the UK to Sri Lanka and the Maldives.

== Career ==
Dauris was schooled at Haileybury. He graduated from the University of Cambridge with a degree in Law After university he trained to be a Solicitor and worked for Ashurst Morris Crisp from 1991.

Dauris changed careers and joined the Foreign and Commonwealth Office in 1995. For his first overseas posting he was First Secretary (Commercial) at the British Embassy in Moscow. He served as a Deputy Head of Mission in Colombia from 2005 to 2009. He then served as Ambassador to Peru between 2010 and 2014. In April 2015, he was appointed as the new High Commissioner to Sri Lanka until August 2019 and Sarah Hulton was formally appointed during April 2019, prior to the 2019 Easter Sunday bombings, replacing him from August 2019.

In March 2024, the Foreign Office announced Dauris's appointment as British ambassador to Panama that month, to succeed Tim Stew.

== Comment ==
During the 2018 Sri Lankan constitutional crisis, the Professionals' National Front (PNF), a minority political party, requested him to stay away from involving in internal affairs of the state unnecessarily without instancing any such involvement.

== Personal life ==
He is married to Helen Dauris and the couple have three daughters.

Diplomatic posts
Preceded by Catherine Nettleton	British Ambassador to Peru; 2010-2014	Succeeded by Anwar Choudhury
Preceded by John Rankin	British High Commissioner to Sri Lanka and the Maldives; 2015–2019	Succeeded by Sarah Hulton
Preceded by Tim Stew	British Ambassador to Panama; 2024–	Incumbent
