= Philippines–United Kingdom relations =

Bilateral relations between the Philippines and the United Kingdom

- Philippines: United Kingdom

Diplomatic mission
- Embassy of the Philippines, London: Embassy of the United Kingdom, Manila

Envoy
- Ambassador Teodoro Locsin Jr.: Ambassador Sarah Hulton

Philippines–United Kingdom relations (Filipino: Ugnayang Pilipinas at Reyno Unido ng Dakilang Britanya at Hilagang Irlanda) are the bilateral relations between the Republic of the Philippines and the United Kingdom of Great Britain and Northern Ireland. Formal diplomatic relations were established between the two countries on 4 July 1946. Relations between the two countries are cordial.

== Philippine pre-independence ==
Relations between the Philippines and the United Kingdom date to Sir Francis Drake's arrival in Mindanao in 1579 after an almost three-year circumnavigational voyage aboard Golden Hind. Economic ties defined relations for the next four centuries. The Philippines became a part of the footprint of the East India Company. British companies took part in improving transportation infrastructure in the Philippines.

=== British occupation of Manila ===
The Kingdom of Great Britain occupied the city of Manila and the nearby port of Cavite between 1762 and 1764. Strong resistance from the provisional Spanish colonial government established by members of the Royal Audience of Manila and their Filipino allies prevented British forces from taking control of territory beyond the neighbouring towns of Manila and Cavite. The occupation was ended as part of the peace settlement of the Seven Years' War.

== Modern era ==
On 16 September 1953, British Envoy Extraordinary and Minister Plenipotentiary Frank S. Gibbs called at Malacañang to President Elpidio Quirino to give the message of the newly crowned monarch, Queen Elizabeth II, thanking the President for sending a personal representative for her coronation. Elizabeth II also gave her best wishes for the continued progress of the country.

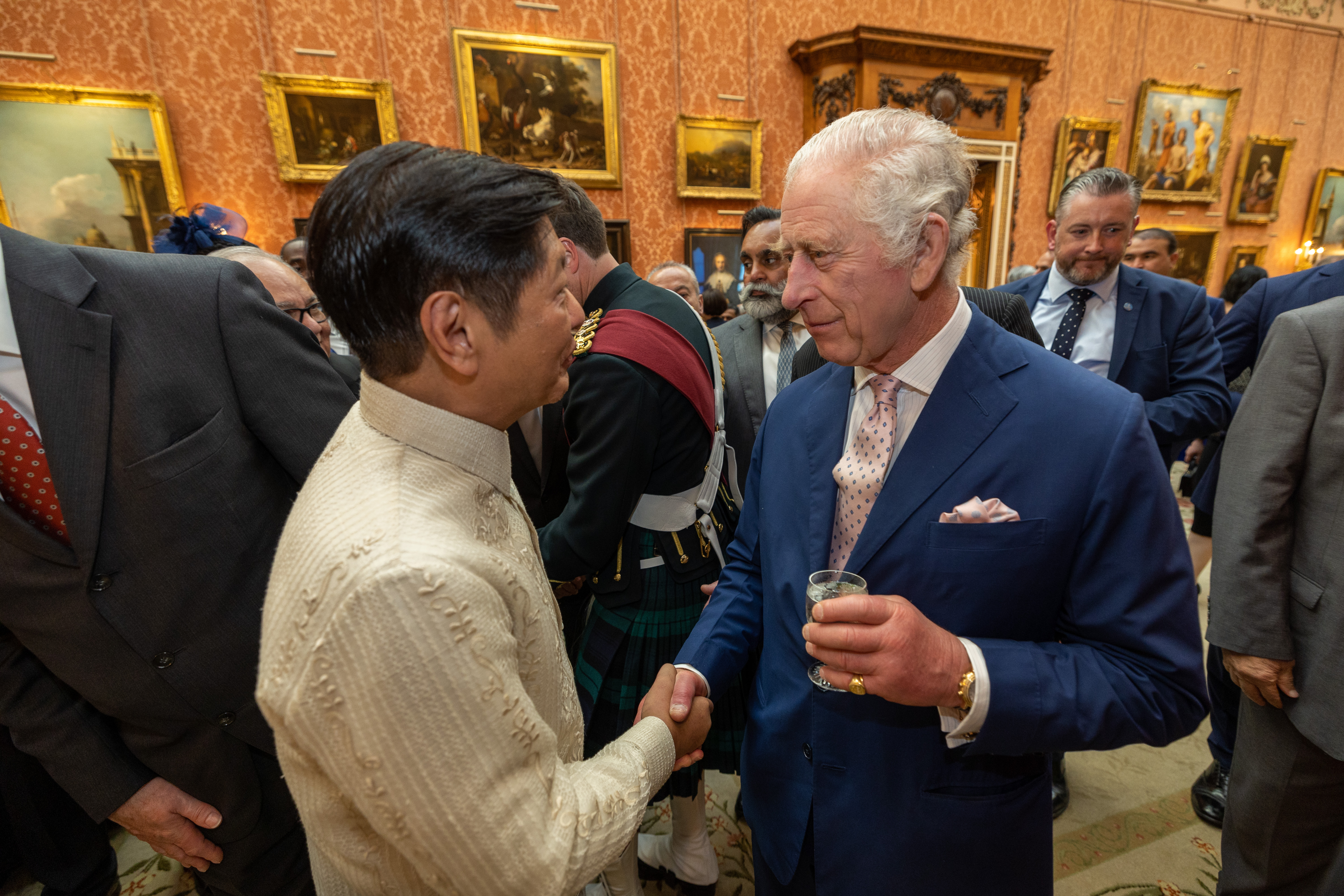
President Bongbong Marcos meets with King Charles III at Buckingham Palace the day before the latter's coronation, 5 May 2023

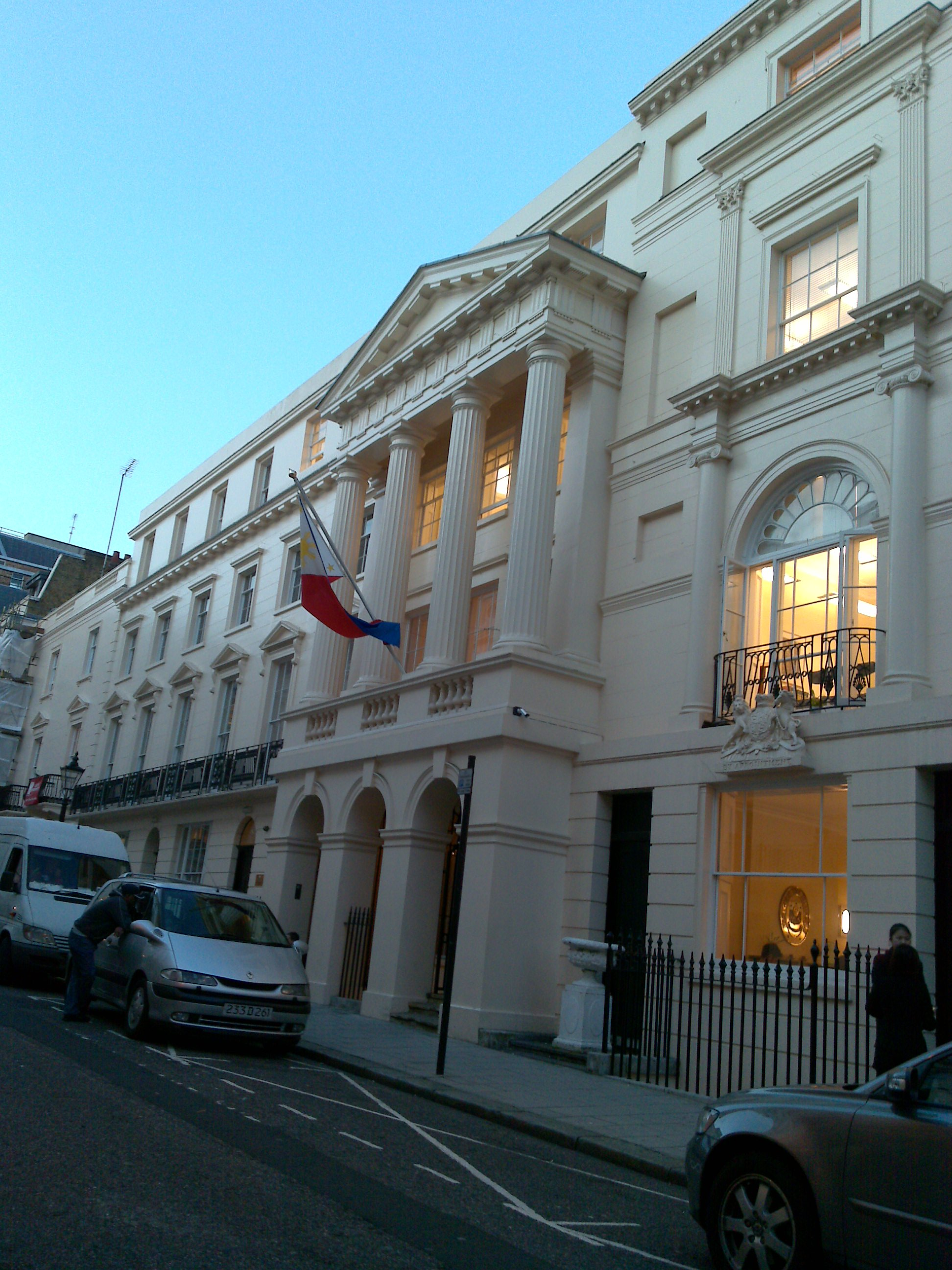
Philippine Embassy in Central London.

Four members of the British royal family are known to have visited the Philippines. In 1980, Princess Margaret, Countess of Snowdon visited the country. In 1997, after the handover of Hong Kong, Charles, Prince of Wales, made an official visit and met with President Fidel V. Ramos at Malacañang Palace. In 1999, Anne, Princess Royal, visited the Philippines to visit the British School Manila in Parañaque. In 2001, Prince Andrew, Duke of York visited the Philippines to attend the inauguration of the British School Manila, upon its relocation from Parañaque to Bonifacio Global City, Taguig. Prince Andrew, Duke of York revisited the British School Manila in 2004. On 19 March 2015, Anne, Princess Royal visited the school in Taguig.

The British Parliament's Foreign Affairs Committee visited the Philippines in 1986 to express support for the new government of then-President Corazon Aquino. British Foreign Secretary Sir Geoffrey Howe visited in 1988 in an attempt to further strengthen bilateral relations. The following year, Filipino Foreign Secretary Raul Manglapus became the first Philippine official to visit Britain. In 2016, British Foreign Secretary Philip Hammond visited the Philippines to mark the 70th anniversary of Philippines–United Kingdom diplomatic relations. In 2023, British Foreign Secretary James Cleverly visited the Philippines to discuss enhancing the bilateral "enhanced partnership" in accordance with the Rishi Sunak administration's Integrated Review Refresh.

=== Economic relations ===
The United Kingdom is currently the largest European investor in the Philippines. Likewise, most European tourists who visit the Philippines come from the United Kingdom, with about 90,000 visitors yearly.

The UK government spends in the region of £2 million per year of funding to facilitate scientific collaboration with the Philippines. The fund, administered through the British Embassy Manila, is to foster science and innovation partnerships for joint research on development topics, training and fellowships, and innovation capacity-building programmes. These joint projects tackle priority development concerns such as environmental resilience, food, and energy security, and health.

Former British Ambassador Asif Ahmad said: "Science and technology are key drivers to economic development. The Newton Fund will engage British and Filipino scientists as partners to increase their research and innovation capacity. The application of knowledge, tailored to the needs of the people of the Philippines, will address their current priorities and address long-term sustainable growth. The British invention of the internet transformed lives and it is not beyond reason to hope that Filipino-UK ingenuity could unlock further discovery."

In 2020, as part of the UK Government's Future Cities Program, it signed a memorandum of understanding with the Bases Conversion and Development Authority (BCDA) to design the New Clark City Central Park and an affordable housing project in the new metropolis. Under the MOU, the UK and BCDA will work on three key areas for New Clark City: (1) Participative Design for New Clark City Central Park and citywide public space recommendations; (2) Housing Strategy and Livelihood Recommendations for Clark Special Economic and Freeport Zone and New Clark City; and (3) the Establishment of a Sustainability Unit for New Clark City.

=== Military relations ===
The Philippines sided with the Allies in the Second World War together with Great Britain. The United Kingdom plays an important part in the Mindanao peace process.

On 4 December 2017, the "Memorandum of Understanding on Defense Cooperation between the Philippines and the UK" was signed by the Philippine government and this opened up possibilities for exchange of training and cooperation between the forces of the two countries as well as the cyber security relations.

=== Disaster relief operations ===
Typhoon Haiyan, known as Yolanda in the Philippines, was one of the deadliest natural disasters in the country's history and was one of the most powerful typhoons ever recorded.

The UK provided £77m of humanitarian aid, making it the largest single donor. In addition to the UK government's response, the British public donated a further £85m through the Disasters Emergency Committee (DEC) appeal.

=== COVID-19 pandemic efforts ===
On 4 August 2021, the UK donated 415,040 Oxford–AstraZeneca COVID-19 vaccine doses to the Philippine government as part of their vaccination drive. On 25 November 2021, a total of 3,191,040 doses of UK-donated AstraZeneca vaccines arrived in the country, in partnership with the UNICEF and World Health Organization (WHO).

== Agreements ==
The Philippines and the United Kingdom have bilateral agreements that were signed and put into force or ratified:

- An agreement on air services between the PH and the UK (signed and entered into force on 31 January 1955).
- An agreement on double taxation avoidance and prevention of fiscal evasion in relation to income taxes and income (signed on 10 June 1976 and entered into force on 23 January 1978).
- An agreement for investment protection and promotion (signed on 3 December 1980, entered into force on 2 January 1981).
- A memorandum of understanding for investment protection and promotion (signed and entered into force on 17 December 1985)
- PH-UK Agreement on Certain Commercial Debts (signed and entered into force 4 February 1986)
- Social Security Agreement (signed on 27 February 1985 and entered into force on 1 December 1989)
- PH-UK Small Islands Electrification Grant 1990 (signed and entered into force on 10 December 1990)
- PH-UK Manila Airport Security Equipment Grant 1994 (signed and entered into force on 31 January 1995)
- Concessional Financing Agreements (signed and entered into force on 1 September 1995)
- A memorandum of understanding on Women's and Children's Protection Course between the government of Britain and the Philippine National Police (signed and entered into force on 30 August 1997)
- An agreement on recruitment (signed on 8 January 2002)
- A memorandum of agreement on Advance Education/Training Program for Filipino Caregivers (signed and entered into force on 5 March 2005)
- A memorandum of understanding on Healthcare Cooperation (signed 30 July 2003 and entered into force 6 January 2006)
- Treaty on Mutual Legal Assistance in Criminal Matters (signed on 18 September 2009 and entered into force on 1 June 2012)
- Extradition Treaty between the Philippines and the United Kingdom (signed 18 September 2009 and ratified on 14 April 2014)
- Philippines-UK Joint Plan of Action (signed and entered into force 13 November 2009)
- A memorandum of understanding between the defense cooperation of the Philippines and the UK (signed 4 December 2017).
- Joint Economic Action Plan between the PH and the UK (signed on 22 March 2019).

== Bibliography ==
- Heald, Tim (2007), Princess Margaret: A Life Unravelled, London: Weidenfeld and Nicolson, ISBN 978-0-297-84820-2
