= George Woodward (diplomat) =

British diplomat

George Woodward (c.1698 – 10 November 1735) was a British diplomat to Poland during the early 18th century.

He was appointed Resident to Poland in 1728, when August II's poor health raised the question of succession to the Polish crown. Arriving in Dresden in 1729, he remained at Warsaw or Dresden until 1731. After returning to Britain he was sent to Poland once more in 1732, as Envoy Extraordinary. He died at Warsaw in his 38th year, and was buried in the churchyard at Hillesden, Buckinghamshire.
