= Peter Scott (diplomat) =

British diplomat

Sir (Charles) Peter Scott KBE CMG (30 December 1917 – 16 January 2002), was a British diplomat, who served as Ambassador to Norway from 1975 to 1977.

== Career ==
Related to the Earls of Eldon, the elder son of the Revd John Scott, he was educated at Weymouth College, before going up to Pembroke College, Cambridge.

After joining the Indian Civil Service, Scott served with British Information Services in NY, the FCO in Tokyo, Paris, Vienna as well as Rome, the UN in Geneva, becoming HM Ambassador to Oslo.

Scott then entered royal service as Private Secretary (1978–79) and Treasurer (1979–81) to Prince Michael of Kent.

== Honours ==
- CMG, 1964
- KBE, 1978
  - OBE, 1948

== Family ==
In 1954, he married Rachael, younger daughter of Cyril Lloyd Jones CIE.

Sir Peter and Lady Scott had one son and two daughters, including the art historian Katie Scott (now Lady Deuchar).
