= George Clutton =

British diplomat (1909–1970)

Clutton in 1960

Sir George Lisle Clutton KCMG FSA (1909–1970), was a British diplomat who became British Ambassador to both the Philippines and Poland.

== Biography ==
Born on 5 March 1909, George Clutton was educated at Bedford School and Merton College, Oxford. Between 1934 and 1939 he worked at the British Museum. He joined the Foreign and Commonwealth Office in 1940. Between 1944 and 1946 he worked at the British Embassy in Stockholm, between 1946 and 1948 he was First Secretary at the British Embassy in Belgrade, and between 1948 and 1950 he headed the African Department at the Foreign Office. Between 1950 and 1952 he was Minister at the UK Liaison Mission to Japan.

Between 1952 and 1955 Clutton was the Foreign Office liaison officer with MI6. It was during this period that he coordinated Anglo-American cooperation in the 1953 Iranian coup d'état. Between 1955 and 1959, Clutton was British Ambassador to the Philippines and, between 1960 and 1966, he was British Ambassador to Poland.

Sir George Clutton died on 9 September 1970.

Diplomatic posts
Preceded by Frank Stannard Gibbs	British Ambassador to the Philippines; 1955–1959	Succeeded by John Arthur Pilcher
Preceded by Sir Eric Berthoud	British Ambassador to Poland; 1960–1966	Succeeded by Sir Thomas Brimelow
