= Sarah Hulton =

British diplomat

Her Excellency Sarah Hulton OBE
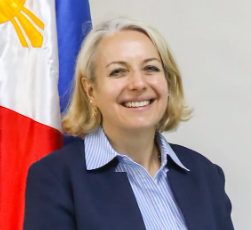
- Hulton in 2026

British Ambassador to the Philippines and Ambassador to Palau
- Incumbent
- Assumed office September 2025
- Monarch: Charles III
- Prime Minister: Keir Starmer; Andy Burnham
- Preceded by: Laure Beaufils

United Kingdom High Commissioner to Sri Lanka and the Maldives
- In office August 2019 – June 2023
- Monarchs: Elizabeth II; Charles III
- Prime Minister: Boris Johnson; Liz Truss
- Preceded by: James Dauris
- Succeeded by: Andrew Patrick

Personal details
- Spouse: Anthony Hulton
- Children: 3

Sarah Anne Pascale Hulton OBE is a British diplomat who has served as the British ambassador to the Philippines and non-resident ambassador to Palau since September 2025.

She previously served as the High Commissioner of the United Kingdom to Sri Lanka and the Maldives from 2019 to 2023.

Hulton was appointed Officer of the Order of the British Empire in 2019 for her services to British foreign policy, an award which is given for prominent national or regional achievements in the UK.

== Career ==
Hulton has been a career diplomat for the British government since 2002 when she joined the Foreign and Commonwealth Office (FCO). She held various roles at FCO, among them as Counter Terrorism Desk Officer, Head of Child Abduction Unit, Head of Weapons of Mass Destruction Controls, Head of the Pacific Department, Head of DPRK Department and as Deputy Director for Human Resources before her appointment as British High Commissioner for Sri Lanka and the Maldives in 2019. She returned to FCO (now known as Foreign, Commonwealth and Development Office or FCDO) in 2023 where she was appointed as Interim Director for Overseas Territories and Polar Directorate since 2024.

Since September 2025, Hulton has served as the UK Ambassador for the Philippines and non-resident Ambassador to the Republic of Palau. Hulton can speak Tagalog, also known as Filipino, having received full-time training on the language when she worked at the Foreign Commonwealth Office (FCO) from 2004 to 2005. In a meeting with Sara Duterte, the Vice President was impressed by Hulton's proficiency in Filipino.

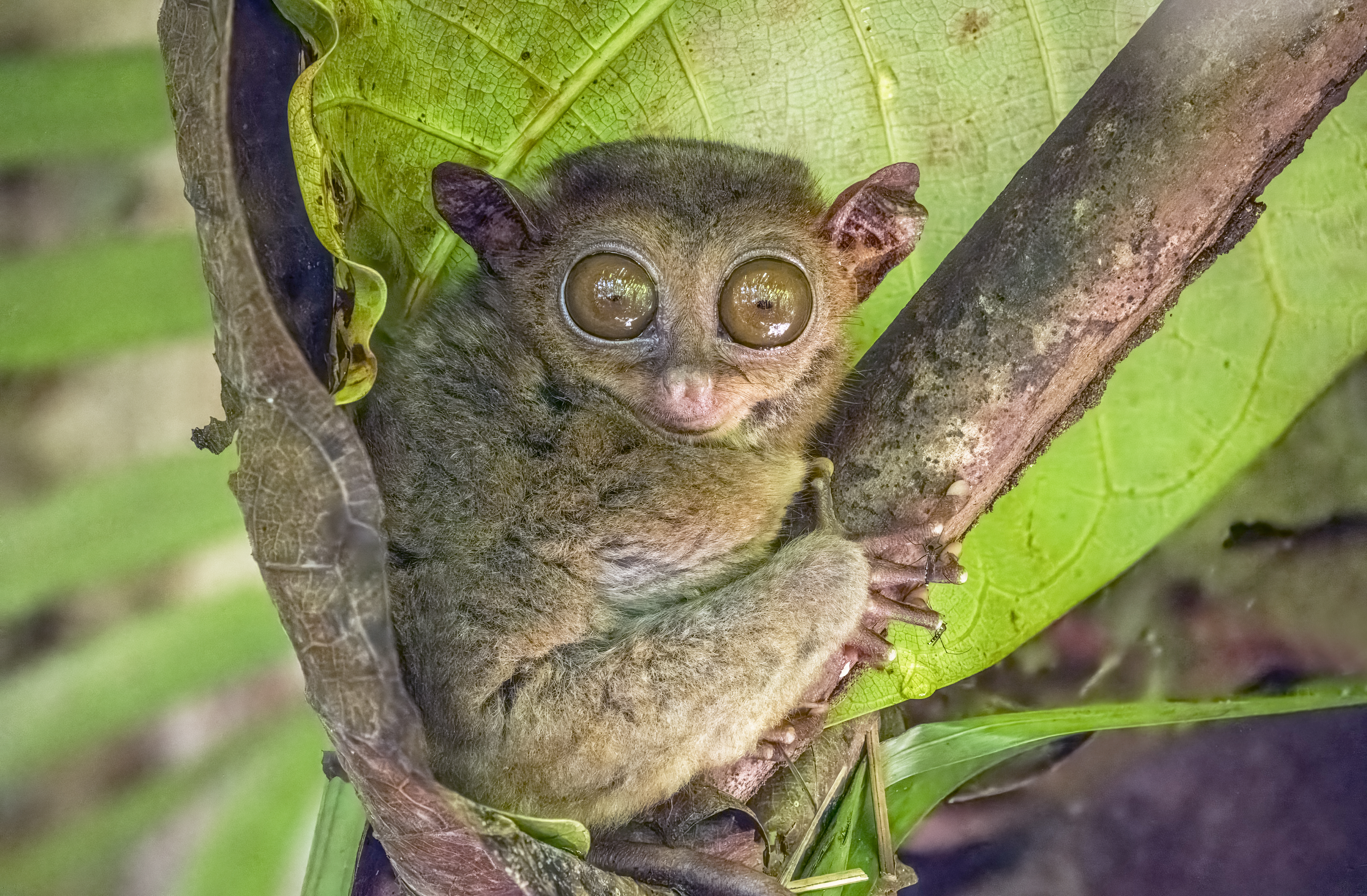
King Charles III has a special interest in the preservation of the Philippine tarsier (Carlito syrichta)

Hulton attended a celebration of the 80th anniversary of diplomatic relations between The United Kingdom and the Philippines, and is working with local authorities and charities in Bohol on trade issues and conservation of the tarsier, of which King Charles III has a special interest.

Diplomatic posts
Preceded by Laure Beaufils	British Ambassador to the Philippines; 2025–present	Succeeded by Incumbent
Preceded by James Dauris	British High Commissioner to Sri Lanka and the Maldives; 2019–2023	Succeeded by Andrew Patrick
