= United Kingdom in NATO =

United Kingdom–NATO relations
- NATO: United Kingdom

The United Kingdom has been a member of the North Atlantic Treaty Organization (NATO) since its inception in 1949.

== History ==
Winston Churchill, after the Labour Party came to power in UK as a result of the early elections on 5 July 1945, proclaims an Atlantic course that fully meets their requirements. Since at this time Great Britain needed financial assistance from the USA, a political union with this country could simplify the negotiations on which the future of the British economy depended. The Labour themselves were quite calm about the prospect of such an alliance. Starting from 1946, the government of Clement Attlee fundamentally sided with the policy of Atlantic solidarity, which makes them, together with the American administration of Truman, the initiators of the Cold War.

Given the United Kingdom's significant political and military role within NATO, its contributions have often been substantial but, during the NATO's 1999 Kosovo War, the Royal Air Force deployed Tornado and Harrier aircraft in the bombing campaign over Yugoslavia.

Since it began in 2001 British troops were part of the NATO-led mission in Afghanistan, ISAF.

In March 2011, the British Forces participated in NATO-led UN missions in Libya.

=== Finnish and Swedish NATO accession bids ===
In July 2022, the United Kingdom fully approved Finland and Sweden's application for NATO membership.

=== Defence ===
The first overseas meeting Prime Minister Keir Starmer attended as prime minister was the 2024 NATO summit held in Washington from 9 to 11 July 2024. On the flight to the summit, Starmer laid out a "cast iron" commitment to increase defence spending to the NATO target of 2.5 per cent of GDP in line with the NATO target, following a "root and branch" review of British armed forces.

On 25 February 2025, Starmer announced that the previous government's commitment to reaching 2.5% of GDP spending on defence by 2030 would be brought forward to April 2027. This would be funded by reducing the official development assistance budget from 0.5% to 0.3%. George Robertson, a former Secretary General of NATO and Labour politician, led the 2025 Strategic Defence Review to guide the future increased spending, with Starmer commenting that the UK was moving to "war-fighting readiness" and that "everything we do will add to the strength of NATO".

In June 2025, Starmer announced the purchase of F-35A aircraft capable of deploying US nuclear weapons as part of NATO's dual capable aircraft nuclear mission, which his office said would be "the biggest strengthening of the UK's nuclear posture in a generation". He pledged to boost overall UK defence and security spending to 5% of economic output by 2035 to meet a NATO target. Keir Starmer has announced that the UK will send 350 advanced air defence missiles to Ukraine, funded for the first time by £70m in interest from frozen Russian assets, with the missiles rapidly adapted for ground launch and delivered via UK-supplied Raven systems. Additionally, he announced the UK's decision to purchase 12 F-35A jets which are expected to carry US atomic bombs—expanding UK nuclear capability to include airborne delivery systems.

The Defence Investment Plan to implement the review was expected to be issued in autumn 2025. However this was delayed amid warnings that there was a £28 billion funding gap for shortfalls on previous commitments. The Public Accounts Committee reported that the delay was undermining the UK's credibility with NATO allies and confidence within the defence industrial base. On 11 June 2026, just before the planned Defence Investment Plan publication, Defence Secretary John Healey and his junior minister Al Carns resigned citing disagreement with the very limited spending increase given in the plan.

The Defence Investment Plan was announced by Starmer on 30 June 2026, after he had announced his resignation as prime minister and Leader of the Labour Party. The plan increased spending by about £1.5 billion over the previous draft, though funding for all the spending was not initially allocated.

== United Kingdom's foreign relations with NATO member states ==
- Albania
- Belgium
- Bulgaria
- Canada
- Croatia
- Czech Republic
- Denmark
- Estonia
- Finland
- France
- Germany
- Greece
- Hungary
- Iceland
- Italy
- Latvia
- Lithuania
- Luxembourg
- Montenegro
- Netherlands
- North Macedonia
- Norway
- Poland
- Portugal
- Romania
- Slovakia
- Slovenia
- Spain
- Sweden
- Turkey
- United States

== See also ==
- Foreign relations of the United Kingdom
- Foreign relations of NATO
