= Diplomatic Academy =

Diplomatic Academy may refer to:

- Diplomatic Academy (Czech Republic)
- Diplomatic Academy (United Kingdom)
- Diplomatic Academy of London (defunct)
- Diplomatic Academy of the Ministry of Foreign Affairs of the Russian Federation
- Diplomatic Academy of Vienna
- Diplomatic Academy of Vietnam
