= Andrew Dalgleish =

Andrew Dalgleish may refer to:

- Andrew Dalgleish (diplomat) (born 1975), British diplomat
- Andrew Dalgleish (trader) (1853–1888), Scottish trader
