= List of diplomats of the United Kingdom to the OSCE =

The head of the UK delegation to the OSCE is the senior member of the United Kingdom's delegation to the Organization for Security and Co-operation in Europe.

This list includes heads of delegation to the predecessor organisation, the Conference on Security and Co-operation in Europe (CSCE), some of whom were also heads of delegation to the conventional arms control negotiations under the auspices of the CSCE that led to the 1990 Treaty on Conventional Armed Forces in Europe.

The UK delegation to the OSCE is housed in the British embassy in Vienna. The head of the delegation usually holds the personal rank of ambassador.

== Heads of delegation ==
- 1980–1982: William Wilberforce
- 1986–1988: Laurence O'Keeffe
- 1989–1990: Michael Edes
- 1990–1992: Paul Lever
- 1992–1993: Terence Wood
- 1993–1999: Simon Fuller
- 1999–2003: John de Fonblanque
- 2003–2007: Colin Munro
- 2007–2011: Ian Cliff
- 2011–2015: Dominic Schroeder
- 2015–2019: Sian MacLeod
- 2019–2023: Neil Bush
- 2023–present: Neil Holland
