= Ian Cliff =

Retired British diplomat

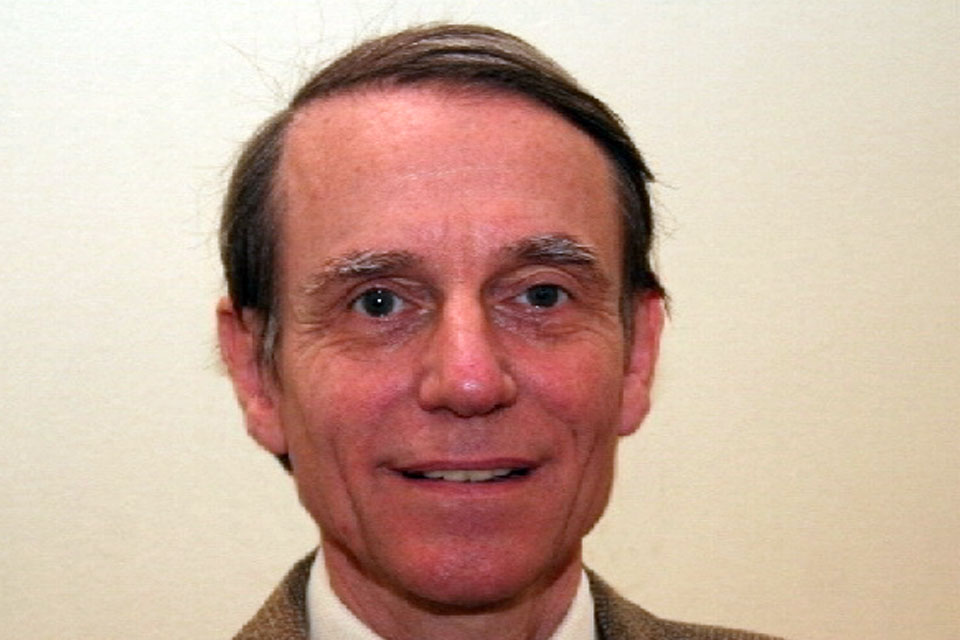
Ian Cliff

Ian Cameron Cliff CMG OBE (born 11 September 1952) is a British diplomat who has been Ambassador to Bosnia and Herzegovina, the Sudan, the OSCE and Kosovo, as well as Chargé d'Affaires in Croatia.

== Career ==
Ian Cliff is the son of Gerald Shaw Cliff, who was Resident Engineer Trinity House 1925–65. Cliff was educated at Hampton Grammar School and Magdalen College, Oxford where he gained a degree in Modern History. He taught History for four years at Dr Challoner's Grammar School, Amersham, before joining the Diplomatic Service in 1979. After Arabic language training at St Andrews University and in Damascus he served at Khartoum and in Middle East-related posts in the Foreign and Commonwealth Office. In 1989 he became 1st Secretary in the UK Mission to the United Nations in New York and in 1996 Deputy Head of Mission in the British Embassy to Austria. He was then appointed Ambassador to Bosnia and Herzegovina 2001–05, Ambassador to the Sudan 2005–07, Head of the UK Delegation to the OSCE in Vienna (with personal rank of Ambassador) 2007–11, and Ambassador to Kosovo 2011–2015. In May 2015 he was appointed to be Chargé d'Affaires to Croatia for a year.

As Ambassador in Sarajevo he was a member of the Peace Implementation Council Steering Board and supported High Representative Lord Ashdown in building up the state institutions of Bosnia and Herzegovina. In the Sudan he was a member of the Assessment and Evaluation Commission charged with monitoring the implementation of Sudan's Comprehensive Peace Agreement.

Cliff is a railway enthusiast and a member of the Midland and Great Northern Joint Railway Society which supports the operation of the North Norfolk Railway between Sheringham and Holt. He was noted driving industrial steam locomotives in Bosnia and the Pristina to Peja passenger train in Kosovo.

He is married to Caroline Cliff, who was also a member of the Diplomatic Service until retirement in 2022, and they have three children, born 1989, 1993 and 2001.

Cliff retired from the Diplomatic Service in 2016 but continued to work for the Foreign and Commonwealth Office as Principal Research Analyst, Western Balkans until 2022. He has given evidence on the Western Balkans to the House of Commons Foreign Affairs Committee and to the House of Lords International Relations Committee.

In 1991, while he was in New York, Ian Cliff was appointed Officer of the Order of the British Empire (OBE). He was appointed Companion of the Order of St Michael and St George (CMG) in the 2017 New Year Honours.

Diplomatic posts
Preceded by Graham Hand	Ambassador to Bosnia and Herzegovina; 2001–2005	Succeeded by Matthew Rycroft
Preceded by Sir William Patey	Ambassador to Sudan; 2005–2007	Succeeded by Dame Rosalind Marsden
Preceded by Colin Munro	Head of UK Delegation to the OSCE; 2007–2011	Succeeded by Dominic Schroeder
Preceded by Andrew Sparkes	Ambassador to Kosovo; 2011–2015	Succeeded by Ruairí O’Connell
Preceded by David Slinn	Chargé d'Affaires to Croatia; 2015–2016	Succeeded by Andrew Dalgleish
