= Emma Hopkins =

Emma Hopkins may refer to:

- Emma Curtis Hopkins (1849–1925), American spiritual author and leader
- Emma Hopkins (diplomat), British diplomat
