= Sian MacLeod =

British diplomat

Sian MacLeod OBE
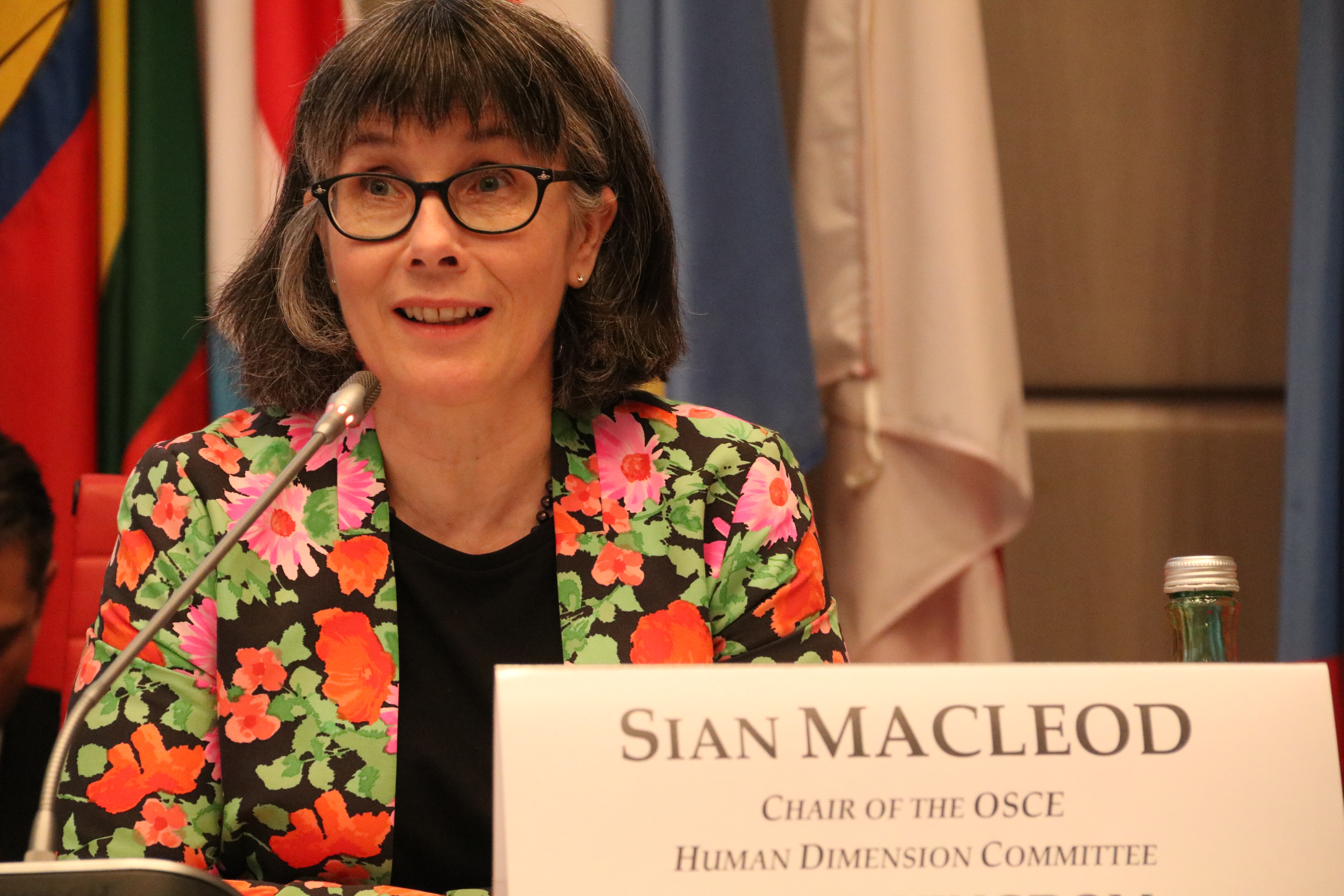

British Ambassador to Serbia
- In office 2019–2023
- Monarchs: Elizabeth II; Charles III
- Prime Minister: Boris Johnson; Liz Truss; Rishi Sunak; Keir Starmer
- Preceded by: Denis Keefe
- Succeeded by: Edward Ferguson

British Ambassador to the Czech Republic
- In office 2009–2013
- Monarch: Elizabeth II
- Prime Minister: Gordon Brown; David Cameron
- Preceded by: Linda Duffield
- Succeeded by: Jan Thompson

Personal details
- Born: Sian Christina MacLeod; 31 May 1962 (age 63)
- Education: Royal Academy of Music (BMus)

Sian Christina MacLeod OBE (born 31 May 1962) is a British diplomat who was formerly head of the UK delegation to the Organization for Security and Co-operation in Europe (OSCE) in Vienna. Her last diplomatic posting was as the British Ambassador to Serbia (2019-2023).

== Career ==
MacLeod graduated from the Royal Academy of Music with a BMus degree in 1983. She joined the Foreign and Commonwealth Office (FCO) in 1986 and served in Moscow 1988–92. After the collapse of the Soviet Union she served briefly as deputy head of mission in Vilnius, Lithuania, in 1992. She then returned to the FCO until she was posted to The Hague 1996–2000. She was sent back to Moscow 2004–07, first as political counsellor and then as minister and deputy head of mission. She was ambassador to the Czech Republic 2009–13 and was appointed to be head of the UK delegation to the OSCE in 2015 (with the rank of ambassador). In January 2019 she was appointed to be ambassador to the Republic of Serbia from summer 2019 MacLeod was succeeded by Edward Ferguson who took up his post in July 2023.

MacLeod was appointed OBE in 2002 "in recognition of services in support of operations in Afghanistan during the period 1st October 2001 to 31st March 2002".

Diplomatic posts
Preceded by Linda Duffield	British Ambassador to the Czech Republic; 2009–2013	Succeeded by Jan Thompson
Preceded by Dominic Schroeder	Head of the UK delegation to the OSCE; 2015–2019	Succeeded by Neil Bush
Preceded by Denis Keefe	British Ambassador to Serbia; 2019–2023	Succeeded by Edward Ferguson
