= Macedonians in the United Kingdom =

Total population
- 2,983 Macedonian-born (2011 census)

Regions with significant populations
- Greater London

Languages
- British English and Macedonian

Religion
- Macedonian Orthodox Church, Macedonian diaspora

Macedonians in the United Kingdom (Macedonian: Македонци во Велика Британија, romanized: Makedonci vo Velika Britanija) refers to people from North Macedonia that have formed communities in or were born in the United Kingdom. The 2011 UK Census recorded a total of 2,983 residents who stated that their country of birth was North Macedonia.

== History of Macedonians in the United Kingdom ==
The majority of Macedonians in Britain arrived after the Socialist Federal Republic of Yugoslavia permitted emigration to the West in the 1960s and 1970s. Many Macedonians especially from the Demir Hisar, Bitola and Prilep regions left for Britain during this period. During the 1980s many professionals left Skopje to work in London for the Socialist Republic of Macedonia and for international organisations stationed there. Following the Breakup of Yugoslavia hundreds of ethnic Macedonians left for Britain. After the Yugoslav Wars in the 1990s many ethnic Macedonians and Albanians from the newly independent Republic of Macedonia left for Britain as refugees.

The 2001 UK Census recorded 1,285 people born in Macedonia. The 2011 UK Census recorded 2,882 Macedonian-born residents in England, 32 in Wales, 56 in Scotland, and 13 in Northern Ireland.

== Organisations ==
Within the United Kingdom many ethnic Macedonian based organisations have been founded. Most notable is the "Association of Macedonians in the United Kingdom" (Macedonian: Асоцијација на Македонци во Обинето Кралство, romanized: Asociasija na Makedoncite vo Obinetoto Kralstvo). This group has been key in organising events amongst the ethnic Macedonian community in Britain. They have also contributed to the consecration of the Macedonian Orthodox Church in London along with the Embassy of the Republic of Macedonia in London.

The most prominent Cultural and Artistic society within the ethnic Macedonians community in the United Kingdom is the ethnic Macedonian Cultural and Artistic Association "Sonce". It was founded in London on 17 November 2003.

== Macedonian Orthodox Church ==
The Macedonian Orthodox Church "St. Archangel Michael & All Angels", was founded by immigrants from Macedonia in 1993. At first it organised liturgy only once a year for Easter, but in 2007 a resident priest was appointed. The following year, 2008, a chapel in Soho in London became the home of the Macedonian Orthodox Church and liturgies in Macedonian have been offered there at least once a month ever since. There have been plans to construct a Cultural Centre on the site of the Church.

In 2010 a Sunday church school for Macedonian was formed with a class of about 15 children. In 2014, three new classes opened, one in London, one in Littlehampton, and the third in Oxford.

== See also ==
- Macedonian diaspora
- Ethnic Macedonians
- North Macedonia–United Kingdom relations
- Bulgarians in the United Kingdom
- Greeks in the United Kingdom
- Serbs in the United Kingdom
