= Percentages agreement =

Informal agreement

Winston Churchill's copy of his secret agreement with Joseph Stalin

The Percentages agreement was a secret, informal political agreement between British Prime Minister Winston Churchill and Soviet leader Joseph Stalin agreed during the Fourth Moscow Conference, in October 1944. The Percentages agreement established the percentage-division of control over the countries of Eastern Europe into spheres of influence. Moreover, the Percentages agreement also is known as the Naughty document, because Churchill thought that the U.S. would reject a geopolitical agreement with greatly imperialist undertones, although U.S. President Franklin Roosevelt had been consulted and had tentatively agreed to the matter. In 1953, Churchill published the Percentages agreement in the final volume of his memoir, The Second World War.

== Churchill's Mediterranean strategy ==
During the Second World War, Winston Churchill became painfully aware that the UK had spent virtually all of its reserve capital on the war and was becoming economically dependent upon American support. He recognised that the Soviet Union would end up being much stronger than it was before the war, while Britain would be weaker. Fearing that the United States might return to isolationism after the war, leaving an economically weakened Britain to face the Soviet Union alone, he sought a preemptive agreement with Stalin that might stabilize the post-war world and tie the Soviets down in a way that was favourable to British interests. In this regard, Churchill was especially concerned about securing the Mediterranean within the British sphere of influence, making it clear that he did not want Communists to come to power in Italy, Greece, and Yugoslavia as he believed that Communist governments in those countries would allow the Soviet Union to establish air and naval bases in those nations, which would threaten British shipping in the Mediterranean.

The Suez Canal and the Mediterranean Sea were key shipping routes between Britain and its colonies in Asia, especially India, together with the Dominions of Australia and New Zealand. It was also the main route that tankers used to carry oil from the Middle East to Britain. Because of the Suez Canal, Churchill and other British officials intended to keep Egypt in the British sphere of influence by continuing to occupy the Suez Canal, which was envisioned in Britain as being permanent. For Churchill, British control of the Suez Canal required British control of the Mediterranean and the Red Sea. Losing control of either would cancel out the advantage of control of the Suez Canal. Thus, for Churchill, it was critical to ensure that the nations on the Mediterranean sea lanes, like Italy and Greece, were in the British sphere of influence after the war. Inconveniently for Churchill, during the war Italy, Greece, and Yugoslavia all had very large and growing Communist parties, and the most effective anti-Axis resistance fighters in those countries were also communist.

Churchill appreciated that the Soviet Union for much of WW2 had been doing most of the fighting against the Wehrmacht. At the same time, he advocated an Anglo-American "Mediterranean strategy" to strike at the supposed "soft underbelly" of the Axis and advance into Eastern Europe, as much to block the Red Army from advancing westward as to win the war. Churchill's Mediterranean strategy, which he supported for political reasons more than military ones, caused much tension with the Americans, who preferred to fight and defeat the Wehrmacht in northwest Europe. British policy after June 1941 was to support the Soviet Union as a Soviet defeat would free the majority of the Wehrmacht to fight in the west. At the same time, Churchill had hopes that the war would end with the Red Army being more or less still within the 1941 borders of the Soviet Union with the Allies liberating the rest of Europe. Churchill, together with other British leaders, believed that Britain could not afford heavy losses in fighting against the Germans, and the fact that the Red Army was doing the bulk of the fighting, inflicting heavy losses on the Germans while taking even more heavy losses itself, was a source of quiet satisfaction for him.

Churchill's Mediterranean strategy called for the Allies to take control of North Africa, and then to invade Southern Italy, which in turn would be used as a base for invading the Balkans. It was described by the historian David Carlton as a strategy largely based upon Churchill's anti-communist ideology as he wished to place the Allied armies as far into Eastern Europe as possible to block the Red Army from moving west. Carlton also noted the contradiction in Churchill's grand strategy that called for the Soviet Union to do the bulk of the fighting and take the heaviest losses while at the same time he assumed that Britain would be able to step in when the time was right to stop the Red Army from moving west. Carlton noted that the Red Army did most of the fighting which also allowed the Red Army to seize most of Eastern Europe in 1944–45.

== Eastern Europe ==
As a corollary to his "Mediterranean strategy", Churchill supported plans for a post-war federation of Austria and Hungary as a way to limit Soviet influence in Eastern Europe, favouring a magnanimous peace with the Hungarians. Churchill was notably reluctant to declare war on Hungary, and only did so under heavy Soviet pressure. In 1942, treaties had been signed by the governments in exile for a post-war federation uniting Yugoslavia and Greece, and another federation uniting Poland and Czechoslovakia; Churchill had hopes that the proposed Austro-Hungarian federation would serve as the link for an Eastern European super-state stretching from the Baltic to the Mediterranean that would place much of Eastern Europe in the Western sphere of influence.

The Hungarian prime minister Miklós Kállay was convinced by 1943 that the Axis powers were destined to lose the war, and his main interest was in ensuring that Hungary signed an armistice with Britain and the United States before the Red Army arrived in Hungary. Throughout 1943, Hungarian diplomats in Turkey were secretly in contact with British and American diplomats, telling them that their government no longer wished to be fighting with Germany. On 9 September 1943, aboard a yacht in the Sea of Marmara just outside of Istanbul, the British ambassador to Turkey, Sir Hughe Knatchbull-Hugessen secretly signed an armistice with the Hungarian diplomat László Veress under which Hungarian forces would surrender to British and American forces the moment they arrived in Hungary; significantly, the secret armistice was vague about whether it also applied to Soviet forces.

Though Kállay rejected the armistice when he learned that it included the Allied demand for unconditional surrender, on 10 September the Hungarian consul in Istanbul, Dezső Újvári, told Sir Ronald Hugh Campbell, the British ambassador in Lisbon that his government would abide by the terms of the secret armistice. The willingness of Hungary's ultra-conservative government which was dominated by the aristocracy and gentry to reach out to Britain, with the Anglophile Veress speaking much about his hopes for closer Anglo-Hungarian ties after the war, led to hopes that Hungary would be in the British sphere of influence in the post-war world.

Bulgaria was allied to Germany and had received Romanian, Greek, and Yugoslav territory in 1940–41. In December 1941, King Boris III of Bulgaria declared war on the United States and Great Britain but never declared on the Soviet Union, as the traditional Russophile feelings of the Bulgarian people for their fellow Slavs would have made declaring war too unpopular. In the European Advisory Commission which had the responsibility of drafting armistices with the Axis powers, the Soviet Union, as it was not at war with Bulgaria, was not involved while the United States had no interest in armistices with what were regarded as backward Balkan nations, like Bulgaria. The British thus found Bulgaria was their responsibility by default, and the possibility that the Soviet Union might declare war on Bulgaria never occurred to them, leading them to assume that Bulgaria would be in the British sphere of influence after the war by default.

Churchill's support for retaining the monarchies in both Italy and Greece as the best way to keep the Communists out of power after the war also caused tensions with the Americans, who objected to the behavior of King Victor Emmanuel III in Italy and King George II in Greece who had both supported fascist regimes and had discredited the Houses of Savoy and Glücksburg. In opposition to Churchill, who favoured not only retaining the monarchies in Italy and Greece but also keeping in power men who supported fascism such as Marshal Pietro Badoglio, Roosevelt was much more open to having Italy and Greece become republics after the war while preferring men of liberal and moderate left-wing positions as the future post-war leaders. However, the fact that no Soviet forces were fighting in Italy lessened Churchill's fears of the Italian Communist Party coming to power after the war. Knowing that the Red Army forces in Ukraine were very close to Romania, which suggested the Soviets would probably enter that nation first, in May 1944, the British Foreign Secretary Sir Anthony Eden met with Fedor Tarasovich Gusev, the Soviet ambassador to the court of St. James, to discuss an arrangement under which Greece would be in the British sphere of influence in exchange for Romania being in the Soviet sphere of influence.

Though Yugoslavia was not considered as important as Italy and Greece, Churchill had pressed in June 1944 for a coalition government that would see the Democratic Federal Yugoslavia provisional government proclaimed by Marshal Josip Broz Tito in 1943 unite with the Yugoslav government-in-exile based in London, headed by King Peter II. Churchill had hopes that he with the help of Stalin could persuade Tito to accept King Peter II, believing that retaining the House of Karađorđević would ensure Yugoslavia would remain at least partially in the British sphere of influence after the war. However, unlike Greece and Italy, which British ships using the Suez Canal route had to sail past, this was not the case with Yugoslavia, which therefore led Churchill to place less importance upon that nation.

Towards Greece, British policy as stated in an internal document was "our long-term policy towards Greece is to retain her in the British sphere of influence, and...a Russian-dominated Greece would not be by British strategy in the Eastern Mediterranean". Knowing that the main resistance force in Greece was the Communist-dominated EAM (Ethnikó Apeleftherotikó Metopes-National Liberation Front), British policy was to support EAM as a way to tie down German forces that might otherwise fight against the British, but at the same time to prevent EAM from coming to power and ensure that the Greek government-in-exile based in Cairo returned to Greece. Given the importance which Churchill attached to Greece, he very much wanted an agreement with Stalin under which Moscow would accept Greece as being within the British sphere of influence.

=== Churchill's appeal to Roosevelt ===
On 4 May 1944, Churchill asked his Foreign Secretary, Anthony Eden, the rhetorical question: "Are we going to acquiesce in the communisation of the Balkans and perhaps of Italy?" Churchill answered his question by saying that Britain must "resist the Communist infusion and invasion". The attempt to work spheres of influence for the Balkans led Gusev to ask if the Americans were included. Eden assured Gusev that the Americans would back the spheres of influence agreement, but when asked, the State Department firmly replied it was not the policy of the United States to make such agreements as that would violate the Atlantic Charter. Placed into a difficult position, Churchill appealed directly to Roosevelt. The British historian David Carlton recounts that

[Churchill told Franklin Roosevelt] on 31 May...that the proposed Anglo-Soviet arrangement applied only to war conditions and was not an attempt to carve up the Balkans. Roosevelt was unimpressed and on 11 June held that the result would be "the division of the Balkan region into spheres of influence despite the declared intention to limit the arrangement to military matters." Churchill then urged the President to consent to the arrangement being given a three-month trial. And on the 13th Roosevelt rather weakly gave way...This turned out to be a decision of great importance.

== The military situation, 1944 ==
=== Soviet advances ===
On 22 June 1944, the Red Army launched Operation Bagration and in the ensuing battle over the next 12 days destroyed German Army Group Center, taking out 21 divisions totaling about 300,000 men. The destruction of Army Group Center created a huge gaping hole in the German lines on the Eastern Front, and led to rapid Soviet advances. On 20 August 1944, the Red Army launched a major offensive into the Balkans and invaded Romania, whose oil was key to the German war effort. On 21 August 1944, Churchill's doctor, Lord Moran, wrote in his diary: "Winston never talks of Hitler these days. He is always harping on the dangers of Communism. He dreams of the Red Army spreading like a cancer from one country to another. It has become an obsession, and he seems to think of little else," going on to note that Churchill's response to the Soviet offensive into Romania was to exclaim: "Good God, the Russians are spreading across Europe like a tide." Though the German 8th and 6th Armies in Romania resisted fiercely, the Romanian Army, whose morale had been declining for some time, collapsed in the face of the Soviet combined arms offensive. The Red Army encircled the German 6th Army, of whom the men serving in its 18 divisions either surrendered or were killed, while the badly mauled 8th Army retreated into Hungary to hold the passes in the Carpathian mountains with the aim of blocking the Soviets from advancing into Hungary.

On 23 August 1944, King Michael of Romania dismissed his pro-German Prime Minister, Marshal Ion Antonescu, signed an armistice with the Soviets, and declared war on Hungary and Germany. King Michael hoped that having Romania switch sides might save the Romanian branch of the House of Hohenzollern from being replaced after the war with a Communist regime. The Wehrmacht, which had lost 380,000 men in the unsuccessful attempt to hold Romania over the course of two weeks in August 1944, now found its entire position in the Balkans imperilled.

Churchill had a fascination with the Balkans, which he saw as one of the most favourable places for operations. A recurring theme of his "Mediterranean Strategy" was his plan for the Allies to land on the Adriatic coast of Yugoslavia and advance through the Ljubljana Gap in the Alps to reach Austria in order to stake a post-war claim on Eastern Europe. The collapsing German position in the Balkans spurred Churchill's interest once again in his plans for the Ljubljana Gap, but landing in Dalmatia would require capturing north-east Italy first. On 25 August, the British 8th Army began Operation Olive, an offensive against the Gothic Line in northern Italy spearheaded by the 1st Canadian Corps with the aim of taking Pesaro and Rimini, which were to be used as ports to support the planned British offensive in Yugoslavia.

The stiff German resistance on the Gothic Line, which made the best use of the natural defensive terrain of north-eastern Italy that was crisscrossed by mountains and 14 rivers, led to the 8th Army advancing far more slowly than what had been hoped and led to the plans for the Ljubljana Gate being shelved. In Triumph and Tragedy, the last of his History of the Second World War books, Churchill attacked the Americans for Operation Dragoon, the invasion of southern France, to which he was opposed. As an expression of bitterness that the Americans opposed his Mediterranean strategy, Churchill claimed that if only the manpower and resources devoted to Operation Dragoon had been made available for plans to advance up the Ljubljana Gap, then the Allies would have taken Vienna in 1944 and thereby prevented the Red Army from capturing that city in 1945.

On 2 September 1944, Bulgaria renounced the alliance with the Reich and declared its neutrality. On 5 September 1944, the Soviet Union declared war on Bulgaria and the Red Army crossed the Danube into Bulgaria the same day. The Bulgarians promptly surrendered and on the same day as the Soviet Union invaded, Bulgaria switched sides and declared war on Germany. On 9 September, a Communist-led Fatherland Front took power in Bulgaria and on 15 September the Red Army entered Sofia. The Soviet occupation of Bulgaria placed the Red Army on the borders of Yugoslavia, Greece, and Turkey, all of which bordered the Mediterranean sea lanes that Churchill was determined to deny to the Soviets after the war.

At the Second Quebec Conference held between Roosevelt and Churchill in Quebec City between 12 and 16 September, Churchill and the rest of the British delegation spent much time talking about Bulgaria. During the same conference, Roosevelt once again rejected Churchill's plans for the Ljubljana Gap offensive, saying that the Balkans were not the decisive theater of war that Churchill kept saying that it was, and the Allies should focus on north-west Europe. At the conference, Field Marshal Alan Brooke, the chief of the Imperial General Staff, had to inform Churchill that the British Army had been stretched to the breaking point by the losses caused by the fighting in north-west Europe, Italy, and Burma, and only a skeleton force would be available for operations in the Balkans. Brooke advised Churchill that his plans for the British Army to occupy the Balkans together with Hungary were quite impossible to achieve at present without American participation.

The British were especially concerned about the possibility that Stalin might allow the Greater Bulgaria created in 1941 when the Germans assigned Vardar Macedonia together with much of Greek Thrace and Greek Macedonia to Bulgaria to continue after the war. The "greater Bulgaria" created in 1941 had given Bulgaria a coastline on the Aegean Sea, and most disturbing to the British, the Soviets were allowing the Bulgarians to stay in the parts of Greece and Yugoslavia that they had annexed under the grounds that Bulgaria was now a Soviet ally. Even more frightening to Churchill was the possibility the Red Army might turn south into Greece and liberate it, thereby presenting Britain with a fait accompli with EAM installed in power.

In a state of some desperation, Eden sent a cable on 21 September to Sir Archibald Clark Kerr, the ambassador in Moscow, asking him to say that he hoped "the Soviet Government would not find it necessary to send Russian troops into any part of Greece except in agreement with His Majesty's Government". After two anxious days of waiting for a Soviet reply, on 23 September, the Deputy Foreign Commissar, Andrey Vyshinsky, told Clark Kerr that the Soviet Union would honour the Eden–Gusev agreement of May 1944. Besides for Greece, Churchill pushed very strongly for Bulgaria to return to pre-1941 frontiers. Churchill was notably indifferent to reversing the 1940 Treaty of Craiova, which had given the Bulgarians the Southern Dobruja at the expense of Romania.

=== Autumn of 1944 ===
As the Soviets advanced into Bulgaria, the Red Army was also engaged in savage fighting on the Transylvanian passes in the Carpathian mountains leading into Hungary, but few doubted that it would be only a matter of time before the Soviets entered the Hungarian plain. On 21 September 1944, the Red Army took Arad, a Transylvanian city that was shortly occupied by the Hungarians, and panic broke out in Budapest. On 24 September 1944, the Regent of Hungary, Admiral Miklós Horthy, decided to open secret talks for an armistice with the Soviet Union, which he had resisted doing until then, sending Stalin a letter claiming that he was misinformed about the incident which led Hungary to become belligerent with the Soviet Union in 1941, and now accepted that the Soviets did not bomb the Hungarian town of Kassa.

Like King Michael, Admiral Horthy hoped that signing an armistice now might save Hungary from a Communist regime, and furthermore he wanted to keep the part of Transylvania that Hungary had received under the Second Vienna Award of 1940. On 6 October 1944, the Battle of Debrecen began as the Red Army broke out onto the Hungarian plain. The Red Army captured and then lost Debrecen, though the three Soviet corps that had been encircled by the German counterattack were able to escape. The Soviet drive to Budapest had been halted for the moment, but it was assumed that the Red Army would resume its advance.

At the same time that the Red Army was advancing into the Balkans and was battling its way into Hungary, the Western Allies found themselves stalemated on the Western Front as the hopes of Anglo-American generals to have the war over by Christmas were dashed by the vigorous resistance of the Wehrmacht. The widespread belief held by Anglo-American officers that the Normandy campaign had crippled the Wehrmacht in western Europe turned out to be mistaken as in what German historians call the "miracle of September," the Wehrmacht recovered from its defeat in Normandy and stopped the Allied advance.

To sustain their advance, the Allies needed a major port closer to their lines than Cherbourg and Marseilles. The deeper the Allies advanced into Europe, the longer their supply lines became while the German supply lines conversely became shorter, giving the Wehrmacht the advantage in the fighting. Though the Wehrmacht had after 1940 neglected the Westwall along the border with France, the logistical problems greatly hindered the Allied advance, and the hastily reactivated Westwall turned out to be a formidable defense line that delayed the Allies from entering the Rhineland. Even the U.S. 3rd Army, led by the famously aggressive General George Patton, had its advance in Lorraine slowed to what the American historian Gerhard Weinberg called a "crawl" by October.

The British had captured Antwerp, Europe's third-largest port, on 5 September 1944, but Antwerp was useless to the Allies as long as the Germans occupied the mouth of the river Scheldt, which connected Antwerp to the North Sea. The decision of Field Marshal Bernard Montgomery to focus on Operation Market Garden, an attempt to outflank the Westwall, which ended in the defeat of the Anglo-Polish paratroopers at the Battle of Arnhem, rather than on clearing the Scheldt, allowed German forces to dig in and deny the Allies use of Antwerp. The Germans had mined the Scheldt, which required minesweepers to remove the mines, which in turn required the eviction of the German forces occupying the banks of the river. As a result, a largely Canadian force had to fight the difficult and bloody Battle of the Scheldt in October–November 1944 to make it possible for minesweepers to clear the Scheldt. As long as Antwerp remained closed to the Allies, there was no possibility of the Allies making any major advances into the Reich in the autumn of 1944. Only on 28 November 1944, after the minesweepers had cleared the Scheldt, could the Allies begin to use Antwerp. This in turn placed Stalin in a relatively favourable position in regards to negotiating power with the Allies.

With the Red Army now deep in the Balkans, Adolf Hitler decided that Greece was untenable and he ordered his forces to pull out of Greece to head into Yugoslavia before they were cut off by the Red Army. On 4 October 1944, the 3rd Ukrainian Front under Marshal Fyodor Tolbukhin together with Tito's Yugoslav Partisans took Belgrade. The fact that the Soviets did not follow up taking Belgrade with an offensive onto the Adriatic Sea, instead heading up the Danube river valley towards Budapest, allowed the German Army Group E under Alexander Löhr to escape from Greece. On 4 October 1944, the British III Corps under General Ronald Scobie landed in Greece. On 10 October 1944, the Germans began to pull out of Greece.

On 15 October 1944, Horthy signed an armistice with the Soviet Union, but Hitler had anticipated this move and made preparations to keep Hungary a battlefield regardless of what the Hungarians thought. The fact that Horthy insisted that his honour as a Hungarian officer and gentleman required him to tell Hitler that he was going to sign an armistice with the Soviets certainly ended any doubt in Hitler's mind about what he was going to do. The same day that Horthy signed the armistice, German forces took control of Hungary, deposed Horthy and imposed a new government led by Ferenc Szálasi of the Hungarist Arrow Cross Party. As the Germans had pulled out of Greece, EAM had taken over and the British found as they landed that EAM had control of most of Greece.

== The agreement ==
Countries	Soviet percentages	Western world percentages
Bulgaria	75% → 80%	25% → 20%
Greece	10%	90%
Hungary	50% → 80%	50% → 20%
Romania	90% → 100%	10% → 0%
Yugoslavia	50%	50%

The Anglo-Soviet summit in Moscow that began on 9 October 1944 was largely provoked by the Bulgarian issue, especially the possibility of a "greater Bulgaria" after the war in the Soviet sphere of influence together with the possibility that all of the Balkans together with Hungary might be occupied by the Red Army soon. Roosevelt, after studiously ignoring the Balkans for most of the war, had now started to take an interest in the region. In October 1944, Roosevelt was fully engaged in his reelection campaign as he sought a fourth term, making it impossible for him to attend the Moscow summit as he would like. In a telegraph to Stalin on 4 October, Roosevelt expressed his regret that his reelection campaign kept him from attending, but that "in this global war there is literally no question, political or military, in which the United States is not interested". Roosevelt asked that the American ambassador to the Soviet Union, W. Averell Harriman, be allowed to attend the summit as his observer, which was politely refused under the grounds that Harriman could only attend as Roosevelt's representative.

Winston Churchill proposed the agreement, under which the UK and USSR agreed to divide Europe into spheres of influence, with one country having "predominance" in one sphere, and the other country having "predominance" in another sphere. At least part of the reason for the agreement was Churchill still nourished hopes that the British would be able to land in Yugoslavia and advance through the Ljubljana Gap, which would require co-operation with the Red Army who already entered Yugoslavia. Furthermore, Churchill's interest in keeping EAM out of power made him keen to persuade Stalin, whose support for EAM had been mostly rhetorical so far, to abandon EAM as he did not wish for disagreements about Greece to become the occasion for an Anglo-Soviet clash of interests in the Balkans. In the British transcript of the conversations, Churchill's main fear was that the already imminent prospect of civil war in Greece might be the cause of an Anglo-Soviet war with the Soviets backing EAM and the British backing the king.

After discussing Poland, Churchill told Stalin Romania was "very much a Russian affair" and the Soviet-Romanian armistice was "reasonable and showed much statecraft in the interests of general peace in the future." Churchill then stated that "Britain must be the leading Mediterranean power", which required having Greece in the British sphere of influence. Stalin expressed some sympathy for the British who for much of World War II have been unable to use the Mediterranean because of the danger of naval and air attacks from Axis forces based in Italy, forcing the British to supply their forces in Egypt via the long route around the Cape of Good Hope. An agreement was soon reached with Greece and Romania, but Bulgaria, Yugoslavia and Hungary turned to be more difficult.

According to Churchill's account of the incident, Churchill suggested that the Soviet Union should have 90 percent influence in Romania and 75 percent in Bulgaria; the United Kingdom should have 90 percent in Greece; and they should have 50 percent each in Hungary and Yugoslavia. Churchill wrote it on a piece of paper which he pushed across to Stalin, who ticked it off and passed it back. The result of these discussions was that the percentages of Soviet influence in Bulgaria and, more significantly, Hungary were amended to 80 percent and Romania to 100 percent. Churchill called it a "naughty document".

=== Other issues discussed in October 1944 ===
After discussing the Balkans, Churchill and Stalin turned towards the proposed United Nations, with Churchill ceding to Stalin's demand that the great powers should have the right to vote on and veto territorial disputes involving themselves, giving the example of how China, supported by the United States, was demanding the return of Hong Kong after the war, which Churchill regarded as an outrageous request. As the United States had refused to recognize the Soviet territorial gains of 1939–40, Churchill's message was clear here, namely that there was a quid pro quo that the United Kingdom would support the Soviet Union regaining the frontiers of 1941 in exchange for the Soviet support for Britain to retake its Asian colonies that had been lost to Japan, which the United States was opposed to. Churchill had been irked by the American support for China's claim to be a great power and was attempting to secure Soviet support against the Sino-American campaign for greater power to China. Once the topic returned to the Balkans, Stalin objected to the British demand for influence in Bulgaria, and soon it turned out that the real issue was Turkey.

Accordingly, to the British transcript, Stalin was quoted as saying: "if Britain were interested in the Mediterranean, then Russia was equally interested in the Black Sea". Stalin claimed that the Montreux convention of 1936 which governed the Turkish Straits was biased against the Soviet Union and needed to be revised. Stalin maintained that if Britain had the right to control the Suez Canal regardless of what the Egyptians felt and likewise the United States had the right to control the Panama canal regardless of what the Panamanians felt, then so too did the Soviet Union have the right to control the Turkish straits regardless of what the Turks felt. Though Churchill appeared sympathetic for Stalin's claim for the Soviet Union having "the right and moral claim for free passage" through the Turkish straits, he argued that it would take "gradual pressure" to persuade the Turks to accept it. Churchill secured a promise from Stalin that the Red Army would not enter Greece, and then asked Stalin to "soft-peddle the Communists in Italy and not to stir them up", saying he wanted to let "pure democracy" decide whatever Italy remained a monarchy or become a republic. Stalin replied that

...it was difficult to influence Italian Communists. The position of Communists differed in different countries. It depended upon their national situation. If Ercoli [Palmiro Togliatti, secretary-general of the Communist party of Italy] were in Moscow Marshal Stalin might influence him. But he was in Italy, where the circumstances were different. He could send Marshal Stalin to the devil. Ercoli could say he was an Italian and tell Marshal Stalin to mind his own business...However, Ercoli was a wise man, not an extremist, and would not start an adventure in Italy.

Harriman did not attend the Churchill-Stalin summit in Moscow but he did his best to keep Roosevelt informed about what was being discussed, though notably he never mentioned anything about percentages. The information Harriman provided to his childhood friend Roosevelt about the Anglo-Soviet summit was generally accurate, though there was much about the Churchill-Stalin talks that he did not know about. For the next several months, Roosevelt was ignorant of the full contents of the Moscow summit and the percentages agreement.

== Disagreement over Bulgaria ==
After discussing Italy, the conversation once again turned towards Bulgaria, which Stalin claimed that the Bulgarian Communists were being restrained from their radicalism by the Red Army. Stalin argued that the Soviets did not intend to use Bulgaria as a base to threaten Turkey, and objected to any British role in Bulgaria, which led Eden to reply that Britain was entitled to a "small share" after having been at war with Bulgaria for three years. Bulgaria turned out to be the main difficulty during the meeting on 10 October between Eden and Molotov with Eden accusing the Bulgarians of mistreating British officers in Greek Thrace and wanted the Soviet Union to order them to treat British officers with respect, leading Molotov in a rare moment of wit to say the Soviets had just promised not to interfere in Greek internal affairs. The main point soon turned to be the armistice with Bulgaria. The armistices the Soviet Union had just signed with Romania and Finland gave power to an Allied Control Commission (ACC) which was to operate "under the general direction and orders" of the Soviet high command, in effect giving the Soviets the main say in those nations.

The American draft for the armistice with Bulgaria stated that the ACC for Bulgaria was to be responsible to the governments of the "Big Three" powers, and which Britain had agreed to accept. Molotov wanted Eden to abandon British support for the American draft, and accept the Soviet draft, which was almost identical to the Finnish and Romanian armistices. Eden refused to cede, which caused Molotov to bark that Bulgaria bordered the Black Sea, and if the Soviets were willing to accept that Britain had special interests in the Mediterranean, then so did the Soviet Union have special interests in the Black Sea, leading him to say "Bulgaria was not Italy, Spain, Greece or even Yugoslavia". At one point, Molotov hinted that the Soviet Union was willing to accept the partition of Yugoslavia with Britain taking the Adriatic coast and the Soviet Union the interior, if only the British would cede Bulgaria. On 11 October, Molotov offered Eden 20% influence in Bulgaria and an amended armistice that stated the ACC in Bulgaria would act on the commands of the Soviet High Command but with the "participation" of the British and American governments. Eden agreed to Molotov's draft, and also agreed that the armistice with Hungary when signed would be identical to the Bulgarian armistice.

=== US views on the matter ===
In a telegram to Roosevelt sent on 11 October, Churchill wrote

Stalin and I should try to get a common mind about the Balkans, so that we may prevent civil war breaking out in several countries, when probably you and I would be in sympathy with one side and U.J. ["Uncle Joseph"-i.e. Stalin] with the other. I shall keep you informed of all this, and nothing will be settled except preliminary agreements between Britain and Russia, subject to further discussion and melting down with you. On this basis I am sure you will not mind our trying to have a full meeting of minds with the Russians.

The same day Churchill sent a letter to Stalin saying that Britain had special ties to King Peter II and King George II of Greece, which made it a matter of British honour that they be restored to their thrones, though he also professed to believe that the peoples of the Balkans were entitled to choose any form of political system they liked except fascism. Churchill stated the percentages were only "a method by which in our thoughts we can see how near we are together" and find a means to come closer. Towards the War Cabinet upon his return to London on 12 October, Churchill stated the agreement was "only an interim guide for the immediate wartime future. ..."

Churchill argued that ceding Romania to the Soviet sphere was just because Antonescu had chosen to take part in Operation Barbarossa in June 1941. Though Eden had secured from Molotov a commitment that the Bulgarians were to pull out of the parts of Yugoslavia and Greece they had occupied, the problem of spheres of influence in Bulgaria and the Bulgarian armistice had not gone away. The Americans had now discovered an interest in Bulgaria after all, and the Secretary of State Cordell Hull insisted upon a text of armistice agreement that would give the American delegation on the ACC supervising Bulgaria an equal say with the Soviet delegation. Though American ambassador to Great Britain John Gilbert Winant was outvoted at a meeting of the European Advisory Commission on 21 October 1944 about the text of the Bulgarian armistice, he also stated that this was not final and the United States was prepared to reopen the question at the next meeting of the European Advisory Commission.

== Historiography ==
It was only in 1958 that Soviet historians first acknowledged Churchill's account in Triumph and Tragedy, and then only to deny it. The Soviet diplomatic historian Igor Zemskov wrote in the historical journal Mezhdunarodnaya zhizn that Churchill's claim of a percentages agreement was a "dirty, crude" lie with no basis in fact, saying no such offer had been made to Stalin, who would have rejected had it been made. The charge that Stalin coldly and cynically abandoned EAM which was in a position to take over all of Greece in October 1944 proved damaging to his reputation in left-wing circles. Some historians, including Gabriel Kolko and Geoffrey Roberts believe that the importance of the agreement is overrated. Kolko writes :

There is little significance to the memorable and dramatic passage in Churchill's autobiography recalling how he and Stalin divided Eastern Europe ... Stalin's "tick," translated into real words, indicated nothing whatsoever. The very next day Churchill sent Stalin a draft of the discussion, and the Russian carefully struck out phrases implying the creation of spheres of influence, a fact Churchill excluded from his memoirs. British Foreign Minister Anthony Eden assiduously avoided the term, and considered the understanding merely as a practical agreement on how problems would be worked out in each country, and the very next day he and [Soviet Foreign Minister] Vyacheslav Molotov modified the percentages in a manner which Eden assumed was general rather than precise.

Henry Butterfield Ryan writes, that "Eden and Molotov haggled over these quantities as though they were bargaining over a rug in a bazaar, with Molotov trying, eventually successfully, to trim Britain's figures." In The Cambridge History of the Cold War, Norman Naimark writes that together with the Yalta and Potsdam agreements, "the notorious percentages agreement between Joseph Stalin and Winston Churchill...confirmed that Eastern Europe, initially at least, would lie within the sphere of influence of the Soviet Union." Sergey Radchenko wrote, "even if Stalin gave up on Greece because he never intended to go there in the first place, he tried to present his reluctance as a concession, for which he sought a reciprocal British concession: a promise not to meddle in the Balkans. Stalin valued Churchill's recognition of Soviet gains because such a recognition conferred a sense of legitimacy to these gain.

Andrew Roberts wrote in his biography of Churchill that though denounced, the agreement saved Greek democracy. In his biography of Churchill, Roy Jenkins writes that the agreement "proposed Realpolitik spheres of influence in the Balkans. The Foreign Office record reported Churchill as saying that 'the Americans would be shocked if they saw how crudely he had put it.'" David Carlton wrote that "[With the October contract] a clear if informal deal had been done on the point that mattered most to Churchill: he had Stalin's consent to handle Greece as he saw fit." Anthony Eden wrote that months before the meeting, he and Churchill had discussed the issue and "we felt entitled to ask for Soviet support for our policy [with regard to Greece] in return for the support we were giving to Soviet policy with regard to Romania." Richard Crampton described the agreement as "infamous" with Churchill and Stalin in a "cavalier fashion" dividing up Eastern Europe into spheres of influence with no effort to consult the peoples concerned.

== Aftermath ==
As Churchill saw it, the agreement was very favourable for Britain as EAM mostly controlled Greece, which Stalin agreed to accept as being in the British sphere of influence, while in exchange Britain recognised Bulgaria and Romania, which the Red Army already occupied, as being in the Soviet sphere of influence. From the British viewpoint, having Greece in the British sphere of influence ended any possibility that EAM might come to power and then give the Soviet Union bases in Greece, whose location made that nation key to controlling the eastern Mediterranean, which for Churchill was far more important than the rest of the Balkans. The fact that Roosevelt did not share Churchill's enthusiasm for restoring King George II as the king of Greece was a crucial factor in reaching his own deal with Stalin and excluding the Americans. Churchill feared that if Roosevelt was included in the talks about the future of Greece, then the Americans might side with the Soviets and agree to recognise EAM as the legitimate government.

During the Dekemvriana fighting in Athens, Roosevelt issued a statement disapproving of fighting between the British and EAM, and in private was reportedly appalled by what was happening in Greece. According to his son Elliott, Roosevelt privately stated "How the British can dare such a thing!... Killing Greek guerrillas! Using British soldiers for such a job! Likewise, American media coverage of the Dekemvriana was overwhelmingly hostile towards the British with American journalists criticizing Churchill for recruiting the Security Battalions to fight for the unpopular King George against the EAM. In response to American claims that Britain was exercising "power politics" in Greece, Churchill snapped back in a speech: "What are power politics?...Is having a Navy twice as big as any other Navy in the world power politics? Is having the largest Air Force in the world, with bases in every part of the world power politics? Is having all the gold in the world power politics? If so, we are certainly not guilty of these offences, I am sorry to say. They are luxuries that have passed away from us."

=== Churchill's later views ===
Reflecting lingering bitterness over American criticism of his policy during the Dekemvriana, Churchill presented in Triumph and Tragedy the proclamation of the Truman Doctrine in 1947 as a belated American acknowledgement of the correctness of his Greek policy, writing how later events had "completely justified" his actions. Churchill juxtaposed the statement from the Acting Secretary of State Dean Acheson in 1947 before the Senate that the victory for the Greek Communists in the Greek Civil War would be "dangerous" to the United States. At least part of the reason why Churchill revealed the percentages agreement in Triumph and Tragedy was to portray himself as a far-sighted statesman who had cleverly signed the percentages agreement to prevent the Soviet Union from supporting EAM.

At the Yalta Conference (February 1945), Roosevelt suggested that the issues raised in the percentages agreement should be decided by the new United Nations. Stalin was dismayed because he wanted a Soviet sphere of influence in Eastern Europe. According to Melvyn Leffler, Churchill "sought to renege" on the percentages agreement as the world war ended and Greece was secured. This was especially the case as Churchill and Roosevelt kept such severe discretion around the agreement that their successors in office were not aware of it. Stalin, meanwhile, initially believed the secret agreement was more important than the public deal at Yalta, leading to his perception of betrayal and a growing urgency to secure friendly governments on the USSR's border.

Churchill's History of the Second World War books were written as much to influence the present as to understand the past. In the 1950s, Churchill was obsessed with the possibility of a nuclear war, and very much wanted to find a way to defuse the Cold War before it turned into a Third World War, which he believed might be the end of humanity. A major theme of the later volumes in the History of the Second World War series was that it was possible to reach an understanding with the Soviet Union. Given these concerns, Churchill presented the percentages agreement as a triumph of statecraft, with the obvious implication that this was the solution to the Cold War with the Western powers and the Soviet Union agreeing to respect each other's spheres of influence. In a 1956 interview with C. L. Sulzberger, Churchill said:

Stalin never broke his word to me. We agreed on the Balkans. I said he could have Romania and Bulgaria, and he said we could have Greece… When we went in in 1944 Stalin didn't interfere.

All the countries mentioned in the percentages agreement fell under Communist control with the exception of Greece, where the Communists lost the Greek Civil War. After the Tito-Stalin split of 1948, Yugoslavia, which had been regarded as being in the Soviet sphere of influence, became neutral in the Cold War. Bulgaria, Romania and Hungary were in the Soviet sphere of influence after 1945. After 1956, Hungary under János Kádár stayed loyal to Moscow with regard to foreign affairs, but introduced significant reforms in the domestic sphere that were dubbed "Goulash Communism". Romania under Gheorghe Gheorghiu-Dej was loyal to the Soviet Union at first, but started to show signs of independence from 1959 onward with Gheorghiu-Dej rejecting Soviet economic plans for Romania.

The Romanian tendency to move away from the Soviet sphere of influence increased under Nicolae Ceaușescu, who established diplomatic relations with West Germany in 1967, publicly criticized the Soviet invasions of Czechoslovakia in 1968 and of Afghanistan in 1979, and in 1971 visited China, which just fought a border war with the Soviet Union in 1969, to praise Mao Zedong as a role model for Romania. The Romanian tendency to praise China, which had challenged the Soviet Union for leadership of the Communist world, was seen widely both at home and abroad as anti-Soviet.

== See also ==
- Anglo-Soviet invasion of Iran
- Anglo-Soviet Treaty of 1942
- British–Soviet relations
- United Kingdom–Yugoslavia relations
- Moscow Conference (1944)
