= Dominic Schroeder =

British diplomat

His Excellency Dominic Schroeder
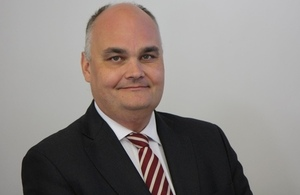

British Ambassador to Denmark
- In office August 2016 – July 2020
- Preceded by: Vivien Life
- Succeeded by: Emma Hopkins

Head of the UK Delegation to the OSCE
- In office 2011–2015
- Preceded by: Ian Cliff
- Succeeded by: Sian MacLeod

Head of mission in Slovakia
- In office January 2011 – August 2011
- Preceded by: Michael Roberts
- Succeeded by: Susannah Montgomery

Personal details
- Born: 13 November 1965 Brent, Greater London
- Spouse: Susan
- Children: 2 (1 son, 1 daughter)
- Occupation: Diplomat

Dominic Sebastian Schroeder (born 13 November 1965) is a British diplomat currently serving as Principal of the International Academy of the Foreign, Commonwealth and Development Office.

He was previously British Ambassador to Denmark and Ambassador and Head of the United Kingdom's Delegation to the Organization for Security and Co-operation in Europe in Vienna.

== Career ==
Schroeder joined the Foreign & Commonwealth Office (FCO) in 1988. His first overseas posting was in 1989 as Third Secretary in Kinshasa, where he was promoted to Second Secretary. He returned to an FCO posting in 1992 and the next year went as Second Secretary to the United Kingdom Mission to the United Nations in New York City. Later postings were in Tehran, Berlin, and Bratislava.

In August 2003, while posted at the Foreign and Commonwealth Office, Schroeder was an active participant in an FCO campaign to remove Craig Murray as British ambassador in Uzbekistan, sending a minute to all members of staff in the embassy in Tashkent, "so they all knew exactly the hymn-sheet from which the office wished them to sing", as Murray later put it.

In 2004, Schroeder was appointed as Head of the FCO's Common Foreign and Security Policy Group, and in July 2006 was called on to give evidence to the House of Lords European Union Committee.

In 2006, he was posted to Berlin, as Counsellor (EU and Economic) and in 2009 was appointed as deputy Head of Mission there.

For the first half of 2011, Schroeder was chargé d'affaires, or temporary head of mission, in Slovakia, then was posted as Ambassador and Head of the United Kingdom's Delegation to the Organization for Security and Co-operation in Europe, based in Vienna. He was next British Ambassador to Denmark, from August 2016 until July 2020.

Interviewed in Copenhagen three months after the Brexit referendum, he said "...for me personally, the priority in my job is the maintenance and preservation of the security, welfare and livelihood of British nationals in Denmark". He made it clear that the United Kingdom would not invoke Article 50 before the end of 2016 and added "Never forget that the UK is leaving the EU, but we’re not leaving Europe. The importance of bi-lateral relationships... will just continue to grow."

In June 2017, Schroeder was involved in a dispute with the Danish Finance Minister Kristian Jensen at a conference on Brexit. Jensen said, quoting Paul-Henri Spaak, "There are two kinds of European nations. There are small nations and there are countries that have not yet realized they are small nations". Schroeder responded that he saw no indications "of a diminished or diminishing power."

In 2021, Schroeder was appointed as Principal of the International Academy of the Foreign, Commonwealth and Development Office.
