= United Kingdom–Yugoslavia relations =

United Kingdom–Kingdom of Yugoslavia relations
- United Kingdom: Yugoslavia

United Kingdom–Yugoslavia relations
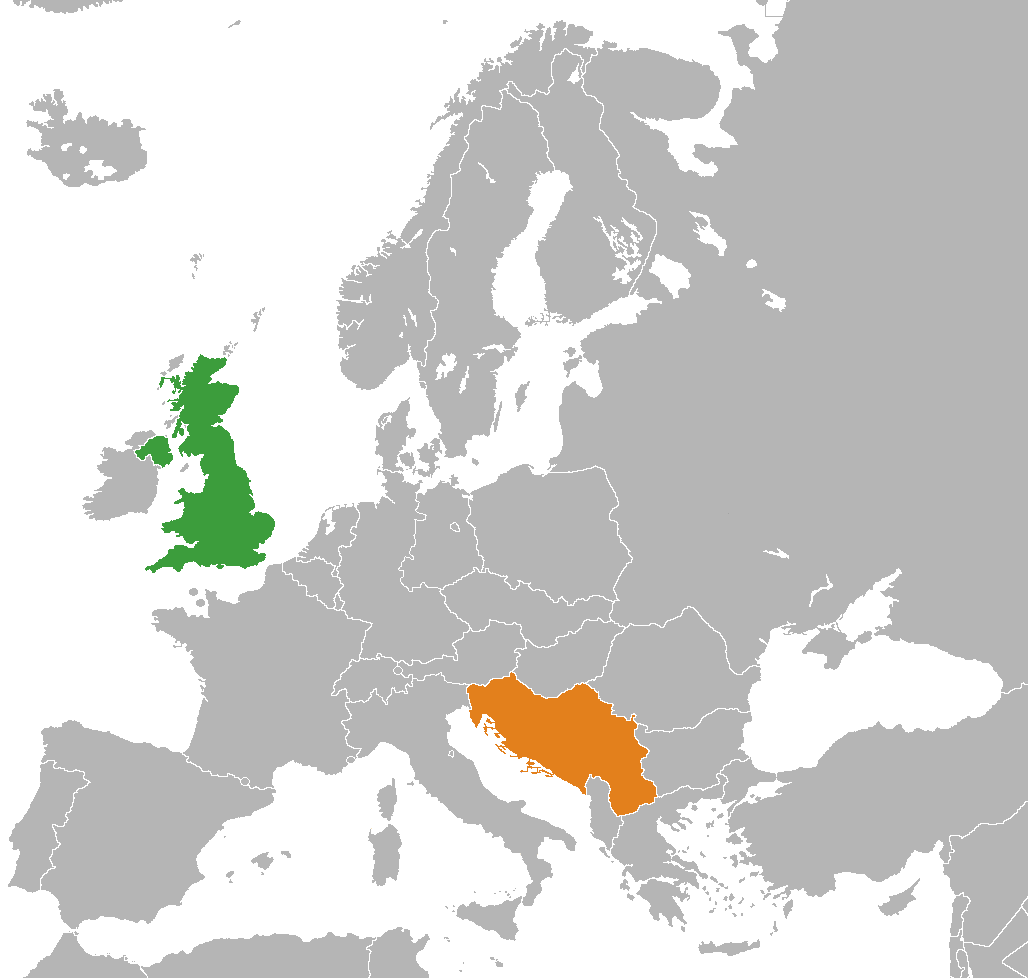

- United Kingdom: Yugoslavia

United Kingdom–Yugoslavia relations (Serbo-Croatian: Odnosi Ujedinjenog Kraljevstva i Jugoslavije, Односи Уједињеног Краљевства и Југославије; Slovene: Odnosi med Veliko Britanijo in Jugoslavijo; Macedonian: Односите Обединетото Кралство-Југославија) were historical foreign relations between United Kingdom and former Yugoslavia (Kingdom of Yugoslavia 1918-1941 and Socialist Federal Republic of Yugoslavia 1945–1992). Relations between United Kingdom and independent South Slavic states (primarily Serbia) developed before creation of Yugoslavia following the decline of the Ottoman Empire.

== History ==
=== Kingdom of Yugoslavia ===
The UK officially recognized the Kingdom of Serbs, Croats, and Slovenes in early June 1919, shortly before the signing of the Treaty of Versailles. In the Kingdom of Yugoslavia, the UK was perceived as a friendly country and natural ally in European and international affairs. Serb elites, based mostly in Belgrade, like Slobodan Jovanović and Bogdan Bogdanović considered that Serbs and the English shared joint values. Following the Yugoslav coup d'état, the Kingdom of Yugoslavia entered World War II on the Allied side.

=== World War II ===
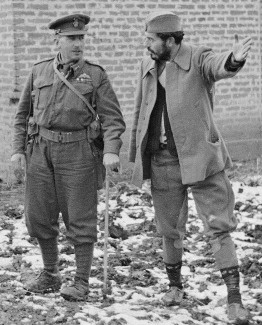
Brigadier Charles Armstrong with Yugoslav-Chetnik officer Predrag Raković, autumn 1943.

A British Army mission headed by Fitzroy Maclean was sent to Yugoslav Partisans in September 1943 while Yugoslav mission arrived in London in May 1944. British Prime Minister Winston Churchill and Marshal of Yugoslavia Josip Broz Tito met in Naples on 12 August 1944.

=== Socialist Yugoslavia ===
The secret percentages agreement signed between Joseph Stalin and Winston Churchill dividing Eastern Europe into spheres of influence stipulated that Yugoslavia would be split "50/50" between British and Soviet influence. The United Kingdom recognized the new socialist government in Yugoslavia in March 1945. The first years after the war were negatively affected by Yugoslav support for the Democratic Army of Greece during the Greek Civil War and the Free Territory of Trieste dispute. Following the Tito–Stalin split of 1948 the Labour government developed a friendly relationship with the anti-Stalinist League of Communists of Yugoslavia beginning in the 1950s. Foreign Secretary Ernest Bevin defined the post-1948 British policy of keeping Tito's government afloat while the two countries signed their first trade agreement in 1948 and an agreement of nationalized property in 1949. Anthony Eden visited the Socialist Federal Republic of Yugoslavia in September 1952. President of Yugoslavia Josip Broz Tito visited United Kingdom in 1953 in his first official state visit to any Western Bloc country. Edvard Kardelj followed with his visit to UK in 1955 while Selwyn Lloyd visited Belgrade in 1957. Social Security Convention was signed in 1958, Consular Convention and technical cooperation agreement in 1966, scientific cooperation agreement in 1968 and agreement on abolition of visas in 1969. In 1971 United Kingdom was fourth trade partner of Yugoslavia after West Germany, Italy and USSR. In 1981 two countries signed an Income Tax Treaty.

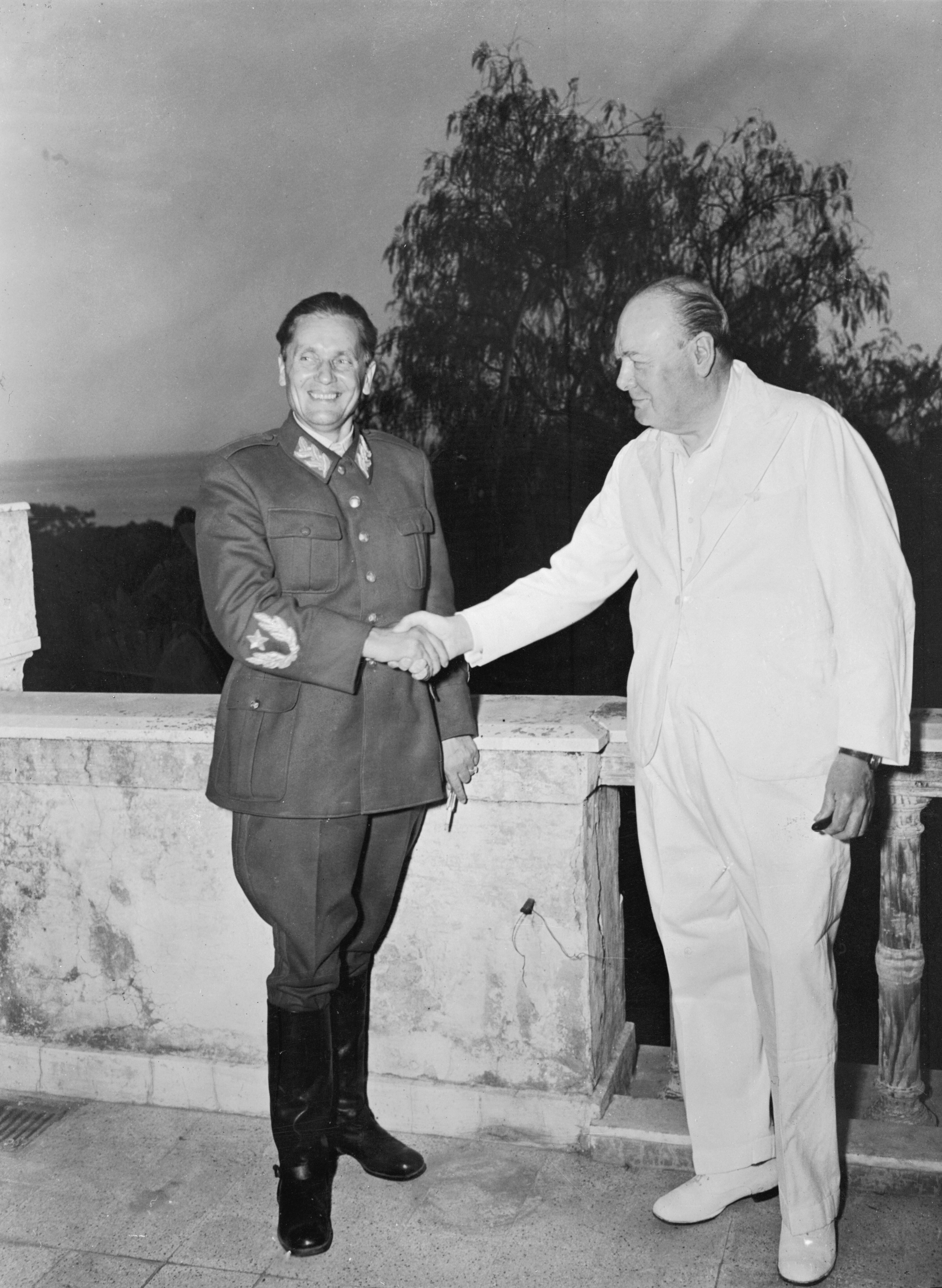
Tito and Churchill in 1944

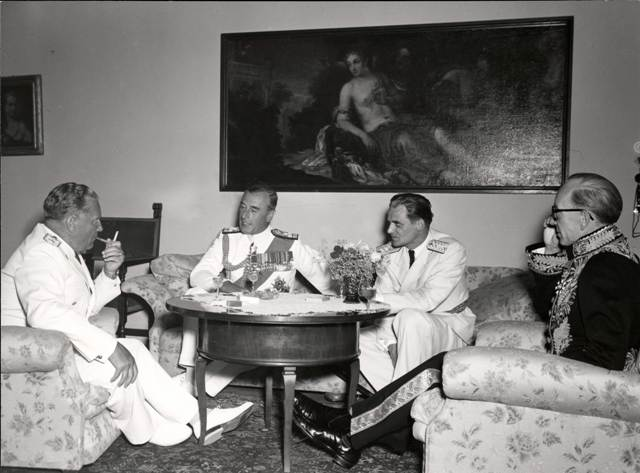
Louis Mountbatten, 1st Earl Mountbatten of Burma on Brijuni islands in 1952

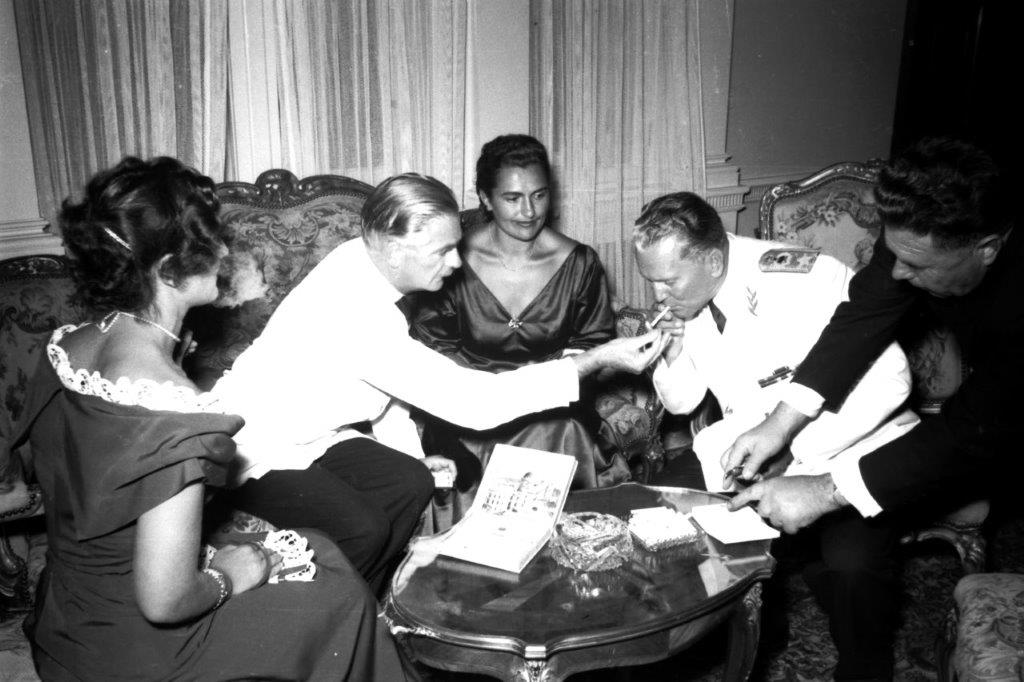
Anthony Eden in Belgrade, 1952.

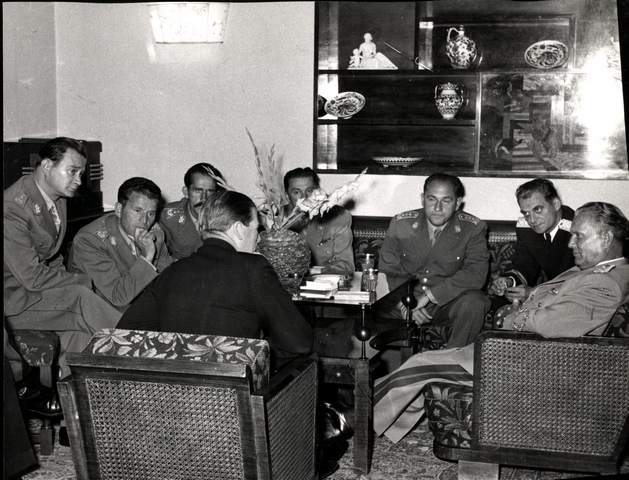
John Harding, 1st Baron Harding of Petherton in Zagreb in 1953

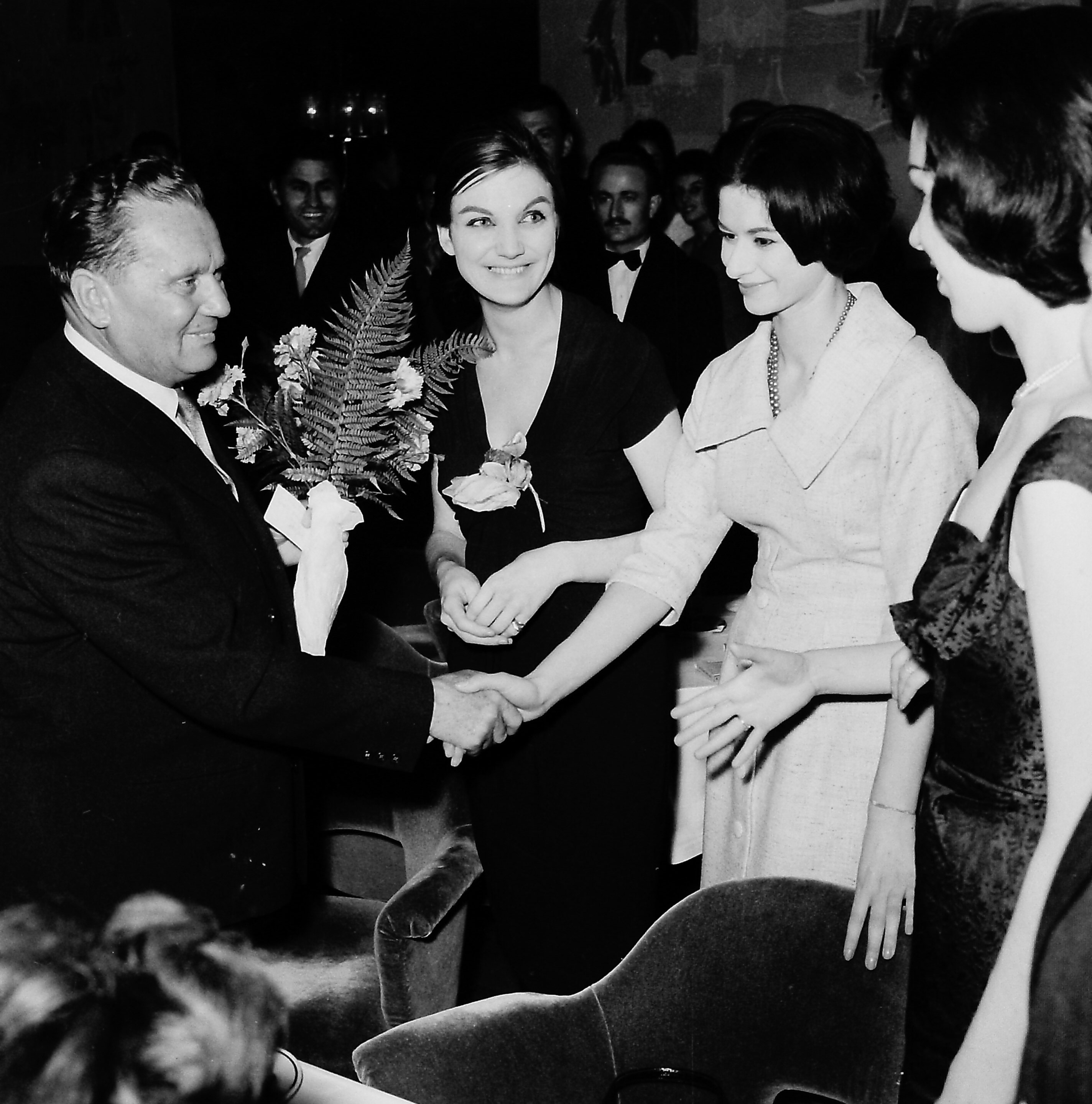
Margot Fonteyn in Belgrade in 1954.

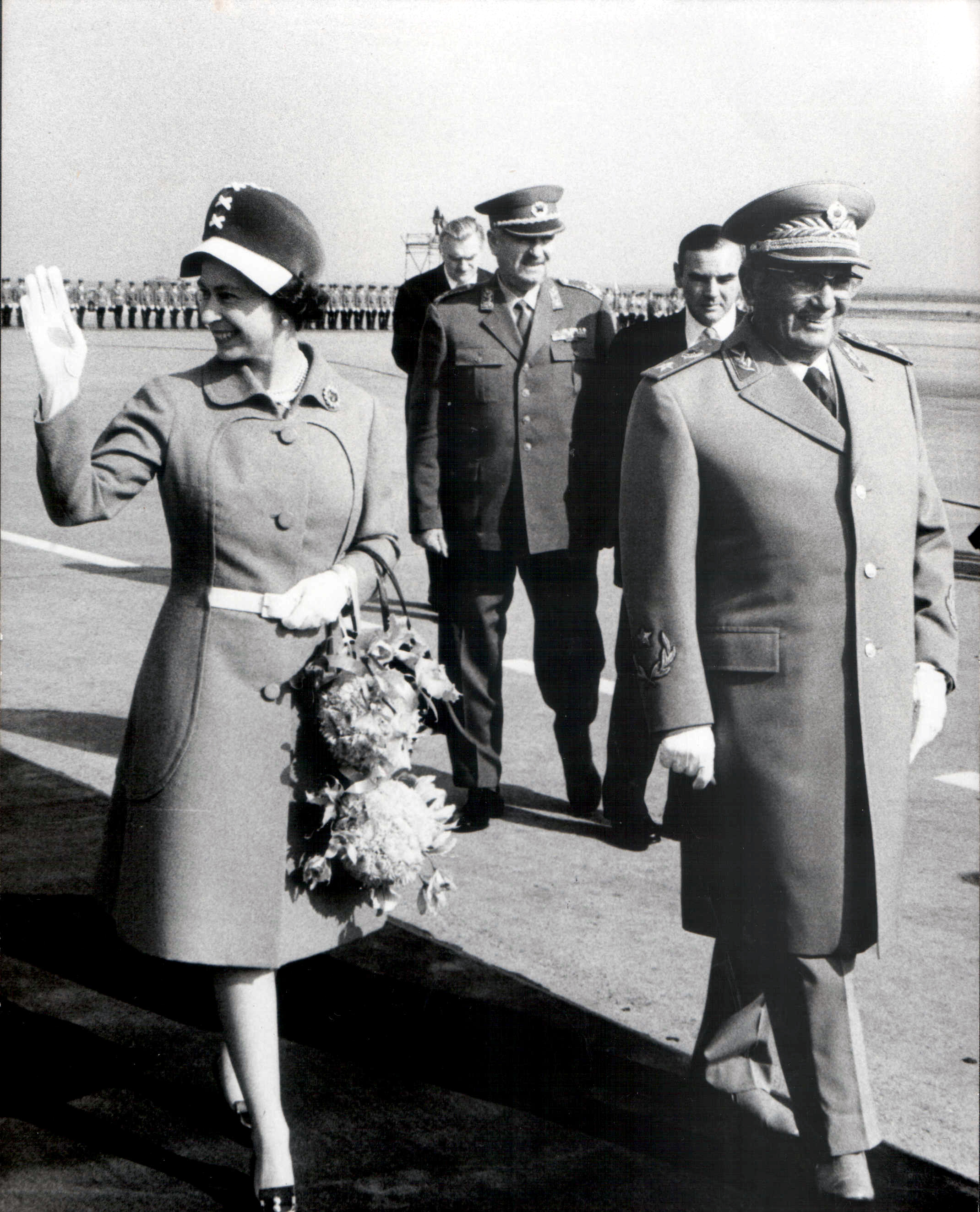
Queen Elizabeth II and Josip Broz Tito in Belgrade in 1972

== See also ==
- Foreign relations of the United Kingdom
- Foreign relations of Yugoslavia
- Bosnia and Herzegovina–United Kingdom relations
- Croatia–United Kingdom relations
- Montenegro–United Kingdom relations
- North Macedonia–United Kingdom relations
- Serbia–United Kingdom relations
- Slovenia–United Kingdom relations
- Kosovo–United Kingdom relations
- Allied bombing of Yugoslavia in World War II
