= List of ambassadors of the United Kingdom to Croatia =

The ambassador of the United Kingdom to Croatia is the United Kingdom's foremost diplomatic representative in the Republic of Croatia, and head of the UK's diplomatic mission in Zagreb. The official title is His Britannic Majesty's Ambassador to the Republic of Croatia.

Croatia declared independence in 1991 during the break-up of Yugoslavia, and the United Kingdom recognised the new Republic in 1992.

== Ambassadors ==
- 1992–1994: Bryan Sparrow
- 1994–1997: Gavin Hewitt
- 1997–2000: Colin Munro
- 2000–2004: Nicholas Jarrold
- 2004–2008: Sir John Ramsden, 9th Baronet
- 2008–2012: David Blunt
- 2012–2015: David Slinn
- 2015–2016: Ian Cliff (chargé d'affaires)
- 2016–2021: Andrew Dalgleish
- 2021–2025: Simon Thomas
- 2025–present: Javed Patel

== See also ==
- Croatia–United Kingdom relations
