= International Academy (United Kingdom) =

The International Academy, originally known as the Diplomatic Academy, is an institution of the Foreign, Commonwealth and Development Office (FCDO) of the United Kingdom. It is located in the main building of the FCDO in King Charles Street, London. The principal is Dominic Schroeder.

== History ==
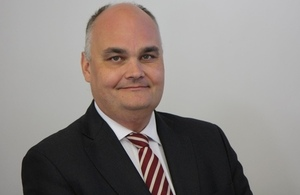
Dominic Schroeder

The creation of the Diplomatic Academy was announced by Foreign Secretary William Hague on 19 September 2013. The academy began operations in 2014 and was officially opened by Foreign Secretary Philip Hammond on 10 February 2015. It was renamed the International Academy as part of the 2020 creation of the Foreign, Commonwealth and Development Office.

Jon Davies served as the first director (2014–2017), followed by Jon Benjamin (2017–2020) and Dominic Schroeder (2021–present). The institution functions as a directorate of the FCDO.

== Faculty ==
The Academy was originally structured into 11 thematic areas, or "Faculties": These were: International Policy, Diplomatic Practice, States and Societies, Understanding the UK, Consular and Crisis Management, Economics and Prosperity, Europe, Multilateral, Security Defence and Intelligence, Law, and Languages. A twelfth Faculty, Trade Policy and Negotiations, was introduced in 2016 following the UK’s decision to leave the European Union.

In 2017, the Academy absorbed further internal responsibilities for management and leadership training and for the FCO's overseas network of Regional Learning & Development Teams, which became the Diplomatic Academy Regional Teams (DARTs). It subsequently became the principal learning and development organisation of the FCO.

== Facilities ==
A new learning facility named the Mayhew Theatre (after Baroness Cicely Mayhew, the UK's first woman diplomat) was officially opened on 4 March 2019 by Prince William, Duke of Cambridge. The name was chosen through a staff vote.

The Academy's face-to-face and online programmes are aimed at FCDO employees and employees of other UK government departments and agencies who are working in international roles. It does not offer external enrolment on face-to-face courses, but it has experimented with the concept of the Massive Open Online Course and has released two public courses. The first, entitled Diplomacy in the 21st Century, was developed with the Open University and ran on the FutureLearn platform in January–March and May-July 2019 with over 13,500 registrations in total. A second course entitled Introduction to British Diplomacy ran in February and May 2020.
