= Andrew Dalgleish (diplomat) =

British diplomat (born 1975)

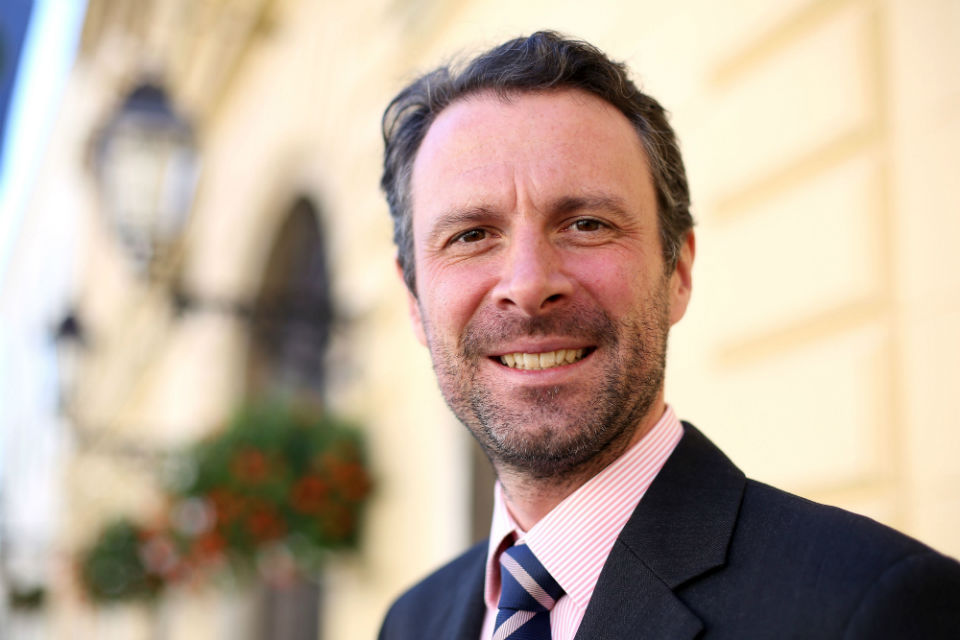

British Ambassador to Croatia
- In office July 2016 – 2022
- Monarchs: Elizabeth II; Charles III
- Prime Minister: Theresa May; Boris Johnson; Liz Truss
- Preceded by: Ian Cliff (Chargé d'Affaires)

Personal details
- Born: 17 December 1975 (age 50)

Andrew Dalgleish (born 17 December 1975) is a British diplomat. He served as British Ambassador to Croatia from 2016 to 2021. From 2022 to 2024, he was Deputy High Commissioner to Pakistan, acting as Chargé d’Affaires from January 2023 during the absence of a High Commissioner. In January 2025, he was appointed Deputy Head of Mission at the British Embassy in Paris.

== Early life ==
Dalgleish studied European Law at the University of Warwick, graduating with first class honours. He also spent a year at Montesquieu University in Bordeaux, studying French law.

== Career ==
Dalgleish joined the Department of Social Security in 1998. He went on to join the Department of Environment, Food and Rural Affairs and the United Kingdom Representation to the European Union, where he worked until 2008. He served as the deputy head of mission at the British Embassy Seoul from 2011 to 2015. He became the Ambassador to Croatia in July 2016.

While ambassador in Croatia, Dalgleish had to deal with the COVID-19 pandemic and was interviewed about its impact on his diplomatic life. He noted that he was glad he had moved his children from the United Kingdom to join him.

In 2019, Dalgleish reassured Croatian citizens living in the United Kingdom that the British Government had taken measures to protect EU citizens in the event of a No-deal Brexit.

In 2022, Dalgleish was appointed as deputy British High Commissioner to Pakistan. As of January 2023, he was serving as acting High Commissioner and stated that the international community needed a clear plan from Pakistan on the spending of international aid. "What won’t happen is $9 billion will be dumped into Pakistan’s bank account and they will then figure out what to do."

Diplomatic posts
Preceded by Ian Cliff as Chargé d'Affaires	British Ambassador to Croatia; 2016–present	Incumbent
