= North Macedonia–United Kingdom relations =

- United Kingdom: North Macedonia

Diplomatic mission
- United Kingdom Embassy, Skopje: North Macedonia Embassy, London

Envoy
- Ambassador Rachel Galloway: Ambassador Aleksandra Miovska

North Macedonia–United Kingdom relations are the bilateral and diplomatic relations between the Republic of North Macedonia and the United Kingdom of Great Britain and Northern Ireland. Both countries are members of the Council of Europe and NATO.

== History ==
Diplomatic relations were first established in 1993 following North Macedonia's (then formerly known officially as the Republic of Macedonia) independence from Yugoslavia in 1991. The UK has supported both North Macedonia's bid to join the European Union and North Macedonia's accession to NATO. In June 1996, the first British-Macedonian parliamentary group was established.

== Economic relations ==
On 3 December 2020, North Macedonia and the United Kingdom signed the Partnership, Trade and Cooperation Agreement to continue preferential trade terms after the end of the UK's Brexit transition period. The agreement also strengthened political, economic, security and cultural ties between both nations.

== Diplomatic missions ==
The current ambassador of North Macedonia to the United Kingdom is Aleksandra Miovska, while Rachel Galloway currently serves as the British ambassador to North Macedonia. North Macedonia operates an embassy in London, and the UK has an embassy in Skopje.

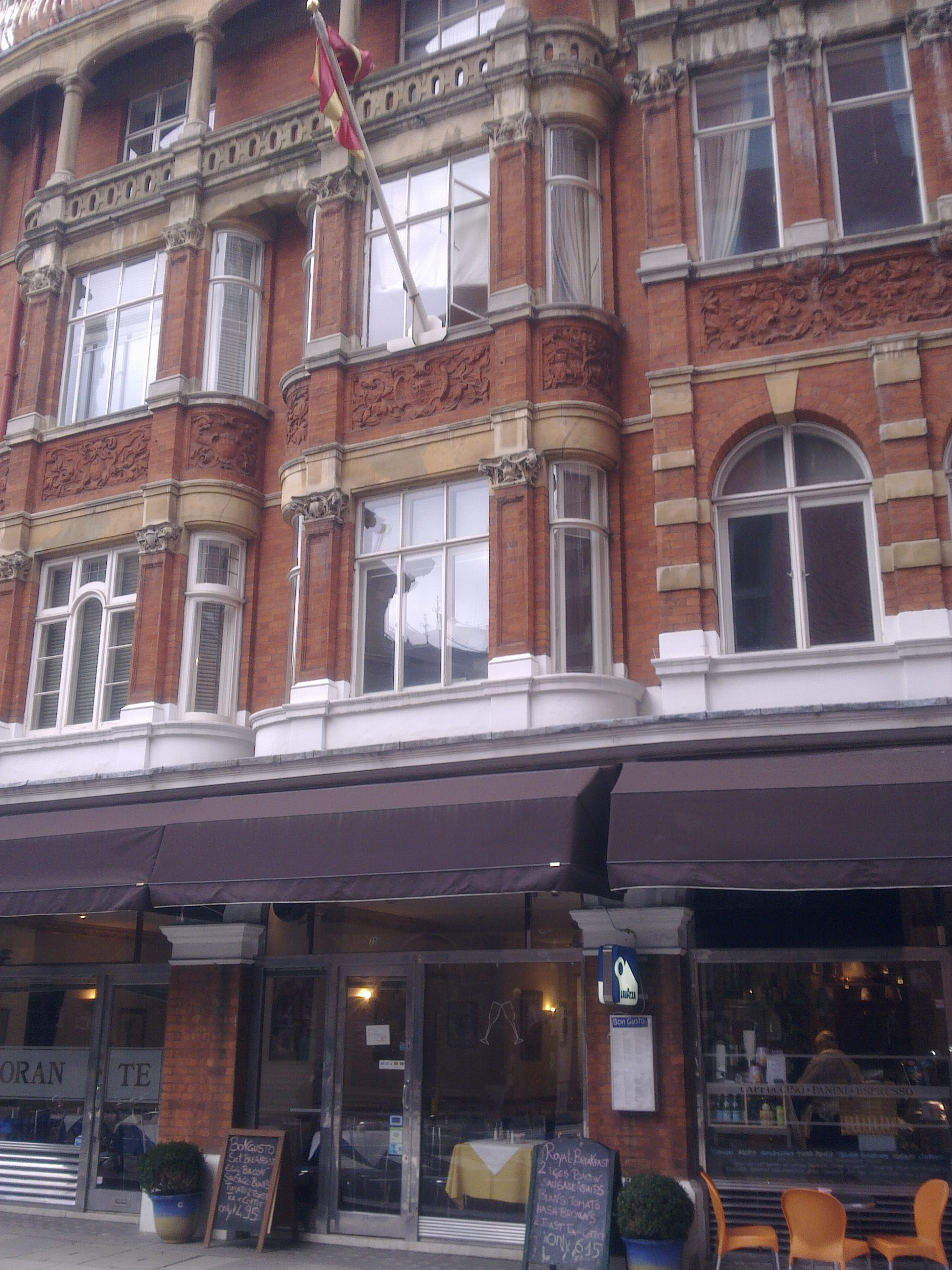
Embassy of North Macedonia in London

== See also ==
- Foreign relations of North Macedonia
- Foreign relations of the United Kingdom
- Macedonians in the United Kingdom
- United Kingdom–Yugoslavia relations
