= Diplomatic Academy (Czech Republic) =

- Czech: Diplomatická akademie
- Established: 1997; 28 years ago

The Diplomatic Academy (Czech: Diplomatická akademie) is a professional school operated by the Czech Ministry of Foreign Affairs, charged with training members of the Czech foreign service. The school's general training program consists of a six-month series of classroom work, followed by a six-month internship within the foreign ministry, and is the entry-point for new hires to the foreign service. Advanced seminars are also offered for seasoned diplomats. As of 2010 it was annually providing training for approximately 40 employees, of which about 15 were attending the academy's general introductory course.

The Diplomatic Academy was established in 1997.

== See also ==
- Foreign Service Institute
