= Montenegro–United Kingdom relations =

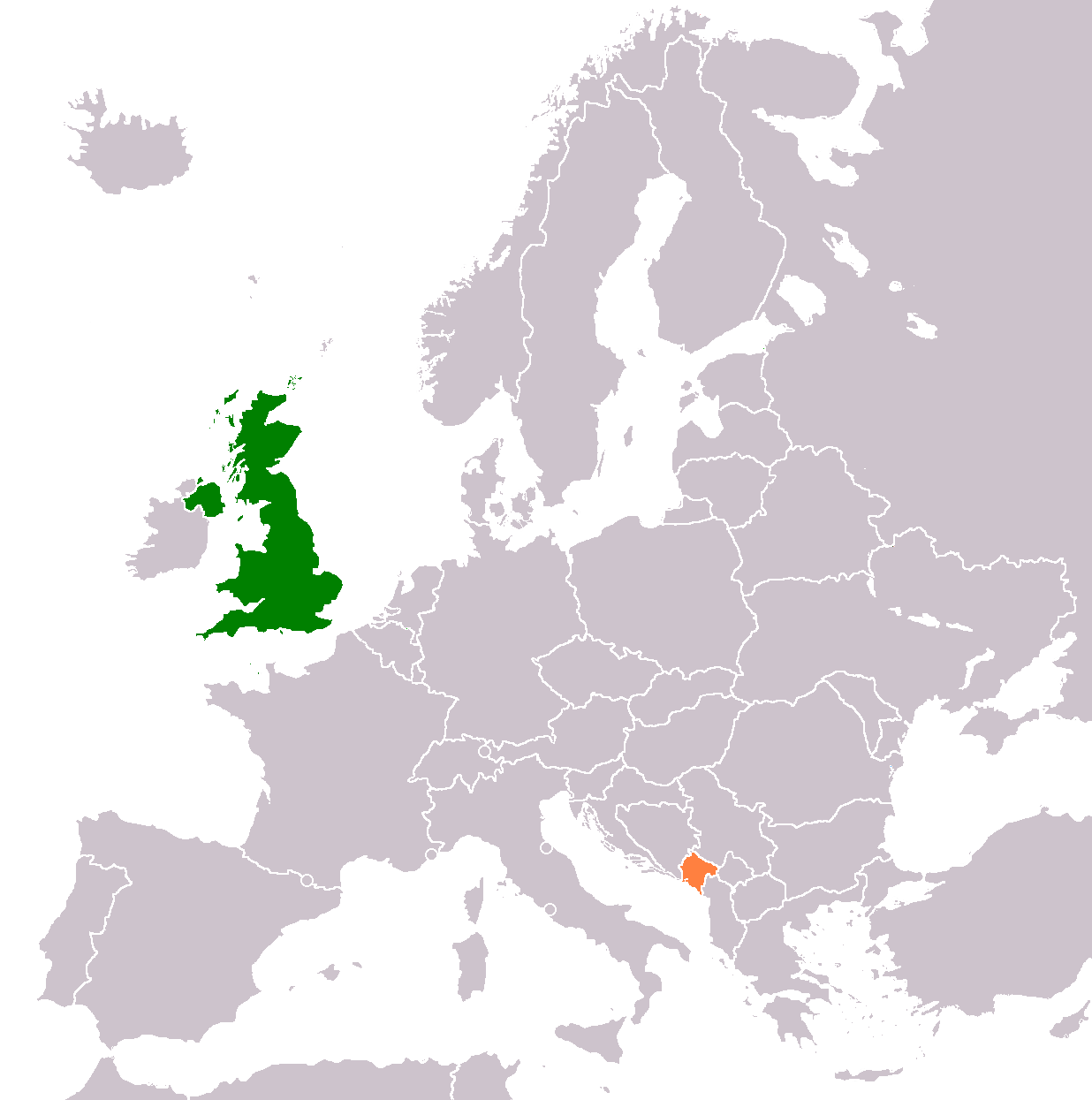

- United Kingdom: Montenegro

Montenegro–United Kingdom relations are the bilateral relations between Montenegro and the United Kingdom. Both nations are members of the Council of Europe and NATO and had fought on the same side in both World War I and World War II.

== History ==
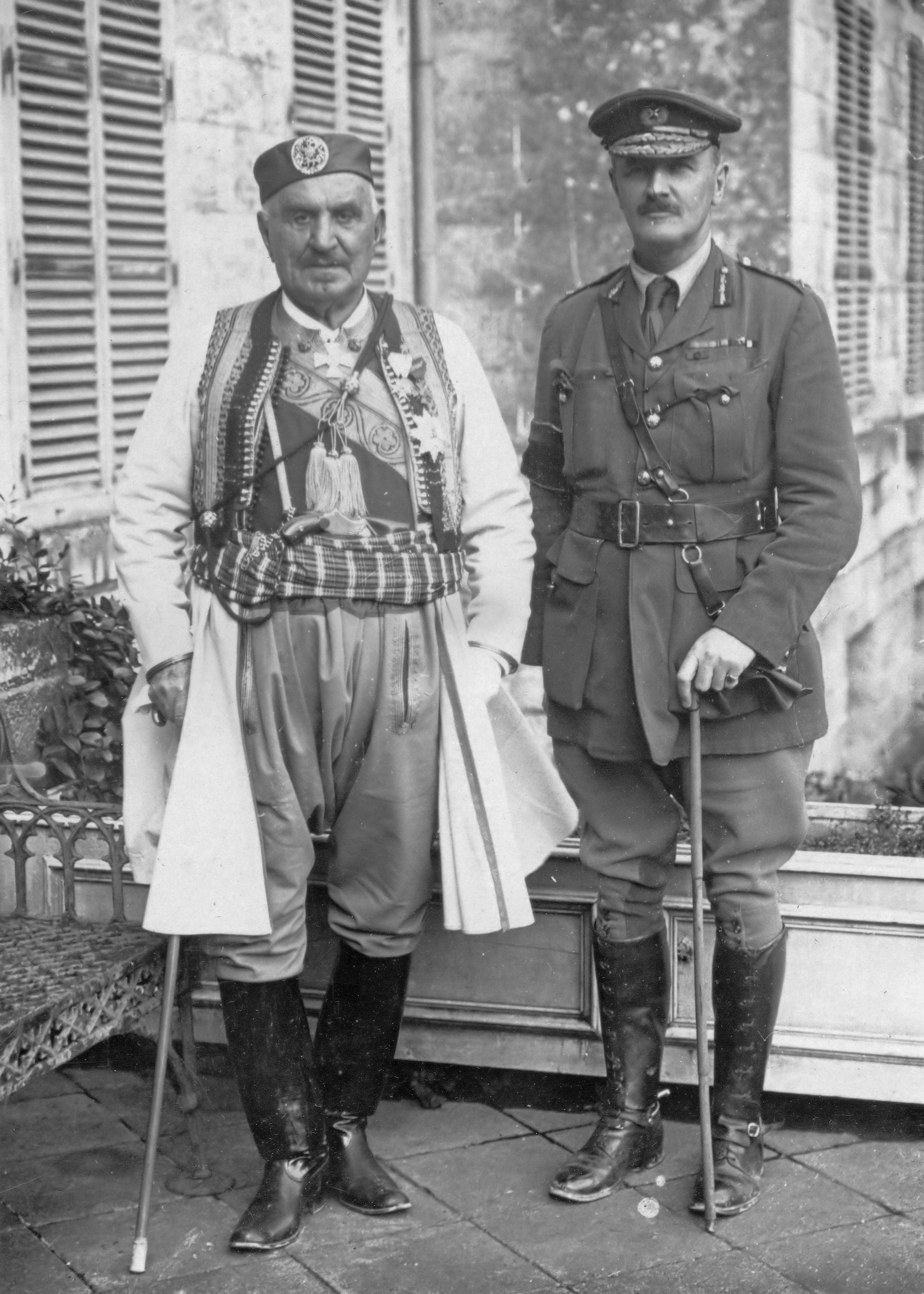
Nicholas I, King of Montenegro, and Field Marshal Edmund Allenby

In 1878, Great Britain recognised Montenegro as an independent and sovereign principality by the Congress of Berlin. During that period Britain maintained an embassy in the royal capital, Cetinje. The former British Embassy in Cetinje is still standing and is now the home of the University of Montenegro Music Academy.

After the dissolution of Serbia and Montenegro, the UK recognised Montenegro as an independent state and established diplomatic relations on 13 June 2006. The UK then upgraded its British Office in Podgorica. The Duke of York visited Montenegro to officially open the new British Embassy in Podgorica in March 2009.

Montenegro opened an embassy in London in September 2007 (the former Embassy of Serbia and Montenegro in London became the Embassy of the Republic of Serbia on 5 June 2006).

== Cultural relations ==
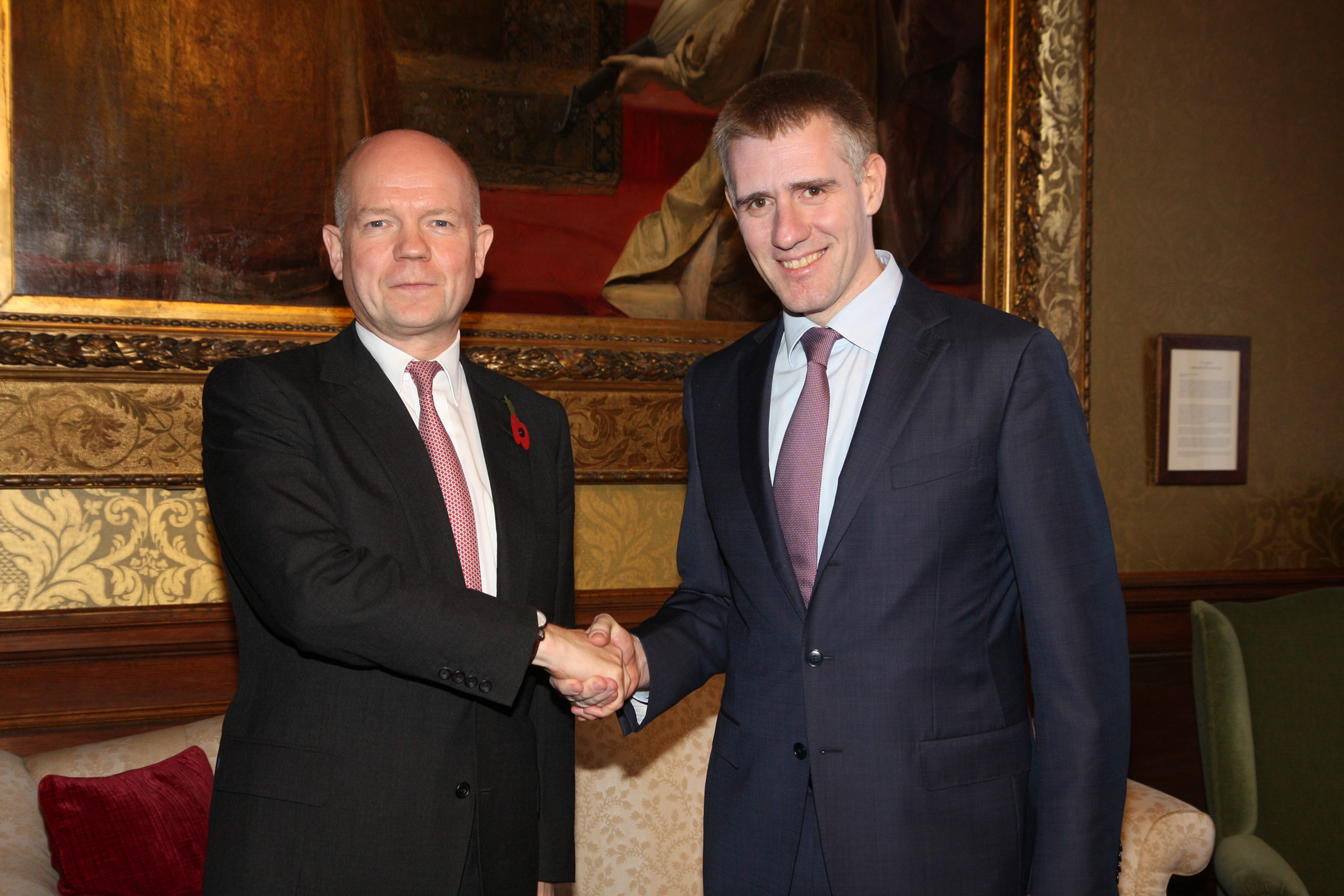
British Foreign Secretary William Hague meeting the former Prime Minister of Montenegro Igor Lukšić in London, October 2013.

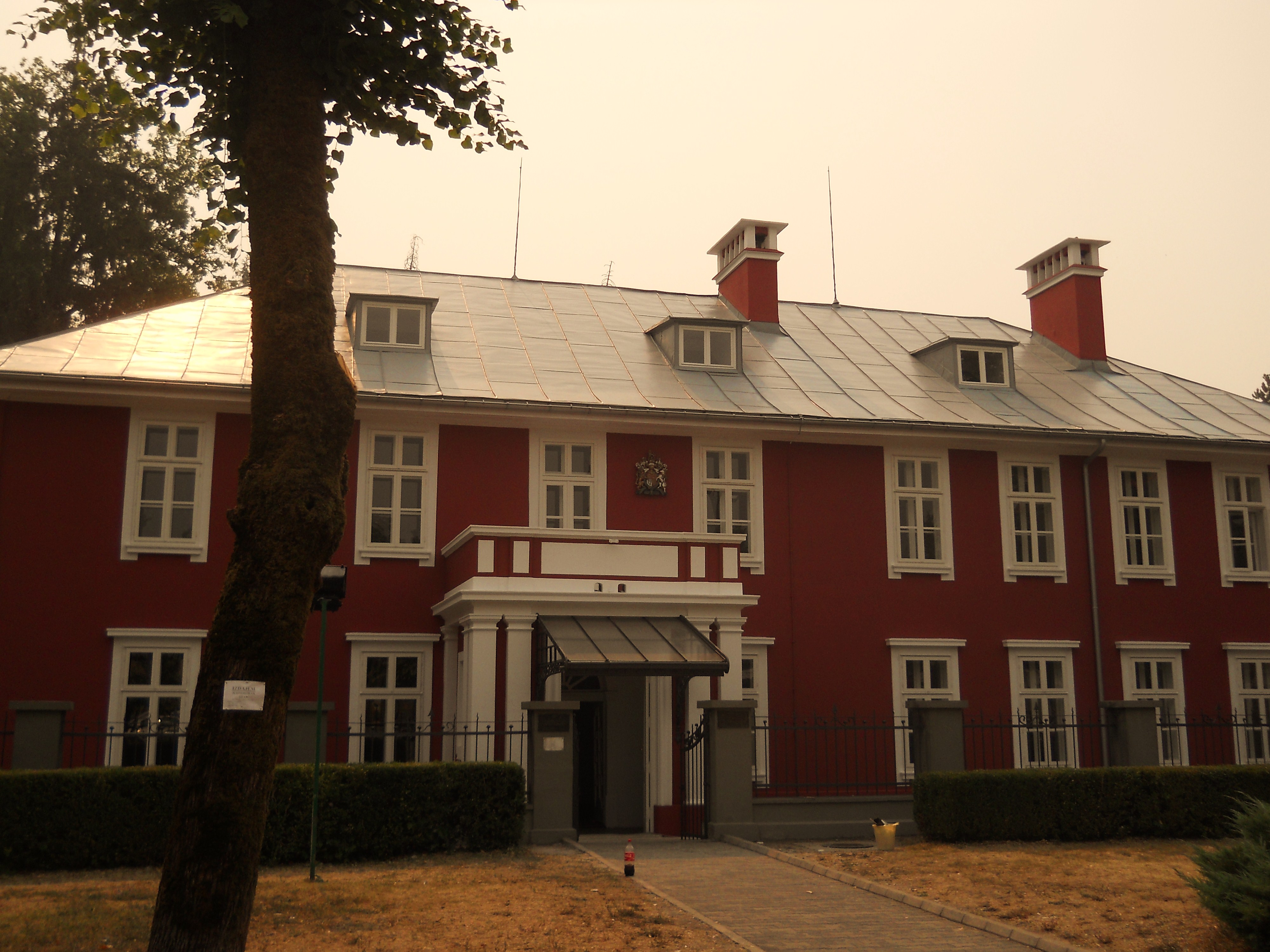
The former British Embassy in Cetinje

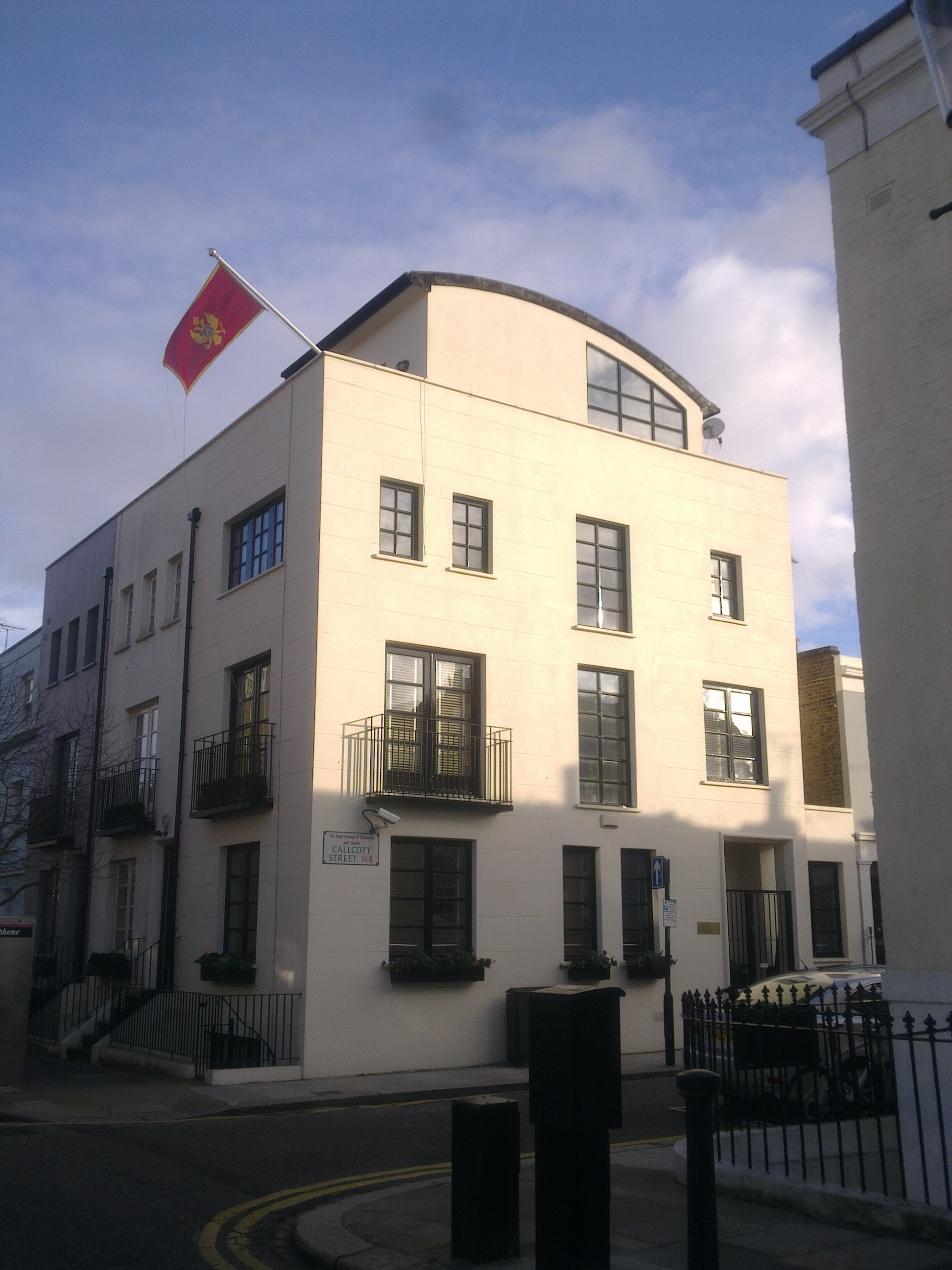
Embassy of Montenegro in London

The British Council has been operating in Podgorica since 1994 and is co-located with the embassy. British Council in Montenegro is nurturing cultural relations between the United Kingdom and Montenegro through its project work in the fields of education, creative industries, governance and English language, and also through maintaining and developing networks with governmental, non-governmental and international organisations locally.

== Economic relations ==
From 1 January 2008 until 30 December 2020, trade between Montenegro and the UK was governed by the Montenegro–European Union Stabilisation and Association Process, while the United Kingdom was a member of the European Union. Following the withdrawal of the United Kingdom from the European Union, the UK offered Montenegro a continuity trade agreement based on the EU free trade agreement, however the agreement was signed by neither country. On 9 June 2021, Greg Hands stated that the UK government remained ready to conclude the trade agreement with the Government of Montenegro.

== Diaspora ==
The 2001 UK Census recorded 31,244 people born in the former state of Serbia and Montenegro, which are now the independent states of Serbia and Montenegro.

== Politics ==
The United Kingdom strongly supports Montenegrin membership into the European Union and NATO.

== Resident diplomatic missions ==
- Montenegro has an embassy in London.
- the United Kingdom has an embassy in Podgorica.

== See also ==
- Foreign relations of the United Kingdom
- Foreign relations of Montenegro
- List of Ambassadors of the United Kingdom to Montenegro
- United Kingdom–Yugoslavia relations
