= Slovenia–United Kingdom relations =

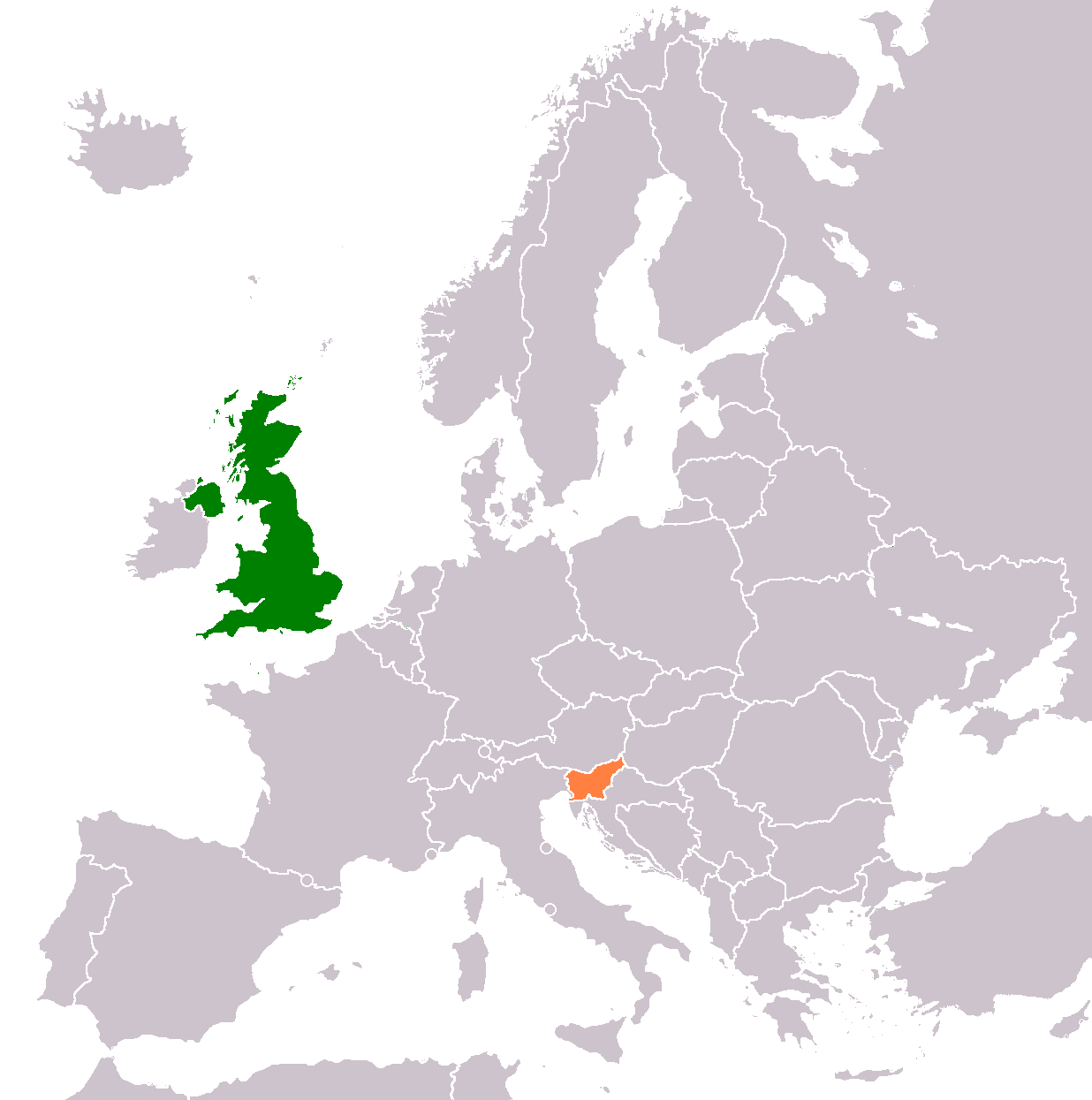

- United Kingdom: Slovenia

Diplomatic mission

Slovenia–United Kingdom relations are the bilateral relations between Slovenia and the United Kingdom. After Slovenia declared independence from Yugoslavia in June 1991, The UK established diplomatic relations with Slovenia on 15 January 1992. Both countries share common membership of the Council of Europe, European Court of Human Rights, the International Criminal Court, NATO, OECD, OSCE, the United Nations, and the World Trade Organization. Bilaterally the two countries have a Double Taxation Convention, and an Investment Agreement. the United Kingdom gave full support to Slovenia's applications for membership in the European Union and NATO.

== Resident diplomatic missions ==
- Slovenia maintains an embassy in London.
- The United Kingdom is accredited to Slovenia through its embassy in Ljubljana.

== See also ==
- Foreign relations of Slovenia
- Foreign relations of the United Kingdom
- United Kingdom–Yugoslavia relations
