= Croatia–United Kingdom relations =

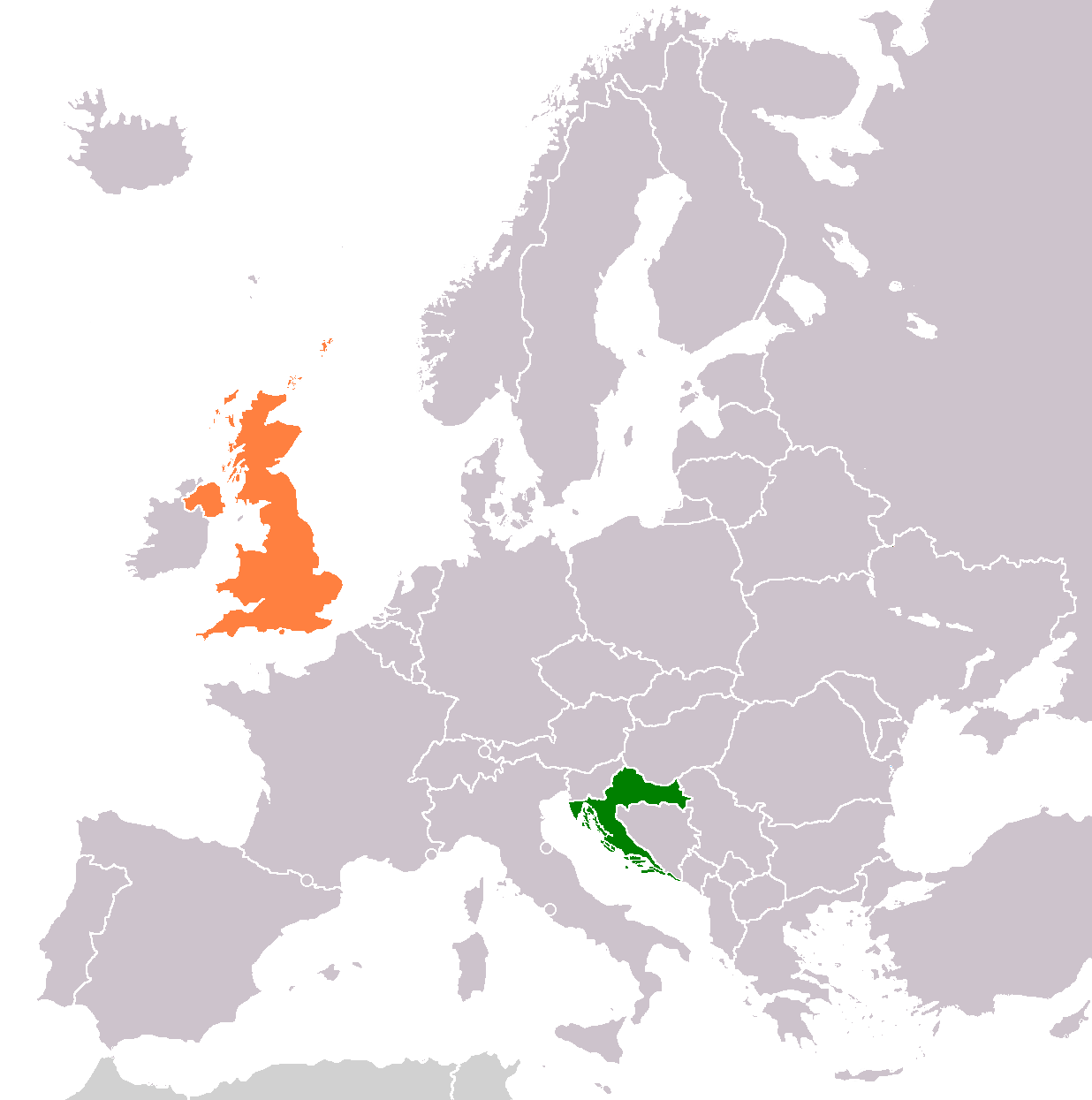

- Croatia: United Kingdom

Diplomatic mission
- Embassy of Croatia, London: Embassy of the United Kingdom, Zagreb

Croatia–United Kingdom relations are the bilateral relations between Croatia and the United Kingdom. After Croatia declared independence from Yugoslavia in June 1991, the UK established diplomatic relations with Croatia on 25 June 1992. Both countries are members of the Council of Europe and NATO. the United Kingdom gave full support to Croatia's applications for membership in the European Union and NATO.

== History ==
=== Croatian War of Independence and Margaret Thatcher ===
UK Prime Minister Baroness Margaret Thatcher was one of the most keen advocates of the Croatian independence during the Croatian War of Independence in the 1990s. In an interview for HRT in 1991 she said:

"At first people had been given to understand, wrongly, that it was just a question, serious as though that is, of civil war between two different groups. They needed to be informed that it was between Communist Serbia which has taken control both of the army and of the country, and Democratic Croatia and Slovenia, both of whom had exercised their right to become. I then duly explain that Croatia and Slovenia have no army. They have only got the weapons they can capture and the weapons they can get hold of, and they are entitled to a right of self-defence against those who have attacked them. I said early to people over whom I would have hoped to have had some influence that I thought, as the hostilities got worse and worse and more and more Croatians were being killed and massacred, that it would have been right to recognise Croatia and Slovenia as independent. Then we should have been in a position legally to supply them with arms with which to defend themselves and they would have been in a very much better position, and what is more, Serbia would have known the position the world was taking. Unfortunately that has not happened. But there are many, many friends of Croatia now the situation is more fully realised. (...) I must make it quite clear, in my view, the West should be on the side of liberty and democracy and justice. And the more we can get home to people the true situation, and this is happening in the heart of Europe, and that the cries of the Croatian people are not being heard, the more we can awaken them to the true position. (...) I shall continue myself to put Croatian case and to put it as forcibly as I can."

Baroness Thatcher criticized John Major because of his appeasement to Slobodan Milošević, and the EU because it didn't immediately recognize that Serbia led aggression against Croatia. She said during her speech in the UN in September 1991 that "JNA and Serbia are leading aggression against Croatia. War in Croatia is not a battle of one ethnic group against other but battle of democracy against communism." In her book Statecraft she wrote that "Yugoslavia was authoritarian and totalitarian communist state, a dungeon with a brutal Serb captors that had to fall apart." At the request of the Croatian Ambassador in London Drago Štambuk, Baroness gave a press statement in which he called on the international community to stop the Serbian aggression. According to statement by Mr. Štambuk for Jutarnji list, one of her advisers told her: "Mrs. Thatcher, British government will crucified you because of what you do", to which she replied: "If it is about crucifixion of me or Croatia, then it is better to crucify me. "

She continued to support Croatia in public until 1993 Ahmići massacre because, as she wrote in her book Statecraft, "massacre in Ahmići convinced me that Croatia interpreted my visit to Zagreb as a signal that the world will turn a blind eye to such (Croatian) barbarism." After Srbs committed Srebrenica massacre in 1995, she again contacted Mr. Štambuk and asked him over the phone: "Aren’t they (Serbs) real animals?". She supported Croatian Operation Storm, but wasn't satisfied with President Tuđman's decision to stop near Banja Luka because she thought that he had to defeat remaining Serbian forces. According to the former Croatian US ambassador Miomir Žužul, she told him in 1997:"When you decide to do something in politics, then it should be done by the end or you have to deal with the consequences, good or bad. The worst thing is if you stop halfway. When I went to the Falklands, they all tried to stop me. I knew that I will either succeed or I'm done. But, if I went back I knew for sure that I would be done."

Baroness was awarded with Grand Order of King Dmitar Zvonimir in 1998 for her "exceptional contributions to the independence and integrity of the Republic of Croatia". She visited Zagreb on September 16, 1998, and was awarded with the title "honorary citizen of Zagreb": During her speech she said:

"It is a great pleasure to speak to you here in the ancient capital of your beautiful country. And after the ceremony I have just attended with your city council, I can with pride affirm: “Ja sam Zagrepčanka!“. It is extraordinary to recall how much has changed in the last ten years. Who could have imagined in 1988 that today Croatia would at last have achieved its centuries-long dream of freedom? But then who could have imagined it would be at such a cost? I grieve, as you do, for those who lost their lives, often in the most terrible circumstances. But I share your joy that Croatia at last is whole and free."

=== Post-Independence ===
Croatia's relations with the UK are currently excellent. In March 2007, both countries signed a UK-Croatia Strategic Partnership, by which the United Kingdom fully supported Croatia's European Union and NATO entry bids. Now, both countries are full members of the NATO.

Britain provided both political and practical support to Croatia's efforts to join the EU and NATO. The 2008–09 ‘UK-Croatia Strategic Partnership’ was launched in London on 18 June by Prime Minister Gordon Brown and Prime Minister Ivo Sanader. The UK is provided funding to assist Croatia in its entry bids, projects covered judicial reform, anti-corruption, organised crime, competition policy and food safety.

According to the 2001 UK Census, some 6,992 Croatian born people were living in the UK.

== Economic relations ==
Trade between the United Kingdom and Croatia is governed by the EU–UK Trade and Cooperation Agreement since 1 January 2021.

In 2024, the value of total UK exports to Croatia was £613 million making Croatia UK's 80th largest export market.

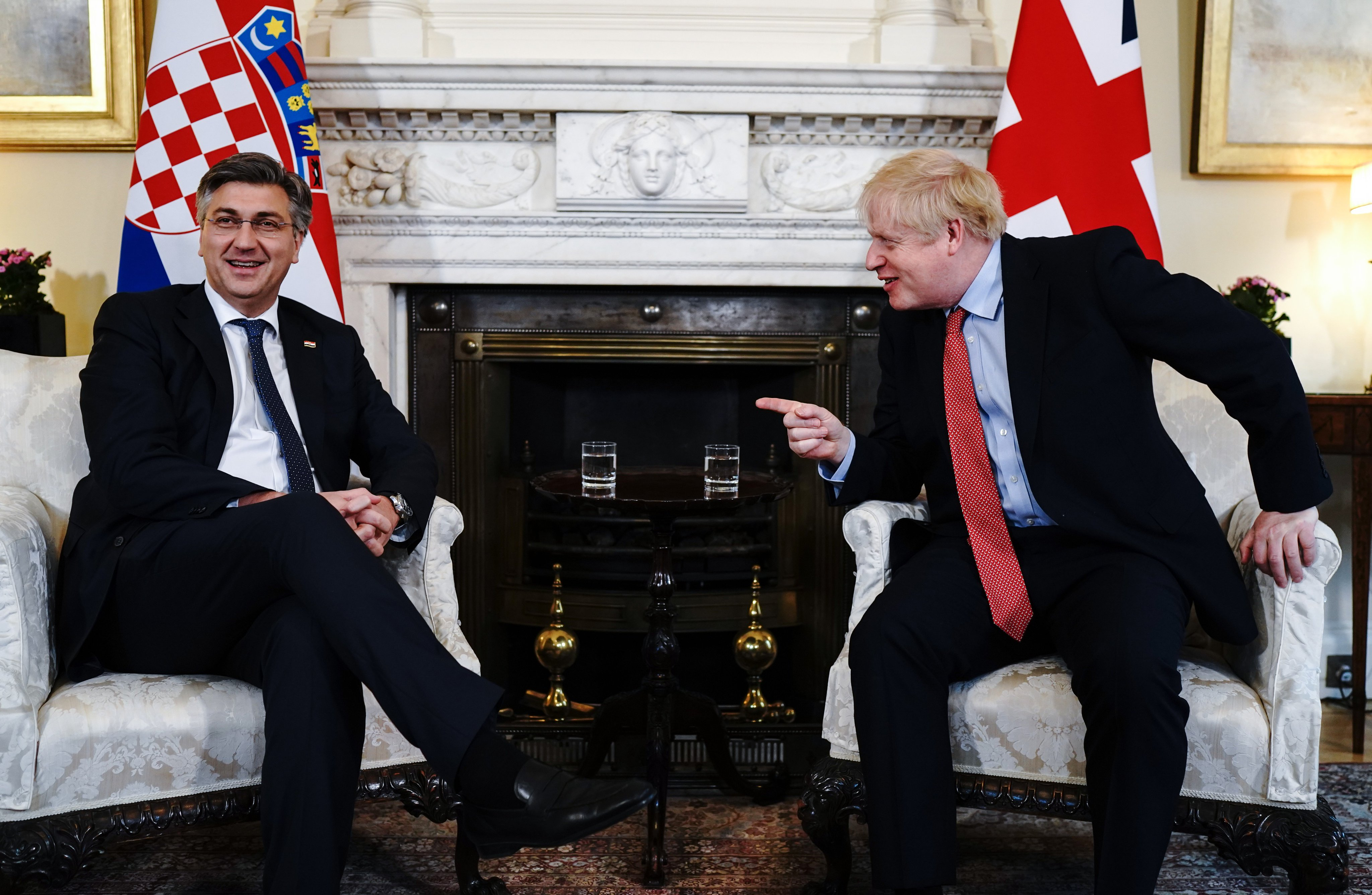
British Prime Minister Boris Johnson meet with Croatian Prime Minister Andrej Plenković at 10 Downing Street, 2020

== Resident diplomatic missions ==
- Croatia has an embassy in London.
- The United Kingdom has an embassy in Zagreb.
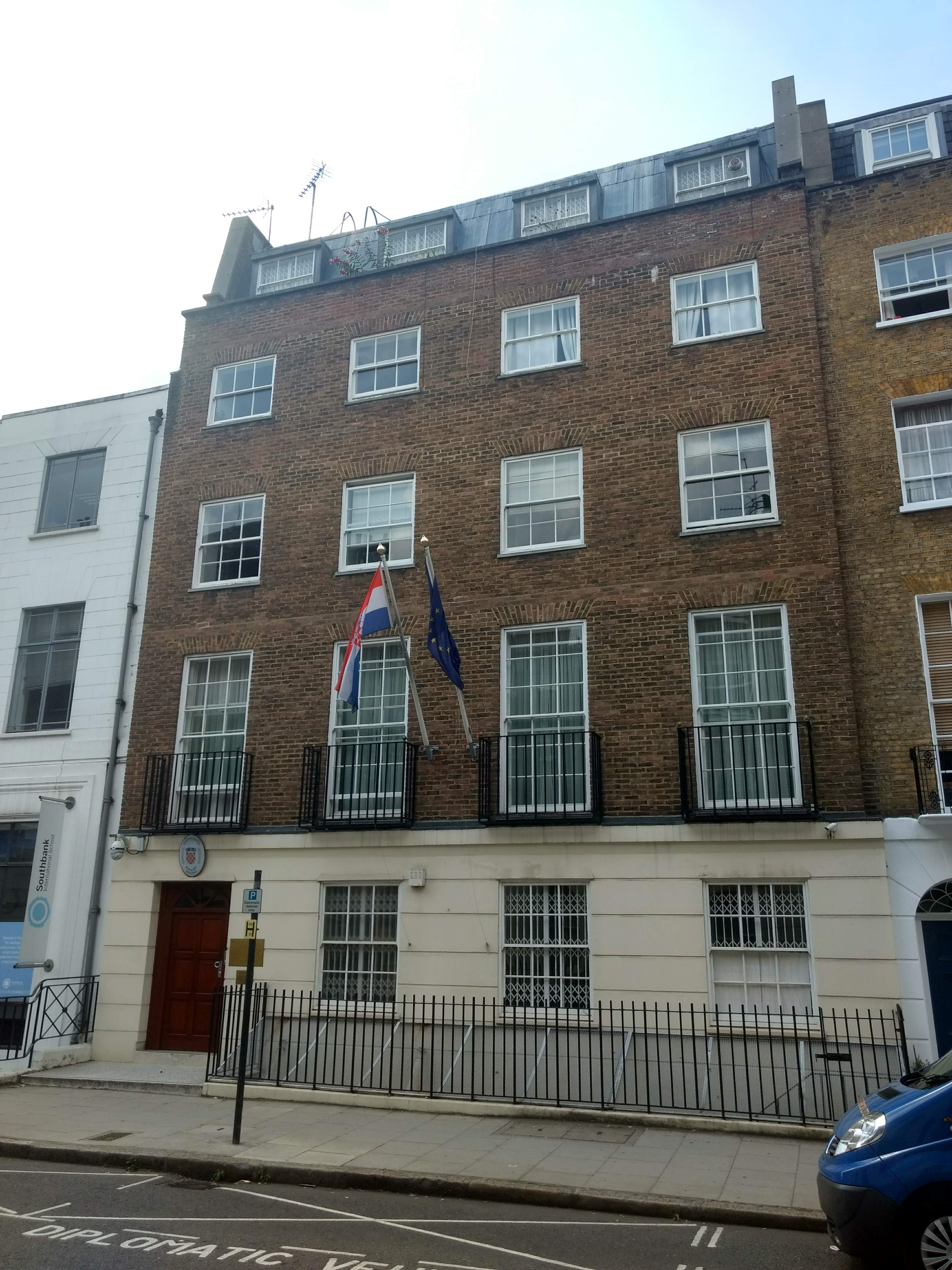
Embassy of Croatia in London

== See also ==
- Foreign relations of Croatia
- Foreign relations of the United Kingdom
- List of Ambassadors of the United Kingdom to Croatia
- United Kingdom–Yugoslavia relations
