= Emma Hopkins (diplomat) =

British diplomat

Her Excellency Emma Hopkins OBE
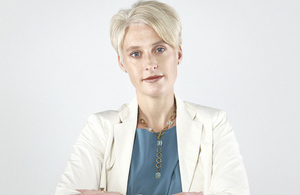

British Ambassador to Denmark
- In office October 2020 – August 2024
- Monarchs: Elizabeth II; Charles III
- Prime Minister: Boris Johnson; Liz Truss; Rishi Sunak; Keir Starmer
- Preceded by: Dominic Schroeder
- Succeeded by: Joëlle Jenny

Personal details
- Spouse: Steven Hopkins
- Children: 2
- Education: Fitzwilliam College, Cambridge
- Occupation: Diplomat

Emma Hopkins OBE is a British diplomat who, from October 2020 until August 2024, served as the British Ambassador to Denmark, and was previously the British Ambassador to Bulgaria from May 2015 to August 2020.

== Personal life ==
Hopkins graduated with a degree in law from Fitzwilliam College, University of Cambridge. She was called to the Bar in 1995 and practised as a barrister until 2001 when she entered public service.

She is married to Steven Hopkins and they have two young daughters.

== Career ==
Hopkins joined the UK civil service in 2001. She led the UK government's Preventing Sexual Violence Initiative (PSVI) to end impunity for sexual violence committed in war. The campaign included the Global Summit to End Sexual Violence in Conflict – which brought together over 125 countries in the largest gathering ever on this topic. She was awarded the Officer of the Most Excellent Order of the British Empire (OBE) in the 2014 Queen's Birthday Honours List, for services to preventing sexual violence in conflict affected countries.

Hopkins was appointed as Her Majesty's Ambassador to Denmark in January 2020, and took up her post in October 2020.
