= Colin Munro (diplomat) =

British diplomat

Colin Andrew Munro CMG (born 24 October 1946) is a former British diplomat.

He was educated at George Watson's College, the University of Edinburgh (MA Modern Languages, 1968) and King's College London (MA, International Studies). He served as British Ambassador to Croatia from 1997 to 2000.

== Honours ==
- Companion of the Order of St Michael and St George (CMG) - 2002

Diplomatic posts
Preceded by Gavin Hewitt	British Ambassador to Croatia; 1997–2000	Succeeded by Nicholas Jarrold
