= List of ambassadors of the United Kingdom to Slovakia =

The ambassador of the United Kingdom to Slovakia is the United Kingdom's foremost diplomatic representative to the Slovak Republic.

Slovakia became an independent state on 1 January 1993 after the peaceful dissolution of Czechoslovakia. From then until 1994 David Brighty, who had been British ambassador to Czechoslovakia, continued as both ambassador to the new Czech Republic and also non-resident ambassador to Slovakia. In 1994 David Brighty was replaced and Michael Bates, who had been chargé d'affaires in Bratislava, became the first resident Ambassador to Slovakia.

== List of heads of mission ==
=== Ambassadors to Czechoslovakia ===
Name	Tenure begin	Tenure end	British monarch	Czechoslovak president
Sir George Clerk	1919	1926	George V	Tomáš Garrigue Masaryk
Sir James Macleay	1926	1930	George V	Tomáš Garrigue Masaryk
Sir Joseph Addison	1930	1936	George V	Tomáš Garrigue Masaryk
Sir Charles Bentinck	1936	1937	George VI	Edvard Beneš
Sir Robert Bruce Lockhart	21 July 1940	1941	George VI	Edvard Beneš
Frank Roberts (Chargé d'affaires)	18 July 1941	1941	George VI	Edvard Beneš
Sir Philip Nichols	27 October 1941	1947	George VI	Edvard Beneš
Sir Pierson Dixon	1948	1950	George VI	Klement Gottwald
Sir Philip Broadmead	1950	1953	George VI	Klement Gottwald
Sir Derwent Kermode	1953	1955	Elizabeth II	Antonín Zápotocký
Sir Clinton Pelham	5 May 1955	1957	Elizabeth II	Antonín Zápotocký
Sir Paul Grey	28 June 1957	1960	Elizabeth II	Antonín Novotný
Sir Cecil Parrott	1960	1966	Elizabeth II	Antonín Novotný
Sir William Barker	1966	1968	Elizabeth II	Antonín Novotný
Sir Howard Smith	1968	1971	Elizabeth II	Ludvík Svoboda
Ronald Scrivener	1971	1974	Elizabeth II	Ludvík Svoboda
Edward Willan	1974	1977	Elizabeth II	Ludvík Svoboda→ Gustáv Husák
Peter Male	1977	1980	Elizabeth II	Gustáv Husák
John Rich	1980	1985	Elizabeth II	Gustáv Husák
Sir Stephen Barrett	1985	1988	Elizabeth II	Gustáv Husák
Laurence O'Keeffe	1988	1991	Elizabeth II	Gustáv Husák→ Václav Havel
David Brighty	1991	1993	Elizabeth II	Václav Havel

=== Ambassadors to Slovakia ===
- 1993–1994: David Brighty
- 1994–1995: Michael Bates
- 1995–1998: Peter Harborne
- 1998–2001: David Lyscom
- 2001–2003: Ric Todd
- 2003–2007: Judith Macgregor
- 2007–2010: Michael Roberts
- 2011 Jan-Aug: Dominic Schroeder chargé d'affaires
- 2011–2013: Susannah Montgomery
- 2013–2014: Gill Fraser chargé d'affaires
- 2014–2020: Andrew Garth
- 2020–2025: Nigel Baker
- 2025–present: Bilal Zahid
