= Calais Conference =

Calais Conference may refer to:

- Calais Conference (July 1915)
- Calais Conference (December 1915)
- Calais Conference (1917)
