= 2026 University of St Andrews Chancellor election =

2026 election of ceremonial head of British university

- 16–22 February 2026
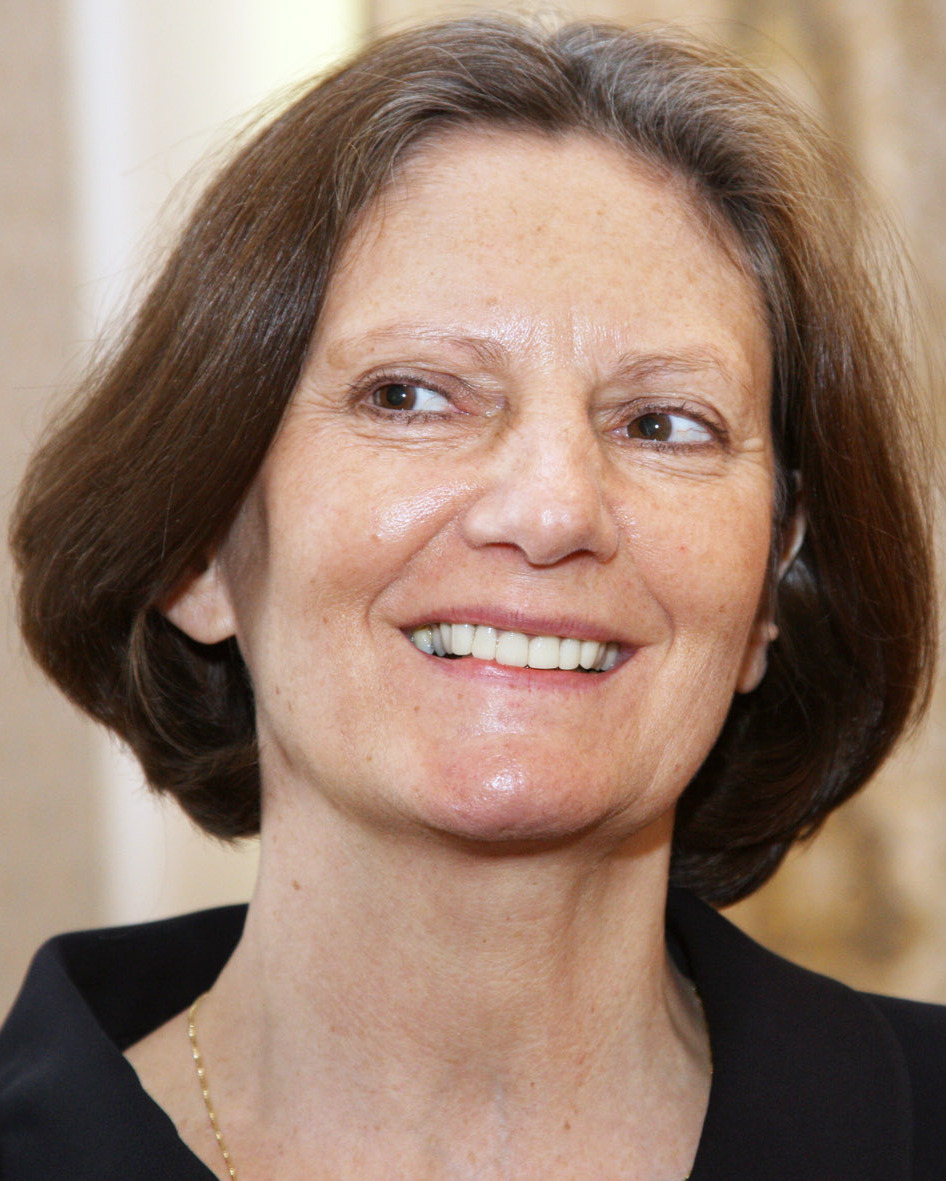

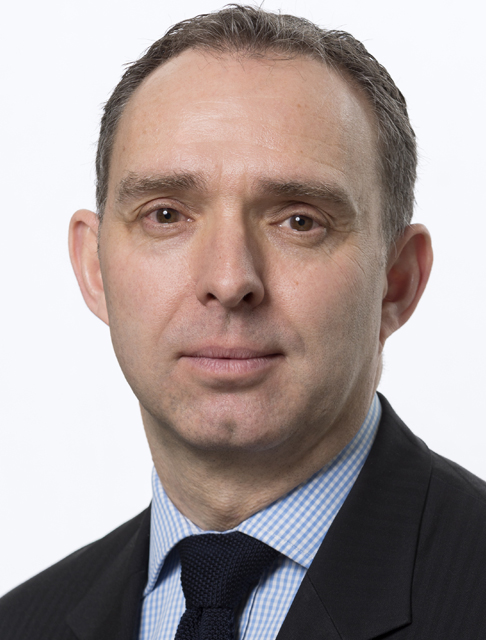

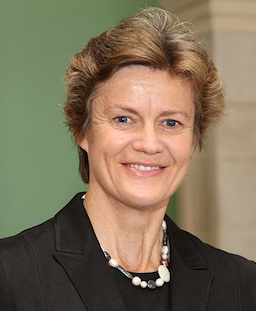

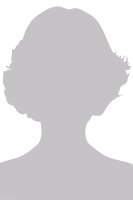
Candidate	Anne Pringle	The Lord Sedwill
Final stage	2,643 (54.4%)	2,215 (45.6%)
Second stage	1,812 (35.6%)	1,807 (35.5%)
First stage	1,601 (30.7%)	1,619 (31.1%)
Candidate	Barbara Woodward	Alexandra Walmsley
Final stage	Eliminated	Eliminated
Second stage	1,475 (29.0%)	Eliminated
First stage	1,251 (24.0%)	739 (14.2%)
Chancellor before election
The Lord Campbell of Pittenweem
Elected Chancellor
Dame Anne Pringle

The 2026 University of St Andrews election for the position of Chancellor became necessary upon the death of the incumbent chancellor, Walter Menzies Campbell, Baron Campbell of Pittenweem. On 24 February, Dame Anne Pringle was announced as the winner of the election. She was installed to the position in July 2026.

From the creation of the position in the 1410s until 2026, every Chancellor of St Andrews had been either a peer or an archbishop, with the notable exception of Sir Kenneth Dover. Other previous holders of the post include royals James, Duke of Ross; Prince Adolphus, Duke of Cambridge; Prince William, Duke of Cumberland; and former prime minister Stanley Baldwin. The term of the appointment following the 2026 election will be for ten years, subject to approval by the Privy Council; previous office holders held life tenure.

== Electorate and voting ==
The electorate was made up of members of the General Council which includes: graduates of the university, members and former members of the University Court, professors and former professors, and other senior academic staff.

Following the uncontested election of Menzies Campbell in 2006, this was the first election conducted through electronic voting, using the alternative vote system. Nominations for the position opened on 1 December 2025 and closed on 9 January 2026, with confirmed candidates announced on 26 January. Voting took place in the third week of Candlemas semester between 16 and 22 February 2026.

== Candidates ==
Candidates were not required to have studied or hold a degree from St Andrews in order to stand for the chancellorship; the most recent Chancellor to have studied at the university was George Gledstanes, appointed in 1604. Candidates were eligible to stand if they received nominations from at least 25 members of the General Council, were not employed by the university or a matriculated student, and if their candidacy did not bring the university into disrepute. Four candidates were confirmed to have met the criteria and were announced on 26 January 2026, all of whom are alumni.

Candidates are listed below in alphabetical order:

Name Degree(s) from St Andrews	Current and former roles	Notes	Campaign
Dame Anne Pringle; Hon. LLD, 2022; MA French and German, 1977	Former British Ambassador to Russia and British Ambassador to the Czech Republic	Former Senior Lay Member (Senior Governor) of the University Court	Notable Supporters – Professor Frances Andrews – Professor Sharon Ashbrook – Professor Paul Boyle – Professor James Naismith – Professor Stuart Monro – Catherine Stihler – Professor Sir David Wallace
Mark Sedwill, Baron Sedwill; Hon. LLD, 2022; BSc Economics, 1987	Former Cabinet Secretary and National Security Advisor of the United Kingdom	Current Non-Executive Member of the University Court	Sedwill for St Andrews; Website Notable Supporters General Council Members – Dame Madeleine Alessandri – Professor Ali Ansari – Very Revd Dr Derek Browning – Sir Ian Diamond – Sir Michael Fallon – Lord Forsyth of Drumlean – Dr Fiona Hill – Alison Johns – Sir Andrew Mackenzie – Professor Ewan McKendrick – Professor Phillips O'Brien – Lord Robertson of Port Ellen – Sir John Rose – Professor Guy Rowlands – Professor Christopher Smith – Lt Gen Sir Edward Smyth-Osbourne – Professor Sir Hew Strachan – Brian Viner – Viscount Younger of Leckie – Sir Alex Younger – Lt Gen Sir Barney White-Spunner; Other Supporters – The Lord Gove – Johnny Mercer: General David Petraeus; – Sir Julian Smith
Lady Walmsley (Note: Lady Walmsley by virtue of her marriage to her late husband); PhD History, 1998; MA History and International Relations, 1993	Defence, security and nuclear consultant		Alex 4 Chancellor; Website
Dame Barbara Woodward; MA History, 1983	Deputy National Security Advisor; Former Permanent Representative of the United Kingdom to the United Nations and British Ambassador to China		Barbara Woodward for Chancellor; Website Notable Supporters – Professor Colin Ballantyne – Hans van Mourik Broekman

The St Andrews student newspaper, The Saint, reported that the election could result in the university's first female Chancellor since the 1410s.

On 12 February, the Free Speech Union and Alumni for Free Speech jointly endorsed both Lord Sedwill and Lady Walmsley as strong free speech candidates based on a questionnaire submitted by the organisations. Both Pringle and Woodward did not respond to the questions. On 13 February, the working day before voting formally began, The Times named Lord Sedwill as the frontrunner for the position.

== Results ==
7,072 members of the General Council registered to vote in the election and a total of 5,210 votes were cast, for a turnout of 73.6%. Results were announced on 24 February 2026 and were as follows:

Candidate	First stage		Second stage			Final stage		
Candidate	Votes	%	Votes	±	%	Votes	±	%
✓ Anne Pringle	1,601	30.7%	1,812	211▲	35.6%	2,643	831▲	54.4%
The Lord Sedwill	1,619	31.1%	1,807	188▲	35.5%	2,215	408▲	45.6%
Barbara Woodward	1,251	24.0%	1,475	224▲	29.0%	Eliminated		
Alexandra Walmsley	739	14.2%	Eliminated					
Votes cast	5,210	100%	5,094	116▼		4,858	236▼	

== See also ==
- Chancellor of the University of St Andrews
- 2024 University of Oxford Chancellor election
- 2025 University of Cambridge Chancellor election
