= Governance of the University of St Andrews =

University governance

Governance of the University of St Andrews is laid down in a series of Acts of Parliament (the Universities (Scotland) Acts) enacted between 1858 and 1966, and the Higher Education Governance (Scotland) Act 2016.

In common with the other ancient universities of Scotland, there are three bodies responsible for governance, as determined by the Universities (Scotland) Act 1858. This act created three bodies: the General Council, University Court and Academic Senate (Senatus Academicus).

The General Council, chaired by the chancellor, represents the interests of all staff and graduates of the university and has an advisory role, but the principal and University Court are required to present an annual report to the General Council. The University Court, chaired by the Rector, is the de jure and de facto supreme governing body of the university with the authority to appoint the Principal, and the power to overrule the Senatus Academicus. The Senatus Academicus, chaired by the Principal, is charged with determining the programmes of teaching for the students and deciding on the regulations for awarding degrees. The Senatus Academicus has de facto responsibility for student discipline, subject to the appellate jurisdiction of the Court.

== General Council ==
The General Council is a standing advisory body of all graduates, academics and former academics of the university. It meets twice a year and appoints a Business Committee to transact business between those meetings. Its most important functions are appointing two Assessors to the University Court and electing the university Chancellor.

== University Court ==
=== Remit and jurisdiction ===
The University Court was established by the Universities (Scotland) Act 1858 as the supreme governing body of the university, in effect the university's board of directors, which has responsibility for the finances and administration of the university. The University Court has the power to overturn decisions made by the Senatus Academicus and all the academic staff of the university are de jure appointed by the Court, but de facto such decisions are made by the Principal and the Academic Council.

=== Membership ===
At its creation, the Court had a small membership representing the Chancellor, Rector, Principal and Senate, but with the Universities (Scotland) Act 1966, non-professorial staff were added to the Court. The Court maintains a significant majority of members drawn from within, or appointed by those within, the university community itself. The only person appointed from outside the university is the Assessor of the Provost of Fife Council. Six of the eight co-opted members could come from beyond the university community.

The Court is chaired by the Rector who is elected by all the matriculated students of the university and is the ordinary president of the Court.

The membership of the Court was set by Court Ordinance No. 121 of May 2002 (as approved by the Privy Council of the United Kingdom) which is:

- the Rector (elected by matriculated students, and is President of the Court)
- the Principal, ex officio
- the Senior Vice Principal, ex officio
- the Chancellor's Assessor (nominated by the Chancellor)
- the Rector's Assessor (nominated by the Rector)
- the Provost of Fife's Assessor (nominated by the Provost of Fife Council)
- two assessors elected by the General Council
- four Academic Senate assessors
- a non-teaching staff member (elected by and from this constituency)
- the president of the Students' Association, ex officio
- the director of education of the Students' Association, ex officio
- eight persons co-opted by the court (to include at least two alumni)

=== Rector ===
The rector of the University of St Andrews is the ordinary president of the University Court and is chosen every three years by the matriculated students of the university. The office of Rector was created by the Parliament of the United Kingdom when it passed the Universities (Scotland) Act 1858, which regulated academic governance and provided for the election of a Rector at all of the universities in existence at the time in Scotland. To this day it is only the four ancient universities of Scotland: University of St Andrews, University of Glasgow, University of Aberdeen, and University of Edinburgh, as well as the University of Dundee, that elect a rector, whereas modern universities do not.

=== Senior governor ===
The university created the position of senior governor to undertake the other responsibilities of a chairman of a board, to ensure that the Court fulfils its responsibility of superintending the university's officials, and enabling the effective functioning of the Court's committee. The senior governor is selected by the Court from among its lay members (those members who come from outside the university community.) In 2016, the Scottish Parliament mandated that a senior lay member be appointed for the governing body of, in Section 1 of the Higher Education Governance (Scotland) Act 2016. At the same time, the 2016 Act affirmed the continued position of rector as president of the court.

The rector, when present, will preside over meetings of the Court but may not otherwise normally be involved in Court business in the way that a company chairman might be. They have a more active role in the business of court. They have become de jure the working president of the court.

As of May 2017 the Senior Governor is Dame Anne Pringle DCMG, who was appointed in August 2016 and is an alumna of the university.

== Academic Senate ==
=== Remit and jurisdiction ===
The Senatus Academicus is the supreme academic body under the presidency of the University Principal. It consists of all professors, deans of faculties, heads of school, a number of elected non-professorial members of staff, and four student members. Another function of the Senate is the discipline of students. Under the Sponsio Academica the Senate has the power to expel a student should they bring the university into disrepute. However, the full Senatus Academicus has not met as a governing body since 1995, with only ceremonial meetings taking place, such as graduation. Much of the Senate's business is delegated to a smaller body, the Academic Council.

=== Principal's Office ===
The principal of the University of St Andrews is the chief executive of the university and is assisted in that role by several key officers. The principal is analogous to a vice-chancellor in England or a president of an American university.

As of 23 October 2018, the members of the Principal's Office were:

- Principal: Professor Sally Mapstone
- Master of the United College: Professor Garry Taylor
- Quaestor and Factor: Derek Watson FCCA
- Vice-Principal Education (Proctor): Professor Phil Hibbert
- Vice-Principal (Governance): Alastair Merrill
- Vice-Principal (International Strategy and External Relations): Professor Brad MacKay
- Vice-Principal (Research and Innovation): Professor Derek Woollins FRSC FRSE
- Assistant Vice-Principal (Collections and Digital Content): Dr Katie Stevenson

=== Faculties ===
The university is divided into four Faculties – Arts, Divinity, Science, and Medicine. Each one is governed by a Faculty Council comprising all permanent members of academic staff in each school in the Faculty (members of cross-faculty schools may attend either or both Faculty Councils). These Faculty Councils, in association with the Senatus Academicus, are ultimately responsible inter alia for the approval of new undergraduate and postgraduate courses and for overseeing the monitoring of the progress of students. The Deans of Faculties and other faculty officers, including those responsible for postgraduate matters, are elected by the Faculty Councils.

The Faculty Councils meet once annually, towards the end of each academic year.

=== Teaching, Learning and Assessment Committee ===
The routine business of the Faculties is conducted throughout the year by the Teaching, Learning and Assessment (TLA) Committee, a standing committee reporting to the Senate, and by the Faculty Business Committees. The Faculty Business Committees, comprising the Faculty officers and any other co-opted members, meet in advance of each TLA committee to dispatch routine affairs and review issues arising from the implementation of policy or course proposals, highlighting issues that may need discussion in the wider forum of the TLA.

== Planning and Resources Committee ==
The Planning and Resources Committee is a joint committee of both the University Court and the Senatus Academicus and attempts to bring a unified approach to both academic and financial planning. The Planning and Resources Committee has student representation with the president and director of education of the University of St Andrews Students' Association.

== Student representation ==
=== Students' Representative Council ===
Students are represented by the statutory students' representative council, which was instituted by the Universities (Scotland) Act 1889 The Students' Representative Council is currently part of University of St Andrews Students' Association, and has representatives elected from undergraduate and postgraduate students.

=== Election of Rector ===
All matriculated students of the university have the right to vote in the election of the Rector, who holds office for a three-year period, and is President of the University Court. The Rector appoints the Rector's Assessor who is also a member of the University Court, and since 1970 the Rector has appointed a student as Assessor. The Rector's Assessor is a member of the Students' Representative Council. The President and Director of Education of the Students' Association are members of the University Court.

=== University committees and councils ===
The president, Arts & Divinity Faculty president, Science & Medicine Faculty president, and the postgraduate academic convenor are members of the Senatus Academicus and the Academic Council. The president of the Students' Association is a member of the Senate Business Committee, which is responsible for considering business for the Senate and Academic Council, and for establishing working groups or commissioning reports. The Students' Representative Council itself exists to represent students on all matters and is the recognised channel of communication between students and University authorities.

== See also ==
- Regent House – governing body of the University of Cambridge
- Congregation – governing body of the University of Oxford
- Convocation
