= Questor =

Questor may refer to:

- Quaestor, an ancient Roman official
- Questor (Busch Gardens Tampa), a defunct ride at Busch Gardens Tampa, Florida, US
- The Questor Tapes, a 1974 TV movie, featuring an android named Questor, by Gene Roddenberry
- Questor the Elf, a character in the 1985 Atari arcade game Gauntlet
- Questor Thews, a character in the Magic Kingdom of Landover novels by Terry Brooks
- Questor Educational Products Company, a former toy company now owned by Hasbro

== See also ==
- 1971 Questor Grand Prix, a one-off Formula One race at Ontario Motor Speedway, California, US
- Quaestor (disambiguation)
- Questore, a rank of the Italian Police force
- The Questors Theatre, London, England
