= Chancellor of the University of St Andrews =

Titular head of the University of St Andrews

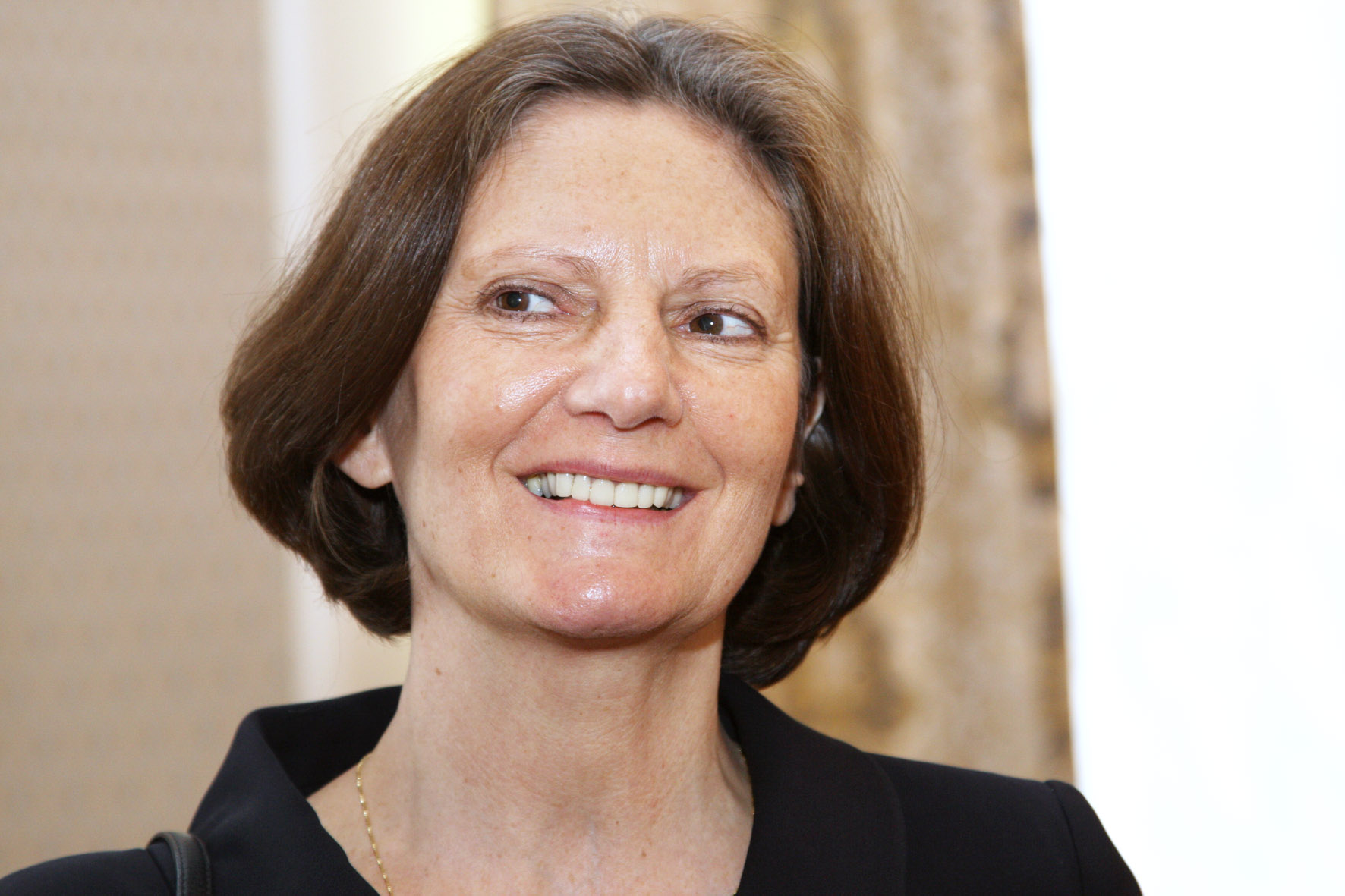
- Incumbent; Dame Anne Pringle since 24 February 2026
- Member of: General Council
- Appointer: Elected by the members of the General Council
- Term length: Life tenure
- Constituting instrument: Universities (Scotland) Act 1858
- First holder: Henry Wardlaw, Bishop of St Andrews
- Deputy: Vice-Chancellor
- Salary: sinecure
- Website: Chancellor of the University of St Andrews

The Chancellor of the University of St Andrews is the titular head of the University of St Andrews. Their duties include conferring degrees, promoting the university's image throughout the world, and furthering the university's interests worldwide. The Chancellor does have the power to refuse an "improvement in the internal arrangements of the University", however, there is no evidence of any Chancellor using this effective veto over the University Court.

The Office of the Chancellor has existed since the foundation of the university in the 15th century, and no comprehensive definition of its powers has been made in any modern statute. The remit and powers of the Chancellor were described by Royal Commission on the Universities and Colleges of Scotland, which described the Chancellor of St Andrews thus:

"The Chancellor is the Head of the University... He is consulted, however, on all public matters relative to its welfare, and he is also Conservator of its privileges. By the foundation charters the power of conferring degrees is vested in him: but this he may exercise either personally when present or by his depute when absent, with the advice of the doctors and masters of the University".

— Order XLIX, Commission for Visiting the Universities and Colleges of Scotland

Section 2 of the Universities (Scotland) Act 1858 provided that the Chancellor is to be elected by the General Council, to hold office for life, although Sir Kenneth Dover retired in 2005. The term of the appointment following the 2026 election will be for ten years, subject to approval by the Privy Council. With the exception of Dover, every Chancellor of the university until 2025 was either an archbishop or a peer. The Chancellor is the President of the General Council, which meets twice each year, in recent years once in St Andrews and once elsewhere in the United Kingdom.

The Chancellor appoints an Assessor to be a member of the university's governing body, the University Court.

== List of chancellors of the University of St Andrews ==
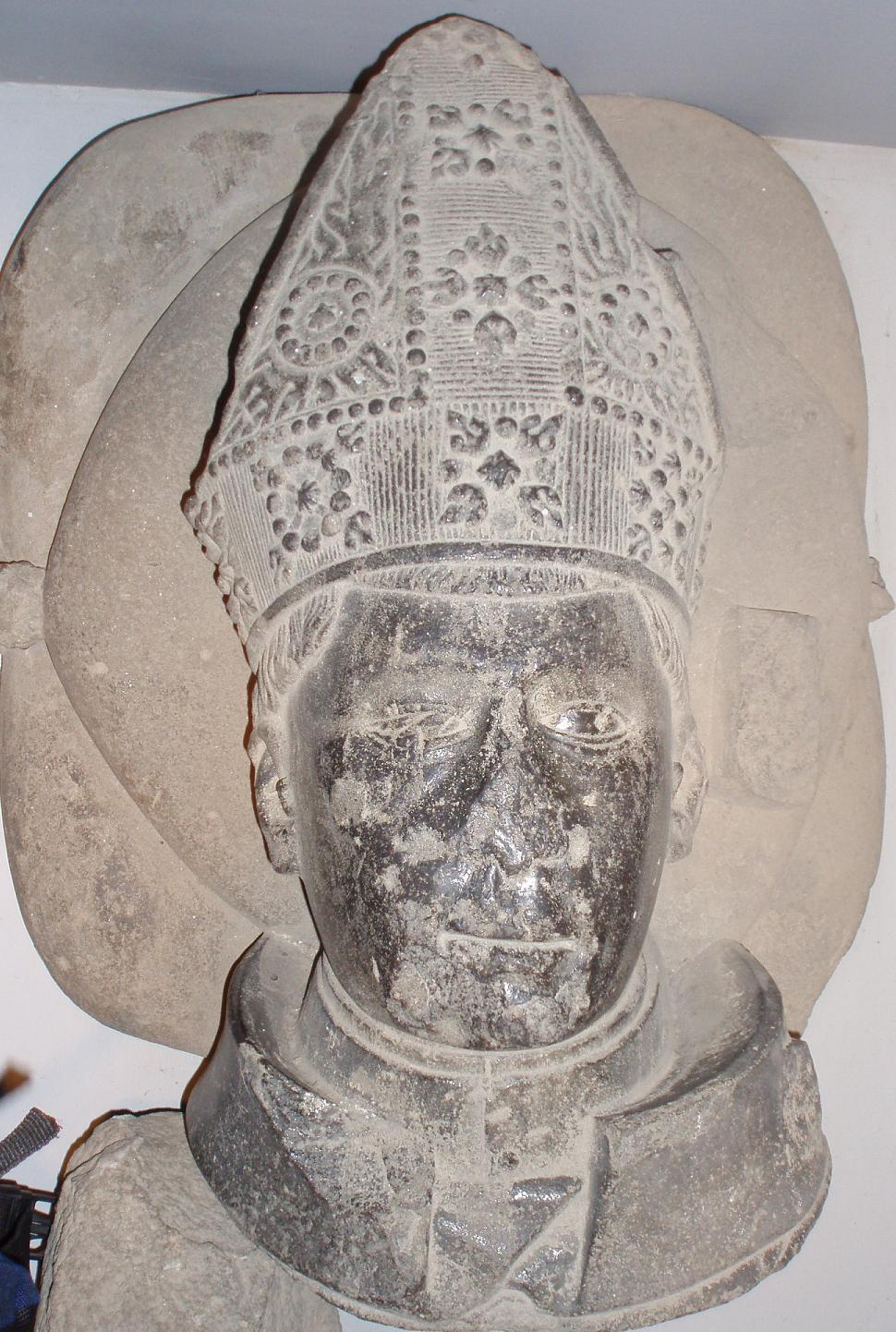
Bishop Henry Wardlaw, the first chancellor of St Andrews

- 1413–1440 Henry Wardlaw, Bishop of St Andrews
- 1440–1465 James Kennedy, Bishop of St Andrews
- 1465–1478 Patrick Graham, Archbishop of St Andrews
- 1478–1497 William Scheves, Archbishop of St Andrews
- 1497–1504 James, Duke of Ross, Archbishop of St Andrews
- 1504–1513 Alexander Stewart, Archbishop of St Andrews
- 1514–1521 Andrew Forman, Archbishop of St Andrews
- 1522–1539 James Beaton, Archbishop of St Andrews
- 1539–1546 David Beaton, Archbishop of St Andrews
- 1547–1571 John Hamilton, Archbishop of St Andrews
- 1572–1574 John Douglas, Archbishop of St Andrews
- 1576–1592 Patrick Adamson, Archbishop of St Andrews
- 1592–1595 John Maitland, 1st Lord Maitland of Thirlestane
- 1597–1598 John Lindsay of Balcarres, Lord Menmuir
- 1599–1604 John Graham, 3rd Earl of Montrose
- 1604–1615 George Gledstanes, Archbishop of St Andrews
- 1615–1639 John Spottiswoode, Archbishop of St Andrews
- 1643–1661 John Campbell, 1st Earl of Loudoun
- 1661–1679 James Sharp, Archbishop of St Andrews
- 1679–1684 Alexander Burnet, Archbishop of St Andrews
- 1684–1689 Arthur Ross, Archbishop of St Andrews
- 1697–1724 John Murray, 1st Duke of Atholl
- 1724–1744 James Brydges, 1st Duke of Chandos
- 1746–1765 Prince William Augustus, Duke of Cumberland
- 1765–1787 Thomas Hay, 9th Earl of Kinnoull
- 1788–1811 Henry Dundas, 1st Viscount Melville
- 1811–1814 Prince Adolphus Frederick, Duke of Cambridge
- 1814–1851 Robert Dundas, 2nd Viscount Melville
- 1851–1900 George Douglas Campbell, 8th Duke of Argyll
- 1900–1922 Alexander Hugh Bruce, 6th Lord Balfour of Burleigh
- 1922–1928 Douglas Haig, 1st Earl Haig of Bemersyde
- 1928 Richard Burdon Haldane, 1st Viscount Haldane
- 1929–1947 Stanley Baldwin, 1st Earl Baldwin of Bewdley
- 1948–1973 Douglas Douglas-Hamilton, 14th Duke of Hamilton
- 1973–1980 Bernard Edward Fergusson, Brigadier Lord Ballantrae
- 1981–2005 Sir Kenneth Dover
- 2006–2025 Walter Menzies Campbell, Baron Campbell of Pittenweem
- 2026−present Dame Anne Pringle

== See also ==
- 2026 University of St Andrews Chancellor election
- Ancient university governance in Scotland
- Governance of the University of St Andrews
- Principal of the University of St Andrews
- Rector of the University of St Andrews
