= Michael Burton (diplomat) =

British diplomat (born 1937)

Sir Michael St Edmund Burton KCVO CMG (born 1937) is a retired British diplomat.

== Biography ==
Born on 18 October 1937, Burton was educated at Bedford School and Magdalen College, Oxford, and joined the Foreign and Commonwealth Office in 1960.

He was British Minister in Berlin, 1985–1992, acting as Deputy Commandant to the British Military Government, 1985–1990, and Head of the British Embassy Office, 1990–1992; Assistant Under-Secretary of State at the Foreign Office (Middle East), 1993; and British Ambassador to the Czech Republic, 1994–1997.

== Positions held ==
Diplomatic posts
Preceded by David Brighty	Ambassador to the Czech Republic; 1994–1997	Succeeded by David Broucher
