= Calais Conference (December 1915) =

1915 Anglo-French political conference

The Calais Conference took place in the French city on 4 December 1915. It was the second Anglo-French political conference in Calais that year, following a conference on war strategy in July. The December conference focussed mainly on the issue of whether to continue the war on the Salonika Front. The British, under prime minister H. H. Asquith, foreign secretary Edward Grey and secretary of state for war Lord Kitchener favoured evacuation of the front following the loss of Serbia to Bulgarian occupation, the French under prime minister Aristide Briand, favoured continuing the effort.

At the conference, the British persuaded Briand to accept evacuation but, amid a political furore, he changed his mind and altered the record of the conference to remove his assent. The decision was also unpopular in Britain, with minister of munitions David Lloyd George threatening to resign from government if the evacuation proceeded. Fearing the collapse of the French government, Asquith sent Kitchener and Grey to Paris to discuss the matter. The pair agreed that the British would support a continuation of the Salonika front which was reinforced and remained active until the end of the war in late 1918.

== Background ==
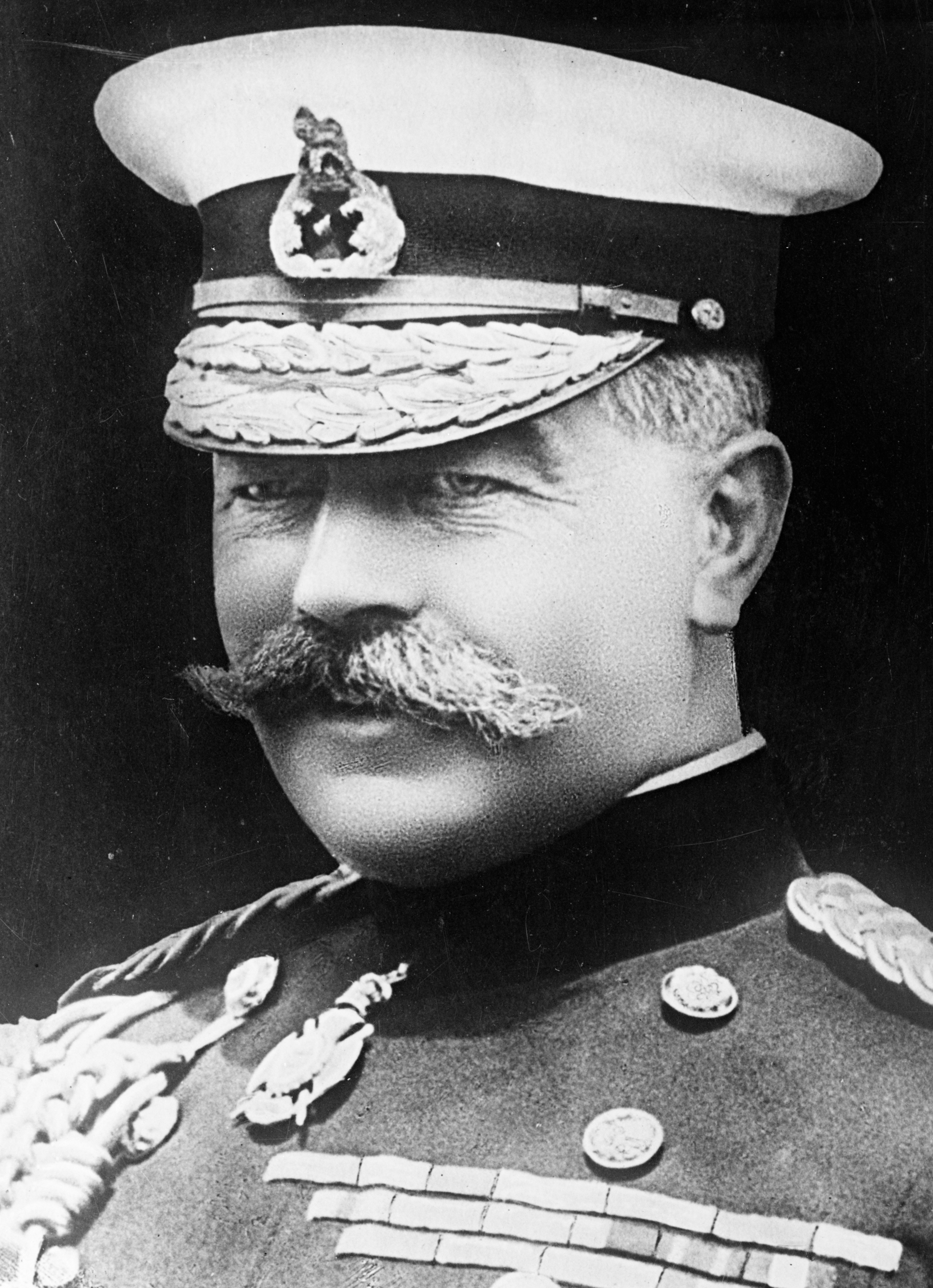
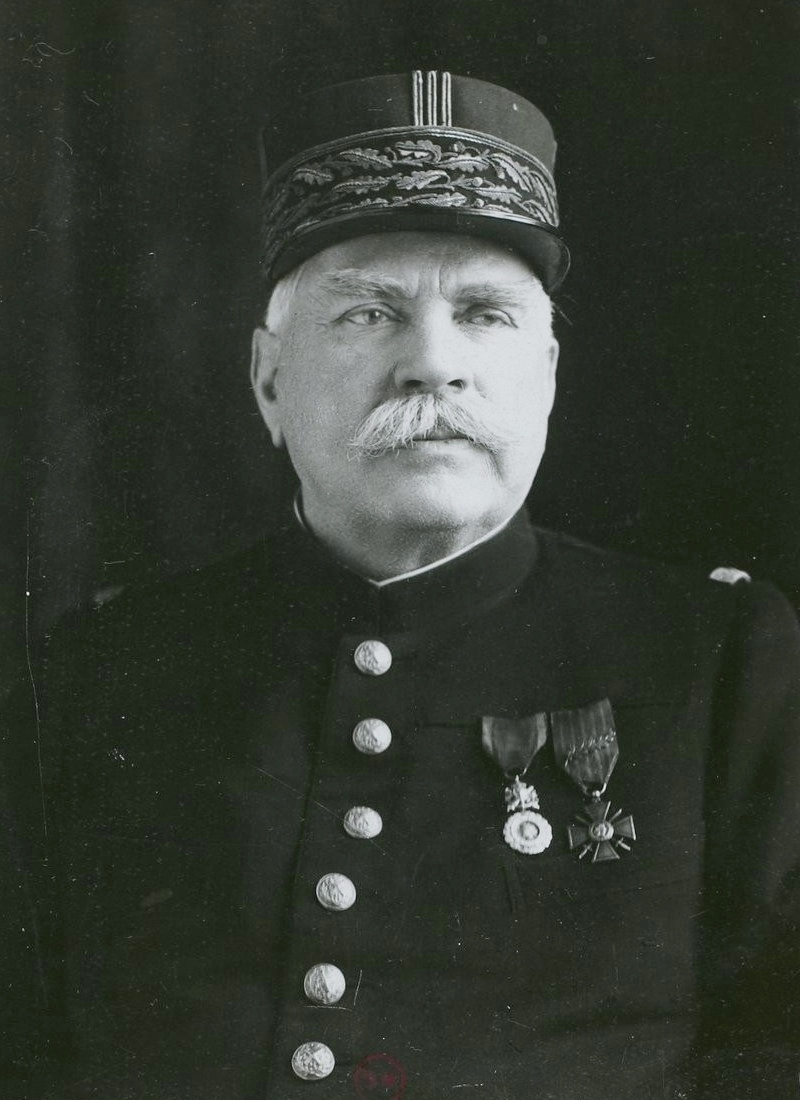
Kitchener and Joffre

The first Calais Conference had been held on 6 July 1915 as an attempt to improve decision making on First World War strategy between the French and British governments. The conference was the first face-to-face meeting between the British prime minister H. H. Asquith and his French counterpart René Viviani. It was somewhat chaotic and ended in a misunderstanding over the agreed strategy, with the British favouring increased effort in the Gallipoli campaign and the French a renewed offensive on the Western Front.

Since that conference Viviani had resigned and been replaced by Aristide Briand. A new fighting front had also been opened up, the Salonika front, intended to support Serbia against German and Austrian attack. The political objective of that front became irrelevant after the intervention of Bulgaria on the side of the Central Powers and the resultant occupation of Serbia. A secondary objective, to draw Greece to the Allies, was thwarted by opposition from their king Constantine.

French army commander-in-chief Joseph Joffre was opposed to the continuation of the Salonika front but was required publicly to support it as it was a matter of political importance to Briand's government. British foreign secretary Edward Grey and secretary of state for war Lord Kitchener both favoured evacuation of Allied troops from the front and refocussing of efforts elsewhere.

Briand's government refused to accept evacuation and requested British reinforcements to expand the Salonika front. On 3 December Kitchener informed the British cabinet that he considered evacuation inevitable or else the entire British force was at danger of being lost. He threatened to resign if it did not take place and the cabinet was persuaded to support Kitchener's position.

== Conference ==
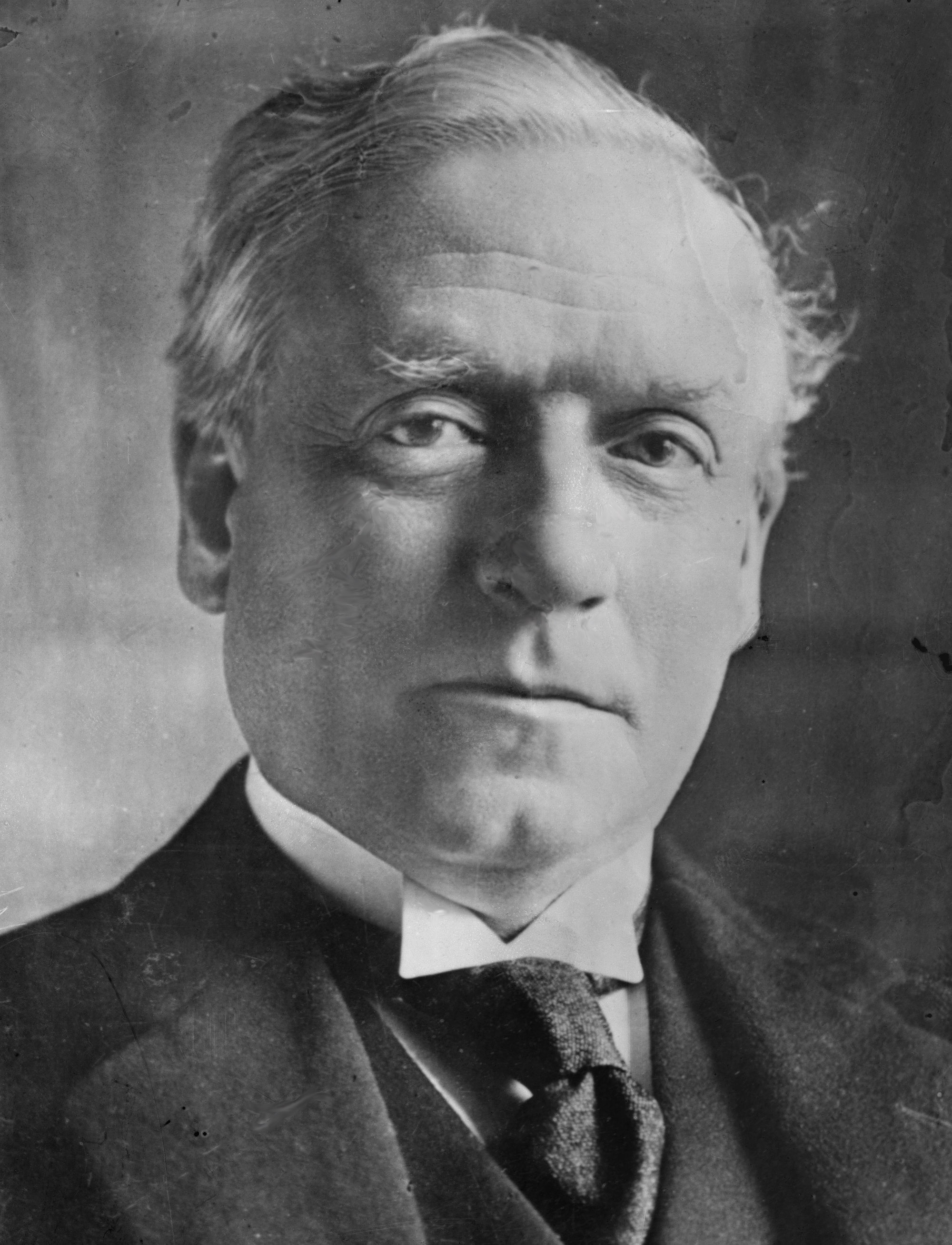
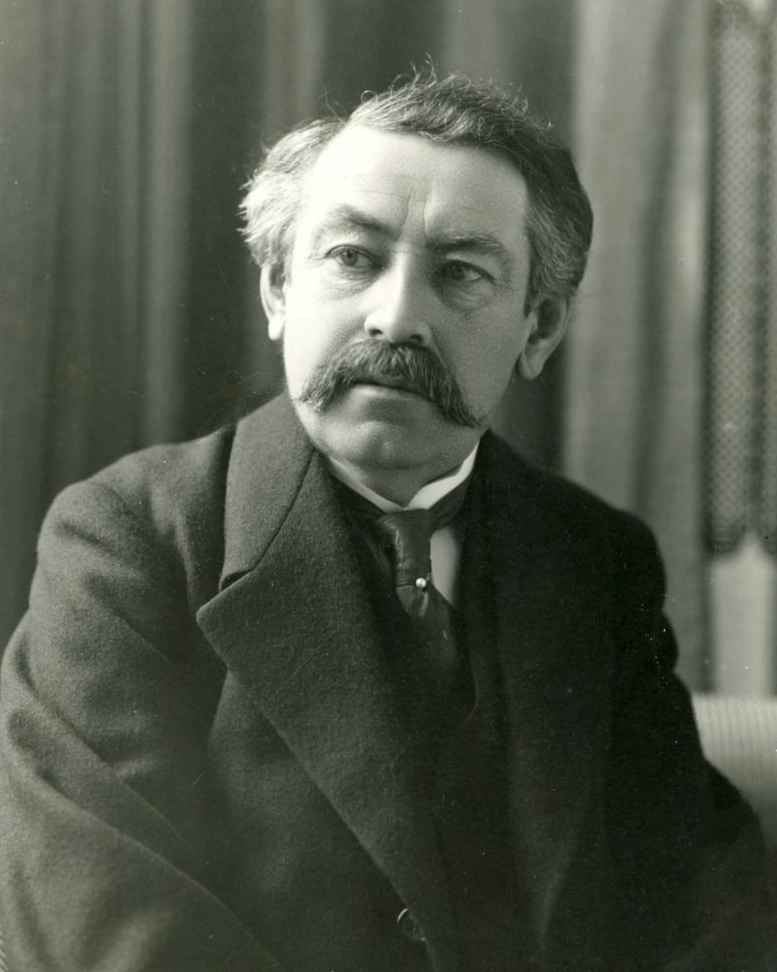
Asquith and Briand

A political conference to discuss war strategy was held at Calais on 4 December 1915. The senior political representatives were Asquith and Briand and the conference was presided over by Kitchener. The conference came at a time when Allied armies on all fronts were stalled, with little offensive success. The chief matter for discussion was that of the Salonika front. Briand spoke for the continuation of efforts in Salonika and Kitchener and Asquith spoke against it. Kitchener repeated his threat to resign and the French were persuaded to accept the British position and agree to evacuation of the front, though Briand continued to insist that this was a mistake.

== Aftermath ==
As at the first conference, the December Calais Conference was followed by a meeting of British and French military leaders at the French army's Grand Quartier Général in Chantilly. An agreement was reached at this meeting to coordinate Allied attacks to prevent the Germans from having time to move reinforcements between threatened portions of the line.

The decision to evacuate the Salonika front proved politically dangerous to Briand, whose young government almost collapsed over the matter. He personally altered the record of the conference's proceedings to indicate that he had not accepted the British position on evacuation but merely noted their intent. The matter was also much debated in Britain with minister of munitions David Lloyd George threatening to resign from Asquith's government if the evacuation took place.

The British ambassador to France, Francis Bertie, reported to Asquith that Briand's government was in danger of collapse over the proposed evacuation. At a meeting of the British government's War Committee Kitchener and Grey were granted full authority to meet with French government figures in Paris to decide the matter. They did so and agreed on a continuation of the Salonika front, with British troops to remain. This decision was confirmed in a meeting of the British cabinet on 14 December. British and French troops endured a freezing winter in the Balkans and were pushed back into Greece in 1916. The front expanded in later years of the war, with more than 200,000 British troops in the field as part of the British Salonika Army, but suffered heavily from disease. There was little progress until the final months of the war, in September 1918, when the Bulgarian army was pushed back and surrendered.

One outcome of the conference was that it led to the establishment of a "standing committee of advisory character" to co-ordinate Allied war strategy; this is considered a forerunner of the Supreme War Council. A permanent secretariat for the body, advocated by British diplomat George Clerk, could not be formed due to opposition from Briand and the French foreign ministry.
