= Anne Pringle =

British diplomat (born 1955)

Dame Anne Pringle DCMG
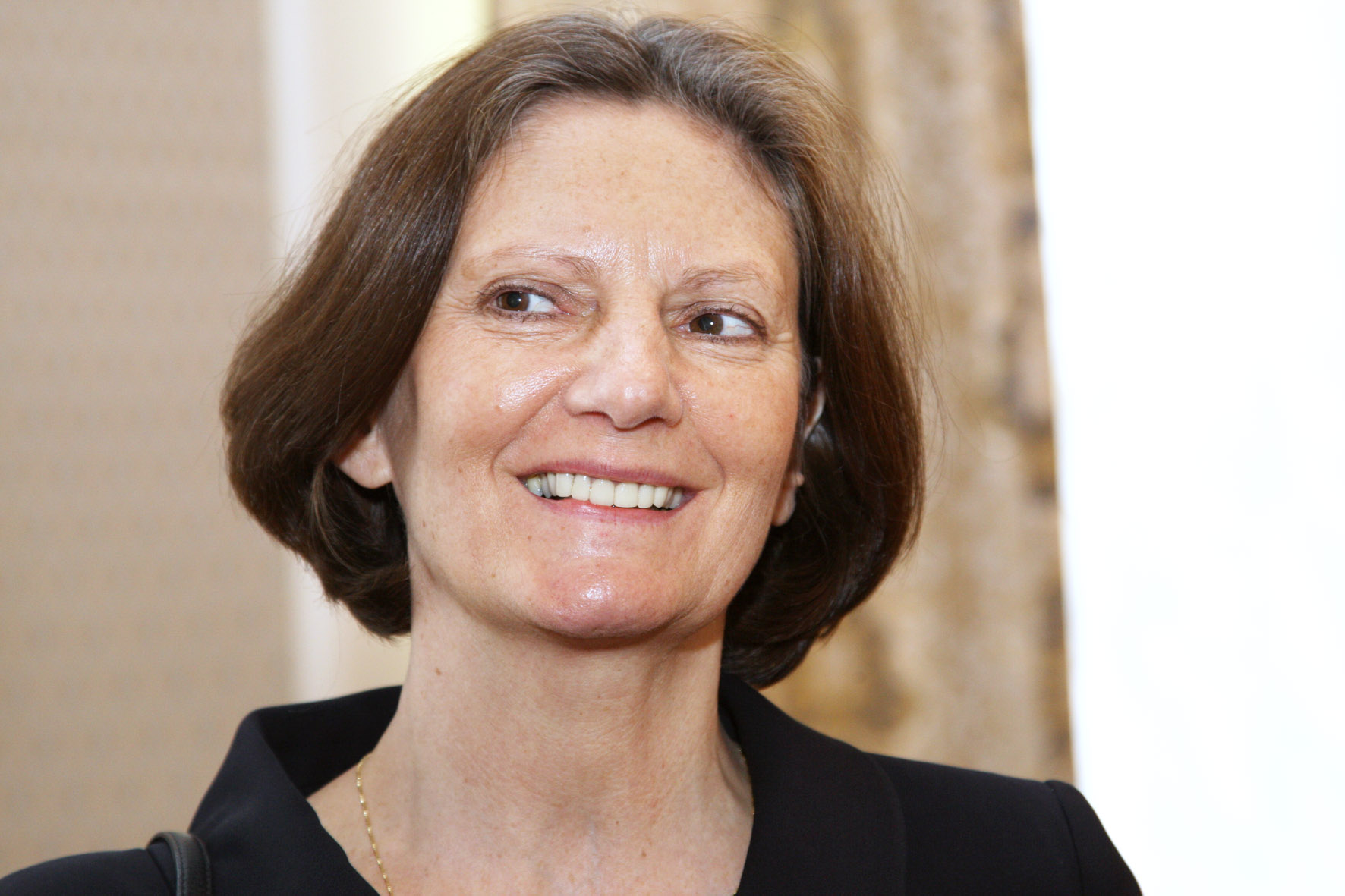
- Dame Anne in April 2009

Chancellor of the University of St Andrews
- Incumbent
- Assumed office 24 February 2026
- Vice-Chancellor: Dame Sally Mapstone
- Preceded by: The Lord Campbell of Pittenweem

British Ambassador to Russia
- In office 28 March 2008 – 1 November 2011
- Prime Minister: Gordon Brown; David Cameron
- Preceded by: Tony Brenton
- Succeeded by: Tim Barrow

British Ambassador to the Czech Republic
- In office 2001–2004
- Prime Minister: Tony Blair
- Preceded by: David Broucher
- Succeeded by: Linda Duffield

Personal details
- Born: 13 January 1955 (age 71) Glasgow, Scotland, United Kingdom
- Education: University of St Andrews

Dame Anne Fyfe Pringle DCMG (born 13 January 1955) is a British diplomat and the former HM Ambassador of the United Kingdom to the Russian Federation. From 2001 to 2004, Pringle was the British ambassador to the Czech Republic. In 2026, she was elected to serve as Chancellor of the University of St Andrews in Scotland.

== Early life ==
Pringle was born in Glasgow, Scotland, and attended the Glasgow High School for Girls. She then studied at the University of St Andrews, graduating with a degree in French and German in 1977.

== Career ==
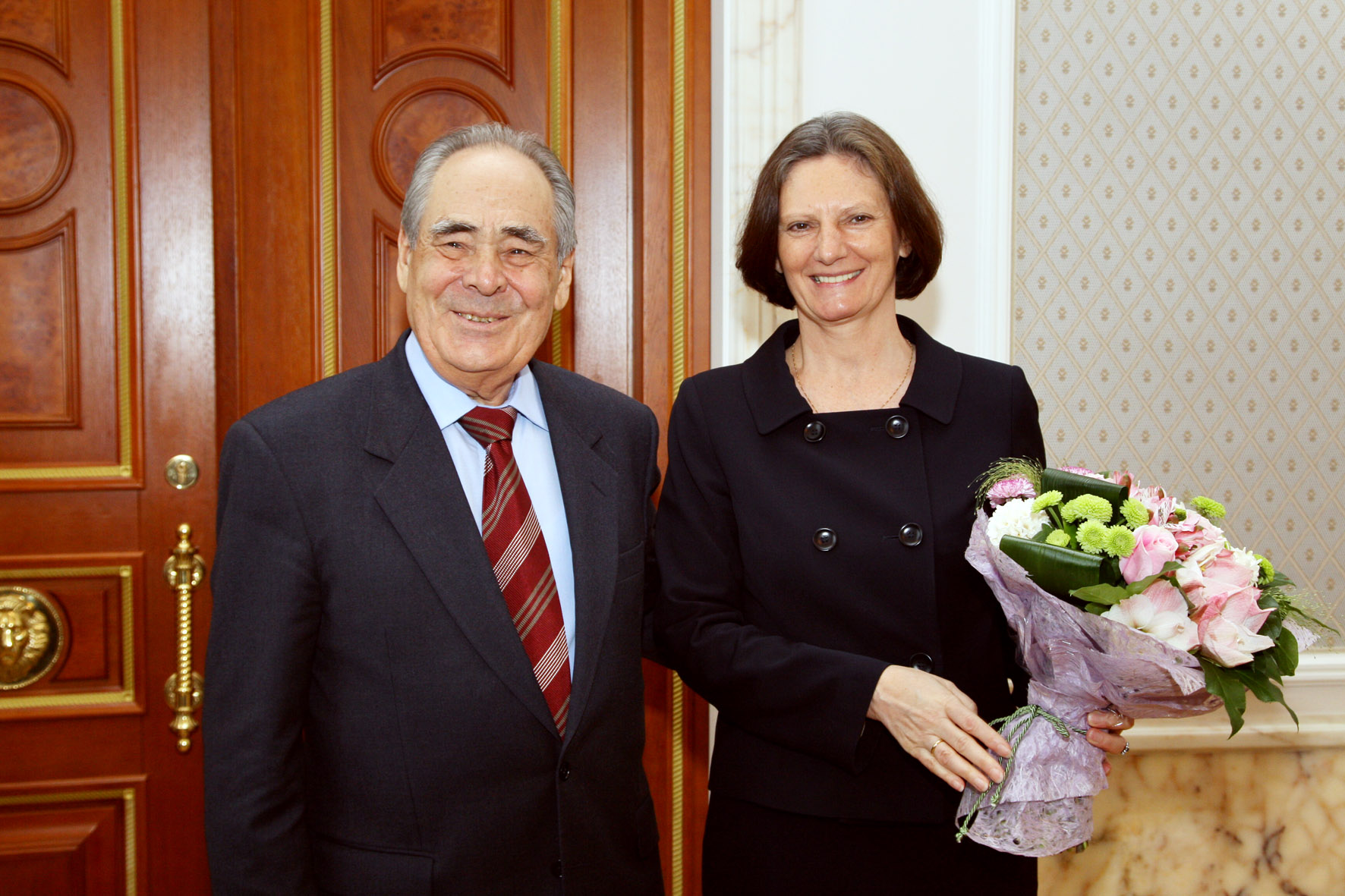
Pringle with the President of Tatarstan, Mintimer Shaimiev, in 2009

After graduation, Pringle entered the Foreign and Commonwealth Office (FCO), where she held various appointments to the United States, Moscow and Brussels (European Union). Her first senior posting was as Head of the FCO’s Common Foreign and Security Policy Department, and her first ambassadorial posting was as ambassador to the Czech Republic from 2001 to 2004. She was the British ambassador to Russia from 2008 to 2011, the first woman to hold the position in its 450-year history.

In 2015, Pringle chaired an advisory panel to select the new HM Chief Inspector of Prisons. The panel, which included two active Conservative Party members (Lord Henley and Amanda Sater), unanimously recommended a single candidate after interviewing shortlisted applicants. However, the Justice Secretary, Chris Grayling, rejected the recommendation, citing a desire for a greater choice of candidates, and ordered a full rerun of the process.

Critics, including former Liberal Democrat MP Sir Alan Beith (then chair of the Commons Justice Select Committee), highlighted a lack of transparency in disclosing the panel's composition beforehand and argued that the inclusion of politically active members undermined public confidence in the process's independence.

Pringle served as a director of Ashmore Group Plc from 2013 to 2021.

Pringle is a Patron of Kew Gardens and Glyndebourne Opera.

Between 2016 and 2020, Pringle was a Senior Governor (now Senior Lay Member) on the Court of the University of St Andrews, and as such was the working chairperson of the University Court, presiding over meetings of the Court in the absence of the Rector. In 2026 she was elected to serve as Chancellor of the University for a ten-year term.

== Honours and awards ==
Awarded a Companion of the Order of St Michael and St George (CMG) in 2004, Pringle advanced to become a Dame Commander of the Order of St Michael and St George (DCMG) in the 2010 New Year Honours.

She received honorary doctorates from Heriot-Watt University in 2010 and the University of St Andrews in 2022.

Diplomatic posts
Preceded by Tony Brenton	British Ambassador to Russia; 2008–2011	Succeeded by Tim Barrow
Preceded by David Broucher	British Ambassador to the Czech Republic; 2001–2004	Succeeded by Linda Duffield
Academic offices
Preceded by Menzies Campbell, Baron Campbell of Pittenweem	Chancellor of the University of St Andrews; 2026–present	Incumbent
