= Calais Conference (July 1915) =

Anglo-French war strategy meeting

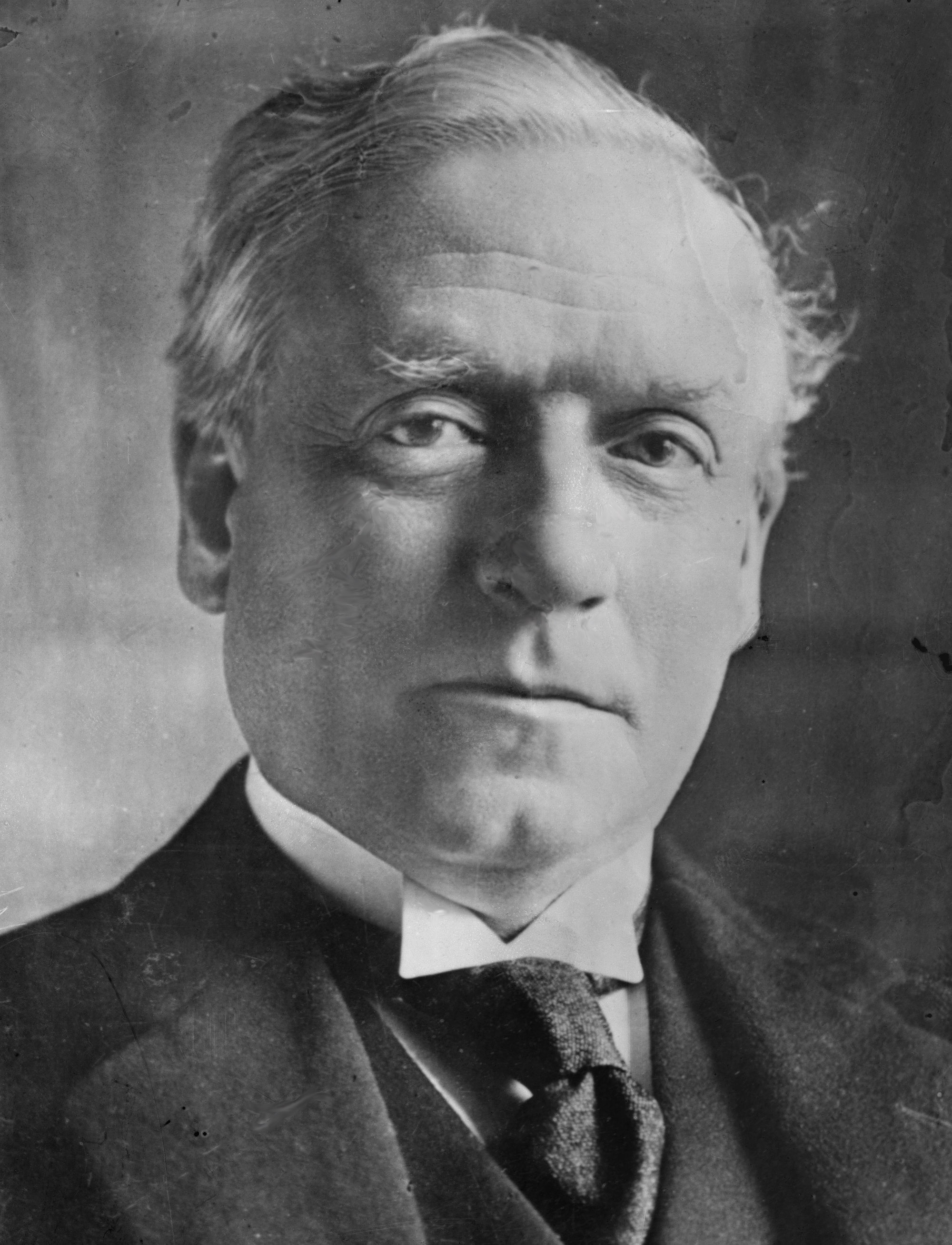
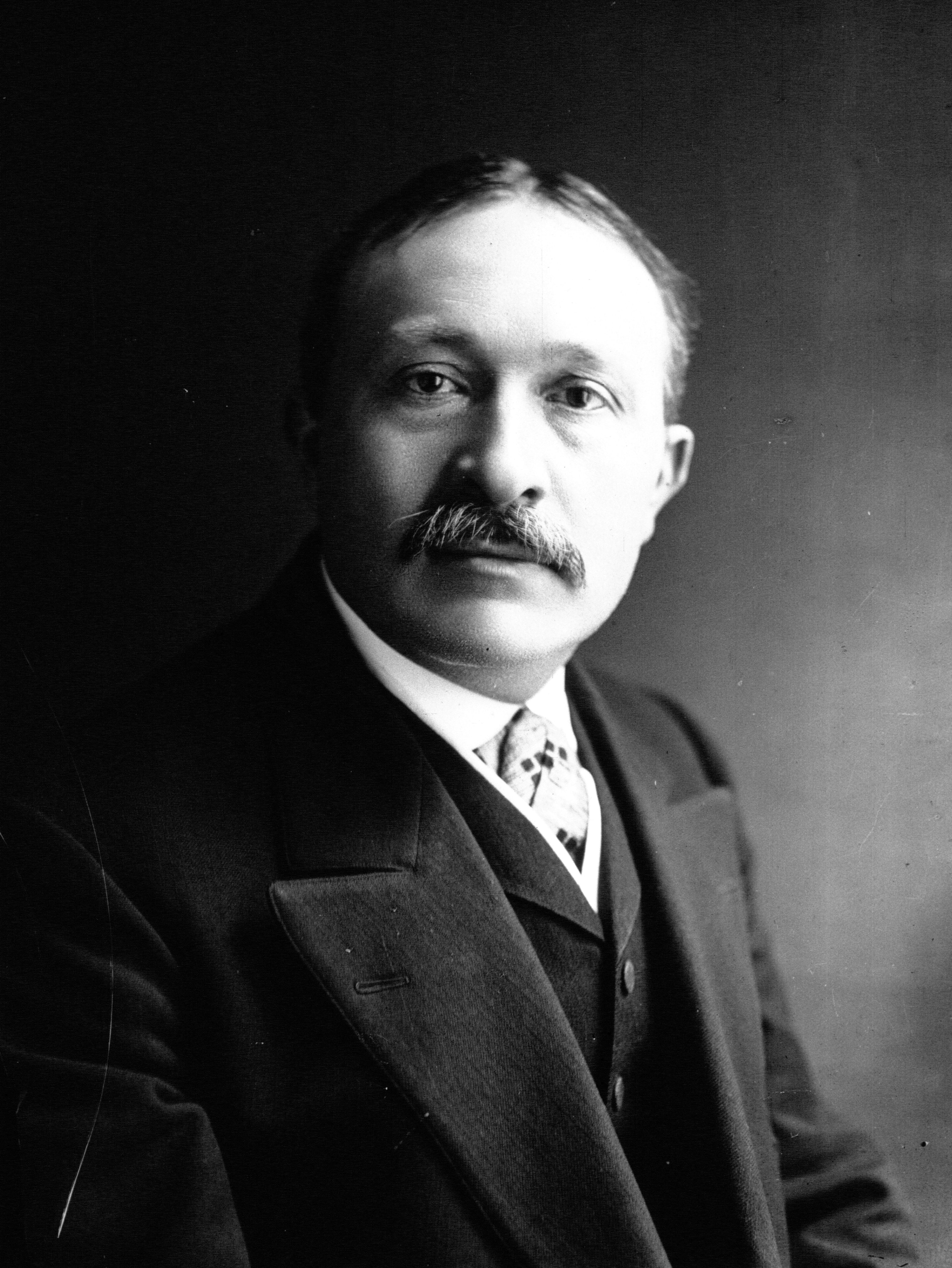
Asquith and Viviani

The Calais Conference took place in the French city of Calais on 6 July 1915. It was intended to improve communication between the British and French governments on strategy for the First World War. It was the first face-to-face meeting between the British and French prime ministers H. H. Asquith and René Viviani. The meeting was poorly organised and no formal record was made of the decisions. The French thought that the British had committed to a major offensive on the Western Front while the British thought they had persuaded the French that the main British effort that year should be in the Gallipoli campaign. A meeting between military leaders at the conference led to a target of 70 divisions being set for the British Expeditionary Force, which would require the imposition of conscription.

== Background ==
The conference was held on 6 July 1915 and was the first face-to-face meeting between the British prime minister H. H. Asquith and his French equivalent René Viviani. The parties had called the conference as both acknowledged that war strategy could not be effectively planned through the slow pre-war diplomatic channels. The conference marked a commitment to more rapid decision making on the course of the war.

== Conference ==
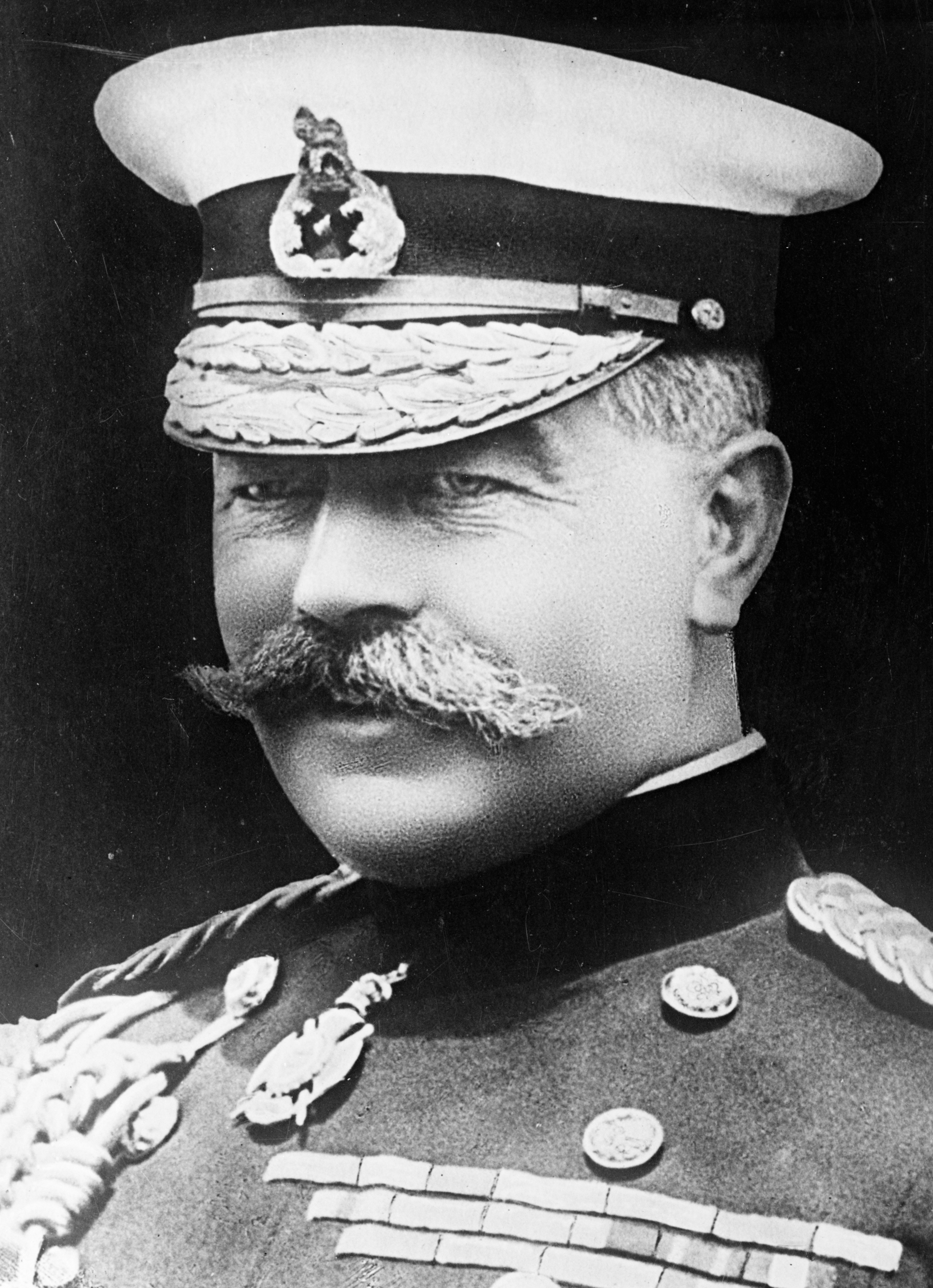
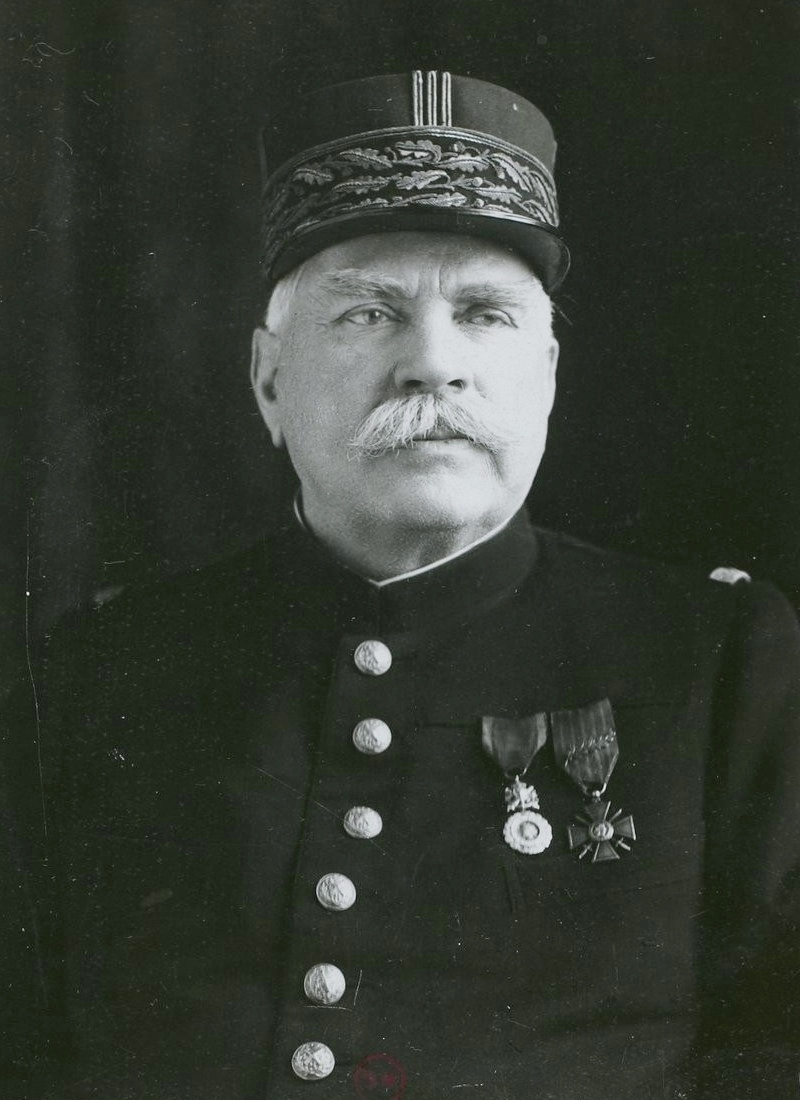
Kitchener and Joffre

On the morning of the conference the British Secretary of State for War Lord Kitchener met with the French commander-in-chief Joseph Joffre in the railway carriage that brought the French delegation to Calais. Kitchener agreed to provide Joffre with a timetable for the deployment of fresh British divisions (the so-called Kitchener's Army) to the Western Front, which Joffre had been requesting for months. The timetable would allow Joffre to plan new offensives, knowing that the line could be reinforced with British troops if losses occurred. The conference opened later that morning. Viviani permitted Asquith to open the event, which he did with a speech made in his halting French; the speech had been hastily translated from English by diplomat George Clerk . Maurice Hankey, the British Secretary of the War Council, described the conference as "chaos" with the proceedings being "stone age" in nature as all discussion was permitted to take place only in French. French general Ferdinand Foch, responsible for liaison between the British and French forces in the field, was not even invited to the conference as the French felt they were more properly represented by Joffre alone.

During proceedings Asquith confirmed the British position was that the Western Front was to be the main focus but that he retained freedom to act elsewhere as the situation arose. The British also attempted to persuade the French to delay the resumption of offensive operations on the Western Front. In the course of proceedings Kitchener agreed to a French proposal that the British Expeditionary Force should reach 70 divisions in strength, a target which proved impossible to meet without the introduction of conscription (which followed in 1916). Owing to poor organisation no secretaries were present to record the outcome of discussions. This led to a misunderstanding in that the French believed the British had committed to a major offensive on the Western Front later that summer whilst the British thought they had persuaded the French that the main British effort that year should be in the Gallipoli campaign.

== Aftermath ==
The day after the conference a purely military conference was held between British and French officers at the Grand Quartier Général in Chantilly. In the aftermath of the conference the British government established the War Resources Committee to determine what size of army could be fielded by conscription in 1916. With French urging the British resumed the offensive on the Western Front from 25 September, in the Battle of Loos. A further Anglo-French conference was held in December 1915 in which the British argued for the evacuation of the Salonika Front.
