= William Barker (diplomat) =

British diplomat (1909–1992)

Sir William Barker KCMG OBE

British Ambassador to Czechoslavakia
- In office 1966–1968
- Preceded by: Sir Cecil Parrott
- Succeeded by: Sir Howard Smith

Personal details
- Born: 19 July 1909
- Died: 8 January 1992 (aged 82)
- Children: 2
- Education: University of Liverpool
- Occupation: Diplomat and academic
- Years active: 1969–1976

Academic work
- Discipline: Russian Studies
- Institutions: University of Liverpool

Sir William Barker (19 July 1909 – 8 January 1992) was a British diplomat and Slavonic scholar.

== Early life and education ==
Barker was born on 19 July 1909 in Leigh, Lancashire, the son of Alfred Barker. He was educated at Leigh Grammar School and the University of Liverpool where he took a first class degree in Russian. Unable to further his Russian studies in the Soviet Union, he went to Prague where he took a doctorate at Charles University.

== Career ==
Barker remained in Prague learning Czech and teaching until the outbreak of World War II, and then joined the Intelligence Corps and forged links with exiled Czech military personnel in Britain. In 1943, he transferred to the Foreign Office in 1943, and after the war, was posted to Prague as first secretary when the Embassy reopened. He acted as chargé d'affaires there, and was confirmed as a member of the Foreign Service in 1946. In 1947, he was transferred to Moscow, and promoted to counsellor in 1950. He then went to Oslo where he remained until 1954.

In 1954, he was appointed consul-general at Boston before he was transferred to Washington in the following year. When Krushchev and Bulganin visited Britain in 1956, Barker was appointed as the head interpreter. In 1960, he returned to Moscow with the rank of minister, and acted as chargé d’affaires there on several occasions. After spending nine months at the Centre for International Affairs at Harvard as Fellow and chair of International Politics, he returned to London in 1963 as assistant under-secretary of state at the Foreign Office working in the research department. In 1966, he was appointed ambassador to Czechoslovakia, a post he held until 1968.

Barker's return to Czechoslovakia as ambassador was opportune and timely, at a crucial point in the country's history. According to The Times, "Britain's envoy in the Czechoslovak capital was a Slavonic specialist and scholar in his own right with unrivalled contacts among the local people". Many leading military figures who Barker knew from his wartime days in Britain who had been permitted to return from exile were now in positions of influence in Prague, and Barker, in the right place at the right time, "occupied centre stage – or came as close as any diplomat can to doing so." When Soviet tanks entered Prague in August 1968, bringing the period of liberalisation known as the Prague Spring to an end, Barker turned the Embassy into a refuge for hundreds of British expatriates, before he and his wife shortly after returned to Britain by car, bringing his diplomatic career to a dramatic end.

In 1970, Barker was accused in a Communist Party newspaper, Rude Pravo, of working for the British secret service, conspiring with his wartime contacts, and helping Dubcek, and that the British press attaché in Prague, "smuggled out various manuscripts attacking Socialism and publishing them."

By the time the newspaper reports were published Barker was back in Britain and had joined the University of Liverpool as a Bowes Professor of Russian where he remained until his retirement in 1976.

== Personal life and death ==
Barker married Margaret Beirne in 1939, and they had one son and one daughter.

Barker died on 8 January 1992, aged 82.

== Honours ==
Companion of the Order of St Michael and St George (CMG) in the 1958 Birthday Honours, and promoted to Knight Commander (KCMG) in the 1967 New Year Honours. He was appointed Officer of the Order of the British Empire (OBE) in the 1949 Birthday Honours.

== See also ==
- Czech Republic–United Kingdom relations

Diplomatic posts
Preceded by Sir Cecil Parrott	British Ambassador to Czechoslavakia; 1966–1968	Succeeded by Sir Howard Smith
