= Quaestor (disambiguation) =

The term Quaestor can refer to any number of officials:

- Quaestor, a magistrate in the Roman Republic responsible for civil and military finances
- Quaestor sacri palatii, head legal official of the late Roman/early Byzantine empires, established by Constantine the Great
- Quaestor exercitus, 6th-century Byzantine military/administrative post established by Emperor Justinian
- Quaestor (University of St Andrews), the Finance Director and Treasurer
- Quaestor (European Parliament), officials elected to look after Members of the European Parliament
- Questore, a rank of the Italian Police force
- Chestor, the Romanian National Police rank equivalent to the rank of Police Commissioner
