= David Broucher =

British diplomat

His Excellency David Broucher

British Ambassador to the Czech Republic
- In office 1997–2001
- Preceded by: Michael Burton
- Succeeded by: Anne Pringle

Personal details
- Born: 5 October 1944 (age 81)

David Stuart Broucher (born 5 October 1944) is a former British diplomat. He served as British Ambassador to the Czech Republic between 1997 and 2001 and as permanent representative to the Conference on Disarmament from 2001 to 2004.

He was educated at Manchester Grammar School and Trinity Hall, Cambridge.

== Hutton Inquiry ==
At the Hutton Inquiry Broucher reported a conversation with David Kelly at a Geneva meeting in February 2003, which he described as from "deep within the memory hole". Broucher said that Kelly said he had assured his Iraqi sources that there would be no war if they co-operated, and that a war would put him in an 'ambiguous' moral position. Broucher had asked Kelly what would happen if Iraq were invaded, and Kelly had replied, 'I will probably be found dead in the woods'.

== Sources ==
- (in Romanian) Ziarul Financiar, 31 mai 2005 - Președintele și-a luat consilieri străini
- (in Romanian) Ziua, 31 mai 2005 - Consilieri britanici la Cotroceni
- (in Romanian) Cotidianul, 17 noiembrie 2006 - Băsescu mai are doar 2 consilieri personali din 4
