= David Brighty =

British diplomat (1939–2025)

Anthony David Brighty CMG CVO (7 February 1939 – 28 October 2025) was a British diplomat who was ambassador to several countries.

== Life and career ==
Anthony David Brighty was educated at Northgate Grammar School (now Northgate High School (Ipswich)) and Clare College, Cambridge. He joined the Foreign Office in 1961, served in Brussels and Havana, then in 1969 resigned and spent two years working for S. G. Warburg & Co. He rejoined the Foreign Office in 1971 and served at Saigon and at the UK mission to the United Nations in New York City, then attended the Royal College of Defence Studies in 1979. He was head of the Personnel Operations Department at the Foreign and Commonwealth Office 1980–83, Counsellor at Lisbon 1983–86, and Director of the Cabinet of the Secretary General of NATO (Lord Carrington) 1986–87. He was ambassador to Cuba 1989–91 and to Czechoslovakia 1991–93, then after the dissolution of Czechoslovakia he was ambassador both to the Czech Republic and (non-resident) to Slovakia 1993–94. He was ambassador to Spain and (non-resident) to Andorra 1994–98.

After retiring from the Diplomatic Service, Brighty was a non-executive director of EFG Private Bank and of Henderson EuroMicro Investment Trust. In 2003 he was Robin Humphreys Fellow at the Institute of Latin American Studies, University of London. He was chairman of the Cañada Blanch Centre for Contemporary Spanish Studies at the London School of Economics.

Brighty died on 28 October 2025, at the age of 86.

== Publications ==
- Cuba Under Castro: Ambassadorial Reflections, Institute of Latin American Studies, 2004

Diplomatic posts
Preceded by Andrew Palmer	Ambassador to Cuba; 1989–1991	Succeeded by Leycester Coltman
Preceded by Laurence O'Keeffe	Ambassador to Czechoslovakia; 1991–1993	Succeeded by himself, as ambassador to Czech Republic and Slovakia
Preceded by himself, as ambassador to Czechoslovakia	Ambassador to the Czech Republic; 1993–1994	Succeeded by Sir Michael Burton
Preceded by himself, as ambassador to Czechoslovakia	Non-resident Ambassador to Slovakia; 1993–1994	Succeeded by Michael Bates
Preceded by Sir Robin Fearn	Ambassador to Spain and non-resident Ambassador to Andorra; 1994–1998	Succeeded by Peter Torry
