= Tony Brenton =

British diplomat (born 1950)

Sir Tony Brenton KCMG
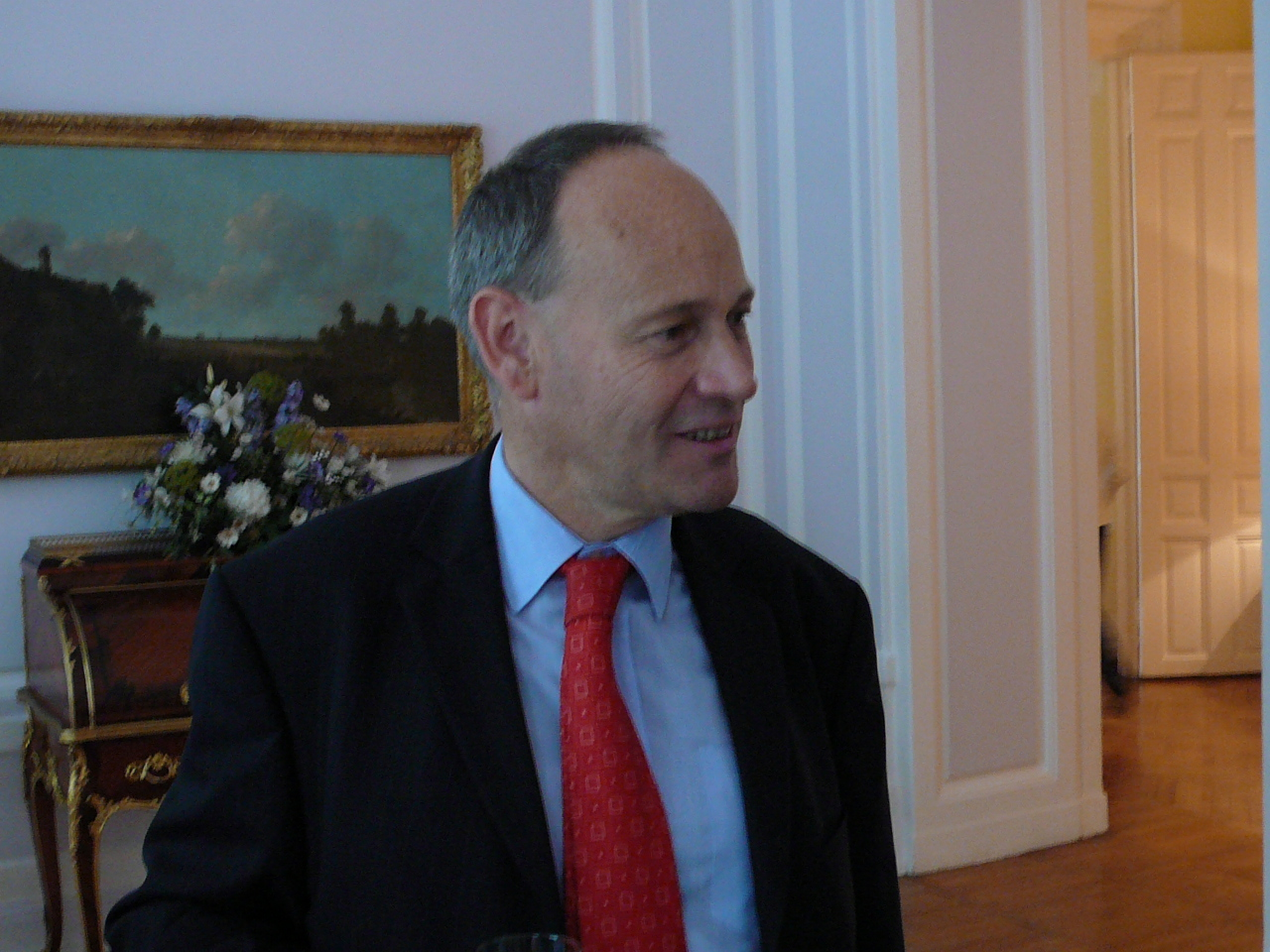

British Ambassador to Russia
- In office 2004–2008
- Prime Minister: Tony Blair; Gordon Brown
- Preceded by: Roderic Lyne
- Succeeded by: Anne Pringle

Personal details
- Born: 1 January 1950 (age 76)
- Education: Queens' College, Cambridge

Sir Anthony Russell Brenton, KCMG (born 1 January 1950) is a former British diplomat.

== Education ==
Brenton was educated at Peter Symonds' School, a former direct grant grammar school for boys (which subsequently became Peter Symonds College) in Winchester, Hampshire, followed by Queens' College, Cambridge, where he studied Mathematics.

== Life and career ==
Brenton entered the British Foreign and Commonwealth Office in 1975, where he began his career learning Arabic and spent three years in the British Embassy in Cairo working on Middle East disputes. He later worked in London and Brussels on the development of European Community Foreign and Energy Policy and, also in Brussels, he worked on European Environment Policy for the European Commission, dealing with energy issues, the Chernobyl crisis and the birth of European environment policy.

Brenton took a sabbatical at Harvard University to write The Greening of Machiavelli – The History of International Environmental Politics after setting up and leading (1990–92) the Foreign Office unit that negotiated for the 1992 Rio "Earth Summit", and in particular the first global agreement on climate change. In 1989–90, he headed a UN Department in the Foreign Office in London. From 1994–98 he worked as a Counsellor in the British Embassy in Moscow, responsible for the British aid programme to Russia, analysis of the Russian economy, and UK policy towards Russia in the major international economic fields. In 1998 he was nominated to the position of Director on Global Issues in the FCO. Within the sphere of his responsibilities was the policy towards the UN, human rights, the environment and international economy and development.

Brenton served as British Ambassador to Russia from 2004 to 2008. In 2007, he was made a Knight Commander of the Order of St Michael and St George (KCMG). From 2008 to 2017, he was a fellow of Wolfson College, Cambridge. He was director at the Russo-British Chamber of Commerce.

== Selected works ==
- Tony Brenton (1994) The Greening of Machiavelli: The Evolution of International Environmental Politics
- Tony Brenton (2016) Historically Inevitable? Turning Points of the Russian Revolution
- Tony Brenton (2017) Was Revolution Inevitable?: Turning Points of the Russian Revolution
