= Linda Duffield =

British former diplomat

Linda Joy Duffield CMG (born 18 April 1953) is a British former diplomat who was chief executive of the Westminster Foundation for Democracy 2009–14.

== Career ==
Duffield was educated at St. Mary's Grammar School for Girls in Northwood Hills, now merged into Haydon School, and Exeter University where she graduated in 1975. She worked in the DHSS 1976–85, then studied at the École nationale d'administration in Paris 1985–86 and joined the Foreign and Commonwealth Office (FCO) in 1987. She was posted to Moscow 1989–92, and was deputy High Commissioner at Ottawa 1995–99. She was High Commissioner to Sri Lanka, and concurrently High Commissioner to the Maldives, 1999–2002. She returned to the FCO as director of the Wider Europe department 2002–04, then served as ambassador to the Czech Republic 2004–09. She was appointed chief executive of the Westminster Foundation for Democracy (a body sponsored by the FCO) 2009–14.

Duffield was appointed CMG in the 2002 New Year Honours.

Diplomatic posts
Preceded by David Tatham	British High Commissioner to Sri Lanka and to the Maldives; 1999–2002	Succeeded by Stephen Evans
Preceded by Anne Pringle	British ambassador to the Czech Republic; 2004–2009	Succeeded by Sian MacLeod
