= Nigel Baker =

British diplomat (born 1966)

His Excellency Nigel Baker OBE MVO
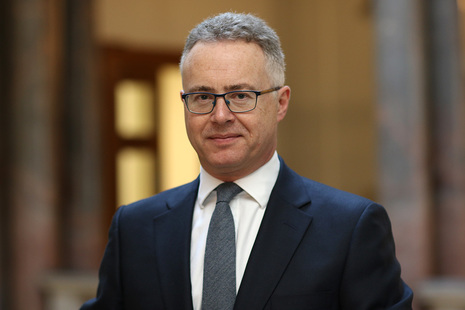
- Baker in 2011

British Ambassador to Slovakia
- In office August 2020 – September 2025
- Monarchs: Elizabeth II; Charles III
- Prime Minister: Boris Johnson; Liz Truss; Rishi Sunak; Keir Starmer
- Preceded by: Andrew Garth
- Succeeded by: Bilal Zahid

British Ambassador to the Holy See
- In office 2011–2016
- Monarch: Elizabeth II
- Prime Minister: David Cameron
- Preceded by: Francis Campbell
- Succeeded by: Sally Axworthy

British Ambassador to Bolivia
- In office 2007–2011
- Monarch: Elizabeth II
- Prime Minister: Gordon Brown; David Cameron
- Preceded by: Peter Bateman
- Succeeded by: Ross Denny

Personal details
- Born: 9 September 1966 (age 59) Birmingham, England
- Spouse: Alexandra (Saša) Baker
- Children: Benjamin James Baker
- Education: Gonville and Caius College, Cambridge
- Occupation: Diplomat

Nigel Marcus Baker OBE MVO (born 9 September 1966) is a British diplomat, who was formerly Ambassador to Bolivia and Ambassador to the Holy See. He was Head of the Latin America department at the Foreign and Commonwealth Office from 2016 to 2019, and August 2020 to September 2025 was British Ambassador to Slovakia.

== Early life and education ==
Baker was born on 9 September 1966. He educated at Dulwich College, an all-boys private boarding school in London. He studied history at Gonville and Caius College, Cambridge, graduating with a first class honours Bachelor of Arts (BA) degree in 1988: as per tradition, his BA was promoted to a Master of Arts (MA Cantab) in 1992.

== Career ==
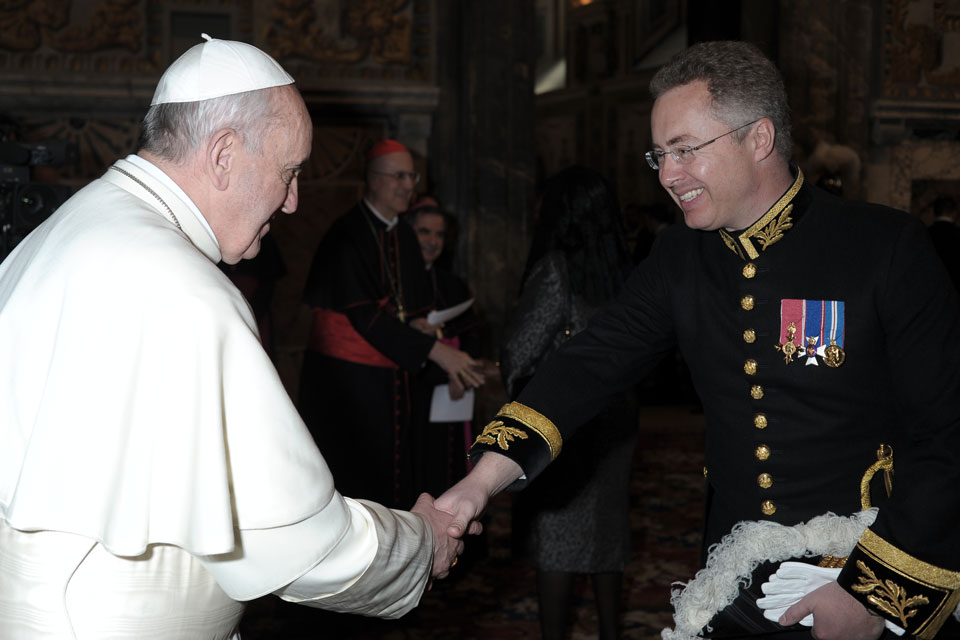
Baker with Pope Francis

After a brief period as researcher in the Conservative Research Department he joined the Foreign and Commonwealth Office (FCO) in 1989. After early overseas postings in Prague and Bratislava he took a research sabbatical in Verona (from 1996–97) studying Italian and European history.

Returning to the FCO, he was Head of the European Defence Section in the Security Policy Department between 1998–2000. He was then assistant Private Secretary to the Prince of Wales 2000–03, Deputy Head of Mission, Havana, 2003–06 and Ambassador to Bolivia 2007–11 before being appointed to the Holy See. He presented his credentials to Pope Benedict XVI on 9 September 2011. In 2016, he returned to the FCO as Deputy Director for the Americas and Head of the South America Department. He became Deputy Director and Head of the Latin America Department in 2018.

Baker was appointed MVO in 2003 for services to the Prince of Wales, and OBE in 2010.

In 2013, he edited Britain and the Holy See: A Celebration of 1982 and the Wider Relationship, which set out the proceedings of the 2012 Rome Colloquium on the relationship between Britain and the Holy See. Contributors include Professor Eamon Duffy, Professor Judith Champ, Cardinal Vincent Nichols, Cardinal Keith Patrick O'Brien, and Cardinal Cormac Murphy-O'Connor.

In August 2020, he became Ambassador to Slovakia, succeeding Andrew Garth. He completed his mission to Slovakia in September 2025. In November 2025 he took up the role of Charge d'Affaires a.i. to Slovenia.

== Notes ==
Diplomatic posts
Preceded by Peter Bateman	British Ambassador to Bolivia; 2007–2011	Succeeded by Ross Denny
Preceded by Francis Campbell	British Ambassador to the Holy See; 2011–2016	Succeeded by Sally Axworthy
Preceded by Andrew Garth	British Ambassador to Slovakia; 2020-2025	Succeeded by Bilal Zahid
