= List of ambassadors of the United Kingdom to the Czech Republic =

Ambassador of the United Kingdom to the Czech Republic Britský velvyslanec v České republice
- Coat of arms of the United Kingdom

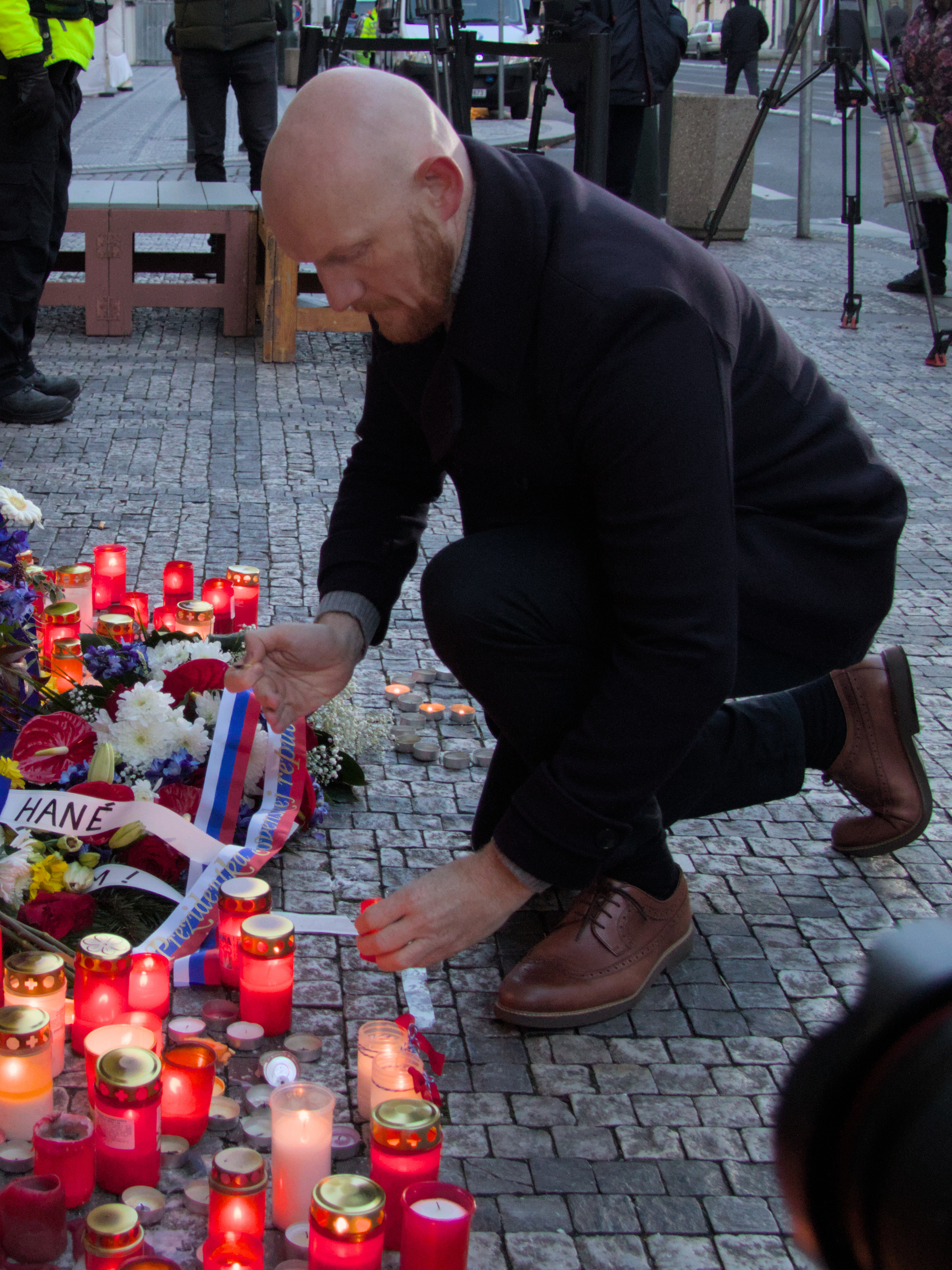
- Incumbent; Matt Field since 2023
- Style: His Excellency
- Residence: Prague
- Appointer: Charles III
- Inaugural holder: Sir George Clerk
- Formation: 1919
- Website: British Embassy Prague

The ambassador of the United Kingdom to the Czech Republic is the United Kingdom's foremost diplomatic representative in the Czech Republic, and head of the UK's diplomatic mission there. The official title is His Britannic Majesty's Ambassador to the Czech Republic.

This list includes British ambassadors to Czechoslovakia, which divided into the Czech Republic and Slovakia in 1993.

== Heads of mission ==
=== Ambassadors to Czechoslovakia ===
| Name | Tenure begin | Tenure end | British monarch | Czechoslovak president |
|---|---|---|---|---|
| Sir George Clerk | 1919 | 1926 | George V | Tomáš Garrigue Masaryk |
| Sir James Macleay | 1926 | 1930 | George V | Tomáš Garrigue Masaryk |
| Sir Joseph Addison | 1930 | 1936 | George V | Tomáš Garrigue Masaryk |
| Sir Charles Bentinck | 1936 | 1937 | George VI | Edvard Beneš |
| Sir Basil Newton | 1937 | 1939 | George VI | Edvard Beneš |
| Sir Robert Bruce Lockhart | 21 July 1940 | 1941 | George VI | Edvard Beneš |
| Frank Roberts (Chargé d'affaires) | 18 July 1941 | 1941 | George VI | Edvard Beneš |
| Sir Philip Nichols | 27 October 1941 | 1947 | George VI | Edvard Beneš |
| Sir Pierson Dixon | 1948 | 1950 | George VI | Klement Gottwald |
| Sir Philip Broadmead | 1950 | 1953 | George VI | Klement Gottwald |
| Sir Derwent Kermode | 1953 | 1955 | Elizabeth II | Antonín Zápotocký |
| Sir Clinton Pelham | 5 May 1955 | 1957 | Elizabeth II | Antonín Zápotocký |
| Sir Paul Grey | 28 June 1957 | 1960 | Elizabeth II | Antonín Novotný |
| Sir Cecil Parrott | 1960 | 1966 | Elizabeth II | Antonín Novotný |
| Sir William Barker | 1966 | 1968 | Elizabeth II | Antonín Novotný |
| Sir Howard Smith | 1968 | 1971 | Elizabeth II | Ludvík Svoboda |
| Ronald Scrivener | 1971 | 1974 | Elizabeth II | Ludvík Svoboda |
| Edward Willan | 1974 | 1977 | Elizabeth II | Ludvík Svoboda→ Gustáv Husák |
| Peter Male | 1977 | 1980 | Elizabeth II | Gustáv Husák |
| John Rich | 1980 | 1985 | Elizabeth II | Gustáv Husák |
| Sir Stephen Barrett | 1985 | 1988 | Elizabeth II | Gustáv Husák |
| Laurence O'Keeffe | 1988 | 1991 | Elizabeth II | Gustáv Husák→ Václav Havel |
| David Brighty | 1991 | 1993 | Elizabeth II | Václav Havel |

=== Ambassadors to the Czech Republic ===
| Name | Tenure begin | Tenure end | British monarch | Czech president |
|---|---|---|---|---|
| David Brighty^{[a]} | 1993 | 1994 | Elizabeth II | Václav Havel |
| Sir Michael Burton | 1994 | 1997 | Elizabeth II | Václav Havel |
| David Broucher | 1997 | 2001 | Elizabeth II | Václav Havel |
| Anne Pringle | 2001 | 2004 | Elizabeth II | Václav Havel→; Václav Klaus |
| Linda Duffield | 2004 | 2009 | Elizabeth II | Václav Klaus |
| Sian MacLeod | 2009 | 2013 | Elizabeth II | Václav Klaus |
| Jan Thompson | 2013 | 2018 | Elizabeth II | Miloš Zeman |
| Nick Archer | 2018 | 2022 | Elizabeth II→; Charles III | Miloš Zeman |
| Matt Field | 2023 | | Charles III | Miloš Zeman→; Petr Pavel |

== See also ==
- Czech Republic–United Kingdom relations

== Notes ==
a. David Brighty continued as both ambassador to the Czech Republic, and as non-resident ambassador to Slovakia after the 1993 Dissolution of Czechoslovakia, until 1994, when he left the post and was replaced by Sir Michael Burton as ambassador to the Czech Republic and by Michael Bates as ambassador to Slovakia.
