= Francis Campbell =

British diplomat and academic

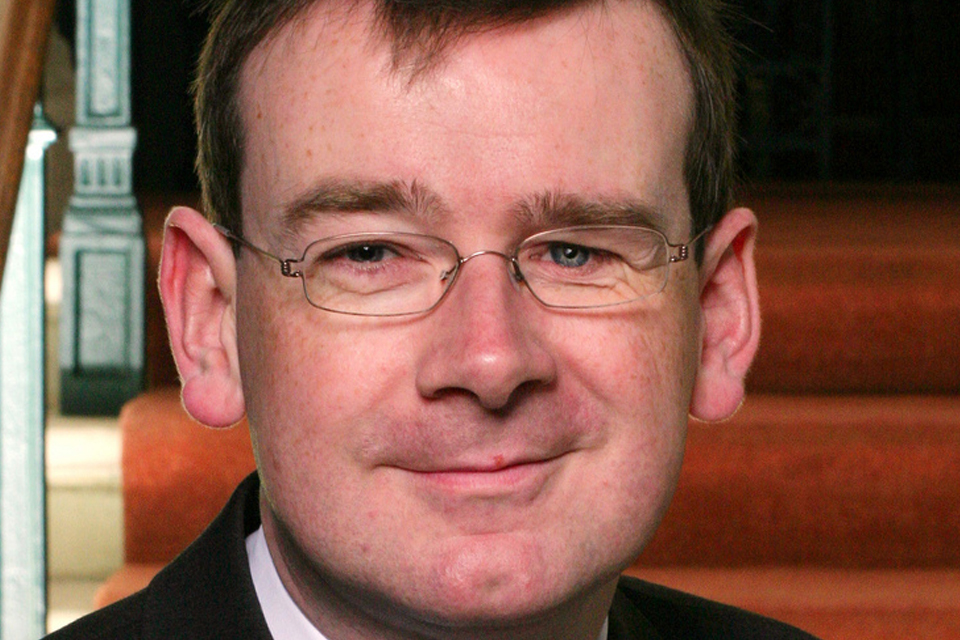

Vice Chancellor of the University of Notre Dame Australia
- Incumbent
- Assumed office 2020
- Chancellor: Chris Ellison
- Preceded by: Celia Hammond

Vice Chancellor of St Mary's University, Twickenham
- In office 2014–2020
- Chancellor: Vincent Nichols
- Preceded by: Arthur Naylor
- Succeeded by: Anthony McClaran

Deputy High Commissioner to Pakistan
- In office 2011–2013
- Prime Minister: David Cameron
- Succeeded by: Philip Barton

British Ambassador to the Holy See
- In office December 2005 – January 2011
- Prime Minister: Gordon Brown; David Cameron
- Preceded by: Kathryn Colvin, CVO
- Succeeded by: Nigel Baker

Personal details
- Born: Francis Martin-Xavier Campbell; 20 April 1970 (age 56) Newry, County Down, Northern Ireland
- Education: Queen's University Belfast KU Leuven

Francis Martin-Xavier Campbell (born 20 April 1970) is a British diplomat and academic. Since January 2020, he has been the Vice-Chancellor of the University of Notre Dame Australia. From 2014 to 2020, he was the Vice-Chancellor of St Mary's University, Twickenham. From 2005 to 2011, he was the British Ambassador to the Holy See. He is an Honorary Fellow of St Edmund's College, Cambridge.

== Early life ==
Campbell was born on a farm at Rathfriland, near Newry, County Down, Northern Ireland, and was the youngest of four boys. Campbell was educated at St Colman's College, Newry. After St Colman's he attended St Joseph's Seminary in Belfast, part of the philosophy faculty at Queen's University Belfast and attended postgraduate studies at the KU Leuven, where he considered the priesthood. He attended the University of Pennsylvania on a Thouron Award Fellowship.

He was a lector at Westminster Cathedral, and, at one time, was an Extraordinary Minister of Holy Communion. In 2010, The Tablet named him as one of Britain's most influential Roman Catholics.

== Diplomatic career ==
Campbell joined the British Diplomatic Service in 1997, aged 27. His early career focused on Europe with postings to the European Enlargement Unit of the Foreign and Commonwealth Office and secondment to the European Commission, as part of its Delegation to the United Nations in New York.

From 1999 to 2003 he worked at 10 Downing Street, appointed first as Policy Adviser to Tony Blair, the then Prime Minister (1999–2001) and then Private Secretary to the same Prime Minister (2001–2003). From 2003 to 2005, he was First Secretary at the British Embassy in Rome and, subsequently, on sabbatical, Senior Policy Director with Amnesty International in London. He was Ambassador to the Holy See from 2005 to 2011, appointed under the government of Tony Blair, and was then appointed Deputy High Commissioner to Pakistan, based in Karachi. In 2013 Campbell was appointed Head of the Policy unit for the FCO and also Head of Innovation for UKTI. In 2014 he became Vice-Chancellor of St Mary's University, Twickenham, London.

In August 2014 in light of attacks in Iraq, Campbell, criticised the Government for its failure to speak out over what he described as ethnic cleansing. "A culture and civilisation is being destroyed and our political leaders are silent," he said, asking Prime Minister David Cameron via the social networking site Twitter: "Why is the UK silent on the ethnic cleansing of Christians from Mosul?" A Foreign Office spokesman told The Tablet: "The threat to Christians in the Mosul area is a particular tragedy, given that it has one of the oldest Christian communities in the world. We will work with the new Baghdad Government to raise these matters further."

== Documentary ==
Airing in February and March 2010, a 3-part documentary by BBC Northern Ireland called Our Man In The Vatican, focused on a year in the life of Ambassador Campbell. Contributors to the programme included Tony Blair, the Prime Minister during Campbell's role as Private Secretary.

== Personal life ==
Campbell has stated that he is both "British and Irish" and that he is not "going to exaggerate one identity at the expense of the other."

== See also ==
- British Ambassadors to the Holy See

Diplomatic posts
Preceded by John Sawers	Private Secretary for Foreign Affairs to the Prime Minister; 2001–2003	Succeeded by Matthew Rycroft
Preceded by Kathryn Colvin	Ambassador of the United Kingdom to the Holy See; 2005–2011	Succeeded by Nigel Baker
