= Stephen Barrett (diplomat) =

British retired diplomat

Sir Stephen Jeremy Barrett KCMG (born 4 December 1931) is a British retired diplomat who was ambassador to Czechoslovakia and Poland.

== Career ==
Barrett was educated at Westminster School and Christ Church, Oxford. He joined the Foreign Office (later the Foreign and Commonwealth Office, FCO) in 1955 and served in Cyprus, Berlin, Helsinki, Prague and Ankara. He was briefly Principal Private Secretary to the Foreign Secretary in 1975. He was head of the British Interests Section at the Swedish Embassy in Tehran in 1981, Assistant Under-Secretary at the FCO 1981–84, Ambassador to Czechoslovakia 1985–88 and Ambassador to Poland 1988–91.

Barrett was appointed CMG in the New Year Honours of 1982 and knighted KCMG in the Queen's Birthday Honours of 1991.

== Publications ==
- Poland in transition : the return of the native, M.B. Grabowski memorial lecture, School of Slavonic and East European Studies, London, 2001 (SSEES occasional papers, no. 54)

Diplomatic posts
Preceded by Antony Acland	Principal Private Secretary to the Secretary of State for Foreign Affairs; 1975	Succeeded by Ewen Fergusson
Preceded by John Rich	Ambassador to Czechoslovakia; 1985–1988	Succeeded by Laurence O'Keeffe
Preceded by Sir Brian Barder	Ambassador to Poland; 1988–1991	Succeeded by Michael Llewellyn-Smith
