= Laurence O'Keeffe =

British diplomat (1931/1932–2003)

Peter Laurence O'Keeffe CMG CVO (1931/1932 – 2 May 2003) was a British diplomat who was ambassador to Czechoslovakia during the Velvet Revolution.

== Career ==
O'Keeffe was educated at St Francis Xavier's College (Liverpool) and University College, Oxford. He joined the Civil Service in 1953, initially in HM Customs and Excise, but transferred to the Foreign Service in 1962 and was posted to Bangkok 1962–65; the South East Asia desk at the Foreign Office 1965–68; Head of Chancery at Athens 1968–72; Commercial Counsellor at Jakarta 1972–75; and head of the Hong Kong and Indian Ocean Department, FCO, 1975–76.

He was then posted to New York City as director of the then British Information Services, which was "an extension of the press and public affairs section of the British Embassy in Washington, located in New York because of the city's pre-eminence as a media centre. Its role [was] to explain developments in British Government policies and society to people and organisations throughout the United States." O'Keefe fought to save the BIS from changes proposed by the ambassador Peter Jay but left New York in 1978; The Times reported that the dispute with Mr Jay had cost him his post although the Foreign Office claimed that his departure was routine.

O'Keefe was then posted as Counsellor to the embassy at Nicosia 1978–81. After a year as Research Associate at the Institute for the Study of Diplomacy, Georgetown University, he was appointed Ambassador to Senegal in July 1982, just after the end of the Falklands War, when Dakar airport was a vital staging point for the RAF on their way south to the Falkland Islands. While in Senegal O'Keefe was also concurrently (non-resident) ambassador to Guinea, Guinea-Bissau, Mali, Mauritania and Cape Verde. He returned to London in 1985 for a brief spell as chairman of the Civil Service Selection Board, before going to Vienna as head of the UK delegation to the Conference on Security and Co-operation in Europe 1986–88.

In 1988 O'Keefe was appointed to his final diplomatic post as ambassador to Czechoslovakia. "O'Keeffe arrived in a country on the brink of change. He was fortunate to have been introduced to most of the leading dissidents, so by the time of the Velvet Revolution he knew personally all the main actors in Prague and Bratislava. ... In the wave of Anglophilia that swept over post-revolutionary Czechoslovakia his official car was greeted by cheering crowds who saw him as a symbol of liberty." He retired in 1991.

Laurence O'Keefe was appointed CVO in 1974 and CMG in the Queen's Birthday Honours of 1983. Under the name of Laurence Halley he wrote two novels and a study of the influence of ethnic groups on foreign policy.

Diplomatic posts
Preceded by William Squire	British Ambassador to Senegal; 1982–1985	Succeeded by John Macrae
Preceded by William Wilberforce	Head of the UK Delegation to the OSCE; 1986–1988	Succeeded by Michael Edes
Preceded by Stephen Barrett	British Ambassador to Czechoslovakia; 1988–1991	Succeeded by David Brighty

== Publications ==
(as Laurence Halley)

- Simultaneous Equations, Jonathan Cape, London, 1975. ISBN 022401160X
- Ancient Affections: Ethnic Groups and Foreign Policy, Praeger, New York, 1985. ISBN 0030025745
- Abiding City, Bodley Head, London, 1986. ISBN 0370307305
