= Sponsio Academica =

The Sponsio Academica is the oath taken by all students matriculating into the four ancient Scottish universities. Traditionally the oath was given orally in Latin but it is now appended to the matriculation form signed by each student. Each student who takes the oath promises that they have put themselves under the authority of the Senatus Academicus of their particular institution.

At the University of St Andrews the following oath is taken.

Nos ingenui adolescentes, nomina subscribentes, sancte pollicemur nos preceptoribus obsequium debitum exhibituros in omnibus rebus ad disciplinam et bonos mores pertinentibus, Senatus Academici authoritati obtemperaturos, et hujus Academiae Andreanae emolumentum et commodum, quantum in nobis sit, procuraturos, ad quemcunque vitae statum pervenerimus. Item agnoscimus si quis nostrum indecore turbulenterve se gesserit vel si parum diligentem in studiis suis se praebuerit neque admonitus se in melius correxerit eum licere Senatui Academico vel poena congruenti adficere vel etiam ex Universitate expellere.	We students who set down our names hereunder in all good faith make a solemn promise that we shall show due deference to our teachers in all matters relating to order and good conduct; that we shall be subject to the authority of the Senatus Academicus and shall, whatever be the position we attain hereafter, promote, so far as lies in our power, the profit and the interest of our University of St Andrews. Further, we recognise that, if any of us conducts themselves in an unbecoming or disorderly manner or shows insufficient diligence in their studies and, though admonished, does not improve, it is within the power of the Senatus Academicus to inflict on such students a fitting penalty or even expel them from the University.

At the University of Glasgow the following oath is taken:

Ego in Universitate Glasguensi discipulus sancte polliceor me Senatui Academico par iturum ita ut quae ab eo secundum leges academiae praescribuntur praestem et animadversioni eius reverenter me subiciam; ipsius academiae dignitatem atque salutem quantum in mefuerit per reliquam vitam procuraturum.	I a student in the University of Glasgow solemnly promise that I will fulfil the requirements made by the Senatus Academicus in accordance with the regulations of the University and will conform to its discipline and that for the rest of my life, so far as in me lies, I will maintain the honour and welfare of the University.

At the University of Edinburgh the following oath is taken:

I acknowledge that in all matters relating to the teaching and discipline of the University I have willingly placed myself under the jurisdiction of the Senatus Academicus, and I recognise that if, in the opinion of the Senatus, my studies or my conduct are unsatisfactory, it has authority to forbid my continuance upon courses qualifying for a degree.
