= Clinton Pelham =

British diplomat (1898–1984)

Sir Clinton Pelham KBE CMG FRGS

British Ambassador to Czechoslovakia
- In office 1955–1957
- Preceded by: Sir Derwent Kermode
- Succeeded by: Sir Paul Grey

British Ambassador to Saudi Arabia
- In office 1951–1955
- Preceded by: Alan Trott
- Succeeded by: Sir Harold Beeley

Personal details
- Born: 20 May 1898
- Died: 17 June 1984 (aged 86)
- Children: 2
- Occupation: Diplomat

Sir George Clinton Pelham (20 May 1898 – 17 June 1984) was a British diplomat who served as ambassador to Saudi Arabia from 1951 to 1955 and ambassador to Czechoslovakia from 1955 to 1957.

== Early life and education ==
Pelham was born on 20 May 1898, the son of George Pelham. He was educated privately.

== Career ==
After serving during World War I from 1915 to 1918, Pelham joined the Foreign Office in 1920 after working briefly at the Customs and Excise Department. In 1923, he transferred to the Far Eastern Consular Service as a student interpreter, and in the following year was appointed vice-consul in China. In 1934, he served as commercial secretary at Peking.

In 1943, Pelham was appointed acting consul-general in Madagascar. He then served at Baghdad as first secretary (commercial) in 1945, promoted to counsellor (commercial) the following year, and counsellor (commercial) at Madrid from 1948 to 1951.

Pelham then served as Ambassador to Saudi Arabia from 1951 to 1955, and Ambassador to Czechoslovakia from 1955 to 1957.

In retirement Pelham became a Fellow of the Royal Geographical Society (FRGS), and was a county councillor for West Sussex from 1963 to 1970.

== Personal life and death ==
Pelham married Jeanie Adelina Morton in 1930 and they had two daughters.

Pelham died on 17 June 1984, aged 86.

== Honours ==
Pelham was appointed Companion of the Order of St Michael and St George (CMG) in the 1949 New Year Honours. He was appointed Knight Commander of the Order of the British Empire (KBE) in the 1957 New Year Honours.

== See also ==
- Czech Republic–United Kingdom relations
- Saudi Arabia–United Kingdom relations

Diplomatic posts
Preceded by Alan Trott	British Ambassador to Saudi Arabia; 1951–1955	Succeeded by Sir Harold Beeley
Preceded by Sir Derwent Kermode	British Ambassador to Czechoslovakia; 1955–1957	Succeeded by Sir Paul Grey
