= Quaestor (University of St Andrews) =

Quaestor and Factor of University of St Andrews
- Incumbent; Derek Watson FFCA since 2003
- Member of: Principal's Office
- Reports to: Principal
- Appointer: University Court
- Website: Quaestor and Factor

The Quaestor at the University of St Andrews, in Scotland, is a senior executive, and is responsible for the finances of the University; the equivalent of treasurer, Finance Director, or chief operating officer in other institutions. The Quaestor is also the Factor of the University.

The Quaestor is a member of the Office of the Principal, and work under the direction of the Principal of the University of St Andrews, who is chief executive of the University.

The Quaestor and Factor, as of 01 August 2024, was Derek Watson FFCA, who had been in office since 2003.

== See also ==
- Governance of the University of St Andrews
