= Paul Grey =

British diplomat (1908–1990)

Sir Paul Grey KCMG

British Ambassador to Switzerland
- In office 1960–1964
- Preceded by: Sir William Montagu-Pollock
- Succeeded by: Sir Robert Isaacson

British Ambassador to Czechoslovakia
- In office 1957–1960
- Preceded by: Sir Clinton Pelham
- Succeeded by: Sir Cecil Parrott

Personal details
- Born: 2 December 1908 Lahore
- Died: 15 December 1990 (aged 82)
- Children: 3
- Education: Christ Church, Oxford
- Occupation: Diplomat and civil servant

Sir Paul Francis Grey (2 December 1908 – 15 December 1990) was a British diplomat who served as ambassador to Czechoslovakia from 1957 to 1960 and ambassador to Switzerland from 1960 to 1964.

== Early life and education ==
Grey was born on 2 December 1908 in Lahore, the son of Lt-Col Arthur Grey who was a barrister there, and Teresa née Alleyne. He was a distant relative of Edward Grey, the Foreign Secretary. He was educated at Charterhouse School and Christ Church, Oxford.

== Career ==
Grey entered the Diplomatic Service in 1933, and his first posting was to Rome as third secretary in 1935. During the War, he worked at the Foreign Office until 1944 when he was sent as first secretary to Rio de Janeiro. In 1945, he served at The Hague as chargé d'affaires reopening the British Embassy there, and from 1947 to 1949 he was head of the South-East Asia Department at the Foreign Office. From 1949 to 1951, he was counsellor at Lisbon and then minister at Moscow from 1951 to 1954 before he returned to the Foreign Office as assistant under-secretary, serving from 1954 to 1957.

Grey then served as ambassador to Czechoslovakia from 1957 to 1960 and ambassador to Switzerland from 1960 to 1964.

After his retirement to England, Grey was engaged in a wide range of charitable work as a member of the Catholic Union and as a Knight of Malta.

== Personal life and death ==
Grey married Agnes Mary Weld-Blundell in 1936 and they had three sons.

Grey died on 15 December 1990, aged 82.

== Honours ==
Grey was appointed Companion of the Order of St Michael and St George (CMG) in the 1951 Birthday Honours, and promoted to Knight Commander (KCMG) in the 1963 New Year Honours.

== See also ==
- Czech Republic–United Kingdom relations
- Switzerland–United Kingdom relations

Diplomatic posts
Preceded by Sir Clinton Pelham	British Ambassador to Czechoslovakia; 1957–1960	Succeeded by Sir Cecil Parrott
Preceded by Sir William Montagu-Pollock	British Ambassador to Switzerland; 1960–1964	Succeeded by Sir Robert Isaacson
