= Cecil Parrott =

British diplomat, translator, writer and scholar (1909–1984)

Sir Cecil Parrott KCMG OBE

United Kingdom Ambassador to Czechoslovakia
- In office 1960–1966
- Preceded by: Sir Paul Grey
- Succeeded by: Sir William Barker

Personal details
- Born: Cecil Cuthbert Parrott; January 29, 1909
- Died: June 23, 1984 (aged 75)
- Occupation: Diplomat, translator
- Known for: Translation of The Good Soldier Švejk
- Children: Jasper Parrott

Academic background
- Education: Peterhouse

Academic work
- Era: 20th century
- Discipline: Russian and Soviet Studies
- Institutions: Lancaster University

Sir Cecil Cuthbert Parrott KCMG OBE (29 January 1909 – 23 June 1984) was a British diplomat, translator, writer and scholar.

== Career ==
After studies at Peterhouse, Cambridge, he became a teacher. He joined the Foreign Office in 1939. His diplomatic career culminated with his posting to Prague, where he was the British Ambassador from 1960 to 1966. On retiring from the Foreign Office, he became, at the University of Lancaster, first Professor of Russian and Soviet Studies from 1966 to 1971 then, from 1971 to 1976, Professor of Central and South-Eastern European Studies and finally Director of the Comenius Centre.

== Translator of the Czech language ==
Sir Cecil Parrott is best known for his translation of Jaroslav Hašek's The Good Soldier Švejk. He also translated some of Hašek's short stories, The Red Commissar and Other Tales. He also wrote a study of Hašek's short stories.

He wrote two autobiographical volumes, The Tightrope and The Serpent and the Nightingale, as well as his biography of Hašek, The Bad Bohemian.

== Descent ==
His son, Jasper Parrott, is a businessman involved in artists' management.
