= George Clerk (diplomat) =

British diplomat

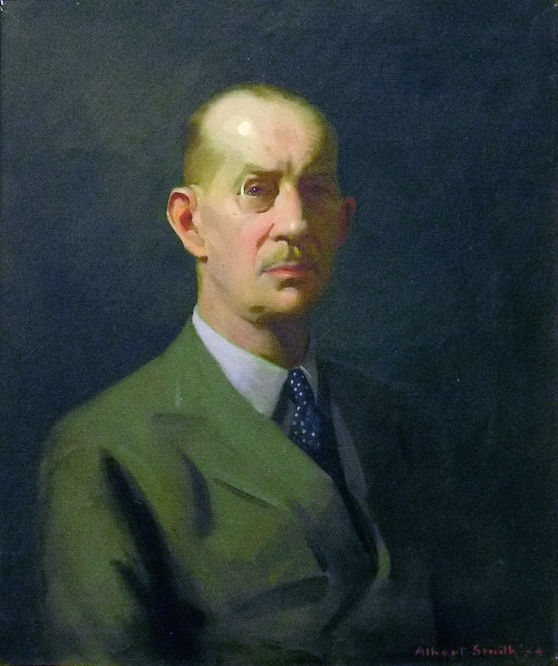
George Russell Clerk (Albert Smith, 1934)

Sir George Russell Clerk GCMG CB PC (29 November 1874 – 18 June 1951) was a British diplomat and Privy Counsellor who ended his career as Ambassador to France from 1934 to 1937, after seven years as Ambassador to Turkey, one as Ambassador to Belgium and seven as Ambassador to The Czechoslovak Republic. His name is pronounced as if spelt Clark.

== Early life ==
The son of General Sir Godfrey Clerk (1835–1908), a Groom in Waiting to Edward VII, Clerk was the grandson and namesake of Sir George Russell Clerk, a civil servant in British India who became Lieutenant-Governor of the North-Western Provinces, Governor of Bombay, and Under-Secretary of State for India.

Clerk was educated at Eton and New College, Oxford. At Eton he was a contemporary of Prince Alexander of Teck, later Governor-General of South Africa and of Canada, Geoffrey Dawson, later editor of The Times, and the author Maurice Baring.

== Career ==
Clerk was appointed a clerk in the Foreign Office in 1899. In early 1901 was appointed an acting Third Secretary to accompany a special diplomatic mission to announce King Edward's accession, to the governments of Denmark, Sweden and Norway, Russia, Germany, and Saxony. He went to Addis Ababa in 1903 as Assistant in HM Agency, where he became Acting Agent and Consul-General from 1903 to 1904 and Chargé d'Affaires at the British Legation in Abyssinia, 1906–07. While in Abyssinia, Clerk worked to curb the excesses of the slave trade in the border regions of Sudan and Uganda and gained the nickname of 'the Buffalo'. In 1907 he was recalled to London as an Assistant Clerk in the Foreign Office, and in 1910 went to Constantinople as First Secretary in HM Embassy to the Ottoman Empire, becoming Senior Clerk in 1913 and Acting Counsellor in 1917, when he was knighted.

In the aftermath of the First World War, Clerk was very sympathetic to the cause of the national minorities of the former Austria-Hungary and to the liberal ideals associated with the journal The New Europe. In 1919 he was appointed as Private Secretary to the Acting Secretary of State for Foreign Affairs, giving him an opportunity to influence the face of the new Europe when they embarked on a mission to Hungary. Later in 1919 he was sent as First Minister to Czechoslovakia, serving also as Consul-General there from 1921 to 1926. As British minister in Prague, Clerk pursued his ambition to support the Czechs and make Prague a centre of British influence. Although his policy ended in failure, Clerk had a greater sympathy for the Czechs and Slovaks than any of his successors.

His first appointment as an Ambassador came in 1926, when he was appointed as head of mission to Turkey, and he remained there until 1933, when he took up a brief posting as ambassador at Brussels and Minister Plenipotentiary to Luxembourg, and finally in April 1934 was appointed as British ambassador at Paris.

There were mixed views on Clerk's appointment to Paris in the troubled days of 1934, following the sudden retirement of his predecessor Lord Tyrrell on the grounds of ill health. Lord Vansittart described him as "one of those coming men who never quite arrive". The Liberal leader Sir Archibald Sinclair called Clerk "a man ripe for a mighty enterprise", while Lord Derby stated that it was not the first time Clerk had been sent to a country with difficult times ahead of it and he had always come through with flying colours. However, Sir Warren Fisher, head of the Civil Service, wrote to Vansittart

"...the more I think of your idea of Sir George Clerk, the less I like it. I would agree at once that no one could possibly be such an ass as he looks; and I am prepared to exercise my imagination to the point of accepting him for a rating of B+. But this is by the standards of his own branch of our Service, for by those of the rest of our Service he would not be more than a B−."

Fisher urged the appointment of Sir Eric Phipps, who in fact later succeeded Clerk in Paris, while after Clerk's appointment the disappointed Phipps noted that "G. C. will doubtless be a great success, but it must take many months of groping, since he has never served a day in Paris!"

At the time of the Italian invasion of Abyssinia of October 1935 to May 1936, Clerk had only limited success in urging Pierre Laval, the French Foreign Minister, away from a policy of benevolent neutrality, and was disappointed by French expressions of sympathy for Italy.

In August 1936, Clerk warned Yvon Delbos of the dangers of French intervention in the Spanish Civil War.

In 1937, Clerk finally retired from the Diplomatic Service.

== Honours ==
- Companion of the Order of St Michael and St George, 1908
- Companion of the Order of the Bath, 1915 New Year Honours
- Knight Commander of the Order of St Michael and St George, 1917 Birthday Honours
- Member of the Privy Council, 1926
- Knight Grand Cross of the Order of St Michael and St George, 1929
- Grand Cross, Order of St Stanislaus, Russia
- Grand Cross, Légion d'honneur
- Grand Cross, Order of the White Lion of Bohemia, Czechoslovakia
- Commander of the Order of Saints Maurice and Lazarus, Italy

== Private life ==
Clerk was a member of the Athenæum, Turf, and Beefsteak clubs. In his retirement, he became an honorary Fellow of New College and Vice-President of the Royal Geographical Society. He was also Chairman of the British Film Institute from March 1938 to April 1939. At the time of his death his address was 5 Egerton Place, London SW3.

A historian of the British mission in Paris has described Clerk as "conventionally good-looking, monocled".

Diplomatic posts
Preceded by Sir Ronald Lindsay	British Ambassador to Turkey; 1926–1933	Succeeded by Sir Percy Loraine
Preceded by Earl Granville	British Ambassador to Belgium; 1933–1934	Succeeded by Sir Esmond Ovey
Preceded by Lord Tyrrell	British Ambassador to France; 1934–1937	Succeeded by Sir Eric Phipps
