= General Council of the University of St Andrews =

The General Council of the University of St Andrews is the corporate body of all graduates and senior academics of the University of St Andrews in Scotland. It was instituted by the Universities (Scotland) Act 1858, but its constitution and organisation have been considerably altered by subsequent statutes.

== Role ==
The business of the council is to take into consideration all questions affecting the well-being and prosperity of the university, and to make representations from time to time on such questions to the University Court, who shall consider the same, and return to the council their deliverance thereon. Members may raise any matter bearing upon the university, by reference to the convener of the business committee of the general council, College Gate, St Andrews.

The council elects two assessors to the University Court. No member of the Senatus Academicus is entitled to vote or take part in the election of any assessor of the general council. (The senate elects its own assessors to the court.)

== Constitution and rules ==
The membership of the general council is governed by ordinance No. 96 of the University of St Andrews and is as follows:-

"The chancellor., all graduates of the University (including honorary graduates) and holders of the Licentiateship in Dental Surgery, members and former members of the University Court, Professors and former Professors of the University, Readers and Lecturers who have been in office for more than one year, former Readers and Lecturers who were members of the Council during their tenure of office as such and who continued in the employment of the University until retirement."

The Chancellor of the University is elected by the General Council and is the President of the Council.

Under the Universities (Scotland) Act 1966, new Ordinances and Resolutions are communicated in draft form to the general council, whose opinion thereon is taken into consideration.

=== Standing orders of the General Council ===
1. Statutory Meetings - The council shall assemble twice each year, such meetings to be held on the last Saturday in January and the last Saturday in June (subject to alteration from time to time by resolution of the council with the approval of the University Court).
2. Special Meetings - Special meetings of the council shall be called through the clerk either at the request of the business committee, made by a majority of all its members, or at the request of not less than fifty members of the council.
3. Quorum - the quorum of the council shall be twenty.
4. Chairman - At meetings of the council, the chancellor, whom failing the Principal, whom failing the Chancellor's Assessor, whom failing a Council Assessor on Court (in order of seniority), who fails the Convener of the business committee, shall preside; in the absence of all of these, a chairman shall be elected by the meeting. No member of the Senatus Academicus shall preside at a meeting of the council during that part of the business devoted to the election of an assessor on the University Court. In every case the chairman has a deliberative and casting vote.
5. Committees - The council shall appoint and determine the duties of a business committee. From time to time the council may appoint other committees to report on any matter remitted to them or to carry out instructions given to them by the council.
6. Notice of Motion - Notice of every motion except procedural motions to be proposed at a meeting of the council shall be given to the Clerk in writing, signed by the member giving it, at least eight days prior to the date of the meeting in question. If the chairman is satisfied that due notice could not reasonably have been given in respect of a specific item of business, this Order may be suspended, for the sole purpose of discussing the business in question, on the vote of two-thirds of the members present at a meeting of the council.

== Business Committee ==
The affairs of the council are conducted by a business committee exercising duties determined by the council in accordance with the council's instructions.

The Constitution and duties of the business committee, as determined by the council, are as follows:-

Constitution

1. The Business Committee shall consist of: (a) Members ex officio (b) Elected Members

2. The following shall be members ex officio: (a) The principal. (b) The Chancellor's Assessor on the University Court. (c) The Assessors of the General Council on the University Court. (d) The Conveners of all other Committees (and standing Sub-Committees) of the general council. (e) Two of the co-opted members of the University Court are alumni.

3. (a) The elected members shall be twelve in number. (b) They shall hold office for four years. (c) An elected member shall be eligible to stand for re-election at the end of one four-year term, but having served two consecutive terms shall be ineligible either to stand for a third or to be co-opted on to the committee during the two years before the next round of elections.

4. (a) The election of members shall be by Single Transferable Vote and shall take place every two years by a process of electronic voting agreed by the general council in 2006 as revised in November 2011 and June 2014. (b) If a vacancy occurs in the membership of the committee, either because a member has demitted office before their term has expired or because an insufficient number of candidates have stood for election, the committee may co-opt a new member to fill the vacancy, unless they are excluded by paragraph 3(c), and subject to their being approved at the next General Council meeting. The combined number of elected and co-opted members shall not exceed twelve. Such a co-opted member shall serve until the next round of elections, when they shall be eligible to stand as a candidate. Should there be an election for Convener or Vice-convener during their period of service, a co-opted member of the business committee shall be eligible to participate as a candidate, proposer or seconder, and they shall have a vote.

Duties

The duties of the business committee are to transact business remitted to the committee by the general council, to frame the programme of business to be submitted to meetings of the council, and to act on behalf of the council, under powers specifically conferred upon the committee, or in circumstances of emergency.
