= Brazil–United Kingdom relations =

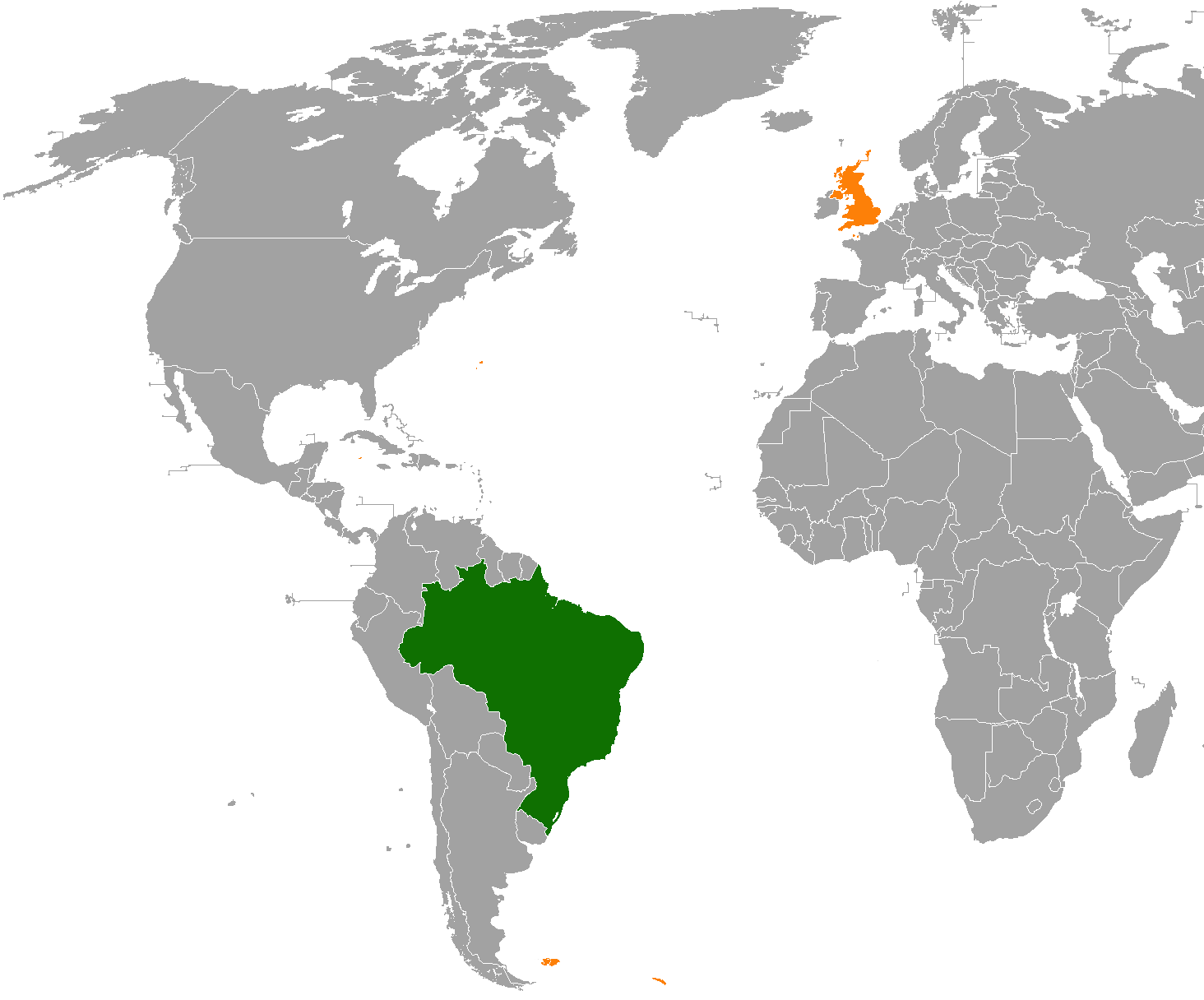

- Brazil: United Kingdom

Diplomatic mission
- Embassy of Brazil, London: Embassy of the United Kingdom, Brasília

Envoy
- Brazilian Ambassador to the United Kingdom Fred Arruda: British Ambassador to Brazil Melanie Hopkins

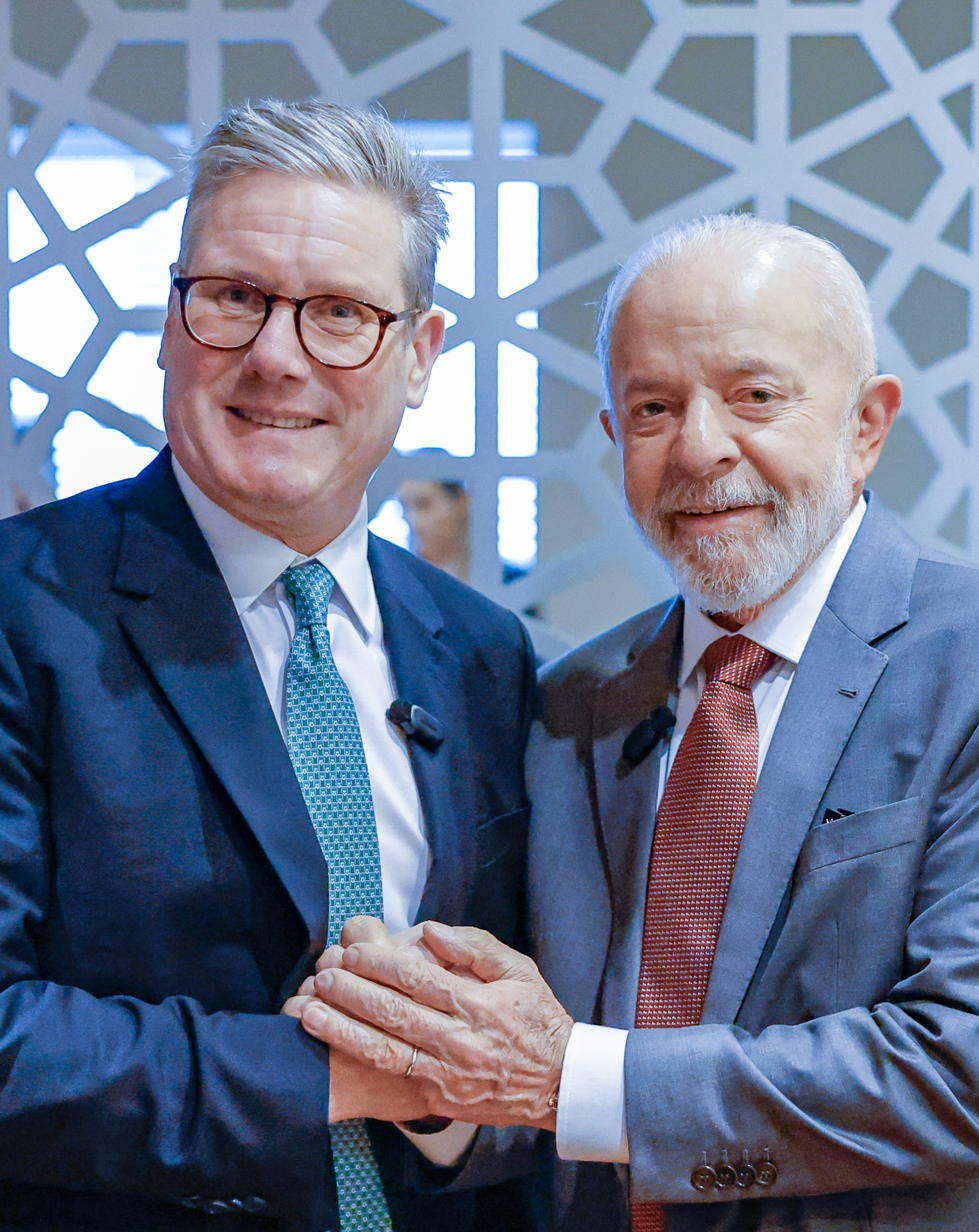
U.K. Prime Minister Keir Starmer (left) and Brazilian President Lula da Silva (right) in September 2024.

Brazil–United Kingdom relations are the diplomatic relations between Brazil and the United Kingdom. Both nations are members of the G20, United Nations and the World Trade Organization.

== Country comparison ==
Common name	Brazil	United Kingdom
Official name	Federative Republic of Brazil	United Kingdom of Great Britain and Northern Ireland
Coat of arms		United Kingdom
Flag	Brazil	United Kingdom
Area	8,515,767 km^{2} (3,287,956 sq mi)	242,495 km^{2} (93,628 sq mi)
Population (est. 2023)	216,408,124	68,795,198
Capital	Brasília	London
Largest metropolitan area	São Paulo – 1,521.11 km2 (7,946.96 km2 metro)	London – 1,485 km2 (13,709,000 km2 metro)
Government	Federal presidential constitutional republic	Unitary parliamentary constitutional monarchy
First leader	Pedro I of Brazil	Robert Walpole
Current leader	Luiz Inácio Lula da Silva	Andy Burnham
Established	7 September 1822 (independence declared); 29 August 1825 (independence recognized); 5 October 1988 (current constitution)	1922
Official languages	Brazilian Portuguese	British English
Currency	Brazilian real	Pound sterling

== History ==
In 1825, the United Kingdom (UK) recognized Brazil's independence from Portugal. In 1826, Brazil and the UK signed a treaty to abolish the slave trade in Brazil, the British-Brazilian Treaty of 1826. However, slave trafficking continued unabated to Brazil, and the British government's passage of the Slave Trade (Brazil) Act 1845 (8 & 9 Vict. c. 122) authorized British warships to board Brazilian shipping and seize any found involved in the slave trade. In 1861, a diplomatic crisis ensued between both nations when a British merchant ship Prince of Wales was wrecked off the coast of Rio Grande do Sul and many of its commodities were seized and crew imprisoned. This was correlated with the Slave Trade (Brazil) Act 1845 as the UK supported the abolition of slavery in Brazil as a means to increase the number of consumers of British products. This diplomatic crisis became known as the Christie Question which led Brazil to break diplomatic relations with the UK. Diplomatic relations were once again restored five years later.

In June 1871, Emperor Pedro II of Brazil paid a six-week visit to the UK. During his stay, the Emperor met with Queen Victoria at both Windsor Castle and at Osborne House on the Isle of Wight. The Emperor would return to the UK for a second time in 1876 during his second European tour. In 1901, both nations signed a border agreement between Brazil and British Guiana. In 1919, both nations elevated their diplomatic legations to embassies.

During World War II, both nations fought side by side during the Italian campaign. In November 1968, Queen Elizabeth II paid her first and only official visit to Brazil. During the Falklands War between the UK and Argentina; Brazil remained strategically neutral during the conflict, however, the Brazilian government maintained that Argentina had rights to the Falkland Islands and banned British aircraft from landing in Brazil.

In 1997, Fernando Henrique Cardoso became the first Brazilian President to pay a visit to the UK. In 2001, Tony Blair became the first British Prime Minister to visit Brazil. There would later be several visits and reunions between leaders of both nations, including visits to Brazil by the British royal family.

During the 7 July 2005 London bombings, British police misidentified a man as a suspect during the bombings and fatally shot Brazilian national Jean Charles de Menezes on 22 July. The incident brought tension in the relationship between both nations.

Since the incident, diplomatic relations between both nations have improved. The UK has seen the growing political and economic importance of Brazil as an opportunity. Furthermore, the UK has explicitly supported Brazil for a permanent membership of the United Nations Security Council, as part of wider UN reform. The UK ranks ninth on the list of countries with the highest flows of direct investments in Brazil, with US$1.17 billion in gross inflows that occurred in 2017.

In September 2021, Brazilian President Jair Bolsonaro claimed that British Prime Minister Boris Johnson had approached him asking for an "emergency food deal" to cover for food products missing in the UK. This claim was disputed by British officials. After the death of Queen Elizabeth II, the president Jair Bolsonaro declared a national mourning for three days duel and residences flew its national flag at half-mast.

== Economic relations ==
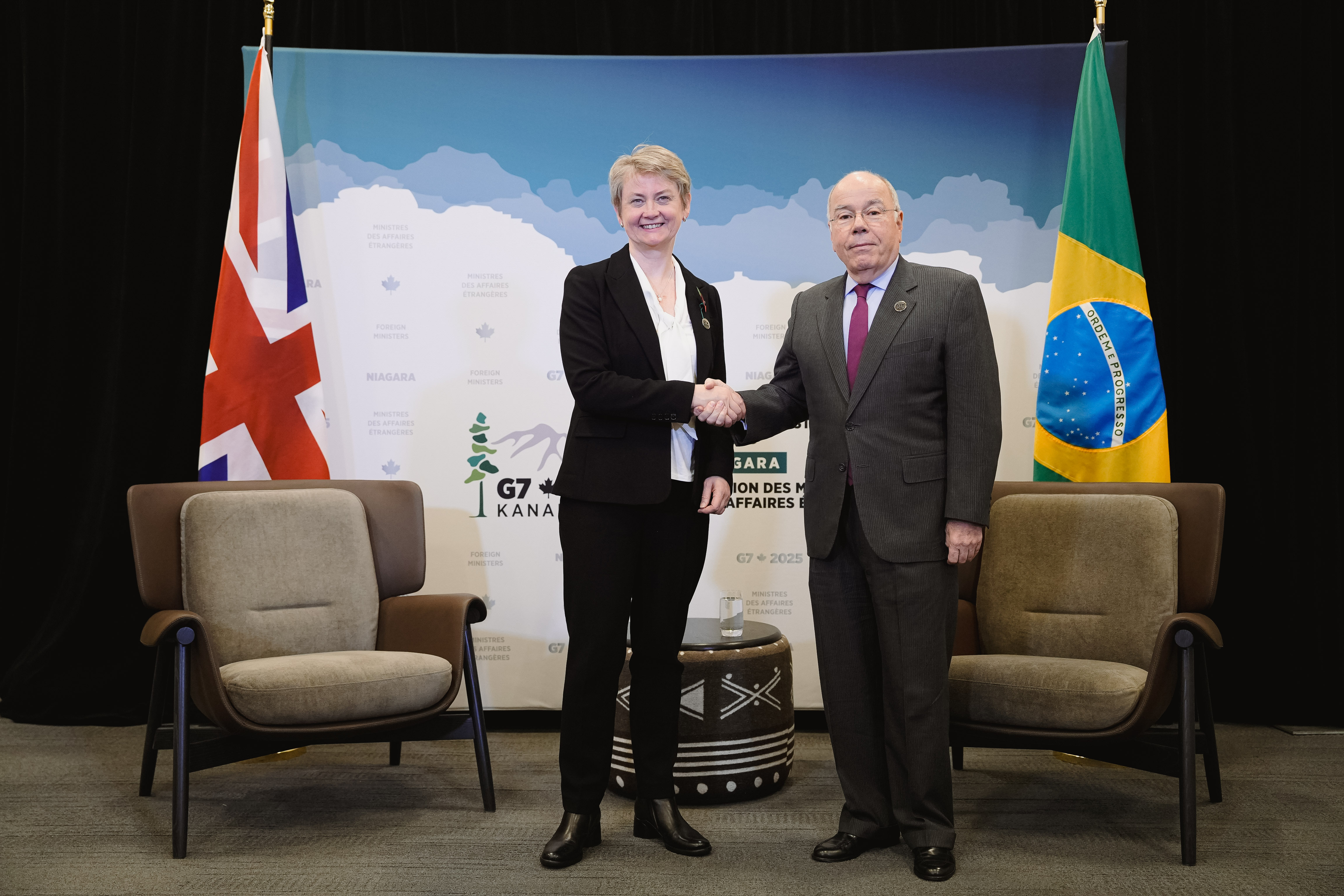
British Foreign Secretary Yvette Cooper meets with Brazilian Foreign Minister Mauro Vieira in Toronto, November 2025.

In January 2020, following the withdrawal of the United Kingdom from the European Union, the UK sought a trade deal with Mercosur, a trade bloc.

On 11 November 2025, Brazilian Foreign Minister Mauro Vieira and British Foreign Secretary Yvette Cooper discussed starting formal negotiations for a free trade agreement between the UK and Mercosur during a G7 Foreign Ministers meeting in Toronto; Brazil agreed to discuss the next steps with trade bloc members, Argentina, Bolivia, Paraguay, and Uruguay.

== High-level visits ==
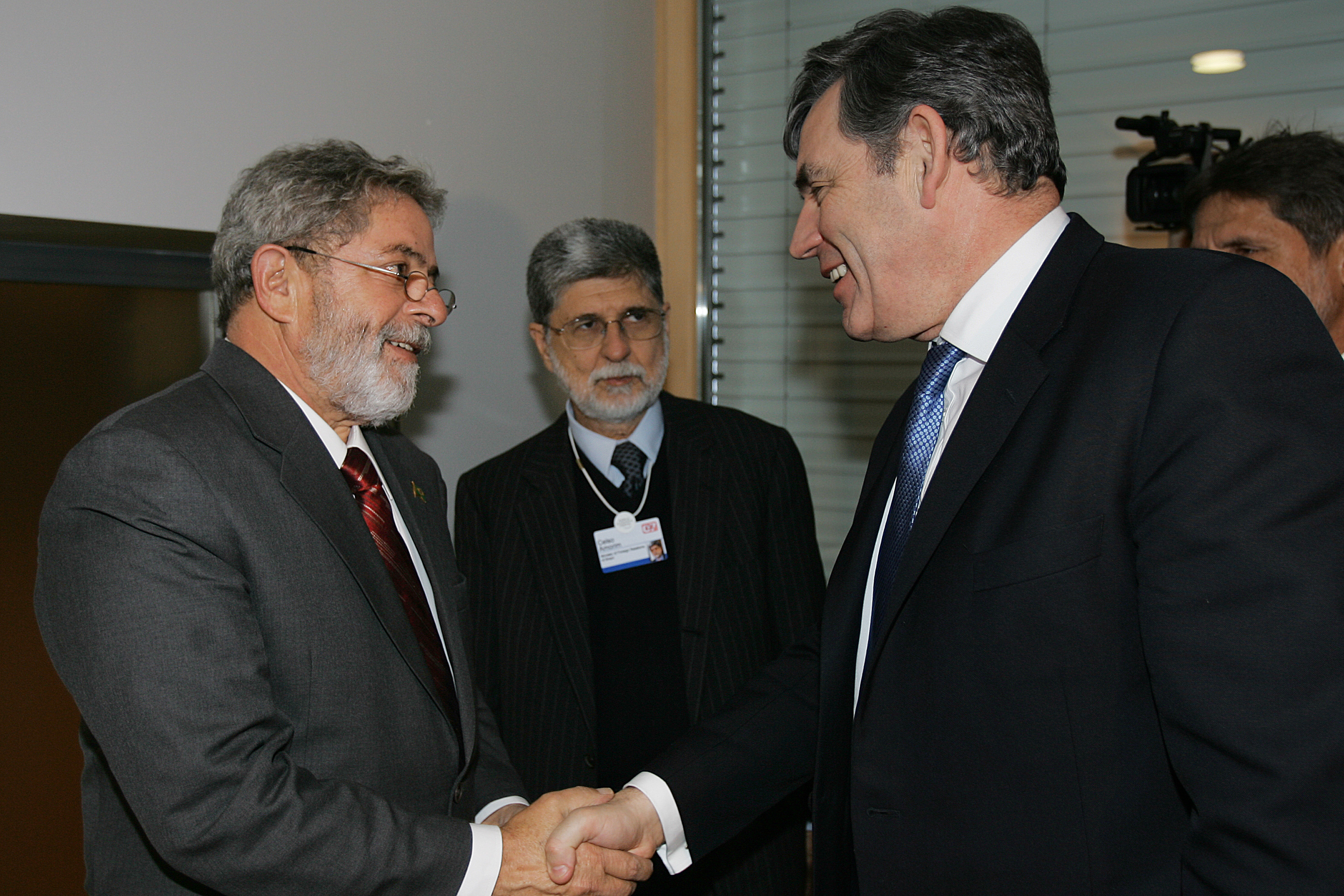
British Prime Minister Gordon Brown and Brazilian President Luiz Inácio Lula da Silva in Davos; 2007.

High-level visits from Brazil to the United Kingdom

- President Fernando Henrique Cardoso (1997)
- President Luiz Inácio Lula da Silva (2003, 2005, 2006, 2009)
- President Dilma Rousseff (2012)
- Foreign Minister Antonio Patriota (2013)
- Foreign Minister Aloysio Nunes (2017)
- President Jair Bolsonaro (2022, for the funeral of Queen Elizabeth II)
- President Luiz Inácio Lula da Silva (2023, for the coronation of Charles III and Camilla)

High-level visits from the United Kingdom to Brazil

- Queen Elizabeth II (1968)
- Prince Charles (1978, 1991, 2002, 2009)
- Prime Minister Tony Blair (2001)
- Secretary of State Margaret Beckett (2006)
- Prime Minister Gordon Brown (2009)
- Prime Minister David Cameron (2012)
- Secretary of State William Hague (2014)
- Prime Minister Keir Starmer attended the 2024 G20 Rio de Janeiro summit, marking the first visit by a British premier to Brazil in 12 years.
- Prime Minister Keir Starmer, Prince William, Energy Secretary Ed Miliband and London Mayor Sadiq Khan attended the 2025 Earthshot Prize, ceremony at the Museum of Tomorrow in Rio de Janeiro. In addition to the COP30 pre-conference in Belém. Marking 200 years of Brazil–United Kingdom diplomatic relations, Starmer held a bilateral meeting with Brazilian President Luiz Inácio Lula da Silva, where the two discussed multilateralism and international collaboration on climate change, joint efforts on clean energy, and the Russian invasion of Ukraine.

== Bilateral agreements ==
Both nations have signed a few agreements such a Treaty to abolish the slave trade (1826); Agreement for the exchange of information relating to tax matters (2011); Memorandum of Understanding to strengthen trade ties and to accelerate the review of patent applications (2018) and an Agreement to promote cooperation on public healthcare (2019).

== Resident diplomatic missions ==
Of Brazil

- London (Embassy)
- Edinburgh (Consulate-General)

Of the United Kingdom

- Brasília (Embassy)
- Recife (Consulate-General)
- Rio de Janeiro (Consulate-General)
- São Paulo (Consulate-General)
- Belo Horizonte (Consulate)

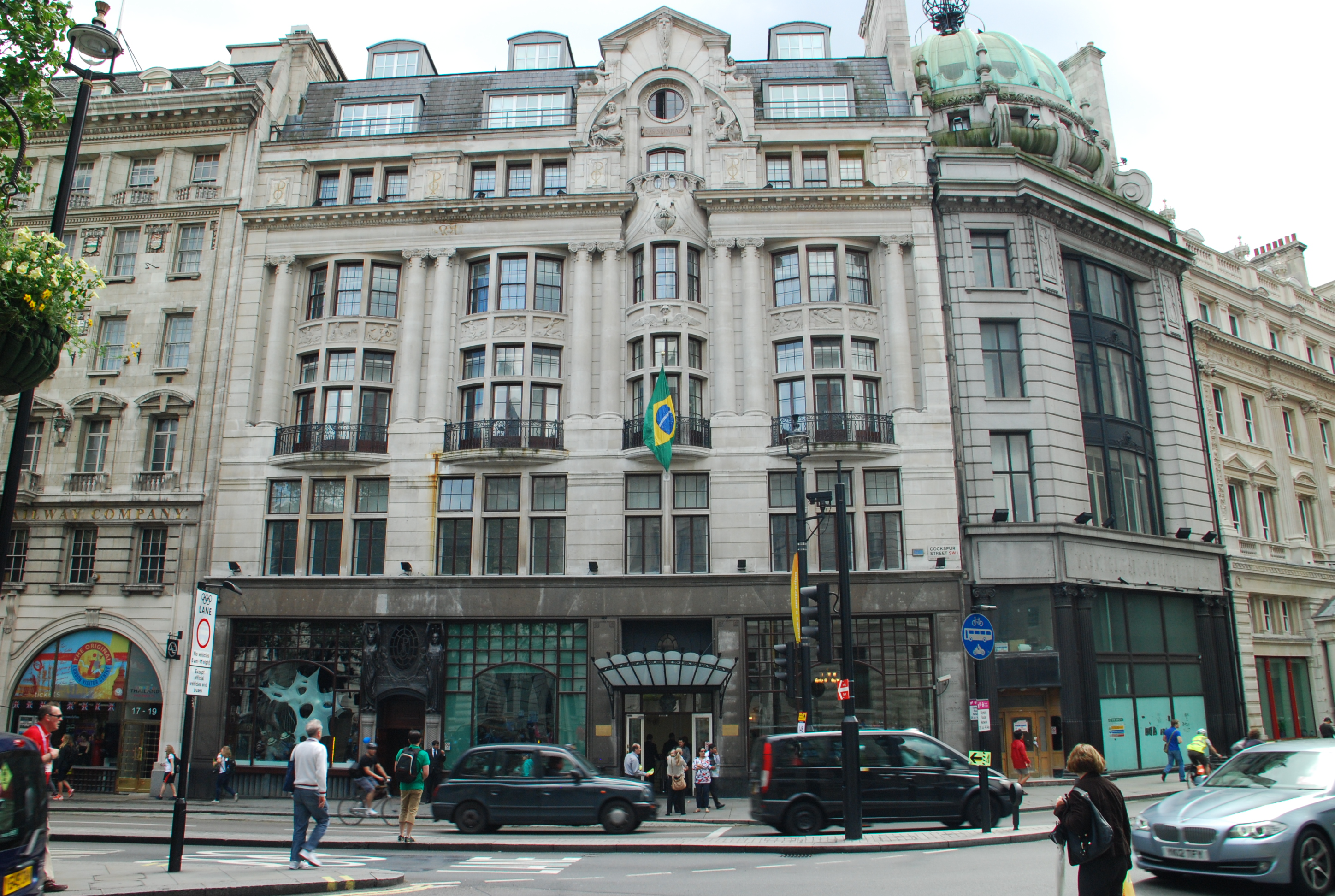
Embassy of Brazil in London

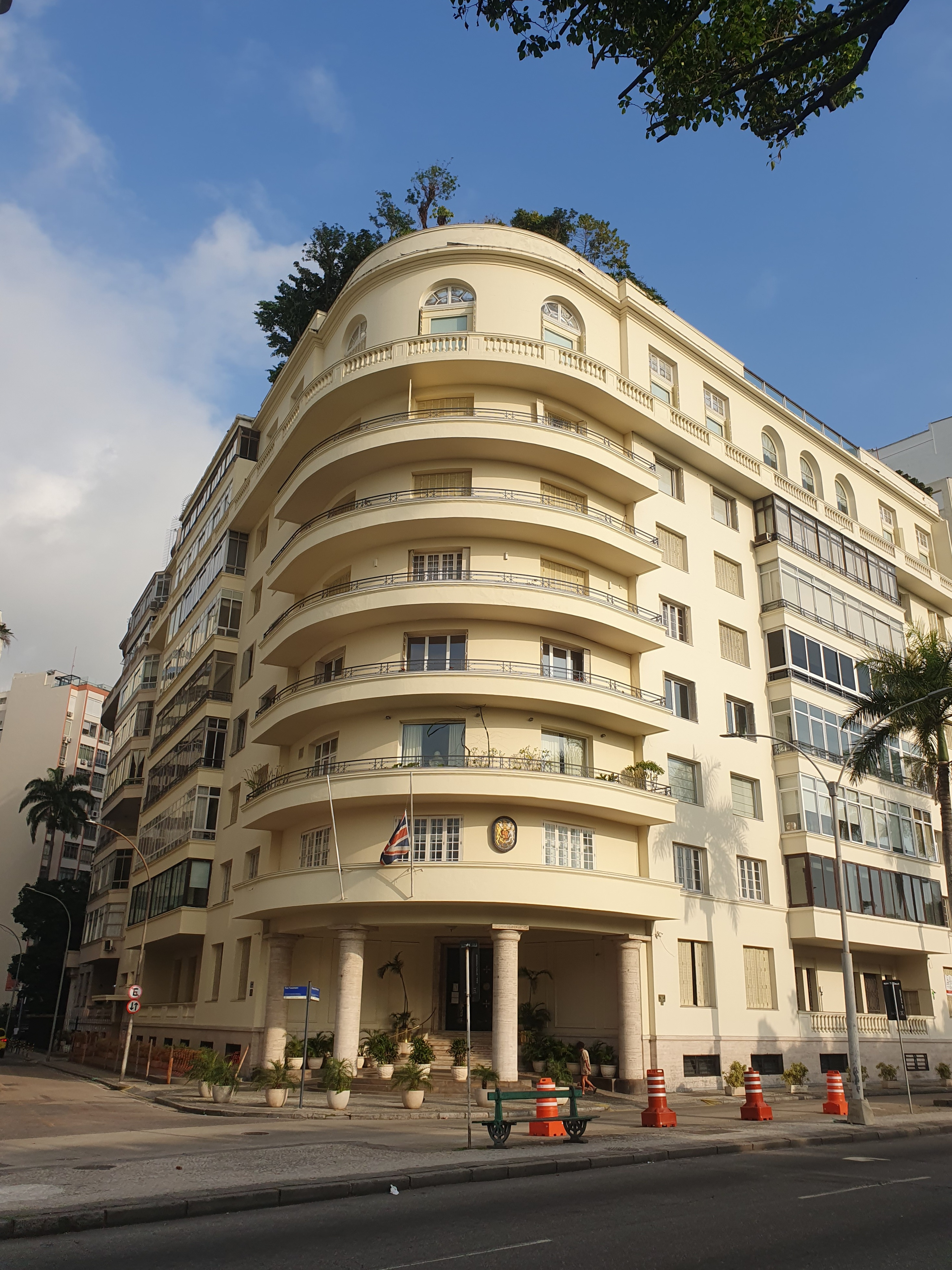
Consulate-General of the United Kingdom in Rio de Janeiro

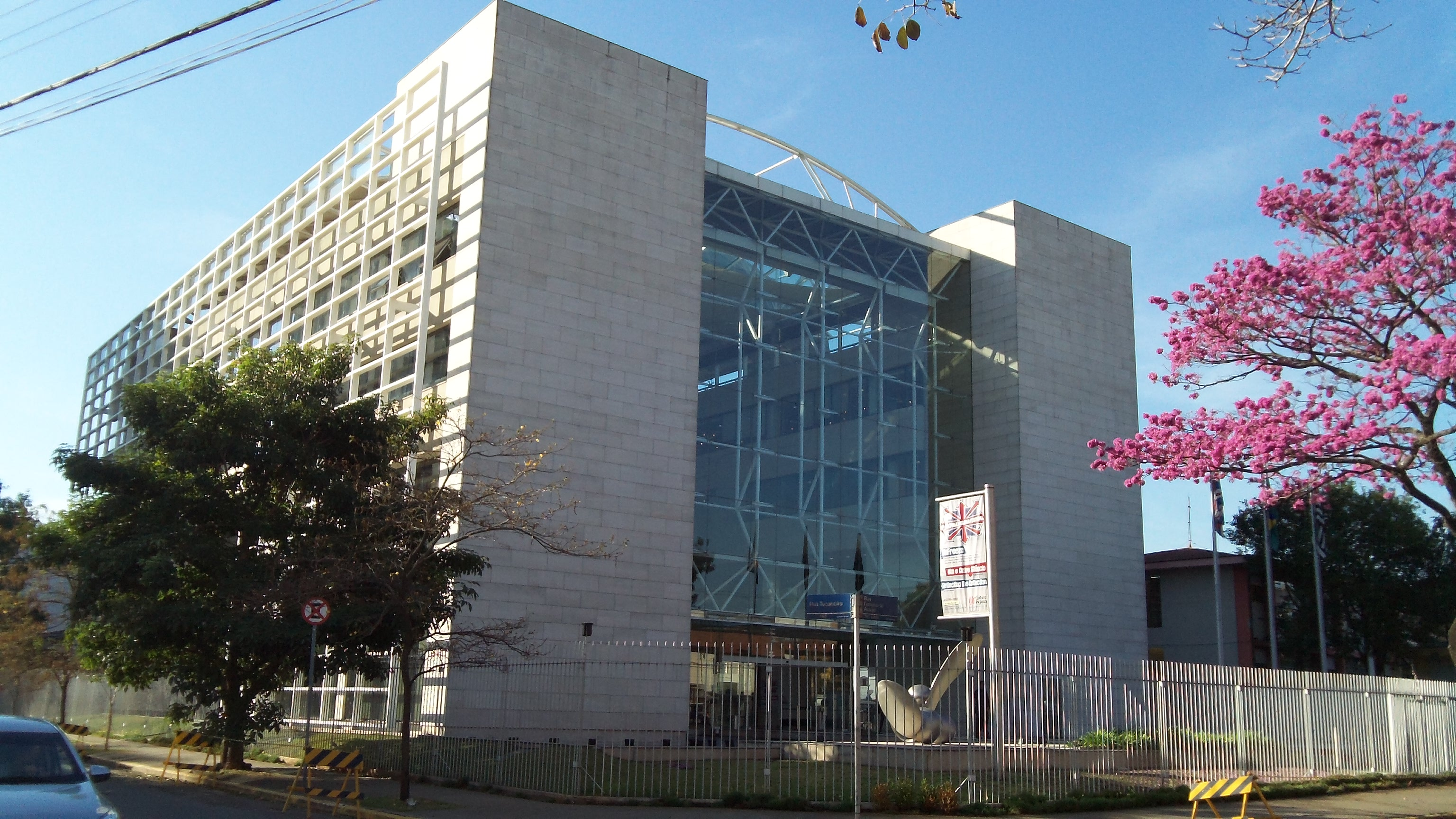
Consulate-General of the United Kingdom in São Paulo

== See also ==
- Brazilians in the United Kingdom
- English Brazilians
- Scottish Brazilians
- List of ambassadors of the United Kingdom to Brazil
