= Trent Affair =

1861 U.S./U.K. diplomatic incident

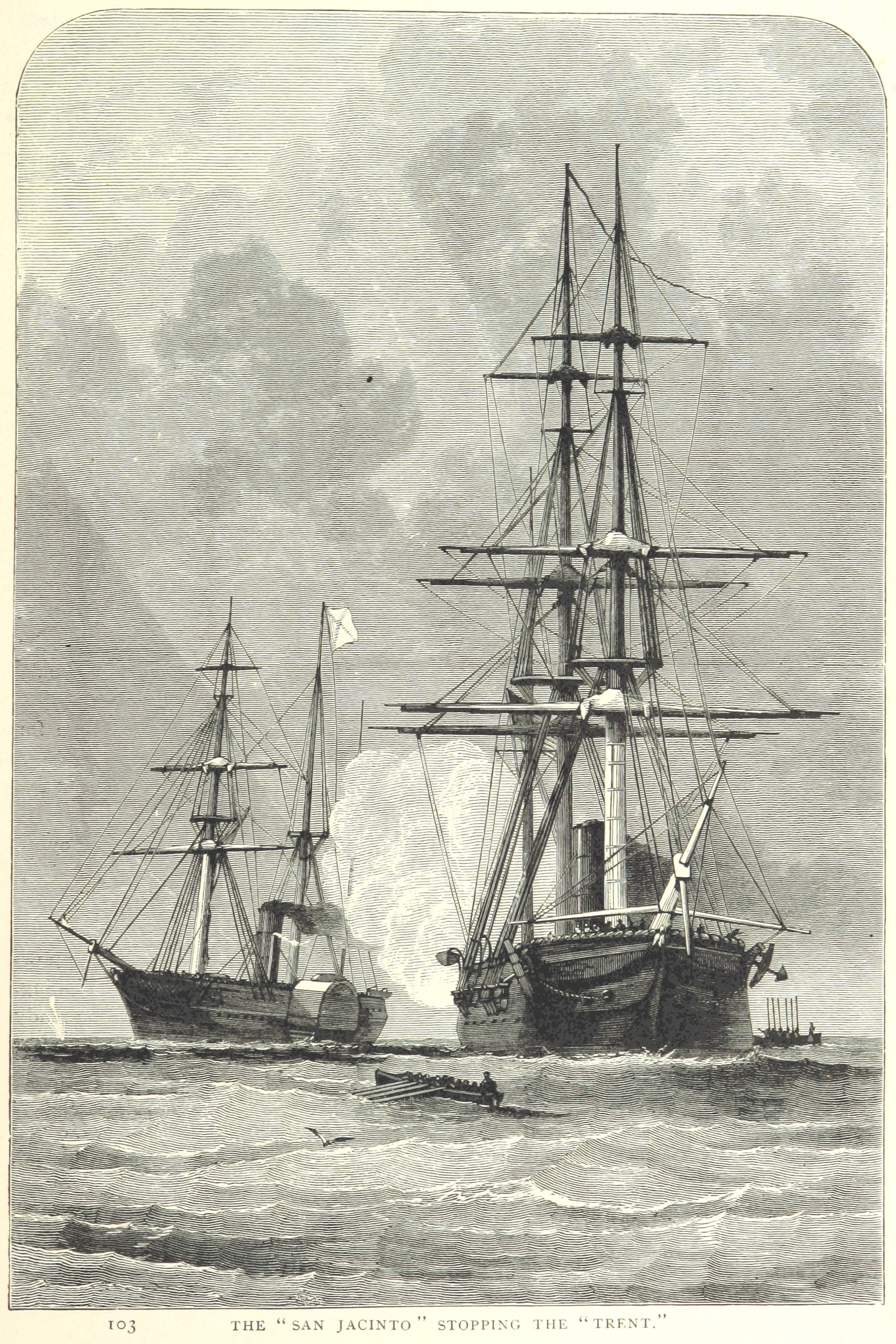
The San Jacinto (right) stopping the Trent

The Trent Affair was a diplomatic incident in 1861 during the American Civil War that threatened a war between the United States and the United Kingdom. The U.S. Navy captured two Confederate envoys from a British Royal Mail steamer; the British government protested vigorously. American public and elite opinion strongly supported the seizure, but it worsened the economy and damaged relations with the world's strongest economy and navy. The Trent Affair would be the closest to a British military intervention in the American Civil War on behalf of the Confederacy and a third Anglo-American war against the Union. President Abraham Lincoln ended the crisis by releasing the envoys.

On November 8, 1861, USS San Jacinto, commanded by Union Captain Charles Wilkes, intercepted the British mail packet RMS Trent and removed, as contraband of war, two Confederate envoys: James Murray Mason from Virginia and John Slidell from Louisiana. The envoys were bound for Britain and France to press the Confederacy's case for diplomatic recognition and to lobby for possible financial and military support.

Public reaction in the United States was to celebrate the capture and rally against Britain, threatening war. In the Confederate States, the hope was that the incident would lead to a permanent rupture in Anglo-American relations and possibly even war, or at least diplomatic recognition by Britain. Confederates realized their cause potentially depended on intervention by Britain and France. In Britain, there was widespread disapproval of this violation of neutral rights and insult to their national honour. The British government demanded an apology and the release of the prisoners and took steps to strengthen its military forces in British North America (Canada) and the North Atlantic.

President Abraham Lincoln and his top advisors did not want to risk war with Britain over this issue. After several tense weeks, the crisis was resolved when the Lincoln administration released the envoys and disavowed Captain Wilkes's actions, largely thanks to Prince Albert of Saxe-Coburg and Gotha's moderation of the British response, though without a formal apology. Mason and Slidell resumed their voyage to Europe.

== Background ==
Relations with the United States were often strained and even verged on war when Britain came near to supporting the Confederacy in the early part of the American Civil War. British leaders were constantly annoyed from the 1840s to the 1860s by what they saw as Washington's pandering to the mob, as in the Oregon boundary dispute of 1844 to 1846. These tensions came to a head during the Trent affair; this time London would draw the line.

The Confederacy and its president, Jefferson Davis, believed from the beginning that European dependence on Southern cotton for its textile industry would lead to diplomatic recognition and intervention, in the form of mediation. Historian Charles Hubbard wrote:

Davis left foreign policy to others in government and, rather than developing an aggressive diplomatic effort, tended to expect events to accomplish diplomatic objectives. The new president was committed to the notion that cotton would secure recognition and legitimacy from the powers of Europe. One of the Confederacy's strongest hopes at the time was the belief that the British, fearing a devastating impact on their textile mills, would recognize the Confederate States and break the Union blockade. The men Davis selected as secretary of state and emissaries to Europe were chosen for political and personal reasons—not for their diplomatic potential. This was due, in part, to the belief that cotton could accomplish the Confederate objectives with little help from Confederate diplomats.

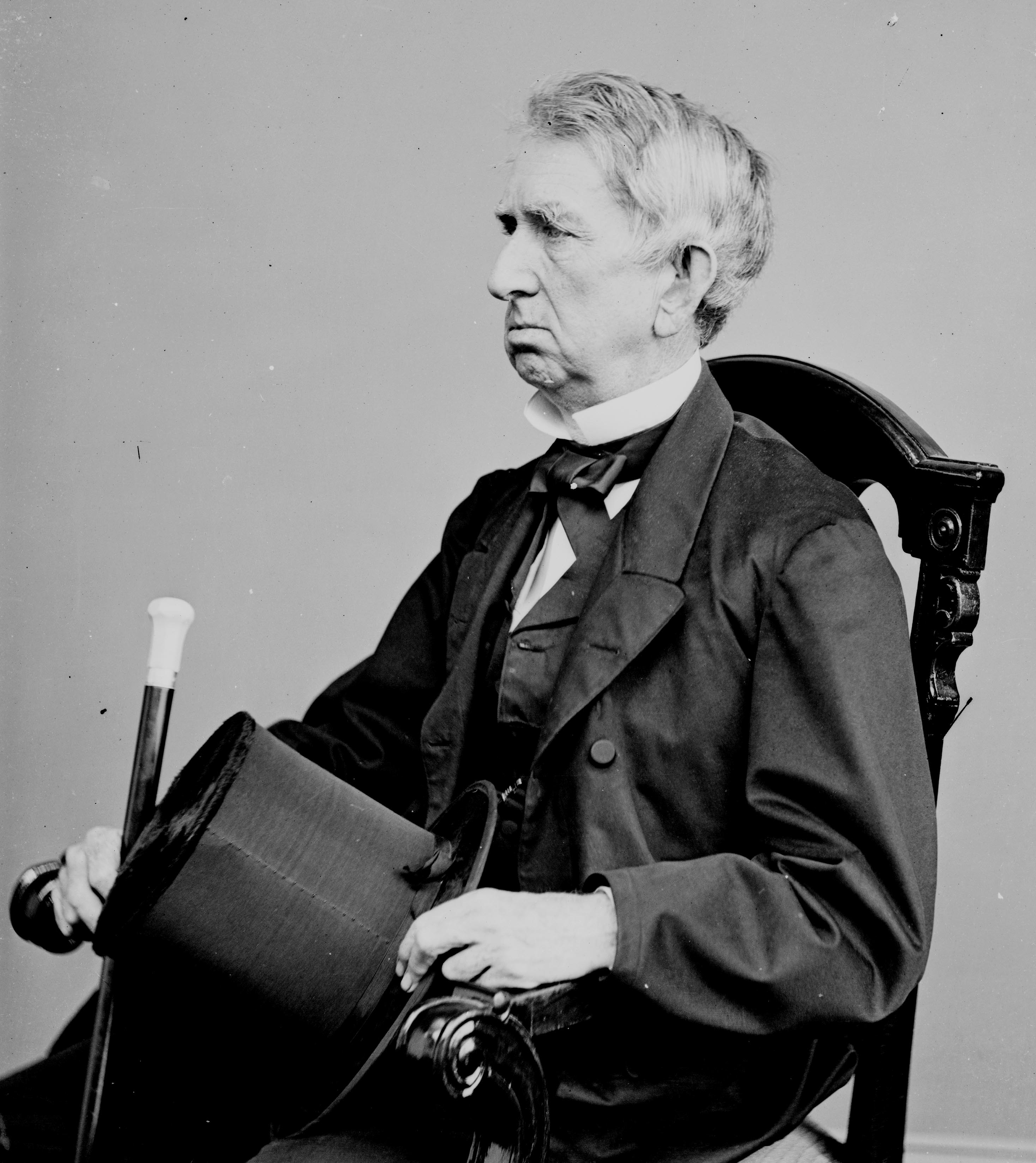
U.S. Secretary of State William H. Seward (1801–1872) (c. 1860–1865)

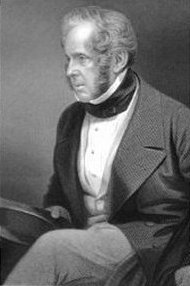
British Prime Minister Henry John Temple, 3rd Viscount Palmerston (1784–1865)

The Union's main focus in foreign affairs was just the opposite: to prevent any British recognition of the Confederacy. The issues of the Oregon boundary dispute, British involvement in Texas, and the Canada–US border dispute had all been resolved in the 1840s, and despite the Pig War of 1859, a minor border incident in the Pacific Northwest, Anglo-American relations had steadily improved throughout the 1850s. Secretary of State William H. Seward, the primary architect of American foreign policy during the war, intended to maintain the policy principles that had served the country well since the American Revolution: non-intervention by the United States in the affairs of other countries and resistance to foreign intervention in the affairs of the United States and other countries in the Western Hemisphere.

British prime minister Lord Palmerston urged a policy of neutrality. His international concerns were centered in Europe, where both Napoleon III's ambitions in Europe and Bismarck's rise in Prussia were occurring. During the Civil War, British reactions to American events were shaped by past British policies and their own national interests, both strategically and economically. In the Western Hemisphere, as relations with the United States improved, Britain had become cautious about confronting the United States over issues in Central America.

As a naval power, Britain had a long record of insisting that neutral nations honor its blockades of hostile countries. From the earliest days of the war, that perspective would guide the British away from taking any action that might have been viewed in Washington as a direct challenge to the Union blockade. From the perspective of the South, British policy amounted to de facto support for the Union blockade and caused great frustration.

The Russian Minister in Washington, Eduard de Stoeckl, noted, "The Cabinet of London is watching attentively the internal dissensions of the Union and awaits the result with an impatience which it has difficulty in disguising." De Stoeckl advised his government that Britain would recognize the Confederate States at its earliest opportunity. Cassius Clay, the US minister in Russia, stated, "I saw at a glance where the feeling of England was. They hoped for our ruin! They are jealous of our power. They care neither for the South nor the North. They hate both."

At the beginning of the Civil War, the U.S. minister to the Court of St. James was Charles Francis Adams. He made clear that Washington considered the war strictly an internal insurrection affording the Confederacy no rights under international law. Any movement by Britain towards officially recognizing the Confederacy would be considered an unfriendly act towards the United States. Seward's instructions to Adams included the suggestion that it be made clear to Britain that a nation with widely scattered possessions, as well as a homeland that included Scotland and Ireland, should be very wary of "set[ting] a dangerous precedent".

Lord Lyons, an experienced diplomat, was the British minister to the US. He warned London about Seward:

I cannot help fearing that he will be a dangerous foreign minister. His view of the relations between the United States and Great Britain had always been that they are a good material to make political capital of.... I do not think Mr. Seward would contemplate actually going to war with us, but he would be well disposed to play the old game of seeking popularity here by displaying violence toward us.

Despite his distrust of Seward, Lyons, throughout 1861, maintained a "calm and measured" diplomacy that contributed to a peaceful resolution to the Trent crisis.

== Issue of diplomatic recognition (February–August 1861) ==
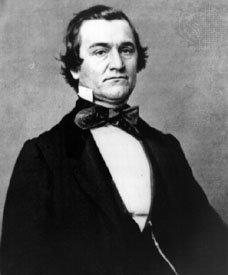
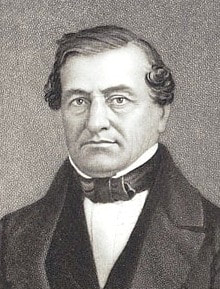
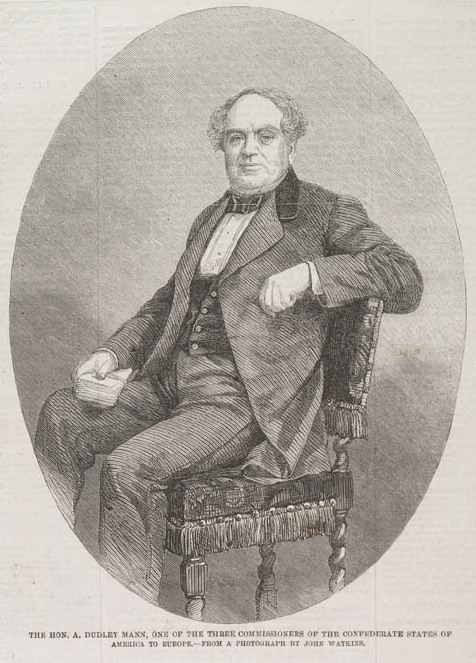
Confederate diplomatic mission to Europe:
William Lowndes Yancey (left), Pierre Adolphe Rost (middle),
Ambrose Dudley Mann (right)

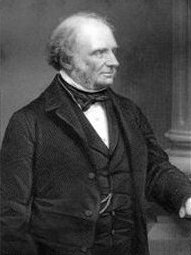
John Russell, 1st Earl Russell (1792–1878)

The Trent affair did not erupt as a major crisis until late November 1861. The first link in the chain of events occurred in February 1861, when the Confederacy created a three-person European delegation consisting of William Lowndes Yancey, Pierre Rost, and Ambrose Dudley Mann. Their instructions from Confederate Secretary of State Robert Toombs were to explain to these governments the nature and purposes of the southern cause, to open diplomatic relations, and to "negotiate treaties of friendship, commerce, and navigation". Toombs' instructions included a long legal argument on states' rights and the right of secession. Because of the reliance on the double attack of cotton and legality, many important issues were absent from the instructions including the blockade of Southern ports, privateering, trade with the North, slavery, and the informal blockade the Southerners had imposed whereby no cotton was being shipped out.

British leaders—and those on the Continent—generally believed that division of the U.S. was inevitable. Remembering their own unsuccessful attempt to keep their former American colonies in the Empire by force of arms, the British considered Union efforts to resist a fait accompli to be unreasonable, but they also viewed Union resistance as a fact that they had to deal with. Believing the war's outcome to be predetermined, the British saw any action they could take to encourage the end of the war as a humanitarian gesture. Lyons was instructed by Foreign Secretary Lord Russell to use his own office and any other parties who might promote a settlement of the war.

The commissioners met informally with Russell on May 3. Although word of Fort Sumter had just reached London, the immediate implications of open warfare were not discussed at the meeting. Instead the envoys emphasized the peaceful intent of their new nation and the legality of secession as a remedy to Northern violations of states' rights. They closed with their strongest argument: the importance of cotton to Europe. Slavery was discussed only when Russell asked Yancey whether the international slave trade would be reopened by the Confederacy (a position Yancey had advocated in recent years); Yancey's reply was that this was not part of the Confederacy's agenda. Russell was noncommittal, promising the matters raised would be discussed with the full Cabinet.

In the meantime, the British were attempting to determine what official stance they should have to the war. On May 13, 1861, on the recommendation of Russell, Queen Victoria issued a declaration of neutrality that served as recognition of Southern belligerency—a status that provided Confederate ships the same privileges in foreign ports that U.S. ships received.

Confederate ships could obtain fuel, supplies and repairs in neutral ports but could not secure military equipment or arms. The availability of Britain's far-flung colonial ports made it possible for Confederate ships to pursue Union shipping throughout much of the world. France, Spain, the Netherlands, and Brazil followed suit. Belligerency also gave the Confederate government the opportunity to purchase supplies, contract with British companies, and purchase a navy to search out and seize Union ships. The Queen's proclamation made clear that Britons were prohibited from joining the military of either side, equipping any ships for military use in the war, breaking any proper blockade, and transporting military goods, documents, or personnel to either side.

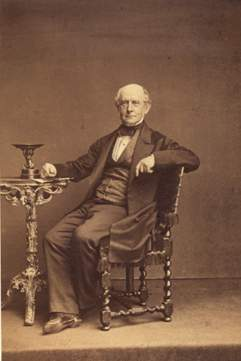
Charles Francis Adams, Sr. (1807–1886)

On May 18, Adams met with Russell to protest the declaration of neutrality. Adams argued that Great Britain had recognized a state of belligerency "before they [the Confederacy] had ever showed their capacity to maintain any kind of warfare whatever, except within one of their own harbors under every possible advantage […] it considered them a maritime power before they had ever exhibited a single privateer upon the ocean." The major United States concern at this point was that the recognition of belligerency was the first step towards diplomatic recognition. While Russell indicated that recognition was not currently being considered, he would not rule it out in the future, although he did agree to notify Adams if the government's position changed.

Meanwhile, in Washington, Seward was upset with both the proclamation of neutrality and Russell's meetings with the Confederates. In a May 21 letter to Adams, which he instructed Adams to share with the British, Seward protested the British reception of the Confederate envoys and ordered Adams to have no dealings with the British as long as they were meeting with them. Formal recognition would make Britain an enemy of the United States. President Lincoln reviewed the letter, softened the language, and told Adams not to give Russell a copy but to limit himself to quoting only those portions that Adams thought appropriate. Adams in turn was shocked by even the revised letter, feeling that it almost amounted to a threat to wage war against all of Europe. When he met with Russell on June 12, after receiving the dispatch, Adams was told that Great Britain had often met with representatives of rebels against nations that Great Britain was at peace with, but that he had no further intention of meeting with the Confederate mission.

Further problems developed over possible diplomatic recognition when, in mid-August, Seward became aware that Britain was secretly negotiating with the Confederacy in order to obtain its agreement to abide by the Declaration of Paris. The 1856 Declaration of Paris prohibited signatories from commissioning privateers against other signatories, protected neutral goods shipped to belligerents except for "contrabands of war", and recognized blockades only if they were proved effective. The United States had failed to sign the treaty originally, but after the Union declared a blockade of the Confederacy, Seward ordered the U.S. ministers to Britain and France to reopen negotiations to restrict the Confederate use of privateers.

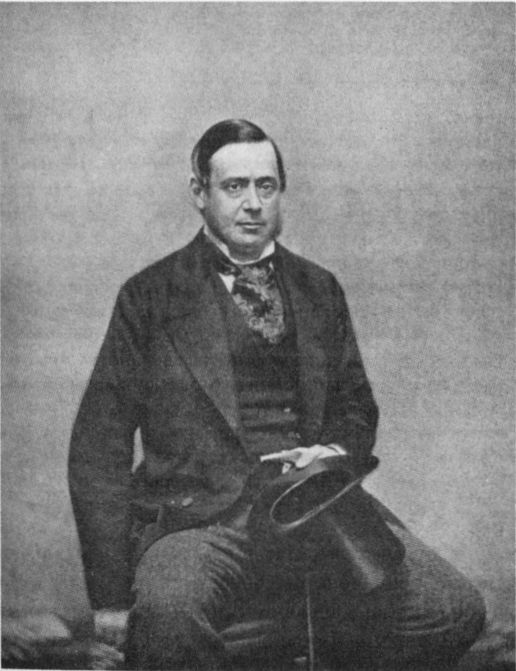
Richard Bickerton Pemell Lyons, 1st Viscount Lyons

On May 18 Russell had instructed Lyons to seek Confederate agreement to abide by the Paris Declaration. Lyons assigned this task to Robert Bunch, the British consul in Charleston, South Carolina, who was directed to contact South Carolina Governor Francis Wilkinson Pickens. Bunch exceeded his instructions: he bypassed Pickens, and openly assured the Confederates that agreement to the Paris Declaration was "the first step to [British] recognition". His indiscretion soon came to Union ears. Robert Mure, a British-born Charleston merchant, was arrested in New York. Mure, a colonel in the South Carolina militia, had a British diplomatic passport issued by Bunch, and was carrying a British diplomatic pouch (which was searched). The pouch contained some actual correspondence from Bunch to Britain, and also pro-Confederate pamphlets, personal letters from Southerners to European correspondents, and a Confederate dispatch which recounted Bunch's dealings with the Confederacy, including the talk of recognition.

When confronted, Russell admitted that his government was attempting to get agreement from the Confederacy to adhere to the provisions of the treaty relating to neutral goods (but not privateering), but he denied that this was in any way a step towards extending diplomatic relations to the Confederates. Rather than reacting as he had to the earlier recognition of belligerency, Seward let this matter drop. He did demand Bunch's recall, but Russell refused.

Under Napoleon III, France's overall foreign policy objectives were at odds with Britain's, but France generally took positions regarding the Civil War combatants similar to, and often supportive of, Britain's. Cooperation between Britain and France was begun in the U.S. between Henri Mercier, the French minister, and Lyons. For example, on June 15 they tried to see Seward together regarding the proclamation of neutrality, but Seward insisted that he meet with them separately.

Edouard Thouvenel was the French Foreign Minister for all of 1861 until the fall of 1862. He was generally perceived to be pro-Union and was influential in damping Napoleon III's initial inclination towards diplomatic recognition of Confederate independence. Thouvenel met unofficially with Confederate envoy Pierre Rost in June and told him not to expect diplomatic recognition.

William L. Dayton of New Jersey was appointed by Lincoln as U.S. minister to France. He had no foreign affairs experience and did not speak French, but was assisted a great deal by the U.S. consul general in Paris, John Bigelow. When Adams made his protest to Russell on the recognition of Confederate belligerency, Dayton made a similar protest to Thouvenel. Napoleon offered "his good office" to the United States in resolving the conflict with the South and Dayton was directed by Seward to acknowledge that "if any mediation were at all admissible, it would be his own that we should seek or accept."

When news of the Confederate victory at the First Battle of Bull Run reached Europe it reinforced British opinion that Confederate independence was inevitable. Hoping to take advantage of this battlefield success, Yancey requested a meeting with Russell but was rebuffed and told that any communications should be in writing. Yancey submitted a long letter on August 14 detailing again the reasons why the Confederacy should receive formal recognition and requesting another meeting with Russell. Russell's August 24 reply, directed to the commissioners "of the so-styled Confederate States of America" reiterated the British position that it considered the war as an internal matter rather than a war for independence. British policy would change only if "the fortune of arms or the more peaceful mode of negotiation shall have determined the respective positions of the two belligerents." No meeting was scheduled and this was the last communication between the British government and the Confederate envoys. When the Trent Affair erupted in November and December the Confederacy had no effective way to communicate directly with Great Britain and they were left totally out of the negotiation process.

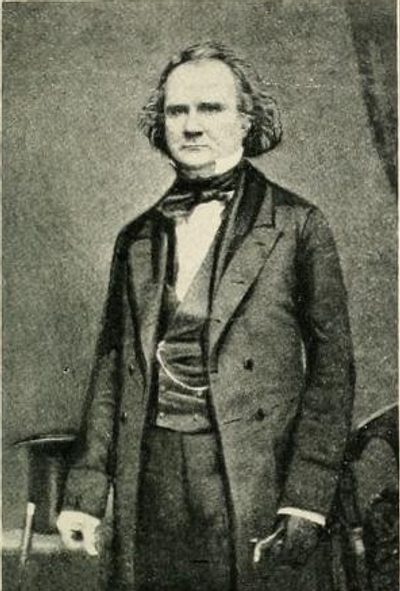
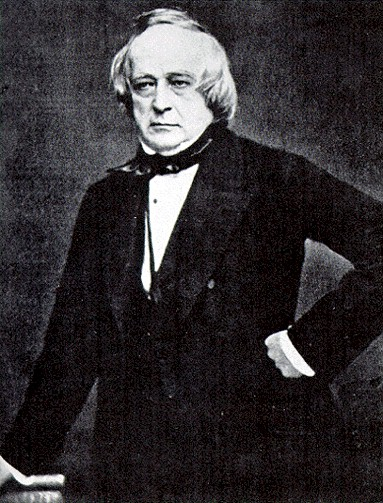
Confederate envoys James Murray Mason (1798–1871, left) and John Slidell (1793–1871, right)

By August 1861, Yancey was sick, frustrated, and ready to resign. In the same month, President Davis had decided that he needed diplomats in Britain and France. Specifically, ministers that would be better suited to serve as Confederate ministers, should the Confederacy achieve international recognition. He selected John Slidell of Louisiana and James Mason of Virginia. Both men were widely respected throughout the South, and had some background in foreign affairs. Slidell had been appointed as a negotiator by President Polk at the end of the Mexican War, and Mason had been chairman of the Senate Foreign Relations Committee from 1847 to 1860.

R. M. T. Hunter of Virginia was the new Confederate Secretary of State. His instructions to Mason and Slidell were to emphasize the stronger position of the Confederacy now that it had expanded from seven to eleven states, with the likelihood that Maryland, Missouri, and Kentucky would also eventually join the new nation. An independent Confederacy would restrict the industrial and maritime ambitions of the United States and lead to a mutually beneficial commercial alliance between Great Britain, France, and the Confederate States. A balance of power would be restored in the Western Hemisphere as the United States' territorial ambitions would be restricted. They were to liken the Confederate situation to Italy's struggles for independence which Britain had supported, and were to quote Russell's own letters which justified that support. Of immediate importance, they were to make a detailed argument against the legality of the Union blockade. Along with their formal written instructions, Mason and Slidell carried a number of documents supporting their positions.

== Pursuit and capture (August–November 1861) ==
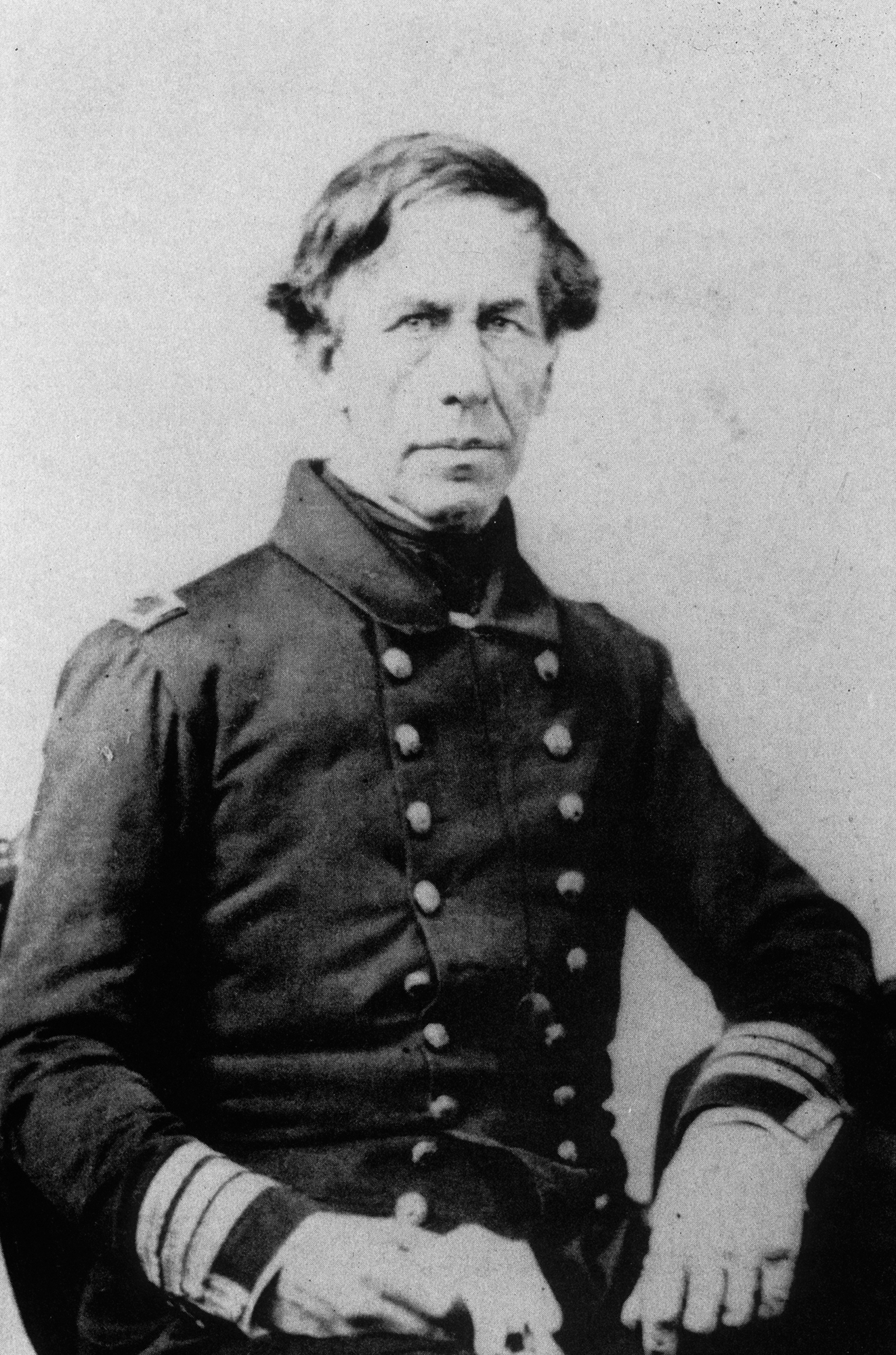
Charles Wilkes

The intended departure of the envoys was no secret, and the Union government received daily intelligence on their movements. By October 1 Slidell and Mason were in Charleston, South Carolina. Their original plan was to run the blockade in CSS Nashville, a fast steamer, and sail directly to Britain. But the main channel into Charleston was guarded by five Union ships, and Nashville's draft was too deep for any side channels. A night escape was considered, but tides and strong night winds prevented this. An overland route through Mexico and departure from Matamoros was also considered, but the delay of several months was unacceptable.

The steamer Gordon was suggested as an alternative. She had a shallow enough draft to use the back channels and could make over 12 knots, more than enough to elude Union pursuit. Gordon was offered to the Confederate government either as a purchase for $62,000 or as a charter for $10,000. The Confederate Treasury could not afford this, but a local cotton broker, George Trenholm, paid the $10,000 in return for half the cargo space on the return trip. Renamed Theodora, the ship left Charleston at 1 a.m. on October 12, and successfully evaded Union ships enforcing the blockade. On October 14, she arrived at Nassau in the Bahamas, but had missed connections with a British steamer going to St. Thomas in the Danish West Indies, the main point of departure for British ships from the Caribbean to Britain. They discovered that British mail ships might be anchored in Spanish Cuba, and Theodora turned southwest towards Cuba. Theodora appeared off the coast of Cuba on October 15, with her coal bunkers nearly empty. An approaching Spanish warship hailed Theodora. Slidell and George Eustis Jr. went aboard, and were informed that British mail packets docked at Havana, but that the last one had just left, and that the next one, the paddle steamer RMS Trent, would arrive in three weeks. Theodora docked in Cárdenas, Cuba on October 16, and Mason and Slidell disembarked. The two men decided to stay in Cardenas before making an overland trip to Havana to catch the next British ship.

Meanwhile, rumors reached the Federal government that Mason and Slidell had escaped aboard Nashville. Union intelligence had not immediately recognized that Mason and Slidell had left Charleston on Theodora. U.S. Navy Secretary Gideon Welles reacted to the rumor that Mason and Slidell had escaped from Charleston by ordering Admiral Samuel F. DuPont to dispatch a fast warship to Britain to intercept Nashville. On October 15, the Union sidewheel steamer USS James Adger, under the command of John B. Marchand, began steaming towards Europe with orders to pursue Nashville to the English Channel if necessary. James Adger reached Britain and docked in Southampton Harbor in early November. The British government was aware that the United States would attempt to capture the envoys and believed they were on Nashville. Palmerston ordered a Royal Navy warship to patrol within the three-mile limit around Nashville's expected port of call, to assure that any capture would occur outside British territorial waters. This would avoid the diplomatic crisis that would result if James Adger pursued Nashville into British waters. When Nashville arrived on November 21, the British were surprised that the envoys were not on board.

The Union steam frigate USS San Jacinto, commanded by Captain Charles Wilkes, arrived in St. Thomas on October 13. San Jacinto had cruised off the African coast for nearly a month before setting course westward with orders to join a U.S. Navy force preparing to attack Port Royal, South Carolina. In St. Thomas, Wilkes learned that the Confederate raider CSS Sumter had captured three U.S. merchant ships near Cienfuegos in July. Wilkes headed there, despite the unlikelihood that Sumter would have remained in the area. In Cienfuegos he learned from a newspaper that Mason and Slidell were scheduled to leave Havana on November 7 in the British mail packet RMS Trent, bound first for St. Thomas and then England. He realized that the ship would need to use the "narrow Bahama Channel, the only deepwater route between Cuba and the shallow Grand Bahama Bank". Wilkes discussed legal options with his second in command, Lt. D. M. Fairfax, and reviewed law books on the subject before making plans to intercept. Wilkes adopted the position that Mason and Slidell would qualify as "contraband", subject to seizure by a United States ship. Historians have concluded that there was no legal precedent for the seizure.

This aggressive decision making was typical of Wilkes' command style. On one hand, he was recognized as "a distinguished explorer, author, and naval officer". On the other, he "had a reputation as a stubborn, overzealous, impulsive, and sometimes insubordinate officer". Treasury officer George Harrington had warned Seward about Wilkes: "He will give us trouble. He has a superabundance of self-esteem and a deficiency of judgment. When he commanded his great exploring mission he court-martialed nearly all his officers; he alone was right, everybody else was wrong."

Trent left on November 7 as scheduled, with Mason, Slidell, their secretaries, and Slidell's wife and children aboard. Just as Wilkes had predicted, Trent passed through Bahama Channel, where San Jacinto was waiting. Around noon on November 8, lookouts aboard the San Jacinto spotted Trent, which unfurled the Union Jack as it neared. San Jacinto then fired a shot across the bow of Trent, which Captain James Moir of Trent ignored. San Jacinto fired a second shot from her forward pivot gun which landed right in front of Trent. Trent stopped after the second shot. Lieutenant Fairfax was summoned to the quarterdeck, where Wilkes presented him with the following written instructions:

On boarding her you will demand the papers of the steamer, her clearance from Havana, with the list of passengers and crew.

Should Mr. Mason, Mr. Slidell, Mr. Eustice [sic] and Mr. McFarland be on board make them prisoners and send them on board this ship and take possession of her [the Trent] as a prize. … They must be brought on board.

All trunks, cases, packages and bags belonging to them you will take possession of and send on board this ship; any dispatches found on the persons of the prisoners, or in possession of those on board the steamer, will be taken possession of, examined, and retained if necessary.

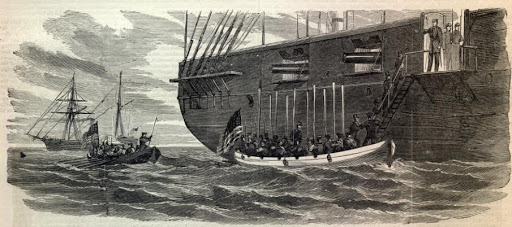
Sailors of San Jacinto boarded Trent

Fairfax then boarded Trent from a cutter. Two cutters carrying a party of twenty men armed with pistols and cutlasses came alongside Trent. Fairfax, certain that Wilkes was creating an international incident and not wanting to enlarge its scope, ordered his armed escort to remain in the cutter. Upon boarding, Fairfax was escorted to an outraged Captain Moir, and announced that he had orders "to arrest Mr. Mason and Mr. Slidell and their secretaries, and send them prisoners on board the United States war vessel nearby". The crew and passengers then threatened Lieutenant Fairfax, and the armed party in the two cutters beside Trent responded to the threats by climbing aboard to protect him. Captain Moir refused Fairfax's request for a passenger list, but Slidell and Mason came forward and identified themselves. Moir also refused to allow a search of the vessel for contraband, and Fairfax failed to force the issue which would have required seizing the ship as a prize, arguably an act of war. Mason and Slidell made a formal refusal to go voluntarily with Fairfax, but did not resist when Fairfax's crewmen escorted them to the cutter.

Wilkes would later claim that he believed that Trent was carrying "highly important dispatches and were endowed with instructions inimical to the United States". Along with the failure of Fairfax to insist on a search of Trent, there was another reason why no papers were found in the luggage that was carried with the envoys. Mason's daughter, writing in 1906, said that the Confederate dispatch bag had been secured by Commander Williams RN, a passenger on Trent, and later delivered to the Confederate envoys in London. This was a clear violation of the Queen's Neutrality Proclamation.

International law required that when "contraband" was discovered on a ship, the ship should be taken to the nearest prize court for adjudication. While this was Wilkes' initial determination, Fairfax argued against this since transferring crew from San Jacinto to Trent would leave San Jacinto dangerously undermanned, and it would seriously inconvenience Trent's other passengers as well as mail recipients. Wilkes, whose ultimate responsibility it was, agreed and the ship was allowed to proceed to St. Thomas, absent the two Confederate envoys and their secretaries.

San Jacinto arrived in Hampton Roads, Virginia, on November 15, where Wilkes wired news of the capture to Washington. He was then ordered to Boston where he delivered the captives to Fort Warren, a prison for captured Confederates.

== American reaction (November 16 – December 18, 1861) ==
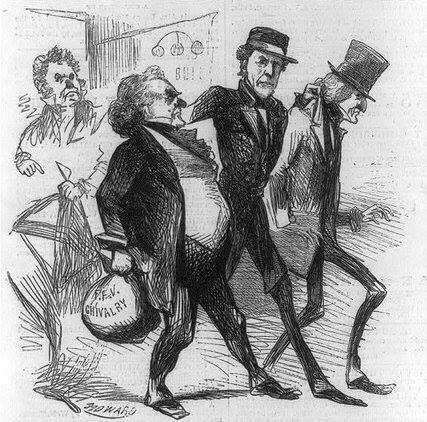
The comics published in the newspapers after the affair

Most Northerners learned of the Trent capture on November 16 when the news hit afternoon newspapers. By Monday, November 18, the press seemed "universally engulfed in a massive wave of chauvinistic elation". Everyone was eager to present a legal justification for the capture. Many newspapers argued for the legality of Wilkes' actions, and numerous lawyers stepped forward to add their approval. Harvard law professor Theophilus Parsons defended the action, as did Caleb Cushing, a former Attorney General and many other legal experts.

On December 2, Congress passed unanimously a resolution thanking Wilkes "for his brave, adroit and patriotic conduct in the arrest and detention of the traitors, James M. Mason and John Slidell" and proposing that he receive a "gold medal with suitable emblems and devices, in testimony of the high sense entertained by Congress of his good conduct".

But as the matter was given closer study, experts began to have doubts. Secretary of the Navy Gideon Welles reflected the ambiguity that many felt when he wrote to Wilkes of "the emphatic approval" of the Navy Department for his actions while cautioning him that the failure to take the Trent to a prize court "must by no means be permitted to constitute a precedent hereafter for the treatment of any case of similar infraction of neutral obligations". On November 24, the New York Times claimed to find no actual on point precedent. Thurlow Weed's Albany Evening Journal suggested that, if Wilkes had "exercised an unwarranted discretion, our government will properly disavow the proceedings and grant England 'every satisfaction' consistent with honor and justice". It did not take long for others to comment that the capture of Mason and Slidell very much resembled the search and impressment practices that the United States had always opposed since its founding and which had previously led to the War of 1812 with Britain. The idea of humans as contraband failed to strike a resonant chord with many.

Leaders also started to realize that the issue might be resolved less on legalities and more on the necessity of avoiding a serious conflict with Britain. Elder statesmen James Buchanan, Thomas Ewing, Lewis Cass, and Robert J. Walker all publicly came out for the necessity of releasing them. By the third week of December much of the editorial opinion started to mirror these opinions and prepare the American citizens for the release of the prisoners. The opinion that Wilkes had operated without orders and had erred by, in effect, holding a prize court on the deck of the San Jacinto was being spread.

The United States was initially very reluctant to back down. Seward had lost the initial opportunity to immediately release the two envoys as an affirmation of a long-held U.S. interpretation of international law. He had written to Adams at the end of November that Wilkes had not acted under instructions, but would hold back any more information until it had received some response from Great Britain. He reiterated that recognition of the Confederacy would likely lead to war.

Lincoln was at first enthused about the capture and reluctant to let them go, but as reality set in he stated:

I fear the traitors will prove to be white elephants. We must stick to American principles concerning the rights of neutrals. We fought Great Britain for insisting … on the right to do precisely what Captain Wilkes has done. If Great Britain shall now protest against the act, and demand their release, we must give them up, apologize for the act as a violation of our doctrines, and thus forever bind her over to keep the peace in relation to neutrals, and so acknowledge that she has been wrong for sixty years.

On December 4, Lincoln met with Alexander Galt, the future Canadian Minister of Finance. Lincoln told him that he had no desire for troubles with England or any unfriendly designs toward Canada. When Galt asked specifically about the Trent incident, Lincoln replied, "Oh, that'll be got along with." Galt forwarded his account of the meeting to Lyons who forwarded it to Russell. Galt wrote that, despite Lincoln's assurances, "I cannot, however, divest my mind of the impression that the policy of the American Govt is so subject to popular impulses, that no assurance can be or ought to be relied on under present circumstances." Lincoln's annual message to Congress did not touch directly on the Trent affair but, relying on estimates from Secretary of War Simon Cameron that the U.S. could field a 3,000,000-man army, stated that he could "show the world, that while engaged in quelling disturbances at home we are able to protect ourselves from abroad".

Finance also played a role: Treasury Secretary Salmon P. Chase was concerned with any events that might affect American interests in Europe. Chase was aware of the intent of New York banks to suspend gold payments, and he would later make a lengthy argument to the cabinet in support of Seward. Chase felt that the release of Mason and Slidell was very annoying but it was necessary to support the economy. Warren concludes that the diplomatic crisis worsened the financial crisis.

On December 15 the first news on British reaction reached the United States. Britain first learned of the events on November 27. Lincoln was with Senator Orville Browning when Seward brought in the first newspaper dispatches, which indicated Palmerston was demanding a release of the prisoners and an apology. Browning thought the threat of war by Britain was "foolish" but said, "We will fight her to the death." That night at a diplomatic reception Seward was overheard by William H. Russell saying, "We will wrap the whole world in flames." The mood in Congress had also changed. When they debated the issue on December 16 and 17, Clement L. Vallandigham, a peace Democrat, proposed a resolution stating that the U.S. maintain the seizure as a matter of honor. The motion was opposed and referred to a committee by the vote of 109 to 16. The official response of the government still awaited the formal British response which did not arrive in America until December 18.

== British reaction (November 27 – December 31, 1861) ==
When USS James Adger arrived in Southampton and Commander Marchand learned from The Times that his targets had arrived in Cuba, he reacted to the news by boasting that he would capture the two envoys within sight of the British shore if necessary, even if they were on a British ship. As a result of the concerns raised by Marchand's statements, the British Foreign Office requested a judicial opinion from the three Law Officers of the Crown (the queen's advocate, the attorney general, and the solicitor general) on the legality of capturing the men from a British ship. The written reply dated November 12 declared:

The United States' man-of-war falling in with the British mail steamer [this was the example used in the hypothetical submitted by the cabinet] beyond the territorial limits of the United Kingdom might cause her to bring-to, might board her, examine her papers, open the general mail bags, and examine the contents thereof, without, however opening any mail bag or packet addressed to any officer or Department of Her Majesty's Government. The United States' ship of war may put a prize-crew on board the West India steamer, and carry her off to a port of the United States for adjudication by a Prize Court there; but she would have no right to move Messrs. Mason and Slidell, and carry them off as prisoners, leaving the ship to pursue her voyage.

On November 12, Palmerston advised Adams in person that the British nonetheless would take offense if the envoys were removed from a British ship. Palmerston emphasized that seizing the Confederates would be "highly inexpedient in every way Palmerston could view it" and a few more Confederates in Britain would not "produce any change in policy already adopted." Palmerston questioned the presence of Adger in British waters, and Adams assured Palmerston that he had read Marchand's orders (Marchand had visited Adams while in Great Britain) which limited him to seizing Mason and Slidell from a Confederate ship.

The news of the actual capture of Mason and Slidell did not arrive in London until November 27. Much of the public and many of the newspapers immediately perceived it as an outrageous insult to British honor, and a flagrant violation of maritime law. The London Chronicle's response was typical:

Mr. Seward … is exerting himself to provoke a quarrel with all Europe, in that spirit of senseless egotism which induces the Americans, with their dwarf fleet and shapeless mass of incoherent squads which they call an army, to fancy themselves the equal of France by land and Great Britain by sea.

The London Standard saw the capture as "but one of a series of premeditated blows aimed at this country … to involve it in a war with the Northern States". A letter from an American visitor written to Seward declared, "The people are frantic with rage, and were the country polled I fear 999 men out of 1,000 would declare for immediate war." Contrary to reports of overwhelming pro-Confederate sentiments amongst the British population, Karl Marx, exiled in London at that time, organized with and reported for British workers to publicly voice dissent against British coalition with the Confederacy:

Convinced that the germ of the future revolution lay in the North, Marx supported the bourgeois republic in its struggle against the slave oligarchy. In this respect he had the wholehearted aid of the British proletariat. When in the latter part of 1861, the reactionary Palmerston government attempted to use the Trent affair as a pretext for a war against the North, English workers held protest meetings in Brighton and elsewhere. These demonstrations were called in spite of the fact that the British ruling classes did everything in their power to make the workers believe that an alliance with the Confederacy would result in the breaking of the Northern blockade of Southern ports, which in turn, would mean the importation of greater quantities of cotton with consequent re-employment and prosperity. Yet, the British workers could not be so easily fooled; despite widespread misery and starvation, they showed their "indestructible excellence" by opposing the warmongers and by demanding peace. Their pro-Union demonstrations forced the Palmerston government to adopt a more conciliatory tone throughout the entire Trent affair. Marx, in reporting these meetings to his American readers, requested them never to forget that "at least the working classes of England" were on their side.(Enmale, 2003)

A member of Parliament stated that unless America set matters right the British flag should "be torn into shreds and sent to Washington for use of the Presidential water-closets". The seizure provoked one anti-Union meeting, held in Liverpool (later a hub of Confederate sympathy) and chaired by the future Confederate spokesman James Spence.

The Times published its first report from the United States on December 4, and its correspondent, W. H. Russell, wrote of American reactions, "There is so much violence of spirit among the lower orders of the people and they are … so saturated with pride and vanity that any honorable concession … would prove fatal to its authors." Times editor John T. Delane took a moderate stance and warned the people not to "regard the act in the worst light" and to question whether it made sense that the United States, despite British misgivings about Seward that went back to the earliest days of the Lincoln administration, would "force a quarrel upon the Powers of Europe". This restrained stance was common in Britain: "the press, as a whole, preached calm and praised it too, noting the general moderation of public temper it perceived".

The government got its first solid information on the Trent from Commander Williams who went directly to London after he arrived in England. He spent several hours with the Admiralty and the Prime Minister. Initial reaction among political leaders was firmly opposed to the American actions. Lord Clarendon, a former foreign secretary, expressed what many felt when he accused Seward of "trying to provoke us into a quarrel and finding that it could not be effected at Washington he was determined to compass it at sea".

Resisting Russell's call for an immediate cabinet meeting, Palmerston again called on the Law Officers to prepare a brief based on the actual events that had occurred, and an emergency cabinet meeting was scheduled two days later for Friday, November 29. Palmerston also informed the War Office that budget reductions scheduled for 1862 should be put on hold. Russell met briefly with Adams on November 29 to determine whether he could shed any light on American intent. Adams was unaware that Seward had already sent him a letter indicating Wilkes had acted without orders and was unable to provide Russell any information that might defuse the situation.

Palmerston, who believed he had received a verbal agreement from Adams that British vessels would not be interfered with, reportedly began the emergency cabinet meeting by throwing his hat on the table and declaring, "I don't know whether you are going to stand this, but I'll be damned if I do." The Law Officers' report was read and confirmed that Wilkes actions were:

illegal and unjustifiable by international law. The "San Jacinto" assumed to act as a belligerent, but the "Trent" was not captured or carried into a port of the United States for adjudication as a prize, and, under the circumstances, cannot be considered as having acted in breach of international law. It follows, that from on board a merchant-ship of a neutral Power, pursuing a lawful and innocent voyage, certain individuals have been taken by force... Her Majesty's Government will, therefore, in our opinion, be justified in requiring reparation for the international wrong which has been on this occasion committed

Dispatches from Lyons were given to all in attendance. These dispatches described the excitement in America in support of the capture, referred to previous dispatches in which Lyons had warned that Seward might provoke such an incident, and described the difficulty that the United States might have in acknowledging that Wilkes had erred. Lyons also recommended a show of force including sending reinforcements to Canada. Palmerston indicated to Lord Russell that it was very possible that the entire incident had been a "deliberate and premeditated insult" designed by Seward to "provoke" a confrontation with Britain.

After several days of discussion, on November 30 Russell sent to Queen Victoria the drafts of the dispatches intended for Lord Lyons to deliver to Seward. The Queen in turn asked her husband and consort, Prince Albert, to review the matter. Although ill with typhoid that would shortly take his life, Albert read through the dispatches, decided the ultimatum was too belligerent, and composed a softened version. In his November 30 response to Palmerston, Albert wrote:

The Queen … should have liked to have seen the expression of a hope [in the message to Seward] that the American captain did not act under instructions, or, if he did that he misapprehended them [and] that the United States government must be fully aware that the British Government could not allow its flag to be insulted, and the security of her mail communications to be placed in jeopardy, and [that] Her Majesty's Government are unwilling to believe that the United States Government intended wantonly to put an insult upon this country and to add to their many distressing complications by forcing a question of dispute upon us, and that we are therefore glad to believe … that they would spontaneously offer such redress as alone could satisfy this country, viz: the restoration of the unfortunate passengers and a suitable apology.

The cabinet incorporated in its official letter to Seward Albert's suggestions that would allow Washington to disavow both Wilkes' actions and any American intent to insult the British flag. The British still demanded an apology and the release of the Confederate emissaries. Lyons' private instructions directed him to give Seward seven days to reply and to close the British Legation in Washington and return home if a satisfactory response was not forthcoming. In a further effort to defuse the situation, Russell added his own private note telling Lyons to meet with Seward and advise him of the contents of the official letter before it was actually delivered. Lyons was told that as long as the commissioners were released, the British would "be rather easy about the apology" and that an explanation sent through Adams would probably be satisfactory. He reiterated that the British would fight if necessary, and suggested that the "best thing would be if Seward could be turned out and a rational man put in his place." The dispatches were shipped on December 1 via the Europa, reaching Washington on December 18. Albert's response would prove critical in defusing not just a third war between Britain and America but a British military intervention on behalf of the Confederacy and ensure the Lincoln administration had a way to solve the crisis by accepting British demands without losing face among the Northern public or outright rejecting these demands.

=== Diplomacy on hold ===
While military preparations were accelerated, diplomacy would be on hold for the rest of the month while Britain waited for the American response. There had been unrest in the British financial markets since the news of the Trent was first received. Consols, which had initially declined in value in the early part of the month, fell by another 2 percent, reaching the level during the first year of the Crimean War. Other securities fell another 4 to 5 percent. Railway stocks and colonial and foreign securities declined. The Times noted that the financial markets were reacting as if war were a certainty.

In the early deliberations over the appropriate British response to the capture of the envoys, there was concern that Napoleon III would take advantage of a Union-British war to act against British interests in "Europe or elsewhere". French and British interests clashed in Indochina, in building the Suez Canal, in Italy, and in Mexico. Palmerston saw French stockpiling of coal in the West Indies as indicating France was preparing for war with Britain. The French Navy remained smaller, but had otherwise shown itself equal to the Royal Navy in the Crimean War. A possible buildup of ironclads by the French would present a clear threat in the English Channel.

France quickly alleviated many of Britain's concerns. On November 28, with no knowledge of the British response or any input from Mercier in the U.S., Napoleon met with his cabinet. They had no doubts about the illegality of the U.S. actions and agreed to support whatever demands Britain made. Thouvenel wrote to Count Charles de Flahault in London to inform Britain of their decision. After learning of the actual content of the British note, Thouvenel advised the British ambassador Lord Cowley, that the demand had his complete approval, and on December 4 instructions were sent to Mercier to support Lyons.

A minor stir occurred when General Winfield Scott, until recently the commander of all Union troops, and Thurlow Weed, a known confidant of Seward, arrived in Paris. Their mission, to counter Confederate propaganda efforts with propaganda efforts of their own, had been determined before the Trent affair, but the timing was considered odd by Cowley. Rumors circulated that Scott was blaming the whole incident on Seward who had somehow manipulated Lincoln into acquiescing with the seizure. Scott put the rumors to rest with a December 4 letter that was published in the Paris Constitutional and reprinted throughout Europe, including most London papers. Denying the rumors, Scott stated that "every instinct of prudence as well as of good neighborhood prompts our government to regard no honorable sacrifice too great for the preservation of the friendship of Great Britain."

The benign intentions of the United States were also argued by John Bright and Richard Cobden, strong supporters of the United States and leaders of the Anti-Corn Law League in Britain. Both had expressed strong reservations about the legality of American actions, but argued strongly that the United States had no aggressive designs against Great Britain. Bright publicly disputed that the confrontation had been intentionally engineered by Washington. In an early December speech to his constituents, he condemned the British military preparations "before we have made a representation to the American Government, before we have heard a word from it in reply, [we] should be all up in arms, every sword leaping from its scabbard and every man looking about for his pistols and blunderbusses?" Cobden joined with Bright by speaking at public meetings and by writing letters to newspapers, organizers of meetings that he could not attend, and influential people in and out of Britain. As time passed and voices opposing war were heard more and more, the Cabinet also began considering alternatives to war, including arbitration.

=== Military preparations (December 1860 – December 1861) ===
Even before the Civil War erupted, Britain, with her worldwide interests, needed to have a military policy regarding the divided United States. In 1860 Rear Admiral Sir Alexander Milne took command of the North America and West Indies station of the Royal Navy. On December 22, 1860, with secession still in its early stages, Milne's orders were to avoid "any measure or demonstration likely to give umbrage to any party in the United States, or to bear the appearance of partizanship [sic] on either side; if the internal dissensions in those States should be carried to the extent of separation". Until May 1861, in compliance with these instructions and as part of a long-standing policy of the Royal Navy to avoid ports where desertion was likely, Milne avoided the American coast. In May the Neutrality Proclamation of May 13 was issued. This increased British concern over the threat of Confederate privateers and Union blockading ships to British neutral rights, and Milne was reinforced. On June 1 British ports were closed to any naval prizes, a policy that was of great advantage to the Union. Milne did monitor the effectiveness of the Union blockade, but no effort to contest its effectiveness was ever attempted, and the monitoring was discontinued in November 1861.

Milne received a letter from Lyons on June 14 that said he did not "regard a sudden declaration of war against us by the United States as an event altogether impossible at any moment". Milne warned his scattered forces, and in a June 27 letter to the Admiralty asked for further reinforcements and deplored the weakness of the defenses in the West Indies. Referring to Jamaica, Milne reported conditions that included, "works badly contrived and worse executed—unserviceable guns—decayed gun cartridges—corroded shot—the absence of stores of all kinds and of ammunition, with dilapidated and damp powder magazines". Milne made it clear that his existing forces were totally absorbed simply in protecting commerce and defending possessions, many inadequately. He had only a single ship available "for any special service that may be suddenly required".

The Duke of Somerset, the First Lord of the Admiralty, opposed Palmerston's inclination to reinforce Milne. He felt that the existing force made up largely of steam ships was superior to the primarily sail ships of the Union fleet, and he was reluctant to incur additional expenses while Britain was in the process of rebuilding her fleet with iron ships. This resistance by Parliament and the cabinet led historian Kenneth Bourne to conclude, "When, therefore the news of the Trent outrage arrived in England the British were still not properly prepared for the war which almost everyone agreed was inevitable if the Union did not back down."

==== Land forces ====
On the land, at the end of March 1861, Britain had 2,100 regular troops in Nova Scotia, 2,200 in the rest of Canada, and scattered posts in British Columbia, Bermuda, and the West Indies. Lieutenant General Sir William Fenwick Williams, Commander in Chief, North America, did what he could with his small forces, but he wrote repeatedly to the authorities back in Britain that he needed considerable reinforcements to prepare his defenses adequately.

Some land reinforcements were sent in May and June. When Palmerston, alarmed by the blockade and the Trent affair, pressed for increasing the number of regular troops in Canada to 10,000, he met resistance. Sir George Cornwall Lewis, head of the War Office, questioned whether there was any real threat to Great Britain. He judged it "incredible that any Government of ordinary prudence should at a moment of civil war gratuitously increase the number of its enemies, and, moreover, incur the hostility of so formidable a power as England". In the debate in Parliament on June 21 there was general opposition to reinforcements, based on political, military, and economic arguments. A long standing issue was the attempt by Parliament to shift more of the burden of Canadian defense to the local government. Colonial secretary Newcastle felt that the requests by Williams were part of a pattern of the "last few years" in which he had "been very fertile of demands and suggestions". Newcastle was also concerned that there were no winter quarters available for additional troops and he feared desertions would be a serious problem.

From the beginning of the Trent crisis, British leaders were aware that a viable military option was an essential part of defending the nation's interests. The First Lord of the Admiralty believed Canada could not be defended from a serious attack by the U.S. and winning it back later would be difficult and costly. Bourne noted, "After 1815 the ambiguity of Anglo-American relations, the parsimony of the house of commons [sic] and the enormous practical difficulties involved always seemed to have prevented adequate preparations being made for an Anglo-American war." Somerset suggested a naval war as opposed to a ground war.

Military preparation began quickly after news of the Trent reached Great Britain. Secretary of War Sir George Lewis proposed within a week to send "thirty thousand rifles, an artillery battery, and some officers to Canada". He wrote to Lord Palmerston on December 3, "I propose to engage a Cunard Steamer & send out one regiment & one battery of artillery next week" followed as quickly as possible by three more regiments and more artillery. Given the realities of the North Atlantic in winter, the reinforcements would have to land in Nova Scotia, since the Saint Lawrence River begins to ice up in December.

Russell was concerned that Lewis and Palmerston might take actions prematurely that would eliminate what chances for peace that there were, so he requested "a small committee …[to] assist Lewis, & the Duke of Somerset" with their war plans. The group was created and convened on December 9. The group consisted of Palmerston, Lewis, Somerset, Russell, Newcastle, Lord Granville (foreign secretary) and the Duke of Cambridge (commander-in-chief of the British Army), advised by Earl de Grey (Lewis' undersecretary), Lord Seaton (a former commander-in-chief in Canada), General John Fox Burgoyne (the inspector general of fortifications) and Colonel Patrick Leonard MacDougall (the former commander of the Royal Canadian Rifles). The first priority of the committee was Canadian defense, and the committee relied on both plans developed by previous explorations of the issue and information that the committee developed on its own from the testimony of experts.

The current resources in Canada consisted of five thousand regular troops and about an equal number of "ill-trained" militia of which only one-fifth were organized. During December the British managed to send 11,000 troops using 18 transport ships and by the end of the month they were prepared to send an additional 28,400 men. By the end of December, as the crisis ended, reinforcements had raised the count to 924 officers and 17,658 men against an anticipated American invasion of from 50,000 to 200,000 troops. Including the units sent overland and the British forces already in the Province of Canada, British field forces in the province would have amounted to nine infantry battalions and four field artillery batteries by mid-March, 1862, a force equivalent to three brigades (i.e., one division), with four infantry battalions and two field artillery batteries (the equivalent of two more brigades) split between New Brunswick and Nova Scotia. There were also 12 batteries of garrison artillery – six in the Province of Canada, three in Nova Scotia, two in New Brunswick and one in Newfoundland—and three companies of engineers in Canada, plus various headquarters, service, and support elements including two battalions of the Military Train

Five infantry battalions, three field artillery batteries, and six garrison artillery batteries moved by sea from Halifax, Nova Scotia, to Saint John, New Brunswick, then overland by sleigh from Saint John to Riviere du Loup, Province of Canada, between January 1 and March 13, 1862. The 10-day-long overland passage, and the railway from Riviere du Loup to Ville du Quebec, was within a day's march of the border (in some locations, the overland trail was almost within rifle shot from U.S. territory in Maine), so the British staff planned on deploying infantry to defend the road, if necessary. The 96th Regiment, travelling on the Calcutta, reached New Brunswick in February; the other half were forced to abandon their voyage in the Azores when their ship, the Victoria, nearly sank. The Headquarters staff, who landed in Halifax on 5 January 1862 after the crisis was over, decided to take a quicker route to Montreal and, covering up their military baggage labels to disguise their identities, took a Cunard steamer to Boston from where they caught the railway to Montreal.

In Canada, General Williams had toured the available forts and fortifications in November and December. Historian Gordon Warren wrote that Williams found that, "forts were either decaying or nonexistent, and the amount of necessary remedial work was stupefying." To defend Canada, the British government estimated their manpower requirements as 10,000 regulars and 100,000 auxiliary troops, the latter forming garrisons and harassing the enemy's flanks and rear. Canada offered two potential sources of such auxiliary troops: the Sedentary Militia, which consisted of all Canadian males between ages 16 and 60, and volunteer organisations similar to the British rifle volunteers. Bourne summed up these two forces as follows:

In spite of its proud record—or perhaps because of it—the Canadian militia had been allowed to decline into a mere paper force. By law the entire male population between eighteen and sixty was liable for service but the vast majority of these, the sedentary militia, had no existence beyond enrolment. The only active force, the volunteers, received a mere six or twelve days' annual training according to the arm of the service, and of the 5,000 authorized there were only some 4,422 in June 1861 – a "miserable small force! And many of them but ill-trained, unless greatly improved since last year", was Newcastle's comment.

Williams' task of raising, arming, and disciplining this army was not dissimilar to the one the Union and Confederates had faced at the beginning of the Civil War, a year earlier. In the Province of Canada there were 25,000 arms, 10,000 of them smoothbores, and in the Maritimes there were 13,000 rifles and 7,500 smoothbores: though weapons were readily available in England, the difficulty was in transporting them to Canada. 30,000 Enfield rifles were sent on December 6 with the Melbourne, and by February 10, 1862, the Times reported that modern arms and equipment for 105,550 had arrived in Canada along with 20 million cartridges.

On December 2, at Williams' urging, the Canadian government agreed to raise its active volunteer force to 7,500. The risk of war pushed the number of volunteers to 13,390 by May 1862, although the number of "efficient" volunteers was only 11,940. On December 20, Williams also began training one company of 75 men from each battalion of the Sedentary Militia, about 38,000 men in total, with the intention of raising this to 100,000. Warren describes the Sedentary militia on their initial muster, before arms and equipment were served out to them:

Untrained and undisciplined, they showed up in all manner of dress, with belts of basswood bark and sprigs of green balsam in their hats, carrying an assortment of flintlocks, shotguns, rifles, and scythes. Their officers, prefacing orders with "please", recoiled in horror as formations of the backwoodsmen zigzagged on command to wheel to the left.

By the summer of 1862, long after the crisis had subsided, the available Canadian volunteers numbered 16,000; 10,615 infantry; 1,615 cavalry; 1,687 artillery; 202 volunteer engineers besides new corps not yet accepted into service and the militia. Militia returns for 1862 show 470,000 militiamen in Canada, but with the volunteers it was not expected to raise more than 100,000 Canadian troops for active service. It was within the context of a generally unprepared Canadian military that military ground plans were formulated—plans contingent on troops that would not be available until spring 1862. Canada was not prepared for war with the United States. In the War Cabinet there had been disagreement between MacDougall, who believed that the Union would suspend the war and turn its full attention to Canada, and Burgoyne, who believed the war would continue. Both agreed that Canada would face a major ground assault from the United States—an assault that both recognized would be difficult to oppose. The defense depended on "an extensive system of fortifications" and "seizing command of the lakes". While Burgoyne stressed the natural tactical advantages of fighting on the defense out of strong fortifications, the fact was that the fortification plans previously made had never been executed. On the Great Lakes, both Canada and the United States had no naval assets to speak of in November. The British would be vulnerable here at least until the spring of 1862.

==== Invasion plans ====
In order to counter their weaknesses to an American offensive, the idea of a British invasion of the United States from Canada was proposed. It was hoped that a successful invasion would occupy large sections of Maine, including Portland. The British believed that this would require the U.S. to divert troops that would otherwise be occupied with an invasion of Canada directed at its east-west communication and transportation lines. Burgoyne, Seaton, and MacDougall all supported the plan and Lewis recommended it to Palmerston on December 3. No preparations for this attack were ever made, and success depended on the attack being initiated at the very beginning of the war. MacDougall believed that "a strong party is believed to exist in Maine in favor of annexation to Canada" (a belief that Bourne characterizes as "dubious"), and that this party would assist a British invasion. The Admiralty hydrographer, Captain Washington, and Milne both felt that if such a party existed that it would be best to postpone an attack and wait until it became apparent that "the state was inclined to change masters."

On December 28, 1861, Governor of the Colony of British Columbia James Douglas wrote to Secretary of State for the Colonies Henry Pelham-Clinton, 5th Duke of Newcastle, arguing that Britain should have the opportunity to take parts of the U.S.-held Pacific Northwest while America was preoccupied with the Civil War. He lay out his reasoning in the letter regarding the military strength of both nations in the region:

1. The [British] Naval Force at present here, consists of Her Majesty's steam Frigate "Topaze", Captain The Honble J.W.S. Spencer; the "Hecate" Surveying Ship with the "Forward" and "Grappler" Gun Boats. With the exception of the Forward, whose boilers are worn out and unserviceable, these Ships are all in a thoroughly efficient state.
2. Our Military Force consists of the Detachment of Royal Engineers stationed in British Columbia, and the Royal Marine Infantry occupying the disputed Island of San Juan; forming in all about 200 rank and file.
3. The United States have absolutely no Naval Force in these waters, beyond one or two small Revenue Vessels; and with the exception of one Company of Artillery,

I am informed that all [U.S.] regular Troops have been withdrawn from Oregon and Washington Territory; but it must nevertheless be evident that the small Military Force we possess, if acting solely on the defensive, could not protect our Extensive frontier even against the Militia or Volunteer Corps that may be let loose upon the British Possessions.

1. In such circumstances, I conceive that our only chance of success will be found in assuming the offensive and taking possession of Puget Sound with Her Majesty's Ships, re-inforced by such bodies of local auxiliaries as can, in the Emergency, be raised, whenever hostilities are actually declared, and by that means effectually preventing the departure of any hostile armament against the British Colonies, and at one blow cutting off the Enemy's supplies by sea, destroying his foreign trade, and entirely crippling his resources, before any organization of the inhabitants into military bodies can have effect. There is little real difficulty in that operation, as the Coast is entirely unprovided with defensive works, and the Fleet may occupy Puget Sound without molestation.
2. The small number of regular Troops disposable for such service would necessarily confine our operations to the line of coast: but should Her Majesty's Government decide, as lately mooted, on sending out one or two Regiments of Queen's Troops, there is no reason why we should not push overland from Puget Sound and establish advanced posts on the Columbia River, maintaining it as a permanent frontier.
3. A Small Naval Force entering the Columbia River at the same time would secure possession, and render the occupation complete. There is not much to fear from the Scattered population of Settlers, as they would be but too glad to remain quiet and follow their peaceful avocations under any government capable of protecting them from the savages.
4. With Puget Sound and the line of the Columbia River in our hands, we should hold the only navigable outlets of the Country, command its trade and soon compel it to submit to Her Majesty's Rule.

==== Naval forces ====
It was at sea that the British had their greatest strength and their greatest ability to bring the war to the United States if necessary. The Admiralty, on December 1, wrote to Russell that Milne "should give his particular attention to the measures that may be necessary for the protection of the valuable trade between America, the West Indies, and England". Somerset issued provisional orders to British naval units around the world to be prepared to attack American shipping wherever it might be found. The Cabinet was also agreed that establishing and maintaining a tight blockade was essential to British success.

In 1864 Milne wrote that his own plan was:

… to have secured our own bases, especially Bermuda and Halifax, raised the blockade of the Southern Ports by means of the squadron then at Mexico under the orders of Commodore Dunlop and that I had with me at Bermuda and then to have immediately blockaded as effectually as my means admitted the chief Northern Ports, and to have acted in Chesapeake Bay in co-operation with the Southern Forces …

Regarding possible joint operations with the Confederacy, Somerset wrote to Milne on December 15:

…generally it will be well to avoid as much as possible any combined operations on a great scale (except as far as the fleet may be concerned), under any specious project such as for an attack on Washington or Baltimore; — experience proves almost invariably the great evils of combined operations by armies of different countries; and in this case, the advantage of the enemy of the defensive station will far more than compensate for the union of forces against it.

Somerset was opposed to attacking heavily fortified positions and Milne concurred:

The object of the war can of course only be considered to cripple the enemy. That is his trade and of his trade it can only be his shipping. No object would be gained if the Forts alone are to be attacked, as modern views deprecate any damage to a town. If ships are fired upon in a Port the town must suffer; therefore the shipping cannot be fired on. This actually reserves operations to against vessels at sea. If a town is undefended or the defenses subdued an embargo might be put on it and a subsidy demanded.

The British strongly believed that they had naval superiority over the Union. Although Union ships outnumbered Milne's available force, many of the United States fleet were simply remodeled merchant ships, and the British had an advantage in the number of total guns and high-quality ships available. Bourne suggested that this advantage could change during the war as both sides turned more to ironclads. In particular, British ironclads had a deeper draught and could not operate in American coastal waters, leaving a close blockade dependent on wooden ships vulnerable to Union ironclads.

Of course, the military option was not needed. If it had been, Warren concluded that, "Britain's world dominance of the seventeenth and eighteenth centuries had vanished; the Royal Navy, although more powerful than ever, no longer ruled the waves." Military historian Russell Weigley concurs in Warren's analysis and adds:

The Royal Navy retained the appearance of maritime supremacy principally because it existed in a naval vacuum, with no serious rivals except for halfhearted and sporadic challenges by the French. At that, the British Navy would have had a difficult time making itself felt on the North American coast. The coming of steam power had destroyed the ability of its best warships to cruise indefinitely in American waters as the blockading squadrons had done in 1812. Even with a major base at Halifax, or possible aid from Confederate ports, the British Navy would have found it a precarious venture to try to keep station on the U.S. Coast. No steam navy operated with success against any reasonably formidable enemy at the distances from its home ports that a trans-Atlantic war would have imposed on the British fleet until the U.S. Navy fought the Japanese in World War II.

Some contemporaries were less sanguine about the U.S. Navy's prospects in a war with Britain. On 5 July 1861, Lieutenant David Dixon Porter wrote to his old friend, Assistant Secretary of the Navy Gustavus Fox:

I went on board a small English screw sloop the other day (the Jason (1859)) and with her one Armstrong gun (which some folks say is a failure, but I say is not), she would whip the largest ship in the Navy out of her boots, or more properly speaking her pumps, as ships don't wear boots. The point-blank range of this Armstrong gun is 1 ½ miles which settles the question for none of our guns will more than reach that with the greatest elevation.

In February 1862, the Duke of Cambridge, the British Army's commander-in-chief, gave his analysis of British military reaction to the Trent affair:

I do not at all regret the demonstration, though we are not as it appears to have war. It will be a valuable lesson to the Americans, and to the World at large, and will so prove to all what England can and will do, when the necessity for so doing arises. It also established the fact that we are not that insignificant military Power, which some people are disposed to make out, and that the military organization of our departments is now such, that at any moment we can be, and are prepared should it arise. It also proves that we have an able staff to conduct the details of a difficult operation.

== Resolution (November 1861 – January 1862) ==
The British government prepared an ultimatum and readied a military response. The ultimatum was then presented to Queen Victoria's husband Prince Albert of Saxe-Coburg and Gotha, who was gravely ill but intervened to defuse the crisis. In a few hours, he revised the British demands in a manner that allowed the Lincoln administration to surrender the Confederate commissioners who had been seized from the Trent and to issue a public apology to London without losing face. The key idea, based on a suggestion from The Times, was to give Washington the opportunity to deny that it had officially authorised Captain Wilkes to seize the RMS Trent and thereby to apologise for the mistake. By December 17, Adams received Seward's November 30 dispatch stating that Wilkes acted without orders, and Adams immediately told Russell. Russell was encouraged by the news, but deferred any action until a formal response to the British communication was received. The note was not released to the public, but rumors were published by the press of the Union's intent. Russell refused to confirm the information, and John Bright later asked in Parliament, "How came it that this dispatch was never published for the information of the people of this country?"

In Washington, Lyons received the official British response and his instructions on December 18. As instructed, Lyons met with Seward on December 19 and described the contents of the British response without actually delivering them. Seward was told that the British would expect a formal reply within seven days of Seward's receipt of the official communication. At Seward's request, Lyons gave him an unofficial copy of the British response which Seward immediately shared with Lincoln. On Saturday December 21 Lyons visited Seward to deliver the "British ultimatum", but after further discussion they agreed that the formal delivery would be postponed for another two days. Lyons and Seward reached an agreement that the seven-day deadline should not be considered as part of the official communication from the British government.

Senator Charles Sumner, Chairman of the Senate Foreign Relations Committee and a frequent consultant to President Lincoln on foreign relations, had recognized immediately that the United States must release Mason and Slidell, but he had remained publicly silent during the weeks of high excitement. Sumner had traveled in England and carried on regular correspondence with many political activists in Britain. In December, he received particularly alarming letters from Richard Cobden and John Bright. Bright and Cobden discussed the preparations of the government for war and the widespread doubts, including their own, of the legality of Wilkes' actions. The Duchess of Argyll, a strong antislavery advocate in Great Britain, wrote Sumner that the capture of the envoys was "the maddest act that ever was done, and, unless the [United States] government intend to force us to war, utterly inconceivable."

Sumner took these letters to Lincoln, who had just learned of the official British demand. Sumner and Lincoln met daily over the next week and discussed the ramifications of a war with Great Britain. In a December 24 letter Sumner wrote that the concerns were over the British fleet breaking the blockade and establishing their own blockade, French recognition of the Confederacy and movement into Mexico and Latin America, and the postwar (assuming Confederate independence) widespread smuggling of British manufactures via the South that would cripple American manufacturing. Lincoln thought that he could meet directly with Lyons and "show him in five minutes that I am heartily for peace", but Sumner persuaded him of the diplomatic impropriety of such a meeting. Both men ended up agreeing that arbitration might be the best solution, and Sumner was invited to attend a cabinet meeting scheduled for Christmas morning.

Relevant information from Europe flowed to Washington right up to the time of the cabinet meeting. On December 25 a letter written on December 6 by Adams was received in Washington. Adams wrote:

The passions of the country are up and a collision is inevitable if the Government of the United States should, before the news reaches the other side, have assumed the position of Captain Wilkes in a manner to preclude the possibility of explanation. … Ministers and people now fully believe it is the intention of the [U.S.] Government to drive them into hostilities.

Two messages from American consuls in Great Britain were also received at the same time. From Manchester the news was that Britain was arming "with the greatest energy" and from London the message was that a "strong fleet" was being built with work going on around the clock, seven days a week. Thurlow Weed, who had moved from Paris to London to ensure that General Scott's letter was circulated, also sent a letter advising Seward that "such prompt and gigantic preparations were never known."

The disruption of trade threatened the Union war effort as well as British prosperity. British India was the only source of the saltpeter used in Union gunpowder. Within hours of learning of the Trent Affair Russell moved to halt the export of saltpeter and two days later the Cabinet banned the export of arms, ammunition, military stores and lead. Britain was one of the few sources of weapons designated "first class" by the Union army, and between 1 May 1861 and 31 December 1862 it supplied more than 341,000 rifles and 49,982,000 percussion caps to the Union. One historian concluded of the Union's source of weapons that "The domestic market, which consisted of few sporting arms and a few hastily manufactured and often inferior rifles and muskets, was soon exhausted… Foreign arms became the major source of supply in the first year and a half of the war… British and European arms allowed the Union army to take the field early in the war."

The wider U.S. economy was soon hit by the effects of the Trent crisis. On December 16, the actions of the British cabinet reached New York: the stock exchange fell across the board, with government securities dropping by 2.5 per cent and the sterling exchange rising by two points, and an overall suspension seemed imminent. On December 20, Salmon P. Chase's broker refused to sell some of the secretary's holdings of railway stock because they were almost worthless, and informed him that the business community "trust you will have allayed this excitement with England: one war at a time is enough". A run on New York banks followed the stock market troubles, with $17,000,000 being withdrawn in three weeks, and on December 30 the banks voted by 25–15 to suspend specie payments. Banks across the country soon followed them, with only those of Ohio, Indiana, and Kentucky continuing to redeem in coin. This suspension left the Treasury unable to pay its suppliers, contractors or soldiers. Though the crisis was resolved soon afterwards, these difficulties were not: on January 10, Lincoln asked Quartermaster General Meigs "General, what shall I do? The people are impatient; Chase has no money, and he tells me he can raise no more; the General of the Armies has typhoid fever. The bottom is out of the tub. What shall I do?" The Treasury was eventually forced to issue fiat money in the form of "greenbacks" to meet its obligations.

With all of the negative news, the official response from France also arrived. Dayton had already told Seward of his own meeting with Thouvenel, in which the French foreign minister had told him that Wilkes' actions were "a clear breach of international law" but that France would "remain a spectator in any war between the United States and England". A direct message was received on Christmas Day from Thouvenel (it was actually delivered during the cabinet meeting) urging that the United States release the prisoners and in so doing affirm the rights of neutrals on the seas that France and the United States had repeatedly argued against Great Britain.

Seward had prepared a draft of his intended response to the British prior to the cabinet meeting and he was the only one present who had a detailed, organized position to present. His main point in the debate was that releasing the prisoners was consistent with the traditional American position on the right of neutrals, and the public would accept it as such. Both Chase and Attorney General Edward Bates were strongly influenced by the various messages from Europe, and Postmaster Montgomery Blair had been in favor of releasing the captives even before the meeting. Lincoln clung to arbitration but received no support, the primary objection being the time that would be involved and an impatient Britain. No decision was made at the meeting and a new meeting was scheduled for the next day. Lincoln indicated he wished to prepare his own paper for this meeting. The next day Seward's proposal to release the prisoners was accepted without dissent. Lincoln did not submit a counter argument, indicating afterwards to Seward that he had found he was unable to draft a convincing rebuttal to Seward's position.

Seward's reply was "a long, highly political document". Seward stated that Wilkes had acted on his own and denied allegations by the British that the seizure itself had been conducted in a discourteous and violent manner. The capture and search of Trent was consistent with international law, and Wilkes' only error was in failing to take Trent to a port for judicial determination. The release of the prisoners was therefore required in order "to do to the British nation just what we have always insisted all nations ought to do to us". Seward's reply, in effect, accepted Wilkes' treatment of the prisoners as contraband and also equated their capture with the British exercise of impressment of British citizens off of neutral ships. This response contradicted itself in a number of ways. Citing the precedent of impressment implied that Mason and Slidell had been removed for their status as American nationals, rather than as contraband; it was a reversal of America's previous position on the topic, referred to a right the British had not exercised for half a century, and—as Mason and Slidell were taken prisoner rather than being conscripted into the navy—was irrelevant to the case. More fundamentally, Seward's stance assumed that a state of war was in effect: otherwise, Federal warships would have had no legal status as belligerents with the right of search. At the time of the Trent Affair, the North was not only refusing to acknowledge a state of war, but was still demanding that the British government withdraw its recognition of Confederate belligerency in the form of the Proclamation of Neutrality.

Lyons was summoned to Seward's office on December 27 and presented with the response. Focusing on the release of the prisoners rather than Seward's stated analysis of the situation, Lyons forwarded the message and decided to remain in Washington until further instructions were received. The news of the release was published by December 29 and the public response was generally positive. Among those opposed to the decision was Wilkes who characterized it "as a craven yielding and an abandonment of all the good … done by [their] capture". Such was the sense of urgency in Britain to learn of the outcome that special trains carried the news from its landfall in Wales to London, breaking speed records on the way.

Mason and Slidell were released from Fort Warren and boarded the Royal Navy screw sloop HMS Rinaldo at Provincetown, Massachusetts. The Rinaldo took them to St. Thomas; on January 14, they left on the British mail packet La Plata bound for Southampton. The news of their release reached Britain on January 8. The British accepted the news as a diplomatic victory. Palmerston noted that Seward's response contained "many doctrines of international law" contrary to the British interpretation, and Russell wrote a detailed response to Seward contesting his legal interpretations, but, by this time, the crisis was over.

== Aftermath ==
Historian Charles Hubbard describes the Confederate perspective to the resolution of the crisis:

The resolution of the Trent affair dealt a serious blow to Confederate diplomatic efforts. First, it deflected the recognition momentum developed during the summer and fall of 1861. It created a feeling in Great Britain that the United States was prepared to defend itself when necessary, but recognized its responsibility to comply with international law. Moreover, it produced a feeling in Great Britain and France that peace could be preserved as long as the Europeans maintained strict neutrality in regard to the American belligerents.

The issue of diplomatic recognition of the Confederacy remained alive. It was considered further throughout 1862 by the British and French governments within the context of formally extending an offer, difficult to refuse, for mediation of the war. As the war in America intensified and the bloody results of the Battle of Shiloh became known, the humanitarian reasons for European intervention seemed to have more merit. The Emancipation Proclamation announced in September 1862 made it clear that the issue of slavery was now at the forefront of the war. At first the British reaction to the Battle of Antietam and the preliminary announcement of the Emancipation Proclamation was that this would only create a slave rebellion within the South as the war itself became progressively more violent. Only in November 1862 did the momentum for European intervention reverse course.

Historians have given special credit to Seward and Lincoln for their handling of the crisis. Seward always favored handing back the captives. Lincoln, realizing the disaster that war would bring, also had to deal with an angry public opinion. James G. Randall argues that Lincoln's contribution was decisive, as it lay:

in his restraint, his avoidance of any outward expression of truculence, his early softening of State Department's attitude toward Britain, his deference toward Seward and Sumner, his withholding of his own paper prepared for the occasion, his readiness to arbitrate, his golden silence in addressing Congress, his shrewdness in recognizing that war must be averted, and his clear perception that a point could be clinched for America's true position at the same time that full satisfaction was given to a friendly country.

== See also ==
- Diplomacy of the American Civil War
- United Kingdom and the American Civil War
- Christie Question
- Tangier Difficulty
