= Antônio Coelho de Sá e Albuquerque =

Brazilian politician

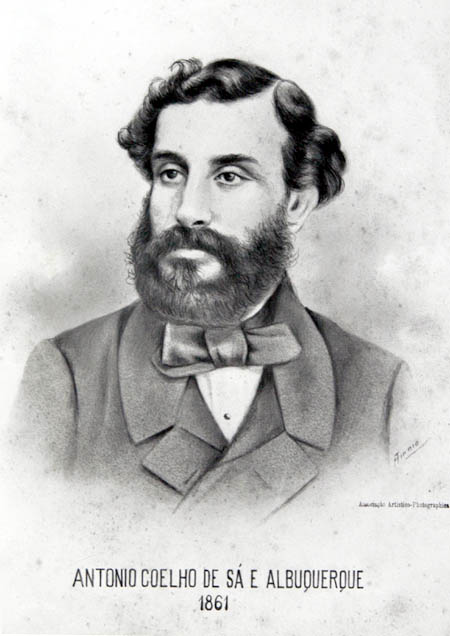

Governor of Bahia
- In office May 5, 1862 – April 23, 1864
- Monarch: Pedro II
- Prime Minister: Marquis of Olinda
- Preceded by: Joaquim Fernandes Leão
- Succeeded by: Antônio da Silva Gomes

Governor of Alagoas
- In office October 14, 1854 – May 4, 1855
- Prime Minister: Marquis of Paraná
- Preceded by: Roberto Calheiros
- Succeeded by: Roberto Calheiros
- In office November 7, 1855 – March 5, 1856
- Preceded by: Roberto Calheiros
- Succeeded by: Unknown
- In office October 24, 1856 – April 13, 1857
- Preceded by: Unknown
- Succeeded by: Inácio Mendonça

Governor of Pará
- In office October 23, 1859 – May 12, 1860
- Prime Minister: Baron of Uruguaiana
- Preceded by: Manuel de Frias e Vasconcelos
- Succeeded by: Antônio da Silva Gomes

Personal details
- Born: October 18, 1821 Muribeca, Sergipe, Brazil, United Kingdom of Portugal, Brazil and the Algarves
- Died: February 22, 1868 (aged 46) Off the coast of Bahia, Brazil
- Party: Brazilian Liberal Party

Military service
- Allegiance: Empire of Brazil
- Branch: Imperial Brazilian Army

Antônio Coelho de Sá e Albuquerque was a Brazilian landowner, lawyer and politician who was notable for being one of the main figures of the Christie Question as well as the governor of several Brazilian states.

== Biography ==
Antônio Coelho de Sá e Albuquerque was born in Muribeca, Sergipe, on October 18, 1821, the son of Commander Lourenço de Sá e Albuquerque and Mariana de Sá e Albuquerque. He was the brother of Lourenço de Sá e Albuquerque, Viscount of Guararapes. His family was one of the main ones in Pernambuco and were owners of several sugar mills.

Coelho was a graduate of the Recife Law School and an important landowner as he began leaning towards a political career. He was a national deputy for Pernambuco in the Legislative Assemblies of the periods 1853-1856, 1857-1860, 1861-1862 and 1864-1865 and a national senator representing Pernambuco from May 13, 1865 to February 22, 1868.

He was president of the province of the State of Paraíba from July 3, 1851 to April 29, 1853 and introduced a mandate during which he implemented the use of the plow. Shortly after taking office, in August 1851, he presented an extensive and detailed plan of public works. The difficulties encountered in its execution led to extensive reforms in the construction system in the province.

He was president of Alagoas on three occasions: from October 13 to May 4, 1855, from October 29, 1855 to May 11, 1856, and from October 24, 1856 to April 13, 1857 . During his tenures he had the chapel of the Nossa Senhora da Piedade cemetery built and a lazaretto for people with cholera.

He presided over the province of Pará from October 23, 1859 to May 12, 1860 .

He was Minister of Foreign Affairs of the conservative cabinet headed by Luís Alves de Lima e Silva, Duke of Caxias, from April 21 to July 9, 1861 when he was replaced by Benevenuto Augusto Magalhães Taques.

He was Minister of Agriculture in the brief cabinet of the liberal Zacarias de Góis e Vasconcelos between May 24 and 29, 1862 .

He ruled Bahia from September 30, 1862 to December 15, 1863.

Once the War of the Triple Alliance had begun, he was Minister of Foreign Affairs of the liberal cabinet headed by Zacarias de Góis between October 27, 1866 and December 8, 1867 . By decrees of December 7, 1866 and July 31, 1867, the Amazon River and its tributaries, the Negro, Madeira and São Francisco rivers, were opened to free international navigation. During this period all the efforts of the government were destined to sustain the war with Paraguay.

Coelho died on 22 February 1868 aboard the steam Paraná off the coast of Bahia.
