= RMS Trent =

British merchant ship

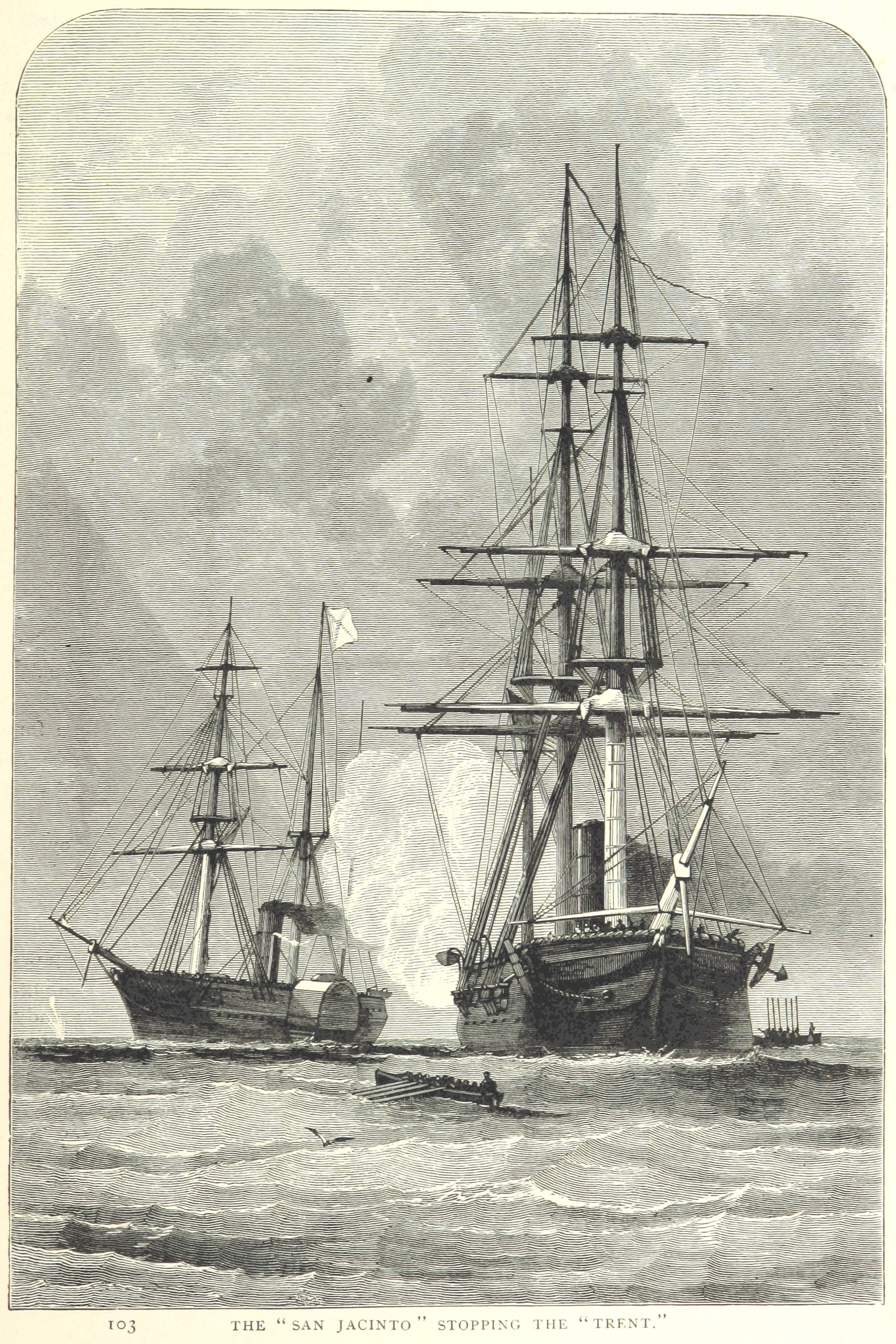
- The Trent (left) is stopped by the San Jacinto

History

United Kingdom
- Name: RMS Trent
- Owner: Royal Mail Steam Packet Company
- Builder: William Pitcher, Northfleet
- Launched: 1841
- Fate: Sold and broken up after 1865

General characteristics
- Type: Paddle steamer
- Tonnage: 1,856 GRT

RMS Trent was a British Royal Mail paddle steamer built in 1841 by William Pitcher of Northfleet for the Royal Mail Steam Packet Company. She measured 1,856 gross tons and could carry 60 passengers. She was one of four ships constructed at Blackwall, all named after some of the principal rivers of England. The others were the Thames, Medway and Isis.

Commander Edward C. Miller R.N. was appointed to take out the mails from Southampton on 1 March 1842.

Trent served the transatlantic passenger route until she was requisitioned by the British government on the outbreak of the Crimean War in 1854 for use as a troopship. She returned to her former civilian service in 1856.

Her interception by USS San Jacinto during the American Civil War in November 1861 provoked the Trent Affair, also known as the Mason and Slidell Affair, which nearly caused a war between the United Kingdom and the United States.

Trent continued in service until 1865, when she was sold and subsequently scrapped.
