= Henri Mercier =

French diplomat (1816–1886)

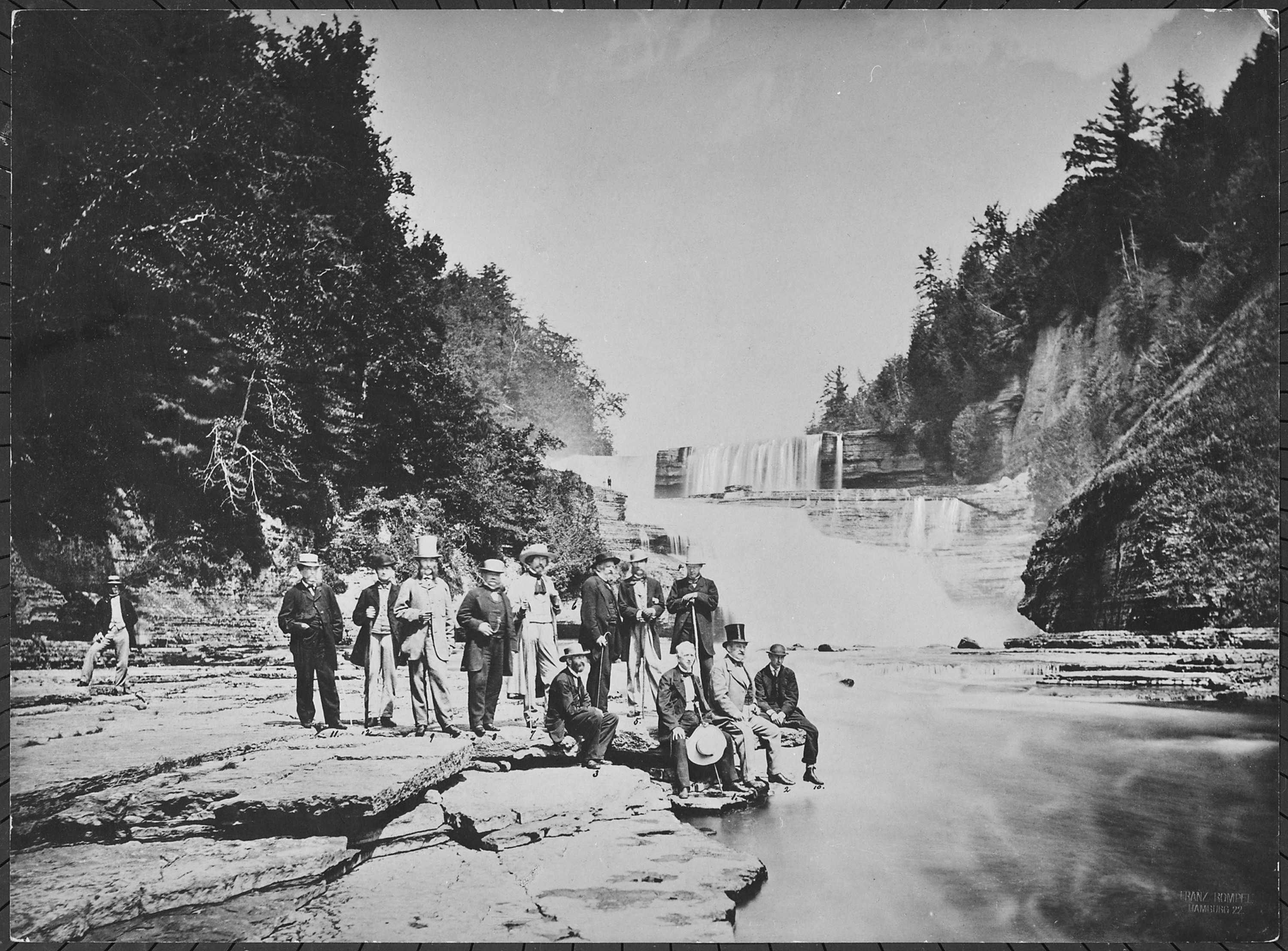
- Henri Mercier (center) with Rudolf Schleiden and Lord Lyons at a diplomatic convention in New York
- Known for: Trent Affair

Edouard Henri Mercier (French pronunciation: [ɑ̃ʁi mɛʁsje]; 1816 – 1886) was the French ambassador to the United States from July 1860 through December 1863 during the American Civil War (1861–1865). He is most noted for playing a key diplomatic role in the Trent Affair.

Mercier was born in Baltimore, the son of a French diplomat stationed in America. During the Civil War, he was generally thought to lean pro-South, visiting Richmond in 1862 and proposing a common market between the southern states and France. However, after the Emancipation Proclamation and subsequent change in favor towards the Union among the French and British public, he brought an offer from Napoleon III to mediate an end the war in 1863. This was angrily rejected by Secretary of State William H. Seward. Seeing little headway being made he asked to be reassigned to Spanish relations in 1863.

A full biography of Mercier was written by Daniel B. Carroll in 1971 titled Henri Mercier and the American Civil War.
