= British–Brazilian Treaty of 1826 =

Treaty requiring Brazil to abolish the slave trade

Convention between Great Britain and Brazil, for the Abolition of the African Slave Trade
- Signed: November 23, 1826
- Location: Rio de Janeiro, Empire of Brazil
- Negotiators: Robert Gordon Antônio Luís Pereira da Cunha José Egídio Álvares de Almeida
- Signatories: Empire of Brazil; United Kingdom
- Languages: English; Portuguese

Slave Trade (Convention with Brazil) Act 1827
- Act of Parliament
- Parliament of the United Kingdom
- Long title: An Act to carry into Execution a Convention between His Majesty and the Emperor of Brazil, for the Regulation and final Abolition of the African Slave Trade.
- Citation: 7 & 8 Geo. 4. c. 74
- Territorial extent: United Kingdom

Dates
- Royal assent: 2 July 1827
- Commencement: 2 July 1827 (Note: The Acts of Parliament (Commencement) Act 1793.)
- Repealed: 5 August 1873
Other legislation
Amended by	Slave Trade (Brazil) Act 1845
Repealed by	Slave Trade Act 1873

Status: Repealed

Text of statute as originally enacted

The British–Brazilian Treaty of 1826 was a treaty between the United Kingdom and the Empire of Brazil, by which Brazil agreed to ban the African slave trade.

It was signed at Rio de Janeiro on 23 November 1826. Exchange of ratifications took place on 13 March 1827, and the Parliament of the United Kingdom passed legislation on 2 July 1827 to enforce the treaty, the Slave Trade (Convention with Brazil) Act 1827 (7 & 8 Geo. 4. c. 74).

In 1827 Emperor Pedro I presented the treaty to the Chamber of Deputies for its approval; its Committee for Diplomacy and Statistics approved the convention by three votes to two. In response, on 2 July 1827, deputy Raimundo José da Cunha Mattos, a member of the Committee who opposed the treaty, delivered a two-hour speech in defence of the continuation of the slave trade.

The treaty made it illegal for any subject of the empire of Brazil to be engaged in carrying out the African slave trade. It provided a three-year grace period after the exchange of ratifications, which meant that the ban took effect on 13 March 1830.

The United Kingdom had mediated the Treaty of Rio de Janeiro (1825) by which Portugal recognised the independence of Brazil; the UK had made a commitment from Brazil to abolish the slave trade a condition of its support in securing recognition of Brazil's independence, and this treaty was agreed in fulfilment of that commitment.

Although Emperor Pedro I supported the treaty, it did not have widespread popular support in Brazil. As a result, the Brazilian government largely failed to enforce the treaty, and the slave trade to Brazil continued despite the treaty's ban. In response, the Parliament of the United Kingdom passed the Aberdeen Act: the Slave Trade (Brazil) Act 1845 (8 & 9 Vict. c. 122), which authorised British warships to board Brazilian ships and seize any found to be involved in the slave trade.
