= Christie Question =

Diplomatic crisis between the British Empire and the Empire of Brazil (1862–1865)

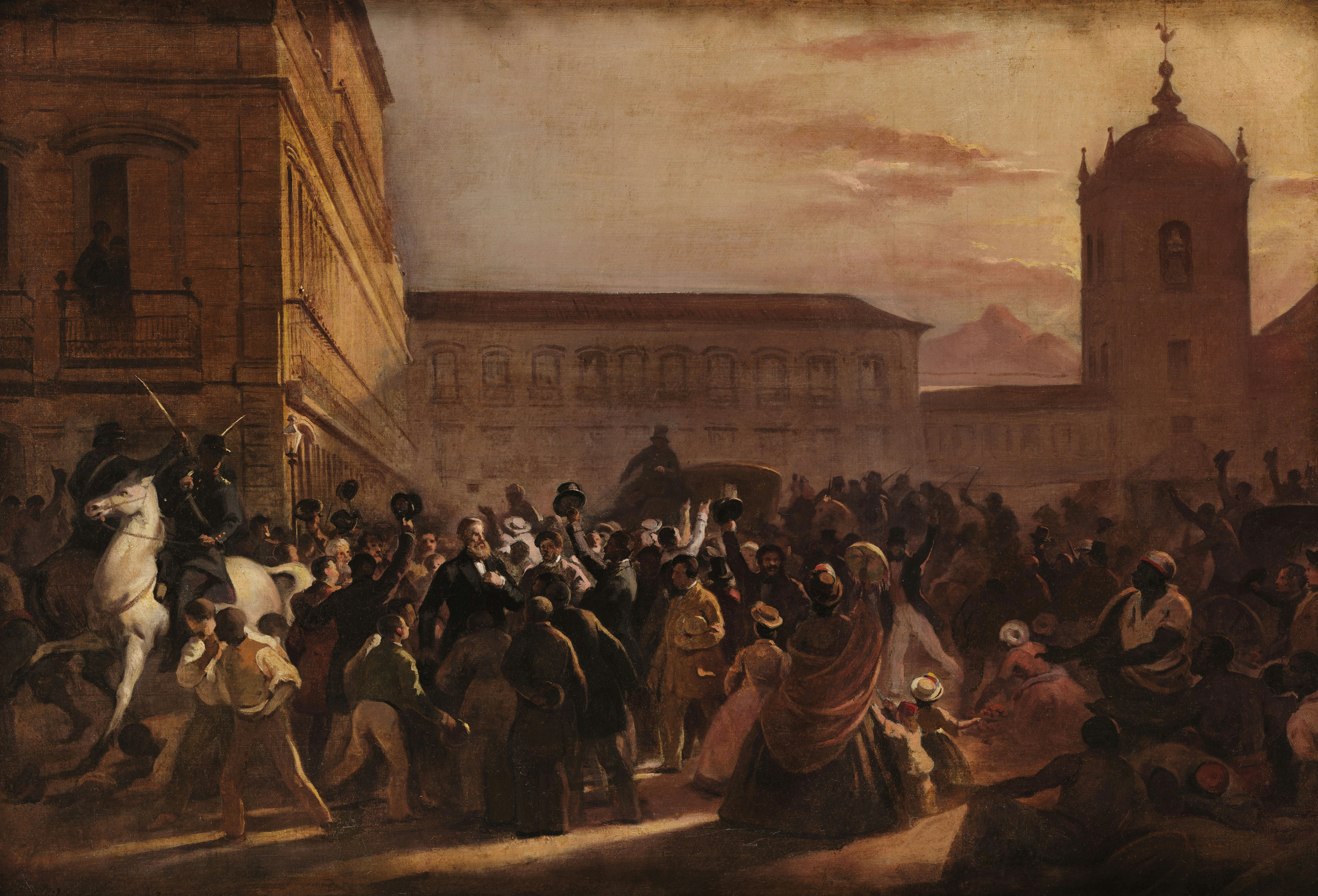
- Christie Question by Victor Meirelles (1864)
Date	1862–1865
Location	Empire of Brazil
Result	Peaceful conflict resolution; Release of British naval officers; Payment of compensation required by the British; Diplomatic relations resumed in 1865; Decision in favor of the Empire of Brazil; Formal withdrawal from the British Empire to the Brazilian government

Belligerents
British Empire	Empire of Brazil

Commanders and leaders
(British Empire) William Dougal Christie	(Empire of Brazil) Antônio Coelho

The Christie Question (Portuguese: Questão Christie) was a diplomatic crisis between the British Empire and the Empire of Brazil that took place from 1862 to 1865. This quasi-conflict was named after William Dougal Christie, then the United Kingdom Ambassador to Brazil. The Aberdeen Act, which gave Britain the right to seize (among others) Brazilian slave ships and free the enslaved people aboard, was the main cause behind the crisis.

== Antecedents ==
=== The Aberdeen Act ===
The Aberdeen Act which provided for the suppression of the slave trade (Slave Trade Suppression Act) of August 8, 1845, and the approval of the Eusébio de Queirós Law (September 4, 1850) aimed at curbing the slave trade to Brazil, resulted in practice in an intensified trade and the growth of anti-British feeling in Brazil. Although conservative leader Eusébio de Queirós had defended before lawmakers the need to take the decision to end trafficking and thus preserve the image of a sovereign nation, Britain's role was not hidden from public opinion.

Although with the treaty the tensions between both countries had diminished as a result of the end (or rather, reduction) of the slave trade, the perception of the agreement as a national humiliation would influence future events.

=== The sinking of the Prince of Wales ===
On April 2, 1861, the British merchant Prince of Wales sailed from Glasgow, Scotland, to the city of Buenos Aires, Argentina, with a load of carbon, ceramics, fabrics, oil and wine.

Between June 5 and 8, 1861, the ship ran aground on the coast of the then province of Rio Grande do Sul, in a desert region of dangerous beaches at the height of the Albardão Lighthouse 87 kilometers from the Arroio Chuí bar.

On the afternoon of June 12, the Justice of the Peace of Albardão district, Bento Venâncio Soares informed the British consul in Rio Grande, Henry Prendergast Vereker, that several bodies had been found on the coast, victims of a shipwreck.

Suspecting that it was a British ship, Vereker initiated inquiries and on June 14 he was able to identify the boat by a paper found on one of the victims. Accordingly on the morning of June 16 the consul was present at the scene of the wreck, where there were already 10 armed men from the next Tahim police sub-delegation in the charge of Faustino José da Silveira, brother-in-law of Bento Soares. There it was found that many of the barrels had recently been forced and emptied of their contents. Sub-delegate Delfino Francisco Gonçalves informed him that ten bodies, eight men, a woman, and a girl had been found and buried, being able to identify only the ship's captain, John McKinnon.

On June 20 he wrote to the Judge of Peace of Rio Grande, Antônio Estevão de Bittencourt e Silva and to Joaquim Antão Fernandes Leão, president of the province, complaining about the "culpable negligence of the local authorities" and expressing his suspicions that the castaways had been murdered by looters.

Vereker's dispatches to Secretary of Foreign Affairs Earl Russell soon had an answer. On September 5, the British government replied to the consul in Rio Grande that "It is evident that from their dispatches that there has been serious negligence, if not misconduct by the local authorities in Brazil, and that there are even reasons to suspect that the looting of the cargo, and the effects of the passengers, and even the murder of some survivors of the wreck, have been the result of that negligence." Then, it was communicated that the person in charge of business in Rio de Janeiro would receive instructions to pressure the imperial authorities.

Lord Russell also arranged for Rio's secretary of legation, Evan PM Baillie to transmit his orders to the Naval Station of the South Atlantic commanded by Rear Admiral Richard Laird Warren, so that the necessary naval force could be made available to Vereker to accompany his administrations.

In mid-September, investigations had succeeded in detaining only one of the participants in the looting, an indigenous man named Mariano Pinto and pointing out another, Manuel Maria Rodrigues, who had fled to Uruguay. The local police chief and the municipal judge Antônio Ferreira Garcês and the deputy of Tahim said they lacked resources and all the collaboration with neighbors who refused to appear as witnesses. They said they lacked complete evidence and even considered the "unfortunate Indian Mariano Pinto (...) one of the least culpable because he did not hide what he stole and immediately gave himself over to the inspector".

From the investigation, the widespread news of the shipwreck appeared well at least on June 9, neighbors interested in hiding the loot by communicating to the nearest inspector, who lived 6 leagues from the site, recently on the night of the 11th. The official notified the deputy of Tahim and approached the scene of what happened the following day. Recently on June 14, the police chief took official notice.

On October 17, Fernandes Leão had to leave the presidency of the state of Rio Grande do Sul in the hands of vice president Patrício José Correia da Câmara, but for early December the new investigations entrusted by Correia da Câmara to police chief Dario Rafael Callado they had not found any new results. Callado reiterated the difficulties in finding the real culprits and claimed that the suspects had already fled to Uruguay.

Despite Vereker's contrary opinion, and to Earl Russell's instincts, the British ambassador to Rio de Janeiro, William Dougal Christie, instructed Admiral Warren to make shipping available to a naval force area.

On March 31 in a train by HMS Oberon, the frigate HMS Sheldrake arrived in Rio Grande, leading Captain Thomas Saumarez, from HMS Forte (51 cannons), to collaborate with Vereker, whom he drove on April 4 to Porto Alegre to interview with the new president, Francisco de Assis Pereira Rocha, who on January 16, 1862 had replaced Correia da Câmara.

From that moment Christie's participation in the conflict grew. His counterpart was the Minister of Foreign Affairs of Brazil, Benevenuto Augusto Magalhães Taques (1818–1881), a member since July 10, 1861 of the cabinet led by conservative Luís Alves de Lima e Silva, Duque de Caxias. Christie was also "very confident in the rectitude of the present Minister of Justice", Francisco de Paula Negreiros from Saião Lobato, but there was no progress.

Given the lack of progress, in agreement with Vereker in April, Saumarez left Rio Grande to meet with Warren in Montevideo, but the decision was not to Russell's delight, who on July 4 sent a brief note to Christie: "I have to order him to insist on an appropriate investigation into the circumstances of the Prince of Wales shipwreck, and that a British officer should be on the ground during the investigation".

On May 13, Minister Taques informed the Legislative Assembly. On May 24, 1862, the crisis had caused the fall of Duque de Caxias and its replacement by Zacarias de Góis and Vasconcelos, whom he appointed Chancellor Carlos Carneiro de Campos, Third Viscount of Caravelas, and in Justice by Francisco José Furtado. However, the life of Zacarias's office was brief: on May 30 he was replaced by Pedro de Araújo Lima, Marquis of Olinda, who appointed Miguel Calmon du Pin e Almeida, Marquis of Abrantes, in Foreign Affairs and Caetano Maria Lopes Gama in Justice.

Although much of the public opinion resented the British attitude, it was recognized that Albardão was "the classic neighborhood of depreciations, thefts, murders and strangulations" [4] and that there was a crime and the State's inability to respond to it: " It is not Armstrong cannons that demand satisfaction, but the law of nations, the code that regulates international relations. The humiliations of 1851 cannot take account of what is happening now: where then there was abuse, now there is only a fair claim that must be satisfied ". [5]

Russell wrote to Christie on July 3 stating that although he had "very little hope of reaching a satisfactory conclusion on this matter" he pressured the imperial government to, in addition to finding the culprits, obtain damages: "Whether or not the authorities were guilty Brazil, there is no doubt that an oversight has been committed and that the matter reflects the little credit that the state of Brazilian civilization deserves, so in such circumstances it seems natural that the Brazilian Government should be eager to grant all the reparations that within reach".

== The crisis ==
In 1861, a British merchant ship Prince of Wales was wrecked off the coast of Rio Grande do Sul and many of its commodities were seized. The following year, British sailors were arrested in Rio de Janeiro for promoting mutinies. They were later released, but William Dougal Christie demanded compensation for the loss of the first incident and that the policemen who arrested the sailors be fired. Brazil did not comply with the demands, so Christie ordered British naval ships to seize Brazilian ships off the coast of Rio, of which five were subsequently seized.

In 1863, after some deliberation the Brazilian government agreed to pay for the Prince of Wales and put the matter of the sailors' arrests to an arbitrator, Leopold I the King of Belgium.

Leopold I decided in favor of Brazil, ruling that no insult to Great Britain had been intended. Emperor Pedro II then demanded restitution for its five ships. The British refused, and the Brazilians severed diplomatic relations with Great Britain. Although the British never paid for the seized Brazilian ships, Brazil restored diplomatic relations five years later for economic reasons.

== See also ==
- Bahia incident
