= Muribeca =

Municipality in Sergipe, Brazil

Coordinates: 10°25′37″S 36°57′32″W

- Municipality
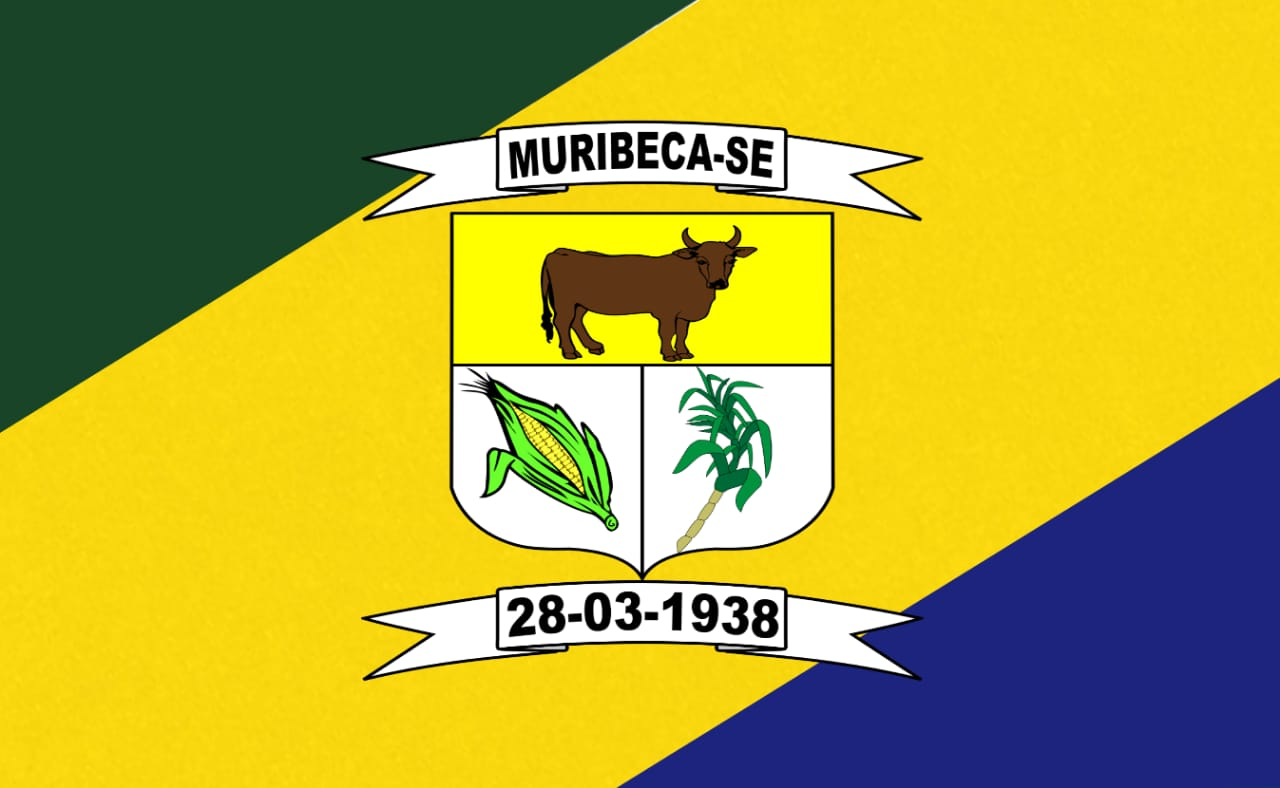
- Flag Coat of arms
- Interactive map of Muribeca
- Country: Brazil
- Time zone: UTC−3 (BRT)

Muribeca (Brazilian Portuguese pronunciation: [mʊɾiˈbɛkɐ]) is a municipality located in the Brazilian state of Sergipe. Its population was 7,639 (2020) and its area is 79 km^{2} (31 sq mi).

== See also ==
- List of municipalities in Sergipe
