= Aberdeen Act =

Act of the Parliament of the United Kingdom

Slave Trade (Brazil) Act 1845
- Act of Parliament
- Parliament of the United Kingdom
- Long title: An Act to amend an Act, intituled "An Act to carry into execution a Convention between His Majesty and the Emperor of Brazil, for the Regulation and final Abolition of the African Slave Trade."
- Citation: 8 & 9 Vict. c. 122
- Territorial extent: United Kingdom

Dates
- Royal assent: 8 August 1845
- Commencement: 8 August 1845 (Note: The Acts of Parliament (Commencement) Act 1793.)
- Repealed: 19 April 1869
Other legislation
Amends	Slave Trade (Convention with Brazil) Act 1827
Repealed by	Brazilian Slave Trade Repeal Act 1869

Status: Repealed

Text of statute as originally enacted

The Slave Trade (Brazil) Act 1845 (8 & 9 Vict. c. 122), commonly known as the Aberdeen Act and in Brazil as Bill Aberdeen, was an act of the Parliament of the United Kingdom passed during the reign of Queen Victoria on 9 August 1845.

This law is seen in Brazilian historiography as a British retaliation against the Alves Branco Tariff, a tariff reform established in 1844 by Finance Minister Manuel Alves Branco that raised import duties followed by the ending of the British-Brazilian Convention of 1826 on the Atlantic slave trade to Brazil.

== History ==
The act was proposed by British Foreign Secretary Lord Aberdeen. It gave the Royal Navy authority to stop and search any Brazilian ship suspected of being a slave ship on the high seas, and to arrest slave traders caught on these ships.

The act stipulated that arrested slave traders could be tried in British courts. The law was designed to suppress the Brazilian slave trade, to make effective Brazilian laws and the British-Brazilian Treaty of 1826 to end the Atlantic slave trade, that Brazil had signed and ratified but failed to enforce.

It provoked outrage in Brazil, where it was seen as a violation of free market, freedom of navigation, as an affront to Brazilian sovereignty and territorial integrity, and as an attempt to check Brazil's rise as a world power.

== Responses and concerns ==
As a result, the Royal Navy began intercepting Brazilian slavers on the high seas, and Brazilian slave traders caught on these ships were prosecuted in British admiralty courts. Over the following years, the number of cases in British admiralty courts increased dramatically due to the large number of Brazilians arrested for slave-trading – in the first six months of 1848, 19 out of 33 cases heard by the vice admiralty court in St. Helena were Brazilian.

Despite the aggressive application of this law, the volume of the Brazilian slave trade increased in the late 1840s; the demand for slaves had increased due to British free-trade legislation that lifted tariffs on Brazilian sugar. However, Anglo-Brazilian tensions continued to increase. In 1850-51, a handful of British ships began entering Brazilian territorial waters and even its harbours to attack slave ships. In one instance, a British ship exchanged fire with a Brazilian fort.

In the face of these tensions, Brazil knew that it could not afford to go to war with Britain. In addition, popular sentiment against the slave trade in Brazil was growing. The Brazilian government decided to put an end to the slave trade. In September 1850, new legislation outlawing the slave trade was enacted, and the Brazilian government began to enforce it.

As a result, the Brazilian slave trade declined, and despite some illegal slavers that continued to operate, the trade came to an end in the mid-1850s, although slavery itself was not abolished in Brazil until 1888. On 27 April 1852, the British government notified its counterpart in Brazil of its permanent withdrawal of warships from Brazilian waters, on condition that there be no resumption of the slave trade; the reports of the British minister to Brazil in 1860 and the following year, showed no indication of breach. Finally satisfied there would be no resumption of the African slave trade, the British parliament repealed the Aberdeen Act on 19 April 1869.

== See also ==
- Pax Britannica
- Slave Trade Act
