= William Haggard (diplomat) =

British diplomat (1846–1926)

Sir William Haggard KCMG CB FRGS FRAS

British Minister to Brazil
- In office 1906–1914
- Preceded by: Sir Henry Dering, 9th Bt
- Succeeded by: Sir Arthur Peel

British Minister to Argentina
- In office 1902–1906
- Preceded by: Sir William Barrington
- Succeeded by: Sir Walter Townley

British Minister to Venezuela
- In office 1897–1902
- Preceded by: no diplomat
- Succeeded by: Sir Henry Bax-Ironside

British Minister to Ecuador
- In office 1890–1894
- Preceded by: Sir Charles Edward Mansfield
- Succeeded by: Henry Mitchell Jones

Personal details
- Born: 25 June 1846
- Died: 22 January 1926 (aged 79) Menton France
- Relations: Brother H. Rider Haggard
- Children: 3
- Education: Magdalen College, Oxford
- Occupation: Diplomat

Sir William Henry Doveton Haggard (25 June 1846 – 22 January 1926) was a British diplomat who served as minister resident in Ecuador (1890–1894); Venezuela (1897–1902); Argentina (1902–1906); and Brazil (1906–1914).

== Early life and education ==
Haggard was born on 25 June 1846, the eldest son of William Meybohm Rider Haggard of Bradenham Hall, Norfolk, and Ella Doveton. He was educated at Tonbridge School and Winchester College, and in 1865 went up to Magdalen College, Oxford.

== Career ==
Haggard entered the Diplomatic Service in 1869, and served successively at Bern, Madrid, Washington, Tehran, Vienna and Stuttgart. In 1885, he was at Rio de Janeiro then as second secretary, and in 1887 at Athens. In 1890, he was appointed minister resident at Quito, and in 1894, consul-general at Tunis.

From 1897 to 1902, Haggard served as minister resident at Caracas, and then from 1902 to 1906 as envoy extraordinary and minister plenipotentiary to Argentina and Paraguay at Buenos Aires and Asuncion. In 1906, he was appointed envoy extraordinary and minister plenipotentiary to Brazil, a post he held until his retirement in 1914.

Haggard was a Fellow of the Royal Geographical (FRGS) and the Royal Asiatic Society (FRAS). In 1882, he published The Vazir of Lankuran, a standard work for the study of Persian, with Guy Le Strange.

== Personal life and death ==
Haggard married Emily Margaret Hancox in 1887 and they had a son and two daughters. His brother was the novelist, H. Rider Haggard.

Haggard died in Menton, France, on 22 January 1926, aged 79.

== Honours ==
Haggard was appointed Knight Commander of the Order of St Michael and St George (KCMG) in 1908. He was appointed Companion of the Order of the Bath (CB) in 1903.

== See also ==
- Ecuador–United Kingdom relations
- Venezuela–United Kingdom relations
- Argentina–United Kingdom relations
- Brazil–United Kingdom relations

Diplomatic posts
Preceded by Sir Charles Edward Mansfield	British Minister to Ecuador; 1890–1894	Succeeded by Henry Mitchell Jones
Preceded by no diplomat	British Minister to Venezuela; 1897–1902	Succeeded by Sir Henry Bax-Ironside
Preceded by Sir William Barrington	British Minister to Argentina; 1902–1906	Succeeded by Sir Walter Townley
Preceded by Sir Henry Dering, 9th Bt	British Minister to Brazil; 1906–1914	Succeeded by Sir Arthur Peel
