= List of ambassadors of the United Kingdom to Venezuela =

The ambassador of the United Kingdom to Venezuela is the United Kingdom's foremost diplomatic representative to Venezuela, and in charge of the UK's diplomatic mission in Venezuela. The official title is His Britannic Majesty's Ambassador to the Bolivarian Republic of Venezuela.

== List of heads of mission ==
- 1825–1835: Sir Robert Ker Porter, Consul at Caracas
- 1835–1841: Sir Robert Ker Porter, Chargé d'Affaires and Consul General
- 1841–1843: Sir Daniel Florence O'Leary, Acting Consul General
- February 1858: Sir Philip Edmund Wodehouse, Special Mission to Caracas

=== Chargé d'affaires and consuls-general ===
==== Republic of Venezuela ====
- 1842–1858: Belford Hinton Wilson
- 1858–1864: Frederic Doveton Orme
- 1864–1865: Hon. Richard Edwardes

==== United States of Venezuela ====
- 1865–1869: George Fagan
- 1869–1873: Robert Thomas Charles Middleton

=== Ministers resident and consuls-general to the United States of Venezuela ===
- 1873–1878: Robert Thomas Charles Middleton

=== Ministers resident ===
==== United States of Venezuela ====
- 1878–1881: Robert Bunch
- 1881–1884: Charles Edward Mansfield

==== Republic of Venezuela ====
- 1884–1887: Frederick Robert St John
- 1887–1897: Diplomatic relations severed over Essequibo territorial dispute

==== Carácas ====
- 1897–1902: Sir William Haggard
- 1902–1907: Henry Bax-Ironside
- 1908–1911: Sir Vincent Edwin Henry Corbett

==== United States of Venezuela ====
- 1911–1913: Frederic Dundas Harford

=== Envoys extraordinary and ministers plenipotentiary to the United States of Venezuela ===
- 1913–1916: Frederic Dundas Harford
- 1916–1923: Henry Beaumont
- 1923–1925: Andrew Percy Bennett
- 1925–1926: William Seeds
- 1926–1932: William Edmund O'Reilly
- 1932–1936: Edward Allis Keeling
- 1936–1939: Sir Ernest Frederick Gye
- 1939–1944: Donald St Clair Gainer

=== Ambassadors extraordinary and plenipotentiary to the Republic of Venezuela ===
- 1944–1948: Sir George Ogilvie-Forbes
- 1948–1951: Sir John Magowan
- 1951–1955: Sir Robert Urquhart
- 1955–1961: John Walker
- 1961–1964: Sir Douglas Busk
- 1964–1969: Anthony Lincoln
- 1969–1973: Sir Donald Hopson
- 1973–1975: Sir Lees Mayall
- 1975–1979: Sir Jock Taylor
- 1979–1982: Reginald Secondé
- 1982–1985: Hugh Carless CMG
- 1985–1988: Michael Newington CMG
- 1988–1994: Giles FitzHerbert CMG
- 1994–1997: John Flynn CMG
- 1997–2000: Richard Wilkinson CVO
- 2000–2003: Dr John Hughes
- 2003–2006: Donald Lamont
- 2006–2007: Susan Jane Breeze, chargé d'affaires from Dec 2006 until Jan 2007
- 2007–2010: Catherine Royle
- 2010–2014: Catherine Nettleton OBE
- 2014–2017: John Saville
- 2021–2023: Becks Buckingham OBE, chargé d'affaires
- 2023–Present: Colin Dick MBE, chargé d’affaires ad interim
