= Arthur Fagan =

Arthur Fagan may refer to:

- Arthur Fagan (cricketer) (born 1931), Australian cricketer
- Arthur Fagan (fencer) (1890–1977), British Olympic fencer
- Arthur Fagan (rugby union)
