= Vincent Corbett =

British diplomat (1861–1936)

Sir Vincent Corbett KCVO
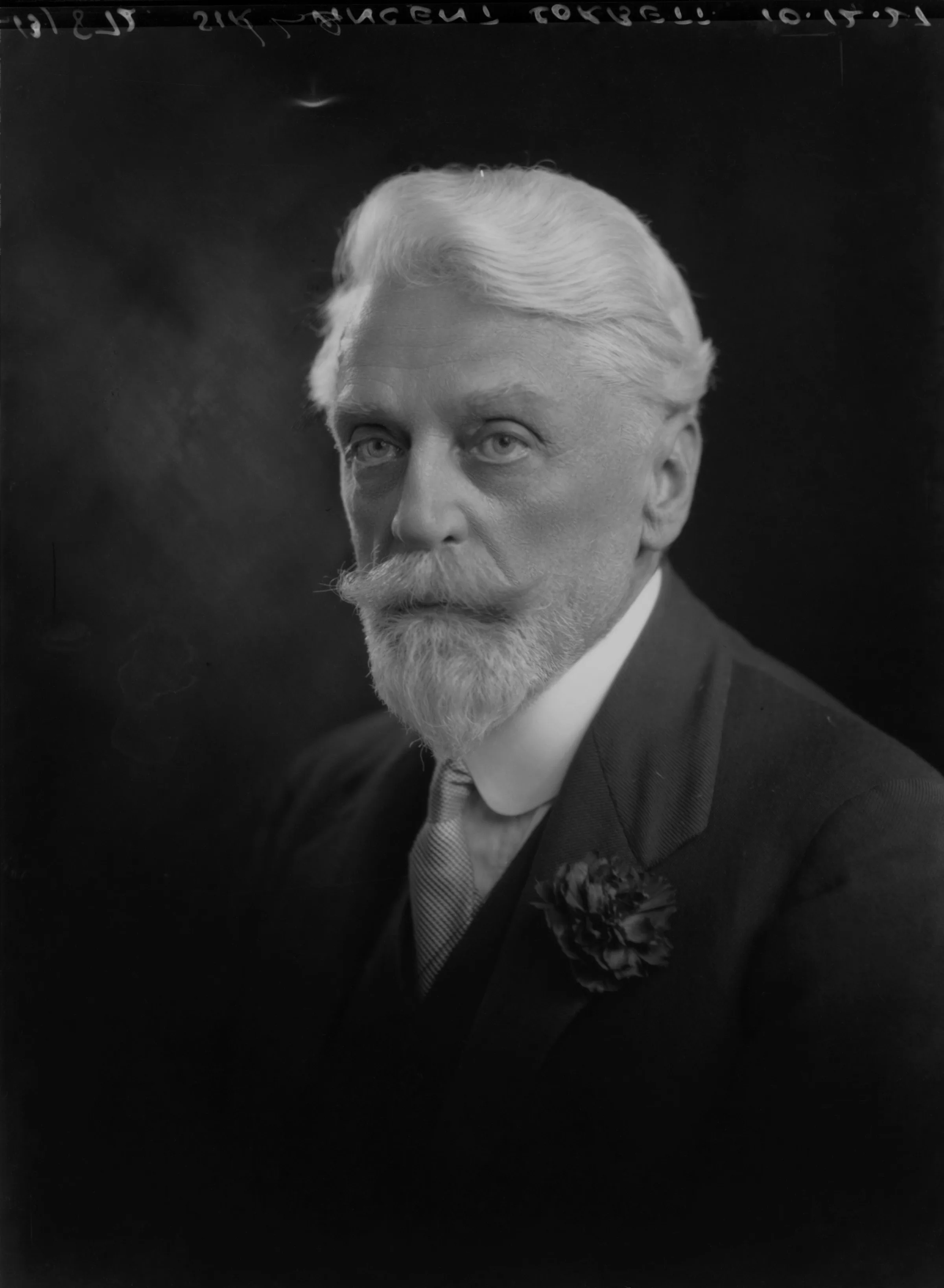
- Corbett in 1927

British Minister to Venezuela
- In office 1908–1910
- Preceded by: Sir Henry Bax-Ironside
- Succeeded by: Frederic Dundas Harford

British Minister to Württemberg and Bavaria
- In office 1910–1914
- Preceded by: Sir Ralph Paget
- Succeeded by: Post abolished

Personal details
- Born: 22 May 1861
- Died: 22 December 1936 (aged 75) Brighton
- Education: Trinity College, Cambridge
- Occupation: Diplomat

Sir Vincent Edwin Henry Corbett (22 May 1861 – 22 December 1936) was a British diplomat who served as minister to Venezuela from 1908 to 1910 and minister to Württemberg and Bavaria from 1910 to 1914.

== Early life and education ==
Corbett was born on 22 May 1861, the son of Edwin Corbett, a British diplomat. He was educated at Wellington College and Trinity College, Cambridge.

== Career ==
Corbett joined the Foreign Office in 1884, and in the following year was posted to Berlin as attaché, promoted to third secretary in 1886. He was in Rome in 1888, and promoted to second secretary in 1891. He was then sent to Constantinople in 1891; Copenhagen in 1894; and Athens in 1895. In 1898, he was appointed the British representative on the International Financial Commission for the Control of Greek Finance, and in 1900 was appointed Secretary of the Legation.

In 1903, Corbett served as the British commissioner on the Caisse de la Dette Publique in Egypt, and was appointed Councillor of Embassy. In the following year, he became financial adviser to Egyptian Government, and remained in the post until 1907. From 1908 to 1910, he served as Minister Resident to Venezuela, and then Minister Resident to Württemberg and Bavaria from 1910 to 1914.

Following the outbreak of World War I, his post of ambassador at the Bavarian Court ceased to exist. He resigned from the Foreign Service, and in 1917 was appointed temporary captain in the Bedfordshire Regiment where he served until 1919. In 1927, he published his memoirs, Reminiscences: Autobiographical and Diplomatic of Sir Vincent Corbett.

== Personal life and death ==
Corbett married Mabel Beatrice Sturt, daughter of the Ist Baron Alington (died 1899), in 1895.

Corbett died on 22 December 1936 in Brighton, aged 75.

== Honours ==
Corbett was appointed Knight Commander of the Royal Victorian Order (KCVO) in 1905. He was awarded the Grand Cordon of Imperial Orders of Osmanieh and Medjidieh.

== See also ==
- Germany–United Kingdom relations
- United Kingdom–Venezuela relations

Diplomatic posts
Preceded by Sir Henry Bax-Ironside	British Minister to Venezuela; 1908–1910	Succeeded by Frederic Dundas Harford
Preceded by Sir Ralph Paget	British Minister to Württemberg and Bavaria; 1910–1914	Succeeded by post abolished
