= Augustus Paget =

British diplomat (1823–1896)

The Right Honourable Sir Augustus Paget GCB
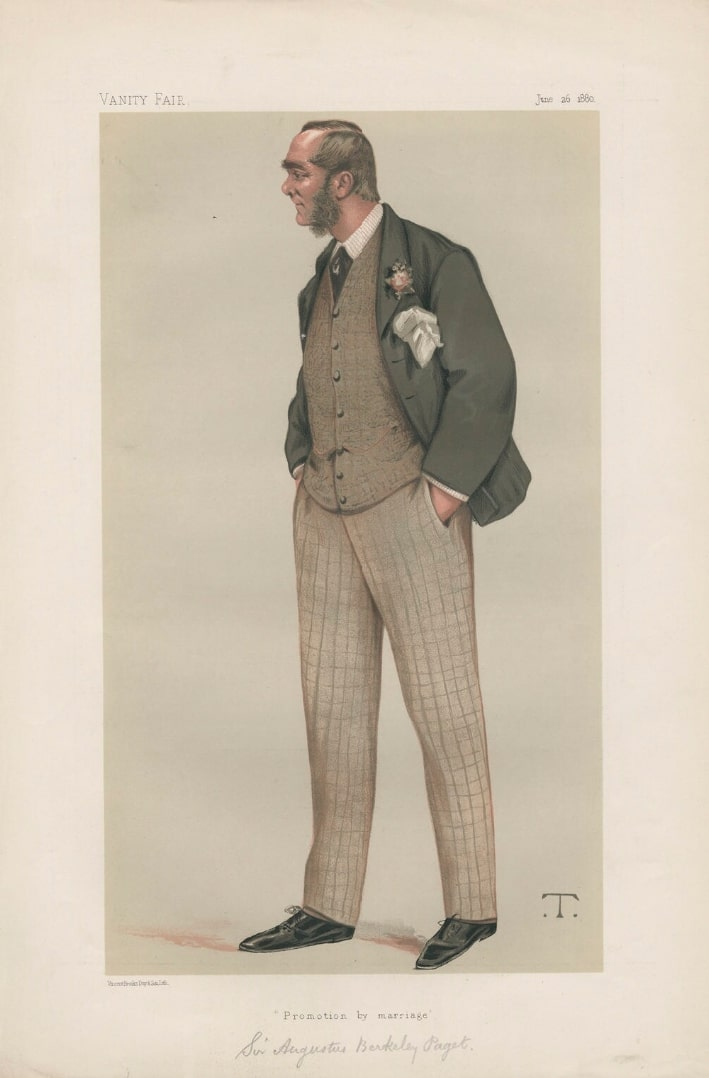

British Ambassador to Austria-Hungary
- In office 1884–1893
- Monarch: Victoria
- Preceded by: Henry Elliot-Murray-Kynynmound
- Succeeded by: Sir Edmund Monson

Personal details
- Born: 16 April 1823
- Died: 11 July 1896 (Aged 73)
- Spouse: Countess Walburga von Hohenthal (m. 1860)
- Children: 3

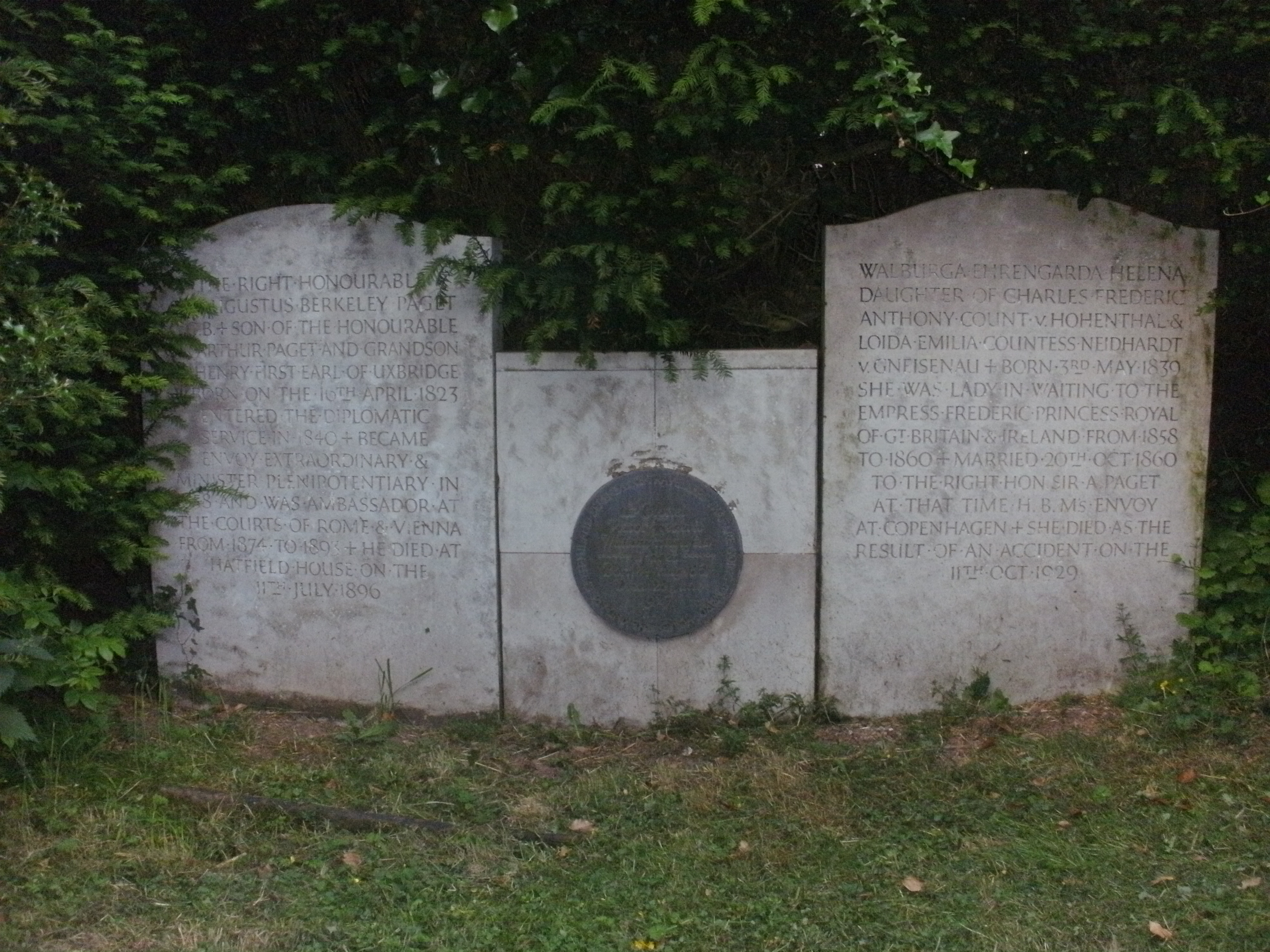
Paget family plot in the cemetery of St Bartholomew's church, Tardebigge, Worcestershire, with the graves of Sir Augustus Berkeley Paget, GCB (1823–1896) and his wife Walburga Ehrengarde Helena (née Countess von Hohenthal, 1839–1929)

Sir Augustus Berkeley Paget GCB (16 April 1823 – 11 July 1896) was a British diplomat. In 1876, Paget was appointed a member of Queen Victoria's privy council.

== Biography ==
Augustus Berkeley Paget was born on 16 April 1823, member of the Paget family, the son of the diplomat Arthur Paget and his wife, Lady Augusta Fane, divorced in 1809 from John Parker, 2nd Baron Borigndon. He was the nephew of General Sir Edward Paget and grandson of Henry Bayly Paget, 1st Earl of Uxbridge. He was educated at Charterhouse, and in 1840 he entered the service of the crown as clerk in the secretary's department of the general Post Office. He was soon transferred to the Audit Office, and again on 21 August 1841 to the more competitive Foreign Office.

Paget then decided to enter the diplomatic service, and on 2 December 1843, obtained an appointment as temporary attaché at Madrid, where he remained till 1846. On 6 February 1846, he was appointed precis writer to the foreign secretary, Lord Aberdeen, but on 26 June became second paid attaché to the British embassy at Paris. Here he witnessed the French demonstration of 15 May 1848, and the establishment of the second empire; on 18 December 1851 he became first paid attaché. On 12 February 1852, he was promoted to be secretary of legation at Athens at a time when diplomatic relations with Greece were more or less in abeyance, so that his position was peculiar and required much tact. On 8 December 1852, he went on to Egypt and acted as consul-general till 19 February 1853, returned to England on leave of absence on 27 May 1853, and was transferred to The Hague as secretary of legation on 14 January 1854. Here he acted as chargé d'affaires from 7 May to 21 October 1855, and again from 3 July to 24 August 1856. He was transferred to Lisbon on 18 February 1857, and acted as chargé d'affaires from 9 July 1857 to 14 January 1858. On 1 April 1858, he was sent to Berlin and acted as chargé d'affaires from 17 June to 20 November 1858. On 13 December 1858, he was appointed envoy extraordinary and minister plenipotentiary to the King of Saxony. On 6 June 1859, he was gazetted to the post of minister at the court of Sweden and Norway, but on 6 July this appointment was cancelled in favour of that to Denmark.

As minister at Copenhagen, Paget saw the accession of Christian IX at the close of 1863, and had to play a leading part in regard to the Schleswig-Holstein difficulty in 1864; nor was his position much less difficult when in 1866 Prussia meditated war against Austria. On 9 June 1866, he was sent to Portugal as envoy extraordinary. Appointed on 6 July 1867 to Italy as envoy extraordinary and minister plenipotentiary to Victor Emmanuel, he represented Great Britain in Italy during one of the most critical periods of Italian history; he saw the entry of the Italian troops into Rome and the beginning of a new era of national life. It is admitted that in this trying period his tact was conspicuous. He remained in Italy for a long time, becoming ambassador extraordinary on 24 March 1876. On 12 September 1883 he relinquished this post and, after a short period of leave, became ambassador at Vienna on 1 January 1884. From that post he retired on 1 July 1893.

== Family ==
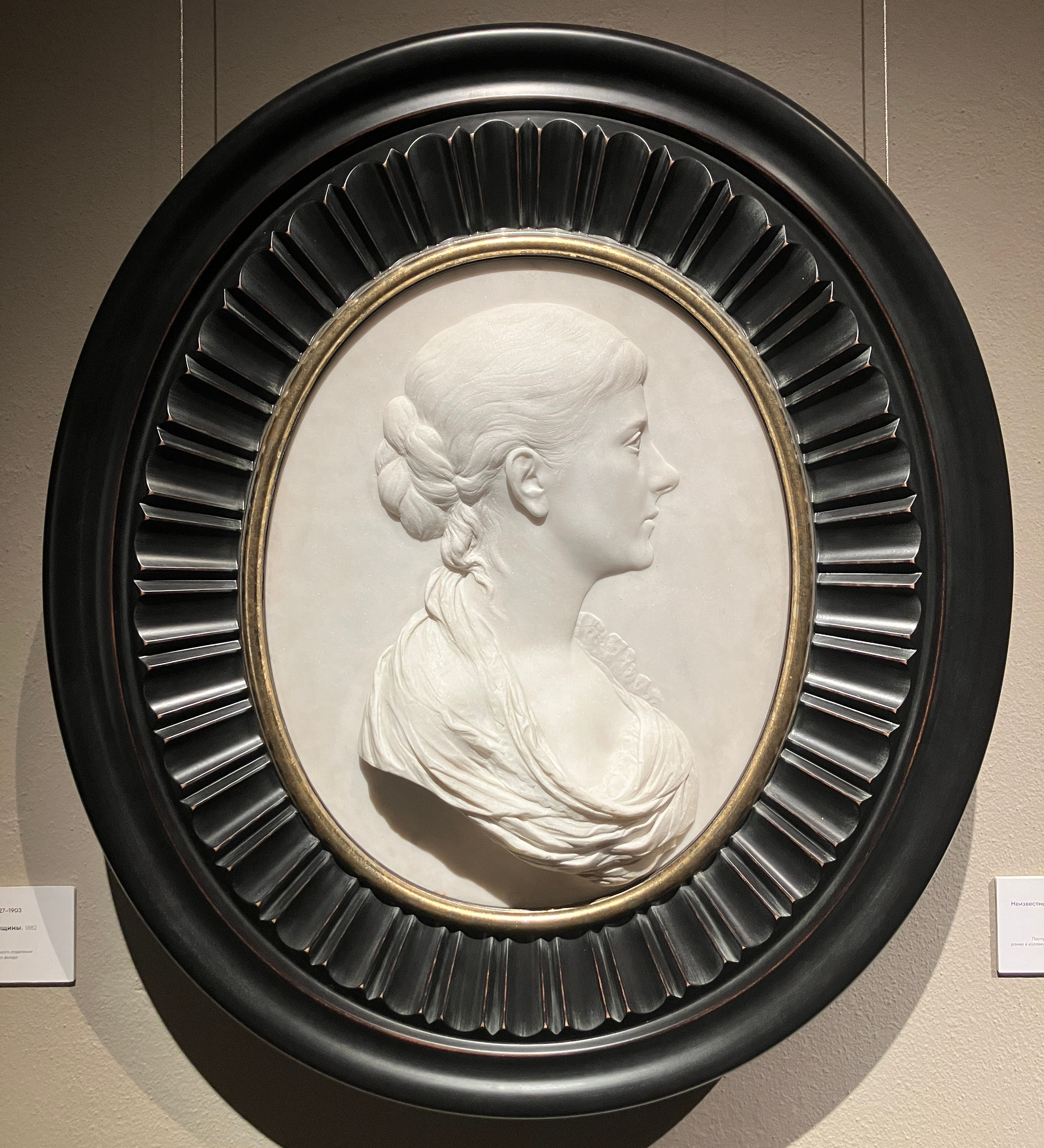
Portrait of a daughter, Alberta Victoria Sarah Caroline Paget by Joseph von Kopf. 1882. Museum named after M. A. Vrubel

Paget married in 1860 Countess Walburga Ehrengarde Helena von Hohenthal, member of the noble German House of Hohethaal. The couple had three children, two boys and one girl:

1. Victor Frederick William Augustus Paget (1861–1927), a Lieutenant Colonel
2. Alberta Victoria Sarah Caroline Paget (1863–1944), married Robert Windsor-Clive, 1st Earl of Plymouth, GBE, CB, PC (1857–1923)
3. Ralph Paget (1864–1940, later became Sir Ralph Paget, KCMG, CVO, PC)

Sir Augustus died on 11 July 1896 and was buried in the cemetery of Tardebigge, Worcestershire, next to the family plot of the Earls of Plymouth.

His wife later achieved fame in her own right by publishing memoirs of her life in their various embassies.

Diplomatic posts
Preceded by Henry George Elliot	British Minister to Italy; 1867–1876	mission upgraded
New title mission upgraded	British Ambassador to Italy; 1876–1883	Succeeded by Sir John Savile
Preceded by Henry Elliot-Murray-Kynynmound	British Ambassador to Austria-Hungary; 1884–1893	Succeeded by Sir Edmund Monson
