= John Walker (diplomat) =

British diplomat (1906–1984)

Sir John Walker KCMG OBE

British Ambassador to Norway
- In office 1961–1962
- Preceded by: Sir Peter Scarlett
- Succeeded by: Sir Patrick Hancock

British Ambassador to Venezuela
- In office 1955–1961
- Preceded by: Sir Robert Urquhart
- Succeeded by: Sir Douglas Busk

Personal details
- Born: 27 June 1906
- Died: 6 October 1984 (aged 78)
- Children: 2
- Education: University of London
- Occupation: Diplomat

Sir John Walker (27 June 1906 – 6 October 1984) was a British diplomat who served as ambassador to Venezuela from 1955 to 1961 and ambassador to Norway from 1961 to 1962.

== Early life and education ==
Walker was born on 27 June 1906, the son of Rupert Walker. He was educated at Ashby Grammar School, University of London, and Sorbonne University.

== Career ==
Walker joined the Department of Overseas Trade in 1929 as an intelligence officer cadet. In 1931, he was assistant to the commercial secretary at the legation at Santiago, Chile, before he was transferred to Buenos Aires. After taking charge of the commercial secretariat at Santiago in 1933, he returned later that year to Buenos Aires.

Walker was then transferred to Baghdad where he served as commercial secretary from 1938 to 1943. After serving for several years in Madrid as first secretary and then commercial counsellor, he was transferred to Tehran in 1948 as commercial counsellor, and acted as chargé d’affaires in 1952. The following year, he was appointed an inspector of foreign service establishments.

In 1955, Walker was appointed ambassador extraordinary and plenipotentiary at Caracas, Venezuela, a post he occupied until 1960. He then served as ambassador to Norway from 1960 to 1961.

In retirement, Walker served as director-general of the Hispanic and Luso-Brazilian Councils from 1963 to 1969. In 1968, he was made a Fellow of University College London.

== Personal life and death ==
Walker married Muriel Winifred née Hill in 1934, and they had two sons.

Walker died on 6 October 1984, aged 78.

== Honours ==
- Walker was appointed Companion of the Order of St Michael and St George (CMG) in the 1951 Birthday Honours, and promoted to Knight Commander (KCMG) in the 1959 Birthday Honours.
- He was appointed Officer of the Order of the British Empire (OBE) in the 1947 Birthday Honours.
- In 1962, he was awarded the Knight Grand Cross, Order of St. Olav of Norway.

== See also ==
- Venezuela–United Kingdom relations
- Norway–United Kingdom relations

Diplomatic posts
Preceded by Sir Robert Urquhart	British Ambassador to Venezuela; 1955–1961	Succeeded by Sir Douglas Busk
Preceded by Sir Peter Scarlett	British Ambassador to Norway; 1961–1962	Succeeded by Sir Patrick Hancock
