= Robert Urquhart (diplomat) =

British diplomat (1896–1983)

Sir Robert Urquhart KBE CMG

British Ambassador to Venezuela
- In office 1951–1955
- Preceded by: Sir John Magowan
- Succeeded by: Sir John Walker

British Consul-General in Shanghai
- In office 1948–1950
- Preceded by: Sir Michael Cavenagh Gillett
- Succeeded by: Kenneth Bumstead

Personal details
- Born: 14 August 1896
- Died: 17 March 1983 (aged 86) Edinburgh
- Children: 4
- Occupation: Diplomat

Sir Robert William Urquhart (14 August 1896 – 17 March 1983) was a British diplomat who served as consul-general in Shanghai from 1948 to 1950 and ambassador to Venezuela from 1951 to 1955.

== Early life and education ==
Urquhart was born on 14 August 1896, the son of Robert Urquhart and Margaret Stewart. He was educated in Aberdeen and at Cambridge.

== Career ==
Urquhart was appointed a probationer vice-consul in the Levant Consular Service in 1920 after passing the examination. In 1921, he was sent to Smyrna and given the temporary rank of acting consul-general. From 1924 to 1926, he served as vice-consul at Cairo, and then from 1926 to 1930, as acting consul in Greece. After two years at Beirut as acting consul-general, he was promoted to consul and sent to Tabriz in 1934.

In 1938, Urquhart was transferred to the Foreign Office, and in the following year was appointed inspector-general of consulates. After a year on secondment to the Home Office, he was appointed consul-general at Tabriz in 1942 before he was transferred to New Orleans in 1943. In 1947, after serving as inspector-general of consulates, he served as minister at Washington from 1947 to 1948. He then served as consul-general at Shanghai from 1948 to 1950, and praised the British community there who faced extreme difficulties caused by the war in China. The following year was appointed ambassador to Venezuela, a post he held from 1951 to 1955.

After retiring from the Diplomatic Service, he was appointed chairman of the Crofters' Commission, a post he held from 1955 to 1963.

== Personal life and death ==
Urquhart married twice. First in 1925 to Brenda Gertrude Phillips with whom he had four daughters. After she died in 1975, he married Jane Gibson in 1977. In 1954, he was awarded an Honorary Doctors of Law degree from the University of Aberdeen.

Urquhart died on 17 March 1983 at Edinburgh, aged 86.

== Honours ==
- Urquhart was appointed Companion of the Order of St Michael and St George (CMG) in the 1944 Birthday Honours.
- He was appointed Officer of the Order of the British Empire (OBE) in the 1923 Birthday Honours, and promoted to Knight Commander (KBE) in the 1950 New Year Honours.

== See also ==
- China–United Kingdom relations
- Venezuela–United Kingdom relations

Diplomatic posts
Preceded by Sir Michael Cavenagh Gillett	British Consul-General in Shanghai; 1948–1950	Succeeded by Kenneth Bumstead
Preceded by Sir John Magowan	British Ambassador to Venezuela; 1951–1955	Succeeded by Sir John Walker
