= Mary Pope =

Mary Pope may refer to:

- Mary Pope (vegetarian), English cookery teacher and writer
- Mary Pope Osborne (born 1949), American children's book author
- USS Mary Pope (SP-291), a United States Navy patrol vessel in commission from 1917 to 1919
- Namesake of the Mary Soper Pope Memorial Award
