= Sir Henry Dering, 9th Baronet =

British diplomat

Sir Henry Neville Dering, 9th Baronet, KCMG, CB, DL (21 September 1839 – 25 August 1906) was a British diplomat.

Dering was the son of Sir Edward Dering, 8th Baronet, a Liberal Party politician. He succeeded his father as baronet in 1896.

He was Envoy Extraordinary and Minister Plenipotentiary to the United States of Mexico 1894–1900, and Envoy Extraordinary and Minister Plenipotentiary to the United States of Brazil 1900–1906. On 21 September 1900, he was appointed a deputy lieutenant of Kent.

He married, in 1853, Rosa Underwood, daughter of Jos. Underwood. They were parents of the next Baronet, Henry Edward Dering. His second son, Sir Herbert Guy Dering, was British Minister to Siam, Bulgaria, and Romania.

Diplomatic posts
Preceded by Hon. Power Henry Le Poer Trench	Envoy Extraordinary and Minister Plenipotentiary to the United States of Mexico; 1894–1900	Succeeded by George Greville
Preceded by Constantine Phipps	Envoy Extraordinary and Minister Plenipotentiary to the United States of Brazil; 1900–1906	Succeeded by William H. D. Haggard
Baronetage of England
Preceded by Edward Dering	Baronet (of Surrenden Dering); 1896–1906	Succeeded by Henry Dering
