= Henry Lowther (diplomat) =

British diplomat (1858–1939)

Sir Henry Crofton Lowther GCVO KCMG (26 March 1858 – 23 November 1939) was a British diplomat, ambassador to Chile and Denmark.

== Career ==
Henry Crofton Lowther was educated at Harrow School and Balliol College, Oxford. In 1879, he rowed in the Balliol VIII which went to the Head of the River. He joined the Diplomatic Service with the rank of attaché in 1883, and was eventually posted to The Hague in 1884, promoted to 3rd secretary in 1885, and posted to Stockholm in 1886 and to Berlin in 1888. He was promoted to 2nd secretary with a posting to Rio de Janeiro, then moved to Constantinople in 1892, Madrid in 1894 and Bern in 1897.

Lowther returned to Rio de Janeiro as First Secretary of Legation in 1901, was posted to Tokyo as Councillor of Embassy in 1906, and was chargé d'affaires at Madrid, Bern, Rio de Janeiro and Tokyo before being appointed Minister to Chile 1909–13 and finally minister to Denmark 1913–16 "where he did good work and was a popular member of the Diplomatic Corps of that capital".

Lowther was knighted KCMG in 1913 on appointment to Copenhagen, and GCVO in 1914, on the occasion of the King of Denmark's visit to England. The Danish government awarded him the Grand Cross of the Order of the Dannebrog.

Diplomatic posts
Preceded by Henry Bax-Ironside	Envoy Extraordinary and Minister Plenipotentiary to the Republic of Chile; 1909-13	Succeeded by Sir Francis Stronge
Preceded by William Conyngham Greene	Envoy Extraordinary and Minister Plenipotentiary to His Majesty the King of Denmark; 1913–16	Succeeded by Ralph Spencer Paget
