= Henry Elliot =

British diplomat

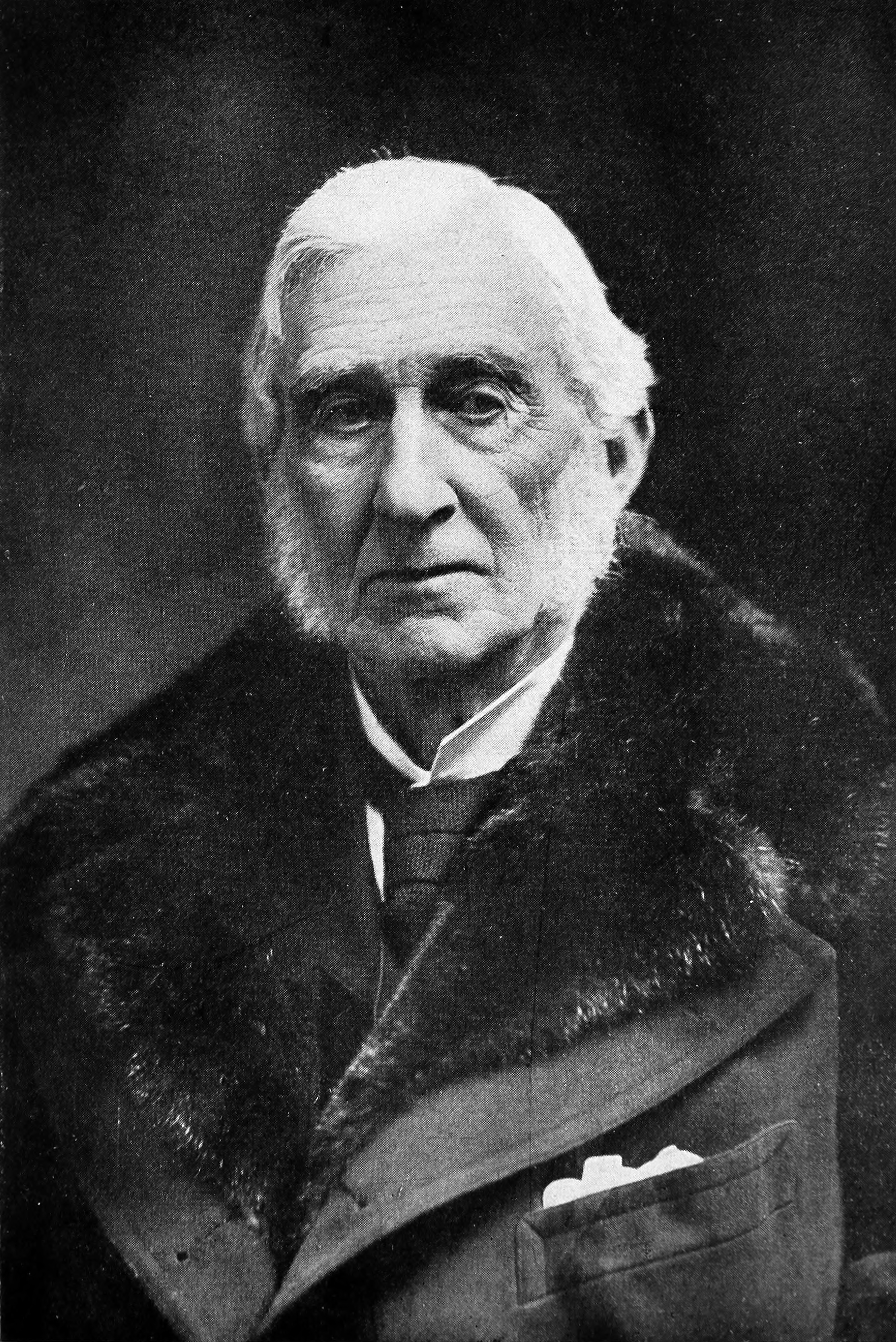
Sir Henry Elliot

Sir Henry George Elliot GCB KCMG PC (30 June 1817 – 30 March 1907) was a British diplomat. He was the second son of Gilbert Elliot-Murray-Kynynmound, 2nd Earl of Minto. He was most noted for his period as ambassador at Constantinople, and his participation in the 1876-77 Constantinople Conference. Elliot took a pro-Turkish line despite the ‘Bulgarian atrocities’. He argued in a dispatch he made on 4 September 1876 "that British interests in preventing change in the Turkish empire were 'not affected by the question whether it was 10,000 or 20,000 persons who perished in the suppression'. As a result of the unpopularity in Britain of his pragmatism in the face of atrocities he was relocated to Vienna in 1877. He died at home (Ardington House near Wantage) in 1907.

== Education ==
Elliot was educated at Eton College and then Trinity College, Cambridge. He did not take a degree.

== Early employment ==
Elliot's first proper employment was to work as the aide-de-camp and private secretary to Sir John Franklin in Tasmania. He worked there from 1836 to 1839. In 1840 he worked at the Foreign Office as a précis writer for Lord Palmerston at the Foreign Office.

== Diplomatic service ==
In 1841 Elliot entered the diplomatic service. His first posting was as an attaché at St Petersburg. This was followed first, in 1848 by a position as a secretary to the legation at The Hague then in 1853 to Vienna and then in 1858 he was appointed Minister at Copenhagen.

=== Italy ===
In 1859 he was appointed Minister in Naples. This was followed in 1863 by an appointment as Minister to the King of Italy. This lasted till 1867.

=== Istanbul ===
In 1867 he was appointed Ambassador at Constantinople.

== Matthew's judgement on Elliot ==
H. C. G. Matthews, in the concluding paragraph of Elliot's entry in the Oxford Dictionary of National Biography, notes that:

To have annoyed both Salisbury and Gladstone was unusual. Elliot, in fact, represented the accepted Foreign Office view of his day as to the need to maintain the Porte. His illiberal statements of 1876–7 should not mask his overall competence in maintaining whiggish objectives of liberal constitutionalism, at least in western Europe.

== Meyer's judgement on Elliot ==
Elliot's role as Ambassador to Constantinople was a central theme in a book and BBC Four TV programme aired 22 February 2010 written and presented by Sir Christopher Meyer, former British Ambassador to the US. Meyer examined the possibility of an ethical foreign policy. The programme argued that Elliot supported Turkey because it acted as a bulwark between Russia and the UK's interests in the middle-east and India. Elliot's critics accused him of turning "native" but he argued, and the programme lent support to this view, that there were capital considerations they had not taken into account.

Diplomatic posts
Preceded by ?	British Minister to Denmark; 1858–1859	Succeeded by Sir Augustus Paget
Preceded by ?	British Minister to the Two Sicilies; 1859–1860	Succeeded by ?
Preceded by Sir James Hudson	British Minister to Italy and the Holy See; 1863–1867	Succeeded by Sir Augustus Paget
Preceded by The Lord Lyons	British Ambassador to the Ottoman Empire; 1867–1877	Succeeded by Sir Henry Layard
Preceded by Sir Andrew Buchanan	British Ambassador to Austria; 1877–1884	Succeeded by Sir Augustus Paget
