= Charles Edward Mansfield =

British army officer and diplomat

Colonel Sir Charles Mansfield KCMG (11 October 1828 – 1 August 1907) was a British army officer and diplomat, envoy to several countries.

== Career ==
Charles Edward Mansfield joined the army in 1848 as an ensign in the 33rd Regiment of Foot. He became a lieutenant in 1831. He was aide-de-camp to Sir Colin Campbell during the Crimean War, was present at the battles of Alma and Balaclava in September and October 1854, was mentioned in despatches and promoted to captain in December 1854. He was present in the trenches at the attack and fall of Sevastopol in 1855 and was again mentioned in despatches. He was appointed aide-de-camp to his brother, William Mansfield, then a brigadier-general attached as military adviser to the British ambassador at Constantinople. William Mansfield returned to India as Chief of Staff, with Charles continuing as aide-de-camp. During the Indian Mutiny in 1857 Charles was severely wounded at the Second Battle of Cawnpore. Afterwards he was again mentioned in despatches and was made brevet major, and substantive major in June 1858.

In 1865 Charles Mansfield was appointed Consul-General at Warsaw with local rank of lieutenant-colonel. He was made permanent lieutenant-colonel in 1869. He was agent and consul-general at Bucharest 1876–78, during which he was promoted to full colonel. He was Minister Resident at Bogotá 1878–81, at Caracas 1881–84 (representing the United Kingdom at the centenary of Simón Bolívar in 1883), and at Lima from 1884 until 1894 when he retired. He was knighted KCMG in 1887.

== Publication ==
- A Latter-Day Novel, Chapman and Hall, London, 1878

Diplomatic posts
Preceded by Hussey Vivian	Agent and Consul-General in the United Principalities of Moldavia and Wallachia; 1876–1878	Succeeded by Sir William White
Preceded by Robert Bunch	Minister Resident and Consul-General to the United States of Colombia; 1878–1881	Succeeded by Augustus Mounsey
Preceded by Robert Bunch	Minister Resident to the United States of Venezuela; 1881–1884	Succeeded by Frederick St John
Preceded by Spenser St. John	Minister Resident and Consul-General to the Republic of Peru; 1884–1894	Succeeded by Henry Mitchell Jones
