= James Beethom Whitehead =

British diplomat (1858–1928)

Sir James Whitehead KCMG JP
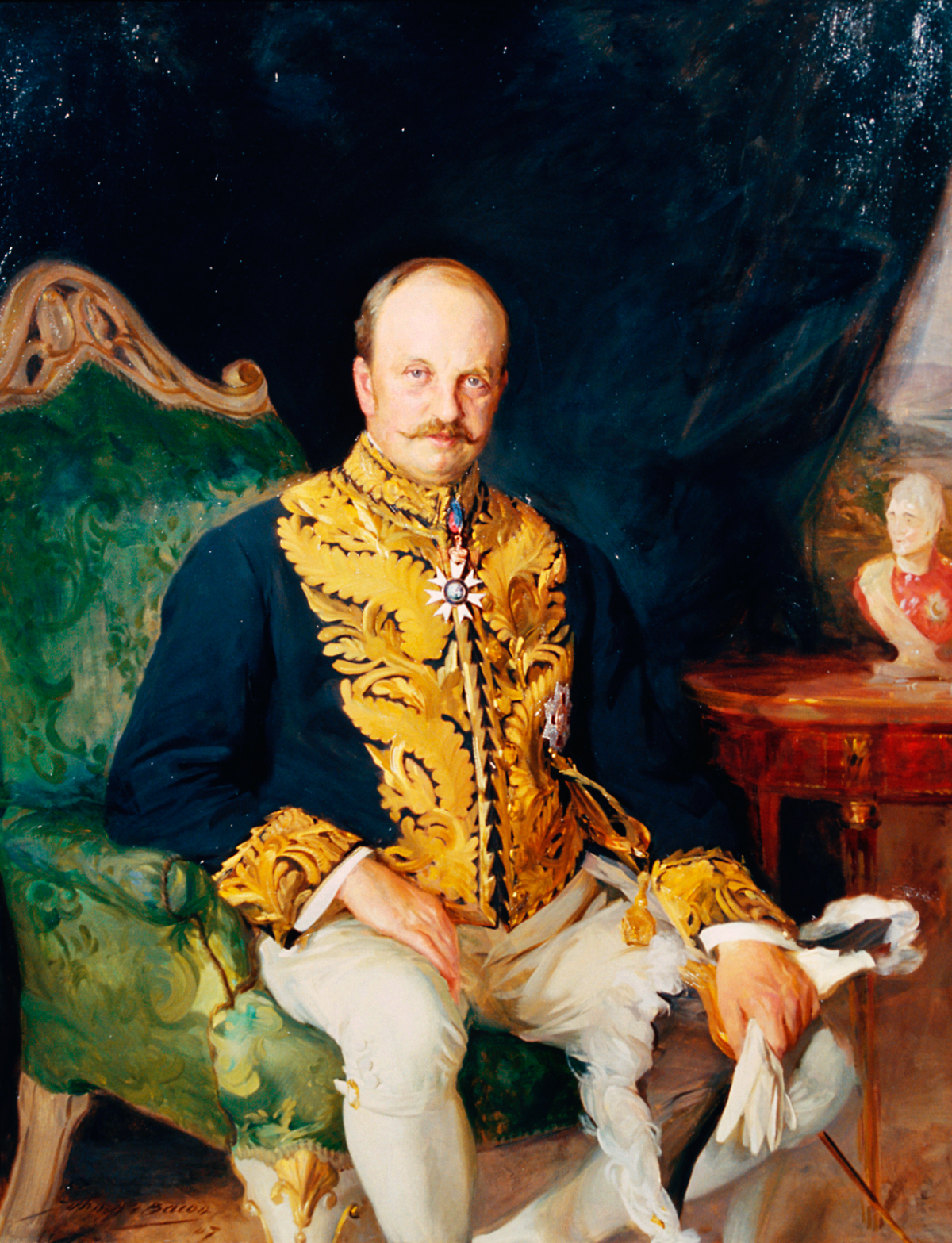
- Portrait of Whitehead by John Henry Frederick Bacon, 1907

British Minister to Serbia
- In office 1906–1910
- Preceded by: Wilfred Gilbert Thesiger (acting)
- Succeeded by: Sir Ralph Paget

Personal details
- Born: James Beethom Whitehead; 31 July 1858 Trieste, Austrian Empire
- Died: 19 September 1928 (aged 70)
- Spouse: Hon. Marian Cecilia Brodrick (m. 1896)
- Children: 7
- Parent(s): Robert Whitehead; Frances Maria Johnson
- Education: St John's College, Cambridge

Sir James Beethom Whitehead KCMG JP (31 July 1858 – 19 September 1928) was a British diplomat, who was British Minister to Serbia 1906–1910.

== Early life ==
Whitehead was the second son of the engineer Robert Whitehead (1823–1905) by his wife Frances Maria Johnson (1821–1883). His elder sister, Alice Whitehead, married Georg Anton, Count of Hoyos, and was the mother of Countess Marguerite (wife of Herbert von Bismarck, eldest son of Otto von Bismarck) and Alexander, Count of Hoyos. His elder brother, John Whitehead, was the father of Agathe Whitehead (wife of Captain Georg von Trapp and mother of seven children who were the inspiration behind the movie The Sound of Music), and his younger brother, Robert Boville Whitehead also married and had issue.

He was educated in Austria and at St John's College, Cambridge, where he earned a B.A. degree in 1881 and an M.A. degree in 1887.

== Career ==
He entered the diplomatic service in 1881, was appointed Third Secretary in November 1883, and promoted to Second Secretary on 1 January 1887. On 1 October 1898, he was appointed Secretary of Legation at Tokyo, in October 1901 he transferred as First Secretary of Legation at Brussels, and in August 1902 he was appointed Secretary at the embassy in Constantinople. While in Constantinople, he acted as Chargé d'affaires in the absence of the ambassador during early 1903, and was received by the Sultan. In December 1903, he transferred as First Secretary to the embassy in Berlin, and on 1 April 1904 he was promoted to Counselor.

He was appointed Envoy Extraordinary and Minister Plenipotentiary to the Kingdom of Serbia in June 1906, serving as such until 1910. While in this position, he was knighted as a Knight Commander of the Order of St Michael and St George (KCMG) in the 1909 Birthday Honours list in June 1909.

He was a Justice of the peace for Hampshire.

== Personal life ==
Whitehead married on 15 April 1896 the Hon. Marian Cecilia Brodrick (b.1869), youngest daughter of the William Brodrick, 8th Viscount Midleton and Hon. Augusta Fremantle (a daughter of Thomas Fremantle, 1st Baron Cottesloe). Marian's brother St John Brodrick, became the 1st Earl of Midleton Together, they lived at Efford Park, Lymington, and were the parents of:

- George Robert Beethom Whitehead (1897–1981)
- Augusta Alice Cecilia Whitehead (b. 1898)
- John William St John Whitehead (1901–1984), stockbroker and pre-WWII amateur aviator.
- Frances Edith Marian Whitehead (1903–1992), who married Sir John Paget Bowman, 4th Baronet (1904–1994)
- Sir Edgar Cuthbert Fremantle Whitehead (1905–1971), who became Prime Minister of Southern Rhodesia
- Hugh Laurence James Whitehead (1908–1945)
- Arthur Wilfred Alexander Whitehead (1911–1940)

Sir James died on 19 September 1928. His widow Lady Whitehead died 28 April 1932.

Diplomatic posts
Preceded by Wilfred Gilbert Thesiger acting	Envoy Extraordinary and Minister Plenipotentiary to His Majesty the King of Serbia; 1906-10	Succeeded by Sir Ralph Paget
