= John Hall Magowan =

British diplomat

Sir John Hall Magowan, KBE, CMG (5 October 1893 - 5 April 1951) was a British diplomat.

== Life and activity ==
Raised in Mountnorris, Co. Armagh, Magowan was the son of William Hall Magowan and his wife Sara Ann, née Irvine. After attending the Royal School, Armagh, he studied modern languages at Trinity College, Dublin, from 1911. From 1915 to 1918 he participated in World War I with the Royal Field Artillery and the Intelligence Corps. In 1917 he reached the rank of lieutenant. Until 1919 he belonged to the British occupying army on the Rhine.

In 1919, Magowan joined the British diplomatic service. He was initially appointed vice-consul in Hamburg and Bremerhaven. From 1924 to 1929, Magowan then served as consul for the Saar region and the Bavarian Palatinate, with his office in Mainz. From 1929 to 1931 he was appointed British Chargé d'Affaires and Consul in Haiti with his office in Port au Prince.

From 1931 to 1934, Magowan served as Commercial Secretary on the staff of the British Embassy in Washington, D.C. From 1935 to 1937 he was a member of the British Embassy in Berlin as Trade Secretary and then from 1937 to 1939 of the same Embassy as Commercial Counsellor. After the outbreak of the Second World War, he returned to Great Britain. Until 1940 he was employed by the British Treasury. From 1940 to 1942, he served as Deputy Comptroller General of the Export Credits Guarantee Department.

Due to his activities in Berlin, Magowan came into the sights of the National Socialist police forces at the end of the 1930s, who classified him as an important target: In the spring of 1940, the Reich Security Main Office in Berlin placed him on the G.B. special wanted list, a list of persons who, in the event of a successful invasion and occupation of the British Isles by the Wehrmacht, should be identified and arrested.

From 1942 to 1948, Magowan served as trade adviser to the British ambassador in Washington, D.C.

Magowan reached the pinnacle of his career in 1948 when he was appointed British ambassador to Venezuela. He remained in this post until his death during a home stay in Northern Ireland on 5 April 1951. Shortly before his death, he had been appointed British Ambassador to Thailand in December 1950, but died before he could present his credentials.

He was buried in Mountnorris.

== Family ==
On 22 June 1917 he married Winifred Isabel, née Titterington Ray, in Rathfarnham Church in Dublin. They had a daughter, Anna Isabel Magowan (born 20 June 1922) and two sons, William Andrew (born 5 September 1921) and David (born 16 July 1928).

== Honours ==
Magowan was appointed an Officer of the Order of the British Empire (OBE)in the 1929 Birthday Honours. He was appointed a Companion of the Order of Saint Michael and Saint George (CMG) in the 1941 Birthday Honours. He was promoted to Knight Commander of the Order of the British Empire (KBE) in the 1946 New Year Honours.

== Sources ==
Who was who: A Companion to Who's Who, Containing the Biographies of Those who Died During the Period, 1961, p. 724.

Diplomatic posts
Preceded by George Ogilvie-Forbes	British Ambassador to Cuba; 1948–1951	Succeeded by Robert Urquhart
Preceded by Geoffrey Thompson	British Ambassador to Thailand; 1951	Succeeded by Geoffrey Wallinger
