= Arthur Peel (diplomat) =

British diplomat (1861–1952)

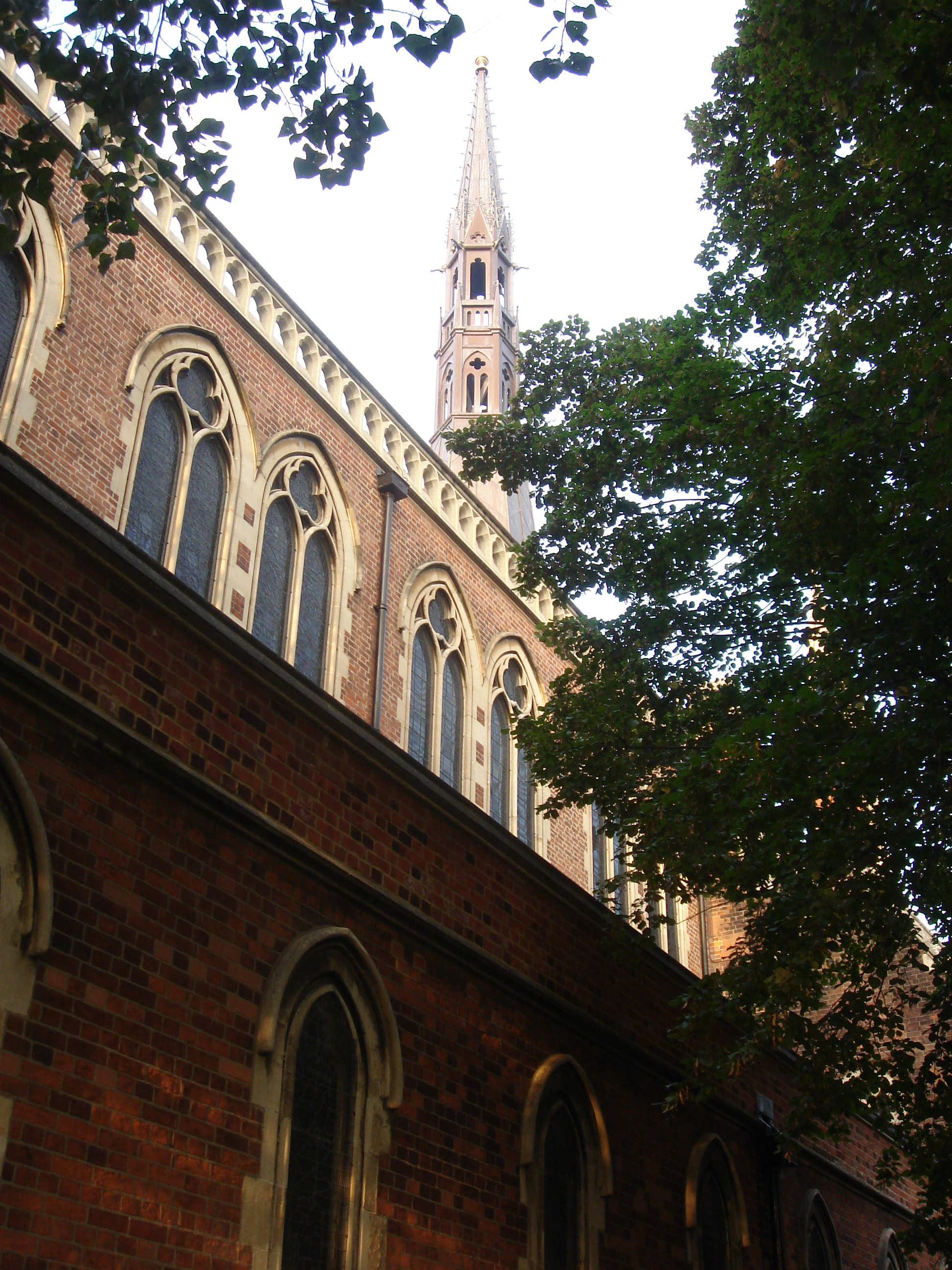
St Cuthbert's, Earls Court, where Peel married in 1921

Sir Arthur Robert Peel KCMG (15 August 1861 – 7 October 1952) was a British diplomat who was envoy to Thailand, Brazil and Bulgaria.

== Career ==
Arthur Robert Peel (grandson of William Yates Peel) was educated at Eton College and entered the Diplomatic Service as an attaché in 1886. He served in St Petersburg, Washington, D.C., Buenos Aires, The Hague, Lisbon and Montevideo, and was consul-general for the island of Crete, before being appointed Minister to Thailand (then called Siam) 1909–1915, to Brazil 1915–1918, and (after a year in London) to Bulgaria 1920–1921.

Peel was awarded a knighthood (KCMG) in 1917.

== Personal life ==
On 17 September 1921, at St Cuthbert's, Earls Court, London, Peel married Grace Landsberg, eldest daughter of Alberto Landsberg, a Brazilian banker of German Jewish ancestry.

== Offices held ==
Diplomatic posts
Preceded by Sir Ralph Paget	Envoy Extraordinary and Minister Plenipotentiary of the United Kingdom to the Kingdom of Siam; 1909–1915	Succeeded by Sir Herbert Dering
Preceded by William Haggard	Envoy Extraordinary and Minister Plenipotentiary of the United Kingdom to the Republic of the United States of Brazil; 1915–1918	Succeeded by Sir Ralph Paget as Ambassador
Vacant No representation due to the First World War Title last held by Sir Henry Bax-Ironside	Envoy Extraordinary and Minister Plenipotentiary of the United Kingdom to His Majesty the King of the Bulgarians; 1920–1921	Succeeded by Sir William Erskine

== Links ==
- PEEL, Sir Arthur, Who Was Who, A & C Black, 1920–2016 (online edition, Oxford University Press, 2014)
- Obituary – Sir Arthur Peel, The Times, London, 9 October 1952, page 8
