= Ralph Paget =

British diplomat

The Right Honourable Sir Ralph Paget KCMG CVO PC
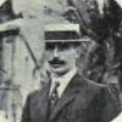
- Paget ca. 1905

1st British Ambassador to Brazil
- In office 1918–1920
- Preceded by: Mission upgraded
- Succeeded by: Sir John Tilley

British Minister to Denmark
- In office 1916–1918
- Preceded by: Sir Henry Lowther
- Succeeded by: Sir Charles Marling

British Minister to Serbia
- In office 1910–1913
- Preceded by: Sir James Whitehead
- Succeeded by: Sir Charles des Graz

British Minister to Thailand
- In office 1904–1909
- Preceded by: Sir Reginald Tower
- Succeeded by: Sir Arthur Peel

Personal details
- Born: 26 November 1864 British Embassy, Copenhagen, Denmark
- Died: 11 May 1940 (aged 75) Saint-Raphaël, France
- Spouse(s): Dame Louise Paget; no children
- Relations: Sir Augustus Paget (father); Walburga, Lady Paget, née Countess von Hohenthal (mother); General Sir Arthur Paget (father-in-law, third cousin)
- Education: Eton College
- Profession: Diplomat

Sir Ralph Spencer Paget (26 November 1864 – 11 May 1940) was a British diplomat in the Foreign Service, whose career culminated in his appointment as Ambassador to Brazil in 1918, a position he held until 1920.

== Early life and career ==
Ralph Spencer Paget was born on 26 November 1864 at the British Legation in Copenhagen, where his father Sir Augustus Paget (1823–1896) served as Minister to Denmark. His German mother Walburga, née Countess von Hohenthal (1839–1929), was a diarist, writer and an intimate friend of Queen Victoria. His great-uncle, who died ten years before his birth, was Henry Paget, 1st Marquess of Anglesey, who had led the cavalry at Waterloo, and his uncle was the distinguished naval officer Lord Clarence Paget. As the third child and second son of a senior career diplomat, Paget attended public school in England. He was educated at Eton College, where he won the Prince Consort's prize for German. He shone at rowing, being part of the winning "Novice Eight" in 1881, which also won in the Procession of Boats on 4 June of that year and later in the "House Four". After finishing school he studied abroad, becoming an "Arabic and Turkish scholar" before being nominated in April 1888 attaché in the Foreign Service and sent to Vienna to serve with his father, the Ambassador to Austria-Hungary. In the autumn of 1889 he was sent to Egypt to work with Sir Evelyn Baring, the British Agent and Consul-General, who was the de facto ruler of the country. While there he "gained an insight into the realities of administrative reform" while Baring introduced his financial reforms.

He was dispatched in 1891 to Zanzibar, recently exchanged with Heligoland, and worked with Gerald Portal (the colonial commissioner) to promote "the first beginnings of European civilisation in the East of Africa". In June, 1892 he was sent to the British mission in Washington, D.C., where he stayed for only a year. In June, 1893 he then joined the legation in Tokyo, where he served as chargé d'affaires, where he served for six years. In 1895 he was promoted to Second Secretary. He made such a good impression that upon his arrival the Japanese journal Nichi Nichi Shimbun wrote;

Mr. Paget has plenty of springs and autumns to come, the future of great promise [is] before him and [he] will certainly make himself a name as a diplomatist of mark.

At the beginning of his service in Tokyo the First Secretary was Gerard Lowther, later one of the architects of the Entente Cordiale, was considered to be acceptable neither to the Chinese or Japanese lobbies at the time of the Sino-Japanese War and there relied heavily on his subordinates, Paget included. He then served for five years under Sir Ernest Satow who took over in Tokyo.

In 1901 Paget was sent to the legation in Guatemala as chargé d'affaires, though with much increased responsibility as neighbouring Nicaragua came under his legation's jurisdiction also. The primary motivation of the diplomatic staff was economic, protecting British interests in Central America. He was kept busy, and saw varied service in the two countries. In a 1901 official visit to Nicaragua, his modesty was offended by the fact that every time he visited a town, he was greeted by brass bands playing the National Anthem. Despite his diplomatic bearing he felt compelled to ask that the practice cease. In September 1902 he was promoted and appointed chargé d'affaires at the Bangkok legation in the Kingdom of Siam.

== Sojourn in Siam ==
In Siam he was quickly put in de facto charge of the legation due to the recall of the Minister, Sir Reginald Tower. The climate was no better than Guatemala, and the Foreign Office had trouble filling the post for two years. Eventually, it was decided that after a period as First Secretary to the Legation from March, 1904 Paget would become Envoy Extraordinary and Minister Plenipotentiary in November at the age of forty.

Upon taking charge in Bangkok he tried to have the Legation (built 1876) moved to land at the Royal Bangkok Sports Club due to its nearness to the river and generally unfavourable position. However the Foreign Office and the Ministry of Works refused to allocate funds and the project was eclipsed by first Paget's own work, and after his departure by the First World War.

During his tenure he had to deal with German economic encroachment in Siam and try and negotiate a new standard in Anglo-Siamese relations. The status of British nationals in Siam had to be addressed, along with a long-running dispute over the lengthy Siamese-Malay border and the construction of a Bangkok-Singapore railway. Paget was able to deal with all of these issues and brooked no opposition either from London or Bangkok. The Anglo-Siamese Treaty of 1909 led to four tributary Siamese states coming under autonomous British control as the Unfederated Malay States, while Britain recognised Siamese control of four other states, officially demarcating a border which remains today between Thailand and Malaysia. Under the terms of the treaty, signed in March 1909, Britain undertook to build a railway between the two spheres of influence.

== Return to Europe ==
While laying the groundwork for this eventual success, in 1907 Paget married his third cousin once removed, Louise Margaret Leila Wemyss Paget (1881–1958), daughter of General Sir Arthur Paget. Later that year he was made a Commander of the Royal Victorian Order.

In 1908 he was seriously considered for the position of British Ambassador to the German Empire in succession to Frank Lascelles. Instead he was dispatched to Munich to become the Minister Resident in the Kingdom of Bavaria and the Kingdom of Württemberg, where his workload was relatively light as all major diplomatic intercourse took place at the consulate in Berlin.

In recognition of his services in Siam, Paget was promoted Knight Commander of the Order of Saint Michael and Saint George in the King's Birthday Honours for 1909 and knighted.

Despite being popular in his new position, Paget managed to alienate the Permanent Under-Secretary back in Whitehall, Sir Charles Hardinge with his "mild" reports. He would only be able to return to work at the Foreign Office in 1913, when Hardinge had been ennobled and made Viceroy of India. In July 1910, Paget was appointed Envoy Extraordinary and Minister Plenipotentiary to the Kingdom of Serbia, being succeeded in Munich by Sir Vincent Corbett.

George V wrote a letter to the Prince Regent of Bavaria personally informing him of Sir Ralph's departure from Germany. News of Paget's promotion to Minister to Serbia was announced in The Times on 5 August 1910.

== Minister in Serbia ==
Paget arrived in Serbia on 21 September 1910 and presented his credentials to King Petar three days later.

He was awarded Order of the White Eagle.

== Return to England ==
In August 1913 Paget was called back to England and appointed an Assistant Under-Secretary of State for Foreign Affairs in succession to Sir Louis Mallet. He was placed in charge of the FO American Department, where during the first two years of the Great War he worked on establishing and improving the British economic blockade of the Central Powers. This work put him firmly on track for promotion to an ambassadorship when the British Government sought to improve its blockading efforts in the European neutrals in 1916.

== Denmark ==
In 1916 Paget returned to his birthplace, when he replaced Sir Henry Lowther as the British ambassador to Denmark. In 1916 and 17 he was deeply involved in trade negotiations with the Danish government, working closely with the wartime British Ministry of Blockade. Yet following US entry into the war the American embassy took up many of these duties and Paget became thoroughly bored with Copenhagen. He also disliked the Scandinavian winter climate intensely, and when an opportunity to take up the ambassadorship to Brazil presented itself in the summer of 1918 he eagerly took it.

== Brazil ==
On 26 September 1918 it was announced that the Legation in Rio de Janeiro was being upgraded to an Embassy and that Paget had been approved by the King to be the first Ambassador Extraordinary and Plenipotentiary to Brazil. His departure was delayed however by being a permanent official of the British delegation to the Paris Peace Conference with responsibility for the Balkans. Most of the salient points of the Paget-Tyrrell Memorandum for the distribution of Central and Eastern Europe were eventually adopted. On 18 August 1919 he was sworn a member of the Privy Council before finally taking up his appointment in Brazil. He arrived in Rio in style, having travelled from the West Indies, where he had "been employed on a special mission", in the battle cruiser HMS Renown, arriving on 2 October. On 8 October he was officially received by President Pessoa.

He spent only a year in Brazil, despite being a success there, being awarded the honorary presidency of the British Chamber of Commerce in Brazil. Before he had been appointed to the post, he had written to a friend; "What I really long for in my innermost heart is an old cotton shirt, an old pair of pants, a good horse and open prairie or desert." In conversation with Sir John Tilley, who at the time Assistant Secretary at the Foreign Office, he was reminded that his ultimate ambition had been to become an ambassador. He responded that the goal was fulfilled as soon as the appointment was made. Paget's plan to increase British immigration in Brazil was thwarted by the Overseas Settlement Office. Eventually recurring bad health and a bout of depression forced him to tender his resignation in August 1920.

== Retirement ==
After 1920, Sir Ralph Paget lived a further 20 years in the obscurity of private life. When in October 1934 the Yugoslav King Aleksandar I was assassinated, Lady Paget visited Belgrade and was present at his funeral. Sir Ralph died on 10 May 1940 while in Saint-Raphaël, France. His widow, Dame Louise Paget, continued her active interest in the Balkans. With the German invasion of Yugoslavia and the influx of Yugoslavian exiles into Britain, she did all she could to assist those in need, including selling her estate in Surrey. She died at Kingston upon Thames on 24 September 1958.

== Citations ==
Diplomatic posts
Preceded by Sir Reginald Tower	Envoy Extraordinary and Minister Plenipotentiary of the United Kingdom to the Kingdom of Siam; 1904–1909	Succeeded by Sir Arthur Peel
Preceded by Fairfax Cartwright	British Minister Resident to Bavaria and Württemberg; 1909–1910	Succeeded by Sir Vincent Corbett
Preceded by Sir James Whitehead	Envoy Extraordinary and Minister Plenipotentiary of the United Kingdom to the Kingdom of Serbia; 1910–1913	Succeeded by Sir Charles des Graz
Preceded by Sir Henry Lowther	Envoy Extraordinary and Minister Plenipotentiary of the United Kingdom to the Kingdom of Denmark; 1916–1918	Succeeded by Sir Charles Marling
Preceded by Sir Arthur Peel as Envoy Extraordinary and Minister Plenipotentiary	Ambassador of the United Kingdom to the Republic of the United States of Brazil; 1918–1920	Succeeded by Sir John Tilley
