= Walburga, Lady Paget =

German diarist, writer and friend of Queen Victoria (1839–1929)

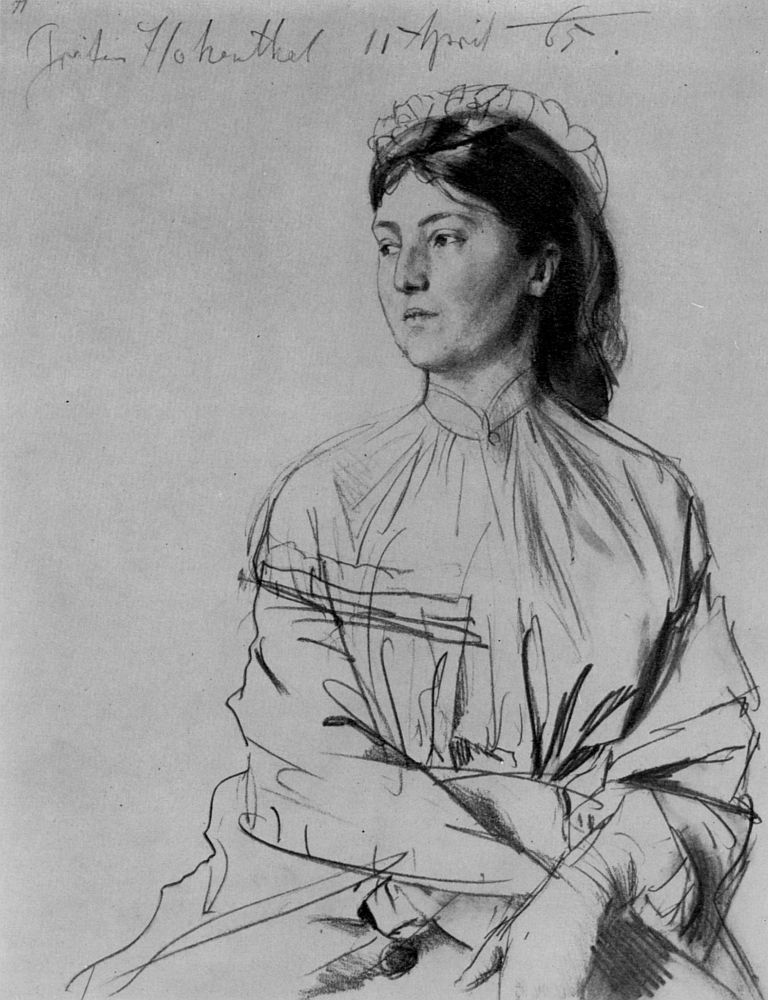
- Portrait of Walburga by Adolph von Menzel
- Known for: Lady-in-waiting to Queen Victoria
- Born: Walburga Ehrengarde Helena, Countess von Hohenthal; 3 May 1839; Berlin
- Died: 11 October 1929 (aged 90); Newnham on Severn
- Spouse: Sir Augustus Berkeley Paget (m. 1860; died 1896)

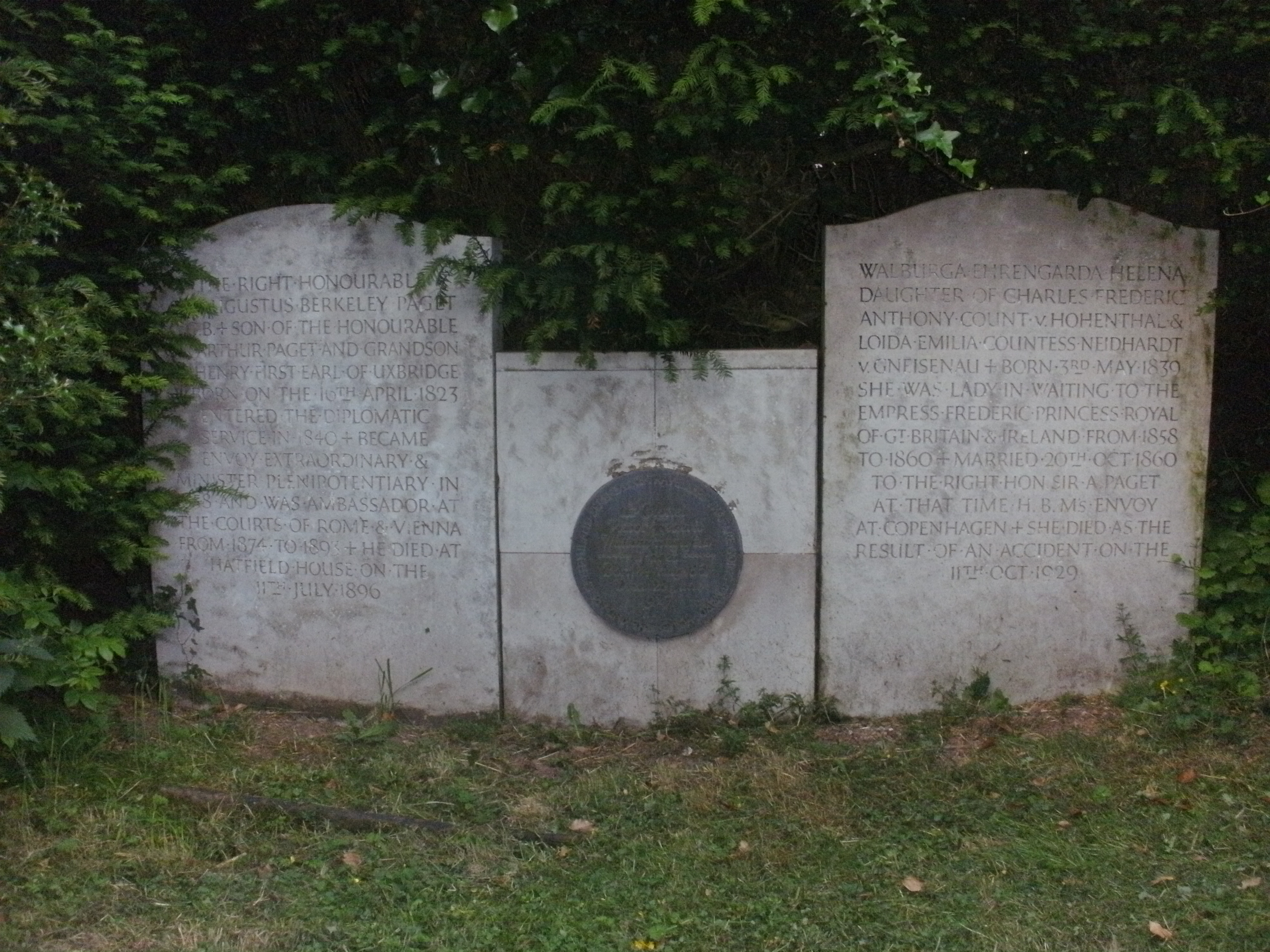
Paget family plot in the cemetery of St Bartholomew's church, Tardebigge, Worcestershire, with the graves of Sir Augustus Berkeley Paget, GCB (1823 – 1896) and his wife Walburga Ehrengarde Helena (née Countess von Hohenthal, 1839 – 1929)

Walburga Ehrengarde Helena, Lady Paget (née Gräfin von Hohenthal; 3 May 1839 – 11 October 1929) was a German noblewoman, writer, socialite, occultist, lady in waiting and intimate friend of Queen Victoria.

== Biography ==
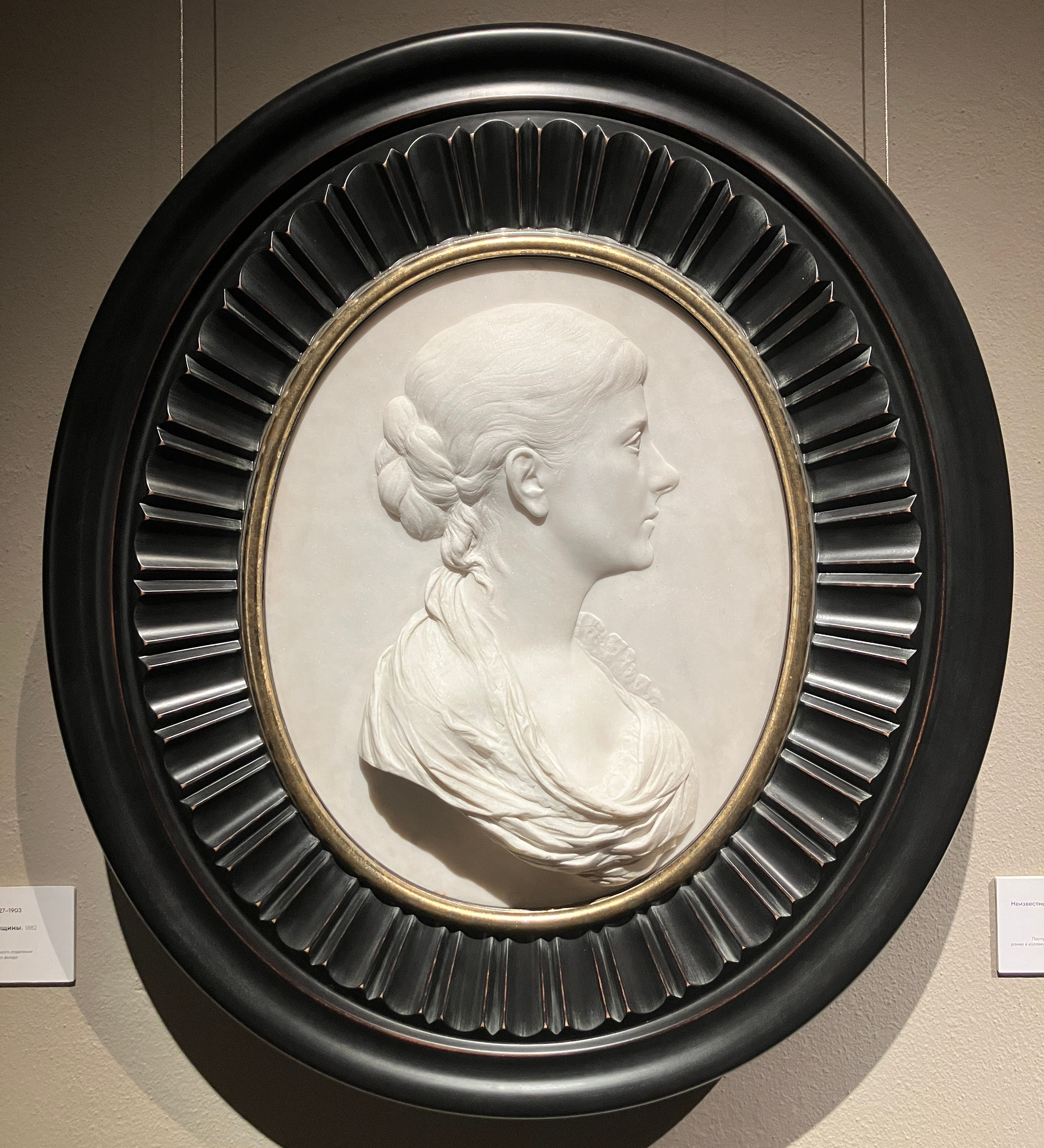
Portrait of a daughter, Alberta Victoria Sarah Caroline Paget by Joseph von Kopf. 1882. Museum named after M. A. Vrubel

Countess Walburga Ehrengarde Helena von Hohenthal was born in 1839 in Berlin, Germany. Member of the German noble House of Hohenthal, she was the daughter of Count Karl Friedrich Anton von Hohenthal and his second wife, Countess Emilie Neidhart von Gneisenau, granddaughter of Count August Neidhardt von Gneisenau. Before her marriage she was a lady-in-waiting to Victoria, Crown Princess of Prussia.

In 1860, she married Sir Augustus Berkeley Paget (1823–1896), member of the Paget family, British ambassador in Copenhagen, and later British Ambassador in Vienna, Portugal, Florence and Rome. After her husband's posting to Copenhagen, Lady Paget helped Queen Victoria to arrange the marriage of the Prince of Wales, afterwards Edward VII, to Princess Alexandra of Denmark. The Pagets had three children, two sons and one daughter:

- Victor Frederick William Augustus Paget (1861–1927), a Lieutenant Colonel
- Alberta Victoria Sarah Caroline Paget (1863–1944), married Robert Windsor-Clive, 1st Earl of Plymouth, GBE, CB, PC (1857–1923)
- Sir Ralph Paget, KCMG, CVO, PC (1864–1940), British diplomat in the Foreign Service and British Ambassador to Brazil in 1918, a position he held until 1920.

In 1867, her husband was posted to Florence, then the capital of the newly formed Italy. In 1870, when Rome became the capital, she arranged for the British embassy to be established at the Villa Torlonia. In 1884 she and her husband had to move to Vienna. In 1887, Lady Paget rented the Villa Caprini in Fiesole, Florence; and in 1893, when her husband retired to Britain, she bought the Torre di Bellosguardo south of the city. When her husband died in 1897 she kept Bellosguardo as her main residence, devoting her time to campaigning – with Vernon Lee, Augustus Hare and others – against the destruction of parts of old Florence by the Municipality, and developing her house and gardens. Queen Victoria visited her in 1893.

In 1913, amid rumors of war, Lady Paget returned to Britain. Bellosguardo was bought by an Austrian, baroness Marion von Hornstein.

In 1924, Lady Paget praised publicly Benito Mussolini's so-called 'wonderful revival of Italy. She claimed that she felt a 'great force coming' during the Great War, that a 'real Rinascimento' was arriving thanks to Mussolini who she felt rescued Italy from 'Communism, Anarchy, and Bolshevism'.

In 1929, at the age of ninety, she died of burns after falling asleep by the fire at Unlawater House, Newnham on Severn and was buried next to her husband at Tardebigge, Worcestershire.

== Vegetarianism ==
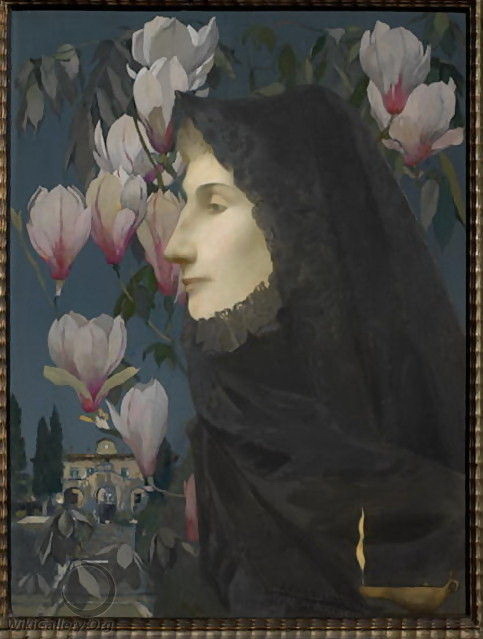
Portrait of Lady Paget by James Kerr-Lawson (1862–1939), Montreal Museum of Fine Arts

Lady Paget was a vegetarian. She authored the article "Vegetable Diet" in Nineteenth Century magazine in 1892. It was republished by The Popular Science Monthly in 1893. She explained her reasons as follows:

I strongly condemn the practice, and do not eat flesh-food myself. Two or three years ago I had occasion to read up certain papers about the transport of cattle and slaughter-houses, and as I read the irresistible conviction came upon me that I must choose between giving up the eating of animal food and my peace of mind. These considerations were not the only ones that moved me. I do not think that anyone has a right to indulge in tastes which oblige others to follow a brutalizing and degrading occupation. When you call a man a butcher, it signifies that he is fond of bloodshed. Butchers often become murderers, and I have known cases where butchers have actually been hired to murder persons whom they did not even know... I was almost fully persuaded that the vegetable diet was the most healthful in every way, and my experience has proved it to be so.

However, Paget did consume eggs and fish so she was not a strict vegetarian. She also disagreed with the temperance movement as she took a glass of wine at dinner. In regard to her diet, Paget commented that "I have experienced a delightful sense of repose and freedom, a kind of superior elevation above things material." Lady Paget served as vice-president of the London Vegetarian Society. She was a vice-president of the World League Against Vivisection and for the Protection of Animals. She attended the Fourth Triennial International Congress of the World League Against Vivisection held at Caxton Hall in 1909.

Mary Pope's vegetarian cookbook Novel Dishes for Vegetarian Households was dedicated to Paget. In 1893, Paget's chef made one or two meals from the cookbook a day for her. She commented that "I have found them quite exquisite, so much as that even meat-eaters prefer them to their usual fare".

== Selected publications ==
Her published works, mostly memoirs of her life and experiences, include:

- Vegetable Diet (1892, republished in 1893)
- Colloquies with an Unseen Friend (co-written with Roma Lister in 1907)
- Scenes and Memories (1912)
- Embassies of Other Days (1923)
- In My Tower (1924)
- The Linings of Life (1929)
