= Patrick Hancock =

British diplomat (1914–1980)

Sir Patrick Francis Hancock GCMG (25 June 1914 – 1 February 1980) was a British diplomat who was ambassador to Israel, Norway and Italy.

== Career ==
Patrick Francis Hancock was educated at Winchester College and Trinity College, Cambridge. He joined the Diplomatic Service in 1937 and was appointed Third Secretary in the Foreign Office. On 10 January 1940, he was transferred to the British embassy in The Hague, but was recalled on 14 May following the German invasion of the Netherlands. Upon Hancock's return to London, he was seconded to the Ministry of Economic Warfare as Private Secretary to the Minister, Hugh Dalton. According to John Colville's diaries, Hancock found Dalton 'brilliant but unlovable'. He returned to the Foreign Office on 12 January 1942 and was promoted to Second Secretary in October of the same year. On 28 May 1943 Hancock was transferred to the Baghdad embassy and remained there until 16 July 1945, when he was recalled to London.

In November 1948 Hancock was sent to the Brussels embassy and became chargé d'affaires there in 1949. He was recalled to the Foreign Office on 9 July 1951, and on 16 May 1953 was made Head of the Central Department. He was appointed private secretary to the Foreign Secretary on 1 September 1955, and remained in this post until 15 October 1956, when he was appointed Head of the Western Department.

Hancock was ambassador to Israel 1959–62, and then to Norway 1963–65. In 1965 he was transferred back to London and promoted to Assistant Under-Secretary of the Foreign Office, and then promoted again in 1968 to Deputy Under-Secretary. Following this, Hancock was sent to Rome and served as ambassador to Italy 1969–74.

== Later and private life ==
Hancock retired from the Diplomatic Service in 1974 and was secretary of the Pilgrim Trust from 1975 until his death.

Hancock married Beatrice Mangeot (née Huckell) in 1947. They had one son and one daughter.

== Honours ==
Hancock was appointed CMG in 1956, knighted KCMG in 1969 and raised to GCMG in 1974 on his retirement.

== Notes ==
- HANCOCK, Sir Patrick, Who Was Who, A & C Black, 1920–2008; online edn, Oxford University Press, Dec 2012
- Sir Patrick Hancock (obituary), The Times, London, 2 February 1980, page 14

Diplomatic posts
Preceded by Sir Anthony Rumbold	Principal Private Secretary to the Foreign Secretary; 1955–1956	Succeeded by Sir Denis Laskey
Preceded by Sir Francis Rundall	Ambassador Extraordinary and Plenipotentiary at Tel Aviv; 1959–1962	Succeeded by John Beith
Preceded by Sir John Walker	Ambassador Extraordinary and Plenipotentiary at Oslo; 1963–1965	Succeeded by Sir Ian Scott
Preceded by Sir Evelyn Shuckburgh	Ambassador Extraordinary and Plenipotentiary at Rome; 1969–1974	Succeeded by Sir Guy Millard
