= Arthur Fagan (cricketer) =

Australian cricketer

Personal information
- Born: 24 April 1931 (age 95); New South Wales, Australia
- Source: ESPNcricinfo, 28 December 2016

Arthur Fagan (born 24 April 1931) is an Australian former cricketer. He played four first-class matches for New South Wales between 1953/54 and 1956/57. He also played for Balmain Cricket Club.

== See also ==
- List of New South Wales representative cricketers
