= George Fagan =

Irish rugby union player

- Full name: George Lawtie St Leger Fagan
- Born: 27 November 1858 Bengal, British India
- Died: 13 August 1885 (aged 26) Calcutta, British India

Rugby union career
- Position: Halfback
International career
| Years | Team | Apps | (Points) |
| 1878 | Ireland | 1 | (0) |

George Lawtie St Leger Fagan (27 November 1858 — 13 August 1885) was an Irish international rugby union player.

Born in Bengal, British India, Fagan was a son of the chief judge of the Calcutta Court of Small Causes and undertook his schooling at Rugby School in England.

Fagan was capped for Ireland in a match against England at Lansdowne Road in 1878, as a halfback partner to Thomas Gisborne Gordon, another ex-Rugby School pupil.

A barrister, Fagan was called to the Calcutta bar in 1882. He died of an illness in 1885, only days after his appointment as an interim judge to the same court his father had occupied.

Fagan's youngest brother Arthur was an England international in 1887.

== See also ==
- List of Ireland national rugby union players
