= Henry George Elliot =

Maj. Sir Henry George Elliot KCMG (25 December 1826 Niagara Falls, Ontario – 29 November 1912 Pietermaritzburg), was a Canadian-born soldier and administrator, and Chief Magistrate of the Tembuland territories in South Africa from 1891 to 1902. He was a son of Maj. J. F. Elliot.

Elliot was trained at Windsor, Ontario, and enlisted with the Royal Marine Light Infantry in 1847. He took part in the Crimean War between 1854 and 1856, including Sebastopol and Balaclava, distinguishing himself and being decorated by both the British and Turkish forces (5th class Order of the Medjidie). In 1865 he married the daughter of a Mr. J. Drummond. Then followed by a military career in England, ending in December 1869 with his resigning while holding the rank of major.

Poor health resulted in his settling in Natal in 1870, and soon after joining the crowds flocking to the diamond fields at Kimberley. His health recovered, Elliot was persuaded in 1877 by the Prime Minister John Molteno to stay on in South Africa as chief magistrate or resident commissioner of Tembuland. In 1879 his second marriage was to a daughter of a Mr. W. Gardner.

In the 1880s Elliot acquired from the Pondo chief rights over some land at the mouth of the Umzimvubu River. Traders soon settled there and coasters were able to steam some 18 km up the river to load cargoes of maize. The town later became known as Port St. Johns.

Elliot's greatest achievement was his 1904 bringing about of the bloodless annexation of Pondoland, which was the last independent territory in South Africa. Cecil Rhodes was Premier of the Cape Colony at that time, and when Britain determined to extend Colonial rule to the Pondos, Lord Loch was of a mind that an armed force was needed. This could well have led to a widespread war, and Rhodes suggested Major Elliot as the man whose diplomatic skills might avert such a disaster. The respect he earned from all parties that were involved in disputes led to his highly successful career in the civil service. He was awarded the CMG in 1879, KCMG in 1899 and CB in 1900. In 1902 he retired to Pietermaritzburg.

During the Boer War a skirmish on 20 November 1901 at the mission station of Gatberg, now Ugie, Eastern Cape, led to the death of Captain Herbert Elliot, son of Henry George Elliot.

The towns of Elliot, Eastern Cape and Elliotdale were named in honour of Henry George Elliot, as was the Sir Henry Elliot Hospital in Umtata.
