= Hohenthal =

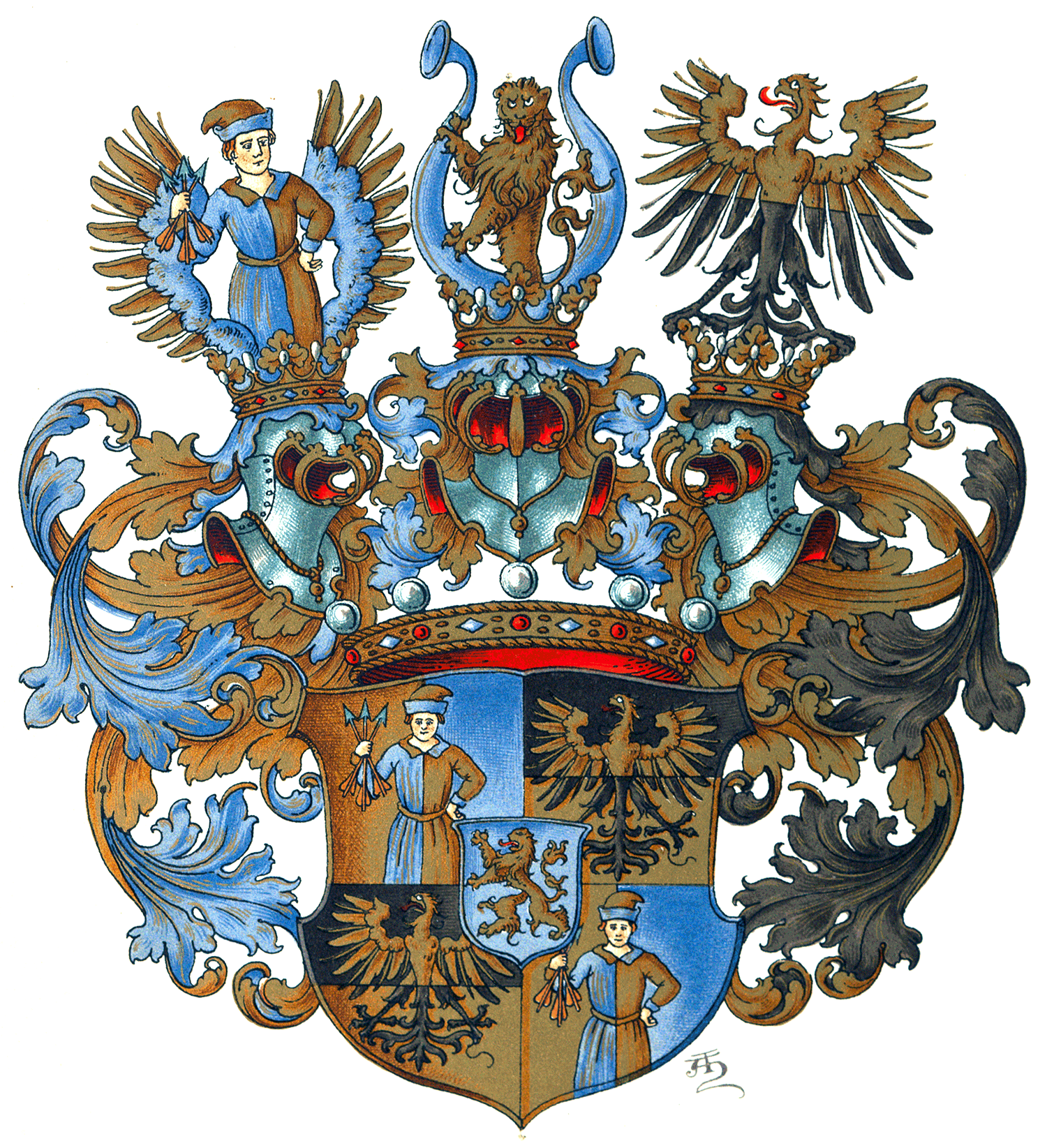
Coat of Arms of the Counts von Hohenthal

The Hohenthal family is a noted German noble family hailing from Könnern, Saxony-Anhalt. There were two lines of the family, an elder and a younger one. Members of the elder line family held the title of Imperial Count, awarded to them on 7 August 1790 by Frederick Augustus I of Saxony, as the Vicar of the Holy Roman Empire. They went extinct in 1860, while the younger, baronial branch survived until today. Hohenthal is also a German surname, meaning high valley.

== Notable people ==
- Karl Hohenthal, one of the pseudonyms of Karl May
- Peter Hohmann, Edler von Hohenthal, town Councillor in Leipzig
- Walburga Gräfin von Hohenthal, a German writer, occultist and intimate friend of Queen Victoria.
