= Mary Pope (vegetarian) =

English cookery teacher and writer (1843–after 1911)

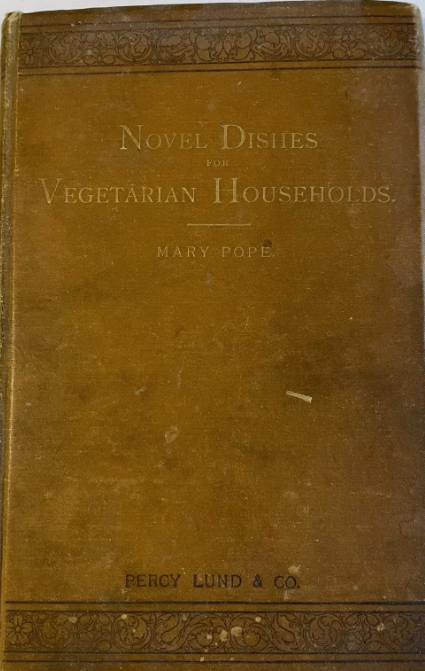
- Cover of Novel Dishes for Vegetarian Households (1893)
- Born: Mary Ann Pope; 1843; Weymouth, Dorset, England
- Died: After 2 April 1911
- Occupations: Cookery teacher; writer; activist
- Organizations: Theosophical Society; Vegetarian Society (cookery teacher)
- Notable work: Novel Dishes for Vegetarian Households (1893); Vegetarian Savouries (1904)

Mary Ann Pope (1843 – after 2 April 1911) was an English cookery teacher, writer, and activist associated with the Vegetarian Society. She served as the society's cookery teacher and wrote the vegetarian cookbooks Novel Dishes for Vegetarian Households (1893) and Vegetarian Savouries (1904). She also wrote articles and gave lectures on vegetarian cookery. Pope was a member of the Theosophical Society until 1909, co-founded its West London Lodge, and published two lodge addresses as Mysticism (1908).

== Biography ==
=== Early life ===
Mary Ann Pope was born in Weymouth, Dorset, in the second quarter of 1843. By 1861, she was working as a governess in Canford Magna, Dorset, and by 1871 she held a similar position in Midgley, Yorkshire.

=== Religious and commercial activities ===
In 1891, Pope was living in Bradford with her friend and fellow Theosophist Edith Ward. Pope was a member of the Athene Lodge of the Theosophical Society, and, with Annie Besant, sponsored Ward's membership in the society. Pope and Ward worked as outfitters at Ward's father's company, which specialised in dress reform clothing.

In Bradford, Pope sold seasonings, food colourings, and grinders, which she stocked at a local warehouse.

In 1896, Pope and Ward moved to London. They co-founded the West London Lodge of the Theosophical Society and hosted its meetings at their home for the next decade. In 1908, Pope published Mysticism: Two Addresses Given to the West London Lodge of the Theosophical Society. In 1909, Pope and Ward resigned from the Society in connection with the Leadbeater crisis.

=== Vegetarian cookery and advocacy ===
After Pope and her family became vegetarian, she served as cookery teacher to the Vegetarian Society. She argued that poorly prepared meals could discourage people from adopting vegetarianism and wrote against the view that vegetarian food lacked flavour.

Pope wrote a series of articles on vegetarianism for Isabella Reaney's Mothers & Daughters. Around 1895, she lectured on vegetarian cookery in Lancashire. In the same year, she supervised the menu for a vegetarian restaurant in Halifax, West Yorkshire.

==== Novel Dishes for Vegetarian Households ====
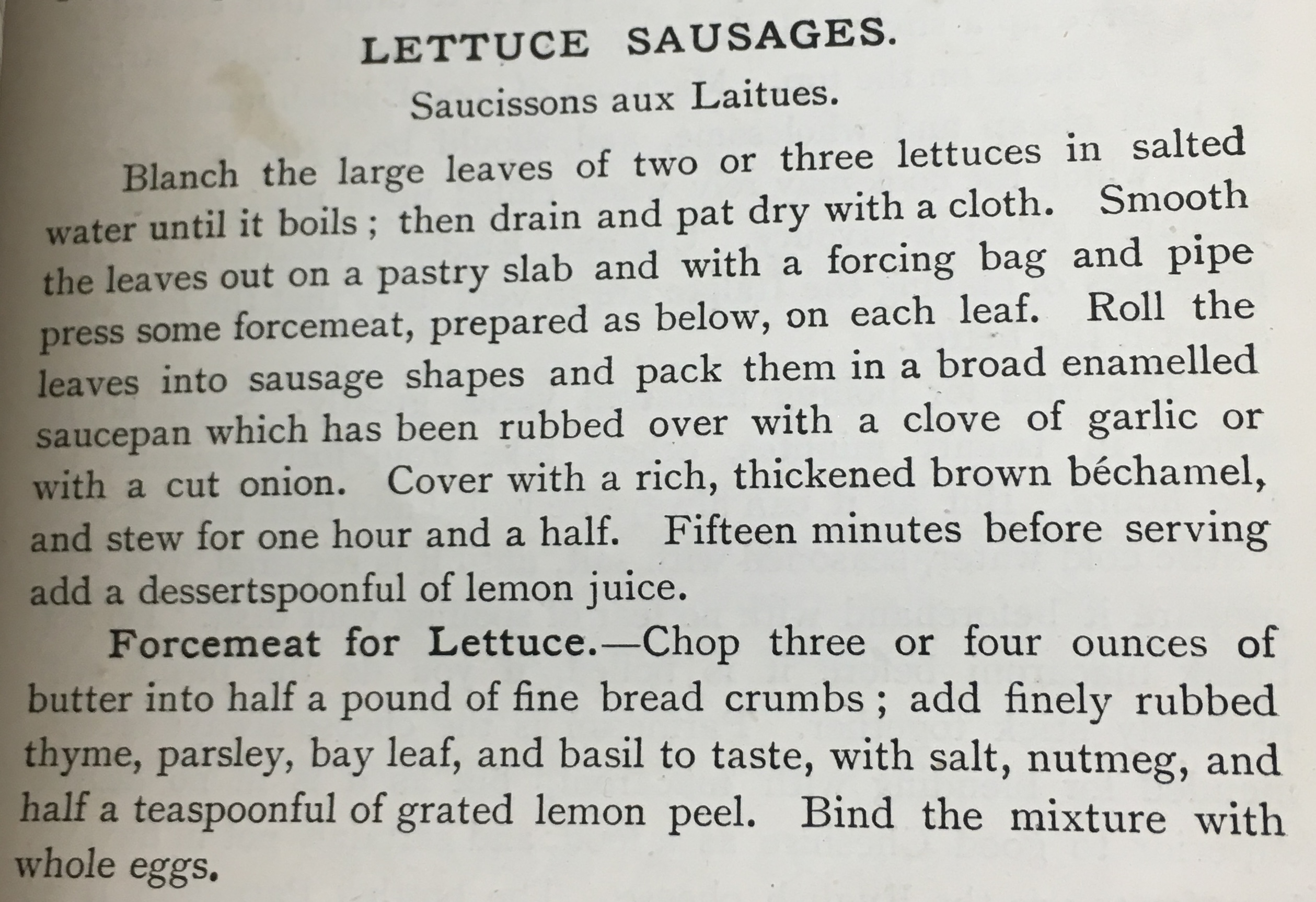
"Lettuce Sausages" recipe from Novel Dishes for Vegetarian Households (1893)

Pope's 1893 cookbook, Novel Dishes for Vegetarian Households: A Complete and Trustworthy Guide to Vegetarian Cookery, includes savoury dishes such as artichokes au gratin, aubergine fritters, maize curry, lentil fritters, endive with poached eggs, and asparagus loaves. It also contains recipes for soups and for savoury and sweet sandwiches. The book was dedicated to Lady Paget, whose comments Pope credited as prompting the work.

Pope gives guidance on the use of pulse foods, cautioning against excessive consumption because of their high nitrogen content and describing them as best suited to very active people. She also recommends moderation in soft foods that require little mastication. The book recommends uncooked fruit at all meals, especially breakfast, while giving alternatives for readers who did not follow that advice. Pope defended salads as healthy and refreshing, noting England's tradition of salads and good-quality vegetables while stating that English cooks were not especially skilled in preparing them.

Pope stated that vegetarian cookery was still developing, writing that "out of 110,000 species of flowering plants—to take no account of cryptogamic vegetation—we do not utilise more than one percent for food."

A review in Lucifer described the book as useful to vegetarians, noting Pope's practical experience of cookery and singling out the soup and sandwich sections. The Animal's Defender and Zoophilist stated that the book gave clear instructions and a wide range of recipes.

==== Vegetarian Savouries ====
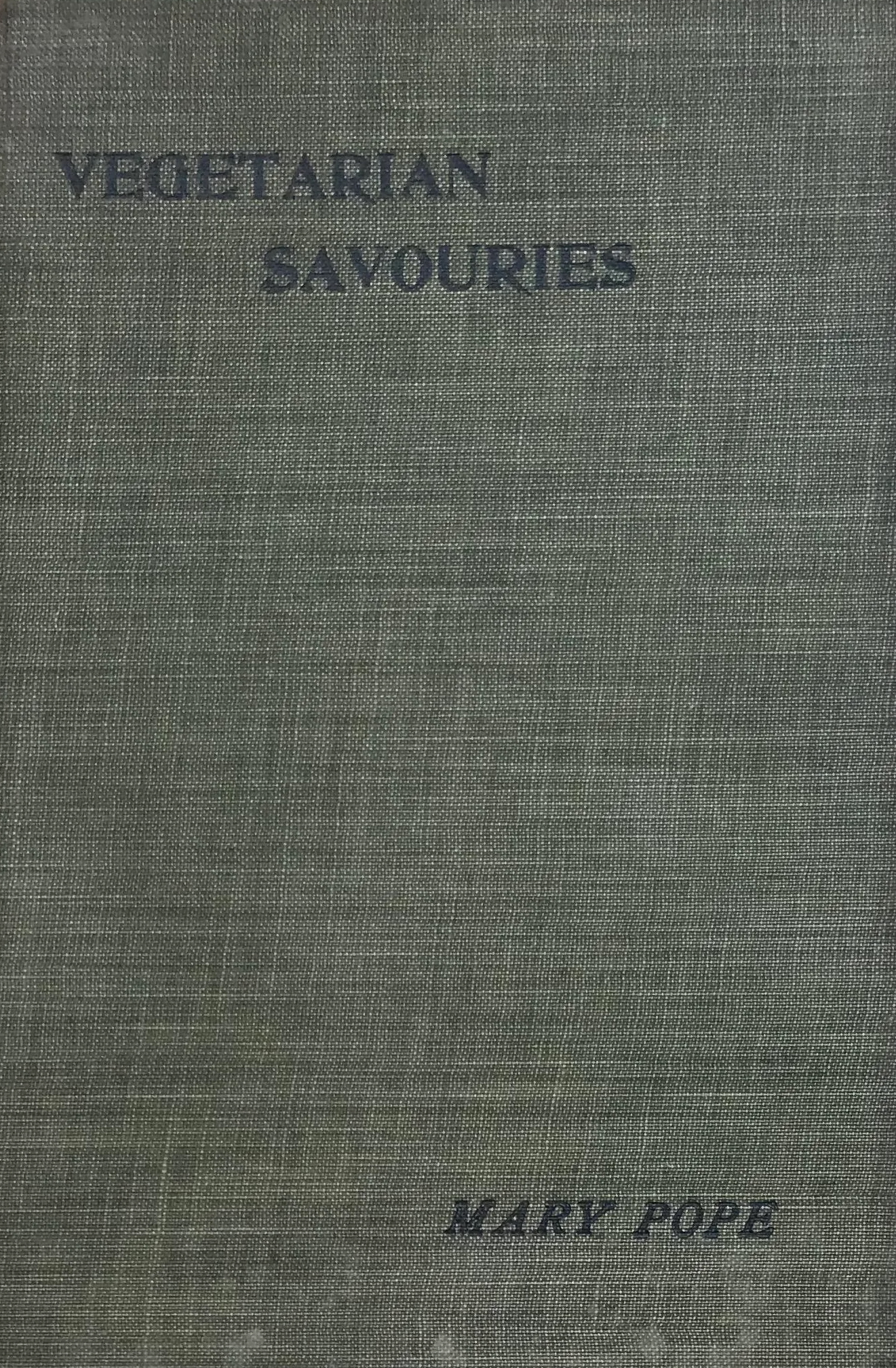
Cover of Vegetarian Savouries (1904)

In 1904, Pope published Vegetarian Savouries, with a foreword by Lady Paget. The 79-page book contains vegetarian savoury recipes, ranging from "Gravy for Stock" made with lentils to "Plasmon Butterflies". In her introduction, Pope wrote:

I have chiefly endeavored to meet the requirements of those who, being wishful to give up flesh eating, are at a loss how to replace the savory meat entrees to which they have been accustomed. Some people have no trouble in making so radical a change of diet; others encounter many difficulties.

The book cites analyses by European chemists, including Fresenius, Church, and Wolff, comparing the nitrogen content of vegetables and meats. These comparisons are used to support Pope's argument that foods such as beans, lentils, and peas could replace meat in the diet.

The New York Times described the book as stressing the practical side of vegetarianism and its suitability for refined dining, reporting that the preface presented vegetarian dishes as varied, flavourful, simple, and inexpensive to prepare. The Theosophical Review noted Pope's skill in devising savoury dishes and advised new vegetarians to use the recipes carefully, especially if they had limited cooking experience.

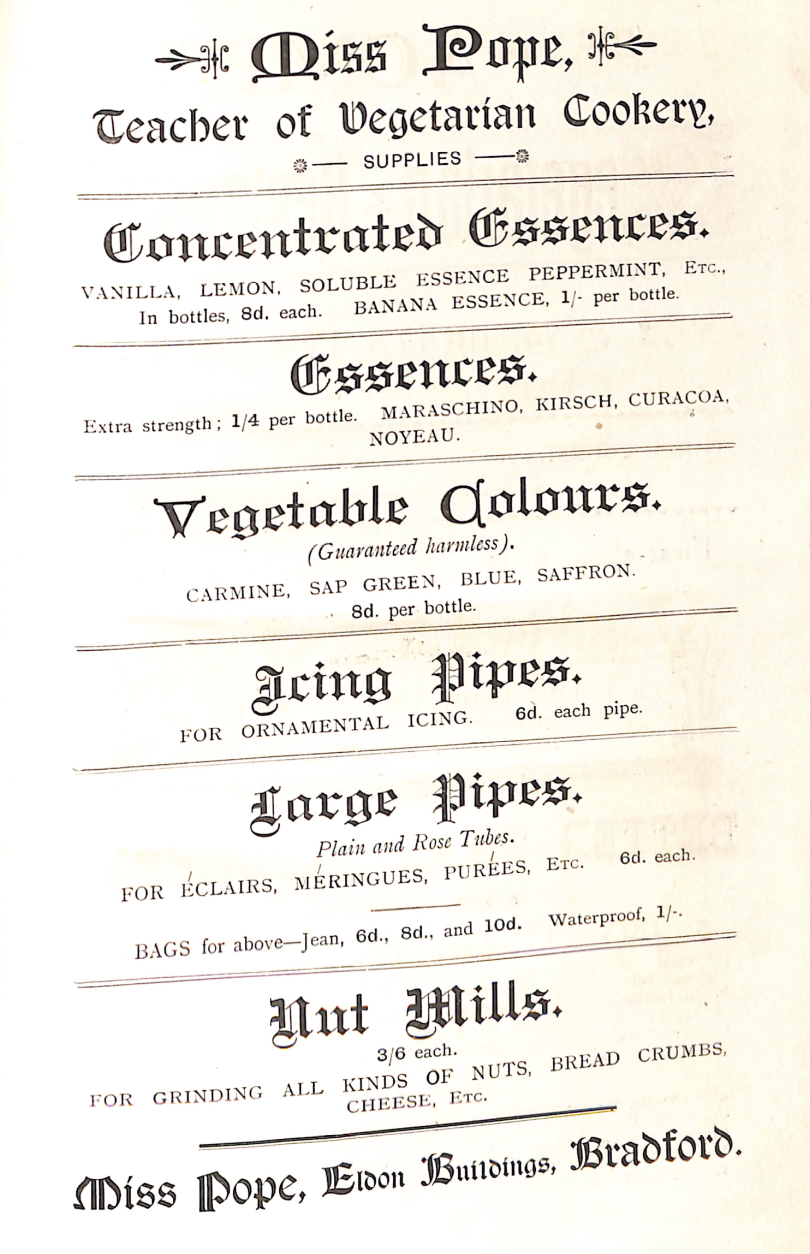
1893 advertisement for Pope's supplies

=== Later life ===
According to the 1911 United Kingdom census, conducted on 2 April 1911, Pope was retired and living in Broadstairs, Kent.

== Legacy ==
Recipes by Pope were included in Anne O'Connell's Early Vegetarian Recipes, a collection on the history of vegetarian recipes. In 2019, a copy of Novel Dishes for Vegetarian Households was donated by William Russel Buck to the LuEsther T. Mertz Library. Another copy has been digitised by Southern Adventist University as part of its Domestic Science and Cookery Collection.

== Publications ==
- Novel Dishes for Vegetarian Households: A Complete and Trustworthy Guide to Vegetarian Cookery (Bradford; London: Percy Lund, 1893)
- "The Physical Basis of Mind" (PDF). The Theosophical Review. 31 (181): 87–92, 162–173. 15 September 1902.
- Vegetarian Savouries (London: Theosophical Publishing Society, 1904)
- Mysticism: Two Addresses Given to the West London Lodge of the Theosophical Society (London: Theosophical Publishing Society, 1908)

== See also ==
- History of vegetarianism
- Women and vegetarianism and veganism advocacy
- Women in the Victorian era
- Vegetarianism in the United Kingdom
- Vegetarianism in the Victorian era
