= Henry Mitchell Jones =

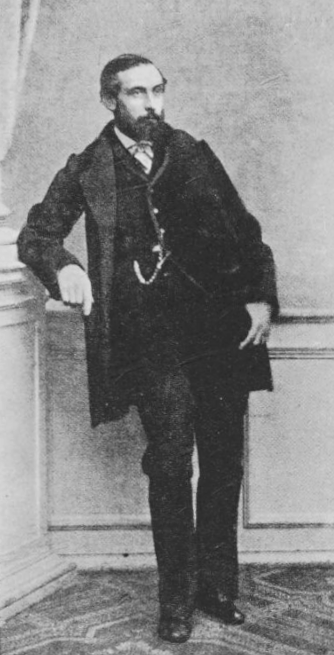
- Born: 11 February 1831; Crumlin, Dublin, Ireland
- Died: 18 December 1916 (aged 85); Eastbourne, Sussex, England
- Burial place: Ocklynge Old Cemetery, Eastbourne
- Military career
- Allegiance: United Kingdom
- Branch: British Army
- Service years: 1849–1857
- Rank: Captain
- Units: 60th Rifles; 18th Regiment of Foot; 7th Regiment of Foot
- Conflicts: Crimean War
- Awards: Victoria Cross; Legion d'honneur (France)
- Other work: Consul General

Henry Mitchell Jones VC, also known as Henry Michael Jones (11 February 1831 – 18 December 1916) was an Irish recipient of the Victoria Cross, the highest and most prestigious award for gallantry in the face of the enemy that can be awarded to British and Commonwealth forces. In later life he was a British diplomat.

Jones was born in Dublin. He entered the army as an ensign in 1849 and exchanged to the 7th Regiment of Foot (later the Royal Fusiliers) in 1854 during the Crimean War. As a lieutenant at the Battle of the Alma on 20 September 1854, whilst carrying the Queen's Colour he was severely wounded by gunshot through the lower jaw. He carried the bullet in his jaw for thirty years until he complained of a toothache. He saw a doctor who removed the bullet which had been lodged in his jawbone.

Jones was promoted to captain in 1855 and was awarded the VC "for having distinguished himself, while serving with the party which stormed and took the Quarries, before Sebastopol, by repeatedly leading on his men to repel the continual assaults of the enemy during the night. Although wounded early in the evening, Captain Jones remained unflinchingly at his post until after daylight the following morning." This took place on 7 June 1855, during the Siege of Sebastopol, but Jones' Victoria Cross was not gazetted (formally announced) until September 1857.

Jones resigned his commission three months prior to the notification of the award of his Victoria Cross, and entered the Diplomatic Service. He was appointed Consul in the Fiji and Tonga Islands 1863, Consul-General at Tabreez 1868, at Christiania 1875, and at Philippopolis (now Plovdiv) 1880. In 1889 he was appointed Minister Resident at Bangkok and in 1895 he was transferred to be Minister Resident and Consul-General at Lima and at Quito.

He retired from the Diplomatic Service in 1898 and died in Eastbourne, Sussex, on 18 December 1916.

== The medal ==
Jones' Victoria Cross is displayed at the Victoria Barracks in Sydney, New South Wales, Australia.

Diplomatic posts
Preceded by Ernest Satow	Minister Resident and Consul-General in Siam; 1889–1894	Succeeded by George Greville
Preceded by Charles Edward Mansfield	Minister Resident and Consul-General at Lima, and Minister Resident and Consul-General at Quito; 1894–1898	Succeeded by William Beauclerk
