= Arthur Fagan (rugby union) =

English international rugby union player

- Full name: Arthur Robert St Leger Fagan
- Born: 24 November 1862 Calcutta, British India
- Died: 15 March 1930 (aged 67) Highgate, England

Rugby union career
- Position: Three-quarter
International career
Years	Team	Apps	(Points)
1887	England	1	(0)

Arthur Robert St Leger Fagan (24 November 1862 – 15 March 1930) was an English international rugby union player.

Fagan, the son of a Calcutta judge, was active in rugby while studying medicine in London, where he turned out for Richmond, Guy's Hospital and United Hospitals. He also played some rugby in Devon for Tiverton.

Mainly a fullback, Fagan was used out of position as a three-quarter in his sole England appearance, against Ireland at Lansdowne Road in 1887. His impact was limited as a result.

Fagan's brother George was capped for Ireland.

== See also ==
- List of England national rugby union players
