= Robert Bunch =

British diplomat and secret agent

- Born: September 11, 1820; United States
- Died: March 21, 1881 (aged 60)
- Education: Oxford University
- Occupation: Diplomat
- Known for: Secret agent present in the United States South during the American Civil War
- Spouse: Charlotte Amelia Craig

Robert Bunch (born September 11, 1820, died March 21, 1881) was a British diplomat, who was a secret agent present in the United States South during the American Civil War. Before the outbreak of Civil War, he had served as a diplomatic representative, first in the North, and then replacing George Buckley-Mathew in Charleston, who was causing diplomatic problems. In particular, Mathew was vocally against South Carolina's recent rule of incarcerating British African sailors while in port.

== Life ==
Robert Bunch was from 1841 to 1845 attaché and private secretary of William Pitt Adams in Bogotá and Lima. In September 1844 he was sent together with Captain Sir Thomas Thompson as Joint Commissioner to the Supreme Junta of Government of Peru to Arequipa. On December 16, 1845, he was appointed Consular Agent in Lima. On February 6, 1846, he was appointed acting consul in Callao (Peru). Robert Bunch was vice-consul in New York City from October 25, 1848, to 1853. From 1853 to 1864, Bunch was consul in Charleston, South Carolina. In 1864 he became Consul General in Havana. From 1866 to 1878 he served as Minister Resident and Consul General in Colombia. He then took on diplomatic posts in Venezuela and Peru. Robert Bunch had been married to Charlotte Amelia Craig since 1853.

== Family and early life ==
Though Bunch was a diplomat and a spy for the British, he and his sister were actually born in America. The two were even baptized in New York's Trinity Church. However, he did all of his schooling in England and attended Oxford University. His mother's side was very well-connected, and respected as a prominent family who had close ties to the Roosevelt and Van Cortlandt families. In addition to this, his mother's lineage also includes Tories who spied for the British in the American Revolution and the War of 1812. His first foreign service related job was as a secretary for the British envoy in Columbia, then in Peru. In 1848, he moved to New York City and began working his way up to diplomatic positions. He married Emma Craig, his first cousin, in 1853, just before coming to Charleston.

== Diplomacy in Charleston ==
In 1853, Bunch worked at the office of British council in Charleston, then he served as the deputy consul in New York City, and then, the Foreign Office placed him in Philadelphia. Finally after much moving around, London had him trade positions with the consul in Charleston. In Charleston, the previous diplomat, George Buckley-Mathew, created disarray and confusion regarding the treatment of Negro-British sailors. As a result, Bunch's main issue during his time as a diplomat was to fix Mathew's mess. At the time, most of the black seamen were free men. The law denied them from even entering the harbor because these seamen had so much influence on local slaves. If the seamen were caught, they were to be incarcerated, and sometimes killed. The white Southern slave owners feared that their slaves would be inspired to run away to freedom. The Southerners also despised Britain's policies regarding abolishing slavery, and Bunch strongly disagreed with the Southerners. From Charleston, Bunch was to supply the London Slave Trade Department with meticulous and detailed letters about any American's attempting to oppose Britain's policies in the Caribbean as well as the Atlantic. To do this, he became very close with the people from South Carolina so he was able to keep track of anything from cotton trade to quarantines. However, there was much more to his job.

== Secrecy in Charleston ==
To the eyes of the Carolinians, Bunch only took reports of various items going out or coming into the port on ships, however, the main aspect of his diplomacy was a secret. Britain had consuls in most of the states in the United States. Bunch was included in the select few that worked in slave states. The overall purpose of his job was to keep Britain informed about the matters and affairs in the United States that would only be known by an insider. Bunch had to find out about confidential information regarding politics and the military. However, the most important part was every detail they could find about slavery. Though Bunch was unsuccessful in modifying the Negro Slave Act, he was an asset to the British. Since he befriended many influential Southerners, like William Henry Trescot, he was able to provide the British with information about where slaves were being traded, if and where illegal slave trade was occurring, and the number of people being traded, sold, and much more.
