= Henry Bax-Ironside =

British diplomat (1859–1929)

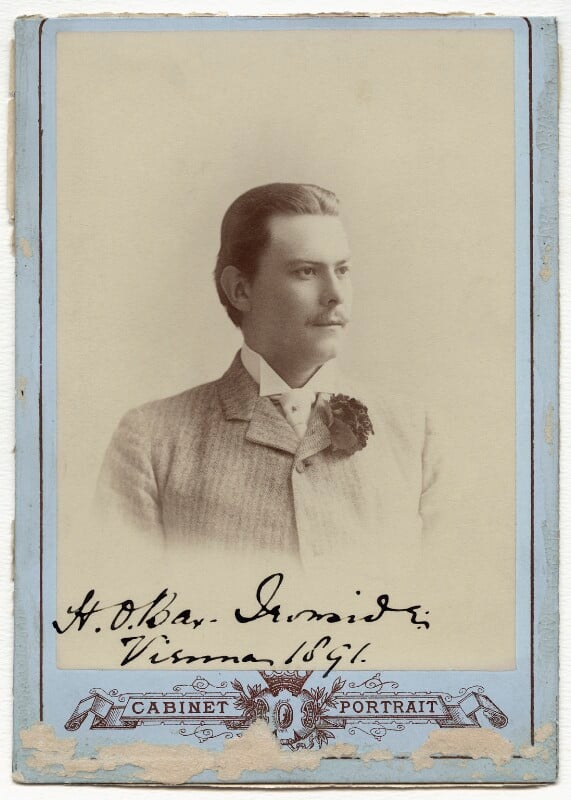
Bax-Ironside, c. 1891

Sir Henry George Outram Bax-Ironside, KCMG (15 November 1859 – 16 April 1929) was a British diplomat, ambassador to Venezuela, Chile, Switzerland and Bulgaria.

== Career ==
Henry George Outram Bax was the only son of John Henry Bax, of Houghton-le-Spring, who had married Sarah Elizabeth Hughes, and in 1866 took the surname Bax-Ironside by royal warrant, when his son became Henry Bax-Ironside. He was educated at Eton College and Exeter College, Oxford and joined the Diplomatic Service in 1883. He served in Copenhagen, Teheran, Vienna, Cairo, and Washington, D.C., and was briefly in charge of the Central American Legation in 1897 before being appointed Secretary of the Legation at Pekin in the same year.

Bax-Ironside was First Secretary of the Legation at Stockholm from 1900 until late 1902, when he was appointed Minister Resident and Consul-General at Carácas, serving as such until 1907. He arrived in Venezuela in the months leading up to the Venezuelan crisis of 1902–1903, when the United Kingdom, Germany and Italy imposed a naval blockade against the country from December 1902 until February 1903. Shortly before the actual blockade, Bax-Ironside and other members of his legation were evacuated by a British warship.

He was Minister Plenipotentiary to Chile 1907–09, Minister Plenipotentiary to Switzerland 1909–10, and Minister Plenipotentiary to Bulgaria, 1911–15. While in Bulgaria he was "His Majesty's Special Envoy Extraordinary to attend the ceremonies to be held in commemoration of the coming of age of His Royal Highness Prince Boris, Prince of Tarnovo, Heir to the Throne of Bulgaria" in 1912.

Henry Bax-Ironside was appointed a Knight Commander of the Order of St Michael and St George (KCMG) in the 1911 Coronation Honours.

== Family ==
Bad-Ironside married at St Peter and St Sigfrid's Church in Stockholm on 15 September 1902 Märtha Hedwig Jacquette Gyldenstolpe (1874–1910), daughter of Swedish nobleman and courtier Count August Gustaf Ferson Gyldenstolpe (1839–1919) and his wife Hedvig Fredrike Alice Nieroth (1850–1927). Her brother was the ornithologist Nils Carl Gustaf Fersen Gyldenstolpe.

After the death of his first wife, in 1913, he married Fanny Agnes (Effie) Jardine, née Willoughby (1857 – c. 1931).

Diplomatic posts
Preceded by William Haggard	Minister Resident at Carácas; 1902–07	Succeeded by Sir Vincent Corbett
Preceded by Arthur Raikes	Envoy Extraordinary and Minister Plenipotentiary to the Republic of Chile; 1907–09	Succeeded by Henry Lowther
Preceded by Sir George Bonham, 2nd Baronet	Envoy Extraordinary and Minister Plenipotentiary to the Swiss Confederation; 1909–1910	Succeeded by Esme Howard
Preceded by Mansfeldt Findlay	Envoy Extraordinary and Minister Plenipotentiary to His Majesty the King of the Bulgarians; 1911–15	Succeeded by No ambassador due to First World War
