= United Kingdom–Venezuela relations =

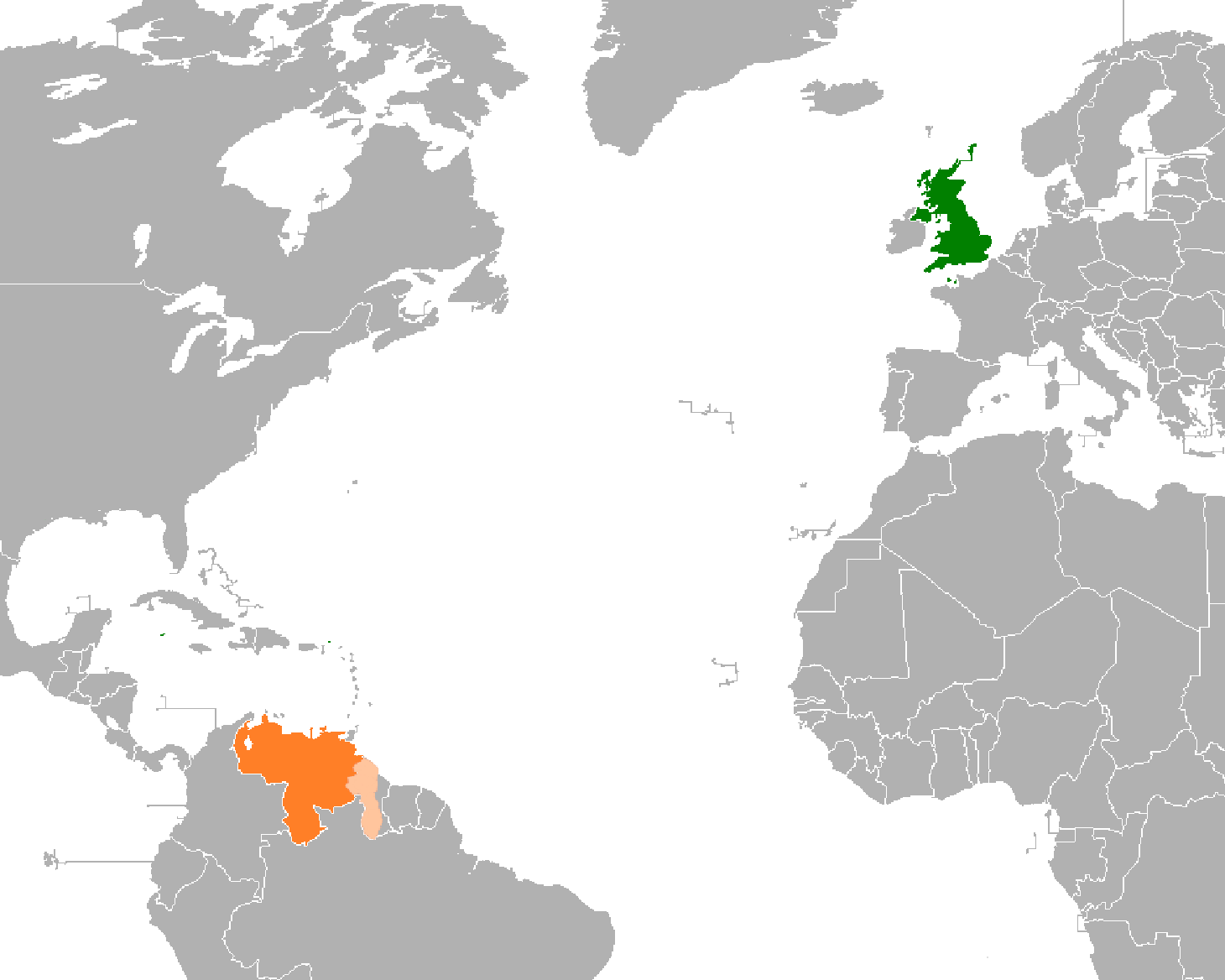

- United Kingdom: Venezuela

United Kingdom–Venezuela relations are the bilateral relations between the United Kingdom and Venezuela since 1821 when so-called "British Legions" of former British soldiers fought to defend the Second Republic of Venezuela against Spanish royalists in the Venezuelan War of Independence.

== War of Independence ==
Of Simón Bolívar's force in the Battle of Carabobo, of 6,500 or 8,000, between 340 or 350 were men of the British Rangers battalion, the great majority of them of Anglophone origin, commanded by Colonel Thomas Ilderton Ferrier and including many former members of the King's German Legion. Though greatly outnumbered and low on supplies, the legion soldiers managed to maintain control of tactically critical hills. By the battle's end, the legionary force had suffered 119 deaths, of which 11 were officers. Col. Ferrier was among the dead. Bolívar later praised the Legion troops and called them the "Saviors of my Fatherland", noting that they had distinguished themselves among other armies.

== Venezuelan crisis of 1895 ==
During the late 19th century, Britain refused to include in the proposed international arbitration the disputed territory with Venezuela east of the "Schomburgk Line", which a surveyor had drawn half-a-century earlier as a boundary between Venezuela and the former Dutch territory of British Guiana. The dispute ultimately saw Britain accept the United States' mediation in the dispute to force arbitration of the entire dispute territory, and tacitly accept the US right to intervene under the Monroe Doctrine. A tribunal convened in Paris in 1898 to decide the matter, and in 1899 awarded the bulk of the disputed territory to British Guiana.

== Falkland Islands ==
Although in the 20th century both countries were mostly on good terms, Venezuela expressed its support to Argentina over the Falkland Islands dispute that eventually led to the Falklands War between the United Kingdom and Argentina in 1982.

== Model United Nations ==
In many Models of United Nations in Venezuela, particularly Caracas, as guests, many British representatives gave a speech in what is known as an "opening act".

== Venezuelan presidential crisis ==
As of August 2017, the British Government advised against 'all but essential travel' to Venezuela, and withdrew dependents of British Embassy staff, due to the 'ongoing unrest and instability', citing the protests and crime in the country.

In January 2019 during a visit to the United States, UK Foreign Secretary Jeremy Hunt stated that "Nicolás Maduro is not the legitimate leader of Venezuela" and Venezuelan opposition leader Juan Guaidó should become President of Venezuela. On 4 February 2019, Hunt stated that the UK officially recognised Guaidó as president. However the United Kingdom continued to maintain consular and diplomatic relations with the Maduro controlled government, suggesting some ambiguity. This policy is a partial exception to the UK's long held policy of recognising states rather than specific governments.

In Autumn 2019 the Foreign and Commonwealth Office created the 'Venezuela Reconstruction Unit' led by John Saville, formerly UK ambassador to Venezuela, to coordinate a UK effort to support Venezuela. After this became public in May 2020, Venezuelan Foreign Minister Jorge Arreaza summoned the UK's Chargé d'Affaires "to present a formal protest and demand explanations", and in a Twitter post wrote "We demand that the United Kingdom of Great Britain and Northern Ireland withdraw from Washington's coup plans and from any destabilizing initiative". Venezuela characterised the Venezuela Reconstruction Unit as an attempt to give future preferred status to British companies in Venezuela.

=== Control of gold in London ===
Since 2018, the Bank of England has delayed releasing 31 tonnes of Venezuelan gold to the Maduro government. UK foreign office minister Alan Duncan said in January 2019 that while the disposition of the gold was a Bank of England decision, "they will take into account there are now a large number of countries across the world questioning the legitimacy of Nicolás Maduro and recognising that of Juan Guaidó.".

On 14 May 2020, the Central Bank of Venezuela filed a legal action against the Bank of England, to force Britain to release the €930m worth of gold to the United Nations Development Programme to buy healthcare equipment, medicine, and food for the COVID-19 pandemic in Venezuela. Guaidó has appointed a parallel Venezuelan central bank board of directors, so the court will have to decide which board of directors legally controls the gold. In July 2020 the High Court ruled that Guaidó was interim president, but the Court of Appeal ruled in October 2020 that the British Foreign Secretary's statement on recognition was ambiguous, clarified the legal importance of the distinction between de jure president and de facto president, and returned the case to the High Court for reconsideration. A 2026 report by The Guardian, refers to the $1.95bn Venezuelan gold held in Britain and who controls it following the Capture of Nicolas Maduro.

== Resident diplomatic missions ==
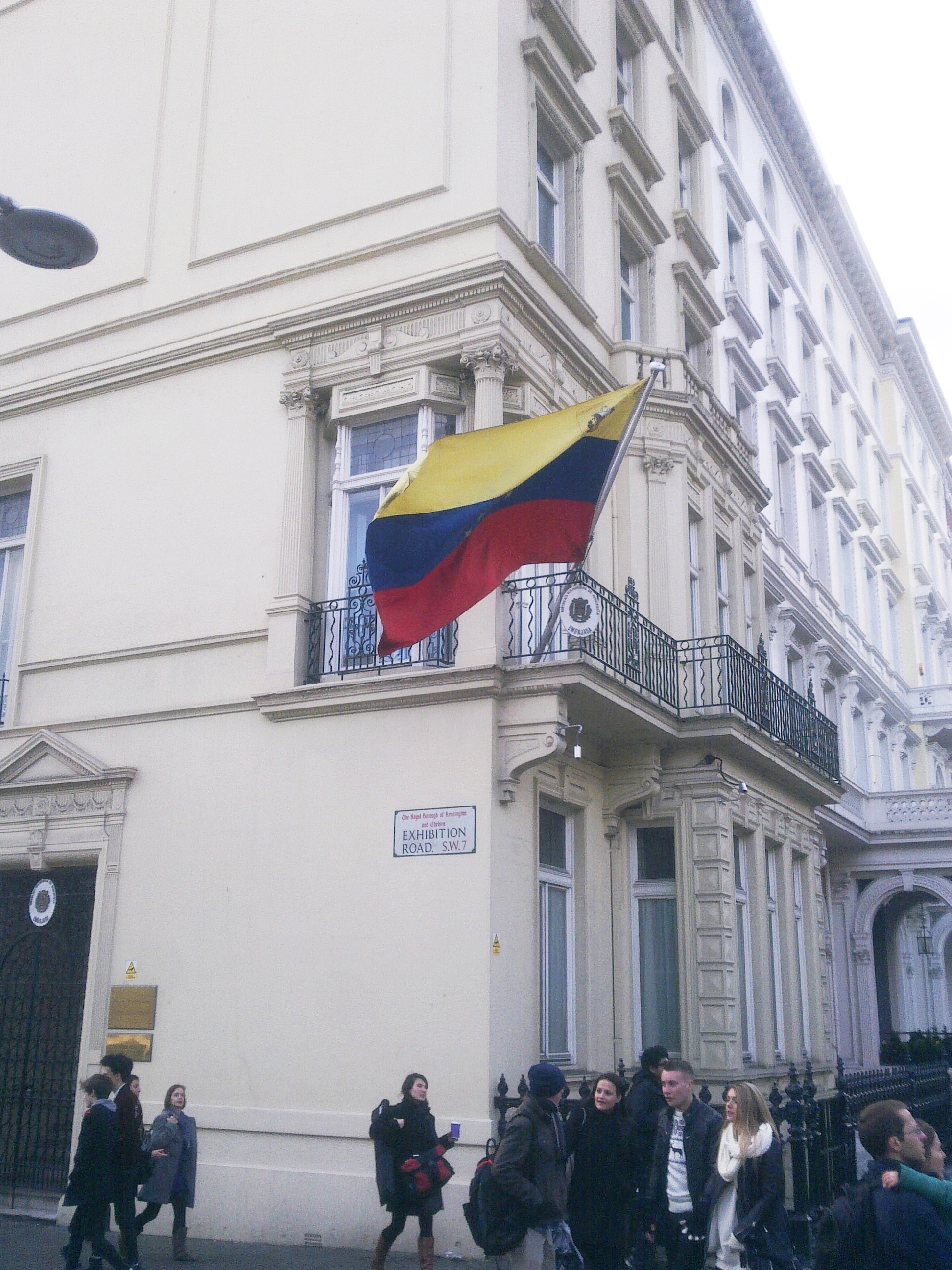
Embassy of Venezuela in London

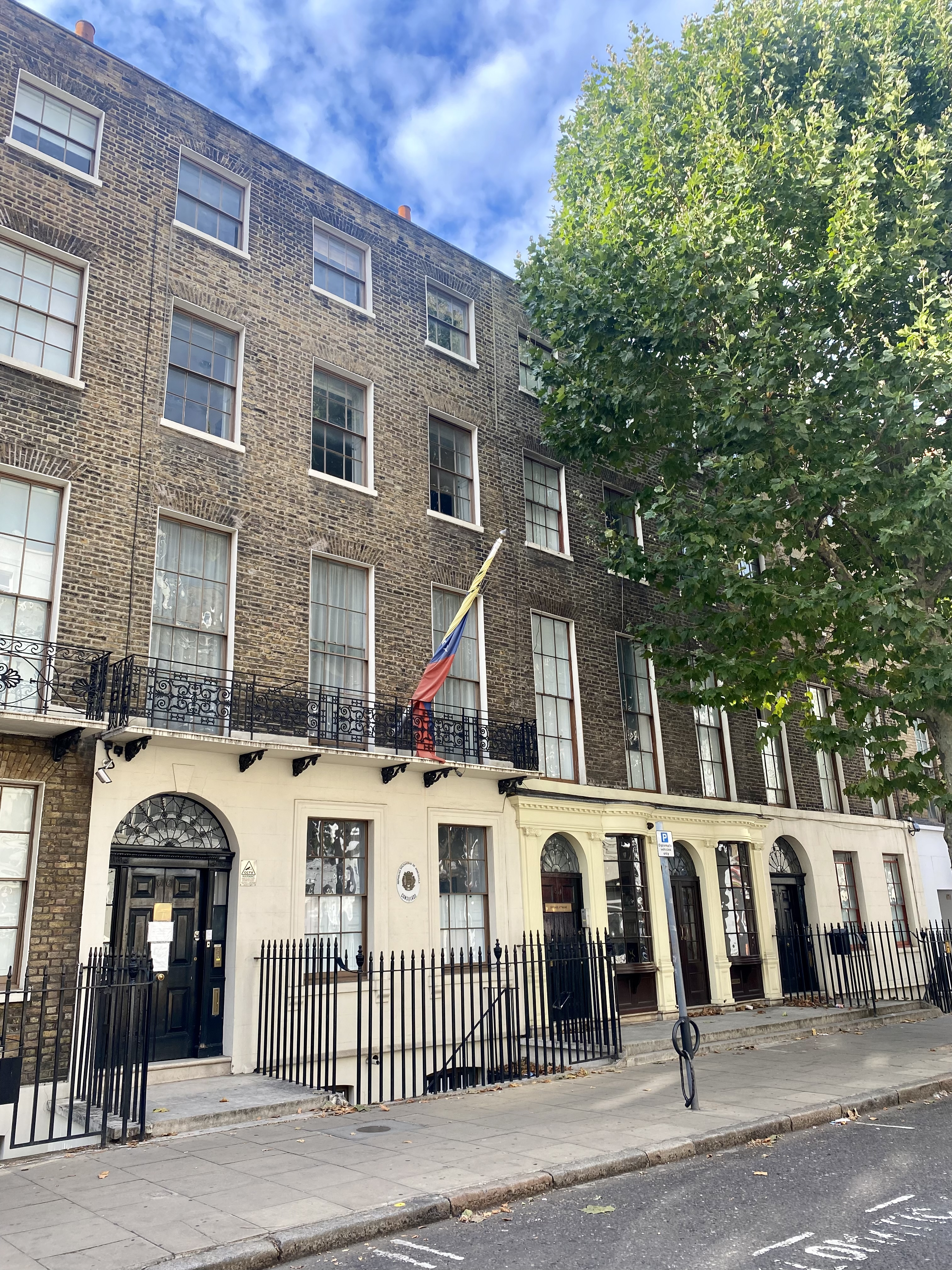
Consulate-General of Venezuela in London

- United Kingdom has an embassy in Caracas.
- Venezuela has an embassy and a consulate-general in London.

== See also ==
- Venezuela Crisis of 1895, a border conflict about sovereignty of Venezuelan territory of Essequibo which the UK claimed as part of British Guiana.
- Venezuela Crisis of 1902–1903, in which the UK was involved in a military blockade to enforce payment of Venezuelan debts
- Latin America-United Kingdom relations
- Venezuelans in the United Kingdom
- Statue of Simón Bolívar, London
