= Alan Charlton (diplomat) =

British former diplomat

Alan Charlton CMG, CVO
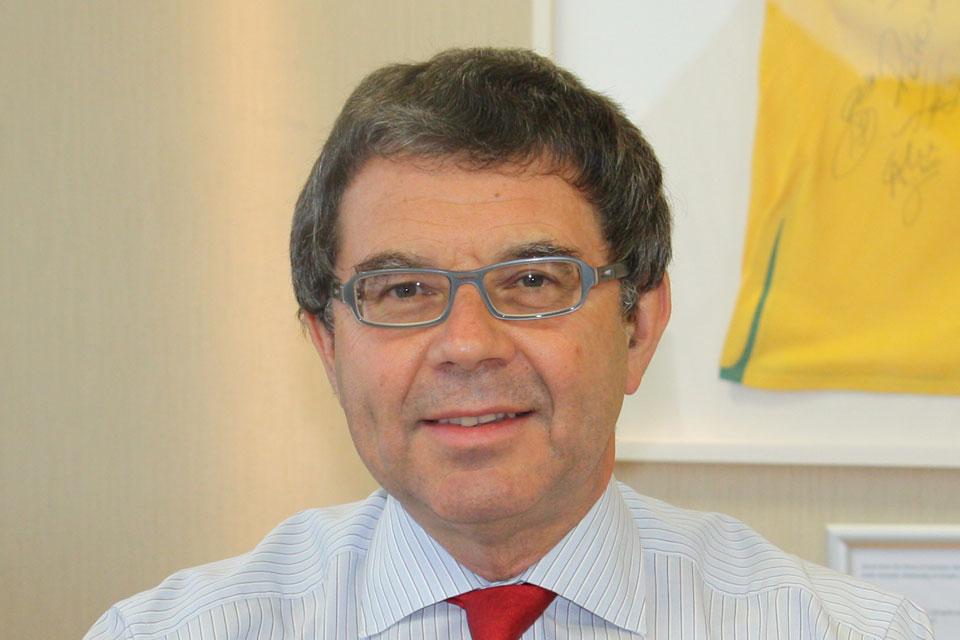
- Born: 1952 (age 73–74); Stapleford, Nottingham, United Kingdom
- Occupation: Former diplomat
- Employer: Her Majesty's Diplomatic Service
- Known for: British Ambassador to Brazil

Signature
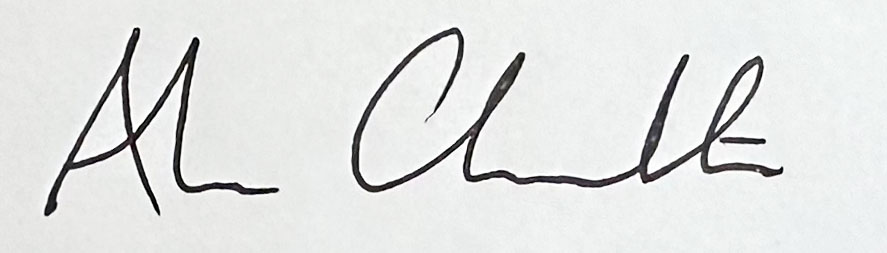

Alan Charlton CMG CVO (born 21 June 1952) is a British former diplomat who was Ambassador to Brazil from 2008 to 2013. Following retirement from his diplomatic career, he has been active writing books, promoting relations between the United Kingdom and Latin America, lecturing on cruise ships and volunteering with the Samaritans.

== Biography ==
=== Early life and education ===
Alan Charlton was born on 21 June 1952 in Stapleford, Nottingham, to parents Henry and Eva Charlton. He attended Nottingham High School, and then Gonville and Caius College, Cambridge (MA), Leicester University (PGCE) and Manchester University (BLing).

=== Diplomatic career ===
Alan Charlton joined the Diplomatic Service in 1978 and in his early career served in the British Embassy in Amman, after learning Arabic, and in the British Military Government in Berlin before, during and after the Fall of the Berlin Wall.

He was Deputy British Ambassador to the United States and Germany. He worked on a wide range of issues, notably former Yugoslavia when he was a lead player in the Foreign and Commonwealth Office in the 1990s. He was made a Commander of the Most Distinguished Order of St Michael and St George (CMG) in the 1996 New Year Honours in recognition of this work.

As British Ambassador to Brazil for 4 years and 7 months, he supervised five posts: the Embassy in Brasília; Consulates-General in São Paulo, Rio de Janeiro and Recife; and a Trade Office in Porto Alegre. During his period of office, he pressed forward in Brazil with a major UK government effort to strengthen relations with the world's large emerging economies and with Latin America. There was a sharp increase in Ministerial visits, including Prime Ministers Gordon Brown and David Cameron, and increased support and encouragement for British business. UK and Brazil agreed to a Strategic Partnership, with annual meetings led by foreign ministers to review and boost bilateral relations. His particular focus in Brazil was on working with British business, education and science.

His diplomatic career was marked by visits overseas by the British royal family, most notably the state visit of Queen Elizabeth II to the US in 2007, after which he was made Commander of the Royal Victorian Order (CVO) for his role. Prince (now King) Charles made his first major overseas visit with (now Queen) Camilla Parker Bowles to Brazil in 2009; they stayed at his official diplomatic residence. The visit of Prince Harry to Brazil in 2012 on his first solo overseas tour, gave a major boost to the UK profile.

=== Post diplomatic career ===
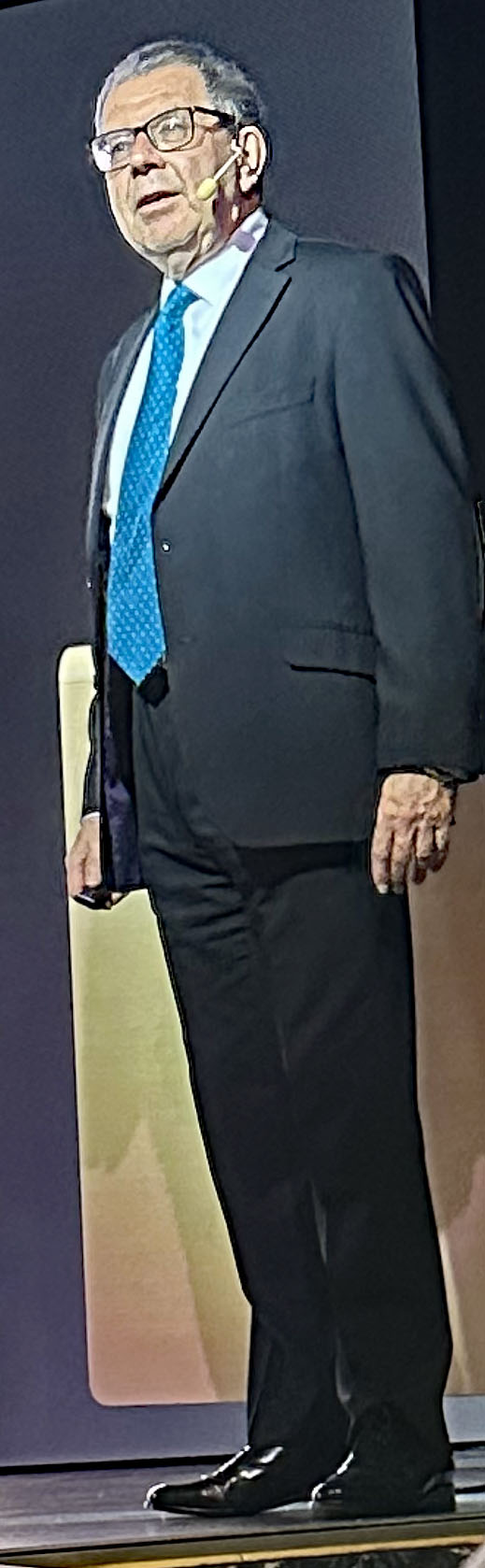
Alan Charlton lecturing on a cruise ship in December 2022

After leaving the Diplomatic Service in 2013, Alan Charlton held several positions, including: De Montfort University, as a governor for 6 years and also Chair of the Audit Committee (2021 – 2022); Honorary Professor at the University of Nottingham for 6 years; a Member of the Advisory Board of the Institute of Latin American Studies for 6 years, the Robin Humphreys Fellow there and its chair in the final year; Member of the advisory board of the Brazil Institute of the King's College London; and a governor of Sherborne School for 6 years and Sherborne Qatar. He was a member of the advisory board of the Brazil Institute of King's College London. He has lectured in Germany, the United States, Brazil and the United Kingdom. He speaks Portuguese, German and French, in addition to English.

Alan Charlton is a trustee and vice-chair of Canning House, a charitable organisation promoting links between the UK and Latin America. In 2014 he founded the UK-Brazil Conversa, a forum for discussion under the Chatham House Rule for business people, public policy makers, educationalists and others with the aim of making more of the synergies between the two countries in these interconnected fields. The first meeting was held in Cambridge from 5 to 7 September 2014. Conversa 2 was held from 13 to 15 November 2015 in Rio de Janeiro. Conversa 3 was in London 2017; Conversa 4 was in São Paulo 2019; Conversa 5 was held online during the COVID lockdown in 2020; and Conversa 6 was held in Rio de Janeiro in June 2022.

Alan Charlton directs training courses on negotiation and diplomacy for the Centre for Political and Diplomatic Studies (CPDS).

He lectures on cruise ships, with his 13th lecture tour being on the Viking Jupiter in South America in December 2022. He is active with The Samaritans as a listening volunteer, leader and recruiter. He has authored four published books: “Shaking My Briefcase - Diplomatic Stories”; “Nottingham Family Squire”; “My Stapleford and Nottingham” and “Apollo Cokkinis - An Extraordinary Life”. The last three are based on his research into his own and his wife's family.

== Career ==
External media
- Media links for Alan Charlton

Images
- Photograph of Charlton with Prince Harry, during the prince's 2012 visit to Brazil (from CBS News).
- Charlton speaking on Brasília's English Culture in Brazil in 2013.

Video
- Brazil: A Force in the World?, a 2016 speech by Charlton at Gresham College.

- 1978–1979: Foreign and Commonwealth Office, desk officer in West Africa Department
- 1979–1980: Arabic language training
- 1981–1984: British embassy Amman, Second Secretary, later First Secretary
- 1984–1986: Foreign and Commonwealth Office, desk officer for Israel and Lebanon
- 1986–1990: Berlin, British Military Government (later British Mission) Deputy Political Adviser
- 1991–1992: Cabinet Office, Deputy Chief of Assessments Staff
- 1993–1996: Foreign and Commonwealth Office Head of East Adriatic Unit and UK member of Bosnia Contact Group
- 1996–2001: British Embassy Bonn (later Berlin), Counsellor then Deputy Head of Mission
- 2001–2001: Foreign and Commonwealth Office, Director, South East Europe
- 2001–2004: Foreign and Commonwealth Office, Director of Human Resources
- 2004–2007: British Embassy Washington, Deputy Head of Mission
- 2008–2013: British Ambassador, Brasília

Diplomatic posts
Preceded by Peter Collecott	British Ambassador to Brazil; 2008–2013	Succeeded by Alex Ellis
