= The Cuba Wars =

2009 book by Daniel P. Erikson

The Cuba Wars: Fidel Castro, the United States, and the Next Revolution
- Author: Daniel P. Erikson
- Publisher: Bloomsbury Press
- Publication date: 2009

The Cuba Wars: Fidel Castro, the United States, and the Next Revolution is a 2009 book by Daniel P. Erikson based on a number of visits to the country of Cuba and interviews with many authorities in Cuba and the United States. The author is a senior associate at the Inter-American Dialogue thinktank in Washington, and the book was published by Bloomsbury Press and received positive reviews.

== The book ==
Based on more than a dozen trips to Cuba since 2001 and more than fifty interviews of major players in Washington, D.C., Havana, and Miami. It was published by Bloomsbury Press in paperback in 2009.

== The author ==
Erikson is a graduate of Greely High School in Cumberland Center, ME, and a senior associate at the Inter-American Dialogue thinktank in Washington. He was previously a research associate at the Harvard Business School and a Fulbright scholar in relations between the United States and Mexico. He is the author of over fifty published academic and opinion articles on current affairs in the Western Hemisphere.

== Reception ==
This has been “highly recommended” by Library Journal for “remarkable insight into the fate of Cuba after Fidel.” Jorge Domínguez of Harvard University praised the book for its “fascinating stories that illustrate the larger drama,” and Riordan Roett of Johns Hopkins School of Advanced International Studies says that “Wise policy makers will take Erikson’s book as a guide to what to do next.” Booklist described it as "An informative and important analysis".
