= James Bottomley =

James Bottomley may refer to:

- James Bottomley (diplomat) (1920–2013), British diplomat
- Jim Bottomley (1900–1959), American baseball player
- James Thomson Bottomley (1845–1926), Irish-born British physicist
