= List of ambassadors of the United Kingdom to Spain =

His Britannic Majesty's Ambassador to the Kingdom of Spain
- Royal arms of His Majesty's Government

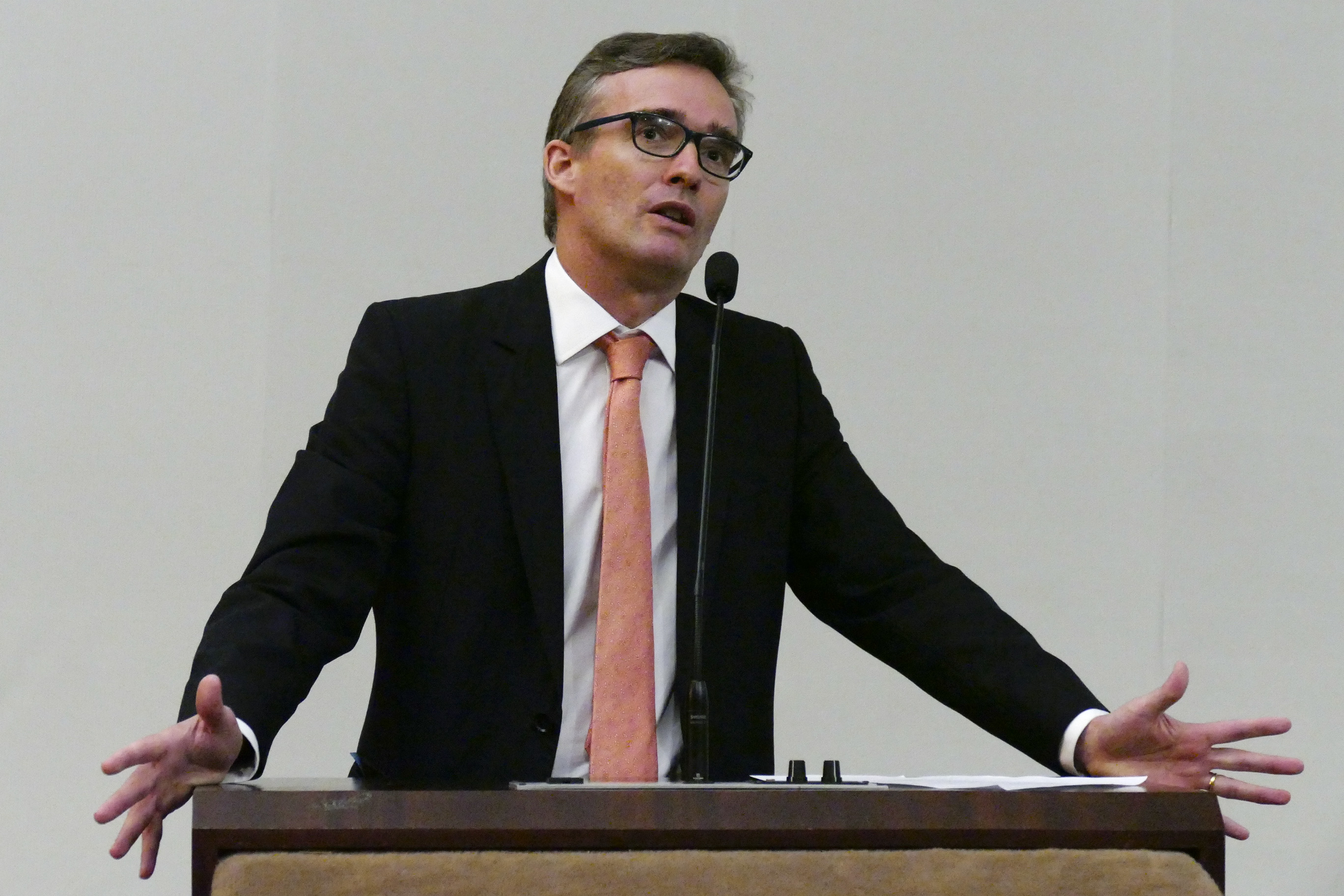
- Incumbent; Sir Alex Ellis since 9 September 2024
- Style: His Excellency
- Reports to: Foreign Secretary
- Seat: British Embassy in Madrid
- Appointer: King Charles III
- Term length: No term fixed
- Inaugural holder: John Stile; First Resident Ambassador to Spain
- Formation: 1505; Resident Ambassador
- Website: British Embassy, Madrid

The ambassador of the United Kingdom to Spain is the United Kingdom's foremost diplomatic representative in the Kingdom of Spain, and in charge of the UK's diplomatic mission in Spain. The official title is His Britannic Majesty's Ambassador to the Kingdom of Spain.

The British ambassador to Spain is also non-resident ambassador to the Principality of Andorra.

In 1822, the foreign secretary at that time, George Canning, downgraded the embassy to a mission, and the head of mission from an ambassador to an envoy extraordinary and minister plenipotentiary, to reflect Spain's decreased importance on the world stage. The mission in Madrid was upgraded to a full embassy once more on 9 December 1887.

== List of heads of mission ==
The following is a partial list of British ambassadors to Spain.

Titles of the heads of mission:

- From 1509 to 1683: Ambassador
- From 1683 to 1710: Envoy Extraordinary
- From 1711 to 1821: Ambassador
- From 1822 to 1887: Envoy Extraordinary and Minister Plenipotentiary
- Since 1887: Ambassador

Appointed/accreditation	Incumbent	Monarch	Envoy to	Left office
1505	John Stile	Henry VIII of England	Ferdinand II of Aragon	16 June 1518
3 June 1512	William Knight	Henry VIII of England	Ferdinand II of Aragon	1 September 1513
15 July 1517	Sir Thomas Spinelly	Henry VIII of England	Charles I of Spain	1522
28 February 1518	John Kite; John Bourchier, 2nd Baron Berners	Henry VIII of England	Charles I of Spain	1 March 1519
1533	Richard Pate	Henry VIII of England	Charles I of Spain	1537
1537	Sir Thomas Wyatt	Henry VIII of England	Charles I of Spain	1539
12 March 1554	John Russell, 1st Earl of Bedford; Thomas Radclyffe, 3rd Earl of Sussex	Mary I of England	Philip II of Spain	20 July 1554
12 January 1560	Anthony Browne, 1st Viscount Montagu	Elizabeth I of England	Philip II of Spain	24 June 1560
24 June 1560	Anthony Browne, 1st Viscount Montagu; Sir Thomas Chamberlain	Elizabeth I of England	Philip II of Spain	24 June 1562
30 September 1561	Thomas Chaloner	Elizabeth I of England	Philip II of Spain	15 May 1565
5 March 1565	William Phayre	Elizabeth I of England	Philip II of Spain	4 April 1566
12 January 1566	John Man	Elizabeth I of England	Philip II of Spain	5 October 1568
18 November 1576	Sir John Smith	Elizabeth I of England	Philip II of Spain	28 July 1577
December 1577	Thomas Wilkes	Elizabeth I of England	Philip II of Spain	February 1578
May 1579	Edward Wotton, 1st Baron Wotton	Elizabeth I of England	Philip II of Spain	
January 1583	William Wade	Elizabeth I of England	Philip II of Spain	August 1584
1584	Thomas Wilson	Elizabeth I of England	Philip II of Spain	
2 March 1605	Charles Howard, 1st Earl of Nottingham	James VI and I	Philip III of Spain	4 July 1577
1605	Francis Cottington, 1st Baron Cottington	James VI and I	Philip III of Spain	
1605	Charles Cornwallis	James VI and I	Philip III of Spain	1609
1608	John Digby, 1st Earl of Bristol	James VI and I	Philip III of Spain	
1609	Francis Cottington, 1st Baron Cottington	James VI and I	Philip III of Spain	1611
1609	Peter Wyche	James VI and I	Philip IV of Spain	1611
1616	William Cecil, 17th Baron de Ros	James VI and I	Philip III of Spain	
1617	John Digby, 1st Earl of Bristol	James VI and I	Philip IV of Spain	1618
1617	John Digby, 1st Earl of Bristol	James VI and I	Philip III of Spain	
1618	Walter Aston, 1st Lord Aston of Forfar	James VI and I	Philip III of Spain	
1622	Mr. Hole	James VI and I	Philip IV of Spain	
1622	Simon Digby (fl. 1620–1640s)	James VI and I	Philip IV of Spain	1640
1622	John Digby, 1st Earl of Bristol	James VI and I	Philip IV of Spain	
1623	Endymion Porter	James VI and I	Philip IV of Spain	
1624	Stephen Gardiner	James VI and I	Philip IV of Spain	
1 March 1625	Peter Wyche	Charles I of England	Philip IV of Spain	30 April 1626
11 August 1628	Endymion Porter	Charles I of England	Philip IV of Spain	5 January 1629
1 July 1629	Francis Cottington, 1st Baron Cottington	Charles I of England	Philip IV of Spain	20 April 1631
18 December 1630	Arthur Hopton	Charles I of England	Philip IV of Spain	23 April 1636
13 July 1634	John Taylor	Charles I of England	Philip IV of Spain	24 May 1635
26 December 1634	Walter Aston, 1st Lord Aston of Forfar	Charles I of England	Philip IV of Spain	31 July 1638
April 1638	Sir Richard Fanshawe, 1st Baronet	Charles I of England	Philip IV of Spain	10 June 1638
21 March 1638	Arthur Hopton	Charles I of England	Philip IV of Spain	December 1645
25 January 1650	Anthony Ascham	English Council of State	Philip IV of Spain	27 May 1650
27 May 1650	George Fisher	English Council of State	Philip IV of Spain	26 September 1651
1654	Anglo-Spanish War (1654-1660)	English Council of State	Philip IV of Spain	1660
20 February 1666	Edward Montagu, 1st Earl of Sandwich	Charles II of England	Charles II of Spain	11 October 1668
26 February 1666	Robert Southwell	Charles II of England	Charles II of Spain	22 June 1666
10 July 1668	Sir John Werden, 1st Baronet	Charles II of England	Charles II of Spain	10 June 1668
10 July 1668	William Godolphin	Charles II of England	Charles II of Spain	10 June 1668
21 November 1671	Robert Spencer, 2nd Earl of Sunderland	Charles II of England	Charles II of Spain	20 May 1672
29 June 1677	Ignatius White	Charles II of England	Charles II of Spain	October 1677
12 June 1679	Sir Henry Goodricke, 2nd Baronet	Charles II of England	Charles II of Spain	27 March 1683
10 December 1682	Peter Lefett	Charles II of England	Charles II of Spain	16 November 1685
13 May 1685	Charles Granville, 2nd Earl of Bath	Charles II of England	Charles II of Spain	December 1688
13 May 1685	John Stafford	James II of England	Charles II of Spain	December 1688
May 1689	Viscount Dursley	Mary II of England	Charles II of Spain	August 1689
1689	Alexander Stanhope	Mary II of England	Charles II of Spain	1699
1699	Francis Schonenberg	William III of England	Charles II of Spain	1702
1702	War of the Spanish Succession	William III of England	Philip V of Spain	1702
1705	Mitford Crowe	Anne, Queen of Great Britain	Philip V of Spain	1706
1705	Paul Methuen	Anne, Queen of Great Britain	Philip V of Spain	1706
1706	Charles Mordaunt, 3rd Earl of Peterborough, James Stanhope, 1st Earl Stanhope (joint envoys)	Anne, Queen of Great Britain	Charles III of Hungary	1707 1710
1711	James Craggs the Younger	Anne, Queen of Great Britain	Charles III of Hungary	1711
1711	John Campbell, 2nd Duke of Argyll	Anne, Queen of Great Britain	Charles III of Hungary	1712
1712	Robert Sutton, 2nd Baron Lexinton	Anne, Queen of Great Britain	Philip V of Spain	1713
1713	Robert Benson, 1st Baron Bingley	Anne, Queen of Great Britain	Philip V of Spain	1714
1714	Paul Methuen	Anne, Queen of Great Britain	Philip V of Spain	1715
1715	George Dodington, 1st Baron Melcombe	George I of Great Britain	Philip V of Spain	1717
1717	John Chetwynd, 2nd Viscount Chetwynd	George I of Great Britain	Philip V of Spain	1718
1718	War of the Quadruple Alliance	George I of Great Britain	Philip V of Spain	1720
1720	Luke Schaub	George I of Great Britain	Philip V of Spain	1720
1720	William Stanhope, 1st Earl of Harrington	George I of Great Britain	Philip V of Spain	1727
1727	Anglo-Spanish War (1727–29)	George I of Great Britain	Philip V of Spain	
1729	Benjamin Keene	George II of Great Britain	Philip V of Spain	1739
1739	War of Jenkins' Ear	George II of Great Britain	Philip V of Spain	1748
1748	Sir Benjamin Keene	George II of Great Britain	Ferdinand VI of Spain	1757
1758	George Hervey, 2nd Earl of Bristol	George II of Great Britain	Ferdinand VI of Spain	1761
1761	Anglo-Spanish War (1761)	George III of the United Kingdom	Charles III of Spain	1763
19 February 1763	John Montagu, 4th Earl of Sandwich	George III of the United Kingdom	Charles III of Spain	
1763	William Nassau de Zuylestein, 4th Earl of Rochford	George III of the United Kingdom	Charles III of Spain	1766
1766	Sir James Gray, 2nd Baronet	George III of the United Kingdom	Charles III of Spain	1769
1770	George Pitt, 1st Baron Rivers	George III of the United Kingdom	Charles III of Spain	1771
1771	James Harris	George III of the United Kingdom	Charles III of Spain	
1771	Thomas Robinson, 2nd Baron Grantham	George III of the United Kingdom	Charles III of Spain	1779
1779	Anglo-Spanish War (1779-1783)	George III of the United Kingdom	Charles III of Spain	1783
1783	John Crichton-Stuart, 1st Marquess of Bute	George III of the United Kingdom	Charles III of Spain	
1783	Robert Liston	George III of the United Kingdom	Charles III of Spain	1788
1784	Philip Stanhope, 5th Earl of Chesterfield	George III of the United Kingdom	Charles III of Spain	1785
1788	William Eden, 1st Baron Auckland	George III of the United Kingdom	Charles IV of Spain	1790
1790	Alleyne FitzHerbert, 1st Baron St Helens	George III of the United Kingdom	Charles IV of Spain	1794
1794	Francis James Jackson	George III of the United Kingdom	Charles IV of Spain	1795
1795	John Crichton-Stuart, 1st Marquess of Bute	George III of the United Kingdom	Charles IV of Spain	1796
1796		George III of the United Kingdom	Charles IV of Spain	1802
1802	John Hookham Frere	George III of the United Kingdom	Charles IV of Spain	1804
1808	Charles Stuart	George III of the United Kingdom	Ferdinand VII of Spain	1808
1808	John Hookham Frere	George III of the United Kingdom	Ferdinand VII of Spain	1808
1809	Richard Wellesley, 1st Marquess Wellesley	George III of the United Kingdom	Ferdinand VII of Spain	1809
1810	Henry Wellesley	George III of the United Kingdom	Ferdinand VII of Spain	1821
1822	William à Court, 1st Baron Heytesbury	George IV of the United Kingdom	Ferdinand VII of Spain	
1825	Frederick Lamb, 3rd Viscount Melbourne	George IV of the United Kingdom	Ferdinand VII of Spain	
5 December 1827	George Bosanquet	George IV of the United Kingdom	Ferdinand VII of Spain	1830
1830	Henry Unwin Addington	George IV of the United Kingdom	Ferdinand VII of Spain	1833
1833	George Villiers, 4th Earl of Clarendon	William IV of the United Kingdom	Isabella II of Spain	1839
1839	George Jerningham	Queen Victoria	Isabella II of Spain	
1840	Sir Arthur Ingram Aston	Queen Victoria	Isabella II of Spain	1843
1843	George Jerningham	Queen Victoria	Isabella II of Spain	
1844	Henry Bulwer, 1st Baron Dalling and Bulwer	Queen Victoria	Isabella II of Spain	19 May 1848
19 May 1848	Revolutions of 1848	Queen Victoria	Isabella II of Spain	1850
1850	John Hobart Caradoc, 2nd Baron Howden	Queen Victoria	Isabella II of Spain	
1858	Sir Andrew Buchanan, 1st Baronet	Queen Victoria	Isabella II of Spain	
1860	John Fiennes Twisleton Crampton	Queen Victoria	Isabella II of Spain	
1869	Austen Henry Layard	Queen Victoria	Francisco Serrano, 1st Duke of la Torre	
1878	Sir Lionel Sackville-West	Queen Victoria	Alfonso XII of Spain	
1881	Robert Morier	Queen Victoria	Alfonso XII of Spain	
1884	Francis Clare Ford	Queen Victoria	Alfonso XII of Spain	1887
1887	Francis Clare Ford	Queen Victoria	Alfonso XIII of Spain	1892
1892	Henry Drummond Wolff	Queen Victoria	Alfonso XIII of Spain	1900
1900	Henry Mortimer Durand	Queen Victoria	Alfonso XIII of Spain	1903
1903	Edwin Henry Egerton	Edward VII	Alfonso XIII of Spain	1904
1904	Arthur Nicolson, 1st Baron Carnock	Edward VII	Alfonso XIII of Spain	1905
February 1906	Maurice William Ernest de Bunsen	Edward VII	Alfonso XIII of Spain	1913
1913	Arthur Henry Hardinge	George V	Alfonso XIII of Spain	
1919	Esme Howard, 1st Baron Howard of Penrith	George V	Alfonso XIII of Spain	1919
1924	Sir Horace Rumbold, 9th Baronet	George V	Alfonso XIII of Spain	
1928	George Dixon Grahame	George V	Alfonso XIII of Spain	
1935	Henry Chilton	George V	Niceto Alcalá-Zamora	
27 February 1939	Maurice Peterson	George V	Francisco Franco	1940
1940	Samuel Hoare, 1st Viscount Templewood	George VI	Francisco Franco	
1945	Sir Victor Mallet	George VI	Francisco Franco	
1946	Sir Douglas Howard	George VI	Francisco Franco	1949
10 November 1949	Robert Hankey, 2nd Baron Hankey	George VI	Francisco Franco	1950
1951	Sir John Balfour	George VI	Francisco Franco	1954
1954	Sir William Ivo Mallet	Elizabeth II	Francisco Franco	1960
1960	Sir George Labouchère	Elizabeth II	Francisco Franco	
1966	Sir Alan Meredith Williams	Elizabeth II	Francisco Franco	
1969	Sir John Russell	Elizabeth II	Francisco Franco	
1974	Sir Charles Wiggin	Elizabeth II	Francisco Franco	1977
1977	Sir Antony Acland	Elizabeth II	Juan Carlos I of Spain	
1980	Sir Richard Parsons	Elizabeth II	Juan Carlos I of Spain	
1984	Lord Nicholas Gordon-Lennox	Elizabeth II	Juan Carlos I of Spain	1989
1989	Sir Robin Fearn	Elizabeth II	Juan Carlos I of Spain	
1994	David Brighty	Elizabeth II	Juan Carlos I of Spain	
1998	Sir Peter Torry	Elizabeth II	Juan Carlos I of Spain	1998
2003	Sir Stephen Wright	Elizabeth II	Juan Carlos I of Spain	2007
2007	Dame Denise Holt	Elizabeth II	Juan Carlos I of Spain	2009
2009	Giles Paxman	Elizabeth II	Juan Carlos I of Spain	2013
2013	Simon Manley	Elizabeth II	Juan Carlos I of Spain King Felipe VI of Spain	2019
2019	Hugh Elliott	Elizabeth II; Charles III	King Felipe VI of Spain	2024
2024	Sir Alex Ellis	Charles III	King Felipe VI of Spain	
