= John Stiles (disambiguation) =

John Stiles is a Canadian writer.

John Stiles may also refer to:

- John Stiles (footballer) (born 1964), British former association footballer
- John Dodson Stiles (1822–1896), American politician; U.S. Representative from Pennsylvania
- Sir John Haskins Eyles-Stiles, 4th Baronet (1741–1768), British nobility; of the Eyles-Stiles Baronets
- John Stiles (pseudonym), a legal pseudonym similar to John Doe

== See also ==
- Stiles (surname)
- John Styles, English Congregational minister and animal rights writer.
- John Styles (entertainer); appeared in the "That's How Murder Snowballs" (1969) episode of Randall and Hopkirk (Deceased) television series
- John Stile, English ambassador to Spain
