= Geoffrey Harrison =

British diplomat (1908–1990)

Sir Geoffrey Harrison GCMG KCVO
- Harrison in 1956

British Ambassador to the Soviet Union
- In office 27 August 1965 – 1968
- Preceded by: Sir Humphrey Trevelyan
- Succeeded by: Sir Archibald Duncan Wilson

British Ambassador to Iran
- In office 3 November 1958 – 1963
- Preceded by: Sir Roger Stevens
- Succeeded by: Sir Denis Wright

British Ambassador to Brazil
- In office 1 October 1956 – 1958
- Preceded by: Geoffrey Harington Thompson
- Succeeded by: Geoffrey Wallinger

Personal details
- Born: Geoffrey Wedgwood Harrison; 18 July 1908 Southsea, Hampshire, England, United Kingdom
- Died: 12 April 1990 (aged 81) Crawley, West Sussex, England, United Kingdom
- Spouse: Amy Katherine Clive (m. 1935)
- Education: King's College, Cambridge
- Occupation: Diplomat

Sir Geoffrey Wedgwood Harrison GCMG KCVO (18 July 1908 – 12 April 1990) was a British diplomat, who served as the United Kingdom's ambassador to Brazil, Iran and the Soviet Union. Harrison's tenure in Moscow was terminated in 1968, when he was recalled to London after his admission to the Foreign Office that he had an affair with his Russian maid, later revealed as a KGB "honey trap" operation.

== Early life and education ==
Harrison was born in Southsea, Hampshire. His parents were Thomas Edmund Harrison, a commander in the Royal Navy, who was a grandson of Josiah Wedgwood III, and Maud Winifred Godman. He was educated at Winchester College in Hampshire and then at King's College, Cambridge. He joined the Foreign Office in 1932 and was posted to Japan and Germany before the outbreak of World War II. On 2 July 1935, he married Amy Katherine Clive (the daughter of Sir Robert Clive, the British ambassador to Japan) at the embassy in Tokyo.

== Diplomatic career ==
In October 1932, Harrison was appointed as a third secretary in His Majesty's Diplomatic Service, and in October 1937, he was promoted to second secretary. In July 1942, he was acting first secretary.

As a junior diplomat at the Foreign Office, Harrison drafted a memorandum, "The Future of Austria", which greatly contributed to the notion of Austria as an independent state. Harrison also contributed to the British draft declaration on Austria for the 1943 Moscow Declaration.

He was also the principal drafter of Article XII of the Potsdam Agreement, which concerned the expulsion of ethnic Germans from central and eastern Europe after World War II.

On 1 October 1956, Harrison was granted his first ambassadorship, as Ambassador Extraordinary and Plenipotentiary to Brazil. On 3 November 1958, he was transferred to Tehran as Ambassador to Iran/Persia. Between 1963 and 1965, Harrison was based in London as Deputy Under Secretary of State at the Foreign Office.

On 27 August 1965, Harrison was appointed as ambassador to the Soviet Union. In 1968, he engaged in a brief affair with a Russian chambermaid who was working at the British Embassy. Harrison recalled not asking or knowing if she worked for the KGB, but he said that it was assumed that every Soviet employee at the embassy worked or was an agent for the Soviet secret service. When security concerns arose over the Soviet occupation of Czechoslovakia, and after he had been sent incriminating photographs taken by the KGB, Harrison informed the Foreign Office of his indiscretion, which immediately terminated his appointment and recalled him to Britain. Harrison revealed the affair to The Sunday Times newspaper in 1981.

The journalist and author John Miller, who was part of the British press corps in the Soviet Union at the time of Harrison's ambassadorship, revealed more details of the affair in his memoir All Them Cornfields and Ballet in the Evenings: Miller named the maid with whom Harrison was involved as Galya Ivanov and said he was told that by a Russian contact that she was not only a KGB agent but also the sister of Eugene Ivanov, the Soviet naval attaché in Britain involved in the Profumo affair.

== Honours ==
Harrison was appointed a Knight Commander of the Order of St Michael and St George (KCMG) in the 1955 New Year Honours.

In the 1968 Birthday Honours, he became a Knight Grand Cross of the Order (GCMG).

On 6 March 1961, Harrison was made a Knight Commander of the Royal Victorian Order (KCVO).

Diplomatic posts
| Preceded by Sir Geoffrey Thompson | British Ambassador to Brazil; 1956–1958 | Succeeded by Sir Geoffrey Wallinger |
| Preceded by Sir Roger Stevens | British Ambassador to Iran; 1958–1963 | Succeeded by Sir Denis Wright |
| Preceded by Sir Humphrey Trevelyan | British Ambassador to the Soviet Union; 1965–1968 | Succeeded by Sir Duncan Wilson |
Government offices
| Preceded by Viscount Hood | Deputy Under Secretary of State for the Foreign Office; 1963–1965 | Succeeded by Sir Bernard Burrows |
