= Hugh Elliott (diplomat) =

Former British diplomat (born 1965)

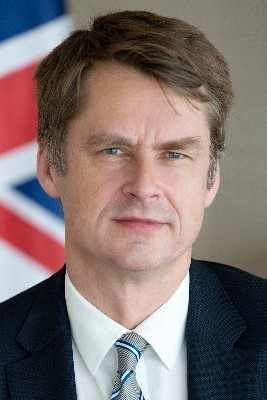

British Ambassador to Spain
- In office August 2019 – 3 September 2024
- Monarchs: Elizabeth II; Charles III
- Prime Minister: Boris Johnson; Liz Truss; Rishi Sunak; Keir Starmer
- Preceded by: Simon Manley
- Succeeded by: Sir Alex Ellis

Personal details
- Born: Hugh Stephen Murray Elliott; 1965 (age 60–61)
- Spouse: María Antonia Martín (m. 1989)
- Children: 2
- Education: Bedford School
- Alma mater: Trinity College, Cambridge
- Occupation: Diplomat

Hugh Stephen Murray Elliott (born 1965) is an executive and former British diplomat who served as Ambassador of the United Kingdom to Spain and non-resident Ambassador Extraordinary to Andorra from 2019 to 2024. Prior to this, he was Director for Communications at the Department for Exiting the European Union. Elliott currently works as executive chairman of Iberdrola Energía Internacional.

== Early life ==
Elliott attended Bedford School from 1973 to 1983, where his father, Tim Elliott, taught Spanish. He then went on to Trinity College, Cambridge, where he read Modern and Medieval Languages.

== Career ==
Elliott joined the Foreign and Commonwealth Office in 1989 as an Assistant Desk Officer for the East Africa Department. In 1991, Elliott was posted to Madrid for five years. From 1996 to 1999 he held various positions in the FCO, including as the Head of the Amsterdam Treaty Unit. He was then posted to Buenos Aires for three years as Head of Economic, Political and Public Affairs. In 2002, he was in Paris as a Counsellor for Global Issues.

From 2006 to 2013, Elliott was the Head of Government Relations at Anglo American, a mining company. In 2013, he returned to the FCO as the Director of Communication, a post which he kept until 2017, when he was made the Director for Europe. In 2017, Elliott was the Director of International Agreements at the FCO and in 2018 he moved to the Department for Exiting the European Union as Director of Communications and Stakeholders.

Elliott took up the post of Ambassador to Spain and non-resident Ambassador Extraordinary to Andorra in August 2019. He presented his letter of credence to King Felipe VI on 5 September 2019.

Elliott has also served as a Trustee of the British Spanish Society and the Chairman of Canning House, an Anglo-Hispanic centre.

In 2020 he was appointed as the Patron of The Royal British Legion in Spain and the British Benevolent Fund.

In April 2023, Deputy Prime Minister and Justice Secretary Dominic Raab resigned after an inquiry into bullying found him to have acted in an "intimidating" and "aggressive" way towards officials. The Telegraph wrote that Elliott was one of the civil servants involved and that the inquiry had upheld a complaint about an incident where Raab's behaviour was concluded to be "unreasonably and persistently aggressive" and "undermining and humiliating". Raab referenced the incident in his resignation letter; it was reported that Raab had recalled Elliot from Spain in November 2020 after it was suspected Elliott had exceeded Cabinet's mandate in negotiations with the Spanish government over the presence of Spanish officers in Gibraltar. While remaining ambassador, Elliot was then replaced in negotiations by Simon Manley, his predecessor.

In March 2024, it was announced that Alex Ellis would be the new ambassador to Spain from summer 2024, with Elliott being transferred to a new post. Elliott left the post in September 2024, with Ellis arriving to replace him the next week.

In January 2025, Elliott took up the post of Executive Chairman of Iberdrola Energía Internacional, a subsidiary of Spanish multinational energy company Iberdrola.

== Personal life ==
In 1989, Elliott married María Antonia Martín and has two children, both of whom were born in Madrid. He enjoys cricket and has played at the Cartama Oval in Málaga.

== See also ==
- Embassy of the United Kingdom, Madrid
