= Chigwell School =

Public school in Essex, England

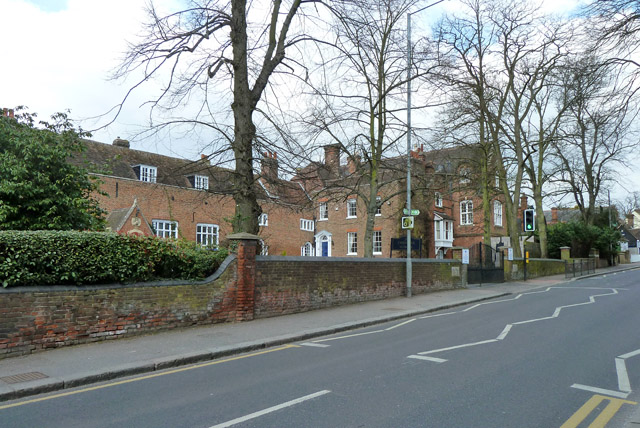

Location
- Chigwell, Essex, IG7 6QF; England; 51°37′30″N 0°04′52″E

Information
- Type: Private day and boarding
- Motto: aut viam inveniam aut faciam (Find a way, or make a way)
- Religious affiliation: Church of England
- Established: 1629; 397 years ago
- Founder: Samuel Harsnett
- Department for Education URN: 115392 Tables
- Headmaster: Damian King (2022)
- Age: 4 to 18
- Enrolment: 1040
- Houses: (Senior School); Caswalls'; Lambourne; Penn's; Swallow's (Junior School); Windsors; Stuarts, Tudors, Hanovers.
- Alumni: Old Chigwellians
- Website: www.chigwell-school.org

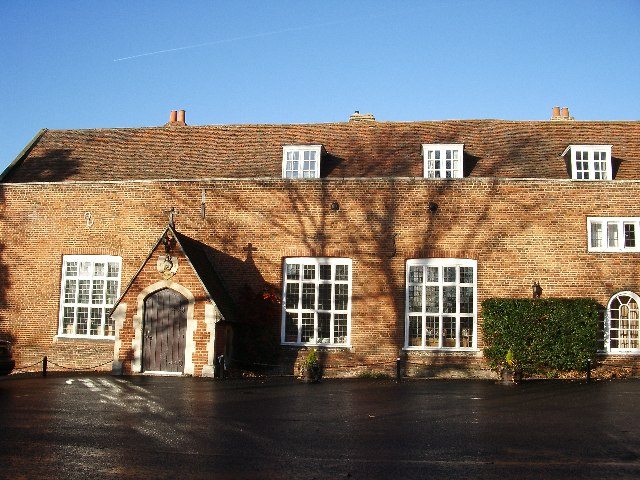
Chigwell School

Chigwell School is a co-educational independent boarding and day school. It is a private school in Chigwell, in the Epping Forest district of Essex. It consists of a Pre Prep (ages 4–7), Prep School (ages 7–11), Senior School (ages 11–16) and Sixth Form. A pre-preparatory department for children aged 4–7 was constructed starting for the 2013–14 academic year.

The school is situated in 100 acres (40 hectares) of land between Epping Forest and Hainault Forest, ten miles (sixteen kilometres) from London. It is a member of the Headmasters' and Headmistresses' Conference (HMC) and the Junior School is a member of the Independent Association of Prep Schools (IAPS).

The school motto is aut viam inveniam aut faciam, a Latin phrase which translates literally as “I shall either find a way or make one”.

== History ==
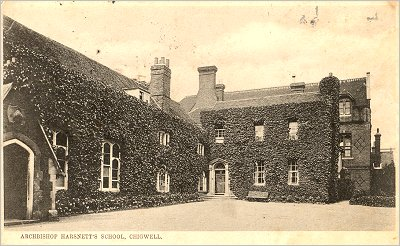
Chigwell School in 1904

Chigwell School dates back to 1619 when a schoolhouse was erected on the site. The first headmaster Peter Mease was appointed in 1623. It was formally founded in 1629 by Samuel Harsnett, Archbishop of York and Vice-Chancellor of Cambridge University, and began with 16 "poor, clever" scholars.

In 1868, the school was split into two sections. The English section for local children studying arithmetic, reading and writing was housed in a building behind the King's Head public house, which was mentioned in Charles Dickens' novel Barnaby Rudge: A Tale of the Riots of 'Eighty. The Latin section (for Latin scholars only) remained in the original building. Rather unusually for a boys' school at that time, in 1873, it started a bursary programme for girls to attend other schools.

Bernard Williams, philosopher, who attended the school, said that "It should have been a direct grant grammar school, but it had a boarding element so that in 1944 when the Education Act came in, the then headmaster – a very unintellectual man whom I very much disliked – made a characteristically wrong decision and turned it into a very minor public school".

Following a trend set by many HMC schools (which were mainly all-boys), the Sixth Form section became coeducational and its first girls were admitted in the summer term of 1974. In 1997 coeducation was extended to the rest of the school.

== Chapel ==
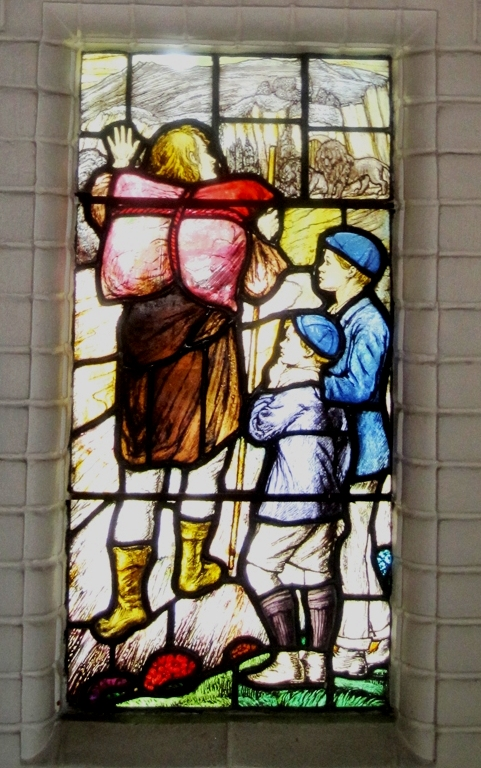
Chigwell School Chapel -Pilgrim's Progress

The War Memorial Chapel was dedicated by the Bishop of Chelmsford on 10 October 1924 to the 78 Old Boys and one Master who had lain down their lives in the Great War and on each side of the altar, plaques record the names of the dead. There were only a total of 80 boys attending the school in 1914. Reginald Hallward took the theme of the Pilgrim's Progress for the windows of the chapel. He depicted schoolboys as Christian's companions on his pilgrimage.

== Notable alumni ==
- Peter Beckingham, Ambassador to the Philippines from 2005 till 2009
- Prof Sir John Boardman, classical archaeologist
- Ken Campbell, actor
- Edward Caswall, classical scholar and writer of hymns, music master at Chigwell.
- Peter Collecott CMG, Ambassador to Brazil from 2004-8
- Tim Collins, Conservative politician, MP for Westmorland and Lonsdale from 1997–2005
- William Cotton, Governor of the Bank of England
- Sir Richard Dales KCVO, CMG, former Ambassador to Norway from 1998–2002
- Paul S Farmer (1961–68), former Headmaster of London comprehensive schools; developed use of pop music in schools, including the first CSE examination in pop music
- Vice-Adm Sir Robert Gerken KCB CBE, Captain of the Fleet from 1978–81
- Sir Arthur Grimble, colonial governor
- Sir Austin Bradford Hill, pioneering medical researcher who discovered the link between smoking and cancer
- Steriker Hare, cricketer
- Ian Holm, actor
- Anthony Hossack (1882–1886) England footballer of the 1890s.
- George Kenneth McKee, orthopaedist and one of the pioneers of hip replacement surgery
- William Penn, Quaker leader and founder of the state of Pennsylvania in the United States of America
- Sir David Pepper, Director of GCHQ from 2003-8
- Eddie Piller, DJ, Music Producer, Radio Broadcaster and Founder, Acid Jazz Records
- Ben Shephard, television presenter
- Horace Smith, poet
- Jordan Spence, footballer, Ipswich Town 2017
- Rt Rev Tim Stevens, Bishop of Leicester from 1991 until 1999
- Col Bob Stewart MP DSO
- Sir Edward Albert Stone, Chief Justice of Western Australia, 1901–06
- Michael Thomas, former Attorney General of Hong Kong
- Sir Colin Thornton-Kemsley, MP for Kincardine and Western Aberdeenshire from 1939–50 and North Angus and Mearns from 1950–64
- Barney Walsh, actor and television presenter
- Bernard Williams, philosopher and Provost of King's College, Cambridge
- Prof Nicholas Williams, scholar of the Irish and Cornish languages.
- Alan Winnington, British communist, journalist, anthropologist, war correspondent

== Headmasters ==
- Anthony Little (1989–1996)
- David Gibbs (1996–2007)
- Michael Punt (2007–2022)
- Damian King (2022–present)

== Notable masters ==
- Robert James, headmaster 1939–1946, later High Master of St Paul's School and headmaster of Harrow School
- Anthony Little, headmaster 1989–1996, later headmaster of Eton College from 2002–2015.
- William Henry Monk, music master, and author of the music to Abide With Me.
