= David Hildyard =

David Hildyard may refer to:

- David Hildyard (sound engineer) (1916–2008), English sound engineer
- Sir David Hildyard (diplomat) (1916–1997), British diplomat
