= Michael Shifter =

American writer

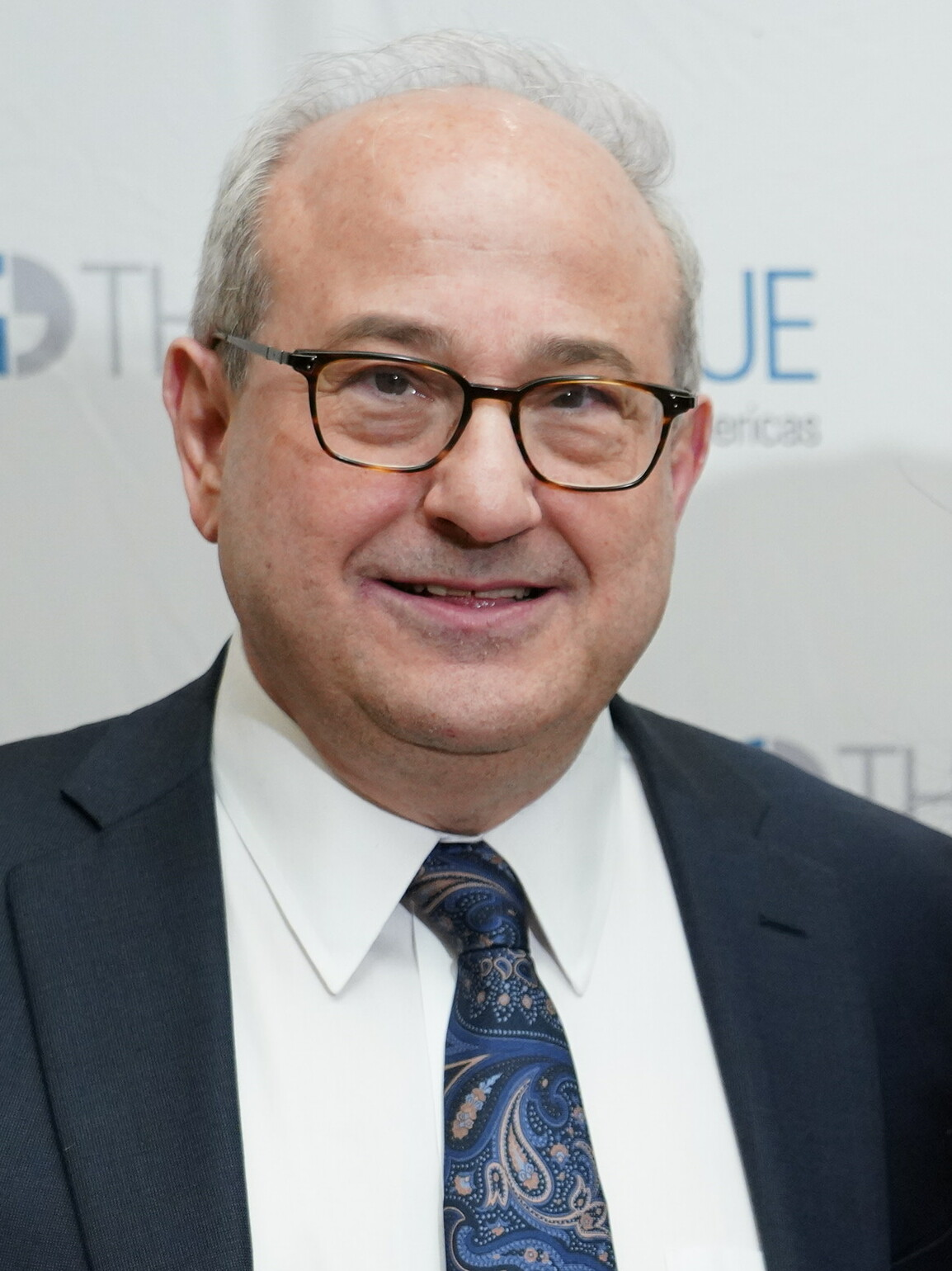

President of the Inter-American Dialogue
- In office April 2010 – April 25, 2022
- Preceded by: Peter Hakim
- Succeeded by: Rebecca Bill Chavez

Personal details
- Education: Oberlin College (BA); Harvard University (MA)

Michael E. Shifter is the former president of the Inter-American Dialogue and an adjunct professor of Latin American studies at Georgetown University's School of Foreign Service. He is a member of the Council on Foreign Relations and writes for the council's journal Foreign Affairs. He is also a member of the Latin American Studies Association (LASA), and a contributing editor to Current History.

Shifter has served on the board of directors of the Washington Office on Latin America (WOLA), the advisory committee of Human Rights Watch in the Americas Division, and the advisory board of the Institute of Latin American and Iberian Studies at Columbia University, as well as the Social Science Foundation of the Graduate School of International Relations at the University of Denver.

Shifter writes and talks widely on US-Latin American relations and hemispheric affairs. His recent articles have appeared in The New York Times, The Washington Post, The Los Angeles Times, Miami Herald, Journal of Democracy, Harvard International Review, and other publications. His writings on democratic governance, multilateralism, drug policy, security issues, and politics in the Andean countries have also been published in many Latin American newspapers and magazines, including Argentina, Chile, Mexico, Colombia, Peru, Guatemala, Panama, and Jamaica. He is co-editor, along with Jorge Domínguez, of Constructing Democratic Governance in Latin America, published by Johns Hopkins University Press and now in its third edition. Shifter has lectured about hemispheric policy at leading universities in Latin America and Europe.

== Education ==
Shifter graduated Phi Beta Kappa and summa cum laude from Oberlin College, Ohio, and then completed a master's degree in sociology at Harvard University where he taught Latin American development and politics for four years.

== Career ==
Before joining the Inter-American Dialogue, Shifter directed the Latin American and Caribbean program at the National Endowment for Democracy from January 1993 to March 1994. Before that, starting in 1987, he directed the Ford Foundation's governance and human rights program in the Andean region and Southern Cone, where he was based, first, in Lima, Peru and then in Santiago, Chile. In the mid-1980s, he was a representative in Brazil with the Inter-American Foundation, where he also worked in the Office of Research and Evaluation.

He has consulted for the Ford Foundation, Kellogg Foundation, Inter-American Development Bank, World Bank, Agency for International Development, Oxfam America, and the Swedish International Development Agency. In 2000, Mr. Shifter directed an independent task force on US policy towards Colombia, organized by the Dialogue and the Council on Foreign Relations and co-chaired by Senator Bob Graham (D-Fl) and former national security adviser Brent Scowcroft. Mr. Shifter is regularly interviewed by a variety of both US and Latin American media, and often appears on CNN and BBC. Since 1993, Shifter has been adjunct professor at Georgetown University's School of Foreign Service, where he teaches Latin American politics. Since 1994, Shifter has played a major role in shaping the Dialogue's agenda, commissioning policy-relevant articles and reports as well as implementing the organization's program strategy in relation to the Andean countries. Since 1996, he has testified regularly before Congress about US policy towards Latin America.

== Publications ==
- With Jorge Domínguez, eds (2008), Constructing Democratic Governance in Latin America, Johns Hopkins University Press. ISBN 0-8018-9004-7
