= Peter Wilson (diplomat) =

British diplomat (born 1968)

His Excellency The Honourable Peter Wilson CMG
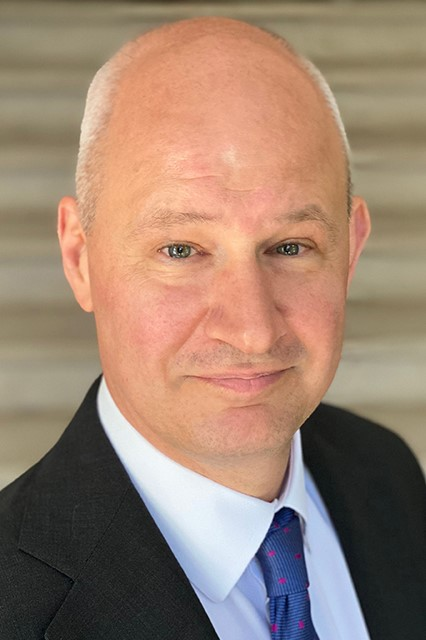

British Ambassador to China
- Incumbent
- Assumed office August 2025
- Monarch: Charles III
- Prime Minister: Keir Starmer; Andy Burnham
- Preceded by: Dame Caroline Wilson

Principal Private Secretary to the Prime Minister
- In office 8 March 2022 – 6 September 2022
- Monarch: Elizabeth II
- Prime Minister: Boris Johnson
- Preceded by: Martin Reynolds
- Succeeded by: Nick Catsaras

British Ambassador to Brazil
- In office January 2021 – March 2022
- Appointed by: Elizabeth II
- Monarch: Elizabeth II
- Prime Minister: Boris Johnson
- Preceded by: Vijay Rangarajan
- Succeeded by: Stephanie Al-Qaq

British Ambassador to the Netherlands
- In office August 2017 – September 2020
- Monarch: Elizabeth II
- Prime Minister: Theresa May; Boris Johnson
- Preceded by: Geoffrey Adams
- Succeeded by: Joanna Roper

Personal details
- Born: Peter Michael Alexander Wilson; 31 March 1968 (age 58)
- Children: 3
- Parent: David Wilson, Baron Wilson of Tillyorn (father)
- Education: Eton College
- Alma mater: Merton College, Oxford; Harvard University

Peter Michael Alexander Wilson CMG (born 31 March 1968) is a civil servant who has served as British Ambassador to China since August 2025. Prior to arriving in China he served as Director General Europe in the FCDO. He has also served as British Ambassador to Brazil, British Ambassador to the Netherlands, Permanent Representative of the United Kingdom to the Organisation for the Prohibition of Chemical Weapons, and Principal Private Secretary to the Prime Minister of the United Kingdom.

== Early life ==
Wilson is a son of David Wilson, Baron Wilson of Tillyorn, the penultimate governor of Hong Kong. He was educated at Eton College and Merton College, Oxford. He also has a MPA degree from the Harvard Kennedy School at Harvard University.

== Career ==
Wilson joined the Foreign and Commonwealth Office (FCO) in 1992 and was posted to Beijing where he studied Mandarin at the University of International Business and Economics. He served at the British embassy in Beijing 1995–98. In early 1999 he was appointed to the cabinet of Sir Leon Brittan, who was a Vice-President of the European Commission. After Brittan resigned with the rest of the Santer Commission in March 1999, Wilson continued as First Secretary at the UK representation to the EU. He was head of the Strategic Policy Team at the FCO 2003–04; Political Counsellor at Islamabad 2005–06 and at Beijing 2007–10; and Director, Asia Pacific, at the FCO 2010–13. He was deputy permanent representative to the United Nations (with the rank of ambassador) 2013–17.

In January 2017, the FCO announced Wilson's appointment as Ambassador to the Netherlands. He took up the post when King Willem-Alexander received his credentials on 23 August 2017. On 30 August that same year he presented his credentials to the Organisation for the Prohibition of Chemical Weapons. In January 2021 he was appointed Ambassador to Brazil.

In March 2022, Wilson was announced as Principal Private Secretary to the Prime Minister of the United Kingdom, filling the vacancy that had been left by Martin Reynolds' resignation earlier that year. However, Wilson vacated the role after six months when Liz Truss became Prime Minister on 6 September 2022 and appointed Nick Catsaras as her new Principal Private Secretary. From March 2023 to August 2024 Wilson served as Director General Europe in the FCDO.

In May 2025, Wilson was announced as the next Ambassador to the People's Republic of China commencing in August 2025.

== Personal life ==
Wilson is married and has three children.

== Honours ==
Wilson was appointed a Companion of the Order of St Michael and St George (CMG) in the 2013 Birthday Honours "for services to strengthening British foreign policy in Asia".

Diplomatic posts
Preceded by Sir Geoffrey Adams	British Ambassador to the Netherlands; 2017–2020	Succeeded by Joanna Roper
Preceded by Vijay Rangarajan	British Ambassador to Brazil; 2021–2022	Succeeded by Stephanie Al-Qaq
Government offices
Preceded by Martin Reynolds	Principal Private Secretary to the Prime Minister; 2022	Succeeded by Nick Catsaras
