= Frederick Mason (diplomat) =

British diplomat (1913–2008)

Sir Frederick Mason KCVO CMG

Permanent Representative to the WTO and UN in Geneva
- In office 1971–1973
- Monarch: Elizabeth II
- Prime Minister: Edward Heath
- Succeeded by: Sir David Hildyard

British Ambassador to Chile
- In office 1966–1970
- Monarch: Elizabeth II
- Prime Minister: Harold Wilson

Personal details
- Born: 15 May 1913
- Died: 18 January 2008 (aged 94)
- Spouse: Karen Rorholm
- Education: City of London School; St Catharine's College, Cambridge
- Occupation: Diplomat

Sir Frederick Cecil Mason KCVO CMG (15 May 1913 – 18 January 2008) was a British diplomat.

During the Second World War, the British occupied the Danish Faroe Islands following Nazi Germany's invasion of Denmark, with Mason serving as the British Consul to the Faroe Islands. He married a local woman, Karen Rorholm. They subsequently left the Faroe Islands. In 1943, he was appointed British Consul in Colón, Panama, and in 1947 Consul in Santiago. In 1960 when he was appointed a Companion of the Order of St Michael and St George (CMG) in the 1960 Birthday Honours he was Economic Counsellor in Tehran. He would later, as Sir Frederick Mason CMG, become British Ambassador to Chile (1966–1970) and finally British Permanent Representative to the Geneva Office of the United Nations (1971–1973).

Mason was appointed a Knight Commander of the Royal Victorian Order (KCVO) in December 1968, following the Queen's visit to Chile in November of that year.
