= Simon Manley =

British diplomat

His Excellency Sir Simon Manley KCMG
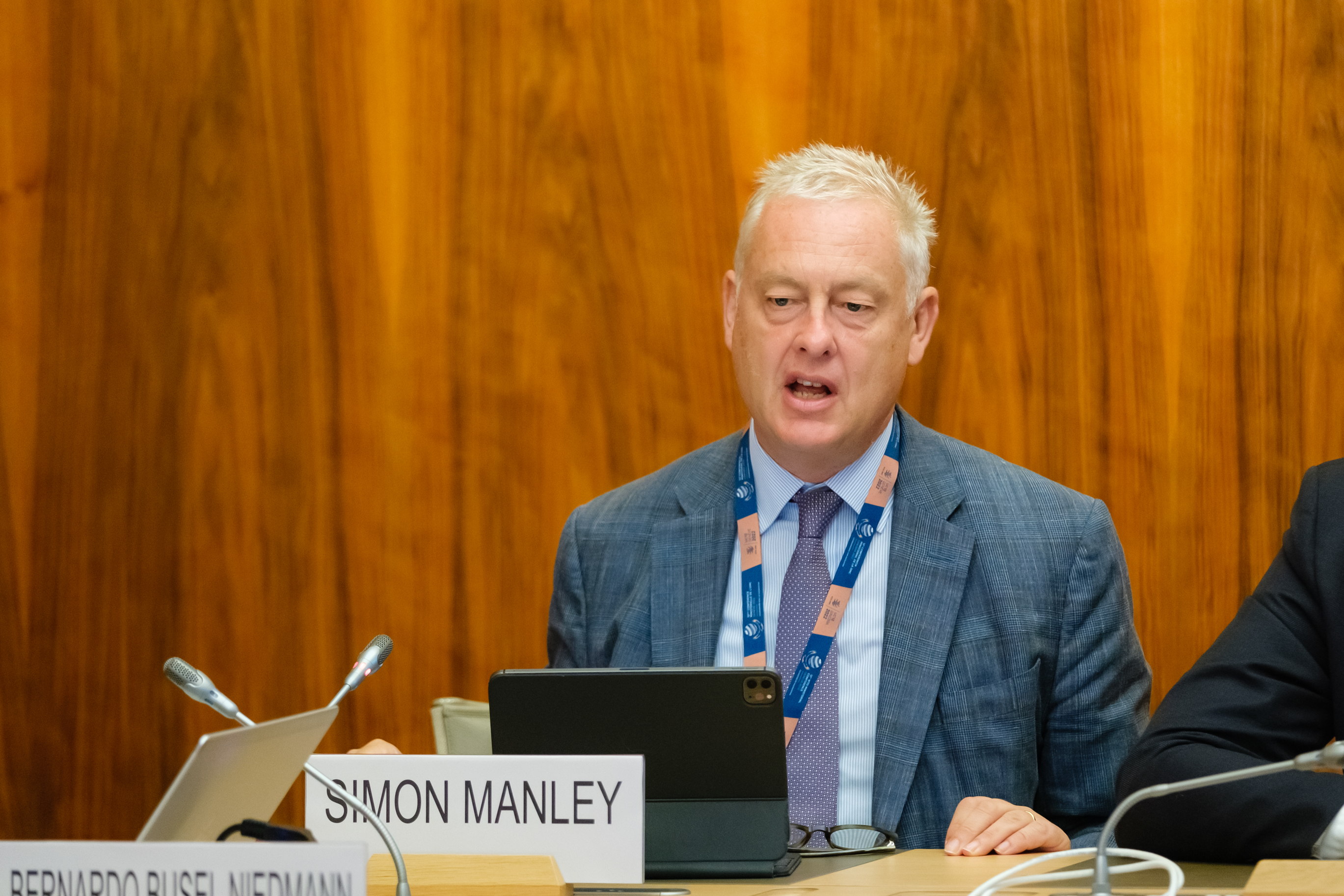

Permanent Representative to the WTO and UN in Geneva
- In office April 2021 – July 2025
- Monarchs: Elizabeth II; Charles III
- Prime Minister: Boris Johnson; Liz Truss; Rishi Sunak; Keir Starmer
- Preceded by: Julian Braithwaite
- Succeeded by: Kumar Iyer

Her Majesty's Ambassador to Spain
- In office October 2013 – August 2019
- Monarch: Elizabeth II
- Prime Minister: David Cameron; Theresa May; Boris Johnson
- Preceded by: Giles Paxman
- Succeeded by: Hugh Elliott

Personal details
- Born: Simon John Manley; 18 September 1967 (age 59) United Kingdom
- Children: 3
- Education: Magdalen College, Oxford; Yale University

Sir Simon John Manley KCMG (born 18 September 1967) is a British diplomat, recently the UK Permanent Representative to the WTO and UN in Geneva and previously Ambassador to Spain from October 2013 to August 2019.

== Early life ==
Manley was educated at Montpelier Primary School, Latymer Upper School, Magdalen College Oxford and Yale University.

== Career ==
Manley joined the Foreign & Commonwealth Office (FCO) in 1990. Before his posting to Madrid, he served as Director Europe at the FCO (2011–2013), responsible for policy toward the EU. He has been posted to the UK's Mission to the United Nations in New York City (1993–1998), where he worked on Yugoslavia and UN reform, and has twice been seconded to the European Union: to the European Commission (2003) and to the Council of the EU (1998–2002).

In March 2020 Manley was appointed Director-General for COVID-19 at the Foreign & Commonwealth Office, leading and coordinating HMG's coronavirus rollout.

In June 2023 the World Trade Organisation's Trade and Gender Informal Working Group published its 2023-2024 plan. Manley and Clara Manuela da Luz Delgado Jesus were new, joining El Salvador's Ana Patricia Benedetti Zelaya, as co-chairs of the Working Group. They replaced Athaliah Lesiba Molokomme and Einar Gunnarsson.
