= Alex Ellis (diplomat) =

British diplomat

His Excellency Sir Alex Ellis KCMG
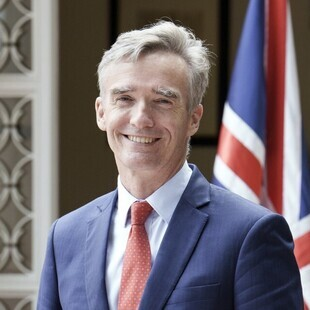
- Sir Alex Ellis

British Ambassador to Spain
- Incumbent
- Assumed office 9 September 2024
- Monarch: Charles III
- Prime Minister: Keir Starmer; Andy Burnham
- Preceded by: Hugh Elliott

British High Commissioner to India
- In office 2021–2024
- Monarchs: Elizabeth II; Charles III
- Prime Minister: Boris Johnson; Liz Truss; Rishi Sunak
- Preceded by: Sir Philip Barton
- Succeeded by: Lindy Cameron

British Ambassador to Brazil
- In office 2013–2017
- Monarch: Elizabeth II
- Prime Minister: David Cameron; Theresa May
- Preceded by: Alan Charlton
- Succeeded by: Vijay Rangarajan

British Ambassador to Portugal
- In office 2007–2011
- Monarch: Elizabeth II
- Prime Minister: Gordon Brown; David Cameron
- Preceded by: John Buck
- Succeeded by: Jill Gallard

Personal details
- Born: Alexander Wykeham Ellis; 5 June 1967 (age 59) London, United Kingdom
- Spouse: Teresa Adegas
- Children: 1
- Education: Magdalene College, Cambridge

Sir Alexander Wykeham Ellis, KCMG (born 5 June 1967) is a British diplomat who has served as British Ambassador to Spain since September 2024. He has previously been High Commissioner to India, Ambassador to Brazil and before that Ambassador to Portugal. In addition, he was the Deputy National Security Adviser for the Integrated Review on diplomacy, development and defence. He also served as Director General of the Department for Exiting the EU.

== Early life ==
Ellis was educated at the Dragon School in Oxford, then at Winchester College and subsequently at Magdalene College, Cambridge.

== Career ==
Ellis taught history at St Edward's School, Oxford, before joining the Foreign and Commonwealth Office (FCO) in 1990. He was British ambassador to Portugal 2007–10 and Director of Strategy at the FCO 2011–13 before being appointed ambassador to Brazil. In November 2016 it was announced that Ellis would become Director General at the Department for Exiting the European Union.

== Honours ==
Ellis was appointed as a Companion of the Order of St Michael and St George (CMG) in the 2013 Queen's Birthday Honours. Subsequently, he was promoted to Knight Commander of the Order (KCMG) in the King's Birthday Honours for 2024.

Diplomatic posts
Preceded by John Buck	British Ambassador to Portugal; 2007–2010	Succeeded by Jill Gallard
Preceded by Alan Charlton	British Ambassador to Brazil; 2013–2017	Succeeded by Vijay Rangarajan
Preceded by Sir Philip Barton	British High Commissioner to India; 2021–2024	Succeeded by Lindy Cameron
Preceded by Hugh Elliott	British Ambassador to Spain; 2024–present	Incumbent
