= Stephanie Al-Qaq =

British diplomat (born 1976)

Her Excellency Stephanie Al-Qaq CMG
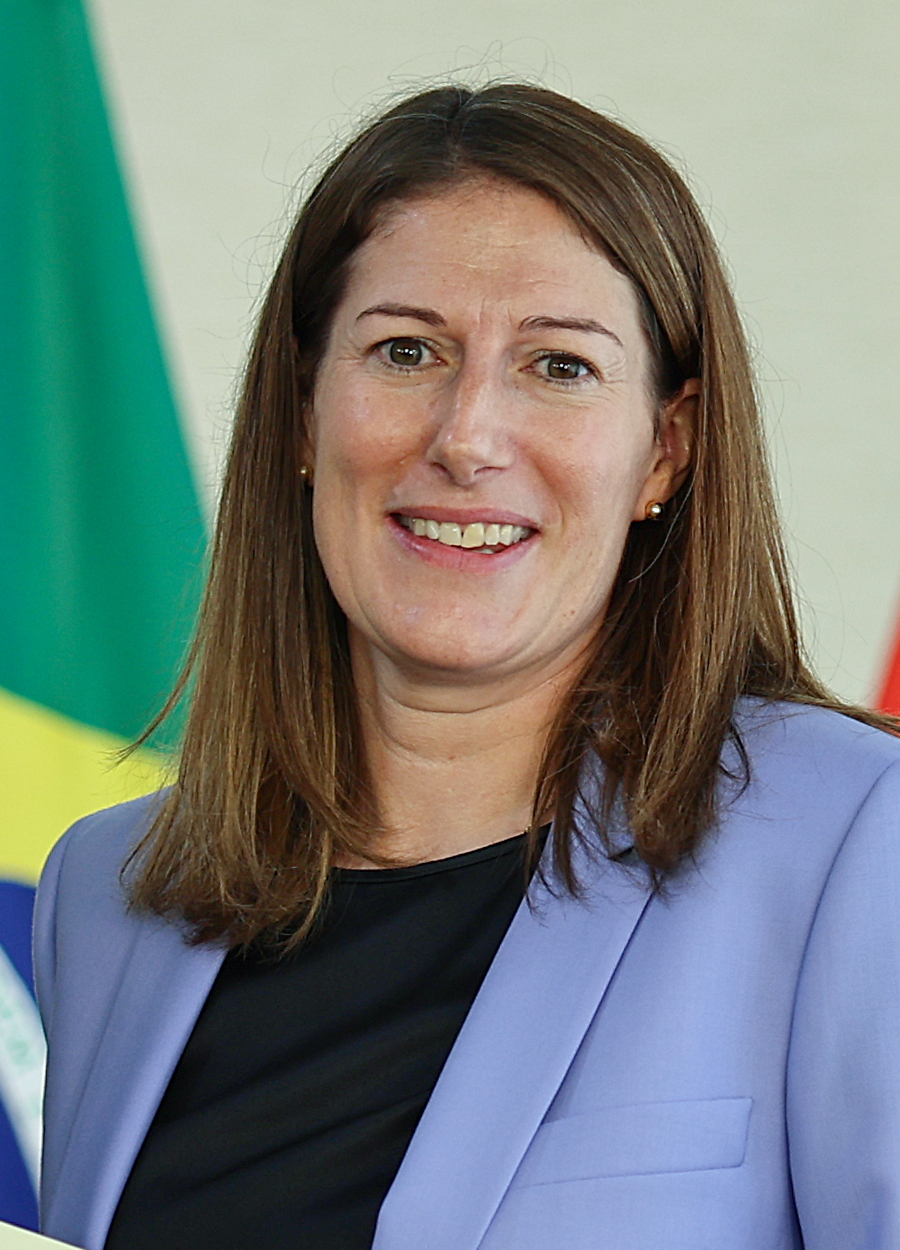
- Official portrait, 2023

British Ambassador to Brazil
- Incumbent
- Assumed office November 2022
- Monarch: Charles III
- Prime Minister: Rishi Sunak; Keir Starmer; Andy Burnham
- Preceded by: Peter Wilson

Personal details
- Born: 3 March 1976 (age 50)
- Spouse: Kareem Al-Qaq
- Children: 3
- Education: University of Birmingham; University of London
- Occupation: Diplomat

Stephanie Jane Al-Qaq CMG (born 3 March 1976) is a British diplomat who has served as British Ambassador to Brazil since 2022. She previously served as the Iran Envoy and Director of Iran and Regional Security in 2022.

== Early life and education ==
Al-Qaq was born on 3 March 1976. She is a graduate of the University of Birmingham and the School of Oriental and African studies, University of London.

== Career ==
Between 1998 and 2002, Al-Qaq worked for several corporate, non-governmental and governmental organisations including Reuters, Amnesty International, Human Rights Watch, the House of Commons and the Department for International Development where she worked in several countries in the Middle East, Europe and in the Americas.

Al-Qaq joined the Foreign and Commonwealth Office in 2002 and was a Desk Officer for Counter Narcotics until 2003. She was then a Desk Officer for Iraq from 2003 to 2004 and from 2004 to 2006 was the Assistant Private Secretary to the Minister of State for the Middle East, Counter Terrorism and Consular.

Al-Qaq was a political counsellor in Brazil from 2007 to 2012 and a Minister Counsellor in Mexico City from 2013 to 2015. She was Deputy Head of Mission to Abu Dhabi from 2015 to 2019, Director of the Middle East and North Africa Directorate from 2019 to 2021 and Iran Envoy and Director of Iran and Regional Security in 2022. She became the British Ambassador to Brazil in November 2022, succeeding Peter Wilson.

== Personal life ==
She is married to political scientist Dr Kareem Richard Al-Qaq with whom she has three children.

== Honours ==
She became a Companion of the Order of St Michael and St George in the 2023 New Year Honours for services to British Foreign Policy.
