= L. Enrique Garcia =

Bolivian economist

Luis Enrique García Rodríguez
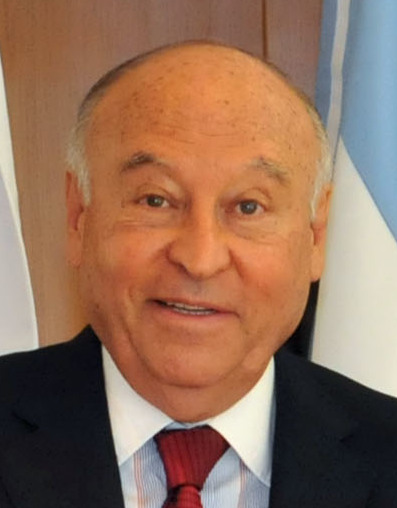

President of CAF – Development Bank of Latin America and the Caribbean
- In office December 1991 – March 2017
- Preceded by: Galo Montaño Pérez
- Succeeded by: Luis Carranza Ugarte

Personal details
- Born: La Paz, Bolivia
- Education: Saint Louis University

Luis Enrique García Rodríguez (born in La Paz, Bolivia) is a Bolivian economist with wide experience in Latin American economic integration and international economic affairs.

== Studies ==
He graduated from Saint Louis University with a BS degree in Economics and Political Science. He also holds an MA degree in Economics and Finance from St. Louis University. He has additional graduate studies in Economics at American University.

== Career ==
Since 2017, he is President of the Council of International Relations for Latin America (RIAL), Chairman of The Trust for the Americas and Co President of The Ibero-American Council for Productivity and Competitiveness (CIPYC). He is also a member of several boards of directors and member of advisory councils internationally. He has been Executive President and CEO of CAF – Development Bank of Latin America and the Caribbean (26 years) from December 1991 to April 2017. Between 1989 and 1991 he was Minister of Planning and Coordination and Head of the Economic and Social Cabinet of the Bolivian Council of Ministers. During that time he was Governor of his country to the World Bank, the Inter-American Development Bank and a Member of the Development Committee of the International Monetary Fund and the World Bank. Until 1989 and for seventeen years he worked for the Inter-American Development Bank where he reached the position of Treasurer of the Institution. He has taught economics at the Universidad Mayor de San Andrés and the Universidad Católica, both based in Bolivia and is currently Visiting Professor in practice at the London School of Economics and Visiting Professor at the Universities of Sao Paulo and Normal University in Beijing.

== Memberships ==
- He has been a member of the Inter-American Dialogue since 2000 and is co-vice chair of the Board of Directors.
- He is Vice President of Canning House in London
- He is a Member of the Advisory Board of the Latin American Program at the Woodrow Wilson Center
- He is a Member of the Advisory Board of the Center for Latin American Studies of Georgetown University
- He is a Member of the Preeminent Personalities Group of the Atlantic Basin Initiative
- He is a Member of the Bolivian National Academy of Economical Sciences.
- He is a Member The Keough School Advisory Council of the University of Notre Dame

== Awards ==
He has been awarded high degree decorations by the Governments of Argentina, Bolivia, Brazil, Colombia, Ecuador, Panama, Paraguay, Peru, Venezuela, Uruguay, Spain, and the Sovereign Order of Malta as well as by several legislative bodies and international media and international organizations.

- On November 16, 2016, he was awarded the Distinguished Lifetime Achievement Award from the Inter-American Dialogue.
- In 2018, he was awarded the “Enrique V. Iglesias” business award. The award was presented by King Felipe VI of Spain during the VVXI Ibero-American Summit in Guatemala.

== Bibliography ==
- L. Enrique García (1983). Cooperation Between Development and Commercial Banks: Some Reflections in the Context of the Present Crisis. Inter-American Development Bank.
- Rodrigo Bolaños; Guillermo Calvo; Ana María Carrasquilla; et al. (20 April 2015). Building a Latin American Reserve Fund: 35 Years of FLAR. Fondo Latinoamericano De Reservas. ISBN 978-958-58648-1-8.
