= Peter Hakim =

American economist

Peter Hakim (born c. 1942) is president emeritus and senior fellow of the Inter-American Dialogue, a Washington-based think tank on Western Hemisphere affairs. He served as president of the Dialogue from 1993 to 2010.

== Professional ==
Hakim writes and speaks widely on hemispheric issues, and has testified more than a dozen times before Congress. His articles have appeared in Foreign Affairs, Foreign Policy, The New York Times, The Washington Post, Miami Herald, Los Angeles Times, and Financial Times, and in newspapers and journals in Argentina, Brazil, Chile, Colombia, Mexico, Peru, and other Latin American nations. He is a regular guest on CNN, BBC, CBS, CNN en Español and other prominent news stations around the world. He wrote a monthly column for the Christian Science Monitor for nearly ten years, and now serves as a board member of Foreign Affairs Latinoamerica and editorial advisor to Americaeconomia, where he also publishes a regular column.

== Background ==
Hakim was a vice president of the Inter-American Foundation and worked for the Ford Foundation in New York and Latin America (in Argentina, Brazil, Chile and Peru). He has taught at MIT and Columbia University. He has served on boards and advisory committees for the World Bank, Council on Competitiveness, Inter-American Development Bank, Canadian Foundation for Latin America (FOCAL), Partners for Democratic Change, and Human Rights Watch. He is a member of the Council on Foreign Relations.

== Education ==
Hakim earned a B.A. at Cornell University (1964), an M.S. in physics at the University of Pennsylvania, and a Master of Public and International Affairs at Princeton University's Woodrow Wilson School.
