= Kumar Iyer =

British economist and diplomat

His Excellency Kumar Iyer CMG
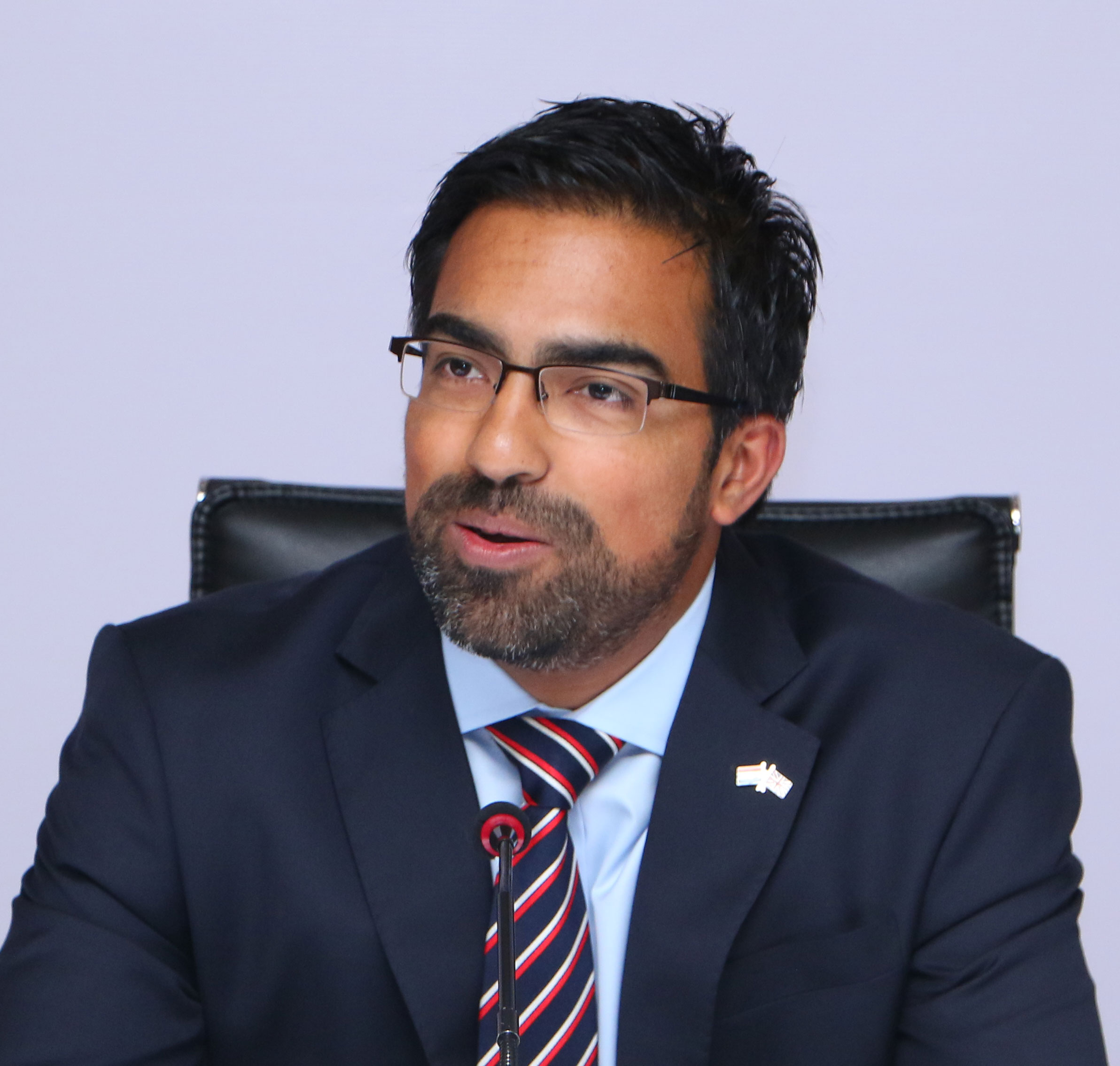

Permanent Representative to the WTO and UN in Geneva
- Incumbent
- Assumed office July 2025
- Monarch: Charles III
- Prime Minister: Keir Starmer
- Preceded by: Simon Manley

Personal details
- Children: 2
- Education: Durham University; Corpus Christi College, Cambridge; Harvard University

Kumar Sabapathy Iyer CMG is a British economist and diplomat. He is currently the United Kingdom’s Ambassador & Permanent Representative to the United Nations, World Trade Organisation and other International Organisations based in Geneva.

The UK’s Ambassador and Permanent Representative oversees the work of the UK Mission in Geneva and represents the United Kingdom in its engagement with over 35 international organisations, agencies and offices based in the city. These include the UN Human Rights Council, the World Trade Organization, the World Health Organization, the UN High Commissioner for Refugees, the International Telecommunication Union, the World Intellectual Property Office, the Conference on Disarmament, United Nations Office for the Coordination of Humanitarian Affairs, CERN, and the World Economic Forum.

His career has been split between the private sector, public sector and academia.

== Early life ==
Born in London, Iyer grew up in India speaking Tamil and Hindi before moving back to England, settling Stoke-on-Trent. Iyer went to school at Blurton High School and then Stoke-on-Trent Sixth Form College. He went on to read economics at Durham University (BA). As an undergraduate he served as President of the Durham Union. He continued his education at Corpus Christi College, Cambridge (MPhil), where he was a Bank of England scholar. He was later a Kennedy Scholar and Teaching Fellow in International Capital Markets at Harvard University.

== Career ==
Iyer joined the civil service, being hired from Boston Consulting Group into the Prime Minister's Strategy Unit in 2008 as part of the UK government's response to the 2008 financial crisis. In 2010 he transferred to HM Treasury as the Deputy Director for Strategy, Planning & Budget, and then as the Head of Financial Sector Interventions.

From 2013 until 2017, Iyer served as India as the FCO's Deputy High Commissioner for Western India, based in Mumbai, and simultaneously as UK Trade & Investment's Director General for Economics, Trade and Commercial Affairs in South Asia, a role currently known as Her Majesty's Trade Commissioner.

After leaving his post in India, Iyer worked as a "Visiting Academic" at Hertford College, Oxford, and as a senior partner in Oliver Wyman. In June 2019, it was announced that Iyer would serve as the Foreign & Commonwealth Office's first chief economist, on the FCO Board. He was consequently the FCO's first ethnic-minority Board member.

Iyer was a Director General in the Prime Minister's COVID-19 Taskforce, after which he was appointed as the Director General Economics, Science and Technology at the FCDO. This was part of structural changes in the Department to meet the immediate and long-term challenges posed by Russia’s invasion of Ukraine. In this role, Iyer coordinated international economic policy, including oversight of the UK's sanctions regime – ensuring the FCDO makes full use of all economic tools in its foreign policy.

Prior to his appointment as UK's Ambassador to the UN, Iyer served as a Senior Adviser to the Board and Global Partnership of Clifford Chance.

In July 2025, Iyer was appointed the United Kingdom’s Ambassador & Permanent Representative to the United Nations, World Trade Organisation and other International Organisations based in Geneva.

Iyer was appointed Companion of the Order of St Michael and St George (CMG) in the 2023 Birthday Honours for services to British foreign policy.

== Personal life ==
Iyer married Kathryn Ann Worth, a criminal barrister at Middle Temple in 2004; they have one son and one daughter.
