= Vijay Rangarajan =

British diplomat (born 1969)

Dr Francis Vijay Rangarajan CMG
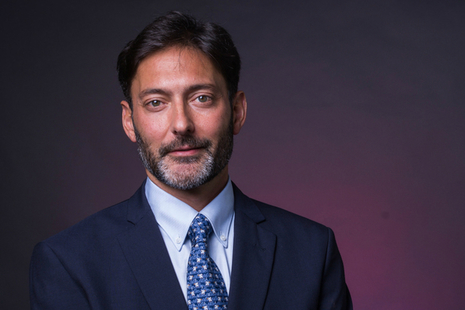

British Ambassador to Brazil
- In office June 2017 – August 2020
- Monarch: Elizabeth II
- Prime Minister: Theresa May; Boris Johnson
- Preceded by: Alex Ellis
- Succeeded by: Peter Wilson

Personal details
- Born: 22 September 1969 (age 57) New Delhi, India
- Children: 2
- Education: Selwyn College, Cambridge

Dr Francis Vijay Rangarajan CMG (born 22 September 1969) is an Indian-born British civil servant who is the Chief Executive of the Electoral Commission. His appointment was announced on 30 January 2024, and he took up the post at the beginning of March 2024. He previously served as the British Ambassador to Brazil from May 2017 to August 2020.

== Early life and education ==
Rangarajan was born in New Delhi, India to Tamil parents, and educated at Cranbrook School and Selwyn College, Cambridge, where he graduated with a BA (Hons) degree in natural sciences in 1990, a Masters degree in maths, and a PhD in Astrophysics in 1995.

== Career ==
Rangarajan worked in the British Representation in Brussels on trade policy and political affairs, later leading the Justice and Home Affairs section, covering immigration, asylum, data sharing, counter-terrorism, civil and criminal law. From 2003 to 2006 he served as the Deputy British Ambassador to Mexico.

He worked in the Ministry of Justice and Cabinet Office on political and constitutional reform of the UK: running elections, Parliament and the development of devolution in the UK. This involved establishing the UK Supreme Court and the Independent Parliamentary Standards Authority, and the reform of electoral registration.

He then set up the FCO’s Multilateral Policy Directorate, responsible for the UN, Council of Europe, Commonwealth, OSCE, and work on international human rights and conflict issues. He also negotiated major changes to the European Convention on Human Rights.

He was Europe Director, responsible for work on the UK EU referendum, associated negotiations, and wider EU policy such as on energy, social security and foreign policy.

From May 2017 to August 2020 he was the British Ambassador to Brazil.

He was a Director General at the Foreign, Commonwealth and Development Office (FCDO) from 2020 to 2024. His role initially focused on the Americas and Overseas Territories, and later on the Indo-Pacific, Middle East and North Africa.

Prior to working for the FCDO, Rangarajan worked for the UK's Ministry of Justice and Cabinet Office, focusing on political and constitutional reform.

== Awards and honours ==
He was made a Companion of the Order of St Michael and St George (CMG) in the 2015 Birthday Honours.
