= List of permanent representatives of the United Kingdom to the United Nations in Geneva =

The United Kingdom's permanent representative to the United Nations and other international organisations in Geneva is the United Kingdom's permanent representative to the United Nations Office at Geneva and other international organisations based in Geneva including the World Trade Organization, the International Organization for Migration, the International Committee of the Red Cross and other non-governmental organizations. Permanent representatives normally hold the personal rank of ambassador.

== List of permanent representatives ==
- 1971–1973: Sir Frederick Mason
- 1973–1976: Sir David Hildyard
- 1976–1978: Sir James Bottomley
- 1979–1983: Sir Peter Marshall
- 1983–1985: Dame Anne Warburton
- 1985–1990: John Sankey
- 1990–1993: Martin Morland
- 1993–1997: Nigel Williams
- 1997–2000: Sir Roderic Lyne
- 2000–2003: Simon Fuller
- 2003–2008: Nicholas Thorne
- 2008–2012: Peter Gooderham
- 2012–2015: Karen Pierce
- 2015–2021: Julian Braithwaite
- 2021–2025: Simon Manley
- 2025–present: Kumar Iyer

== See also ==
- List of permanent representatives of the United Kingdom to the Conference on Disarmament
