= Geoffrey Harington Thompson =

British diplomat

Sir Geoffrey Harington Thompson, GBE, KCMG (12 March 1898 – 26 January 1967) was a British diplomat. He was British Ambassador to Thailand from 1946 to 1950 (Minister from 1946 to 1947) and British Ambassador to Brazil from 1952 to 1956.

== Biography ==
The son of Lieutenant-Colonel Croasdale Miller Thompson, IMS, and Ella Dalziel Harington, Thompson was educated at Eastman's Royal Naval Academy, Southsea and Westminster School. He was commissioned into the Royal Field Artillery (Special Reserve) in 1917, and served in France and Flanders in 1917–18, where he was wounded, and in Rhine in 1919.

He was appointed a Third Secretary HM Diplomatic Service in 1920, transferred to Rio de Janeiro the same year, and to Washington D.C. in 1922. Promoted to Second Secretary in 1923, he was transferred to the Foreign Office in 1927, and to Santiago in 1931, where he acted as chargé d'affaires in 1932 and 1933. Promoted to First Secretary in 1932, he was transferred to the Foreign Office in 1934, and to the British Embassy to Spain in Valencia, then to Hendaye (where it had been evacuated) in 1937; he was chargé d'affaires there in September 1937 and in January–June 1938. Transferred to the Foreign Office in September in 1938, he was attached to the Imperial Defence College from January to October 1939, before returning to the Foreign Office. He was appointed acting Counsellor of Embassy at Ankara in 1941, and transferred to Baghdad in 1942, where he was chargé d'affaires in 1942, 1943, 1944, and 1945. He was promoted to Counsellor in 1943.

In 1946, Thompson was appointed British Minister to Thailand, and became Ambassador when relations were upgraded in 1947, serving there until 1950. From 1950 to 1951, he was a civilian instructor at the Imperial Defence College. He was British Ambassador to Brazil from 1952 to 1956, when he retired.

In retirement, Thompson became a director of Atlas Assurance Company, and published his memoirs, Front-line Diplomat (Hutchinson, 1959).

Thompson was appointed CMG in the 1933 New Year Honours, promoted to KCMG in the 1949 New Year Honours, and appointed a GBE in the 1957 New Year Honours.

== Family ==
Thompson married in 1926 Louise Sewall of Englewood, New Jersey; they had a son and a daughter. The marriage was dissolved in 1943, when he married Hilda Alice, daughter of the Rev. D. Westcott, DD.

Diplomatic posts
Preceded by No representation	British Minister/Ambassador to Thailand; 1945-1950	Succeeded by John Hall Magowan
Preceded by Nevile Butler	British Ambassador to Brazil; 1952-1956	Succeeded by Geoffrey Harrison
