= Duncan Wilson =

Duncan Wilson may refer to:

- Duncan Wilson (diplomat), British diplomat and master of Corpus Christi College, Cambridge
- Duncan Wilson (heritage administrator), chief executive of Historic England
- Duncan Wilson (politician), Canadian politician
