= Peter Collecott =

British diplomat

Peter Salmon Collecott, CMG, is a British former diplomat. He was the British Ambassador to Brazil from 2004 to 2008.

He is chairman of the Ambassadors Partnership.

== Early life ==
Born on 8 October 1950 in Chingford, Essex, Collecott is the son of George William Collecott and his wife Nancie Alice Salmon. He was educated at Chigwell School and St John's College, Cambridge, where he graduated BA in the Mathematical Tripos in 1972. He went on to earn a PhD degree in theoretical physics at Cambridge in 1976, when his BA was promoted to MA. His work as a physicist is cited.

== Career ==
Collecott entered the Diplomatic Service in 1977. He studied Arabic before a posting as First Secretary (political) in Khartoum in 1980. In 1982, he was posted as First Secretary (Economic/Commercial) to Canberra. From 1986, he was head of the Iran/Iraq Section of the Foreign and Commonwealth Office (FCO), and from 1988 Assistant Head of its European Community Department (External). In September 1989, he was appointed as Counsellor and Head of Chancery at the British embassy in Jakarta. and was later Deputy Head of Mission there. In 1994 he went to Bonn as Counsellor (EU and Economic), returning to the FCO as Director for Resources in 1999. In 2001, he was promoted to Chief Clerk and Director General of Corporate Affairs.

In August 2004, Collecott was appointed as British Ambassador to Brazil and remained in post there until November 2008.

In 2006, Collecott wrote to Michael Levy that his recent visit to Brazil had led to many doors being suddenly opened to British diplomats there, as President Lula now wished to work closely with Tony Blair. He reported that "The Brazilians, from Lula downwards, got the substance they wanted from us".

Writing in The Diplomatic Courier, Collecott has suggested that Brazil's national identity and ambition give it the potential to become a superpower.

Collecott retired from HM Diplomatic Service in 2009 and became a consultant on diplomacy and business. In 2011 he was a founding partner of ADRg Ambassadors LLP, now called the Ambassador Partnership, of which he became chairman in 2016.

Preceded by Sir Roger Bone	British Ambassador to Brazil; 2004–2008	Succeeded by Alan Charlton
