= List of ambassadors of the United Kingdom to Brazil =

British Ambassador to Brazil
- Coat of Arms of the United Kingdom
- Incumbent; Stephanie Al-Qaq since November 2022
- Style: His Excellency
- Residence: Brasília
- Appointer: King Charles III
- Inaugural holder: Sir Henry Chamberlain, 1st Baronet (First Envoy Extraordinary and Minister Plenipotentiary to the Emperor of Brazil); Hugh Wyndham (First Envoy Extraordinary and Minister Plenipotentiary to the United States of Brazil); Sir Ralph Paget (First Ambassador to Brazil)
- Formation: 1826; First Envoy Extraordinary and Minister Plenipotentiary to the Emperor of Brazil; 1891; First Envoy Extraordinary and Minister Plenipotentiary to the United States of Brazil; 1919; First Ambassador to Brazil
- Website: UK and Brazil

The ambassador of the United Kingdom to Brazil is the United Kingdom's foremost diplomatic representative in Brazil and the head of the UK's diplomatic mission in Brazil. The official title is His Britannic Majesty's Ambassador to the Federative Republic of Brazil.

Besides the embassy and consulate-general in Brasília, the UK government is represented by consulates-general in São Paulo, Rio de Janeiro, Recife, and Belo Horizonte.

== List of heads of mission ==
=== Envoys extraordinary and ministers plenipotentiary ===
==== Emperor of Brazil ====
- 1826: Sir Henry Chamberlain, 1st Baronet, consul general and chargé
- 1826–1828: Sir Robert Gordon
- 1828–1832: John, Lord Ponsonby
- 1828: Percy, Viscount Strangford, special mission
- 1832–1835: Stephen Henry Fox
- 1835–1838: Hamilton Charles James Hamilton
- 1838–1847: William Gore Ouseley, chargé
- 1842: Henry Ellis, extraordinary and special mission
- 1847–1850: The Lord Howden
- 1850–1851: James Hudson
- 1851–1853: Henry Southern
- 1853–1855: Henry Francis Howard
- 1855–1858: Peter Campbell Scarlett
- 1859–1863: William Dougal Christie
- 1865–1867: Sir Edward Thornton
- 1867–1879: George Buckley-Mathew
- 1879–1881: Clare Ford
- 1881–1885: Edwin Corbett
- 1885–1888: Hugh MacDonell
- 1888–1891: Hugh Wyndham

==== United States of Brazil ====
- 1891–1894: Hugh Wyndham (later Sir Hugh Wyndham)
- 1894–1900: Constantine Phipps (later Sir Constantine Phipps)
- 1900–1906: Sir Henry Dering, 9th Bt.
- 1906–1915: Sir William Henry Doveton Haggard
- 1915–1919: Sir Arthur Peel

=== Ambassadors ===
- 1919–1921: Sir Ralph Paget
- 1921–1925: Sir John Tilley
- 1925–1930: Sir Beilby Alston
- 1930–1935: Sir William Seeds
- 1935–1939: Sir Hugh Gurney
- 1939–1941: Sir Geoffrey Knox
- 1941–1944: Sir Noel Charles
- 1944–1947: Sir Donald Gainer
- 1947–1952: Sir Nevile Butler
- 1952–1956: Sir Geoffrey Thompson
- 1956–1958: Sir Geoffrey Harrison
- 1958–1963: Sir Geoffrey Wallinger
- 1963–1966: Sir Leslie Fry
- 1966–1969: Sir John Russell
- 1969–1973: Sir David Hunt
- 1973–1977: Sir Derek Dodson
- 1977–1979: Sir Norman Statham
- 1979–1981: George Edmund Hall
- 1981–1984: William Harding (later Sir William Harding)
- 1984–1987: John Ure (later Sir John Ure)
- 1987–1992: Michael Newington
- 1992–1995: Peter Heap (later Sir Peter Heap)
- 1995–1999: Donald Haskell
- 1999–2004: Sir Roger Bone
- 2004–2008: Peter Collecott
- 2008–2013: Alan Charlton
- 2013–2017: Alex Ellis
- 2017–2020: Vijay Rangarajan
- 2021–2022: Peter Wilson
- 2022: Melanie Hopkins (acting)
- 2022–present: Stephanie Al-Qaq

== See also ==
- Brazil–United Kingdom relations
