= James Bottomley (diplomat) =

British diplomat

Sir James Bottomley KCMG
- Sir James Bottomley

Permanent Representative to the WTO and UN in Geneva
- In office 1976–1978
- Monarch: Elizabeth II
- Prime Minister: James Callaghan
- Preceded by: Sir David Hildyard
- Succeeded by: Sir Peter Marshall

British Ambassador to South Africa
- In office 1973–1976
- Preceded by: Sir Arthur Snelling
- Succeeded by: Sir David Scott

Personal details
- Born: 12 January 1920 London
- Died: 5 June 2013 (aged 93)
- Spouse: Barbara Vardon
- Children: 5, including Sir Peter Bottomley
- Education: Trinity College, Cambridge; King's College School
- Occupation: British diplomat

Military service
- Allegiance: United Kingdom
- Branch/service: British Army
- Years of service: 1940–1946
- Unit: Inns of Court Regiment, Royal Armoured Corps

Sir James Reginald Alfred Bottomley, KCMG (12 January 1920 – 5 June 2013) was a British diplomat.

== Biography ==
He was born in London, the son of Sir William Cecil Bottomley, one time Senior Crown Agent, and Alice Bottomley, one time lecturer at the London School of Economics, daughter of Sir Richard Robinson.

Jim Bottomley was a scholar at King's College School and Trinity College, Cambridge; he was Chairman of debates of the Cambridge Union Society in 1940, suspending debates to prevent proctoral censorship. In World War II with a first class degree in classics he served in the Inns of Court Regiment, RAC, 1940–46 and was seriously wounded in chest and face at Pont de Vère near Flers in Normandy in August 1944, requiring two years of surgery to repair his jaw.

He joined the Dominions Office in 1946, which became the Commonwealth Relations Office, and then the Foreign and Commonwealth Office, serving in London, Pretoria (1948–50), as a steward outside Westminster Abbey at the 1953 Coronation before Karachi (1953–55), Washington DC for three years before the UN in New York(1955–59) and Kuala Lumpur (1963–67). In 1968 he undertook a supposedly secret mission to Salisbury, Rhodesia to restart talks with Ian Smith on Rhodesia's unilateral declaration of independence. Member, British Overseas Trade Board, 1972. He was British Ambassador to South Africa 1973–1976, and Permanent UK Representative to the UN and other international Organisations at Geneva 1976–78, at which point he retired from diplomatic service. He was a director of Johnson Matthey plc from 1979–85.

He was appointed Companion of the Order of St Michael and St George (CMG) in the 1965 Birthday Honours, and promoted to Knight Commander of the Order of St Michael and St George (KCMG) in the 1973 New Year Honours.

He married on 23 August 1941, at Cheswardine, Shropshire, Barbara Vardon; they had two daughters and three sons, one of whom died young. The survivors became involved in computing, politics, teaching and statistics. The former Conservative MP Sir Peter Bottomley is his son; the economist and former Labour MP and Treasury Minister Baroness Kitty Ussher is his granddaughter.

Barbara predeceased Jim in 1994 after over 50 years of marriage like some of his ancestors and children. Bottomley survived her until his death, aged 93, in June 2013. After cremation at Cambridge (where the couple moved after his retirement), his ashes were buried in Cheswardine churchyard along with those of his wife and their predeceased son.
