= David Hildyard (diplomat) =

British diplomat (1916–1997)

Sir David Hildyard KCMG DFC

UK Permanent Representative to the United Nations in Geneva
- In office 1973–1976
- Preceded by: Sir Frederick Mason
- Succeeded by: Sir James Bottomley

British Ambassador to Chile
- In office 1970–1973
- Preceded by: Sir Frederick Mason
- Succeeded by: Reginald Secondé

Personal details
- Born: 4 May 1916 London
- Died: 5 April 1997 (aged 80)
- Children: 2
- Education: Christ Church, Oxford
- Occupation: Civil servant and diplomat

Sir David Henry Thoroton Hildyard (4 May 1916 – 5 April 1997) was a British diplomat who served as British Ambassador to Chile from 1970 to 1973 and as UK Permanent Representative to the United Nations in Geneva from 1973 to 1976.

== Early life and education ==
Hildyard was born on 4 May 1916 in London, the son of G. M. T. Hildyard QC and Sybil née Hoare. He was educated at Eton College and Christ Church, Oxford.

== Career ==
After serving with the RAF during World War II in Europe, North Africa and Ceylon, rising to wing commander, Hildyard entered the Foreign Service in 1948, and during the following year was secretary with the British legation at the UN General Assembly in New York. His first posting was to Montevideo as consul in 1950 followed by Madrid in 1953. After working at the Foreign Office, he was appointed counsellor at Mexico City where he served from 1960 to 1965. After serving as head of the economic relations department at the Foreign Office from 1965 to 1968, he was then appointed minister and alternate UK Representative to the UN General Assembly in New York, remaining in the post from 1968 to 1970.

From 1970 to 1973, Hildyard served as Ambassador to Chile. From 1973 to 1976, he was ambassador and Permanent UK Representative to the United Nations in Geneva, and other international organisations in Geneva including head of the UK delegation to the Conference on Security and Co-operation in Europe (CSCE) and the General Agreement on Tariffs and Trade (GATT).

== Personal life and death ==
Hildyard married Millicent (née Baron) in 1947 and they had a son and a daughter.

Hildyard died on 5 April 1997, aged 80.

== Honours ==
Hildyard was appointed Companion of the Order of St Michael and St George (CMG) in the 1966 New Year Honours, and promoted to Knight Commander (KCMG) in the 1975 New Year Honours. In 1943, he was awarded the Distinguished Flying Cross (DFC). He was appointed Grand Officer in the Order of Merit, Chile's highest civil honour.

== See also ==
- Chile–United Kingdom relations

Diplomatic posts
Preceded by Sir Frederick Mason	British Ambassador to Chile; 1970–1973	Succeeded by Reginald Secondé
Preceded by Sir Frederick Mason	UK Permanent Representative to the United Nations in Geneva; 1973–1976	Succeeded by Sir James Bottomley
