= John Stile =

English diplomat

John Stile (fl. 1511) was English ambassador to Spain c.1511, during the reign of Ferdinand of Aragon as king of Spain, and the early reign of Ferdinand's son-in-law, Henry VIII of England. Henry was then married to his first wife, Katherine of Aragon.

Stile went to Spain in 1505, on a diplomatic mission for Henry VII. He was ordered to stay there, making a permanent position; this was the first England resident diplomatic posting, rather than a transient mission, at a secular (i.e. non-papal) court. There are several 'John Styles' who tend to get mixed up. A Sir John Style d.1529 at Estgrenwych may be this 'ambassador' but needs confirmation. He was buried at Allhallows Barking near the Tower of London. If it is so, then this John Style had three wives, Kateryn (died before knighthood?), Dame Elizabeth and Dame Kateryn. The latter had had three husbands but her will as Dame Kateryn in 1531 describes Sir John having been in the wars in Ireland with Thomas the Duke of Norfolk. The wills are accessible through genealogy websites in PCC records. Sources such as Close Rolls can reveal more about 'ambassodor Style'. Letters and papers foreign and domestic of Henry VIII have entries referring to John Stile and Norfolk who was Admiral and lieutenant for Henry in Ireland. Further research is required to confirm this beyond doubt.

Another John Style, a mercer who gets confused died in 1505 (Will at PCC) who mentions in his will Langley and Bekynham(sic) for Beckenham, Kent who was father to Sir Humphrey Style and had married Elizabeth Wolston, daughter of Guy Wolston. Some sources related to this John Style state he bought Langley at Beckenham at a date which has been found to be later than his death. His genealogy is now beyond doubt. He was buried at St. Thomas of Acre, chapel of the London Mercers guild. Subsequently several of his descendants were buried at St.George's church, Beckenham, Kent.
