= Inter-American Dialogue =

American-based think tank

- Abbreviation: IAD
- Formation: 1982; 44 years ago
- Type: Latin America Public Policy Think Tank, Forum of Leaders
- Headquarters: 1155 15th Street NW, Suite 800, Washington, D.C. 20005
- Location: Washington, D.C., U.S.
- President & CEO: Rebecca Bill Chavez
- Co-Chairs: Laura Chinchilla; Thomas A. Shannon Jr.
- Website: thedialogue.org

The Inter-American Dialogue (Spanish and Portuguese: Diálogo Interamericano), also known as the Dialogue or IAD, is an American-based think tank in the field of international affairs primarily related to the Western Hemisphere. Headquartered in Washington, D.C., it intends to "foster democratic governance, prosperity, and social equity in Latin America and the Caribbean". The Dialogue's research areas focus on the rule of law, education, migration, remittances, energy, climate change and extractive industries.

== History ==
The Dialogue originated from the efforts of Abraham F. Lowenthal, who in the late 1970s and early 1980s was the secretary of the Latin America program at the Woodrow Wilson International Center for Scholars. Together with Peter D. Bell, who at that time was engaged in The Latin America program at the Ford Foundation, he approached Sol M. Linowitz, former US Ambassador to the Organization of American States, with an idea to assemble citizens from throughout the hemisphere to set a new regional agenda. Linowitz proposed creation of an "inter-American dialogue". He broached the idea to Galo Plaza, the former president of Ecuador and former secretary general of the Organization of American States.

The Dialogue's first meeting of members took place in 1982 under the auspices of the Aspen Institute. At first the Dialogue did not engage in extensive original research, having only one or two professional full-time staffers. Eventually, Lowenthal raised enough funds to convert the Dialogue into a full-scale think tank with a full-time research staff. This, along with the changes in the world politics, put the Dialogue in the advantageous position to shape Latin America policy of the Clinton administration. By 1993, the Dialogue expanded and diversified its activities to include conferences, working groups, congressional seminars, forums for visiting Latin Americans, and individually authored articles.

In 1993, the Dialogue conducted a research into the role "external actors could play in consolidating, deepening and defending democracy in Western Hemisphere". The timing was deemed appropriate considering "the move of the Eastern Europe and Latin America to democratic government". Advocating "market-based solutions to the reduction of poverty" as the force driving the democratic wave, the Dialogue was eager to foster in Latin America "an economic model fueled by the individual desire to consume and employing market-set prices to coordinate with relative efficiency the supply and demand for goods, services, and capital".

In 2005, the Dialogue released a report on Latin America entitled "A Break in the Clouds", exposing "the many daunting challenges still confronting the region". In 2009, the Dialogue released "A Second Chance: US Policy in the Americas", the report prepared for U.S. policy makers in the wake of the 2008 global financial-economic crisis. The report openly conceded that "popular frustration may lead to diminished support for democracy and markets" throughout both North and Latin America, yet recommended for the United States to quickly "gain congressional ratification of the already negotiated and signed free trade agreements with Colombia and Panama" while preserving "hemisphere-wide free trade" as a "critical long-term goal".

In 2010, Michael Shifter, the former president of the Dialogue, and Jorge Dominguez, Professor and Vice Provost for International Affairs at Harvard University, organized a meeting with the representatives of the Washington political community about democratic institutions and practices in Latin America. In particular, the sessions discussed constitutional reforms made by Latin American presidents, the growing influence of the Executive branch over the Judicial branch in many Latin American countries, corruption in governmental institutions and the challenges that it presents to democracy, advances in terms of social inclusion, the effects of the growing restrictions on the communications media and on opposition parties in some Latin American countries, and organized crime and drug trafficking and the threats that they present to democratic institutions.

By 2015, the Dialogue had become increasingly worried about the Chinese activities in the Latin America. Its analysis showed that China held $65 billion of Venezuelan debt, and that in 2016, 92% of China's loans directed to Latin America went to Ecuador, Venezuela and Brazil. In a 2015 interview Margaret Myers, director of the China and Latin America program at the Dialogue, called the Chinese diplomacy and also Chinese foreign policy "slightly more aggressive" than earlier. She said that "partnerships in the region between China and certain countries that would in some form have been thought to provoke the U.S. in the past [are] no longer seemingly a major consideration".

== Programs ==
The Inter-American Dialogue has five programs that convene events and host initiatives with policy makers, business leaders, journalists, advocates and analysts. The programs also produce analysis and reports about their respective issues in the Western hemisphere.

=== Education Program ===
The Education Program researches and advocates to improve the quality of education across Latin America. It focuses on five key initiatives: early childhood development, teacher quality, technology and innovation in education, English language learning, and skills development.

The program hosts various conferences and forums, including a conference with the government of Colombia on drafting a “Regional Agenda on Early Childhood Development” in 2017.

=== Migration, Remittances, and Development Program ===
The Migration, Remittances, and Development Program uses research, policy analysis, project implementation, and technical assistance of migration and transnational economic issues to understand current trends and leverage migration for development.

=== Asia & Latin America Program ===
The Asia & Latin America program examines Asian, especially Chinese, firms’ and governments’ linkages with Latin America. It analyzes, reports, and promotes “responsible and growth-promoting relationships” between the two regions.

=== Peter D. Bell Rule of Law Program ===
The Peter D. Bell Rule of Law Program promotes the rule of law by convening forums and policy debates and providing comprehensive analysis and reports to strengthen governance, inclusive economic growth, and democracy in Latin America.

The namesake of the program, Peter D. Bell, was a founder of the Inter-American Dialogue and the president of CARE USA.

=== Energy, Climate, & Extractive Industries Program ===
The Energy, Climate, & Extractive Industries Program provides analysis and convenes policy makers, corporate leaders, and experts to frame policy debates on investment and sustainable development of natural resources.

The program hosts an energy and resources committee of corporations and regional organizations to discuss key issues in the energy sphere. Analysis and reports on issues like deforestation in the Amazon rainforest, environmental regulation, and liquid natural gas in the Americas are also produced by the program.

== Publications ==
The Dialogue publishes a daily news service that reports on major events and trends in the region. Two additional newsletters, the Latin America Energy Advisor and the Latin America Financial Services Advisor, are published weekly and biweekly respectively.

== Funding ==
The Dialogue's funding comes from a diverse group of corporations, governments, foundations and multilateral organizations. In 2018, grants and contributions represented 35% of the Dialogue's revenue, government grants accounted for 26% and the corporate program provided an additional 15% of the think-tank's funding.

Major donors span the globe, from foundations in El Salvador, Ford Foundation, Henry Luce Foundation, Vidanta Foundation and the Van Leer Foundation. Several governments, such as Switzerland, South Korea, and the United States, provide funding through their foreign affairs ministries. Major private sector donors from around the world, including the BMW Corporation, Pearson, and Ladrillera Santafé financially support the Dialogue, as do many individual donors from the United States and Latin America. The Dialogue's mission is also supported by multilateral organizations that work in the region, like the CAF-Development Bank of Latin America and the Caribbean, the Inter-American Development Bank, and the Organization of American States.

== Members ==
The Dialogue has 124 members from Latin America, the United States, Canada, the Caribbean, and Spain. 20 of its members served as presidents of their countries, three dozen served at the cabinet level, 17 served in national legislatures, 25 are leaders in business or finance sectors, and seven are associated with the media.

== Board of directors ==
Inter-American Dialogue is currently chaired by former President of Costa Rica Laura Chinchilla and former U.S. Department of State Thomas A. Shannon Jr. Its vice-chairs are Mack McLarty, former White House Chief of Staff, and L. Enrique Garcia, president of CAF – Development Bank of Latin America and the Caribbean.

Other members of the Board of Directors:

- Fernando Henrique Cardoso (Brazil)
- David de Ferranti (US)
- Carla Anderson Hills (US)
- Donna J. Hrinak (US)
- Enrique V. Iglesias (Uruguay)
- Earl Jarrett (Jamaica)
- Ricardo Lagos (Chile)
- Susana Malcorra (Argentina)
- Maria Fernanda Teixeira (Brazil)
- Roberto Teixeira da Costa (Brazil)
- Arturo Sarukhán (Mexico)
- Maria Priscila Vansetti (Brazil)
- Ernesto Zedillo (Mexico)
