= Canning House =

British non-governmental organisation

- The Hispanic and Luso-Brazilian Council
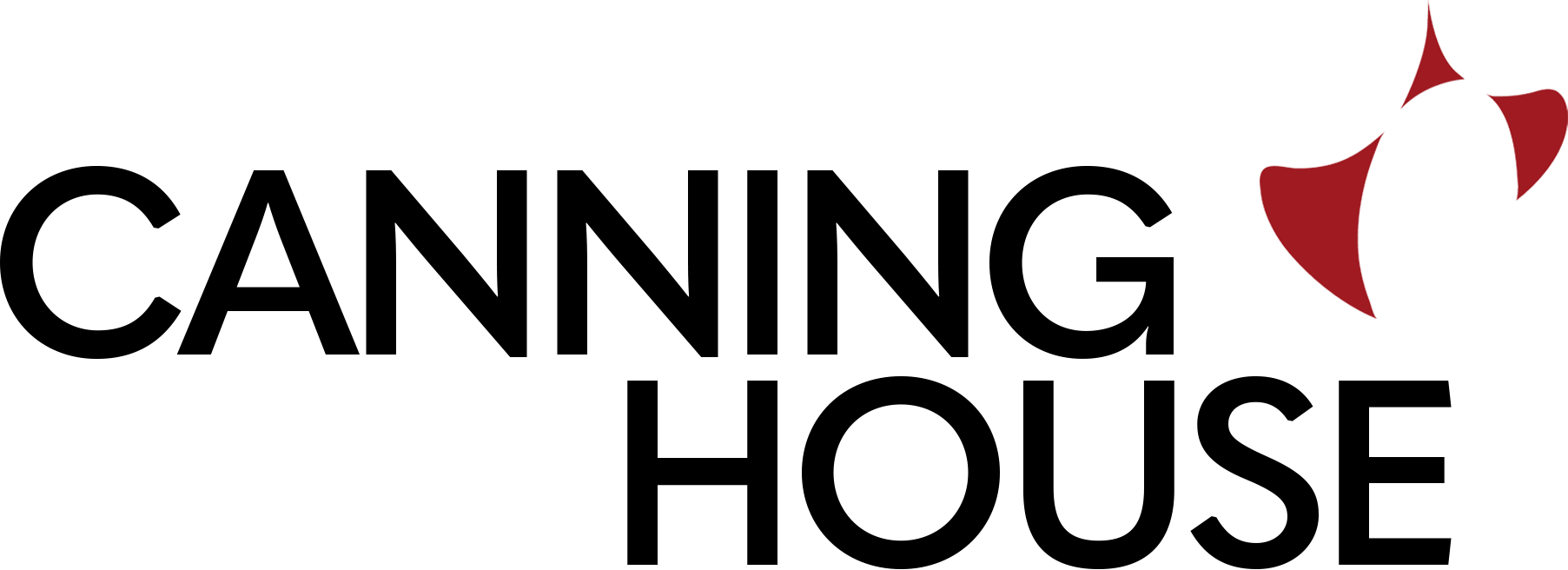
- Established: 1943; 83 years ago
- Headquarters: 50 Broadway, London, United Kingdom
- CEO: Jeremy Browne
- Website: www.canninghouse.org

Canning House is a British not-for profit and non-governmental organisation dedicated to the discussion of social, political and economic affairs across the region of Latin America and Iberia through research and debate. Founded in 1943, Canning House serves as a forum for debate and discussion of the current affairs of the region.

== History ==
Canning House is named after George Canning (1770–1827), British Foreign Secretary between 1807–1809 and 1822–1827, and briefly Prime Minister in 1827. Canning was a prominent advocate of the emerging republics in early Latin America, and is a recognized figure in the region with several streets bearing his name. Canning House first came into being in 1943 with the creation of the Hispanic Council and the Luso-Brazilian Council simultaneously. Following the end of the Second World War, both councils were merged, and the resulting entity was commonly referred to as Canning House. In 1973 the Hispanic and Luso-Brazilian Council was registered as a limited company, and in 1997 Canning House was set up as a wholly owned subsidiary. Initial meetings took place at the Shell-Mex House before offices were set up in Berkeley Street in 1947. From 1953 until 2018, Canning House was based in Belgrave Square before moving to 126 Wigmore Street. Canning House moved to its current headquarters in 50 Broadway, London, in 2023. In July 2022, Jeremy Browne, a former British Minister of State for Latin America, among other regions, became Canning House's Chief Executive.

== Activities and Events ==
Canning House regularly convenes events on the UK-Latin American relationship. It hosts a series of conferences each year on mining, infrastructure, finance and technology. These events are aimed at encouraging trade and investment links between the UK and Latin America, and Iberia.

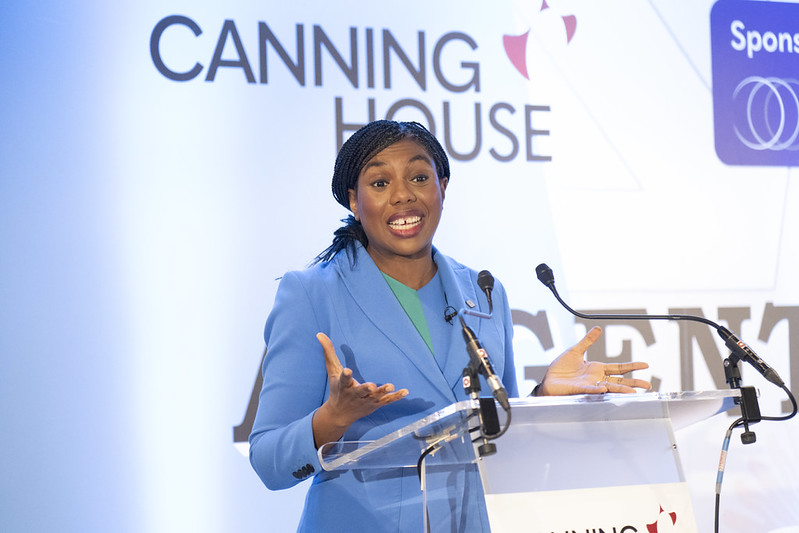
The Rt Hon Kemi Badenoch MP giving a speech at the Canning House Argentina-UK Summit, 2025.

Each year, Canning House hosts two "LatAm-UK Summits" which focus on either Mexico, Brazil, or Argentina. The 2025 edition of the Argentina-UK Summit included a speech by the Leader of the Opposition of the United Kingdom, the Rt Hon Kemi Badenoch MP. Previous editions of the Brazil-UK Summit were known as the UK-Brazil Conversa.

At their offices in London Canning House convenes roundtables with prominent political figures from the region and business actors from the UK and Latin America. Roundtable guests have included former Ecuadorian President Guillermo Lasso, and the Parliamentary Under-Secretary of State for Latin America, Chris Elmore MP.

Canning House has served as secretariat for the All-Party Parliamentary Group (APPG) meetings on Latin America since 2015, and has contributed to parliamentary papers examining the UK's relationship with Latin American nations.

=== The Canning Lecture ===
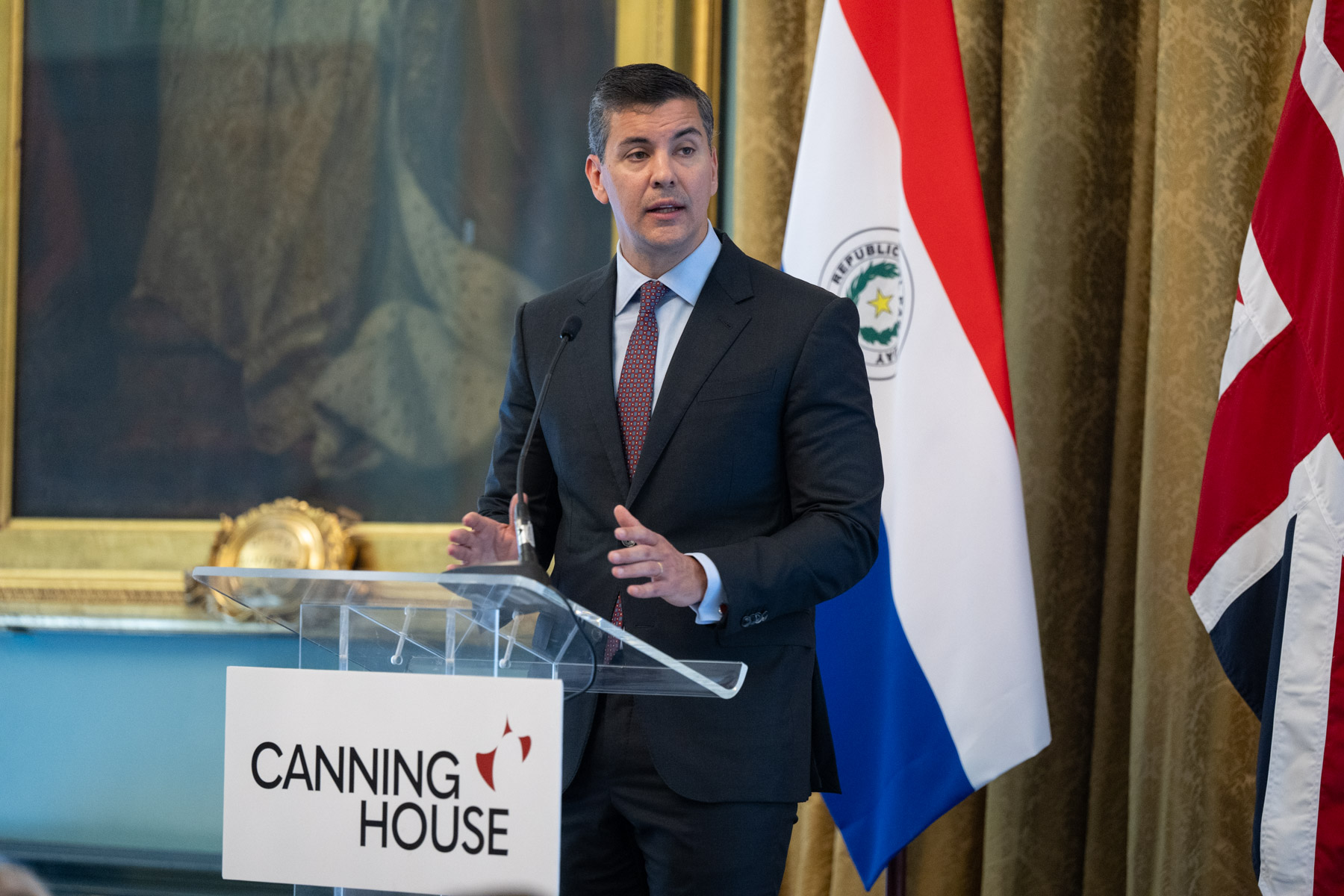
President Santiago Peña delivering the Canning Lecture in 2025.

The Canning Lecture is a speech delivered by visiting heads of state or government in which they reflect upon bilateral relations with the UK and provide a picture for their plans in office.The first Canning Lecture was given by Fernando Henrique Cardoso, President of Brazil. Other speakers include President of Chile Michelle Bachelet, the President of Colombia Ivan Duque, and President of Ecuador, Daniel Noboa.

In 2010, then-Foreign Secretary William Hague became the first British Foreign Secretary to give the Canning Lecture, renamed in that year as the Canning Agenda. In it, he set out the government's foreign policy agenda with a renewed focus on Latin America, outlining a desire to increase trade and encourage British businesses to explore the region in the context of an increasingly globalized world economy. As of 2026, the most recent Canning Lecture was delivered by Santiago Peña, President of Paraguay.

List of Canning Lectures
| Year | Name | Country |
|---|---|---|
| 1997 | President Fernando Henrique Cardoso | Brazil |
| 1998 | President Ernesto Zedillo | Mexico |
| 1998 | President Alberto Fujimori | Peru |
| 1998 | President Carlos Menem | Argentina |
| 2000 | President Andrés Pastrana | Colombia |
| 2001 | President Hugo Chávez | Venezuela |
| 2002 | President Vicente Fox | Mexico |
| 2002 | President Alejandro Toledo | Peru |
| 2003 | President Ricardo Lagos | Chile |
| 2006 | President Leonel Fernández | Dominican Republic |
| 2006 | President Hugo Chávez | Venezuela |
| 2008 | President Michelle Bachelet | Chile |
| 2009 | President Rafael Correa | Ecuador |
| 2010 | The Rt Hon William Hague MP | United Kingdom |
| 2011 | President Juan Manuel Santos | Colombia |
| 2012 | President Sebastián Piñera | Chile |
| 2013 | Prime Minister Pedro Passos Coelho | Portugal |
| 2015 | President Enrique Peña Nieto | Mexico |
| 2016 | President Michelle Bachelet | Chile |
| 2019 | President Iván Duque Márquez | Colombia |
| 2021 | President Laurentino Cortizo | Panama |
| 2021 | President Carlos Alvarado Quesada | Costa Rica |
| 2021 | President Guillermo Lasso | Ecuador |
| 2022 | President Luis Lacalle Pou | Uruguay |
| 2025 | President Daniel Noboa Azín | Ecuador |
| 2025 | President Santiago Peña | Paraguay |

=== The Canning Medal ===
In 2013 Canning House introduced The Canning Medal to both mark their 70th anniversary, and to recognise distinguished individuals who have contributed to the strengthening of UK-Latin American relations.

List of Canning Medal Recipients
| Year | Recipient |
|---|---|
| 2013 | Viscount Montgomery of Alamein CMG CBE |
| 2016 | Dr Enrique García Rodríguez |
| 2018 | H.E. Ambassador Iván Romero Martínez |
| 2018 | Lord Garel-Jones |
| 2022 | Baroness Hooper CMG |
| 2026 | Lord Brennan KC |

== Publications ==
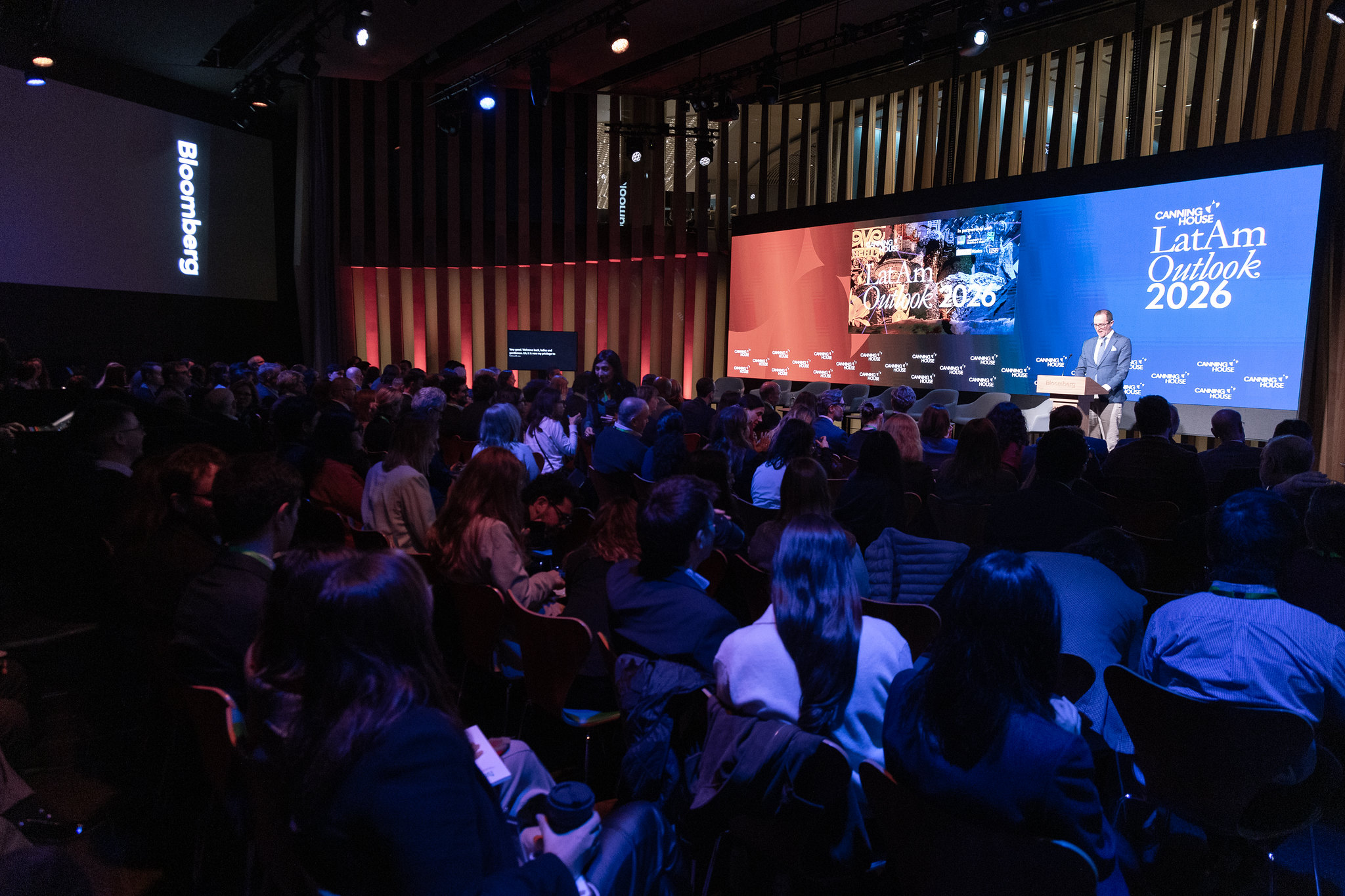
The launch of the Canning House LatAm Outlook 2026 at Bloomberg's London office.

Canning House publishes research and commentary on Latin America from external authors. The Canning House Blog features short form publications on issues in the region. Canning Papers are long form analytical pieces that address broad topics in the region. Previous Canning Papers have included 2025 - Brazil's big opportunity? and What does the US election mean for Latin America?

Since 2020, Canning House has authored an annual report titled LatAm Outlook. The report examines uses the six largest economies of the region (Argentina, Brazil, Chile, Colombia, Mexico and Peru) as case studies to explore the Global, Political, Economic, Commercial, Social, and Environmental Outook in the region over the next five years. Each chapter is written by a different expert in the field, in partnership with external organisations. Previous editions have included contributions from the Department for Business and Trade, Ipsos, the Stockholm Environment Institute, The International Institute for Strategic Studies, and Bloomberg. The report is launched each year at a public event in which the authors present their chapters and predictions for the next five years in Latin America.

=== The Library ===
The Canning House Library was created in 1948, covering a broad range of subject areas concerning Latin America and Iberia. The collection contains over 54,000 works and now resides in the Maughan Library at King's College London having been gifted to the university in 2012. It was originally housed inside Canning House. Members of Canning House are entitled to reference use of the library.

== Structure ==
Canning House operates a membership system that includes both Individual and Corporate membership offerings. Principal benefits for Corporate members of Canning House include access to networking opportunities, priority entry to Canning House events, and sponsorship or partnership opportunities. Individual members are given access to Canning House newsletters, events, and the Canning House Library Collection.
