= Spain–United Kingdom relations =

- Spain: United Kingdom

Diplomatic mission
- Spanish Embassy, London: British Embassy, Madrid

Envoy
- Ambassador Carlos Bastarreche: Ambassador Alex Ellis

Spain and the United Kingdom maintain bilateral international relations. Both countries are members of the Council of Europe and NATO. Spain is a European Union member and the United Kingdom is a former European Union member.

== History ==
The history of Spanish–British relations is complicated by the political and religious heritages of the two countries. Neither the United Kingdom nor Spain have a unique constitutional ancestor; Britain was originally created by a union of the kingdoms of England and Scotland (and later joined by Ireland), whilst the Kingdom of Spain was initially created by a union of the crowns of Castile and Aragon (and later joined by Navarre). They have also been complicated by the fact that the United Kingdom and Spain were both imperial powers, often after the same land, an occurrence which is being played out to this day with the disputed ownership and status of Gibraltar.

Spanish Empire

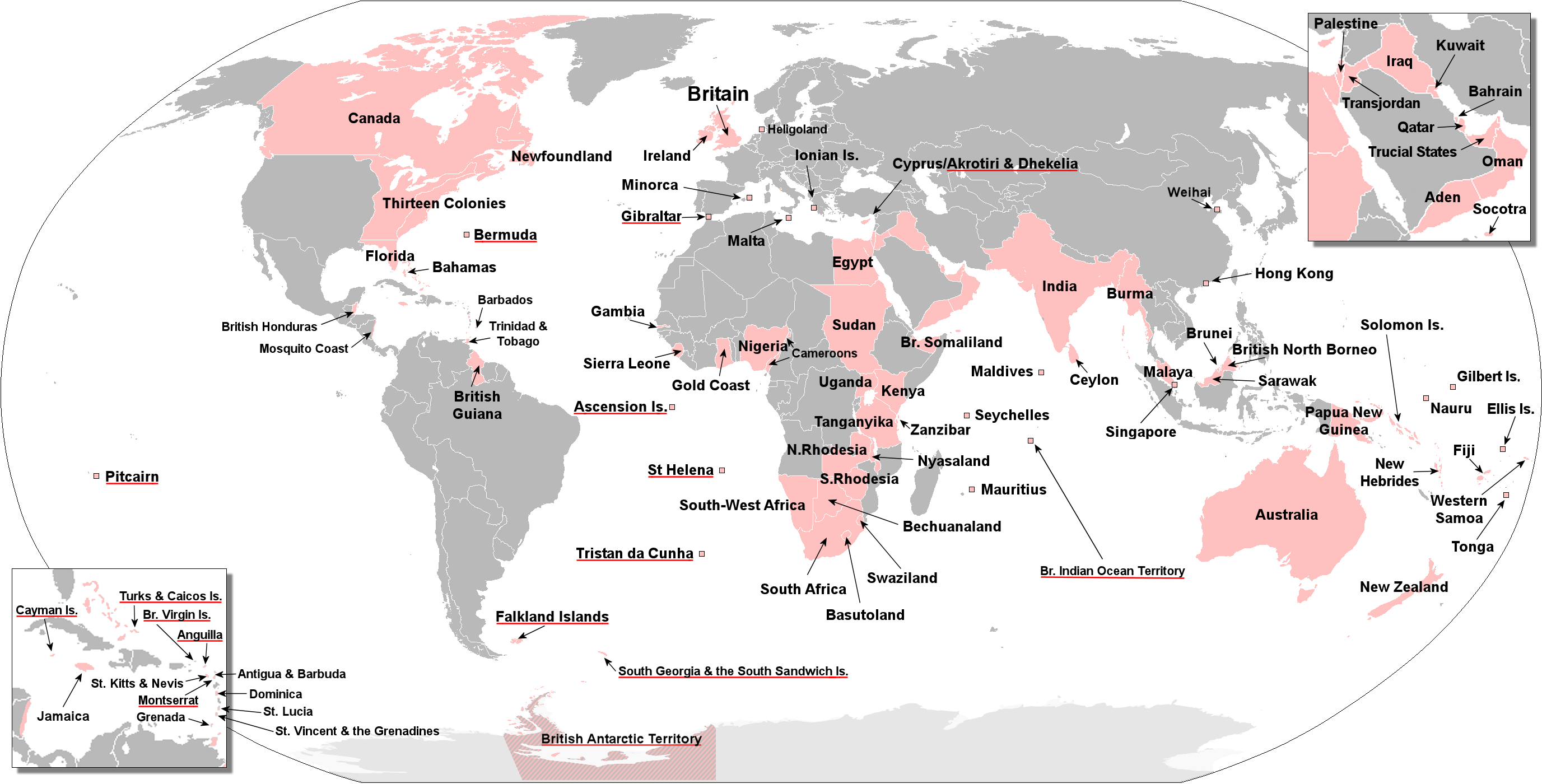
British Empire

=== Anglo-Portuguese Alliance ===
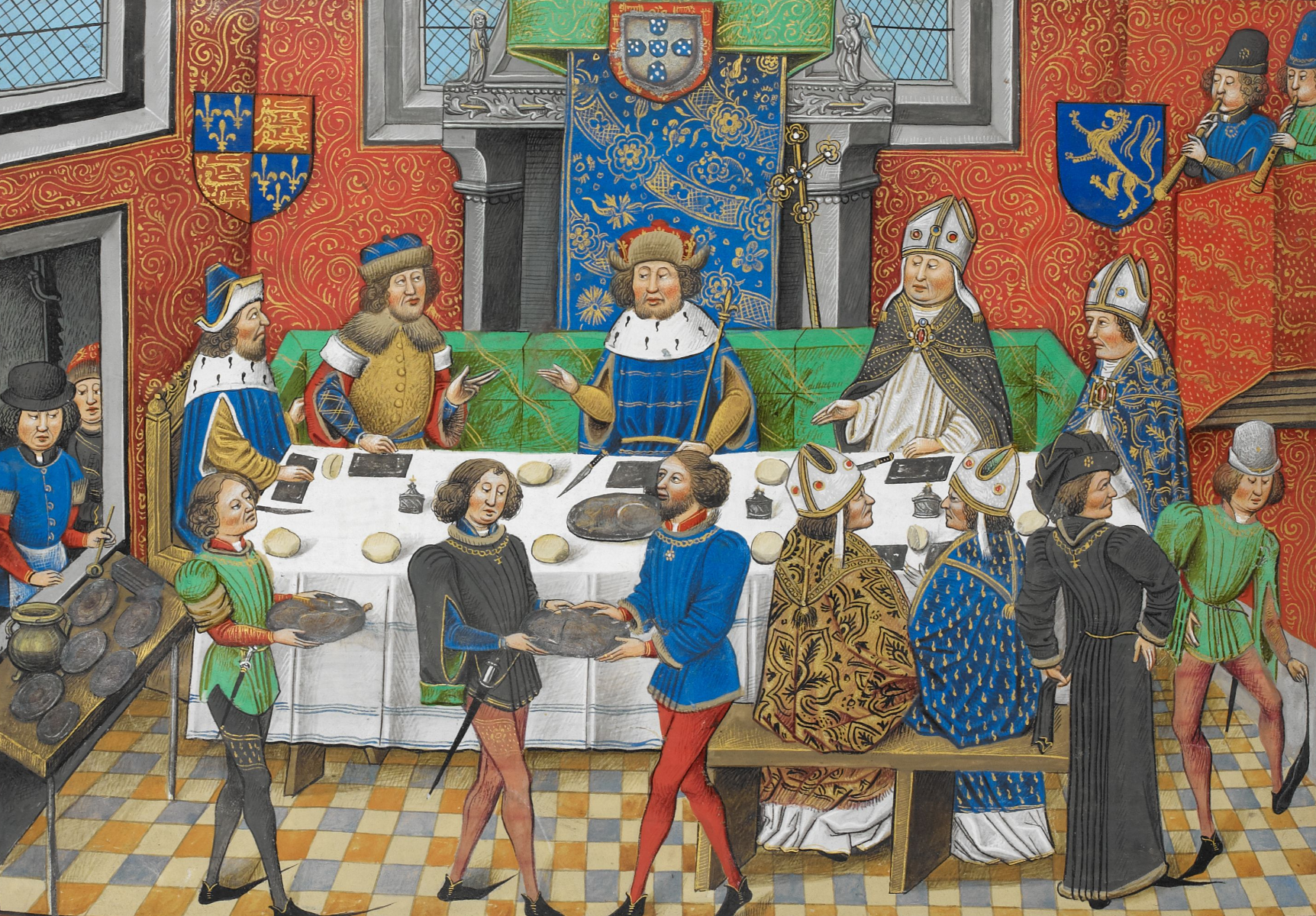
João I of Portugal entertaining John of Gaunt in the early years of the Anglo-Portuguese Alliance.

For centuries, the role of England, and subsequently Britain, in Iberia was coloured by the Anglo-Portuguese Alliance. Relations with Portugal have always been closer than those with Spain, and Spain and Britain have gone to war twice over Portugal's independence, first in the Portuguese Interregnum and second in the Portuguese War of Restoration.

In 1384, at the height of the Hundred Years' War, England provided reinforcements to King João I to thwart a French-backed Castilian invasion. These forces saw action at the decisive battle of Aljubarrota, and proved to be vital in securing the continued independence of Portugal from its larger neighbours.

The alliance submerged into crisis when Portugal supported Joan of Castile instead of her aunt Isabella I of Castile during the War of the Castilian Succession of 1474–1479, because France also supported Joan's candidature. In the following years, the English collaborated with the Catholic Monarchs - Rodrigo González de la Puebla was sent to London as their first semi-permanent ambassador, their daughter Catharine of Aragon married Henry VII's sons Arthur and Henry and a small group of English soldiers even fought on the Castilian side during the conquest of Granada. However, the struggle of Elizabeth I of England against Philip II of Spain in the sixteenth century led to renewed English support of the Portuguese independence movement that started in 1640 with the crowning of King João IV of Portugal. England's support for Portugal during their Restoration War further soured Anglo-Spanish relations. England nevertheless meditated the Treaty of Lisbon of 1668 between Portugal and Spain, which saw the independence of the former and the recognition of Pedro II as King.

Arms of Mary I and Philip of Spain as English monarchs.

In following centuries, Portugal and Britain were closely allied in their politics and wars against Spain, which closely collaborated with France after the Spanish War of Succession (1700–1714) that established the House of Bourbon on the Spanish throne. The alliance was renewed in the face of Spain supporting France as an ally and the renewal of their Bourbon compact in the Seven Years' War. In this war Spain agreed to attack Portugal and thus invaded in 1762 with a large army. British troops numbering near 10,000 came to aid the Portuguese. In spite of three attempts the Spanish along with their French ally were heavily defeated losing in total upwards of 25,000 men.

No further action between the powers took place until 1797 with the French Revolutionary Wars. Once again Spain and France were allied against Portugal and Britain. The Napoleonic Wars however saw Spain and Portugal along with Britain being allies in their fight against Napoleon after he tried occupying Spain in the Peninsular War.

=== Age of Exploration ===
During the 16th century (1500–1599) there were complex political, commercial, and cultural connections that linked the large powerful Spanish Empire under the Habsburgs with a small but ambitious England. The Habsburgs sought allies against France. Both countries were constantly in turmoil or allied in a love-hate relationship. The marriage of the Catholic sovereigns –Philip II and Mary Tudor– in 1554 was the high point in a century of negotiations, wars and treaties. Philip and Mary got along personally, but there were no children and their retainers displayed mistrust and the marriage lacked in ceremonies and entertainments. The death of Queen Mary brought the Protestant Queen Elizabeth to the throne, and the two friendly nations became hostile enemies.

Henry VIII of England, who had made a political match with Catherine of Aragon (a marriage that was later annulled by Henry), made a series of short-lived alliances with Carlos I against France during the Italian War of 1521 and the Italian War of 1542. Philip II of Spain married Mary I of England, making Philip king of Spain and of England and Ireland. Mary's early death without issue prevented a closer personal union of the countries.

==== Gold and diplomacy ====
The "Treasure Crisis" of 1568 was Elizabeth's seizure of gold from Spanish ships in English ports in November 1568. Chased by privateers in the English channel, five small Spanish ships carrying gold and silver worth 400,000 florins (£85,000) sought shelter in English harbours at Plymouth and Southampton. The English government headed by William Cecil gave permission. The money was bound for the Spanish Netherlands as payment for Spanish soldiers who were fighting the rebels there. Queen Elizabeth discovered that the gold was not owned by Spain, but was still owned by Italian bankers. She decided to seize it, and treated as a loan from the Italian bankers to England. The bankers agreed to her terms and she eventually repaid the bankers. Spain reacted furiously, and seized English property in the Netherlands and Spain. England reacted by seizing Spanish ships and properties in England. Spain reacted by imposing an embargo preventing all English imports into the Netherlands. The bitter diplomatic standoff lasted for four years. However neither side wanted war, so in 1573 at the Convention of Nymegen England promised to end support for raids on Spanish shipping by English privateers such as Francis Drake and John Hawkins. It was finalised in the Convention of Bristol in August 1574 in which both sides paid for what they had seized. Trade resumed between England and Spain and relations improved.

==== War and Armadas ====
In 1585, relations between England and Spain worsened after Mary, Queen of Scots was beheaded whom the latter had supported. King Philip II of Spain ordered an invasion of England and set about building what would become the Spanish Armada at the naval shipyards of Cádiz. Elizabeth once again authorized Francis Drake to disrupt Spanish shipping - he sacked Santo Domingo and Cartagena, which became the opening salvo of the Anglo-Spanish War (1585–1604). Further disruption then took place at Cadiz in 1587; Drake singed the King of Spain’s beard and over 100 Spanish ships were destroyed, delaying the launch of the Armada by a year. The English also captured 2,900 butts of Sherry (vino de Jerez) which later fuelled the popularisation of the drink in England.

After almost two years of preparation, the Spanish Armada was ready to sail. Its 154 ships carried 19,000 soldiers (17,000 Spanish, 2,000 Portuguese) and 8,000 sailors, as well as 180 clerics who were to help reestablish Catholicism in England. The plan was for the Spanish Armada to sail up the English Channel in a crescent formation to clear a path for the entry of army troops stationed in the Netherlands. The first attempt to sail in May 1588 ended when the Spanish Armada ran into storms and the fleet lost five ships.

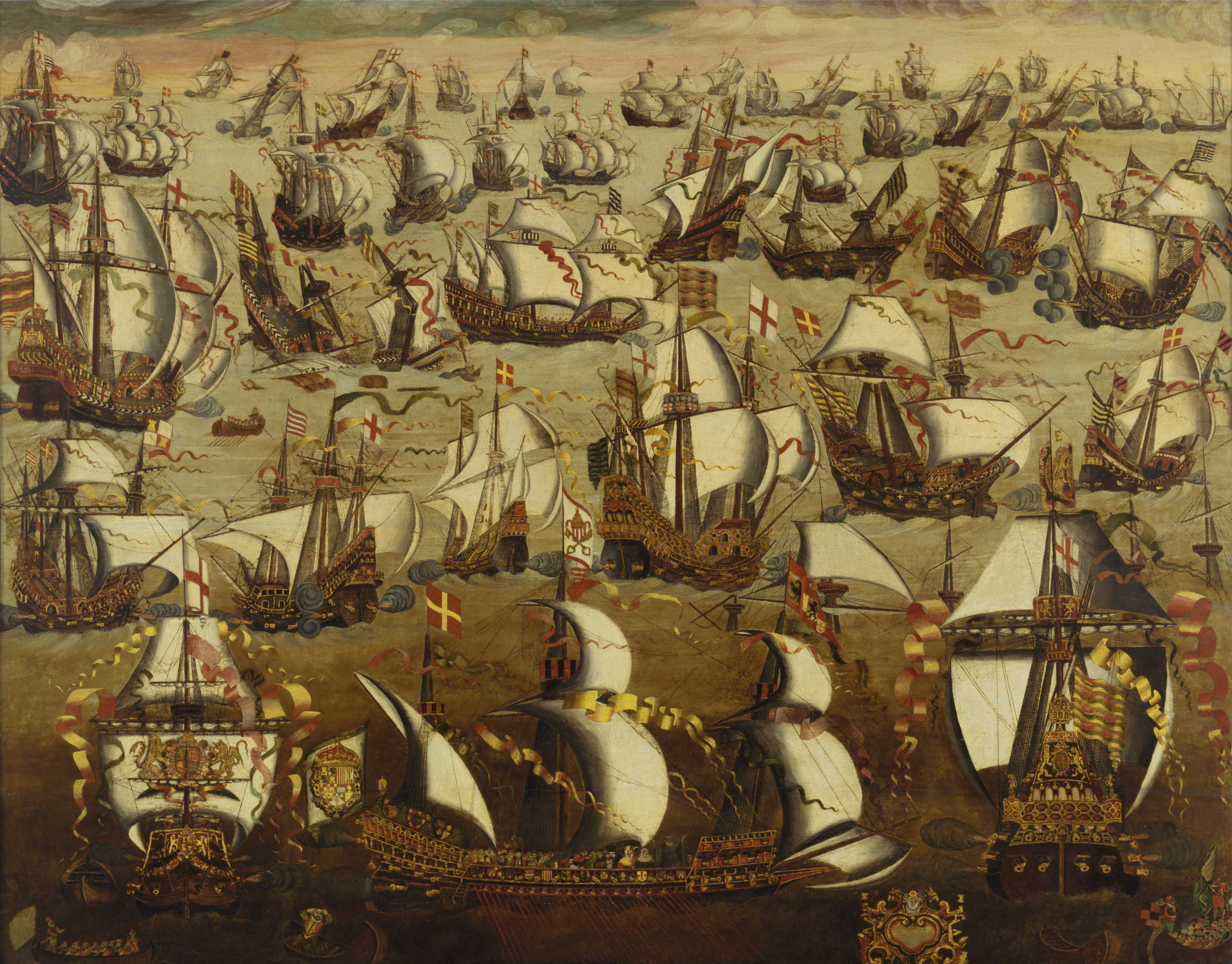
The Spanish Armada and English ships in August 1588 (unknown, 16th-century).

Storms forced the fleet to stay put at A Coruña until July. Finally, they reached Lizard Point on 19 July. The English fleet was at Plymouth and followed the Armada up the Channel. The first encounter was off Plymouth, 21 July, the second off Portland Bill, 23 July, the third off the Isle of Wight, 24 July. The Armada was not seriously damaged and its formation remained intact. On 27 July, the Armada had reached the Strait of Dover and anchored off Calais. The next day, the English set several of their ships on fire and sent them out to the English Channel, hoping they would destroy the ships of the Spanish fleet. The ships of the Armada cut their cables thus losing their anchors and scattered throughout the Channel breaking the crescent formation the fleet needed to maintain until troops arrived from the Netherlands. The English attacked the vulnerable Spanish ships at this conflict, known as the Battle of Gravelines on 29 July. Lord Howard of Effingham's English warships fired at will, sinking one ship. Philip II's invasion was foiled, and the Armada was forced to push on into the North Sea. The voyage home proved costly, stormy waters claiming some 60 ships and thousands of lives.

England sent out its own armada the following year, in the hope that the Portuguese would rise up against the Spanish crown and to inflict further losses on the anchored Spanish fleet. The venture however failed and endured heavy losses.

A new front opened in the war between Spain and England, the coast of northern France. In 1590, the Spanish occupied Brittany from where they had a base to attack Cornwall. French and English forces captured Fort Crozon which secured the major port of Brest. Nevertheless, the Spanish mounted one such raid in 1595; Mousehole, Newlyn and Penzance were sacked and burned. This event marked the last time England was ever invaded by hostile forces. The following year the English launched a major raid against Cadiz. The attack saw the city's capture, sacking and a two-week occupation. The economic losses caused by this were numerous: the city was burned and the raid contributed to Spain's declaration of bankruptcy the following year.

In retaliation the Spanish attempted an invasion of the British isles; the Second Spanish Armada set sail in October 1596 but this hit a storm off Cape Finesterre and sailed back to port heavily ravaged. A year later the English led by the Earl of Essex a year later set out the Azores to intercept a Spanish treasure fleet but encountered very little. At the same time another Spanish attempt took place hoping to intercept the returning English fleet as well as invade the West of the British isles but this failed due to storms and bad luck.

The final Spanish armada took place in 1601 and although depleted from storms, managed to make landfall in Southern Ireland. Their aim was to assist the Irish rebel earls led by Hugh O'Neill in the rebelling against the English Crown. The English however besieged the 4,000 Spaniards at Kinsale. Cut off by the English Navy the Spanish surrendered the following year which ended further operations.

Peace between England and Spain was finally signed in 1604 when King James I, son of Mary, Queen of Scots, succeeded the childless Elizabeth to the throne. Both England and Spain ran into serious debt as a result of the war. Spain would declare bankruptcy again five years after the peace but would be able to consolidate and strengthen its Empire in the New World. The English too would prosper - they began to colonise North America, and the East India Company which had been formed later in the war soon began to breach the Spanish and Portuguese trade monopoly.

=== Seventeenth century ===
In April 1655, an English expeditionary force unsuccessfully attacked Santo Domingo. The expeditionary force nevertheless was able to mount a successful invasion of Jamaica the following month. The Spanish tried twice to recapture the island but both times (1657 and 1658) they were defeated. The island was transformed into an English colony but was still a threat from the Spanish.

In 1657, England formed an alliance with France, merging the Anglo–Spanish war with the larger Franco-Spanish War which saw the conquest of Dunkirk. Although the Anglo-Spanish war was terminated after the Restoration of King Charles II in 1660, no treaty had been signed. England then gave full support to the Portuguese in 1662 who were fighting for their independence. In addition tensions in the Caribbean centred on England's hold of Jamaica - privateers, notably Henry Morgan led devastating raids on the Spanish Main, including the notorious raid on Panama which took place after peace had been made.

The conflict officially ended with two peace treaties which were signed at Madrid in 1667 and 1670 both of which were favourable to England - for one the Spanish finally ceded Jamaica.

=== War of the Spanish Succession ===
The War of the Spanish Succession (1701–14) saw the invasion of Spain by the Holy Roman Empire (mainly Austria and Prussia, as well as other minor German states), Great Britain, the Dutch Republic, the Duchy of Savoy and Portugal in an attempt to force the Habsburg candidate onto the Spanish throne instead of the Duc of Anjou, a member of the House of Bourbon. The later had been left as successor to the crown in the testament of Charles II, who had died without issue. As aftermath of this war, that featured both an international dimension and a domestic civil conflict, the Bourbons held the Crown while Spain lost Menorca and Gibraltar to the British.

=== Eighteenth-century imperial warfare ===
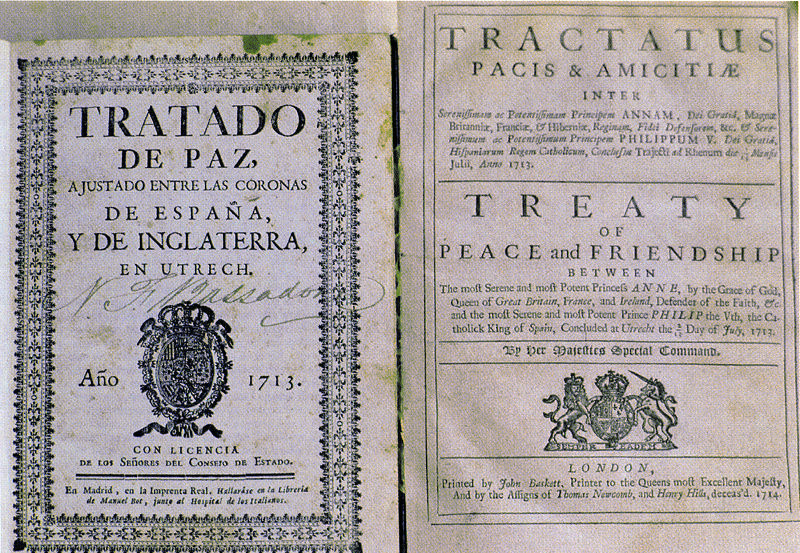
A Spanish and an English edition of the Treaty of Utrecht

The Treaty of Utrecht that ended the War of Spanish succession was followed within two years by the death of the French King Louis XIV. This fundamentally changed the European system. Louis XV was in his minority when he ascended to the French throne, and in response, Philip V attempted to make Spain the dominant continental power. This began with the War of the Quadruple Alliance (1718–1720), in which Great Britain and France were allies against Spain when Spain attempted to reclaim territories in Italy.

Where continental Europe had been the focus of the conflict between Great Britain and France during the War of Spanish Succession, conflicts between Great Britain and Spain were largely focused in the Caribbean, and in North America. The British had been relatively late to settle on the continent, but had built up a number of successful colonies with rapidly expanding populations. They began to challenge the Spanish monopoly on trade in South America, which the Spanish tried to prevent by passing laws against non-Spanish traders. These longstanding policies had proved a source of conflict in the mid 17th century, and again became a source of conflict after the Treaty of Utrecht included an Asiento which allowed the South Sea Company to trade with Spain's South American colonies. In the Anglo-Spanish War (1727–1729), the Royal Navy launched unsuccessful operations against Blockade of Porto Bello. Spain in turn attempted to retake Gibraltar hoping that the Holy Roman Empire would join in their side. However the siege was a costly failure and British diplomacy enabled Austrian non aggression. With Austria out Spain was forced to sign the treaty of Seville.

Spain and Britain for the next 15 years were at peace with Britain even supporting Spain during the War of the Polish Succession. Nevertheless, there were still tensions between the two countries. Things came to a head when news of a Welsh trader, Captain Robert Jenkins, had his ear cut off as a punishment in 1731 which later caused outrage in Britain when he testified at a hearing in the house of commons seven years later. This ultimately among other things led to the War of Jenkins' Ear, an element of the wider War of the Austrian Succession.

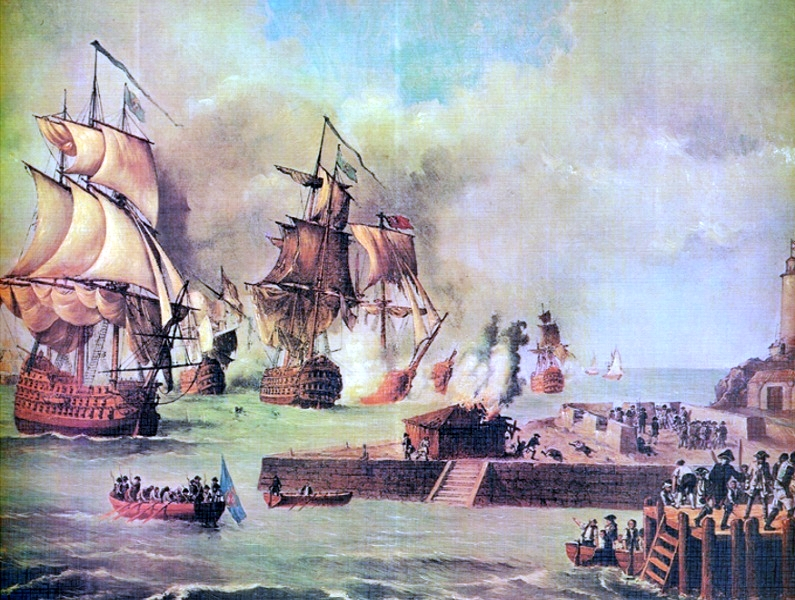
The battle of Cartagena de Indias in 1741

The British started the war by capturing and sacking Porto Bello, a major Spanish trading and naval base. The British triumph was hailed throughout its empire, and a number of streets are still named Portobello. However, in the spring of 1741 a British expeditionary force attempted to capture Cartagena de Indias, which failed after the force suffered heavy casualties from yellow fever. All the while, Spanish vessels menaced commercial shipping at the mouth of the Cape Fear River, seizing several ships as they entered or cleared the river. These Spanish vessels were largely manned by Black sailors. For eight years, these privateers infested North Carolina's waters, captured merchant vessels, ravaged the coast, plundered towns, and levied tribute on the inhabitants almost at will. In the summer of 1742, the Spanish invasion of Georgia created such fear throughout the colony that many people fled to South Carolina or elsewhere. The military activity on St. Simons Island culminated with the Battle of Bloody Marsh and the withdrawal of the Spanish.

==== Seven Years' War ====
The Seven Years' War lasted between 1756 and 1763, arraying Prussia, Great Britain and Hanover (with the British king as its prince-elector) against Austria, France, Russia, Sweden, and most smaller German states. Spain was drawn into the conflict later in 1761, on the side of France. In this Spain agreed to attack Britain's ally Portugal and thus invaded in 1762 which ended in disaster. Worse was to follow - the capitals of the Spanish East & West Indies - Manila and Havana respectively were seized by the British. After the treaty of Paris in 1763 both Havana and Manila were returned in exchange for Spain ceding Florida to Great Britain.

==== American Revolutionary War ====
Hoping to gain revenge on the British for their defeat during the Seven Years' War, France offered support to rebel American colonists seeking independence from Britain during the American War of Independence and in 1778 entered the war on their side. They then urged Spain to do the same, hoping the combined force would be strong enough to overcome the Royal Navy and be able to invade England. In 1779 Spain joined the war, hoping to take advantage of a substantially weakened Britain.

A well-organised force under Bernardo de Galvez operating out of Spanish Louisiana launched a number of attacks in British colonies in the Caribbean and the Gulf of Mexico, which they took with relative ease against weak British garrisons, and were planning an expedition against Jamaica when peace was declared in 1783.

In Europe, Britain's traditional allies Austria and Portugal remained neutral, leaving them isolated. Because of this there was virtually no military activity in continental Europe aside from the Great Siege of Gibraltar. Despite a prolonged besiegement, the British garrison there was able to hold out until relieved and The Rock remained in British hands following the Treaty of Paris.

Unlike their French allies (for whom the war proved largely to be a disaster, financially and militarily) the Spanish made a number of territorial gains, recovering Florida and Menorca. Despite this there were ominous signs for the Spanish, as the combined French and Spanish fleets had been unable to gain mastery of the seas and had also failed in two of their key objectives, regaining Gibraltar and an invasion of Great Britain.

=== Nootka crisis with Britain, 1789–1795 ===
The Nootka Crisis was a crisis with Britain starting in 1789 at Nootka Sound, an unsettled area at the time that is now part of British Columbia, Canada. Spain seized small British commercial ships engaged in the fur trade on an area on the Pacific Coast. Spain claimed ownership based on a papal decree of 1493 that Spain said gave it control of the entire Pacific Ocean. Britain rejected the Spanish claims and used its greatly superior naval power to threaten war and win the dispute. Spain, a rapidly fading military power, was unable to depend upon its longtime ally France, which was torn by internal revolution. The dispute was settled by negotiations in 1792–94 known as the Nootka Convention which became friendly when Spain switched sides in 1792 and became an ally of Britain against France. Spain surrendered to Britain many of its trade and territorial claims in the Pacific, ending a two-hundred-year monopoly on Asian-Pacific trade. The outcome was a victory for mercantile interests of Britain and opened the way to British expansion in the Pacific, whilst in turn it was an international humiliation for Spain.

=== French Revolutionary and Napoleonic Wars ===
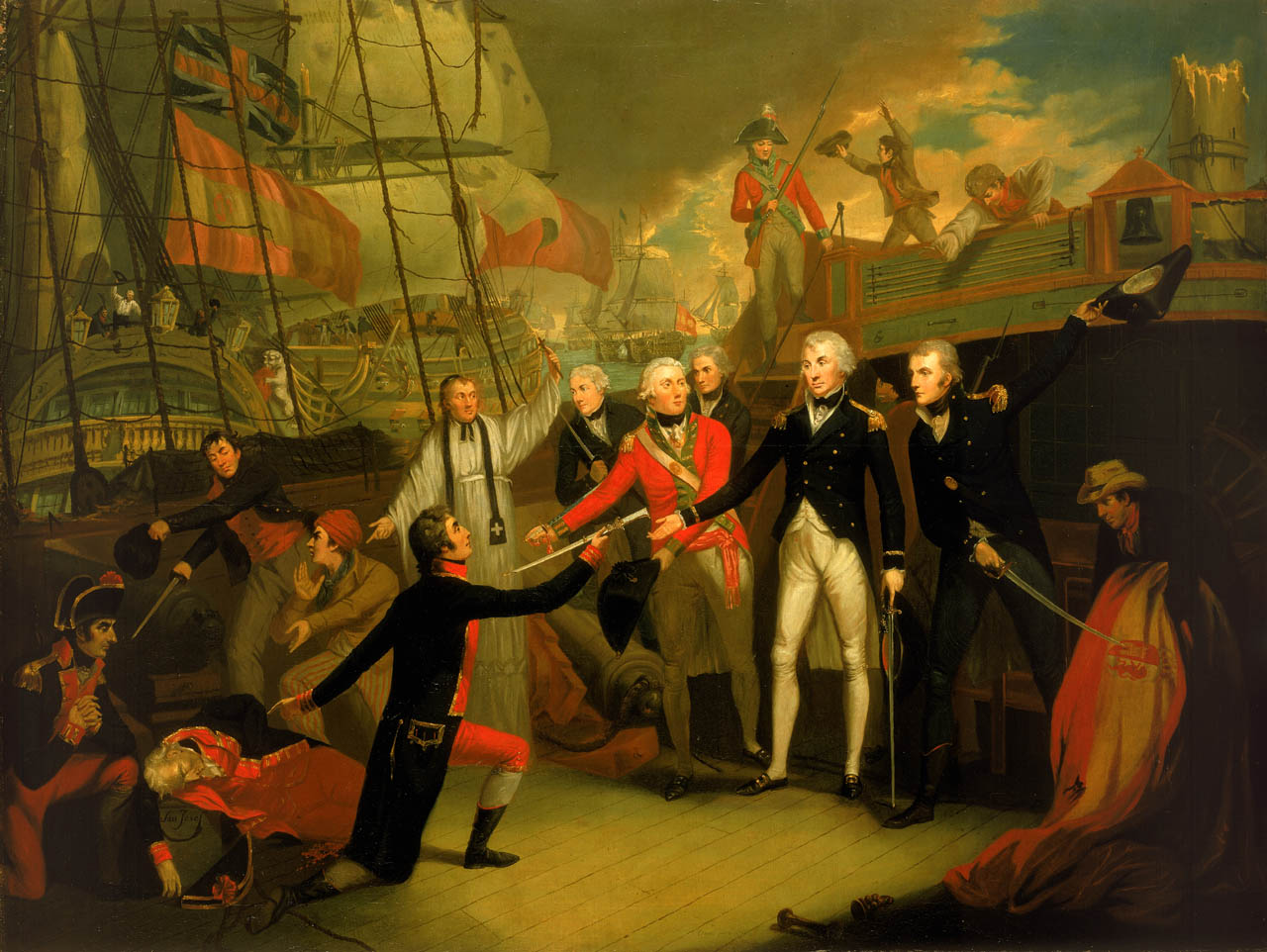
The 1797 Battle of Cape St. Vincent

The aftermath of the 1789 French Revolution unusually saw Britain and Spain as allies for the first time in well over a century. After King Louis XVI of France was executed in 1793 Britain joined Spain in a growing coalition of European states trying to invade France and defeat the revolution. The coalition suffered a number of defeats at the hands of the French and soon broke up. Spain, influenced by the pro-French Manuel de Godoy, made peace in 1795 while Britain continued to fight on. In 1796 Spain signed the Treaty of San Ildefonso and aligned with the French against the British.

At the start of the Napoleonic Wars, Spain again found itself allied with France, and the Spanish Navy suffered several defeats at British hands, notably at the Battle of Trafalgar. During the French Revolutionary and Napoleonic Wars, British forces made several attempts to capture Spanish territories. In 1797, a British expeditionary force under Ralph Abercromby captured Trinidad but then failed to capture Puerto Rico. A British fleet under Horatio Nelson led a failed attack on Santa Cruz de Tenerife in the same year, though in 1798 British forces occupied Menorca. In 1806 and 1807, the British launched two failed invasions of the River Plate in South America.

Napoleon moved into Spain in 1807, hoping that French control of Iberia would facilitate the war with the United Kingdom. He tried to force Portugal to accept the Continental System, and to place his brother Joseph on the Spanish throne. In 1808, the Dos de Mayo Uprising led to war breaking out between the Spanish and French troops occupying Spain, with the former allying with Britain. From 1808 to 1814, a Coalition army consisting of British, Portuguese and Spanish troops under the command of the Duke of Wellington eventually drove the French out of Spain as part of the Peninsular War. Spanish troops joined the British as they launched an invasion of south-west France, which ended in April 1814 after Napoleon abdicated at Fontainebleau on 11 April.

=== Atlantic slave trade ===
In the 19th century, the British Empire was at the height of its power, and the United Kingdom sought to end the Atlantic slave trade, which the United Kingdom and the United States separately had outlawed in 1807.

At the 1817 London Conference, the British pressured the major European colonial powers, including Spain, to agree to abolish the slave trade. Under the agreement, Spain agreed to end the slave trade north of the Equator immediately, and south of the Equator by 1820. British naval vessels were given the right to search suspected slavers. Despite overwhelming British naval supremacy, the trade continued. In 1835, the Anglo-Spanish agreement on the slave trade was renewed, and the rights of British captains to board and search Spanish ships were expanded. Mixed British-Spanish commissions were established at Freetown and Havana. Vessels carrying specified 'equipment articles' (including extra mess gear, lumber, foodstuffs) were declared prima facie to be slavers. However, after the First Carlist War, the leverage afforded by British political support for the Spanish government declined, and the British abolitionist movement focused on the United States and Brazil. Slavery was abolished in Spain's main Caribbean colony, Cuba, in 1888, over fifty years after the practice was outlawed across the British Empire.

=== Carlist Wars ===
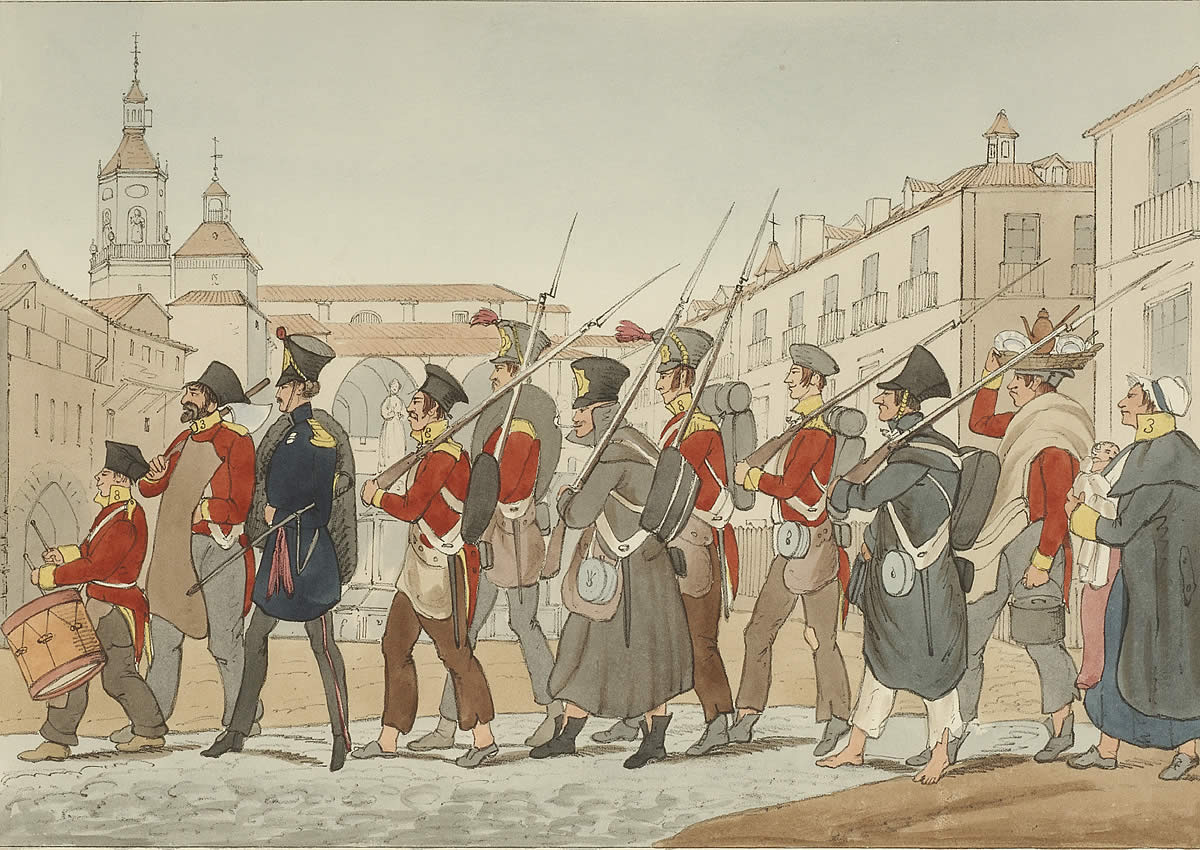
The British Auxiliary Legion at Vitoria in 1837, contemporary lithograph by John West Giles

During the Carlist Wars that raged off and on 1833 to 1876, Spain was wracked by civil war, as a result of a power struggle between the royal heir, Isabella and Carlists, led by the pretender, Don Carlos, her uncle. Fearing a resurgent theocratic Spain, the possible re-emergence of long-silent pretenders to the British throne, a new Spanish monarch that might refuse to accept the independence of Spain's lost Latin American colonies, and domestic secessionism (particularly amongst Irish Catholics), the United Kingdom steadfastly supported Isabella who was a liberal instead of the Carlist pretenders who were reactionaries.

In 1835, the United Kingdom instigated the foundation of the Quadruple Alliance, between the United Kingdom, Spain, France, and Portugal, which supported Queen Isabella's reign. The Duke of Wellington advocated nonintervention, in the expectation that with limited material support from its allies the Spanish government could win the First Carlist War (1833–40). In Spain, British Commissioner Edward Granville Eliot stressed London's desire for peace without British or French involvement. He facilitated a convention to humanise the treatment of prisoners of war. Wellington's policy helped stabilize Portugal and improved British relations with other powers.

During the First Carlist War, the United Kingdom subsidised the Spanish armed forces, just as it had done during the Peninsular War. This was vital to the Spanish war economy, as, since the Napoleonic Wars, the Spanish armed forces had been poorly funded, a legacy of the loss of the majority of Spain's colonial empire. Furthermore, the UK provided a large direct military contribution; the 10,000-strong British Auxiliary Legion, led by George de Lacy Evans, saw action in Navarre and contributed greatly to the suppression of the revolt.

=== 1865-1876 ===
During 1865-1876 the United Kingdom sought to calm the Peninsula. The issues were many: Spain tried to unite with Portugal; there was internal strife in Spain over the throne; and France and Germany argued over the Spanish succession in 1870. Furthermore, there was a "War-in-Sight" crisis of 1875, problems in Morocco, religious intolerance, and the usual issues of trade, which British merchants dominated. London opposed the union of Spain and Portugal because it wanted to keep Portugal as a loyal ally with its strategic location in the Atlantic. The United Kingdom held Gibraltar but it was not yet a fully satisfactory base. The unsuccessful attempts after September 1868 to find a successor to Queen Isabella who would satisfy the French, Germans, Portuguese, Austrians, Italians, and Spanish kept British diplomats busy with peacemaking moves in many capitals. With British help, Spain slowly ceded control of Morocco to France. Spanish anti-Protestant intolerance troubled British merchants and bankers, so Spain softened religious intolerance. For the most part British diplomats were able to defuse tensions and defend British interests in the Peninsula.

== Twentieth century ==
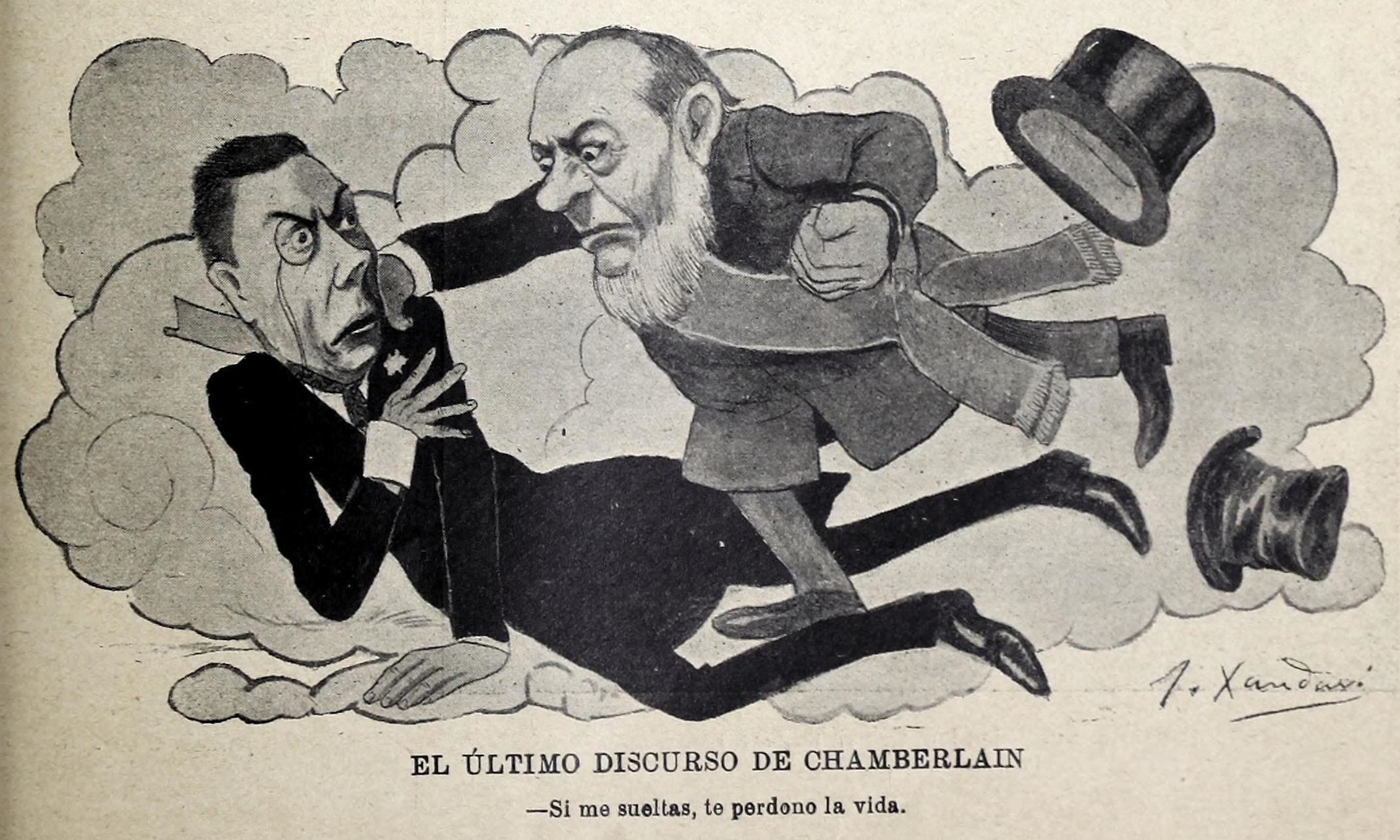
A political cartoon by Spanish cartoonist Joaquín Xaudaró depicting Joseph Chamberlain being punched by Paul Kruger

During the turn of the 19th century, Anglo-Spanish relations were at a low point. The British press included Spain within the group of decaying nations after the Spanish–American War, something which the Prime Minister hinted at in a May 1898 speech. Conversely, the Spanish press expressed support for the Boers in their struggle against the British during the Second Boer War, reflecting the sentiment of much of Europe at the time.

Spain remained neutral in the First World War. It was unprepared to fight and was torn between factions favouring France and those favouring Germany.

=== Spanish Civil War ===
During the Spanish Civil War, 1936–1939, the Conservative government in London was neutral, and took the lead in an arms embargo against both the Republican government and Franco's Nationalists. However Germany, Italy and the USSR defied the embargo and British Communists organised volunteers for the International Brigades that fought on the Republican side. Many Conservative leaders believed the Republican government in Madrid was the puppet of extreme left Socialists and Communists. Accordingly, the British Cabinet adopted a policy of benevolent neutrality towards the military insurgents, with the covert aim of avoiding any direct or indirect help to the Popular Front Government. Franco had substantial support from Germany and Italy and after 1940 was pressured to join World War II. His terms were too high for Hitler to accept; meanwhile the United Kingdom made a strong, successful effort to keep Spain neutral. In practice, the British government policy was very favourable towards the rebel army. On 27 February 1939, before the Republican defeat in the war, the British cabinet formally approved the recognition of the Francoist government.

Many historians argue that the British policy of non-intervention in the Spanish Civil War was a product of the Establishment's anti-Communism. Scott Ramsay (2019) instead argues that the United Kingdom demonstrated a "benevolent neutrality". It was simply hedging its bets, avoiding favouring one side or the other. The goal was that in a future European war the United Kingdom would enjoy the ‘benevolent neutrality’ of whichever side won in Spain.

=== Second World War ===
During World War II, Spanish nationals were among the prisoners of German forced labour camps in the occupied Channel Islands.

=== Postwar ===
The Labour Party opposed Franco and after it came to power in 1945 relations were frosty. After Franco died in 1975 and the democratisation movement gained power, relations grew friendly, and trade and tourism grew rapidly.

== Royal marriages ==
The former Lesser Royal Coat of Arms of Spain and the Royal Coat of Arms of the United Kingdom in the shield of Victoria Eugenie of Battenberg as Queen of Spain.

- Eleanor of England and Alfonso VIII of Castile
- Richard I of England and Berengaria of Navarre
- Edward I of England and Eleanor of Castile
- John of Gaunt, 1st Duke of Lancaster, and Constance of Castile
- Katherine of Lancaster and Henry III of Castile
- Henry IV of England and Joanna of Navarre
- Arthur, Prince of Wales, and Catherine of Aragon
- Henry VIII of England and Catherine of Aragon
- Mary I of England and Philip II of Spain
- Victoria Eugenie of Battenberg and Alfonso XIII of Spain

== Armed conflict ==
Wars between the British and the Spanish include:

- War of the Spanish Succession (1702–1713)
  - Queen Anne's War (1702–1713)
- War of the Quadruple Alliance (1718–1720)
- Anglo-Spanish War of 1727–1729
- War of Jenkins' Ear (1739–1742), which later merged into the War of the Austrian Succession (1740–1748)
- Anglo-Spanish War of 1761–1763 was part of the Seven Years' War
- Anglo-Spanish War of 1779–1783 was part of the American Revolutionary War
- Anglo-Spanish War of 1796–1807 was part of the French Revolutionary Wars and the Napoleonic Wars

== Present day ==
In the present day, Spain and the United Kingdom maintain civil relations, both being members of NATO, and the OECD. They share a number of regulations due to their previously shared membership of the European Union, several of which remain in force in the UK after its exit from the bloc.

=== Gibraltar ===
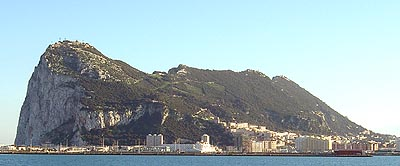
The Rock of Gibraltar.

The status of Gibraltar is a major point of contention in relations between the two nations, dating back to the conflicts in the early 18th century. The official status of Gibraltar is that of a British overseas territory. Captured by Dutch and British troops in 1704, king Philip V of Spain transferred the territory to Great Britain in 1713 under the terms of Article X of the Treaty of Utrecht.

In two referendums, held in September 1967 and November 2002, the people of Gibraltar rejected any proposal for the transfer of sovereignty to Spain. The 2002 referendum was on a proposal for joint sovereignty which at one stage was supported by the UK Government.
Considering the Gibraltarians decolonisation subjects, Spain asserts it is a bilateral issue between sovereign nations on the grounds of the "territorial integrity" clause UN Resolutions, which according to Spain prevails over the right to self-determination to the colonists themselves. On the other hand, Gibraltar's authorities consider Gibraltarian people the legitimate inhabitants of the territory, and therefore entitled to the self-determination right in compliance of the same United Nations' resolutions. Gibraltar's 2006 Constitution Order endorsed and approved by Her Majesty's Government states:

Her Majesty’s Government will never enter into arrangements under which the people of Gibraltar would pass under the sovereignty of another state against their freely and democratically expressed wishes.

In 2008, the UN 4th Committee rejected the claim that a dispute over sovereignty affected self-determination, which was a basic human right.

From May 2000 to May 2001 HMS Tireless moored in Gibraltar, for repairs on the cooling system of its nuclear reactor. The presence of the nuclear vessel in Gibraltar caused outrage among environmentalists and strained relations between Spain and the UK.

In February 2002, the UK formally apologised when a unit of Royal Marines accidentally invaded La Linea de la Concepción's beach instead of Gibraltar's where their planned military training was to be conducted.

In 2004, Spain and the United Kingdom established the Tripartite Forum for Dialogue on Gibraltar, with equal representation of both countries and the British Overseas Territory.

Waters around Gibraltar, declared by the United Kingdom as territorial waters according to the United Nations Convention on the Law of the Sea (to a three-mile limit), and claimed by Spain, are another source of contention, with the Government of Gibraltar actively backing the British position naming the disputed waters as "British Gibraltar territorial waters". In December 2008, the European Commission approved a Spanish request designating most of the waters around Gibraltar as one of Spain's protected nature sites under EU law. This decision is being currently challenged in the European Court of Justice by the Government of Gibraltar, backed by the British government. The Commission will defend its position and, in doing so, will be backed by Spain In May 2009 Gibraltar authorities complained about the presence of a Guardia Civil Maritime Service vessel into the three-mile waters around Gibraltar, escalating to the intervention of Royal Navy Gibraltar Squadron and a diplomatic protest by the Government of the United Kingdom. Further incidents occurred in November 2009, and in February 2019.

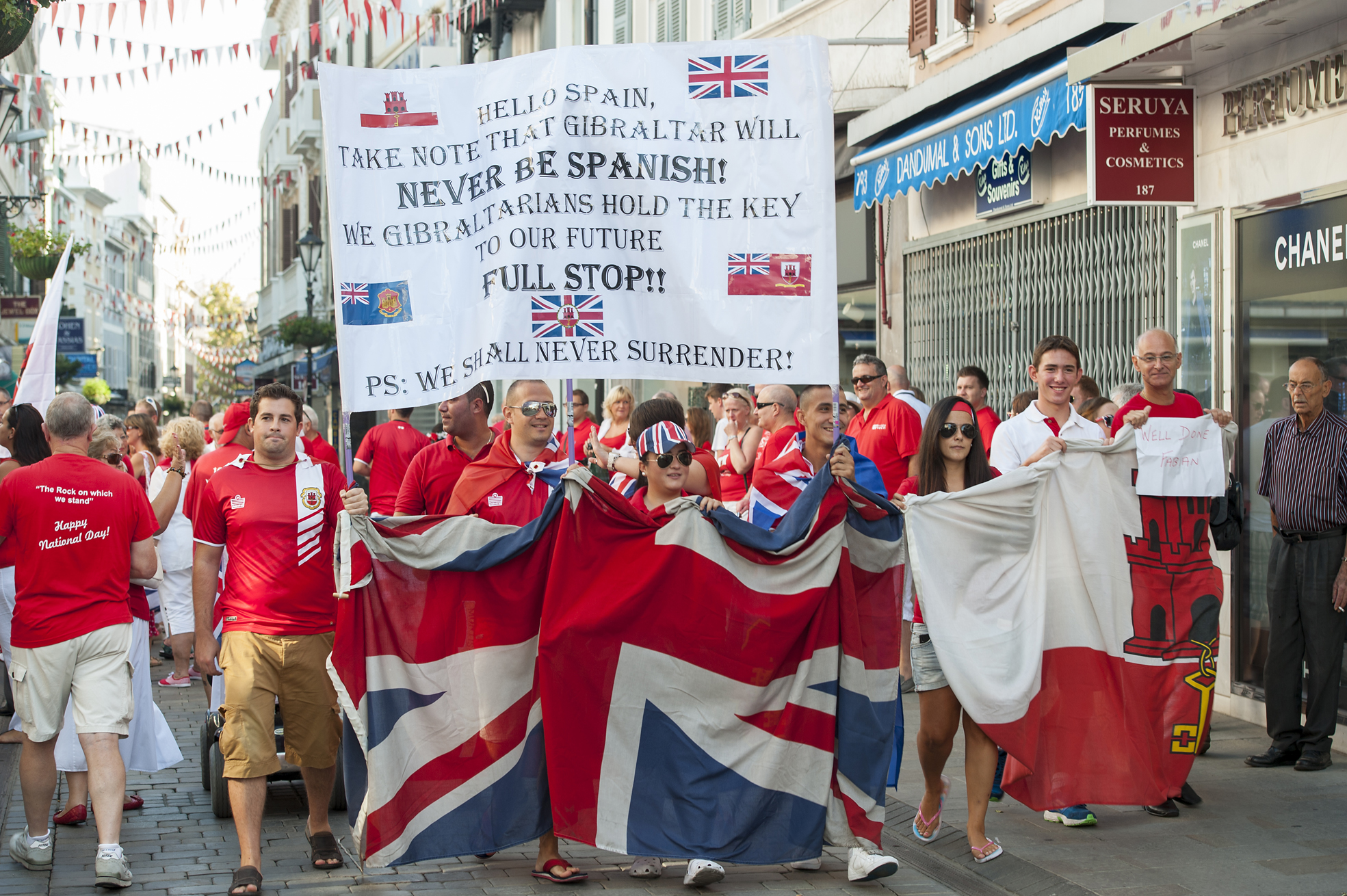
Gibraltarians celebrate the Gibraltar National Day in 2013

In July 2009 Miguel Ángel Moratinos, the Spanish Minister of Foreign Affairs visited Gibraltar to meet the British Foreign Secretary, David Miliband, and Gibraltar's chief minister, Peter Caruana, becoming the first Spanish official to visit the territory since Spain closed its consulate in Gibraltar in the 1950s. The sovereignty issue was not dealt with, given its controversial nature, and the three-way talks focused on other subjects such as cooperation on the environment, maritime matters, and ways of further facilitating the Moroccan community in Gibraltar to transit Spain en route to and from Gibraltar and Morocco.

In December 2009, a Guardia Civil launch entered the Gibraltar harbour. Three armed officers landed in Gibraltar illegally and, along with a fourth, were arrested by the Royal Gibraltar Police. Many such incidents occur, with a more recent event being the arresting of Gibraltarian fisherman inside the waters of Gibraltar, confiscation of equipment and transfer of the individuals to Spain. This was strongly condemned by the UK Government, and the UK's method of quiet diplomacy with Spain was criticised by a local newspaper, which called for more 'open' diplomacy.

Between January and November 2012, around 200 incursions by Spanish vessels into Gibraltar waters were recorded, as opposed to 23 in 2011 and 67 in 2010. In December 2012, one day after an incursion by a Spanish warship, a Royal Navy Type 23 frigate, HMS Sutherland arrived on a scheduled visit. Rather than taking on stores and fuel and proceeding as had been planned, the frigate and its Merlin helicopter conducted a patrol of Gibraltar waters as a message.

The intensity of the disagreement about Gibraltar has been perceived in different ways by the two countries. According to former Spanish prime minister Felipe González, "For the British, Gibraltar is a visit to the dentist once a year when we meet to talk about it. For us, it is a stone in the shoe all day long".

=== Fishing dispute ===
The United Kingdom and Spain have had several recent disputes over fishing rights, particularly with regards to the European Union's Common Fisheries Policy. When Spain became a member state in 1986, it had the world's sixth largest fishing fleet, and much of the economies of Galicia, Asturias, and Cantabria depended upon catches by Spanish boats outside Spain's national Exclusive Economic Zone, just as they do today.

To prevent the fleets of other EU members (particularly Spain) taking up the UK's Common Fisheries Policy quota, the UK sought to create a framework that discriminated between British- and Spanish-owned boats, regardless of flag flown, so that its waters wouldn't be over-fished by foreign-owned trawlers. Due to fishing's importance to some of the regional economies of Spain, the Spanish government protested vehemently, but had no power to prevent the UK determining its own domestic policies. However, when the Single European Act was implemented, in 1987, this became illegal under EU law, and a Spanish company successfully challenged the right of the British government to prevent Spanish fishermen taking up the British quota in what has now become known as the Factortame case. In total, £55m has been paid out by the British government to Spanish parties (both public and private) for loss of earnings.

To this day, the large Spanish fishing fleet does the majority of its fishing outside Spain's EEZ, as far away as Canada and Namibia. Nonetheless, a large part of its business comes from fishing in the waters of northern Europe, particularly those of the United Kingdom and Ireland. At times of debate of the United Kingdom's declining fish stocks, this has caused strained relations between Spain and the UK, and particularly between Spain and the membership of the devolved Scottish institutions, since Scotland is more dependent upon fishing than the rest of the UK.

=== Scotland and Catalonia ===
Scotland held a referendum on independence from the UK on 18 September 2014. In November 2013 the Spanish Prime Minister Mariano Rajoy had stated that an independent Scotland would have to reapply for membership of the European Union, causing considerable irritation to the Scottish Government. Relations between the Spanish and British governments deteriorated further when the Scottish Government alleged that a senior UK Treasury official visited Spain ostensibly to co-ordinate British and Spanish opposition to the independence movements in Scotland and Catalonia. Rajoy was one of the few European heads of government to explicitly voice opposition to Scottish independence, primarily due to his fears that it would encourage the separatist drive in Catalonia. On the issue of Catalan independence, Prime Minister David Cameron had said that "I don't believe that, in the end, [it's right to] try to ignore these questions of nationality, independence, identity"... I think it's right to make your arguments, take them on and then you let the people decide" though he also added that "I would never presume to tell people in Spain how to meet these challenges themselves; it's a matter for the Spanish Government and the Spanish Prime Minister."

=== Migration ===
The 2001 UK Census recorded 54,482 Spanish-born people living in the UK. In comparison, it is estimated that 990,000 British-born people live in Spain. Of these, according to the BBC and contrary to popular belief, only about 21.5% are over the age of 65.

In 2011, Spanish migration to the UK went up 85%. As for 2012, it was recorded that 69,097 Spanish-born people live in the United Kingdom. On the other hand, in the same period 397,535 British-born people were living in Spain

=== Twinnings ===
The list below is of British and Spanish town twinnings.

- Carmarthen, Wales and As Pontes, Galicia
- Chesham, England and Archena, Region of Murcia
- Edinburgh, Scotland and Segovia, Castile and León
- Glasgow, Scotland and Barcelona, Catalonia
- Kilmarnock, Scotland and Santa Coloma de Gramenet, Catalonia
- Lymington, England and Almansa, Castilla–La Mancha
- Manchester, England and Córdoba, Andalusia
- Nuneaton and Bedworth, England and Guadalajara, Castilla–La Mancha
- Peterborough, England and Alcalá de Henares, Community of Madrid
- Plymouth, England and San Sebastián, Basque Country
- Sherborne, England and Altea, Valencian Community
- Stafford, England and Tarragona, Catalonia
- Totnes, England and Santa Fe, Andalusia

== Economic relations ==
The United Kingdom and Spain have close economic ties based on significant bilateral trade flows and investment. In 2024, the United Kingdom exported goods and services worth £20.9 billion to Spain and imported goods and services worth £44.5 billion from Spain. This made Spain the seventh largest trading partner for the British. In the same year, Spanish direct investment in the UK amounted to around £18 billion. Conversely, British investment in Spain amounted to around £90 billion in 2016, including investments by global British corporations in the pharmaceutical, energy, and automotive industries. Numerous large companies from both countries have gained a foothold in each other's markets. The expansion of Spanish companies in the UK since the 2000s is particularly striking. For example, Banco Santander has acquired several British banks and employs almost 20,000 people in the UK. Numerous major British companies such as Rolls Royce, GSK, Diageo, and BP, as well as numerous banks and insurance companies, are also represented in Spain. In 2011, the Spanish airline Iberia merged with British Airways to form the International Airlines Group (IAG).

Tourism plays a prominent role in economic relations. Spain has been the favourite travel destination for British tourists for decades. In 2019, over 18 million British tourists visited Spain, accounting for around 21–22% of all foreign visitors to Spain. This made the United Kingdom by far the largest source market for the Spanish tourism sector, ahead of Germany and France. British tourists, many of whom are regular visitors, spent just under €18 billion in Spain, more than visitors from any other country. Conversely, many Spaniards also travel to the UK, albeit in significantly smaller numbers. City tourism (e.g., to London) and the language travel market (English courses) are important in this regard. Millions of people commute across the border every year: air traffic between the UK and Spain alone was among the busiest in the world before the crisis, with over 30 million passengers per year. This means that the volume of travel between the UK and Spain even exceeds that of neighbours such as the US and Canada.

Following Brexit, Trade between the United Kingdom and Spain is governed by the EU–UK Trade and Cooperation Agreement since 1 January 2021.

== Cultural relations ==
Cultural relations between the United Kingdom and Spain are intense and diverse, supported by exchanges in areas such as education, language, art, popular culture, and civil society. An important vehicle for cultural relations is mutual language and educational exchange. As early as 1940—in the midst of a politically difficult period—the British Council opened its first office and school in Madrid to promote the English language and British culture in Spain, and today it has several branches throughout the country. A bilingual education program has been in place since the 1990s, and English is widely spoken as a foreign language in Spain. Conversely, Spain is keen to maintain a presence for its culture in the United Kingdom. Founded in 1991, the Instituto Cervantes runs a cultural centre in London and branches (e.g., in Manchester and Leeds) that offer Spanish courses and organize Spanish cultural events. Spanish is very popular as a foreign language in the UK; it is one of the most popular second foreign languages in schools and universities. Close ties also exist in the field of higher education and research. Following the end of British participation in the Erasmus Programme, a bilateral education agreement was signed in 2023 to mutually recognise university entrance qualifications and promote exchange programs.

There is lively mutual reception in the arts and media. British literature—from Shakespeare to Harry Potter—is widely read in Spain, while Spanish authors (such as Cervantes' Don Quixote or contemporary writers such as Carlos Ruiz Zafón) are well known and have been translated in the UK. There are also diverse contacts in film and music: British musicians regularly perform at major festivals in Spain, and Spanish filmmakers find an interested audience in London. Joint productions and cultural exchange programs (e.g., as part of the British Council Arts Program or Spanish Culture Weeks in the UK) strengthen mutual understanding. In 2016, Spain and the UK jointly celebrated the 400th anniversary of the deaths of Miguel de Cervantes and William Shakespeare with events on both sides of the Channel.

Sport plays a special role as a unifying element of popular culture. In association football —the most popular sport in both countries and brought to Spain by British exiles—there is a natural rivalry as well as mutual appreciation. Spanish football stars (such as David Silva, Fernando Torres, and David De Gea) have played in the Premier League, while British coaches and players such as John Toshack, David Beckham, and Jude Bellingham have been or are active in Spanish clubs. European Cup matches between top English and Spanish teams attract a lot of attention in both countries and the Spanish and English national football teams have also faced each other frequently, including in important matches such as the final of the UEFA Euro 2024.

== Resident diplomatic missions ==
of Spain in the United Kingdom

- London (Embassy)
- London (Consulate-General)
- Edinburgh (Consulate-General)
- Manchester (Consulate-General)

of the United Kingdom in Spain

- Madrid (Embassy)
- Barcelona (Consulate-General)
- Alicante (Consulate)
- Ibiza (Consulate)
- Las Palmas (Consulate)
- Málaga (Consulate)
- Palma de Mallorca (Consulate)
- Santa Cruz de Tenerife (Consulate)

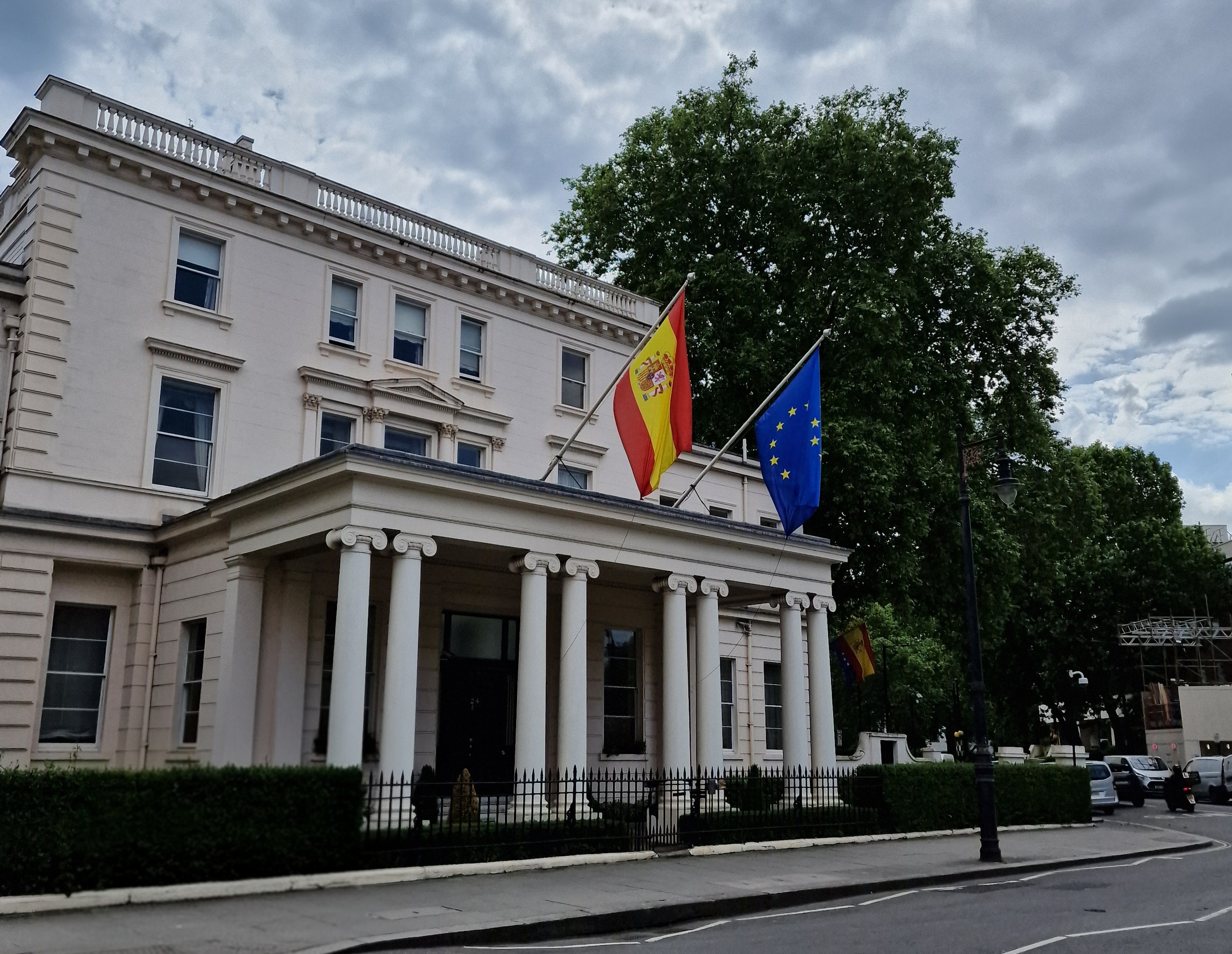
Embassy of Spain in London

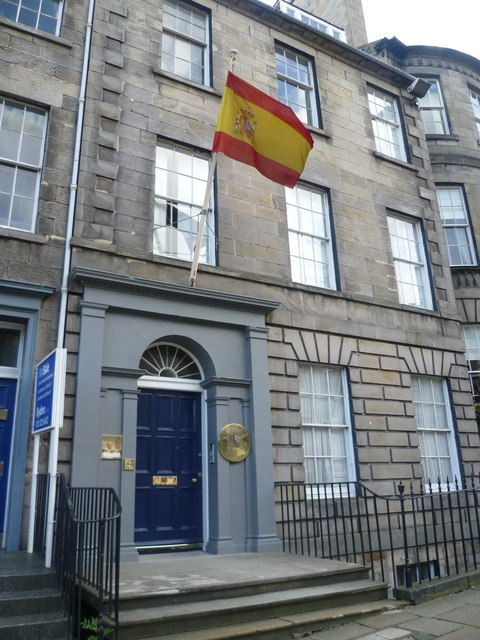
Consulate-General of Spain in Edinburgh

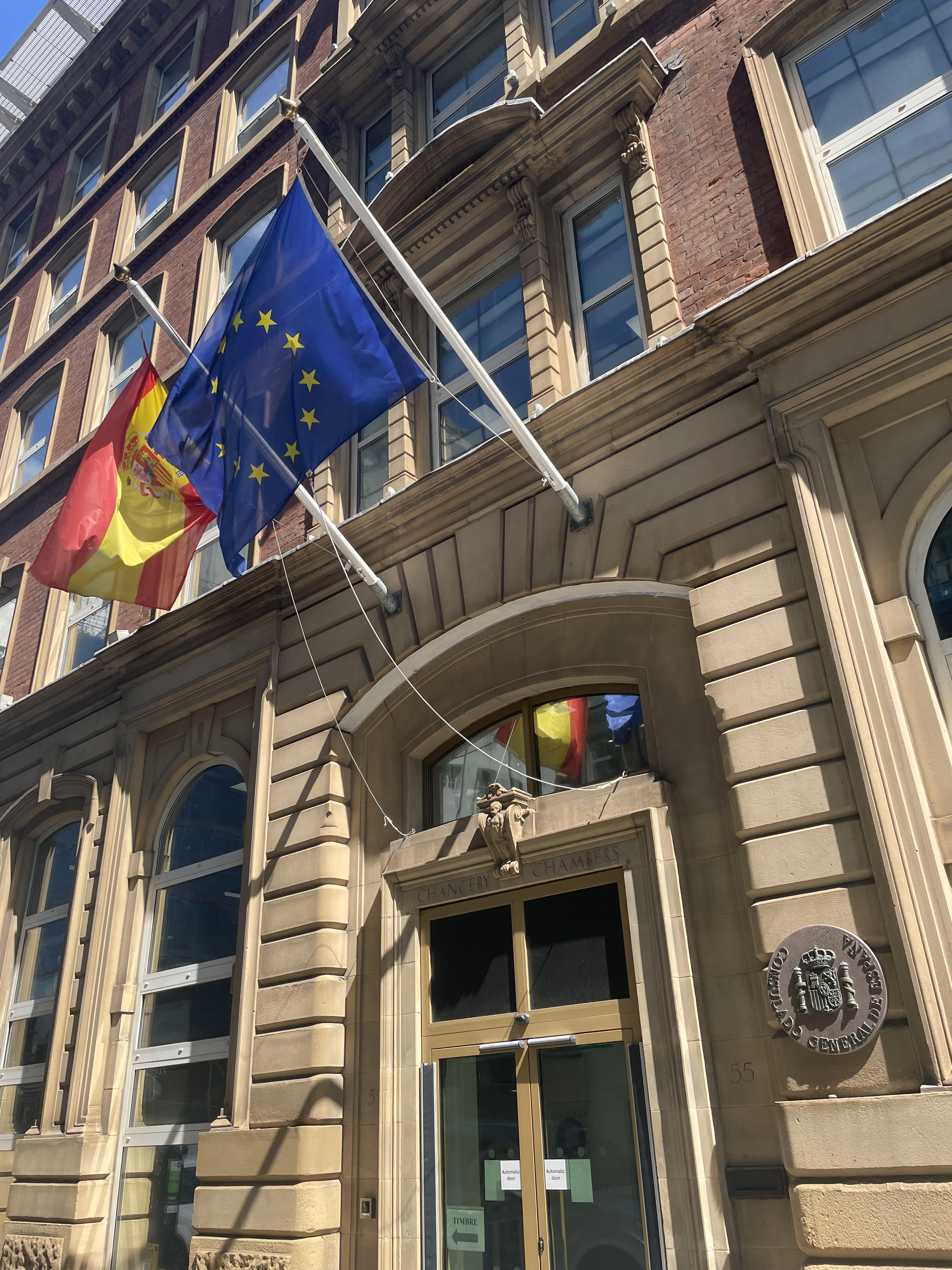
Consulate-General of Spain in Manchester
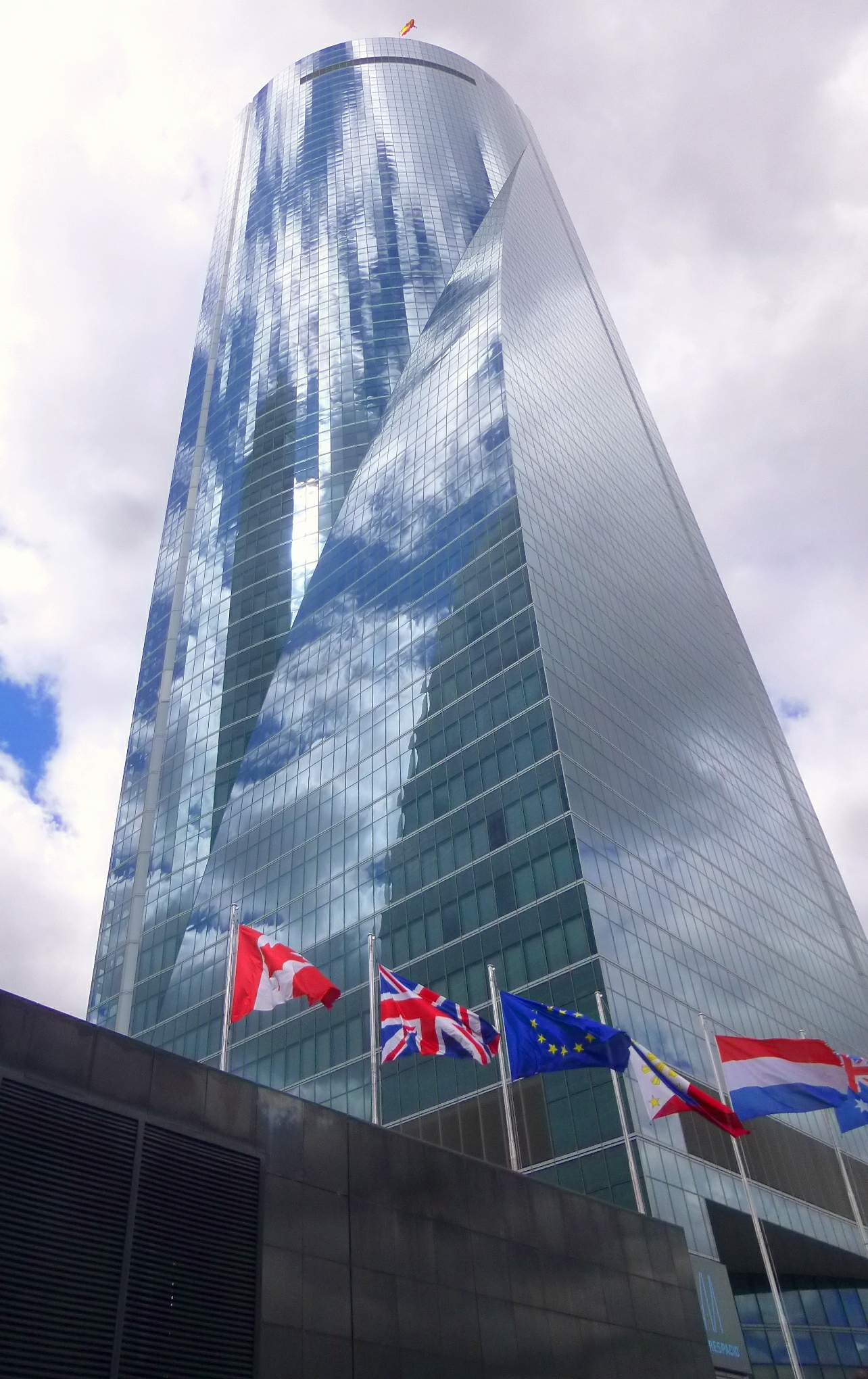
Torre Emperador hosting the Embassy of the United Kingdom in Madrid

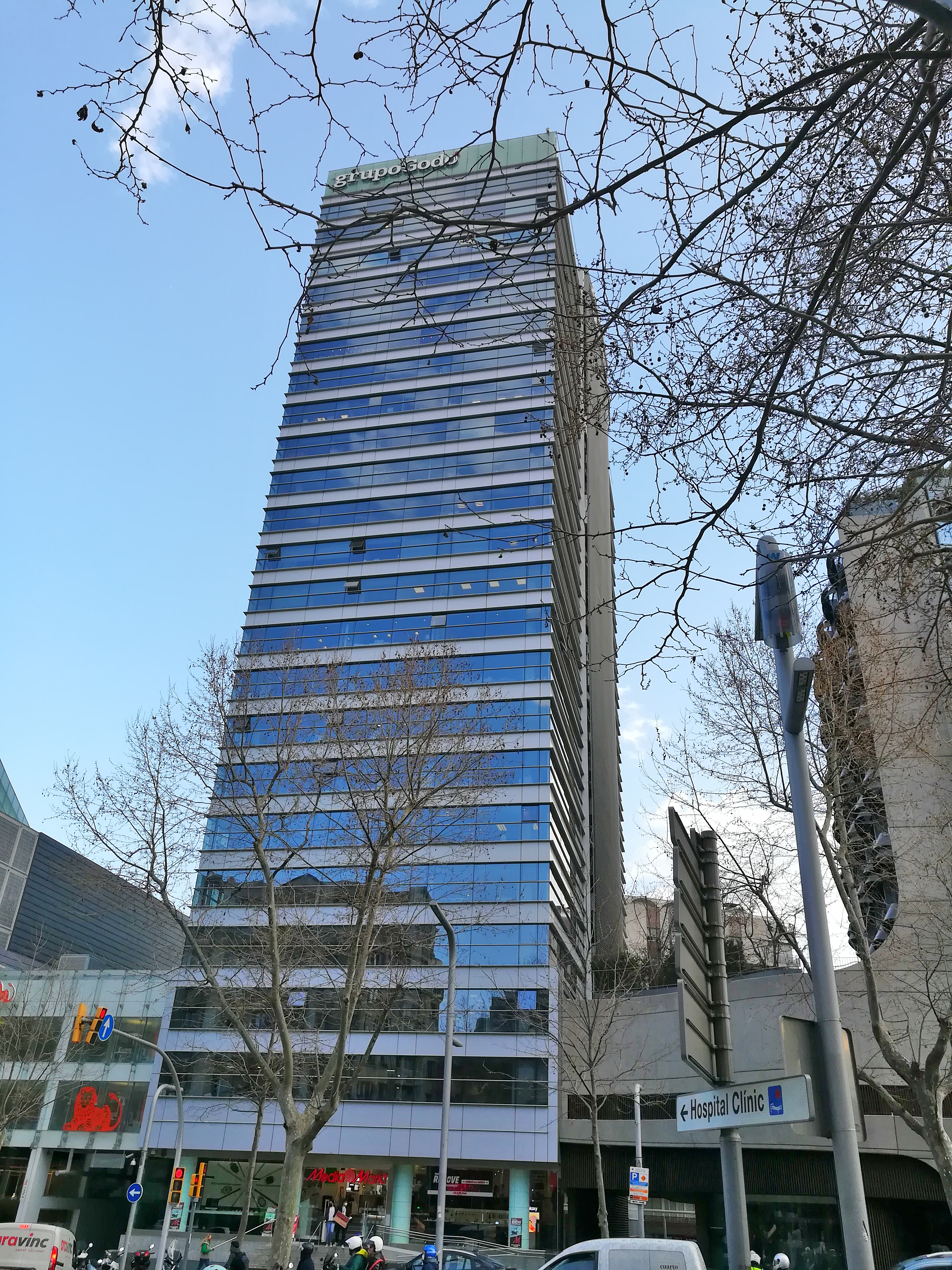
Building hosting the Consulate-General of the United Kingdom in Barcelona

== See also ==
- Foreign relations of Spain
- Foreign relations of the United Kingdom
- List of ambassadors of Spain to the United Kingdom
- Ambassadors from the United Kingdom to Spain
- United Kingdom–European Union relations
- Spanish in the United Kingdom
- British in Spain
