= John Sampson (North Carolina politician) =

John Sampson (1719–1784) was a politician in North Carolina during and after the American Colonial era. After immigrating to the colony from northern Ireland, he settled near Wilmington. He was appointed to local offices, raised a militia to defend against the Spanish Alarm, and served as a Revolutionary War Patriot militia officer. He was an early settler in Duplin County, North Carolina. He served as mayor of Wilmington, North Carolina starting in 1760.

Sampson County, North Carolina is named in honor of him.

== Early life ==
John Sampson was born in 1719 and grew up in Ireland. He immigrated as a youth or young man to the colony of North Carolina in North America in the 1730s or 1740s, settling in the Wilmington, North Carolina, area. He appeared to have become established before the Spanish Alarm of 1747. He developed a farm there, and married and had a family.

== Military career ==
The War of the Austrian Succession brought military battle close to Sampson in 1747. He was called upon to raise a militia company of men in New Hanover County to protect against any Spanish raids or invasions from Florida. Spanish forces raided the coastal towns of the Carolinas and Georgia during the period known as the Spanish Alarm, extending into the 1740s.

In 1771, Sampson served as a Lieutenant General in the Colonial Militia of the Royal Governor William Tryon, fighting against members of the Regulator Rebellion in Halifax, North Carolina. Governor Tryon ordered Sampson to raise several hundred men from Duplin County in order to help.

There was widespread fighting and civil disobedience: county justices of the peace, such as future state governor Alexander Martin, were attacked and flogged on the street by Regulators. The Regulator Rebellion forces outnumbered those of the colonial militia by a two-to-one ratio. Governor Tryon led an attack in what became known as the Battle of Alamance, which resulted in eight to 12 men killed and as many as 100 wounded. Several of the captains of the Regulator's Militia were taken prisoner and later executed by Tryon. John Sampson appeared to support the Continental Militia during the Revolutionary War.

== Political career ==
Sampson was appointed as the first Register of Deeds for Duplin County for the first two years after the county had been created in 1750 from New Hanover County, North Carolina. A decade later, Sampson was elected in 1760 as the first mayor of the strategic port of Wilmington, North Carolina.

During the administration of Colonial Governor William Tryon, Sampson was a member of his Executive Council. He is believed to have continued in this role after the Halifax Constitution of 1776 was signed and Richard Caswell became Governor of the state.

== Legacy ==
Sampson's stepson, Richard Clinton, and his biological son, James Sampson, also became important political and military figures during the American Revolution and the early years of the 19th century. Sampson County, North Carolina, is named in honor of General John Sampson.
