= Richard Clinton =

Richard Clinton may refer to:

- Richard Clinton (cricketer), English cricketer
- Richard Clinton (politician), American politician
