= Embassy of the United Kingdom, Madrid =

Chief diplomatic mission of the United Kingdom in Spain

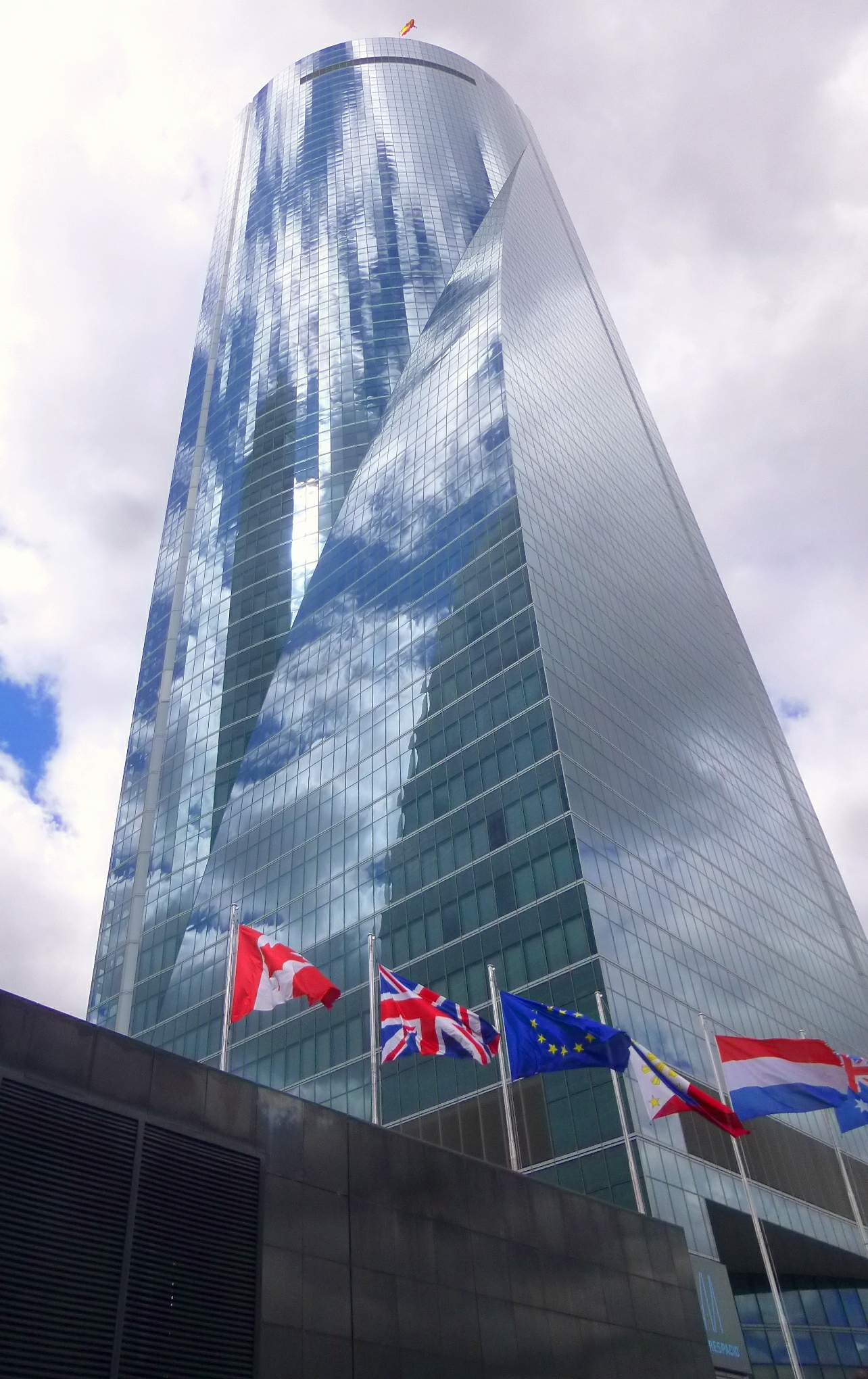
- Location of the embassy
- Location: Madrid, Spain
- Address: Torre Espacio, Paseo de la Castellana 259D, Madrid 28046
- Coordinates: 40.4791°N 3.6868°W
- Ambassador: Sir Alex Ellis
- Website: British Embassy, Madrid

The Embassy of the United Kingdom in Madrid is the chief diplomatic mission of the United Kingdom in Spain. Since 2009 the embassy has been located in the Torre Emperador in the Cuatro Torres Business Area. The current British Ambassador to Spain is Sir Alex Ellis.

== History ==
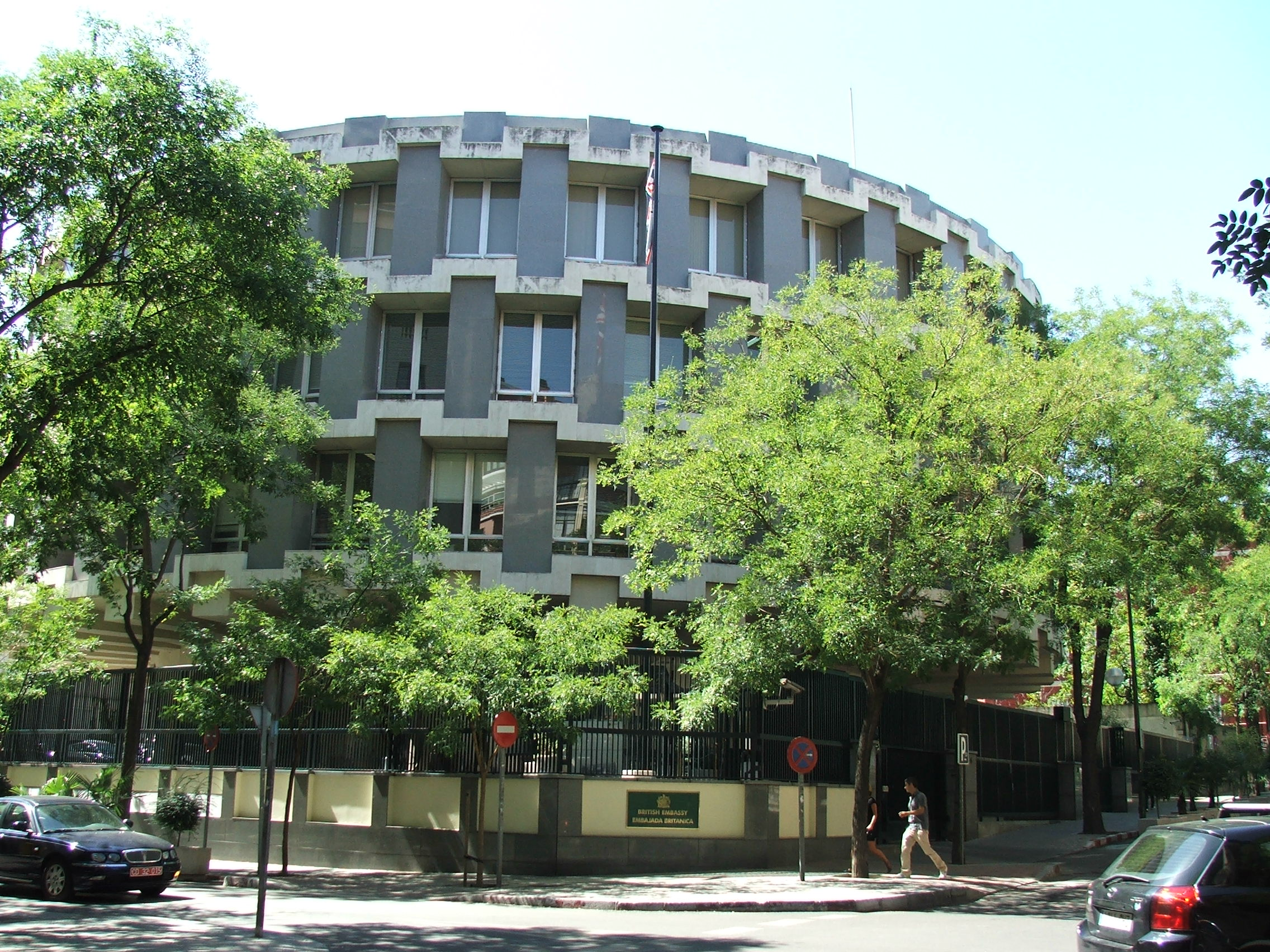
Former location of the British Embassy in Madrid (1966–2008)

In 2009, the British Embassy in Madrid moved to its current location in the Torre Emperador, which was designed by Pei Cobb Freed. The Torre Espacio is also home to a number of other foreign diplomatic missions, including the Australian and Canadian embassies. Prior to moving to Torre Espacio, the British Embassy was located on Fernando el Santo Street in a building designed by architect William S. Bryant in 1966.

== Other locations ==
Outside Madrid, there is a British Consulate General in Barcelona where the senior officer is known as the Consul-General. There are also Consulates in Alicante, Ibiza, Las Palmas de Gran Canaria, Málaga, Palma de Mallorca and Santa Cruz de Tenerife.

The embassy also represents the British Overseas Territories in Spain.

== See also ==
- Spain-United Kingdom relations
- List of diplomatic missions in Spain
- List of ambassadors of the United Kingdom to Spain
