= Brunswick Town raid =

Spanish naval attack on British America during the War of Jenkins' Ear

- Part of the War of Jenkins' Ear
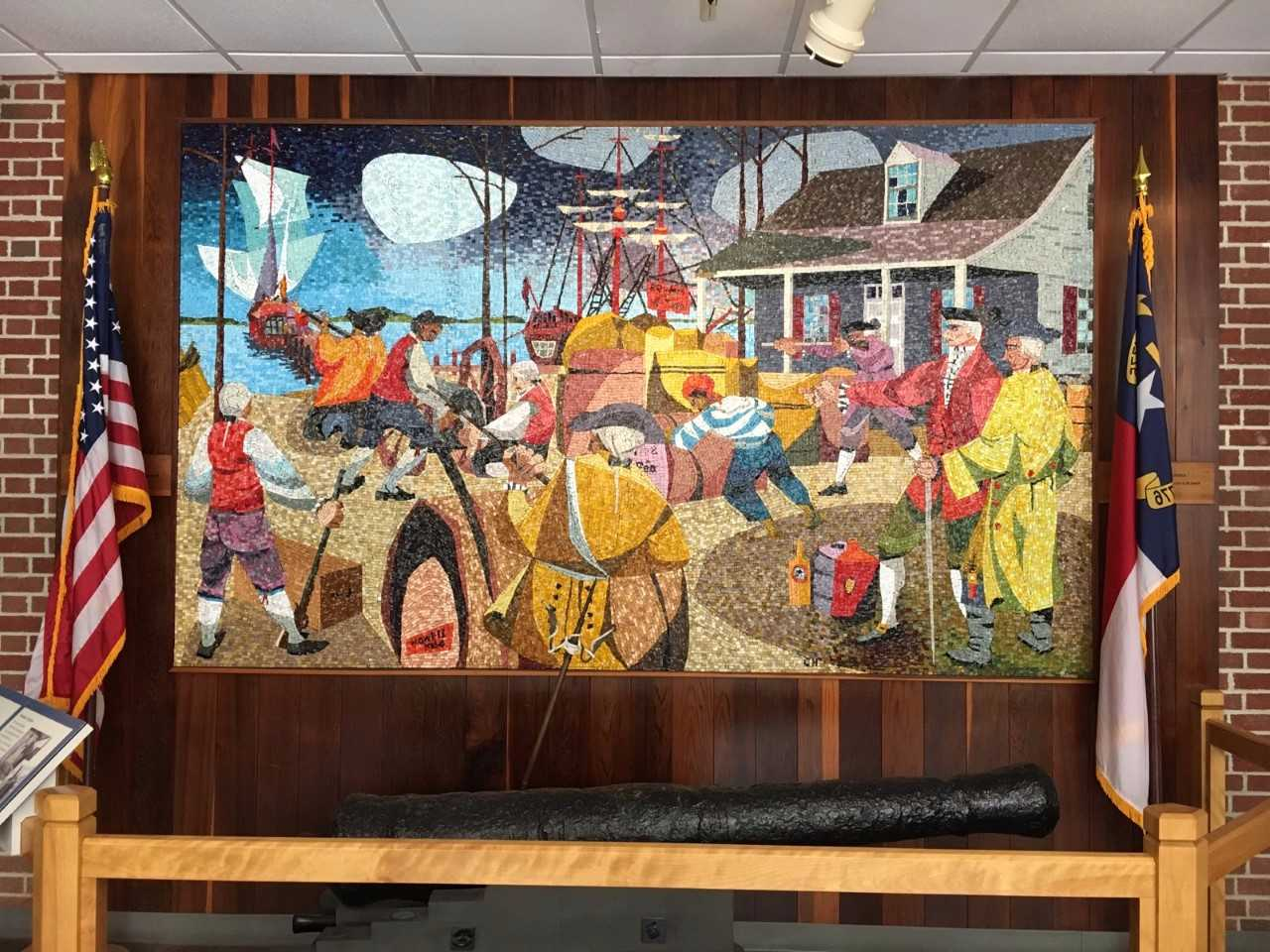
- Mosaic depicting the Spanish attack
Date	September 3–6, 1748
Location	Brunswick Town, North Carolina 34°2′N 77°56′W
Result	British victory

Belligerents
Great Britain; North Carolina	Spain

Commanders and leaders
William Dry III	Vincent Lopez †

Strength
67 militiamen	2 ships

Casualties and losses
1 killed 2 wounded	140 killed, wounded, or missing 29 captured 1 ship destroyed
- Location within North Carolina

The Brunswick Town raid was an attack on Brunswick Town, North Carolina, conducted by Spanish privateers between September 3 and 6, 1748, during the War of Jenkins' Ear. The raiders were eventually driven off, which resulted in the destruction of one of their vessels. It was the final engagement of the war and resulted in a British victory.

== Prelude ==
The War of Jenkins' Ear, which had begun in 1739 which was originally fought in the West Indies and the Americas had by 1748 amalgamated into the War of the Austrian Succession and spread on both sides of the Atlantic. The Spanish Government sanctioned forces to raid and pillage English port towns of the provinces of North Carolina, South Carolina and Georgia. This period became known as the 'Spanish Alarm'. Without an adequate regular military garrison in these provinces, the Kingdom of Great Britain encouraged the provinces to raise local militias to combat Spanish-related attacks.

The Port of Brunswick Town became the busiest in North Carolina and shipped goods to Europe and the British West Indies. Cape Fear was a perfect place for the Spanish to attack. Despite the ongoing Treaty of Aix-la-Chapelle which had convened in April 1748, news still had not reached some parts of the American colonies.

== Raid ==
On September 4, 1748, two Spanish ships, La Fortuna and La Loretta anchored off the town. The townspeople fled into the neighbouring woods, and the Spanish began raiding the town for slaves and anything else they could find that was valuable. Since the townspeople had left everything behind, the Spanish were able to raid the abandoned property. Then having landed men ashore they then plundered houses and other buildings without resistance.

The following day Captain William Dry III rallied a group of around 67 men who were armed with muskets and pistols to take back the town. Dry with the help of William Moore, Schenk Moore, Edward Wingate, Cornelius Harnett Jr. and William Lord started the counterattack on September 6. Among the men was also a slave who was volunteered by George Ronalds. The Spanish were surprised by the attack and in the ensuing fire fight they were slowly driven off and soon fled from the town. Ten of the privateers were killed and thirty were captured. During the retreat and an exchange of fire La Fortuna suddenly exploded which killed most of the men on board. The second ship, La Loretta, in confusion thinking that they would suffer the same fate surrendered on the condition that they would be able to leave.

Colonists aboard one of the captured vessels, overpowered their Spanish captors, and ran the ship aground. Over night, Major John Swan arrived with 130 reinforcements from Wilmington. Swan's force held up just outside of town until daylight, in order to prevent being mistaken as a Spanish force by the embattled Brunswick Town defenders. In the meantime, the Spanish privateers took advantage of the darkness to weigh anchor and make sail for the mouth of the Cape Fear and the safety of the open sea. With no further prisoner exchange, the Spanish hoisted anchor and departed the area.

During the counterattack, a number of the townspeople were wounded while only one person defending the town lost his life. The slave that was volunteered by Ronalds was killed when a small cannon exploded.

== Aftermath ==
The remains of La Fortuna, was still in the river when the remainder of the privateers had been thrown out of the town. Dry hired sailors to searchLa Fortuna for anything valuable - they were able to bring ashore guns, anchors and items stolen from the town. Many of the Spanish were enslaved for the remainder of their lives after the failure of the prisoner exchange. The retaliatory action by the Brunswick men not only saved their town but also thwarted any intention by the Spanish to sail upriver to threaten Wilmington. The booty from the Spanish privateers made Brunswick Town one of the richest towns in British North America.

The town was able to sell the Spanish slaves and goods from the abandoned ship. The funds that were obtained from the sales were used to build Saint Phillips Church in Brunswick Town and Saint James Church in Wilmington. Among the items confiscated from the ship was a painting titled, Ecce Homo salvaged from Spanish captain Lopez's cabin. The painting was given to Saint James Church, Wilmington upon completion in 1751 by the North Carolina Assembly. The painting can be found there today.

On July 24, 2025, East Carolina University announced the discovery of 47 wooden shipwreck timbers believed to be part of La Fortuna. The timbers were remarkably well preserved, with most retaining their original shipwright's tool marks.

== Captain William Drys Militia Company ==
Militia Personnel

The Militia at this engagement was composed of any man who had a musket or a pistol. Some men had a slave go in their place.

- Captain William Dry
- Lieutenant J. Moore Schenck
- Ensign William Moore
- Sergeant Edward Wingate

Privates

- Eleazor Allen
- James Bell
- John Bell
- Thomas Bell
- John Blake
- Henry Bosheer
- Christopher Cain
- Duncan Cowen
- John Daniels
- Thomas Davis
- William Davis
- John Davis, Jr.
- Thomas Fletcher
- James Galloway
- George Gibbes
- John Gibbes
- William Grady
- John Grange
- John Hall
- Cornelius Harnett
- James Hasell, Jr.
- Simon Howard
- John Jane
- Samuel Jarvis
- John Leay
- Harrison Lewis
- James Lewis
- Joseph Lewis
- William Lewis
- Peter Lord
- John Lucas
- Berringer Moore
- James Moore
- John Moore
- Maurice Moore, Sr.
- Benjamin Morrison
- George Nicholas
- Isaac Ogden
- Soloman Ogden
- Edward Pemberton
- Edward Porter
- John Potter
- Francis Rhodes
- George Richardson
- Henry Shaw
- Henry Simmons
- Jacob Simmons
- John Simmons
- Edward Simpson
- William Simpson, Sr.
- John Sulivant
- Francis Thomas
- John Watters
- Joseph Watters
- William Watters
- Burgess White
- Thomas White
- Hope Willis
- John Wingate
- Edward Wingate, Jr.
- John Wooldrick
- John Wright
