= Torre Emperador =

Skyscraper in Madrid, Spain

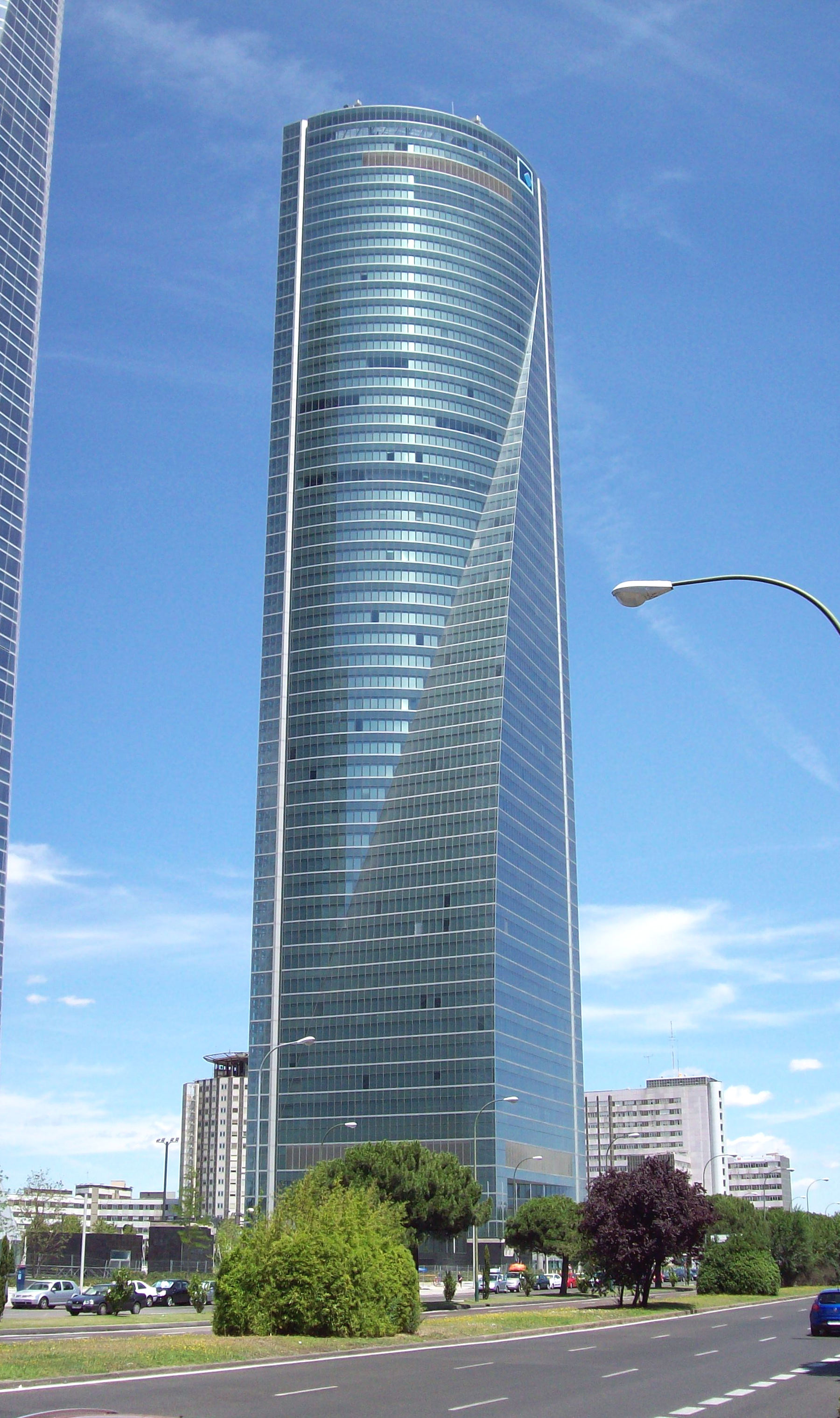
- View from south-east angle
- Interactive map of the Torre Emperador area

General information
- Type: Office
- Location: Pº de la Castellana 259, CTBA, Madrid, Spain
- Coordinates: 40°28′44″N 3°41′12″W
- Construction started: 2004
- Completed: 2008
- Owner: Grupo Emperador S.A.U

Height
- Roof: 230 m (750 ft)

Technical details
- Floor count: 51
- Lifts/elevators: 27 (Made by Schindler Group)

Design and construction
- Architect: Pei Cobb Freed
- Developer: Inmobiliaria Espacio
- Structural engineer: MC2 Estudio de Ingenieria
- Main contractor: OHL

Website
- Official website

The Torre Emperador Castellana, simply known as Torre Emperador and formerly named Torre Espacio (Spanish for Space Tower), is an office skyscraper in Madrid, Spain, standing at 230 m (750 ft) tall and containing 57 floors. It is currently the fourth tallest building in Madrid.

== Construction ==
=== Architecture ===
During its construction on the night of 4 September 2006, a fire broke out on the 43rd floor of the tower. The structure of the building suffered no critical damage, as the fire had only affected some construction materials.

The structure was topped out on 19 March 2007. That night, Madrid mayor Alberto Ruiz Gallardón attended a ceremony with fireworks to commemorate the event. With its 230 m, it also became the tallest structure in Spain at that time, surpassing the telecommunications tower Torrespaña. Torre de Cristal, one of the neighbouring skyscrapers at the Cuatro Torres Business Area, surpassed the height of Torre Espacio in April 2007.

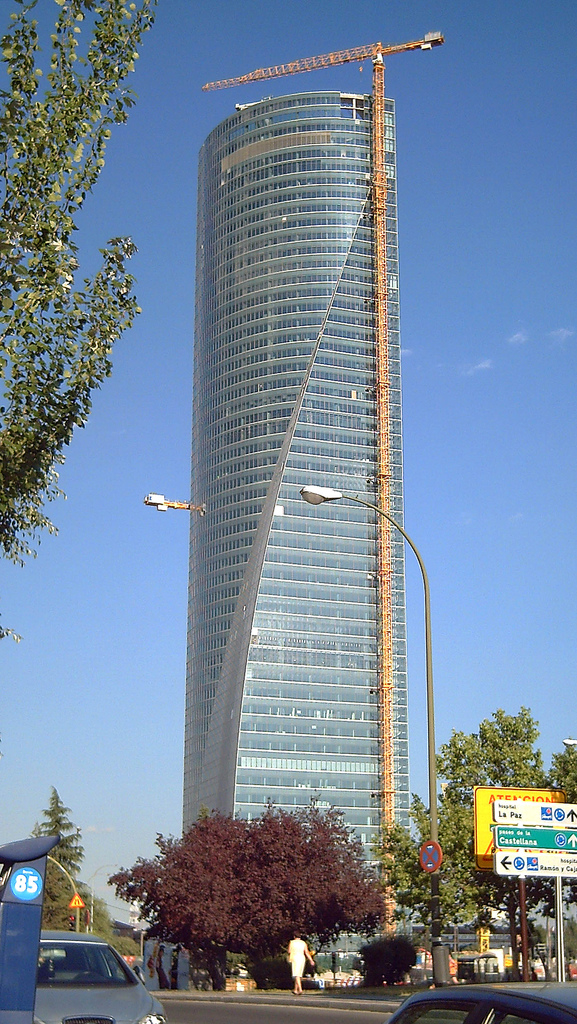
Torre Emperador at completion

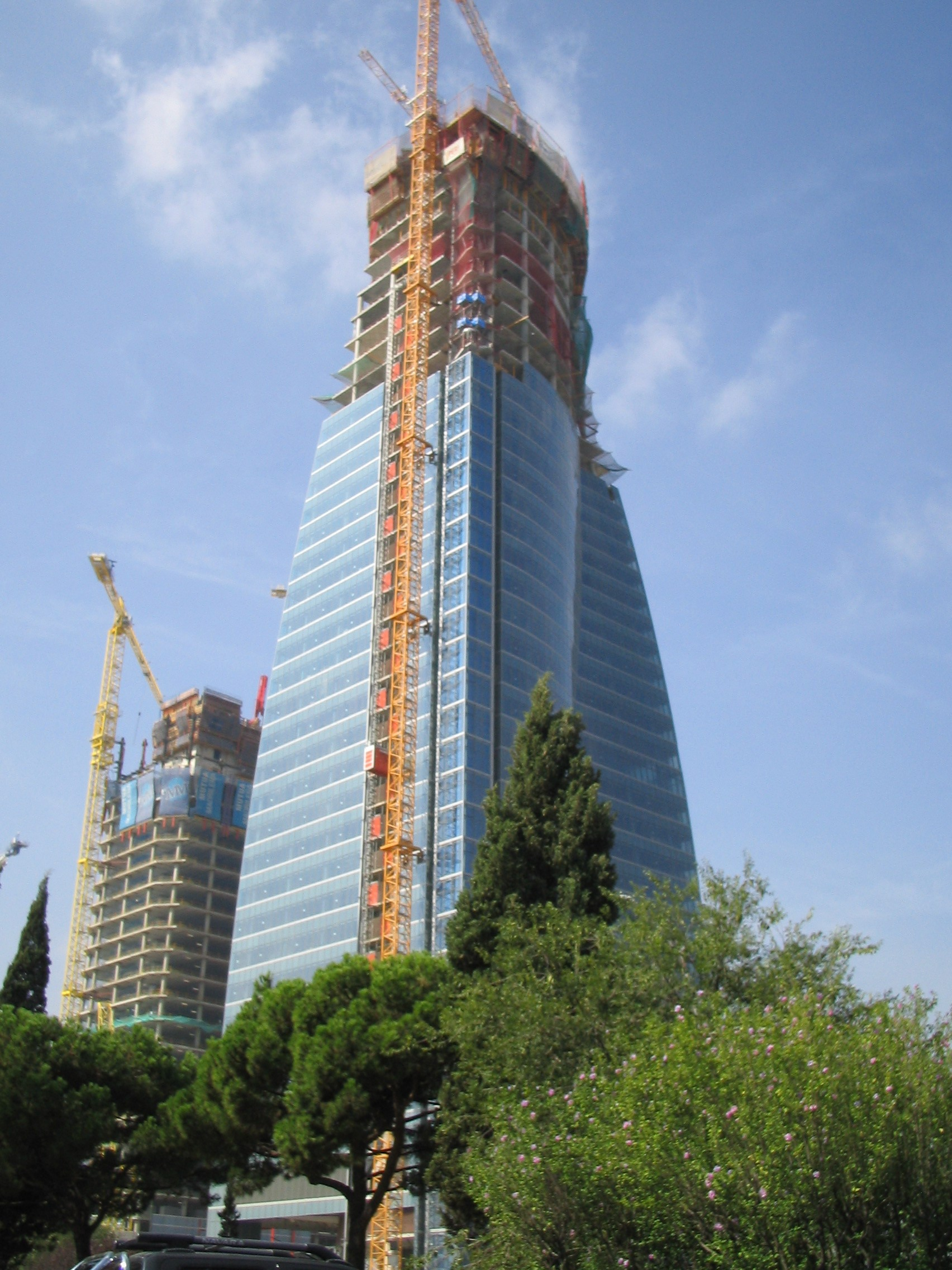
Torre Emperador under construction

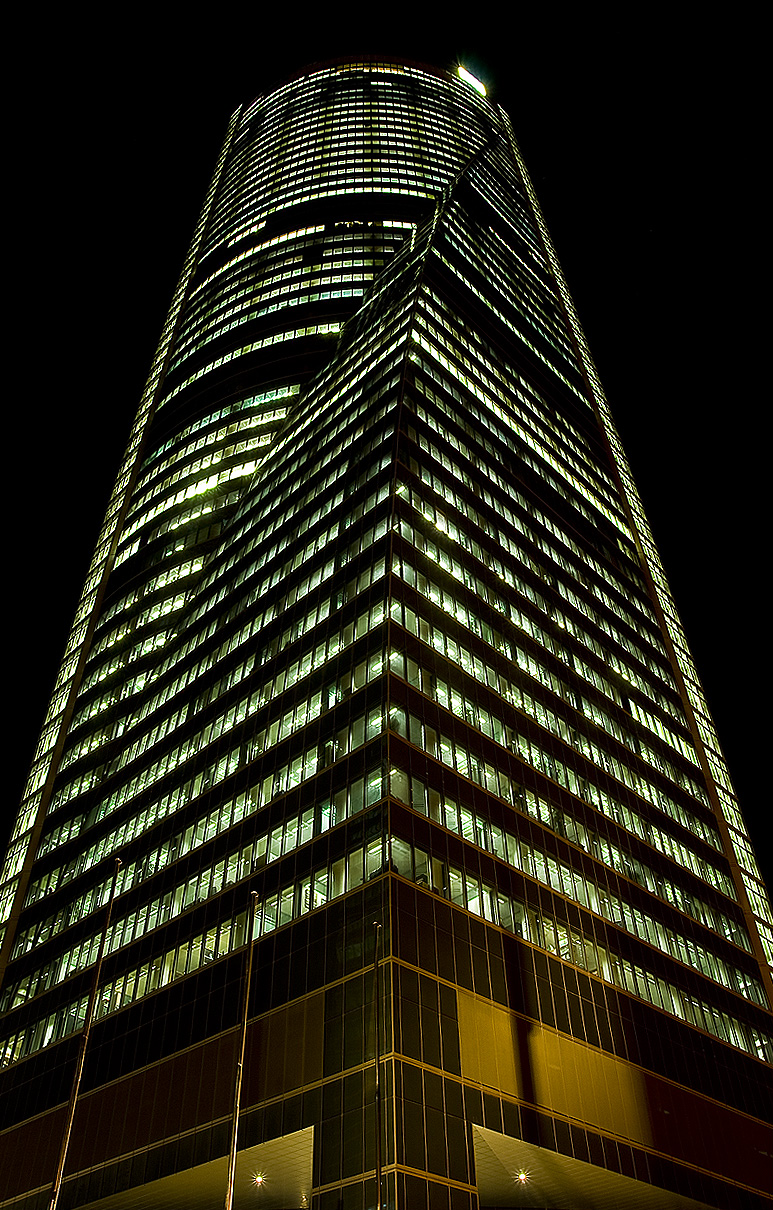
Night view of the Torre Emperador

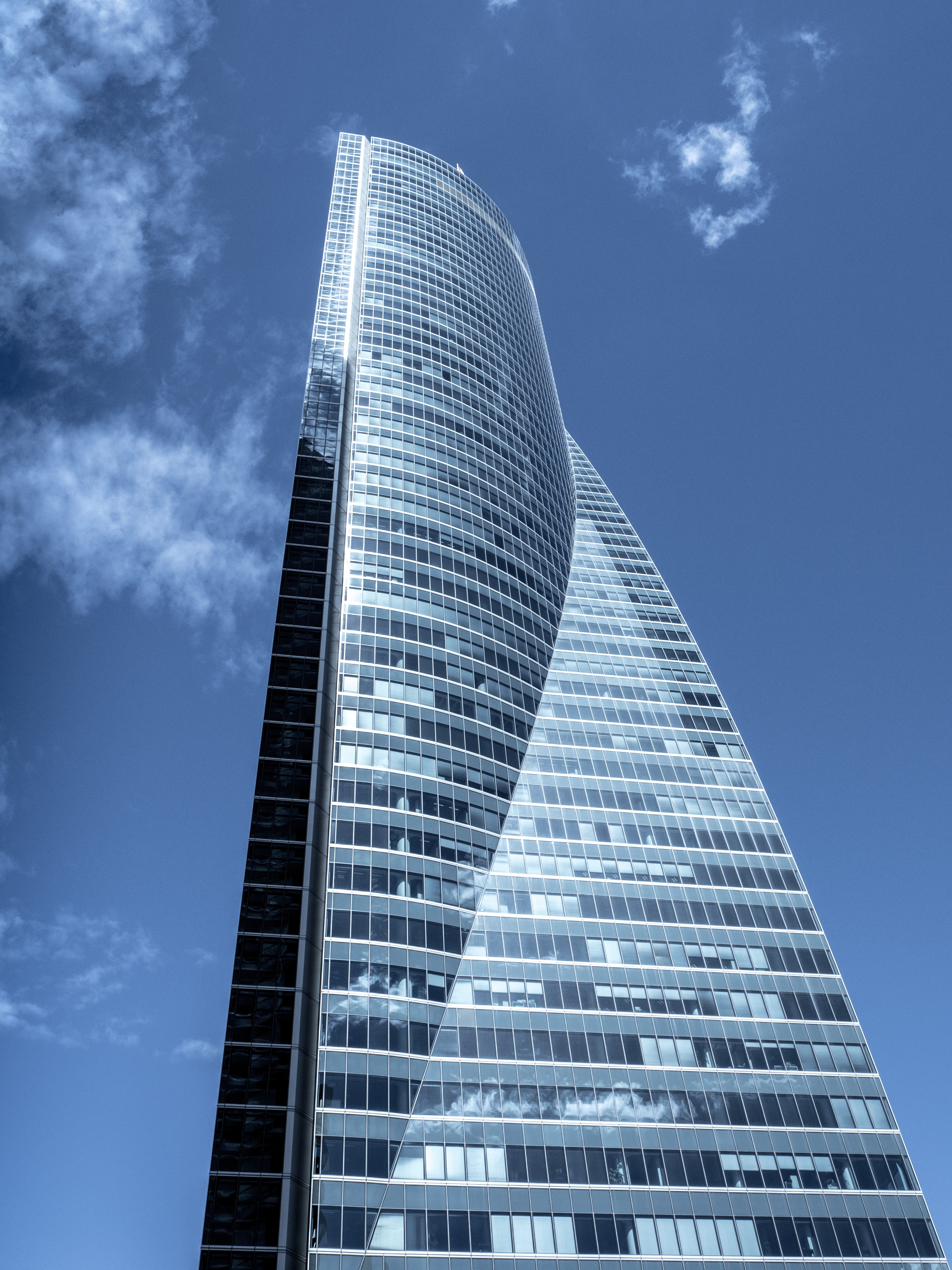
Close up of the Torre Emperador

Rotating model of Torre Emperador with floors colour-coded by designation. In the SVG file, hover over a floor to highlight it.

The building project was featured on the Discovery Channel's Build It Bigger series due to the skyscraper's unique form and shape.

=== Design ===
It was designed by American architect Henry N. Cobb, a partner in the firm Pei Cobb Freed, and built by OHL. In 2009, it became the new home of the British Embassy in Madrid. In 2010, the Embassy of Canada too moved to Torre Espacio. The Australian and Dutch Embassy are also located in the building.

Since 2015, it has been owned by Grupo Emperador S.A.U, owned by Filipino entrepreneur Andrew Tan. Six years after the acquisition by the Filipino-Spanish company, the skyscraper got its name changed to Torre Emperador (or Torre Emperador Castellana), named after the popular Filipino brand Emperador Brandy, as they announced in a Facebook post.

== Ownership ==
In June 2015, Juan Miguel Villar Mir, president of the Villar Mir Group and OHL, put Torre Espacio up for sale for €500 million. In the first phase, the sale process for the tower, located north of the Paseo de la Castellana in Madrid, attracted interest from the March family and Inditex founder Amancio Ortega through his investment vehicle Pontegadea. From October 2015, having rejected previous offers, he put his iconic skyscraper on the Paseo de la Castellana back on the market, raising the asking price to €600 million. Part of the funds received from the sale of Torre Espacio will be used to build a new skyscraper north of the Paseo de la Castellana, called Caleido. Finally, in November 2015, the skyscraper was acquired by the Philippine group Emperador for 558 million euros. At the end of 2022, Andrew Tan, founder of Emperador Properties, took his Spanish REIT public to "grow the real estate company with new assets and add new shareholders," also owning Diagonal Zero Zero.

The tower houses Spanish and international companies from all sectors, including the construction company OHLA, the Seville-based firm Ayesa, and the real estate group Emperador Properties, which owns the building. As of July 2023, the tower is currently 82% occupied. The tower has a gym and two restaurants, one on the 2nd floor and another on the 33rd floor, and a chapel on the 33rd floor.

== See also ==
- List of tallest buildings in Madrid
- Cuatro Torres Business Area
- Embassy of the United Kingdom, Madrid

Records
Preceded by Gran Hotel Bali	Tallest building in Spain; 2007–2008; 230 metres (750 ft)	Succeeded by Torre de Cristal
