= John West Giles =

19th-century British painter, engraver and lithographer

John West Giles (fl. 1830 – 1865) was a British painter, engraver and lithographer with works covering subjects such as sporting, animal, landscapes topographical views and military costumes, either made after his owns works or those of contemporary artists. He may have been the brother of Scottish painter James William Giles, as both artists shared the same address in Aberdeen in 1830, from which they sent works for exhibition at the Royal Academy. From 1844, Giles exhibited from London addresses.

J. W. Giles exhibited at the Royal Academy between 1830 and 1848, as well as exhibiting five works at the British Institution.

== Works ==
He is known for his lithographs of fox hunting subjects after John Herring. He also collaborated with Richard Barrett Davis, animal painter to George IV; and later to William IV and Queen Victoria, in a series of hand-coloured lithographic prints depicting different hunts, published under the title 'The Hunter's Annual' in four sets of four plates, in 1836, 1838, 1839 and 1841, to form a series of 16 prints, issued by the print publisher A. H. Bailey & Co.

His lithographs appear in a contemporary publication on the First Carlist War (1833–1840), Civil war in Spain. Characteristic sketches of the different troops, regular and irregular, native and foreign, composing the armies of don Carlos and Queen Isabella, also various scenes of military operations, and costumes of the Spanish peasantry, by Major C. V. Z., published in London by J. Dickinson (1837), based on contemporary sketches by Charles Van Zeller, a British soldier serving with the Carlist Army.

In the 1840s he also made some engravings after paintings by George French Angas, the English explorer, naturalist, painter and poet who emigrated to Australia. The collection was published in London as Typical portraits of the New Zealanders (1847).
