= Richard Clinton (politician) =

American politician

Richard Clinton (1720–January 22, 1795) was an officer in the Continental Army during the American Revolution, a member of the North Carolina General Assembly, a Register of Deeds for Duplin County and a prominent citizen of Sampson County.

== Early life and career ==
Richard Clinton is thought to be the step-son of Lieutenant General John Sampson (a member of the council for Josiah Martin) who it is thought to have moved to the Wilmington, North Carolina area around 1736. Lieutenant General John Sampson may have married Clinton's mother sometime after 1741 when Clinton was born, but there are no historical records to indicate this. It is more likely that Richard is either the son of John Clinton and Elisobeth (1733) or of Thomas Clinton and Elinor (1720). Around 1762, Clinton's step-father John Sampson built a home on a plantation he purchased near the present day town of Clinton, North Carolina. At this point in history, this area was still a part of Duplin County; however residents had to go many miles east to the nearest courthouse. After the family's move into Duplin County, Richard Clinton became the Register of Deeds for the county from 1773-1883.

Richard Clinton represented Duplin County in the Third North Carolina Provincial Congress in 1775.

After the establishment of the Independent State Government of North Carolina by the Halifax Constitution in 1776, Richard Clinton became one of the earliest members of the North Carolina House of Commons. It was during his tenure in the House of Commons that Clinton was able to secure the passage of a bill that created Sampson County from the western portion of Duplin County. Richard Clinton proposed the name of "Sampson" for the new county in honor of his step-father. In 1784, this new act was passed by the House of Commons and the first courts were ordered to take place at the home of James Myland just west of the current town of Clinton, North Carolina.

== Revolutionary War Service and actions ==
Just before the start of the Revolutionary War, Clinton's step-father John Sampson was a Lieutenant General in the Provincial North Carolina Army for Governor William Tryon in support of King George III. A few short years later however in 1777, the Oath of Allegiance and Abjuration was passed by the House of Commons that required all state and some county Government officials to sign swearing their oath to support the newly independent State of North Carolina. Richard Clinton did indeed sign this oath; however his step-father John Sampson did not, indicating that there may have been a conflict of interest of who the family would support: the British Crown, or the newly independent state.

Richard Clinton was called upon by Duplin County to raise a militia of men and was commissioned a Captain at first, then later a Colonel in the Continental Army in order to serve in support of the American forces. From 1776 to 1781, all was generally quite within the county, and the militia's primary job was to put down any insurrection among the local Tory population; a task he accomplished with his brother-in-law Colonel Kenan. After Lord Cornwallis marched his troops through the county in April 1781, much of the population was pestered by an emblazoned Tory population. Colonels Clinton and Kenan, marched their troops directly up to the forces of Lord Cornwallis in small guerrilla styled surprise attacks that left many British Soldiers and prisoners taken by the Colonels dead. This "crackdown" on the insurrection of the tories proved to be the pivotal event that prevented any further violence in the county.

== Establishment of the Town of Clinton ==
Upon the creation of the new Sampson County, 5 acres of land was purchase by the county from Richard Clinton on which one acre was to be for the construction of the new Courthouse, and the other five acres to be sold as lots to pay for the construction of the new courthouse. This area came to be known as Clinton Courthouse on maps as early as 1790, and was to become the center of the future town of Clinton, North Carolina which was chartered in 1822.

== Legacy ==
Richard Clinton died January 22, 1795, in what appears to have been a sudden and untimely death as he left no recorded will. His wife went on to use their home as a public ordinary for use by the various people coming and going from the county courthouse. Clinton had many children, all of whom became pillars in their respective communities. Many of his sons served as officers in the War of 1812, and went on to other parts of North Carolina and the Southern United States to lead in their respective local governments. The town of Clinton, North Carolina was named in honor of this patriot of the county.
