= Spanish Alarm =

18th-century Spanish attacks in North America

The Spanish Alarm was a period from 1739 to 1748 in North America during the War of Jenkins' Ear between Britain and Spain. During this period, the Spanish Crown directed colonial forces to attack port towns in the British colonies of North Carolina, South Carolina and Georgia. Due to an inability to garrison these colonies with an adequate military presence, the British Crown encouraged them to raise militia to defend themselves against Spanish attacks.

== Background ==
Following the War of Spanish Succession, Britain and Spain found themselves in a struggle for the balance of power which spilled over into their colonies in the Americas. Tensions occurred between Britain and Spain over a number of issues, including British colonists harvesting lumber on the Mosquito Coast (in violation of prior Anglo-Spanish treaties), Spanish coast guard vessels using harsh methods to inspect British merchantmen in Spanish waters, and British merchants smuggling contraband into Spanish colonies, ensuring that "Hostilities between the rival settlements in Georgia and Florida were inevitable".

== The Spanish Alarm ==
The British colonies of South Carolina and Georgia, after sending petitions (including some drafted by founder of Georgia James Oglethorpe and the Georgia Trustees) to the British Crown, received military support from the British Army. However, the British Crown's comparative neglect of the Southern Colonies and long deliberation over the decision distressed the Georgia Trustees. In February 1737, Sir Robert Walpole wrote to Oglethorpe:

that he could form about 300 men capable of bearing arms in Georgia, that South Carolina had money but no men, that North Carolina had men but no money; that Pennsylvania had both, and Virginia only money. That New England had men but no money, and New York had money and few men.

The same year, the Royal Navy and British Army began to be dispatched to South Carolina and Georgia. Upon the outbreak of the War of Jenkins' Ear, the British colony of North Carolina raised four companies of one hundred soldiers each to join other colonial troops in the unsuccessful British siege of Cartagena de Indies in 1741. In addition, the British colonies raised local militia units to defend their coastal towns and ports from Spanish raids. Spanish attacks along the eastern seaboard were intended to disrupt shipping and raid port towns. These raids were continuous from 1741 to 1748 - the Spanish attacked Beaufort Town and Brunswick Town in 1747.

In 1739, news had spread among the Thirteen Colonies that war had broken out between the British and the Spanish, and Carolinian colonists met the news with satisfaction. The mercantile community in the colony looked forward to an opportunity to curtail Spanish influence.

The time had arrived, South Carolinians believed, to remove once and for all a galling Spanish influence which had incited rebellion among slaves, to establish firm provincial boundaries and secure the Indian trade by pushing back the frontier with Spanish Florida, and to realize profits from afar which had objectives as much commercial as political.

When the war had finally ended, however, South Carolinians were relieved; the war had not brought in much of the way of benefits. "No sooner had the war begun than did Charleston merchants begin to consider methods by which they could gain from it". The Carolinian and Georgian colonists hoped to benefit from the Spanish Alarm, but as the raids continued, merchants in the Southern Colonies realized their negative effects. Many colonists started to lose their enthusiasm, especially during the 1740s. The court, "during nine years of actual warfare, recorded only twenty-one enemy ships which were captured by Charleston privateers and condemned as prizes of war". The book Georgia Journeys stated that "the Spanish Alarm...was of great damage to the colony in regarding cultivation".

== Aftermath ==
The two nations settled some of their differences in the Treaty of Aix-la-Chapelle in 1748. This effectively halted the Spanish raids into British American colonies.

== Sources ==
- Finding Aid of the Spanish Invasion Collection, 1742 - 1748, North Carolina Department of Natural and Cultural Resources
- The Colonial and State Records of North Carolina, Volume XXII, via University of North Carolina
- P. M. Handover, The Second Cecil: The Rise to Power, 1563-1604 of Sir Robert Cecil, Late First Earl of Salisbury (1959). London: Eyre & Spottiswoode, p. 159.
- William S. Powell and Michael Hill, The North Carolina Gazetteer: A Dictionary of Tar Heel Places and Their History, 2nd edition (2010). Chapel Hill, NC: University of North Carolina Press.
- Trevor R. Reese, "Britain's Military Support of Georgia in the War of 1739-1748," The Georgia Historical Quarterly, Vol. 43, No. 1 (March, 1959), pp. 1–10.
- Stuart O. Stumph, "Implications of King George's War for the Charleston Mercantile Community," The South Carolina Historical Magazine, Vol. 77, No. 3 (Jul., 1976), pp. 161–188.
- Carl E. Swanson, "American Privateering and Imperial Warfare, 1739-1748," The William and Mary Quarterly, Third Series, Vol. 42, No. 3 (Jul., 1985), pp. 357–382.
