= 1959 Birthday Honours =

British government recognitions

The Queen's Birthday Honours 1959 were appointments in many of the Commonwealth realms of Queen Elizabeth II to various orders and honours to reward and highlight good works by citizens of those countries.

The appointments were made to celebrate the official birthday of The Queen, and were announced on 13 June 1959 for the United Kingdom and Commonwealth Australia, New Zealand, Ghana, and the Federation of Rhodesia and Nyasaland.

The recipients of honours are displayed here as they were styled before their new honour, and arranged by honour, with classes (Knight, Knight Grand Cross, etc.) and then divisions (Military, Civil, etc.) as appropriate.

== United Kingdom and Commonwealth ==
=== Baron ===
- Major The Right Honourable Sir Thomas Lionel Dugdale, Bt., TD, MP, Member of Parliament for the Richmond Division of the North Riding of Yorkshire since 1929. A Lord Commissioner of the Treasury, 1937–1940 and 1941–1942; Deputy Chief Government Whip, 1941–1942. Minister of Agriculture and Fisheries, 1951–1954. Chairman, Conservative and Unionist Party Organisation, 1942–1944. For political and public services.
- Sir John Forster, KBE, QC, President of the Industrial Court since 1946.
- The Right Honourable Sir (William) Patrick Spens, KBE, QC, MP, Member of Parliament for Ashford, 1933–1943; and for South Kensington since 1950. Chief Justice of India, 1943–1947. For political and public services.

=== Privy Counsellor ===
- The Honourable Sir (George) Malcolm Hilbery, Judge of the High Court of Justice, Queen's Bench Division.
- The Right Honourable Michael John, Earl St. Aldwyn, TD, DL, Parliamentary Secretary, Ministry of Agriculture, Fisheries and Food, 1954–1958. Captain of the Gentlemen-at-Arms and Government Chief Whip in the House of Lords since 1958.
- Sir Gordon Cosmo Touche, MP, Member of Parliament for Reigate, 1931–1950; and for Dorking since 1950. Deputy Chairman of Ways and Means since 1956.

=== Baronet ===
- Major Sir (Arthur) Harold Bibby, DSO, DL. For political services in Liverpool and Cheshire.
- Hendrie Dudley Oakshott, MBE, MP, Member of Parliament for Bebington since 1950. An Assistant Government Whip, 1951–1952; a Lord Commissioner of the Treasury, 1952–1955. Comptroller of HM Household, 1955–1957. Treasurer of HM Household, 1957–1959.
- Robert Platt, MD, President, Royal College of Physicians; Professor of Medicine, Manchester University.

=== Knight Bachelor ===
- Dugald Baird, MD, FRCOG, Regius Professor of Midwifery and Gynaecology, University of Aberdeen.
- William Smith Duthie, OBE, MP, Member of Parliament for Banffshire since 1945. For political and public services.
- Leslie Carr Gamage, MC, Chairman and Managing Director, General Electric Co. Ltd.
- Harold Riley Grime. For political and public services in Lancashire.
- William Vallance Douglas Hodge, Lowndean Professor of Astronomy and Geometry, University of Cambridge. Master of Pembroke College.
- David John James. For charitable services in Wales.
- Arthur Maynard Chesterfield Jenour, TD, JP. For political and public services in Monmouthshire.
- Aubrey Julian Lewis, MD, FRCP, Professor of Psychiatry, University of London.
- Major William Cecil McKee, ERD, JP, Lord Mayor of Belfast.
- John Cecil Masterman, OBE, Provost, Worcester College, Oxford.
- Brigadier George David Keith Murray, OBE, MC, TD, JP, DL, Chairman, Northern Agricultural Executive Committee, Scotland.
- Brigadier Otho Leslie Prior-Palmer, DSO, MP, Member of Parliament for Worthing since 1945. For political and public services.
- James Reginald Pearson, OBE, Deputy Chairman, Vauxhall Motors Ltd.
- Captain Francis Richard Jonathan Peel, CBE, MC, Chief Constable, Essex County Constabulary.
- Leslie Ernest Peppiatt, MC. President of the Law Society.
- Captain Walter Michael Hungerford Pollen, MC. For political and public services in Gloucestershire.
- George Pollock, QC, Director, British Employers' Confederation.
- Kenneth Huson Preston, Chairman, Stone-Platt Industries Ltd.
- His Honour Judge John Alun Pugh, Judge of County Courts.
- Major Charles Evelyn Pym, CBE. DL. For public services in Kent.
- Michael Scudamore Redgrave, CBE, Actor.
- Robert Desmond Ropner, Chairman, General Council of British Shipping.
- Alderman Edward Percy Rugg. For political and public services.
- William Proctor Smith, JP. For political and public services in Cheshire.
- Stanley Spencer, CBE, Painter.
- Ronald Syme, Camden Professor of Ancient History, University of Oxford.
- Captain Thomas Antonio Reginald Terrell. For political services.
- William Giles Newsom Walker, TD, DL, Chairman and Joint Managing Director, Jute Industries Ltd.
- Mortimer Langton Warren, Secretary, Church Commissioners.
- William Wilkinson Wood. For political and public services in Sheffield.

State of Queensland

- Herbert Leon Trout, of Everton Park, State of Queensland. For public services.

State of South Australia

- Sidney Barton Pope, of the State of South Australia. For services to public and charitable organisations.

State of Victoria

- Edgar Barton Coles. For public and philanthropic services in the State of Victoria.
- Frederick William Thomas, Lord Mayor of the City of Melbourne, State of Victoria.

Overseas Territories

- Vahe Robert Bairamian, Chief Justice, Sierra Leone.
- Arthur John Grattan-Bellew, CMG, QC, Chief Secretary, Tanganyika.
- Gaston Johnston, QC, President of the Bar Association of Trinidad and Tobago, and of the Federated Bar Associations of The West Indies.
- Colin Malcolm MacGregor, Chief Justice, Jamaica.
- John Andrew Mahoney, OBE, JP, Speaker of the Legislative Council, Gambia.
- George Mutlow Paterson, OBE, Chief Justice, Northern Rhodesia.
- John Kingsmill Robert Thorp, CMG, MBE, Governor and Commander-in-Chief, Seychelles.

=== Order of the Bath ===
==== Knight Grand Cross of the Order of the Bath (GCB) ====
Military Division

- Admiral Sir William Wellclose Davis, KCB, DSO.
- General Sir Hugh Charles Stockwell, KCB, KBE, DSO, ADC (General), (23894), late Infantry. Colonel, The Royal Welch Fusiliers; Colonel Commandant, Army Air Corps; Colonel, The Royal Malay Regiment.
- Air Chief Marshal Sir Claude Bernard Raymond Pelly, KCB, CBE, MC, ADC, Royal Air Force.

==== Knight Commander of the Order of the Bath (KCB) ====
Military Division

Royal Navy

- Vice-Admiral Norman Eric Dalton, CB, OBE.
- Vice-Admiral Harry Philpot Koelle, CB.

Army

- Lieutenant-General Sir Roger Herbert Bower, KBE, CB, (24360), late Infantry.
- Lieutenant-General Joseph Howard Nigel Poett, CB, DSO, (38346), late Infantry. Colonel, The Durham Light Infantry.

Royal Air Force

- Acting Air Marshal Walter Graemes Cheshire, CB, CBE.
- Acting Air Marshal Kenneth Brian Boyd Cross, CB, CBE, DSO, DFC.

Civil Division

- Victor Martin Reeves Goodman, CB, OBE, MC, Clerk of the Parliaments.
- William Strath, CB, Permanent Secretary, Ministry of Supply.
- Alfred John Digby Winnifrith, CB, Permanent Secretary, Ministry of Agriculture, Fisheries and Food.

==== Companion of the Order of the Bath (CB) ====
Military Division

Royal Navy

- Rear-Admiral Christopher Douglas Bonham-Carter.
- Rear-Admiral Noel Edward Harwood Clarke.
- Rear-Admiral Gilbert Carey De Jersey.
- Rear-Admiral Robert Alastair Ewing, DSC.
- Rear-Admiral Walter Evershed, DSO.
- Rear-Admiral Nigel Stuart Henderson, OBE.
- Rear-Admiral Jack Kenneth Highton, CBE.
- Rear-Admiral Henry Cuthbert Norris Rolfe.
- Rear-Admiral Alec Julian Tyndale-Biscoe, OBE.
- Rear-Admiral John Harold Unwin, DSC.

Army

- Major-General Kenneth Cecil Orville Bastyan, CBE, (34563), late Royal Corps of Signals.
- Major-General Hugh Alastair Borradaile, DSO, (35959), late Infantry.
- Major-General Philip John Lauriston Capon, QHP, MRCS, LRCP, DPH, (39084), late Royal Army Medical Corps.
- Major-General Alexander Frederic Joseph Elmslie, CBE, (31922), late Royal Army Service Corps.
- Major-General Richard Elton Goodwin, CBE, DSO, (40616), late Infantry.
- Major-General Gerald Kellett, CBE, (33351), late Royal Regiment of Artillery.
- Major-General Richard Eyre Lloyd, CBE, DSO, (37083), late Corps of Royal Engineers.
- Major-General John Frederick Matheson Macdonald, DSO, OBE, (38523), late Infantry.
- Major-General Geoffrey Randolph Dixon Musson, CBE, DSO, (45438), late Infantry.
- Major-General Graham Peddie, DSO, MBE, (34508), late Royal Regiment of Artillery.

Royal Air Force

- The Venerable Francis William Cocks, QHC.
- Air Vice-Marshal George Augustus Walker, CBE, DSO, DFC, AFC.
- Air Commodore Graham Clarke Bladon, CBE, (Retired).
- Air Commodore Howard Ford, CBE, AFC.
- Air Commodore Charles Edward Stuart Lockett, (Retired).
- Air Commodore Cyril John Salmon, OBE.
- Air Commodore John Edward Rudkin Sowman, CBE.
- Air Commodore Ronald Bain Thomson, DSO, DFC.
- Acting Air Commodore Patrick Geraint Jameson, DSO, DFC.
- Group Captain Andrew Henry Humphrey, OBE, DFC, AFC.

Civil Division

- Dermot Charles Hyatt Abbot, Under-secretary, Ministry of Pensions and National Insurance.
- Eric Bedford, CVO, Chief Architect, Ministry of Works.
- John Ernest Haldane Blackie, Chief Inspector, Ministry of Education.
- John Edward Hampson, Deputy Secretary, Ministry of Transport and Civil Aviation.
- Jack Alexander Sutherland-Harris, Under-Secretary, Ministry of Agriculture, Fisheries and Food.
- Ralph Henderson, OBE, Director of Stores, Admiralty.
- Colonel Tom Fielden Hood, OBE, TD, DL, Chairman, Territorial and Auxiliary Forces Association, County of Gloucester.
- Gerald Ewart Johnstone, Principal Assistant Solicitor, Office of HM Procurator-General and Treasury Solicitor.
- Thomas Doyle Kingdom, Under-Secretary, National Assistance Board.
- Colonel Charles Norman Littleboy, DSO, MC, TD, DL, Chairman of Yorkshire (North Riding) Territorial and Auxiliary Forces Association.
- Alexander James Nicol Miller, Secretary, Board of Inland Revenue.
- John Bennet Lorimer Munro, CMG, Under-Secretary, Board of Trade.
- Kenneth Alfred Lamport Parker, Assistant Under-Secretary of State, Home Office.
- Reginald Ratcliffe, MBE, Deputy Controller of Royal Ordnance Factories, Ministry of Supply.
- Harold Ford Rossetti, Under-Secretary, Ministry of Labour and National Service.

=== Order of Saint Michael and Saint George ===
==== Knight Grand Cross of the Order of St Michael and St George (GCMG) ====
- Sir Arthur Edward Trevor Benson, KCMG, lately Governor, Northern Rhodesia.

==== Knight Commander of the Order of St Michael and St George (KCMG) ====
- Commander The Right Honourable Allan Herbert Percy Noble, DSO, DSC, Royal Navy (Retired), MP, Member of Parliament for Chelsea since 1945. Parliamentary and Financial Secretary to the Admiralty, 1951–1955. Parliamentary Under-Secretary of State for Commonwealth Relations, 1955–1956. Minister of State for Foreign Affairs, 1956–1959.
- The Most Reverend James Duhig, CMG, Roman Catholic Archbishop of Brisbane, State of Queensland.
- Alexander Francis Morley, CMG, CBE, High Commissioner for the United Kingdom in Ceylon.
- Vice-Admiral Sir Peveril Barton Reiby Wallop William-Powlett, KCB, CBE, DSO, Governor of Southern Rhodesia.
- The Honourable Albert Asher Wolff, Chief Justice of the State of Western Australia.
- Edwin Porter Arrowsmith, CMG, Governor and Commander-in-Chief, Falkland Islands.
- Lieutenant-General Sir John Dane Woodall, KBE, CB, MC, Governor and Commander-in-Chief, Bermuda.
- Douglas Laird Busk, CMG, Her Majesty's Ambassador Extraordinary and Plenipotentiary in Helsinki.
- George Lisle Clutton, CMG, lately Her Majesty's Ambassador Extraordinary and Plenipotentiary in Manila.
- John Walker, CMG, OBE, Her Majesty's Ambassador Extraordinary and Plenipotentiary in Caracas.

==== Companion of the Order of St Michael and St George (CMG) ====
- Frank Edward Figgures, Under-Secretary, HM Treasury.
- Thomas Stephen Leach, MC, Chief Inspector of Fisheries, Ministry of Agriculture, Fisheries and Food.
- James Scrimgeour, OBE, Senior Partner, J. & A. Scrimgeour. For services to the Crown Agents for Oversea Governments and Administrations.
- William Henry Wheeler, lately Head of United Kingdom Ministry of Supply Staff, Melbourne, Australia. (Now Director of Explosives, Research Establishment, Ministry of Supply).
- Aubrey William Burleton Coady, Under-Secretary and Comptroller of Accounts, Treasury, State of New South Wales.
- David Wathen Stather Hunt, OBE, an Assistant Secretary in the Commonwealth Relations Office.
- David John Muir, Agent-General in London for the State of Queensland.
- Alfred Moxon Simpson, a prominent member of the commercial community in the State of South Australia.
- Henry Josiah Lightfoot Boston, Speaker of the House of Representatives, Sierra Leone.
- Hugh Percival Elliott, Permanent Secretary, Eastern Region, Nigeria.
- Francis William Essex, Financial Secretary, British Guiana.
- John Edward Seaton Griffiths, MBE, Senior Provincial Commissioner, Tanganyika.
- Alexander John Haddow, DSc, MB, ChB, Director, East African Virus Research Institute, East Africa High Commission.
- John Edward Beauchamp Hall, Permanent Secretary, Ministry of Commerce and Industry, Federation of Nigeria.
- John George Maydon King, OBE, Director of Agriculture, Uganda.
- Hedley Herbert Marshall, QC, Attorney-General, Northern Region, Nigeria.
- John Perry Moffett, lately Commissioner for Social Development, Tanganyika.
- Thomas Arthur Manly Nash, OBE, Director, West African Institute for Trypanosomiasis Research, Federation of Nigeria.
- Charles Robert Harley Nott, OBE, Secretary for Fijian Affairs, Fiji.
- Egerton Rudolph Richardson, Financial Secretary, Jamaica.
- Roger John Massy Swynnerton, OBE, MC, Director of Agriculture, Kenya.
- Michael Hugh Varvill, Permanent Secretary, Ministry of Transport, Federation of Nigeria.
- Robert Everard Wainwright, Provincial Commissioner, Rift Valley Province, Kenya.
- Kenneth Maurice Walmsley, OBE, Colonial Secretary, Bahamas.
- Dennis Charles White, British Resident, Brunei.
- Philip George Doyne Adams, Regional Information Officer, Her Majesty's Embassy, Beirut.
- Francis David Wynyard Brown, Foreign Office.
- Robert Cecil, Counsellor, Her Majesty's Embassy, Bonn.
- Guy Hamilton Clarke, Her Majesty's Ambassador Extraordinary and Plenipotentiary in Monrovia and Conakry.
- William Vincent John Evans, MBE, Legal Counsellor, United Kingdom Mission to the United Nations, New York.
- Peter Murray, Counsellor, Her Majesty's Embassy, Rangoon.
- John Gower Meredith Richards, Counsellor, United Kingdom Delegation to the Organisation for European Economic Co-operation, Paris.
- John Christopher Blake Richmond, lately Foreign Office.
- Adrian Christopher Ian Samuel, Foreign Office.

=== Royal Victorian Order ===
==== Knight Commander of the Royal Victorian Order (KCVO) ====
- Brigadier Ivan de la Bere, CB, CVO, CBE.
- The Honourable David Bowes-Lyon, DL, JP.
- Sir Archibald Montague Henry Gray, CBE, TD, MD, FRCP.
- Wilfrid Percy Henry Sheldon, CVO, MD, FRCP.

==== Commander of the Royal Victorian Order (CVO) ====
- The Honourable Henry Arthur Alers Hankey.
- Lieutenant-Colonel John Mandeville Hugo, OBE.
- Richard William Legerton May, MB, BCh.
- Dorothy Emily Meynell, MVO.

==== Member of the Royal Victorian Order (MVO) ====
At this time the two lowest classes of the Royal Victorian Order were "Member (fourth class)" and "Member (fifth class)", both with post-nominal letters MVO. "Member (fourth class)" was renamed "Lieutenant" (LVO) from the 1985 New Year Honours onwards.

Fourth Class

- Godfrey Fraser Carey, MB, BCh.
- Arthur Cooper.
- Surgeon Commander Alan Peter Mayberry Nicol, MVO, MRCP, MRCS, Royal Navy.
- Lieutenant-Colonel Sam Rhodes, MBE, Scots Guards.
- Wing Commander Duncan Frank Hyland-Smith, DFC, AFC, Royal Air Force.
- Francis John Bagot Watson.

Fifth Class

- Thomas Charteris Barbour.
- Jacqueline Lily Clark.
- Thomas Hope Findlay.
- Charles Albert Linge.
- Flight Lieutenant William George McCready, Royal Air Force.
- Catherine Peebles.
- Frederick Thomas Turk.
- Major Leslie Horace Ayliff White.

=== Order of the British Empire ===
==== Knight Grand Cross of the Order of the British Empire (GBE) ====
Civil Division

- Sir William Palmer, KBE, CB. For services to industry and commerce. Chairman, European Free Trade Committee. Chairman, British Man-Made Fibres Federation.

==== Dame Commander of the Order of the British Empire (DBE) ====
Military Division

- Brigadier Mary Katherine Rosamund Colvin, OBE, TD, ADC (Honorary), (192684), Women's Royal Army Corps.

Civil Division

- The Right Honourable Cynthia Mary, Viscountess Brookeborough. For public services in Northern Ireland.

==== Knight Commander of the Order of the British Empire (KBE) ====
Military Division

Royal Navy

- Vice-Admiral John Gilchrist Thesiger Inglis, CB, OBE.
- Vice-Admiral Geoffrey Thisleton-Smith, CB, GM.
- Rear-Admiral Anthony Cecil Capel Miers, VC, CB, DSO.

Royal Air Force

- Air Vice-Marshal Leslie Dalton-Morris, CB, CBE.
- Air Vice-Marshal Francis Wilfrid Peter Dixon, CBE, MB, BS, QHS.

Civil Division

- John Anderson, CB, Secretary, Department of Health for Scotland.
- Hubert Ashton, MC, DL, MP, Member of Parliament for the Chelmsford Division of Essex since 1950. Second Church Estates Commissioner since 1957. For political and public services.
- Professor Sir David Brunt. For services in the organisation of the International Geophysical Year.
- Sir Alec Martin, Honorary Secretary, National Art Collections Fund. Chairman of the Trustees, Wallace Collection.
- Commander Geoffrey Henry Hughes-Onslow, DSC, Royal Navy (Retired), HM Lieutenant of the County of Ayr. For public services.
- Alexander Brackenridge, CBE, MC, British subject resident in the United States of America.
- James Thyne Henderson, CMG, Her Majesty's Ambassador Extraordinary and Plenipotentiary in La Paz.
- Ernest Albert Vasey, CMG, Minister for Finance and Development, Kenya.

Honorary Knight Commander

- Sheikh Mbarak Ali Hinawy, OBE, Liwali for the Coast and Personal Adviser to the Governor, Kenya, on Arab Affairs.

==== Commander of the Order of the British Empire (CBE) ====
Military Division

Royal Navy

- Commodore Barry John Anderson.
- Captain Rodney Harold Power Carver, DSC, (lately on loan to the Government of India).
- Captain Dudley Frederick Hingley Chandler, OBE, DSC.
- Captain Edward Gregson Roper, DSO, DSC.
- Captain Arthur Geoffrey Sowman.

Army

- Colonel Timothy Michael Richard Ahern, OBE, MB, (52443), late Royal Army Medical Corps.
- Brigadier Percy Geoffrey Bamford, DSO, OBE, (37159), late Infantry.
- Brigadier Geoffrey Herbert Tulloch Billson, DSO, OBE, (38384), late Royal Regiment of Artillery (now R.A.R.O.).
- Brigadier Adam Johnstone Cheyne Block, DSO, OBE, (39141), late Royal Regiment of Artillery.
- Brigadier Bertram Edward Lionell Burton, (33625), late Infantry, (now R.A.R.O.).
- Brigadier Samuel Rendall Walmer Clarke, (47694), Corps of Royal Electrical and Mechanical Engineers.
- Brigadier (temporary) Gilbert John Folkard, (30852), late Royal Army Educational Corps.
- Brigadier James Freeman Godwin, OBE, (36650), late Corps of Royal Engineers.
- Brigadier Henry Martin Gough, (36657), late Royal Army Service Corps.
- The Reverend Charles George Gregory, Chaplain to the Forces, First Class, (56216), Royal Army Chaplains' Department.
- Brigadier Derek Ernest Holbrook, OBE, (47558), late Corps of Royal Engineers.
- Brigadier (temporary) Derek Wooldridge Lister, DSO, MC, (124578), late Infantry.
- Colonel (acting) Leonard Gerard Muller, TD, (7650), Army Cadet Force.
- Brigadier Frederick Warren Blakeway Parry, ADC, (34866), late Infantry.
- Brigadier Frederick Stephens, DSO, ADC, (33782), late Infantry.
- Brigadier (temporary) Victor Francis Dawson Tarrant, (40723), Royal Army Ordnance Corps.

Royal Air Force

- Air Commodore James Stewart Wilson, MB, ChB.
- Group Captain Leonard Edmund Botting, DFC.
- Group Captain Reginald John Clare-Hunt, (Retired).
- The Reverend Thomas Hankin.
- Group Captain Idris George Selvin Hemming, OBE.
- Group Captain Edgar Knowles, MBE, ADC.
- Group Captain Arthur Ernest Lowe, MBE, DFC.
- Group Captain David Lumgair.
- Group Captain Stanley Edwin Druce Mills.
- Group Captain Spencer Leonard Ring, DFC.
- Group Captain Ernest William Tacon, DSO, MVO, DFC, AFC.

Civil Division

- Francis John Armstrong, MBE, HM Inspector of Constabulary, Home Office.
- Reginald Graham Atkinson, Assistant Comptroller, Patent Office, Board of Trade.
- Charles Frederick Rex Bagnall. For political services.
- John Richard Baker, Assistant Secretary, Ministry of Power.
- Alderman Ernest Ball, JP, Leader, Wigan County Borough Council.
- Alice Margaret Battensby, Headmistress, Cambridgeshire High School for Girls.
- David Kighley Baxandall, Director, National Galleries of Scotland.
- Reginald William Frederick Thomas Berkeley, Director and General Manager, Belfast Steamship Co. Ltd.
- Professor William John Granville Beynon. For services in the organisation of the International Geophysical Year.
- Frederick Herbert Stanley Brown, Member, Central Electricity Generating Board.
- Alderman Sydney Morris Caffyn, For services to industrial relations.
- William Campbell, General Secretary, Educational Institute of Scotland.
- George Reader Chappel, Chief Superintendent Engineer, Furness, Withy & Co. Ltd.
- William Edward China, Keeper of Entomology, British Museum (Natural History).
- Eric Edmund Raitt Church, OBE, Controller, Establishments Division, British Council.
- Brigadier Raleigh Charles Chichester-Constable, DSO, lately Chairman, Yorkshire, East Riding, Agricultural Executive Committee.
- Maclachlan Alan Carl Silverwood-Cope, Principal Executive Officer, Foreign Office.
- Wilfred Frank Crick, General Manager for Research and Statistics, Midland Bank Ltd.
- Maurice Crump, Deputy Director, Department of the Director of Public Prosecutions.
- Bernard William Alfred Crutchlow, HM Deputy Chief Inspector of Factories, Ministry of Labour and National Service.
- Professor Sydney John Davies, Dean, Royal Military College of Science.
- Frederick Richard Dimbleby, OBE, Broadcaster.
- George Beedie Esslemont, JP, City Chamberlain, Glasgow.
- Geraint Llewelyn Evans, Opera Singer.
- William Norman Ewer, Diplomatic Correspondent of the Daily Herald.
- Group Captain George Rowland Scott-Farnie, Managing Director, International Aeradio Ltd.
- William Fisk, OBE, Representative of the South Eastern Region, National Savings Committee.
- Athelstan Norman Gardiner, Deputy Chief Engineer, Ministry of Housing and Local Government.
- William Gilbert, TD, Assistant Secretary, Board of Trade.
- Alderman Gerald Stanley Glover, JP. For political and public services in Londonderry.
- John Herman Thorburn Goldsmith, Civil Service Commissioner and Chairman of the Civil Service Selection Board.
- Leslie Graham, JP, Chairman, Northern (Northumberland & Cumberland) Division, National Coal Board.
- Colonel Leonard Green, CB, MBE, MC, TD, DL, Chairman, Civil Defence Committee, Lancashire County Council.
- William Rede Hawthorne, Professor of Applied Thermodynamics, University of Cambridge.
- Colonel George William Richard Hearn, DL, Chief Constable, Staffordshire Constabulary.
- James Henderson. For political and public services in Scotland.
- John Henderson, MC, Chief Engineer, South of Scotland Electricity Board.
- John Gordon Henson, JP, Chairman, Lincolnshire (Kesteven), Agricultural Executive Committee.
- Thomas Clyde Hewlett. For political and public services in Manchester and Cheshire.
- Elfrida Lilian Gwendolen Hilton, MB, FRCS, Director, Radiotherapeutic Department, University College Hospital.
- Lieutenant-Colonel Gilbert Burdett Howcroft, MC, TD. For political and public services in Oldham.
- Major Joseph Charles Hunter, MC, Chairman, Leeds Regional Hospital Board.
- Colonel Herbert Cecil Joel, OBE, JP, DL. For political and public services in London.
- Ernest Alexander Francis Johnston, Director of Works, Ministry of Finance for Northern Ireland.
- Reginald Alexander Kidd, County Surveyor and County Director of Planning, Nottinghamshire.
- Charles Frederick Lawrence King, Chairman, Hire Purchase Information Ltd.
- Stephen James McAdden, MP, Member of Parliament for Southend East since 1950. For political and public services.
- Joseph Francis McGlennon, OBE, Assistant Secretary, Air Ministry.
- Alexander Robert Mathewson. For political services in Edinburgh.
- Alderman Charles Gordon Maynard, JP. For political and public services in Hertfordshire.
- Robert William Mclntosh Melvin, General Manager, Bristol Waterworks Company.
- Allan Cuthbertson Monkhouse, lately Deputy Director, Warren Spring Laboratory, Department of Scientific and Industrial Research.
- Woodford Alan Muddell, JP, Chairman, Trent River Board.
- William Ness, Assistant Secretary, Agricultural Research Council.
- Turlough Aubrey O'Brien, Public Relations Officer, General Post Office.
- Raymond Harry Oppenheimer. For services to amateur golf.
- Dorothy Weir Peile, JP. For political and public services in Northumberland.
- Edwin William Stanley Press, Director, Chemical Inspectorate, Ministry of Supply.
- Captain James Harrison Quick, OBE, Chief Nautical Surveyor, Ministry of Transport and Civil Aviation.
- Terence George Randall, OBE, Deputy Clerk, London County Council.
- Gilbert Stanley Nowell Richards. For political and public services in Coventry.
- Clifford William Rowell, lately Regional Land Commissioner, Ministry of Agriculture, Fisheries and Food.
- The Honourable Victor Alexander Frederick Villiers Russell, OBE, lately Counsel to the Treasury and the Board of Trade in the Probate Division of the High Court of Justice.
- Bertram Schofield, Keeper, Department of Manuscripts, British Museum.
- Athene Seyler, Actress.
- Albert George Thomas Shingler, Senior Principal Inspector of Taxes, Board of Inland Revenue.
- Marshall Arnott Sisson, Architect.
- George William Quick Smith, Member, Board of Management, British Road Services.
- James Andrew Buchan Smith, Director, Hannah Dairy Research Institute.
- Margaret Jane Smyth, OBE, Chairman, General Nursing Council for England and Wales.
- Brigadier James Newton Soden, District Director, Army Kinema Corporation, British Army of the Rhine.
- Major John Thomas Spinks, DL, lately National Chairman, British Legion.
- Magdalen Glass Stenhouse, MVO, OBE, Assistant Private Secretary to the Prime Minister.
- Henry Marshall Steven, Professor of Forestry, University of Aberdeen.
- Geoffrey Singleton Strode, OBE, MM, General Manager, Publications, British Broadcasting Corporation.
- Major Henry Sumner, Veterinary Surgeon. Past President, Royal College of Veterinary Surgeons.
- William Ellis Thirkettle, Principal, London School of Printing and Graphic Arts.
- Michael Kemp Tippett, Composer.
- Sylvia Vachell, OBE, Administrator for Wales, Women's Voluntary Services.
- Leonard Alfred Walden, Chairman and Managing Director, Walden & Son (Henley) Ltd.
- Marjory Winsome Warren, MRCS, LRCP, Consultant Physician, Geriatric Unit, West Middlesex Hospital, Isleworth.
- Robert Watts, MC, For services to the Incorporated Law Society of Northern Ireland.
- Edward Christian Wheeldon, Managing Director, Westland Aircraft Ltd.
- Alexander Hay White, Deputy Chairman and Managing Director, Lithgows Ltd.
- William Arthur Williams, MBE, Assistant Secretary (Finance Officer), Scottish Education Department.
- John Allan Willis, Assistant Secretary, Ministry of Health.
- Alderman Eric Franklin Winser, MC, DL, Chairman, Fire Brigade Committee, County Councils Association.
- William Wittet. For political and public services in Moray and Nairn.
- Leslie John Witts, MD, FRCP, Nuffield Professor of Clinical Medicine, University of Oxford.
- Mary Woodall, Director, Birmingham City Museum and Art Gallery.
- William Ambrose Wright, For services to Association Football.
- Reginald Stephens Beak, British subject resident in Argentina.
- Albert Edward Bennett, British subject lately resident in Indonesia.
- Frank Allan Grafton Cook, OBE, Her Majesty's Consul-General, Smyrna.
- Kevin Gerard Fenelon, lately-Statistical Expert to the Ministry of Economics, Baghdad.
- Ronald Chalmers Kelt, OBE, lately Inspector-General and Chief Engineer, Iraqi Ports Administration.
- Cecil Anthony Maxwell-Lefroy, General Manager, The Burmah Oil Co. (Burma Trading) Ltd., and Chairman of The Burma Oil Co. (1954) Ltd., Rangoon.
- Alan Trevor Oldham, Her Majesty's Consul-General, Dakar.
- Fulke Rosavo Radice, lately Vice-Director of the International Bureau of the Universal Postal Union.
- Richard Thistlethwaite, Counsellor, Office of the Commissioner-General for the United Kingdom in South-East Asia, Singapore.
- Hugh Gerner Brain, OBE. For public services in the State of Victoria.
- Francis Patrick Buckley, Agent-General in London for the State of New South Wales.
- John Burgess, Managing Director of the Malaya Borneo Building Society Limited.
- Philip Crawshaw, MBE, Director-General of the Over-Seas League.
- Patrick Daley, Senior, of Maleny, State of Queensland. For services to the dairying industry.
- Lindsay Alexander Dey, MB, ChM, a prominent physician, of Sydney, State of New South Wales.
- William Richards Feaver, a member of the United Kingdom business community In Accra, Ghana.
- Reginald Francis Graham Fogarty. For public and philanthropic services in the State of Victoria.
- Frank Clifton Green, MC, in recognition of his contribution to the collection and writing of the history of the State of Tasmania.
- Arthur Appleton Jackson, Chief Commissioner of the Boy Scouts Association in the State of Queensland.
- David Faed Macmillan. For services to the United Kingdom Government and to the United Kingdom community in India.
- Neal McCusker, Commissioner for Railways, State of New South Wales.
- Roger Edward Pitt, lately Director of Public Works, Federation of Malaya.
- Clemens Alexander Reiners, Commissioner of Land Tax, State of South Australia.
- Frederick Claude Rowan, a member of the United Kingdom community in Colombo, Ceylon.
- Basil Gordon Spurling, Commissioner, British South Africa Police, Southern Rhodesia.
- Thomas Wilson, MD, formerly Director of the Institute for Medical Research, Federation of Malaya.
- Norman Stanley Alexander, Professor of Physics, University College, Ibadan, Western Nigeria.
- Herbert Alexander Angus, MBE, Director of Commerce and Industry, Hong Kong.
- Lieutenant-Colonel Arthur Adolph Baerlein. For public services in Uganda.
- Geoffrey Pearl Boon. For public services in the Leeward Islands.
- Philip Cecil Chambers, Adviser on Agriculture, Northern Region, Nigeria.
- John Hume Chiswell Clarke, MB, ChB, Director of Medical Services, Cyprus.
- Reginald Walter Cook, OBE, Head of Shipping Department, Office of the Crown Agents for Oversea Governments and Administrations.
- William John Dupre Cooper, Director of Audit, Tanganyika.
- Colin Eric Duff, OBE, Chief Conservator of Forests, Northern Rhodesia.
- Walter Fletcher, JP. For public services in Jamaica.
- William Arthur Glynn, MRCS, LRCP, Director of Medical Services, Aden.
- William Harding, Judge in Her Majesty's Superior Courts, Malta.
- Charles William Stewart Hartley, Director, West African Institute for Oil Palm Research.
- John Angell Hartley, Director of Education, Aden.
- Helen May Johnstone. For cultural services in Trinidad.
- John Metcalfe Mason. For public services in Singapore.
- Aliyu Musdafa, Lamido of Adamawa, First Class Chief, Northern Region, Nigeria.
- Chandulal Kalidas Patel, MBE. For public services in Uganda.
- John Dudley Pollett, OBE, Director of Geological Survey, Sierra Leone.
- Andre Guy Sauzier, ED, Minister of Communications, Mauritius.
- Charles Edward Michael Terry, OBE. For public services in Hong Kong.
- William Millar Wedderspoon, Commissioner of Income Tax, East African Income Tax Department, East Africa High Commission.

==== Officer of the Order of the British Empire (OBE) ====
Military Division

Royal Navy

- Chief Officer Winifred Joan Denham, Women's Royal Naval Service.
- Lieutenant-Colonel Douglas Burns Drysdale, DSO, MBE, Royal Marines.
- Commander Charles Esmond Emerson, DSC.
- Commander Stuart Murray William Farquharson-Roberts, (lately on loan to the Government of Pakistan).
- Commander John Geoffrey Vesey Holt.
- Surgeon Commander Edward Boyd Martin, MRCS, LRCP.
- Commander John Ward Meadows, BEM.
- The Reverend Frank Lovell Pocock, Chaplain.
- Commander Eric Nelson Richardson.
- Commander John Peter Sandbrook.
- Lieutenant-Commander Frank Arthur Shaw, RD, Royal Naval Reserve (Retired), Captain, Royal Fleet Auxiliary Service.
- Commander Nicholas Withington Watts.
- Commander James Young, VRD, Royal Naval Reserve.

Army

- Lieutenant-Colonel Linda Elizabeth Baldwin, (211148), Women's Royal Army Corps.
- Lieutenant-Colonel John St. John Balguy, (9269), late The Sherwood Foresters (Nottinghamshire and Derbyshire Regiment), (Retired).
- Colonel (local) (now Lieutenant-Colonel) John Bruce Chaplin, DSO, (53626), Royal Regiment of Artillery.
- Lieutenant-Colonel Duncan Graeme Dickson, MC, TD, (67722), Mobile Defence Corps, Army Emergency Reserve (now R.A.R.O.).
- Lieutenant-Colonel Alexander Duncan, (69967), Royal Army Ordnance Corps.
- Lieutenant-Colonel Edwin Frederick Foxton, (72136), Royal Army Educational Corps.
- Lieutenant-Colonel Ian Gordon Gill, MBE, MC, (79107), 4th/7th Royal Dragoon Guards, Royal Armoured Corps.
- Lieutenant-Colonel (acting) Henry Grattan Halpin, TD, (87500), Combined Cadet Force.
- Lieutenant-Colonel (temporary) Michael Neale Harbottle, (73156), 1st Greenjackets, 43rd and 52nd.
- Major Frederick John Harris, MBE. ARCM, (221011), Grenadier Guards.
- Lieutenant-Colonel Frederick James Harrison, TD, (71696), The Gloucestershire Regiment, Territorial Army.
- Lieutenant-Colonel Donald Ogilvie Hogg, MC, TD, (65528), The King's Own Scottish Borderers, Territorial Army.
- Lieutenant-Colonel (temporary) Charles Holmes, (359213), Royal Army Pay Corps.
- Lieutenant-Colonel (now Colonel) Alexander Marshall Horace Gregory-Hood, MBE, MC, (66075), late Foot Guards.
- Lieutenant-Colonel Peter Hugh Hordern, DSO, MBE, (69189), Royal Tank Regiment, Royal Armoured Corps.
- Lieutenant-Colonel (acting) George Frederick Keast, TD, (171577), Combined Cadet Force.
- Lieutenant-Colonel Mortimer Francis Howlett Kelleher, MC, MB, MRCP(Edin.), (67854), Royal Army Medical Corps.
- Lieutenant-Colonel Peter James Kent, (62328), Corps of Royal Engineers.
- Lieutenant-Colonel Peter William Lonnon, MBE, (63046), Royal Corps of Signals.
- Lieutenant-Colonel Robert Ludovic Lyle, (363993), The Queen's Royal Surrey Regiment (Employed List (1)).
- Lieutenant-Colonel William George Lyon, (50832), Royal Regiment of Artillery.
- Lieutenant-Colonel Colin Stephen Mackenzie, (49897), The Royal Scots (The Royal Regiment) (Employed List (1)).
- Lieutenant-Colonel (temporary) David Edward Manning, (148153), Royal Regiment of Artillery (now R.A.R.O.).
- Brevet and Temporary Lieutenant-Colonel Philip Henry Muir, MBE, MC, (73025), Royal Regiment of Artillery.
- Lieutenant-Colonel John Erskine Nicholson, TD, (56257), The Sherwood Foresters (Nottinghamshire and Derbyshire Regiment), Territorial Army.
- Lieutenant-Colonel Richard Edward Owen, (220955), Corps of Royal Engineers, Territorial Army.
- Lieutenant-Colonel (acting) John Maurice Palin, ERD, (220772), Corps of Royal Engineers, Army Emergency Reserve.
- Lieutenant-Colonel Kenneth Douglas Patterson, TD, (314592), Royal Corps of Signals, Territorial Army.
- Lieutenant-Colonel Francis Hallam Potter, (57075), Royal Army Service Corps.
- Lieutenant-Colonel Kellow James Kidston Pye, (47631), The Suffolk Regiment.
- Lieutenant-Colonel Peter Crofton Sanders, TD, (52977), Intelligence Corps, Territorial Army.
- Brevet and Temporary Lieutenant-Colonel Jeremy Michael Spencer-Smith, MC, (138650), Welsh Guards.
- Lieutenant-Colonel (Quartermaster) Frederick Spearpoint, (384854), Royal Corps of Signals.
- Lieutenant-Colonel (temporary) Denis Edward Thackeray, MBE, (126334), Corps of Royal Engineers.
- Lieutenant-Colonel Peile Thompson, MBE, (53109), The King's Regiment (Manchester and Liverpool).
- Lieutenant-Colonel (now Colonel) Harold Michael Hanslip Ward, TD, (68696), late Royal Regiment of Artillery, Territorial Army.
- Lieutenant-Colonel Oliver Geoffrey Woodhouse White, DSO, (47671), The Devonshire and Dorset Regiment (now R.A.R.O.).
- Lieutenant-Colonel Charles Frederick Wicks, (123564), Royal Army Medical Corps (now Retired).
- Lieutenant-Colonel Louis George Wilkes, MC, (117053), Royal Regiment of Artillery.
- Lieutenant-Colonel (now Colonel) Peter John Wilkinson, (375966), late Royal Regiment of Artillery.
- Lieutenant-Colonel James Vaughan Williams, DSO, TD, (62311), Corps of Royal Engineers, Territorial Army (now T.A.R.O.).
- Lieutenant-Colonel (temporary) Douglas Andrew Conyngham Forbes, TD, (144361), Corps of Royal Engineers; on loan to the Government of Pakistan.
- Lieutenant-Colonel Charles Marius Bernard, ED, Commanding Officer, British Guiana Volunteer Force.
- Lieutenant-Colonel John Costello Taylor Peddie, MC, (363994), The Duke of Edinburgh's Royal Regiment (Berkshire and Wiltshire) (Employed List (1)). Officer Commanding, 4th Battalion, The King's African Rifles.

Royal Air Force

- Wing Commander Jack Cassell, (46591).
- Wing Commander Karl Ernest Christensen, (123190).
- Wing Commander John Oswald Dalley DFM, (130136).
- Wing Commander (Acting Group Captain) Edwin Earnshaw.
- Wing Commander Geoffrey Goodman, MBE, DFC, (45491).
- Wing Commander Gordon Hampton, DFC, (50204).
- Wing Commander Thomas Benedict Jones, (89409), (Retired).
- Wing Commander William Henry Kearney, (34159), (Retired).
- Wing Commander Norman Sykes Petch, (45357).
- Wing Commander Charles Edward Pulham Suttle, (75306).
- Wing Commander Arthur Ronald Michael Watts, (58906).
- Wing Commander Charles Herbert Wiggins, (105363).
- Acting Wing Commander Andrew McKinlay, (101307), Royal Air Force Volunteer Reserve (Training Branch).
- Acting Wing Commander Peter Donald George Venus Whittingham, MD, BS, (59790).
- Squadron Leader Richard William Clark, (31261).
- Squadron Leader John Harold Cooke, (58731).
- Squadron Leader Derrick Francis Miller, DFC, (153186).
- Squadron Leader Charles Ernest Ness, (166399).
- Squadron Leader Hans Neubroch, (152210).
- Squadron Leader William Neill Perioli, DFC, (39391).

Civil Division

- Ronald George Handley Abraham, Chief Executive Officer, War Office.
- Frederick Stephen Adams, Treasurer, Birmingham Regional Hospital Board.
- Ruth Allcroft, Senior Research Officer, Grade II, Ministry of Agriculture, Fisheries and Food.
- Charles Reginald Allen, lately Superintending Electrical Engineer, Admiralty.
- Marguerite Katharine Mary Allport, JP. For political and public services in Bournemouth.
- Charles William Andrews, Deputy Chief Lands Officer, Air Ministry.
- Hugh Donald Andrews, Senior Chief Executive Officer, Board of Trade.
- Gerard Marsham Argles. For political services in the Wrekin.
- Kenneth Samuel Arnold, Director and General Manager, Duncan Stewart & Co. Ltd. Member, Scottish Joint Committee for Management Studies.
- Lieutenant-Colonel Thomas Aveling, MC, TD. For political services in Devon.
- David Errington Barnes, GM, Senior Superintendent, Group Safety, Atomic Weapons Research Establishment, Aldermaston.
- John Donald Beard, MBE, Honorary Secretary, Oldbury Savings Committee, Birmingham.
- Thomas Bedford, Director, Environmental Hygiene Research Unit, Medical Research Council.
- Commander Kenneth Barrington Best, MVO, Royal Navy (Retired), Director of Communications, Home Office.
- Frederick Barrett Birdsall, District Probate Registrar, Newcastle upon Tyne and Durham.
- Reginald Walter Bishop, Superintending Civil Engineer, Admiralty.
- George Blackburn, Assistant Chief Constable, West Riding of Yorkshire.
- Muriel Marian Bongard, Grade 2 Officer, Ministry of Labour and National Service.
- Harry Bowley, Senior Principal Scientific Officer, National Physical Laboratory, Department of Scientific and Industrial Research.
- William Boyce, Principal, Ministry of Agriculture, Fisheries and Food.
- Reginald Breffit, Chief Constable, East Sussex Constabulary.
- Albert Brewin, Senior Principal Scientific Officer, Explosives Research and Development Establishment, Ministry of Supply.
- Charles Attfield Brooks, TD, JP, DL, Member of Wheat Deficiency Payments Advisory Committee, Ministry of Agriculture, Fisheries and Food.
- Gabe Robb Bryce, Chief Test Pilot, Vickers-Armstrongs (Aircraft) Ltd.
- Arthur William Buckley, Senior Principal Clerk, Board of Inland Revenue.
- George Thomas Bullock, MBE, Chairman, Bristol Disablement Advisory Committee.
- Evelyn Christina Busby, JP, Diocesan Secretary for St. Albans.
- Gwilym John Butler, Headmaster, Craig-yr-Eos Secondary Modern School for Boys, Rhondda.
- Nelson Thomas Carne, JP, Joint Managing Director, National Cash Register Co. (Manufacturing) Ltd.
- Joseph Bernard Casey, Assistant Accountant and Comptroller General, Board of Inland Revenue.
- Captain Clifford Henry Churchill, Commodore Master, MV Swiftpool, Sir Robert Ropner & Co. (Management) Ltd.
- George Farren Clarke, Senior Principal Scientific Officer, Royal Aircraft Establishment, Ministry of Supply.
- Ernest Alfred Cqmpton, Honorary Treasurer, County of London Boy Scouts Association.
- Leslie Colin Cook, MD, lately Medical Superintendent, Bexley (Mental) Hospital; President, Royal Medico-Psychological Association.
- Anthony Mitchell Beresford-Cooke, Head of Planning and Construction, Engineering Department, Independent Television Authority.
- Wilfred Hood Covington, Director, Middle East Department, British Council.
- Percy Edward Cross, County Advisory Officer, Isle of Ely, National Agricultural Advisory Service.
- John Churchill Brodie Date, Grade B.I. Officer, Foreign Office.
- Montague Davenport, Principal, London Communications Electronic Security Agency.
- David Lewis Davies, JP, Chairman, Welsh National Council of Young Men’s Christian Association.
- Wilfred Dawes, Headmaster, Mortimer Wilson Secondary Modern School, Alfreton, Derbyshire.
- Warren Royal Dawson. For services to historical research.
- Charles-Louis Leopold Alfred de Beaumont, President, Amateur Fencing Association and British Empire and Commonwealth Fencing Federation.
- Major David Devine, MBE, JP, Chairman, County Fermanagh Savings Committee.
- Eric John Dickie, MBE, Deputy Director, Operations, Civil Aviation Control and Navigation Directorate, Ministry of Transport and Civil Aviation.
- William Edmondson Dornan, MRCS, LRCP, Chairman, Medical Practices Committee, England and Wales.
- Blackwood Roulston Douglass, General Manager, Londonderry Port and Harbour Board.
- Ida May Coffin Duncan, Commissioner, Board of Control, Ministry of Health.
- Gerald Eastham, Chief Officer, Worcester City and County Fire Brigade.
- James Elliot, JP, Provost of Jedburgh.
- Lionel James Carlyon Evans, Agricultural Officer, Colonial Development Corporation.
- William Giraldus Evans, Chairman, Cardiff National Insurance Local Appeal Tribunal.
- Doris Mary Finch, MBE, County Organiser, Berkshire, Women's Voluntary Services.
- Harry Edward William Firman, lately Higher Collector, London South, Board of Customs and Excise.
- Bud Flanagan (Robert Winthrop), Comedian.
- William Henry Ford, MBE, Chief Executive Officer, Commonwealth Relations Office.
- Horace Fairie Francis, Director of Labour Relations, British Film Producers' Association.
- Reginald Herbert Francis, Senior Partner of L. A. Francis & Sons. For services to the Building Industry.
- John Leslie Fryer, Head Postmaster, Norwich.
- Robert William Gadsdon, Controller, Statistical Office, Board of Customs and Excise.
- David Galloway, Chairman, Association of Multiple Retail Meat Traders.
- Cecil Arthur Gardner, Deputy Crown Estate Surveyor, Office of the Crown Estate Commissioners.
- George Dudley Gardner, MC, Organisation and Methods Consultant, War Office.
- Samuel James Garton, MBE, Chief Investigator, Ministry of Housing and Local Government.
- Jack Arnold Geer, Superintending Estate Surveyor, Ministry of Works.
- David Watson Gieve. For political and public services in Guildford.
- Carl Ronald Giles, Cartoonist.
- Francis Gilderoy Glossop, Production Director, North Western Division, National Coal Board.
- David Watson Gourlay. For political services in Gloucestershire.
- Derek Robert Graesser, Member, North Wales District Committee, Welsh Board for Industry.
- Kenneth Oliver Grant, Assistant Director of Aircraft Equipment Production, Ministry of Supply.
- Donald Christopher Gray, lately Solicitor to Greenwich Hospital.
- Laurence Hague, Senior Administrative Assistant, City of Birmingham Education Department.
- John Claude Hamson, JP, Chairman, Bedford Local Employment Committee.
- Robert Charles Harman, Head of Operations and Maintenance, Engineering Department, Independent Television Authority.
- Henry Hart, Joint Chairman, Yorkshire Coalfield Savings Advisory Committee.
- Benjamin James Hartwell, lately Honorary Secretary, Justices Clerks' Society of England and Wales.
- Alderman William Harvey, Deputy Secretary of the Northern Ireland Hospitals Authority.
- Harold Spedding Haslam, Secretary, Urban District Councils Association.
- Marjorie Hayward, Principal, Ministry of Labour and National Service.
- Eric George Heath, Principal Inspector of Taxes, Board of Inland Revenue.
- Beatrice Martha Heaton, JP. For political and public services in Bradford.
- George Frederick Henson, MBE, Chairman, Manchester & District War Pensions Committee.
- Albert Ernest Hewitt, Superintending Structural Engineer, Ministry of Works.
- Marjorie Hickling, JP, Head of Training Department, Women's Voluntary Services.
- Commander Eustace Leonard Hill, Royal Navy (Retired), Head of Civil Affairs, Sea Cadet Corps Headquarters.
- Frederick Thomas Hill, Waterguard Superintendent, Cardiff, Board of Customs and Excise.
- Ralph Hobday, Senior Architect, Imperial War Graves Commission.
- Willie Holdsworth, Alderman, Dewsbury County Borough, West Riding of Yorkshire.
- Ambrose Hunter, Managing Director, Cook, Welton & Gemmell Ltd., Beverley, Yorkshire.
- George Walker Ireland, MB, ChB, JP, General Practitioner in Midlothian.
- Henry Braid Irving, Chairman, Noise Research Committee, Aeronautical Research Council.
- William Leonard Ives, Principal Traffic Officer, British Transport Waterways.
- Elsie Alice Jamieson, Alderman, Twickenham Borough Council.
- Charles Alfred Jarman, Senior Principal Scientific Officer, Ministry of Defence.
- Thomas Evan Jenkins, Alderman, Merioneth County Council.
- David Scott Johnston, Controller, Scotland, National Assistance Board.
- Herbert James King, Chartered Surveyor. For services to Government Departments.
- James Osborne Lang. For political and public services in Paisley.
- Sidney Latin. For political and public services in Manchester.
- Charles John Vivian Lawson, Engineer-in-Chief, Cable & Wireless
- Jessie Simpson Lawson, Assistant Chief Labour Management Officer, Ministry of Supply.
- Charles Robert Leake, Chairman, Eastern Sea Fisheries District Joint Committee.
- Helen Grace Liddell, Head of Information Department, Royal Institute of International Affairs.
- William Hatherell Limerick, lately Deputy Chairman, Gloucestershire Agricultural Executive Committee.
- Terence Desmond Loughlin, Controller, Navy, Army and Air Force Institutes, Far East.
- Eric Alfred Lyons, Architect.
- Joseph MacDowall. For services in charge of the International Geophysical Year programme at the Royal Society Base, Halley Bay.
- Alexander Robert McFarlane, LDS, DDS, JP, Chairman, Scottish Dental Estimates Board.
- Frank Leslie McHenry, Principal, HM Treasury.
- Alexander William Mackay, Rector, Dingwall Academy, Ross-shire.
- William Mackay (Senior). For political services in Inverness-shire.
- Captain John Logan McQueen, Master, SS Corinaldo, Donaldson Line Ltd.
- George William Maile, lately Assistant Official Receiver, Bankruptcy, Board of Trade.
- Joyce Louise Mann, TD. For political services.
- Hermann Mannheim. For services to criminological research.
- John Reid Martin, LRCP, LRCS(Ed.). For political services in County Tyrone.
- Margaret Lauder Martin, Member, Council of the Girl Guides Association.
- Alexander Masson, MBE, Firemaster, Perth and Kinross Fire Brigade.
- John Harvey Moore, Temporary Grade 2 Officer, Branch "B", Foreign Office.
- Alderman Neil Muldoon, JP. For political and public services in Middlesex.
- Major Arthur William Neve, TD, Secretary, Gamekeepers Association.
- Timothy O'Leary, National Secretary (Docks Group), Transport & General Workers' Union.
- Athol Penhorwood Oliver, Principal Examiner, Patent Office, Board of Trade.
- Hugh O'Neill, General Secretary and Treasurer, Radio Officers' Union.
- Francis Harry Ostime, Principal Inspector of Taxes, Board of Inland Revenue.
- Donald Ashford Palmer, lately President of the Sheffield Cutlery Manufacturers Association.
- Frank Richard Parsons, DFC. For political and public services in Northamptonshire.
- William Henry Parsons, MVO, Principal, Air Ministry.
- Joseph Clarence Patterson, lately Procurator Fiscal, Hamilton.
- George Paul, MBE, Member of the National Savings Committee representing the National Union of Teachers.
- Norman John Payne, MBE, Partner, Messrs. Frederick Snow & Partners.
- John Edward Pennifold, MBE, Senior Chief Executive Officer, Air Ministry.
- William Alfred Pillinger, lately Grade 2 Officer, Ministry of Labour and National Service.
- Gilbert Ashton Plummer, Director and Chief Engineer, John Thompson Water Tube Boilers Ltd., Wolverhampton.
- David Poston, lately Commodore Chief Engineer, Port Line Ltd.
- William Skirrow Procter, Chief Regional Engineer, London Telecommunications Region, General Post Office.
- Herbert James Rathbone, Deputy Chairman, Denbigh Agricultural Executive Committee.
- Harold Francis Sidney Rickerby, MBE, Senior Chief Executive Officer, Ministry of Transport and Civil Aviation.
- Edward Ernest Roberts, MBE, lately Chief Executive Officer, Ministry of Pensions and National Insurance.
- Sir James Denby Roberts, Bt., Chairman, Scottish Society for Research in Plant Breeding.
- Claude Maurice Rogers, Painter.
- Leila Gwendoline Ross, Director, Buckinghamshire Branch, British Red Cross Society.
- Langshaw Rowland, President, Royal Forestry Society of England and Wales.
- Frederick Allan Rowley, MC, First Secretary, Foreign Office.
- Alfred Russell, JP. For services to Education in County Down.
- Samuel Hibbert Russell, Chairman, S. Russell & Sons Ltd., Leicester.
- Lieutenant-Colonel Edward Warren Caulfeild Sandes, DSO, MC, Regimental Historian.
- Robert Charles Savage. For political services in Westbury, Wiltshire.
- William Pertwee Seabrook, Horticulturist. For services to fruit growing.
- Denis John Seymour, Chief Executive Officer, Ministry of Education.
- John Charles Sharman, Manager, Research and Development Division, Garringtons Ltd., Bromsgrove, Worcestershire.
- Robert Edward Graham Shillington, MBE, County Inspector, Royal Ulster Constabulary.
- Walter Reginald Thynne Skinner, Deputy Chairman, South Eastern Electricity Board.
- Percy Edward Sleight, Head, Department of Civil Engineering and Building, Brighton Technical College.
- Norman Carol Smart, Chief Engineer (Telephone and Exchange Systems), The General Electric Co. Ltd., Coventry.
- Ernest James Smithies, TD. For political and public services in the West Riding of Yorkshire.
- Sydney Reginald Speller, Secretary and Director of Education, Institute of Hospital Administrators.
- Brian Spencer, Senior District Inspector of Mines and Quarries, Scottish Division, Ministry of Power.
- George Henry Warburton-Steel. For services to Hospitals in Preston, Chorley and District, Lancashire.
- James Sinclair Stewart, lately Chairman, Edinburgh and South East Scotland Productivity Committee.
- Mollie Kate Stone, JP, Headmistress, Howell's School, Denbigh.
- Marjorie Storrs, JP. For political and public services in Cheshire.
- Cyril John Strother, MBE, Assistant to Chief Engineer, British Broadcasting Corporation.
- Lieutenant-Colonel Arthur Griffin, Tapp, MC, TD, Member, Territorial and Auxiliary Forces Association, Kent.
- Reginald Taylor, Chief Executive Officer, Ministry of Pensions and National Insurance.
- Tom Lowe Taylor, JP, Chairman, Stalybridge Local Employment Committee.
- William Russell Addison Taylor, Deputy Works General Manager, Capenhurst Works, Industrial Group, United Kingdom Atomic Energy Authority.
- Raymond Claude Thompson, Principal Officer, Ministry of Labour and National Insurance for Northern Ireland.
- William Alfred James Thorn, Deputy Director, Telecommunications, Ministry of Transport and Civil Aviation.
- Noel Mursell Timpson, President and Chairman, Manchester and District Federation of Lads' Clubs.
- George Tiplady, Inspector of Alkali, Ministry of Housing and Local Government.
- Reginald Robert Tomlinson, Chairman, Exhibition and Display Sub-Committee, Royal Society for the Prevention of Accidents.
- Commander Franklin George Tritton, Royal Navy (Retired), Works Manager, Sheffield Gauge Factory, Admiralty.
- George Antony Turner, Grade 7 Officer, Branch A, Foreign Office.
- William Reginald Tyson, Telephone Manager, Bournemouth General Post Office.
- John Charles Wade, JP, General Manager and Secretary, West Cumberland Farmers' Trading Society Ltd.
- George Edward Walker, JP, Secretary, Thames Conservancy.
- Alderman William Harold Walker, Chairman, Cheshire County Civil Defence Committee.
- Captain Thomas Herbert Wallace, MC, Chairman, County Down Committee of Agriculture.
- Lieutenant-Colonel Frederick Walton, Honorary Savings Officer for the Army Catering Corps.
- Alan Gordon Ward, Director of Research, British Gelatine and Glue Research Association.
- Ottiwell Henry Gordon Waterfield, Head of Arabic Service, British Broadcasting Corporation.
- Sylvia Bennett Watson, Children's Officer, Hertfordshire County Council.
- Hubert Claude Weston, Director, Research in Occupational Optics Group, Medical Research Council.
- John Pattullo Mackie Whyte, Conservator, Scotland, Forestry Commission.
- James Murray Widdecombe, Assistant Director of Armament Supply, Admiralty.
- Valentine Wilkinson, MC, MB, FRCS, Medical Officer, Waddon Industrial Rehabilitation Unit, Ministry of Labour and National Service.
- Robert John Willatt, JP. For services to Boys' Clubs in Nottinghamshire.
- Norman Ellis Williams, lately Education Officer, British Council, India. (Now Liaison Officer, British Council, Australia.)
- Thomas Wilson, JP, Chairman, County Antrim Welfare Committee.
- Louis Winter, JP, Chairman, Stockport Savings Committee, Cheshire.
- Alderman Albert Wolstencroft, MM, JP. For political and public services in Middleton and Prestwich.
- Edwin Kenneth Woodford, Senior Principal Scientific Officer, Agricultural Research Council Unit of Experimental Agronomy, Oxford.
- Hubert Leslie Woodgate, Chorus Master, British Broadcasting Corporation.
- Frederick Robert Woodward, Treasurer, Cornwall County Council.
- Joseph William Young, Chief Executive Officer, Ministry of Agriculture, Fisheries and Food.
- Ronald Frederick Zobel, Chief Meteorological Officer, Aden, Air Ministry.
- John George Barney, lately Her Majesty's Consul, Palermo.
- Henry Donald Bennetts, British subject resident in Portugal.
- Lieutenant-Colonel William Edge, Special Police Officer attached to Department of Public Security, Kuwait.
- George Edward Fox, British subject resident in Brazil.
- Niel Hone, MBE, MC, British Vice-Consul, Santiago de Cuba.
- Gladys Muriel Hunt, MBE, Chairman, British-American Hospital, Nice.
- The Reverend Harold Isherwood, MVO, lately Chaplain, St Edmund's Church, Oslo.
- Ian Ritchie Matheson, Estate Manager, Messrs. Harrisons & Crosfield, Medan.
- John Chevalier O'Dwyer, lately Her Majesty's Consul-General, Berlin.
- Edward Eric Orchard, First Secretary, Her Majesty's Embassy, Moscow.
- Christine Sandford, MBE, British subject resident in Ethiopia.
- Percival Samuel Schor, Head Master, British School, Montevideo.
- Commander Patrick William Stone, Royal Navy (Retired), British Visa Officer, New York.
- John Debenham Taylor, First Secretary, Office of the Commissioner-General for the United Kingdom in South-East Asia, Singapore.
- Clara Grace Thornton, MVO, Her Majesty's Consul, Copenhagen.
- Eric Walter Frederick Tomlin, British Council Representative, Turkey.
- James Terris Turbayne, General Manager, British Travel Association, United States of America.
- John Robert Allison. For services to the United Kingdom community in Karachi, Pakistan.
- Leonard Wilfred Andrew, of Waikerfe, State of South Australia. For services to the local community.
- The Reverend Francis Clune, MC, of the Roman Catholic Church in the State of New South Wales.
- Norman Scott Connal, formerly Headmaster of the Church of England Boys' Grammar School, Toowoomba, State of Queensland.
- Olive Dorothea Graeme Cornell (Miss Olive Wilton) of Hobart, State of Tasmania; in recognition of her work as an actress and a producer.
- James Alexander Costello, JP, Chairman of the Rosenthal Shire Council, State of Queensland.
- Simon Crawcour, of Launceston, State of Tasmania. For philanthropic services.
- Ernest Arthur Hardy, MD, Specialist Physician in Selangor, Federation of Malaya.
- James George Haskins, Deputy Chairman of the European Advisory Council, Bechuanaland Protectorate.
- Noel Hayton, Assistant Commissioner of the St. John Ambulance Brigade in the State of New South Wales.
- Cecil Leander Honey, Secretary for Labour, Social Welfare and Housing, Southern Rhodesia.
- Cyril Knight Jacka, Chairman of the Conservation Authority, State of New South Wales.
- David Fletcher Jones, of Warrnambool, State of Victoria. For services to the local community.
- Kenneth Jowers. For services to the United Kingdom community in New Delhi, India.
- George Ernest Maunder, of Sydney, State of New South Wales. For services to Local Government.
- Albert Musgrave Merriweather, MD, Superintending Missionary, Scottish Livingstone Hospital, Molepolole, Bechuanaland Protectorate.
- Harry Robert Meyer, of Ashbourne, State of South Australia. For services to the local community.
- William Sheridan Morcom. For services to the Grammar Schools of the State of Victoria.
- Doris Lyne Officer, MB, BS, Medical Officer, Free Kindergarten Union, State of Victoria.
- Desmond Stephen Palmer, Deputy Director, Special Branch, Federation of Malaya Police Force.
- William Walter Pettingell, General Manager of the Australian Gas Light Company in the State of New South Wales.
- Mervyn Noel Courtenay St. Quintin, MBE, Secretary/Comptroller (Finance) to the Governor of Southern Rhodesia.
- Raymond David Rex, of Richmond, via Mossman, State of Queensland. For services to Local Government.
- Stuart Waldemar Leslie Routley. For services to ex-servicemen in the State of Victoria.
- Sydney Murray Scott. For services to the United Kingdom community in Bombay, India.
- Arthur George Burton-Smith, a farmer in the Ghanzi District, Bechuanaland Protectorate.
- Reay Henry Noble Smithers, Director, National Museum, Bulawayo, Southern Rhodesia.
- Harry Crompton Wallwork, TD, Director of Studies, Federation Military College, Port Dickson, Federation of Malaya.
- Dorothy Yates, Headmistress of the Girton School for Girls, State of South Australia.
- Charles Peter Selwyn Allen, MVO, Permanent Secretary (Supervisor of Elections), Uganda.
- Frederick Lawrence Herbert Bascom, Senior Engineer, Crown Agents for Oversea Governments and Administrations.
- John Thomas Bennett. For public services in Tanganyika.
- Denis George Britton, MBE, Director of Audit, Mauritius.
- Frederick Charles Brookes, Deputy Commissioner of Police, Kenya.
- Hugh Boughey Burgess, MC, Chief Conservator of Forests, Western Region, Nigeria.
- Daphne Wai Chan Chun, FRCS(Ed.), Professor of Obstetrics and Gynaecology, University of Hong Kong.
- Peter Harper Cook, Commissioner of Labour, Federation of Nigeria.
- Ahmadu Coomassie, Chief Education Officer (Adult), Northern Region, Nigeria.
- Geoffrey Borough-Copley, Deputy Director of Public Works, North Borneo.
- Leonardo Sarto Da Silva, MD, Senior Pathologist, Singapore.
- Gwladys Davies, Principal Matron, Mauritius.
- James Angel Durante, MRCS, LRCP, Medical Officer of Health, Gibraltar.
- Ronald James Gammon, Director of Road Transport, Sierra Leone.
- John Simon Rawson Golding, FRCS, Senior Lecturer in Orthopaedics, University College Hospital of The West Indies.
- Ernest George Albert Grimwood, Director, London Office of Hong Kong Government.
- James Henry Hale, MD, Professor of Bacteriology, University of Malaya, Singapore.
- John Colman Hammond, Headmaster, Harrison College, Barbados.
- Edward James Hand. For public services in Kenya.
- Clinton Hart, Clerk of the Legislature, Jamaica.
- Joyce Veronica Herklots, Diocesan Education Secretary-General, Western Region, Nigeria.
- Peter Henry Hicks, Assistant Chief Engineer (Construction), East African Railways and Harbours Administration, East Africa High Commission.
- Charles Greaves Hill, lately Permanent Secretary, Ministry of Labour, Jamaica.
- Philip Lowther Hotchin, Senior Agricultural Officer, Mauritius.
- Geoffrey William Young Hucks, Administrative Officer, Class I, Tanganyika.
- Edward Alexander Clavier Hughes. For public services in St. Vincent, Windward Islands.
- Felix Ofurum Ihenacho, Commissioner in the United Kingdom for Eastern Region, Nigeria.
- William Brown Johnson, Public Market Superintendent, Bahamas.
- Olatunji Emeric Adeniyi-Jones, MB, ChB, Medical Officer of Health, Lagos Town Council, Nigeria.
- Yuet-Keung Kan. For public services in Hong Kong.
- Edgie Lapira, FDS, RCS, Emeritus Professor of Dental Surgery, Malta Central Hospital.
- Alan Charles Ledger. For public services in Zanzibar.
- James Fraser MacDonald, FRCS(Ed.), Senior Surgical Specialist, Northern Rhodesia.
- James Hugh Morrison McNaughton, Director, Geological Survey Department, Nyasaland.
- Donald Marshall, Permanent Secretary, Ministry of Local Government, Uganda.
- Richard Martin, BEM, Government Printer, Nyasaland.
- Maurice Charles Salles-Miquelle. For public services in St. Lucia, Windward Islands.
- Ernest Dunstan Morgan, MBE. For public services in Sierra Leone.
- Thomas Dunnachie Murphy, Electrical Superintendent, Belize Electricity Board, British Honduras.
- Colin Bruce Murray, Director of Lands and Surveys, Sarawak.
- Kenneth James Neale, Deputy Administrative Secretary, Cyprus.
- John Anthony Palfreman, Principal Immigration Officer, Kenya.
- Dahyabhai Kalyanbhai Patel. For public services in Tanganyika.
- John Warburton Paul, MC, Permanent Secretary, Sierra Leone.
- Tom Alan Phillips, Director of Agriculture, Eastern Region, Nigeria.
- Harry Gilbert Roberts. For public services in Bermuda.
- Ivor George Salmond. For public services in Singapore.
- Alhaji Muhammadu Sanusi, Sarkin Yakin Zazzau, Senior Councillor, Zaria Native Authority Council, Northern Region, Nigeria.
- William Tod Thom, MB, ChB, Director of Medical Services, Somaliland Protectorate.
- The Right Reverend Gilbert Price Lloyd Turner, Bishop of St. Helena.
- Kyriacos Nicolaou Vassiliades, Government Printer, Cyprus.
- James McIndoe Watson. For public services in Antigua, Leeward Islands.
- Arthur Francis Watts, Deputy Adviser and British Agent, Western Aden Protectorate.
- Leslie Edward Whitehouse, Administrative Officer, Kenya.

==== Member of the Order of the British Empire (MBE) ====
Military Division

Royal Navy

- Lieutenant-Commander William Hector Brereton.
- Major (Quartermaster) John Brown, BEM, Royal Marines.
- Instructor Lieutenant-Commander Thomas William Henry Foster.
- Supply Lieutenant-Commander Charles Harry Hann.
- Lieutenant-Commander James Stanley McCarthy.
- Lieutenant (S.D.) William Young McLanachan, BEM.
- Wardmaster Lieutenant-Commander Alfred Ernest Masters, BEM.
- Warrant Officer Aloysius Ola Oni, Nigerian Navy.
- Engineer Lieutenant-Commander Colin Frederick Parker.
- Lieutenant-Commander (Sp.) Hedley Punch, VRD, Royal Naval Reserve.
- Lieutenant-Commander (S.D.) Charles Stokes, (Retired).
- Lieutenant William Thorniley.
- Lieutenant-Commander Robert William Snowdon Winn.

Army

- Major (now Lieutenant-Colonel (temporary)) Norman Allison, MC, TD, (70829), Royal Army Service Corps.
- Major (acting) (now Honorary Lieutenant-Colonel) Leslie George Anniss, (272304), Army Cadet Force (now retired).
- Major (Quartermaster) Frederick George Lawrence Baddock, (263741), Royal Army Service Corps.
- Major Geoffrey George Baker, (386359), The Devonshire Regiment, Territorial Army.
- Major John Charles Balharrie, MC, TD, (74305), The Royal Scots Greys (2nd Dragoons), Royal Armoured Corps.
- Major (Quartermaster) Edward Henry Dean Bancroft, (399022), Royal Regiment of Artillery.
- Major (acting) Albert Jacob Barker, (395932), Army Cadet Force.
- 21001472 Warrant Officer Class II Robert Baxter, The Queen's Own Lowland Yeomanry, Royal Armoured Corps, Territorial Army.
- Major Alec Jack Bennett, (124713), The Parachute Regiment, Territorial Army.
- Major (temporary) (now Captain) Peter Mudie Boileau, (354244), 1st The Queen's Dragoon Guards, Royal Armoured Corps.
- Major Frank Swinstead Britton, (243228), Royal Army Ordnance Corps.
- Major William Kemmis Buckley, (219080), Welsh Guards.
- 22283443 Warrant Officer Class I Samuel Robert Bull, Mobile Defence Corps, Army Emergency Reserve.
- 6666443 Warrant Officer Class II Thomas Ian Bulpin, The Gordon Highlanders, Territorial Army.
- Major (temporary) Robin MacDonald Carnegie, (364503), The Queen's Own Hussars, Royal Armoured Corps.
- 22511117 Warrant Officer Class II Arthur Edward Charnock, The Cheshire Regiment, Territorial Army.
- 553943 Warrant Officer Class I Patrick Cleere, DCM, The Queen's Own Hussars, Royal Armoured Corps.
- Major (acting) John Francis Coghlan, (293577), Combined Cadet Force.
- Major George Arthur Russell Collier, (301875), Royal Army Service Corps.
- S/57620 Warrant Officer Class I William Edward Cook, Royal Army Service Corps.
- Major Leslie Michael Lonsdale-Cooper, MC, TD, (79990), The York and Lancaster Regiment, Territorial Army.
- 21015643 Warrant Officer Class I William Peter Cooper, 3rd Greenjackets, The Rifle Brigade.
- Major Henry George Antony Cordwent, (253972), Royal Army Pay Corps.
- 22262823 Warrant Officer Class II Victor Henry Cox, Royal Regiment of Artillery, Territorial Army.
- Captain (Quartermaster) Arthur George Everett, (442445), Grenadier Guards.
- Captain Frank Charles Edward Fare, (324471), Army Catering Corps.
- Major (Quartermaster) Percy Fred Ford, (384085), Corps of Royal Engineers.
- Major (honorary) James Andrew Foss, (163882), late Royal Regiment of Artillery, (Retired).
- 1667882 Warrant Officer Class I (Bandmaster) Thomas James Fraser, Royal Regiment of Artillery, Territorial Army.
- Major Thomas Reginald Gascoigne, (285681), Corps of Royal Engineers.
- Captain John Vincent Gatt, (325966), Intelligence Corps.
- Major (Quartermaster) John William Gay, (316329), Army Physical Training Corps.
- Major (Quartermaster) Ronald George Jeremiah Genge, (348382), Corps of Royal Electrical and Mechanical Engineers.
- Major Ivor Dennis Gibb, (210817), The Royal Warwickshire Regiment (now R.A.R.O.).
- Major (temporary) Laurie William Albert Gingell, (283239), Royal Tank Regiment, Royal Armoured Corps.
- W/12869 Warrant Officer Class II Violet Kathleen Hamilton, Women's Royal Army Corps.
- Lieutenant (Quartermaster) Harold Hardy, (460878), The King's Own Yorkshire Light Infantry.
- Major (Quartermaster) Stanley Samuel Hawkins, (329362), Corps of Royal Engineers.
- 5378969 Warrant Officer Class II Frederick Ernest Hickman, The Oxfordshire and Buckinghamshire Light Infantry, Territorial Army.
- 5194307 Warrant Officer Class II Trevor Hier, The Gloucestershire Regiment, Territorial Army.
- Major (Ordnance Executive Officer) George Hodgson, (231927), Royal Army Ordnance Corps.
- Major Thomas Francis Jouning, TD, (90677), Royal Army Medical Corps.
- Major (Quartermaster) William Ephraim Kille, (246832), The Buffs (Royal East Kent Regiment).
- Major (temporary) Frank Edward Kitson, MC, (362061), 3rd Greenjackets, The Rifle Brigade.
- 21003329 Warrant Officer Class II Frederick Henry Lake, Royal Regiment of Artillery, Territorial Army.
- Major Henry David Lowther, (56591), Royal Regiment of Artillery.
- 22294012 Warrant Officer Class II Samuel Alfred Lucas, The Welch Regiment, Territorial Army.
- 22256484 Warrant Officer Class II David Mitchell, MM, The Argyll and Sutherland Highlanders (Princess Louise's), Territorial Army.
- Major Sydney Alfred Moore, (117789), Royal Regiment of Artillery.
- Major Ernest Harold Morgan, MC, (339778), The Suffolk Regiment.
- 10545199 Warrant Officer Class I Horace Roland Moules, Royal Army Ordnance Corps.
- Major Derek Andre Alton-Nagel, TD, (97584), Royal Regiment of Artillery.
- 22268866 Warrant Officer Class I Patrick Joseph Neale, The Royal Northumberland Fusiliers, Territorial Army.
- Major (acting) Frederick Charles Nicklin, TD, (91688), Army Cadet Force.
- Major Hugh Justin O'Neill, ERD, TD, (89717), Royal Regiment of Artillery, Territorial Army.
- 2695724 Warrant Officer Class I George Paterson, The Black Watch (Royal Highland Regiment).
- Major Ronald Matthew Pearson, LDS, (283274), Royal Army Dental Corps.
- Captain (Quartermaster) Alfred Albert Pilgrim, MM, (413062), The Northamptonshire Regiment, Territorial Army.
- Major Robert Laslett John Pott, MC, (95241), The King's Own Royal Regiment (Lancaster); attached Trucial Oman Scouts.
- 2027492 Warrant Officer Class I (acting) Herbert Price, The South Staffordshire Regiment.
- 4343214 Warrant Officer Class I (Bandmaster) Reginald Arthur John Pritchard, The Northamptonshire Regiment.
- Major (temporary) Ivor Basil Ramsden, (403662), Welsh Guards.
- Major Leslie Frederick Richards, (380592), Corps of Royal Military Police.
- Major (Quartermaster) Frederick Heslop Robson, (266057), 10th Royal Hussars (Prince of Wales's Own), Royal Armoured Corps.
- 843990 Warrant Officer Class I (Artillery Clerk) George Arthur Pettit Rowlatt, Royal Regiment of Artillery.
- 5441267 Warrant Officer Class I Harold Frederick Royffe, The Duke of Cornwall's Light Infantry.
- S/5058346 Warrant Officer Class I (acting) (now Warrant Officer Class II) Jules Leon St. Romaine, Royal Army Service Corps.
- Major Wilfred Herbert James Sale, MC, (234315), 3rd/4th County of London Yeomanry (Sharpshooters), Royal Armoured Corps, Territorial Army.
- 2612402 Warrant Officer Class I Percival John Sedgwick, Corps of Royal Military Police.
- Major William Boughtflower Sedgwick, (203825), Intelligence Corps.
- 19036916 Warrant Officer Class II Maurice Peter Slingo, 12th Royal Lancers (Prince of Wales's), Royal Armoured Corps.
- Major Henry Thomas Stanley, (237116), Royal Pioneer Corps.
- 3718101 Warrant Officer Class I Ronald Joseph Taylor, The King's Regiment (Manchester and Liverpool).
- Major (Quartermaster) Stanley Charles Walford, (356140), Royal Regiment of Artillery.
- S/1459320 Warrant Officer Class I Gerald Henry Walke, Royal Army Service Corps.
- Major Richard Carless Wilkins, TD, (89662), The Wiltshire Regiment (Duke of Edinburgh's), Territorial Army.
- Lieutenant-Colonel George Thomas Wheeler Collins, Home Guard, Federation of Malaya.
- S/6479223 Warrant Officer Class II Henry Albert Jenkins, BEM, Royal Army Service Corps. Personal Assistant to the General Officer Commanding, East Africa Command.

Royal Air Force

- Squadron Leader Ronald Brickwood, (57611).
- Squadron Leader Leslie William Denning, (56761).
- Squadron Leader Douglas Houghton, (147740).
- Squadron Leader Edward Lawrence McMullen, (176322), RAF Regiment.
- Squadron Leader Frank Reginald Pusey, (55599).
- Squadron Leader Frederick Thomas Russell, (53615).
- Squadron Leader Anthony Barrie Smith, (50923).
- Squadron Leader (now Acting Wing Commander) Allan Ainslie Storar, (51293).
- Squadron Leader Jim Wass, (52456).
- Squadron Leader Thomas Charles Douay Whiteside, MB, ChB, (203221).
- Squadron Leader William Wright, (48835).
- Acting Squadron Leader Gilbert John Brewer, (58920).
- Acting Squadron Leader John Harvey Hunt, (567609).
- Acting Squadron Leader Thomas Knox, (114543), Royal Air Force Volunteer Reserve (Training Branch).
- Acting Squadron Leader Leonard Victor Mansfield Price, (63017), Royal Air Force Volunteer Reserve (Training Branch).
- Acting Squadron Leader Horace Charles Puxlet, (51205).
- Flight Lieutenant Ronald Courtney Bowers, (575237).
- Flight Lieutenant William Cecil George Budden, BEM, (567472).
- Flight Lieutenant Leonard Carey Evans, (57940).
- Flight Lieutenant Leon Ypres Jack Friend, DFC, (46732).
- Flight Lieutenant Josef Grant, (82526).
- Flight Lieutenant Alfred Jackson, (569869).
- Flight Lieutenant Basil Millman, (137035), (Retired).
- Flight Lieutenant Keith Stanlawse O'Brien, (3031247).
- Flight Lieutenant Herbert Richardson, (46652).
- Flight Lieutenant Ronald Robinson, (501825).
- Flight Lieutenant Thomas Anthony Robinson, (1680408).
- Flight Lieutenant William Holden Robinson, DFC, DFM, (48464).
- Flight Lieutenant William Kirkwood Sewell, (2201279).
- Flight Lieutenant Ernest Gordon Smith, (150968), Royal Auxiliary Air Force.
- Flight Lieutenant Thomas Doig Walker, (166377).
- Flight Lieutenant James Mann Waters, (52230).
- Flying Officer Clifford McAllister, (629971).
- Acting Flying Officer Leslie Dobson, (571427).
- Master Technician Stephen John Cameron, (574624).
- Master Technician William Gilfillan, (1378729).
- Master Technician Leonard Francis Paddock, (546274).
- Warrant Officer Daniel Richard Calcutt, (562513).
- Warrant Officer Thomas Henry Doughty, (510257).
- Warrant Officer Robert Fox, BEM, (526978).
- Warrant Officer Walter Graham, (521640).
- Warrant Officer Bertram Ernest Neale Hayles, (566136).
- Warrant Officer Robert James Legge, (541033).
- Warrant Officer Bernard Lewis, (590550).
- Warrant Officer Richard McDermott, BEM, (648042).
- Warrant Officer Ralph Waud, (590968).

Civil Division

- William Scott Abbott, JP, lately Member, Huntingdonshire, and Soke of Peterborough Agricultural Executive Committee.
- Matthew Adamson, Blast Furnace Projects Engineer, Ashmore Benson Pease & Co.
- Robert Hugh Allan, Chairman, Newcastle, Hexham and District War Pensions Committee.
- Charles Allsop, Chief Research Engineer, Bruce Peebles & Co. Ltd., Edinburgh.
- Jack Andrews, JP, Chairman, Colchester Local Employment Committee.
- Harold William Annetts, Member, Wiltshire County Council.
- John Walter Armitage. For political and public services in North Somerset.
- Percy Armstrong, Superintendent, Erecting Shop, W. H. Allen, Sons & Co. Ltd., Bedford.
- Elizabeth Arnold, lately Senior Personnel Officer, Montague Burton Ltd.
- Howard James Aveling, Manager, Peterborough Employment Exchange, Lincolnshire.
- Jack Howell Westwood Axtell, Senior Museum Assistant, British Museum.
- Commander Geoffrey John Tress Bahin, Royal Navy (Retired), General Secretary, Kent Council of Social Service.
- Kate Sarah Dennis Baker, JP. For political and public services in South London.
- Dora Band, Executive Officer, Ministry of Defence.
- Winifred Bates, Honorary Secretary, English Electric Co., Stafford, Savings Group.
- Ernest Albert Beasant, Principal Lay Officer and Chief Welfare Officer, Municipal Health Department, Southend County Borough.
- Horace Norman Beckett, Higher Executive Officer, National Assistance Board.
- Clifford Beevers, Chairman, North East Branch, Association of Drainage Authorities.
- Isaac Edward Bell, Secretary, North Armagh Hospital Management Committee.
- Lewis Lloyd Bell, Honorary Organiser, Armstrong Primary School Savings Group, Armagh.
- Walter Bell, JP, Provost of The Royal Burgh of Sanquhar, Dumfriesshire.
- William Claude Elder Bell, Manager, Dorman, Long (Steel) Ltd., Middlesbrough.
- Arthur Benjamin Bennett, Works Superintendent (Weapons Division), Fairey Aviation Co. Ltd.
- Edwin Berry, Deputy Manager, Contracts Department, Vickers-Armstrongs Ltd.
- William Henry Bickle, Senior Experimental Officer, Department of Scientific and Industrial Research.
- John Clarke Bidgood, lately Chief Superintendent, Metropolitan Police Force.
- Jack Henry Edwin Biggs, Senior Executive Officer, Board of Trade.
- Harold Blackmore, Managing Director, M. W. Blackmore & Sons Ltd., Bideford.
- James Montgomery Blackstock, Higher Executive Officer, National Assistance Board.
- Irene Dorothy Blakemore, Member of East Lothian Local Savings Committee.
- Winifred Frances Bonas, JP, Regional Staff, (Services Welfare), Women's Voluntary Services, North Midland Region.
- Walter Edward Rawson-Bottom, Engineer (Main Grade), Ministry of Works.
- Gertrude Bowen, Member, Ikleton Parish Council, Cambridgeshire.
- Gwilym Morris Bowen, Field Officer Grade II, Ministry of Agriculture, Fisheries and Food, Pembrokeshire.
- Thomas Bowman, Chief Superintendent, Leeds City Police.
- John Armitage Briddon, Higher Executive Officer, War Office.
- Constance Kathleen Brind, Chief Executive Officer, Savings Department, General Post Office.
- John William Brown, Engineer II, Royal Ordnance Factory, Blackburn, Ministry of Supply.
- Stanley Brumby, JP, District Organiser, National Union of Agricultural Workers, Lindsey Division of Lincolnshire.
- Brian George Buckley, Higher Executive Officer, Board of Customs and Excise.
- Arthur Ledger Budd, Chief Telecommunications Superintendent, Air Ministry.
- John James Bunday, Grade 3 Officer, Ministry of Labour and National Service.
- Percy Fred Burgess, Senior Auditor, Exchequer and Audit Department.
- John Henry Burton, Production Manager, Asbestos-Cement Moulded Goods Division, Turners Asbestos Cement Co. Ltd.
- Edith Hannah Bushby. For political and public services in Cumberland.
- Phyllis Annie Butcher, Executive Officer, Ministry of Health.
- William Harold Butchers, Higher Executive Officer, Home Office.
- Tom Cliff Buttrey, Headmaster, Prince's Street Junior School, Wellington, Shropshire.
- Mary Sarah Nora Byrne, Higher Executive Officer, Commonwealth Relations Office.
- Graham George Cann, Secretary, Grimsby United Fish Merchants' and Fish Curers' Association Ltd.
- Alderman Johnson Ernest Cann. For public services in Harwich.
- Abram Maxwell Caplin. For political and public services in Liverpool.
- Stanley Carlier, Executive Officer, Board of Trade.
- Arthur Chase, Senior Executive Officer, Ministry of Supply.
- Alfred Cheesman, Grade 3 Officer, Branch B, Foreign Office.
- Eleanora Frieda Chester, County Organiser, North Caernarvonshire, Women's Voluntary Services.
- George Chreseson, lately Chief Administrative Officer, Roads and Bridges Department, Shropshire County Council.
- Frederick John Henry Clarke, Senior Telecommunications Superintendent, Long Distance Area, General Post Office.
- Gerald Frederick Clarke, Higher Executive Officer, Ministry of Pensions and National Insurance.
- Percy Herbert Clarke, Clerical Officer, Staff College, Camberley.
- Captain John Fox Clement, DSC, RD, Chairman, Executive Committee, Pilots' Section, Transport and General Workers' Union.
- Mary Lily Goldman, Executive Officer, Ministry of Agriculture, Fisheries and Food.
- Robert William James Cole, Principal Production Inspector, Admiralty.
- Harry Collier, Surveyor to the Preston Rural District Council.
- Edward Chorley Cookson, Assistant Civil Engineer, Western Region, British Railways.
- Maurice Tone Corrigan, Executive Officer, Ministry of Transport and Civil Aviation.
- David Craine. For services to Manx traditional culture.
- Donald John Cresswell, Regional Commissioner, West Midland Region, National Savings Committee.
- Sidney Rowland Cresswell, Divisional Organiser, Amalgamated Engineering Union.
- Reginald Ernest Crocker, Higher Clerical Officer, Ministry of Defence.
- Frederick William Cross, Higher Executive Officer, Air Ministry.
- Elsie Elizabeth Crotty, Grade 4 Officer, Branch B, Foreign Office.
- Thomas Henry Cumberlidge. For charitable services in Hyde, Cheshire.
- Frances Janet Dale. For social services in Bradford.
- Robert Darling Kirton-Darling, District Advisory Officer, Grade III, National Agricultural Advisory Service.
- Ernest Davies, Chief Clerk, Regimental Depot of the South Wales Borderers.
- Alec Godfree Davis, Chief Cashier, British Broadcasting Corporation.
- Colonel Arthur Edward Davis, TD. For political and public services in South Wales.
- Victor Ely Debenham, Superintendent, Parcel Section (Foreign), General Post Office.
- Leena Michael Devaraj, Radio Announcer and Programme Assistant, Forces Broadcasting Unit, Singapore, War Office.
- James Dallas Dixon, Grade 3 Officer, Ministry of Labour and National Service.
- Walter Henry Dixon, Electricity Service Manager, March, Eastern Electricity Board.
- Raymond Doherty, City Librarian, York.
- William Thomas Doherty, JP. For political and public services in Liverpool.
- Charles Donald, Main Grade Engineer, Ministry of Transport and Civil Aviation.
- James Knight Donald, MB, ChB, Surgeon, RMS Pendennis Castle, Union-Castle Line.
- Donald Cameron-Douglas, Senior Investigating Officer, Ministry of Transport and Civil Aviation.
- Launcelot Victor Driffield, Secretary, Huddersfield Chamber of Commerce.
- Gerald Duckworth, Traffic Manager, Southdown Motor Services Ltd.
- Reginald Burdass Earwaker, Farmer. For services to the Army Air Corps.
- Percy Edward George Eden, Commercial Manager, Speedy Prompt Delivery Ltd.
- Edith Mary Lowe Else, JP. For welfare services in St. Helens.
- Dorothy Gladys Emery, District Nurse Midwife, Lyndhurst, Hampshire.
- Reginald Herbert Epps, MM, Secretary Eastern Gas Board.
- Gordon Walter Ette, County Further Education Organiser, Hampshire.
- Thomas Evans, Member of Glamorgan County Agricultural Executive Committee.
- David Charles Evemy, Accountant, Board of Customs and Excise.
- Edna Evenson, Superintendent, Shakespeare Street Nursery School, Manchester.
- Leonard Charles Everard, Higher Executive Officer, Commonwealth Relations Office.
- Robert Fairnie, BEM, President, Firth of Forth Fishermen's Association.
- Angela Falwasser, Ward Sister, Guy's Hospital, London.
- Stephenson Fletcher, MM, Senior Executive Officer, Ministry of Pensions and National Insurance.
- Reginald Francis George Flint, Senior Executive Officer, Air Ministry.
- Vera Adeline Frances Forbes, Leader, Young Men’s Christian Association, Episkopi, Cyprus.
- Kathleen Florence Forsdyke. For services as Executive Officer, Air Ministry.
- David Freeland. For services to the Ulster Poultry Federation.
- Harold Walter Robert Gale, Senior Executive Officer, Ministry of Pensions and National Insurance.
- Robert Reid Galloway, Senior Survey Clerk, West of Scotland District, Ministry of Transport and Civil Aviation.
- David Gardner, Manager, Partick Employment Exchange, Lanarkshire.
- James Henry Garmston, Vice-Chairman, Bristol and Bath District Advisory Committee, South Western Regional Board for Industry.
- Stella Mary Gatehouse. For political services.
- Phyllis Barbara Gates, County Secretary, Norfolk, National Federation of Women's Institutes.
- Francis Richard Isaac Gerrard, Head of Regional Department, National College of Food Technology.
- Daniel Leonard Glasscock, Senior Executive Officer, Ministry of Pensions and National Insurance.
- Jessie Lillian Glazebrook, Founder and Voluntary Transcriber, Students' Library, Royal National Institute for the Blind.
- Annie Isabella Godsman, Organiser, Fisherie Savings Group, King Edward, Banff, Aberdeenshire.
- Captain John Reginald Gorman, MC, District Inspector, Royal Ulster Constabulary.
- Frederick William Goulding. For political services.
- Isabel Frances Grant. For services to the Highland Folk Museum.
- Arthur John Green. For political and public services in Essex.
- Grace Emily Greenwood, Executive Officer, Ministry of Pensions and National Insurance.
- Edward Frederick Habicht, Executive Officer, Government Communications Headquarters.
- Ellen Louise Haggard, Centre Organiser, Torquay, Women's Voluntary Services.
- Christina Gordon Haldane, JP, Social Welfare Worker, Edinburgh Burgh, Church of Scotland Committee on Social Service.
- Agnes Halkes. For political and public services in Lincoln.
- Leslie Henry Hammond, MM, Driving and Traffic Examiner, Metropolitan Traffic Area, Ministry of Transport and Civil Aviation.
- Ernest John Harding, Chairman, Regional Joint Council, National Federation of Building Trades Operatives.
- Richard Edgar Hardman, Chief Civil Defence Officer, Turners Asbestos Cement Co. Ltd., Widnes.
- William Frank Harlow, Works Supervisor, Grade II, Admiralty.
- Richard Alfred Harman, Chief Civil Defence Training Officer, Imperial Chemical Industries Ltd., London.
- Robert Henry Harman, Chairman, Isle of Thanet, Dover and District War Pensions Committee.
- Herbert Harper, Chairman and Managing Director, J. E. Harper & Son Ltd., Birmingham.
- Jean Catherine Beatrice Harrison. For political and public services in Lincolnshire.
- Arthur Everett Hartley, Chairman, Wakefield National Assistance Appeal Tribunal.
- Ronald Arthur James Harvey. For political and public services in Hertfordshire.
- Raymond William Hastings, Clerk of the Spalding Urban District Council.
- Geoffrey Alan Hawthorn, Immigration Inspector, Harwich, Home Office.
- Leonora Constance Hayne, BEM, County Organiser, West Kent, Women's Voluntary Services.
- John Arthur Hayward, Superintendent Safety Officer, John Laing & Son Ltd.
- Archibald Henderson. For political and public services in South Shields.
- John Raymond Henshaw, Honorary Organiser, Stockport Blood Transfusion Service.
- Johnie Friend Herdman, Member, Cumberland Agricultural Executive Committee.
- George Bertram Hill, Chief Clerk, National Debt Office.
- George William Hill, Superintendent Marine Engineer, Associated Humber Lines Ltd.
- Una Alice Himson. For political services in Norwich.
- Eric William Hobbis, Senior Experimental Officer, Long Ashton Research Station, Bristol, Agricultural Research Council.
- William Edward Hollins, Senior Architect, Department of Health for Scotland.
- Ernest Renaud Hooper, Chief Inspector, Saunders-Roe (Anglesey) Ltd.
- Janet Lilian Horn, Higher Executive Officer, Ministry of Agriculture, Fisheries and Food.
- James Thomas Horton, JP, Chief Civil Defence Warden, Fulham, London.
- Thomas Alfred Hough, Works Manager, The D.P. Battery Co. Ltd., Derbyshire.
- Maurice Geoffrey Housego, Information Officer, London Airport, Ministry of Transport and Civil Aviation.
- Hubert Howells, Senior Health Physicist, Windscale Works, Atomic Energy Authority.
- William Howlett, District Secretary, South Western District, National Union of General and Municipal Workers.
- Albert Charles Hughes, Agency and Inter-line Manager, British Overseas Airways Corporation.
- Peter Gerald Hunt, Press Officer, Scottish Information Office.
- Sidney Irwin, Clerical Officer, Headquarters, Northern Command, York, War Office.
- Leslie Charles Victor Jeffery, Higher Executive Officer, Board of Trade.
- Carl Denham Jenkins, Chairman, Disabled Sailors' and Soldiers' Workshops, Bournemouth.
- Bryn John, Chairman, Caerphilly Urban District Council.
- Thomas Meredith John, Head Postmaster, Pontefract and Castleford, Yorkshire.
- John Walter Jones, Chairman, Neath Borough Local Savings Committee, Glamorganshire.
- William Thomas Jones, General Secretary, Coal Trade Benevolent Association.
- Edward Edmund Kemp, Curator of the Royal Botanic Garden, Edinburgh, Ministry of Works.
- Andrew Kennedy, Higher Executive Officer, Ministry of Pensions and National Insurance.
- Douglas Hamilton Kerr, Agricultural Adviser for Uist and Barra, North of Scotland College of Agriculture.
- George William King, Chief Draughtsman, Outfit Department, Furness Shipbuilding Co. Ltd.
- Joan Faye Sendall King, Probation Officer, Essex.
- Wallace James Knight. For political services in Dover.
- Edith Lamprey. For services to the British Legion, Women's Section, in Wales.
- Archibald Lewis Lane, Leading Draughtsman (Engine Drawing Office), Messrs. Cammell Laird & Co. (Shipbuilders & Engineers) Ltd., Birkenhead.
- Mary Angell Lane. For services as psychiatric social worker, The Maudsley Hospital, Denmark Hill, London. (Now at Hammersmith Hospital.)
- Charles Henry Lewis, Area Engineer, Telephone Manager's Office, Bristol, General Post Office.
- Norman Peter Lewis, Head of Cabinet Section, Admiralty.
- Percy Alfred Lewis, Area Chief Engineer, South Western Division, National Coal Board.
- Hersey Lineham, Supervisor of Housing Managers, Church Commissioners.
- Helena Louise Long, Director, Women's and Girls' Division, Central After Care Association.
- Betty Katie Sarah Loosely, Clerical Officer, Admiralty.
- Percival Ernest Mabb. Lately Deputy General Secretary, Royal Naval Benevolent Trust.
- James McCoy, Northern Ireland Area Secretary and National Organiser, National Association of Operative Plasterers.
- George Duff McGlashan, Senior Assistant Engine Works Manager, Alexander Stephen and Sons Ltd., Glasgow.
- Harry McGuffey. Attached War Office.
- Halcrow McHattie, Higher Executive Officer, Scottish Education Department.
- The Reverend Patrick Hugh Robson Mackay, JP, Chairman, West Lothian Youth Employment Committee.
- Walter McKeown, Assistant Divisional Officer, Northern Ireland Fire Authority.
- Arthur Nicholson McKie, Senior Executive Engineer, War Office.
- Ernest William McMillan, Chief Welfare Officer, General Post Office.
- John Kevin Maguire, Deputy Principal, Ministry of Education for Northern Ireland.
- Wilfred Henry George Mann. Lately Member, Rayleigh Urban District Council.
- Gwendoline Dorothy Rosanna Marshall, Headmistress, North Town County Infants School, Taunton.
- Jack Laurence Martin, lately Clerical Officer, Offices of the House of Lords.
- James Martin, Civil Defence Officer, Aberdeen County.
- John Harold Martin, Higher Clerical Officer, HM Treasury.
- Charles Percy Mason, JP. For political and public services in West Sussex.
- George Albert Henry Matthews. For political and public services in Gloucester.
- Nellie Matthews. Lately Deputy District Superintendent, London District, St. John Ambulance Brigade.
- Alderman Albert Ernest Maxey, JP, Chairman of Committee, No. 1228 (Louth) Squadron, Air Training Corps.
- Hannah Metcalfe, lately Assistant Teacher, Penley Voluntary Aided School, Flintshire.
- Paul Mifsud, Assistant Quantity Surveyor, Malta, War Office.
- Gladys Emily Miller. For hospital and other voluntary services in Pontefract.
- Arthur George Mitchell, Senior Museum Assistant, Victoria & Albert Museum.
- William Henry Mitchell, Experimental Officer, Royal Radar Establishment, Ministry of Supply.
- Kathleen Mary Moon, Executive Officer, Foreign Office.
- Ronald Moon, Divisional Officer, Glamorgan Fire Brigade.
- John Houghton Moore, Welfare Officer, British Overseas Airways Corporation.
- John Barlas Morrison, Secretary, Royal Scottish Academy of Music.
- Robert Sydney Morrow, Inspector of Taxes (Higher Grade), Board of Inland Revenue.
- John William Mortimore, lately Branch Manager, Cable & Wireless Ltd., Cyprus.
- Cecil James Murden, Chief Officer, Lincolnshire (Kesteven) Fire Brigade.
- William Jack Newman, Senior Foreman of the Yard, Admiralty.
- Nora Bertha Maud Newton, Secretary, Rural Industries Loan Fund Ltd.
- Donald George Nicholson, Inspector of Taxes (Higher Grade), Board of Inland Revenue.
- Harry Herbert Nicholson, Duty Editor, External Services News Department, British Broadcasting Corporation.
- Sydney Charles Northcott, Vice-Chairman, Grimsby District Advisory Committee, North Midland Regional Board for Industry.
- John Norton. For services as Chairman, Clun District Committee, Shropshire Agricultural Executive Committee.
- Richard Albert Burton Oakley, Surveyor of Lifeboats, Royal National Lifeboat Institution.
- Hugh O'Neill, Senior Executive Officer, Charity Commission.
- Alice Constance Owens, Principal, Liverpool School of Occupational Therapy.
- Harold William Pack, Grade 3 Officer, Ministry of Labour and National Service.
- Captain John Watson Pacy, Master, MV Avonwood, Constantine Lines, Middlesbrough.
- Colin Foulger Page, Inspector of Taxes (Higher Grade), Board of Inland Revenue.
- Harold Elliott Page, Higher Executive Officer, Ministry of Health.
- Gladys Lilian Parker. For political and public services in Eastbourne.
- William Henry Parker, Chief Chemist, British Sugar Corporation.
- Margaret Helen Parrott, Matron, Balmedie Eventide Home, Aberdeen.
- John Osmund Peacock, HM Inspector of Factories, Class IA, Ministry of Labour and National Service.
- Edward Mortimer Pearson, Chief Officer, Dewsbury Fire Brigade.
- Ethel Vera Pemberton. For services to youth in Ingatestone, Essex.
- Ivy Percival, Ward Sister, Salford Royal Hospital.
- Thomas David Perry, Senior Experimental Officer, Royal Mint.
- Beatrice Amy Phipps. In charge of Headquarters Registries, Navy, Army, and Air Force Institutes.
- Frederick William John Pickering, Chief Accountant, British Legion.
- Maud Marjory Pickering, JP, County Borough Organiser, Smethwick, Women's Voluntary Services.
- Richard John Pocock, Surveyor, Port Talbot, Board of Customs and Excise.
- Nora Potter, Honorary Organiser and Secretary, Federation of Sussex Industries.
- Winifred Mabel Poulton, Honorary Secretary, Wanstead and Woodford Local Savings Committee.
- Thomas Powell, Member, Herefordshire War Pensions Committee.
- William Powell. Lately Senior Executive Officer, Royal Ordnance Factory, Patricroft, Ministry of Supply.
- William Thomas Powell, Architect, Ministry of Works.
- Walter Ronald Price, Information Officer, Central Office of Information.
- Bruce Pringle, Manager of Motor Engineers, British Thomson-Houston Co. Ltd., Rugby.
- Francis Albert Pryor, Executive Officer, Foreign Office.
- Ivy Alexandra Punt, Chief Superintendent of Typists, HM Stationery Office.
- William Frederick Quinnell, Examiner of Dockyard Work, Admiralty.
- Margaret Wallace Ramsay, Supervisor of Home Helps, County of Ayr.
- Irene Sarah Ramsey, Secretary, Industrial Co-Partnership Association.
- Gilda Helena Rawlinson, Chairman, Islington Schools Savings Sub-Committee.
- Frank Edward Rawnsley, lately Secretary, The West Yorkshire Regimental Association.
- Francis Edmund Rees, Superintendent, Imperial Lighthouse Service, Colombo.
- George Reid, JP, lately Works Manager, Scottish Oils Ltd., Uphall.
- John Edmund Rich, Children's Programmes Organiser, Television, British Broadcasting Corporation.
- Thomas William Richards, Honorary Secretary, Colwyn Rural District Savings Committee, Radnorshire.
- Alderman Stanley Samuel Riddle, Vice-Chairman, Hastings Local Employment Committee.
- Joyce Eileen Riley, Welfare Worker, Gurkha Depot, Lehra, India.
- Augustus Alphonso Roberts, MB, ChB, Member of Leeds Medical Board, Ministry of Labour and National Service.
- Marion Iris Robinson, Canteen Manageress, Atomic Weapons Research Establishment, Aldermaston.
- Alexander Rodger, Electrical Manager, William Denny & Brothers Ltd., Dumbarton.
- Ernest Stanley Rodgers, Senior Executive Officer, Export Credits Guarantee Department.
- Charles Harry Rogers. For political services in Merton and Morden.
- Ralph Edgell Rogers, Chief Superintendent, Metropolitan Police Force.
- Alexander Lilly Rogerson, Chief Superintendent and Deputy Chief Constable, Stirling and Clackmannan Police Force.
- Matilda Rowe. For political services in Worcester.
- Captain Archibald Rowlands, lately Master of HM Emigrant Ship Captain Hobson, P. Henderson & Co.
- Albert Samuel Royse. For political and public services in Farnworth.
- Florence Mary Ruston. For political and public services in Lewisham.
- Joseph George Ryall, Grade 4 Officer, Branch B, Foreign Office.
- James Ryding, Deputy Director of Stamping, Board of Inland Revenue.
- Rosina Maude Sangston, Secretary, The Royal Soldiers' Daughters' School.
- Michael Joseph Saunders, LM, LRCP(I). For medical services to HM Borstal Institution, Portland.
- Fred Scholefield, Technical Adviser on Dyestuffs, Association of British Chemical Manufacturers.
- Charles George Russell Sewell, Higher Executive Officer, Commonwealth Relations Office.
- Stanley Shaw, Welfare and Safety Officer, George Kent Ltd., Luton.
- Frederick George Sheldon, District Commissioner, North Wiltshire, Boy Scouts Association.
- Charlotte Mary Sherriff. For political services in Edinburgh.
- Christine Mary Sheryer, lately Executive Officer, Royal Ordnance Factory, Woolwich, Ministry of Supply.
- William Eaton Simpson. For political services in Oxford.
- James Alexander Walker Sinclair, Chief Designer, Brown Brothers & Co. Ltd., Edinburgh.
- Thomas George Sinclair, Higher Executive Officer, Ministry of Transport and Civil Aviation.
- Alice Mary Smith. For political services in Scotland.
- Francis Hughes Smith, Director of Optical Design, C. Baker Instruments Ltd., Croydon.
- Sydney Guy Frederick Coast-Smith. For political and public services.
- William Smith, Divisional Education Officer at Fleetwood, Lancashire Local Education Authority.
- Ernest Speirs, Senior Executive Officer, Ministry of Pensions and National Insurance.
- Lowingham Sproat, Operating Officer, North Eastern Region, British Railways.
- John Michael Stamper, Honorary Secretary, Hull Productivity Committee.
- Percy William Stephen, Chief Executive Officer, Board of Trade.
- Alfred George Stickland, Chairman', Alton and District Savings Committee, Hampshire.
- Eric Childe Stonehouse, JP, Chairman of Committee, No. 127 (Wakefield) Squadron, Air Training Corps.
- Marshall Richardson Stonehouse, Chief Clerk, Swansea County Court and District Registry of the High Court, Supreme Court of Judicature.
- Eileen Mary Stott, Controller of Typists, Ministry of Transport and Civil Aviation.
- John William Herbert Strange, Chief Officer, Flintshire Fire Brigade.
- Harry Sumner. For political and public services in Manchester.
- Ethel Louisa Swann. For political and public services in Essex.
- Captain Ernest Sweet, Managing Clerk, Territorial and Auxiliary Forces Association, County of Cornwall.
- Philip Wallis Swindells, Deputy Chief Heavy Haulage Manager, Pickfords Division, British Road Services Board of Management.
- Miriam May Tachon, Matron, St. Monica's Boarding Home for Diabetic Children, Deal, Kent.
- Charles Reginald Talbot, Chief Civil Defence Warden, Nottingham.
- Jesse Horace Taylor, Secretary and Finance Officer, Godalming, Milford and Liphook Group Hospital Management Committee.
- Mary Taylor, Matron, Whitecross Homes (Warrington County Borough) and Whitecross Hospital.
- William Horace Taylor, Higher Executive Officer, Ministry of Pensions and National Insurance.
- Frederick Horace Temple, Senior Executive Officer, Ministry of Education.
- Harriette Aline Tennant. For political and public services in the West Riding of Yorkshire.
- Geoffrey Hinchcliff Theobald, Drainage Engineer, Ministry of Agriculture, Fisheries and Food.
- Isabelle Janet Thom, Women's Voluntary Services Welfare Worker, Gurkha Depot, Singapore.
- Elsie Maria Thomas. For political and public services in Caerphilly.
- Fred Thomas, Higher Executive Officer, Air Ministry.
- Edmund Charles Thompson, Model Designer, Ministry of Housing and Local Government.
- Ivy Winifred Tonge, County Borough Organiser, Southampton, Women's Voluntary Services.
- Violet Powell Townend, Secretary to Chief Labour Officer, Imperial Chemical Industries Ltd.
- Stanley James Treen, Assistant Manager, Distribution Department, Shell-Mex and BP Ltd.
- Margaret Henderson Turpie, Senior Executive Officer, Ministry of Power.
- Joseph Uren, Headmaster, British Families Education Service School, Berlin, War Office.
- Observer Lieutenant Arthur Henry Vear, Duty Controller, No. 14 Group, Royal Observer Corps.
- Herbert Harry Vincent, Senior Executive Officer, Government Communications Headquarters.
- John Henry Wadley, Higher Executive Officer, Air Ministry.
- Agnes Wake, Alderman, Whitley Bay Borough Council.
- Neil Walker, Senior Executive Engineer, Engineer-in-Chief's Office, General Post Office.
- Eunice Wall, Senior District Nurse Midwife, Clevedon, Somerset.
- Robert Foulis Walls, District Manager, North of Scotland Hydro-Electric Board, Orkney.
- John Henry Walsh, MM, JP, Chairman, Lurgan Rural District Council, County Armagh.
- Henry William Ward, Clerk of Works, Office of the Receiver for the Metropolitan Police District.
- Emma Elizabeth Warrington, Matron, Metropolitan Police Nursing Home.
- Squadron Leader Henry Lyons Webb, Secretary, Northern Ireland Area, Royal Air Forces Association.
- Edward John Weller, Executive Officer, Admiralty.
- Hilda Wheatcroft, Deputy Director, Durham County Community Service Council.
- Frederick William Whiley, Commandant, No. 8 District, Police Training Centre.
- Ben White, Chairman, Grimsby Local Savings Committee.
- Samuel George Whittingham, Senior Executive Officer, Board of Trade.
- Grace Wiggins, Milk Officer, Grade II, Ministry of Agriculture, Fisheries and Food.
- Wilfred Wilkinson, lately Higher Executive Officer, Ministry of Housing and Local Government.
- Edith Wilson, Officer-in-Charge, Headquarters Office, Second Post Office Relief Fund.
- Freda Margaret Winnett, Assistant, Budget and Control Department, British Council.
- Alwyn Oswald Winter, Senior Executive Officer, Ministry of Supply.
- Olive Rosa Winterbottom, Executive Officer, Ministry of Agriculture, Fisheries and Food.
- Albert Bertram Wood, MM, Traffic Superintendent and Station Superintendent, Isle of Man, British European Airways Corporation.
- Colin Bradshaw Wood. For public services in Codnor, Derbyshire.
- Edward Farrington Woods, Assistant to Superintendent Engineer, Lines, British Broadcasting Corporation.
- Denby Charles Woollard, Higher Executive Officer, Ministry of Power.
- Eva Margaret Would, Senior Mental Health Officer, Grimsby County Borough.
- Margaret Wragg, Housing Manager, Crawley Development Corporation.
- Arthur Frederick Wyatt, Higher Executive Officer, Air Ministry.
- Grace Alexandra Wylie, JP, Organiser, Large Burgh of Greenock, Women's Voluntary Services.
- Thomas Douglas Youl, Assistant Principal Clerk, Board of Inland Revenue.
- Ellis George Bloor, British Vice-Consul, Geneva.
- Kathleen Mary Boyes, British subject resident in Brazil.
- Samuel Lewis Burgess, Manager, State Electricity Department, Qatar.
- Hazel Dorothy Emily Christy, Shorthand-Typist, Her Majesty's Embassy, Mexico City.
- Annie Clay, lately British Vice-Consul, Shanghai.
- Ivor Davies, lately Communications Officer, Her Majesty's Embassy, Djakarta.
- Gertrude Madeleine Grafton, Personal Assistant to Her Majesty's Ambassador, Kabul.
- Joseph Salim Hatoum, Head of Palestine Paying Centre, Her Majesty's Embassy, Beirut.
- Mary Katharine Hawkins, Matron, Children's Wing, National T.B. Santorium Masan, Korea.
- Sydney Francis Hodge, Manager, International Aeradio Ltd., Sharjah.
- Vincent Bancroft Clifton Janniere, MM, British subject resident in Panama.
- Vincent Hubert Charles Jarrett, Editor of Press Summary, Her Majesty's Embassy, Oslo.
- Shoa Menahem Joseph, British subject resident in Eritrea.
- John Eric Kirsch, British subject resident in Belgium.
- Michael Lee, Regional Information Department, Office of the Commissioner-General for the United Kingdom in South-East Asia, Singapore.
- Hugh John Legg, MC, lately Her Majesty's Consul, Zurich.
- Dorothy Margaret MacLean, lately British Pro-Consul, Macao.
- Cyril Maplethorp, British subject resident in France.
- Kathleen Florence March, Personal Assistant to Naval Attaché, Her Majesty's Embassy, Buenos Aires.
- Antoin Zareh Minassian, British Pro-Consul, Baghdad.
- Malcolm James Tisdale Nicholson, Second Secretary, Her Majesty's Embassy, Washington.
- George William Redvers Robinson, Communications Officer, Her Majesty's Embassy, Washington.
- Francis Augustus Rodrigues, British Pro-Consul, Djakarta.
- Frederick Nicholson Soulsby, British Consul and Information Officer, Frankfurt.
- John Alan Stewart, Head Master, Markham College, Lima.
- Albury Herbert Tatum, lately British Vice-Consul, Truxillo.
- William Watson, Commercial Attaché, Her Majesty's Embassy, Lisbon.
- Dorothea Nancy Rose Webster, Head Mistress of the Community School, Amman.
- James Cedric Arkell, of Indooroopilly, State of Queensland. For services to the Bush Children's Health Scheme.
- Harold Ernest Wilton Braund, MC, a member of the United, Kingdom community in Rawalpindi, Pakistan.
- Grace Johnston Browne, MB, ChM, Director of Maternal and Baby Welfare, Department of Public Health, State of New South Wales.
- Mabel Lucy Chesterfield. For services to the Organisation in the State of Victoria of the Woman's Christian Temperance Union.
- Phyllis Owen Crompton. For services to the Red Cross in the State of South Australia.
- Grace Davy, of Proserpine, State of Queensland. For charitable services.
- William John Dooley, of Williamstown, State of Victoria. For services to charitable movements.
- Stanley James Dunkley, Town Clerk of the City of Maitland, State of New South Wales.
- Maurice Stephens Fisher, a journalist in the State of South Australia.
- John Foster, formerly Cost Accounts Officer, Pakistan Navy.
- Doris Fowler, of Bulawayo, Southern Rhodesia. For services to women's organisations.
- Margaret Greatrex, President of the Federation of Women's Institutes of Southern Rhodesia.
- Laurel Louise Hoffmann. For social welfare services in the Tanunda District, State of South Australia.
- Dorothy Constance Howells, President of the Federation of Mothers' Clubs, State of Victoria.
- Chief Mopeli Jonathan, District of Leribe, Basutoland.
- William Hubbard Kidd, Senior, Chairman of the Widgee Shire Council, State of Queensland.
- Norman Edmund Muchamore Knight, lately Foreman of Factory, Pakistan Naval Armament Depot, Karachi.
- Donald Hugh Knox, Superintendent of Police, Federation of Malaya.
- Chief Matlere Lerotholi, of the Mokhotlong District, Basutoland.
- Mary Ellen McCarthy, Matron, Townsville General Hospital, State of Queensland.
- Audrie Lillian McLeod, Honorary Superintendent of the Spastic Centre, Sydney, State of New South Wales.
- Alfred Ernest McMicken, Honorary Secretary of the Library Association, State of Victoria.
- Monica May Barton Mitchell, a member of the United Kingdom community in India.
- Edith Maria Johanna Opperman, a Nursing Sister in the Public Health Department, City of Salisbury, Southern Rhodesia.
- Mabel Audrey Packham, of Smithton, State of Tasmania. For social welfare services.
- Arthur Parkinson, MB, BS. For services to the community in the West Coast mining centres, State of Tasmania.
- William Watt Addison Phillips, lately Adviser on Maldivian affairs with the Royal Air Force on Gan Island.
- Edward Charles Pender Phillott, Chairman, Winton Shire Council, State of Queensland.
- Charles Felix Pollard, of Wodonga, State of Victoria. For services to the local community.
- Vernon Barnes Pope, Revenue Officer, Bulawayo, Southern Rhodesia.
- Dorothy Ross, formerly Headmistress of the Church of England Girls' School, Melbourne, State of Victoria.
- Leo Cardwell Ross, Native Commissioner, Department of Native Affairs, Southern Rhodesia.
- William Ivor Shipley, an architect in the Public Works Department, Federation of Malaya.
- Harry Gilbert Shorters, Superintendent of Prisons, Kuala Lumpur, Federation of Malaya.
- Percival James Skerman, Senior Lecturer in Agriculture at the University of the State of Queensland.
- Catherine Smith, Matron, Salvation Army Girls Home, Ipoh, Federation of Malaya.
- Phoebe Elizabeth Smyth. For services to the United Kingdom community in Bombay, India.
- Albert Yuba Solomon. For social welfare services, especially on behalf of ex-servicemen, in the State of South Australia.
- Hugh Richard Myrddin Storey, an Administrative Officer in the Malayan Civil Service.
- Carl Alfred Thiele, JP, of Adelaide, State of South Australia. For public services.
- Ingvald Johan Titlestad, Agricultural and Livestock Officer, Agricultural Department, Bechuanaland Protectorate.
- Ella Sinclair Wood. For services to the Nursing Profession in the State of South Australia.
- Vincent Charles Burghart Wright. For services to literature and journalism in the State of New South Wales.
- Maud Marion Yeats. For social welfare services in Basutoland.
- Mallam Bulama Abagana, Health Superintendent, Northern Region, Nigeria.
- Edwin Emmanuel Abraham, Assistant Secretary, Ministry of Agriculture and Lands, Mauritius.
- Kofoworola Aina, Lady Ademola. For public services in Western Region, Nigeria.
- Basil Clifford Akehurst, Agricultural Officer, Department of Agriculture, Tanganyika.
- Ali Akilu, Administrative Officer, Class IV, Northern Region, Nigeria.
- Samuel Olu Akinjobi. For services to Civil Aviation in the Federation of Nigeria.
- Dorothy Isabel Allan, Superintendent of Prisons, Uganda.
- Benjamin Olisa Eluka Amobi, Igwe of Ogidi, Eastern Region, Nigeria.
- David Lewtas Cordue Anderson, Regional Director, British Council, Enugu, Eastern Region, Nigeria.
- Wilton Sylvester Ashley, Superintendent of Police, Jamaica.
- Walter Baker, Clerk of Works, Lands and Works Department, Gibraltar.
- Boey Khye Leng, Assistant Controller of Posts, Singapore.
- Eileen Margaret Boswell, Headmistress, Alexandra Junior School (Army), Gillman Barracks, Singapore.
- Ursula Mary Bozman, Temporary Woman Education Officer, Northern Region, Nigeria.
- Evan Percy Bradley, Assistant Secretary, Agricultural Department, British Honduras.
- Dorothy Amphlett Brewster. For public services in Uganda.
- Robert Fraser Broadway, JP. For public services in St. Helena.
- Victor Sylvester Brookes. For public services in the Leeward Islands.
- Chief Chikowi, Zomba District, Nyasaland.
- Doston Clarke, Government Printer, Trinidad.
- Ilisoni Cokanasiga, Livestock Officer, Department of Agriculture, Fiji.
- John Black Templer Cowan, Senior Superintendent of Prisons, Kenya.
- Mary Cuzner, Superintendent, Malta Memorial District Nursing Association
- Abel Olu Diribe, Administrative Officer (Assistant Secretary), Eastern Region, Nigeria.
- Thomas Dwyer, Senior Executive Officer, Crown Agents for Oversea Governments and Administrations.
- Ee Lai Watt, Assistant Treasurer, Sarawak.
- Felix Adebowale Erinoso, lately Principal Accountant, Nigeria Coal Corporation.
- Theodore Francis Farrell, Supervisor of Elections, Trinidad.
- Jose Socorro Taumaturgo Ferrao, Office Superintendent, Grade II, Kenya.
- Rose Fleuret, Nursing Sister, Falkland Islands.
- Fong Peng Loi, Senior Supervisor, Posts and Telegraphs, North Borneo.
- Walter Frank Harcourt Freeman. For public services in Fiji.
- Fred Fuller. For public services in the Northern Region, Nigeria.
- Sidney Leonard Gauntlett, MB, BS, Medical Superintendent, Chikankata Salvation Army Hospital, Northern Rhodesia.
- Iain Allen Grant Gillies, Administrative Officer, Class I, Cyprus.
- Helen Glennie. For public services in Kenya.
- Ella Koblo, Madame Gulama, Paramount Chief, Kaiyamba Chiefdom, Sierra Leone.
- Elizabeth Halls, Sister Supervisor, Diocesan Maternity Services, Niger Diocese, Nigeria.
- Harry Harvey, Acting Fire Superintendent, East African Railways and Harbours Administration, East Africa High Commission.
- Fritz Percy Duncan Hay. For public services in Cyprus.
- George Dudley Hayes. For public services in Nyasaland.
- Kenneth Donald Fordham Heath, Confidential Secretary, Government House, Somaliland Protectorate.
- The Reverend Thomas Harlington Hield. For public services in the Bahamas.
- Captain Henry Hughes, Senior Superintendent, Medical Field Units, Northern Region, Nigeria.
- Mallam Ibrahim, Waziri of Gumel, Councillor, Gumel Native Administration, Northern Region, Nigeria.
- John Adayemi Ige, Meteorological Superintendent, Federation of Nigeria.
- Eileen Elizabeth Jackson, Temporary District Officer, Nairobi, Kenya.
- Adeluola Okanlawon Karunwi, Senior Auditor, Western Region, Nigeria.
- Kasina s/o Ndoo, BEM, Senior Chief, Special Grade B, Kenya.
- Lieutenant-Colonel John Kiggell, MC, Assistant to the Commissioner for Northern Rhodesia.
- Robert Granville Ojumiri King, Ministerial Secretary, Sierra Leone.
- Clifton Thomas Large, Assistant Registrar of Co-operatives, Hong Kong.
- Li Po-Kwai. For public services in Hong Kong.
- Lim Yong Liang. For services to sport in Singapore.
- Alexander Mabaleka, Assistant Master, African Education Department, Northern Rhodesia.
- William Macdonald, lately Principal, Colby School of Agriculture and Veterinary Science, Nyasaland.
- Sadanand Maharaj, JP. For public services in Fiji.
- Mahmood bin Abdul Wahab, Sergeant-at-Arms, Legislative Assembly, Singapore.
- Muhammadu Mamudu, District Head, Ringim District, Northern Region, Nigeria.
- Evelyn Mancham. For public services in the Seychelles.
- Melville Crowther Marke. For public services in Sierra Leone.
- Richard William Henry Maynard, Senior Executive Officer, Class I, Hong Kong.
- Francis Menezes, Office Superintendent, Aden.
- Andreas Panayi Mikellides, MB, Mental Specialist, Cyprus.
- Anthony Beecroft Moore, Administrative Officer, Class III, Tanganyika.
- Emmanuel Mutesasira Musoke. For public services in Uganda.
- August Ndoro, President, Kilimanjaro Native Co-operative Union Limited, Moshi, Tanganyika.
- George Greenley Nellist. For public services in Malta.
- Arthur James Newman, MC, lately Principal, Mico Training College, Jamaica.
- Hosea Nkojo, Katikiro to the Toro Native Government, Uganda.
- Mohamed Issah Noah. For public services in Sierra Leone.
- Daniel Osagiede Odigie, Senior Registrar, Judicial Department, Western Region, Eastern Region, Nigeria.
- Reverend Sylvanus Nwoha Okoli. For public services in the Eastern Region, Nigeria.
- Akibu Jaiyesimi Abudu Olufawo, Senior Executive Officer, Western Region, Nigeria.
- Joseph Reynold O'Neal, JP. For public services in the Leeward Islands.
- Arthur Somerset Outerbridge, Senior Customs Officer, Bermuda.
- Manibhai Bhailalbai Patel, Pensions Officer, Treasury, Kenya.
- Manubhai Gordhanbhai Patel. For services to sport in Uganda.
- Lucie Sawa Pavlou, Matron, Kyperounda Sanatorium, Cyprus.
- Leonard Pinshow. For public services in Northern Rhodesia.
- George William Robins, Senior Executive Engineer, East African Posts and Telecommunications Administration, East Africa High Commission.
- Joyce Lilieth Robinson, Director, Jamaica Library Service, Jamaica.
- Sylvia Margaret Rogers, Cypher Officer, Tanganyika.
- Cecil Tranter Rose, Chief Waterworks Superintendent, Federation of Nigeria.
- Robert Cammish Rowntree, Works Manager, Public Works Department, Gambia.
- Violet Rudder, Health Visitor, East African Institute for Medical Research, East Africa High Commission.
- Thomas Emanuel Ryan, Education Officer, Leeward Islands.
- Mohammed Salih Hussein Audhali, Rais, Government Guards, Aden.
- Arthur Horace Sanham, Superintendent, Johore Works Water Department, City Council of Singapore.
- Madelonette Eloise Skekel Savory, Senior Woman Secretary, Public Works Department, British Guiana.
- Harold Edwin Scott. For public services in Jamaica.
- David Leslie William Sheldrick. For public services in Kenya.
- Ibrahim Sidki, Assistant Conservator of Forests, Class I, Cyprus.
- Alex John Smith, District Officer, Northern Rhodesia.
- Letty Stuart, Principal, Freetown Secondary School for Girls, Sierra Leone.
- Kenneth John Swann, Assistant Representative, British Council, Malta.
- Olga lanthe Symmonds, JP. For public services in Barbados.
- Robert Watson Taylor, Manager, Motor Transport Depot, Public Works Department, Tanganyika.
- Norman Bowen Thomas, Engineer, Crown Agents for Oversea Governments and Administrations.
- Robert Edward George Trembath, Airport Manager, Hargeisa, Somaliland Protectorate.
- Olive Walke (Mrs. Hercules). For public services in Trinidad.
- Clarice Mary Whitelock, Chief Typist, Land and Agricultural Bank of Kenya.
- Marie Louise Jeanne Wiehe. For public services in Mauritius.
- Wong Kara Cheung. For services to the St. John Ambulance Brigade in Hong Kong.
- Edgar Redvers Wright. For public services in Northern Rhodesia.
- Lancelot Asgil Wynn, Assistant Works Manager, Ministry of Works and Transport, Western Region, Nigeria.
- Edward James Yeomans, Government Printer, Aden.
- Erukana Kisaja Zabuliwo, Education Officer, Uganda.
- Sospater Kalokora Zahoro. For public services in Tanganyika.

=== Order of the Companions of Honour (CH) ===
- The Right Honourable Walter Nash, Prime Minister of New Zealand.

=== Companion of the Imperial Service Order (ISO) ===
Home Civil Service

- Stanley Arthur Ashmore. Lately Senior Principal Scientific Officer, Government Chemist Department. (London S.E.22.)
- Edgar Arthur Beaton, Chief Executive Officer, Board of Customs and Excise. (London S.W.16.)
- Leonard Henry Callard, Senior Chief Executive Officer, Home Office. (London S.W.18.)
- William Clarkson, OBE, Chief Executive Officer, Commonwealth Relations Office. (Redhill.)
- John Rupert Dutton, Commissioner, National Savings Committee. (North Shields.)
- Trevor William Franks, Superintending Engineer, Ministry of Works. (Seaview, Isle of Wight.)
- Albert Edward Gilby, Grade 2 Officer, Ministry of Labour and National Service. (Harrow.)
- George Edward Hance, OBE, Grade 1A Officer, Branch B, Foreign Office. (Bexley.)
- Frank Hemingway, Chief Executive Officer, Board of Trade. (Leeds.)
- William George Hillary James, Chief Executive Officer, War Office. (London N.21.)
- William Howard Jennings, Chief Executive Officer, Ministry of Health. (Maidenhead.)
- Cyril Jowsey, OBE, Assistant Director (Executive), Admiralty. (London S.W.14.)
- John Francis Larcombe, Chief Executive Officer, Ministry of Education. (Pinner.)
- Howard Louis McConnell. Lately Chief Veterinary Officer, Ministry of Agriculture for Northern Ireland. (Helen's Bay, Co. Down.)
- Christopher Jonathan Pridmore, OBE, Principal, Air Ministry. (Andover.)
- William McAllister Ramsay, Finance Officer and Accountant, Department of Agriculture for Scotland. (Edinburgh.)
- Henry Royston, Chief Executive Officer, Ministry of Pensions and National Insurance. (London S.E.3.)
- Arthur Sanders, MBE, Senior Chief Executive Officer, Ministry of Supply. (Reading.)
- Leslie Roland Sankey, Principal, Ministry of Agriculture, Fisheries and Food. (Belmont.)
- Henry Albert Saunders, Chief Executive Officer, National Assistance Board. (London W.S.)
- Sydney George Smith, Chief Executive Officer, War Damage Commission. (West Wickham.)
- William Augustine Squires, Deputy Director of Audit, Exchequer and Audit Department. (Sanderstead.)
- Charles Sidney Stammers, Chief Executive Officer, Ministry of Power. (Coulsdon.)
- John Myrtle Stevenson, Principal, Board of Inland Revenue. (Hatch End.)
- John Allardice Wilson. Lately Controller, Investigation Branch, General Post Office. (Wembley.)

State of South Australia and Southern Rhodesia

- Ivor Gwynn Cockcroft, MBE, Native Commissioner at Binga, Department of Native Affairs, Southern Rhodesia.
- Andrew Caldwell Wilson, Assistant General Manager, Marine and Harbors Board, State of South Australia.

Overseas Civil Service

- Humphrey Darrell Tupper-Carey, Senior Forest Estate Officer, Northern Region, Nigeria.
- William Richard Kingdom Collings, Assistant Director of Marine (Ship Surveys), Hong Kong.
- Ainsley Leverell Dopwell, Accountant General, Grenada, Windward Islands.
- Augustin Roger Harvais, Accountant General, Mauritius.
- Noel Frederick de Berrett Holtz. Lately Under-Secretary, Ministry of Finance, Jamaica.
- Thomas Henry Manning, Comptroller of Posts and Telecommunications, British Solomon Islands Protectorate.
- Anton Francis Skerl, Assistant Commissioner for Mines, Tanganyika.
- Richard Wicks Stephens, Director of Posts and Telegraphs, North Borneo.
- Major George Graham Thomson, MC, Road Service Authority, Nyasaland.

=== British Empire Medal (BEM) ===
Military Division

Royal Navy

- Chief Petty Officer Writer John Edward Ahearn, P/MX 60789.
- Chief Radio Electrician Joseph Allen, W999286, Royal Naval Reserve.
- Chief Petty Officer Douglas Richard Armitage, D/JX 745226.
- Engine Room Artificer 2nd Class Robert Frederick Arnot, D/MX 704112.
- Chief Petty Officer Edwin Banks, DSM, C/JX 125265.
- Chief Wren Writer Elizabeth Isobel Boyd, 14041, Women's Royal Naval Service.
- Quartermaster Sergeant Frederick William Danson, Ch.X 2210, Royal Marines.
- Chief Petty Officer Steward Thomas George Dorrington, D/L 14709.
- Chief Wren (Welfare) Elsie Elizabeth Garbutt, 6937, Women's Royal Naval Service.
- Sergeant Philip Goring, Ply.X 5542, Royal Marines.
- Chief Electrical Artificer Sidney John Hooper, C/MX 49536.
- Chief Petty Officer Godfrey Luke Kent, P/JX 129596.
- Chief Air Fitter (E) Patrick Keohane, L/FX 79743.
- Chief Aircraft Artificer William Noel Leach, L/FX 76905.
- Engine Room Artificer 3rd Class James Bruce Leishman, C/MX 902509.
- Sergeant Herbert John Llewellyn, Po.X 914, Royal Marines.
- Chief Petty Officer Frederick Moore, C/J 929290.
- Able Seaman Raymond Newman, P/J 950585.
- Chief Petty Officer Cook (S) Charles Gerrard O'Neill, D/MX 51601.
- Chief Petty Officer Walter Francis Payne, C/JX 504935.
- Chief Petty Officer George Compton Pert, DSM, P/J 112155.
- Chief Electrician (Air) Reginald Pownall, L/FX 670045.
- Chief Ordnance Artificer Arthur Frederick Reed, D/MX 50892.
- Master-at-Arms Charles Edwin William Rogers, P/MX 801487.
- Chief Engineering Mechanic Albert John Cleverley Ryder, C/KX 97743.
- Acting Chief Radio Electrical Artificer George Maxwell Smith, D/MX 766809.
- Stores Chief Petty Officer (S) William Stanley Thompson, C/MX 59727.
- Chief Mechanician Arthur Sydney Tomlest, P/KX 86811.
- Chief Engine Room Artificer Donald Arthur Turner, C/MX 51788.
- Chief Electrician Herbert Mark Wyartt, C/MX 804989.

Army

- Warrant Officer Second Class Ahamed Ali, Somaliland Scouts.
- Warrant Officer Second Class Mohamed Alin, Somaliland Scouts.
- 6015972 Staff-Sergeant John Barlow, Corps of Royal Engineers, Territorial Army.
- 22532738 Warrant Officer Class II (acting) Joseph Bennett, Corps of Royal Electrical and Mechanical Engineers.
- T/5623468 Sergeant (acting) William Henry Binmore, Royal Army Service Corps.
- 904524 Staff-Sergeant (Artillery Clerk) Valentine Cecil Bird, Royal Regiment of Artillery.
- 10541160 Sergeant (acting) Walter Brandon, Army Catering Corps.
- 2328463 Staff-Sergeant Allan Bullock, Royal Corps of Signals.
- 22530578 Colour-Sergeant Leonard Burrow, The Parachute Regiment, Territorial Army.
- 4272869 Band-Sergeant Ronald Joseph Colclough, The Royal Northumberland Fusiliers.
- LS/3523574 Colour-Sergeant William Collier, The Lancashire Regiment (Prince of Wales's Volunteers).
- 22222602 Staff-Sergeant (acting) Leslie Norman Derek Collins, Royal Corps of Signals.
- LS/4031419 Sergeant Gustavious Donnelly, The King's Shropshire Light Infantry.
- 848002 Sergeant William Wilson Durno, Corps of Royal Military Police.
- 22844578 Corporal Leonard Albert Easter, Royal Corps of Signals.
- 14189878 Sergeant George Alfred Evans, Royal Tank Regiment, Royal Armoured Corps.
- S/14770571 Staff-Sergeant Stanley Evans, Royal Army Service Corps.
- 22775968 Staff-Sergeant Patrick Arthur Fox, Intelligence Corps.
- 858972 Sergeant Arthur Edward Francis, Royal Regiment of Artillery, Territorial Army.
- 835536 Staff-Sergeant (Artillery Clerk) Michael Halpin, Royal Regiment of Artillery.
- 4985925 Staff-Sergeant Francis Joseph Hogan, Royal Corps of Signals.
- 18 Company-Sergeant-Major Samuel Ibemessie, Sierra Leone Medical Services.
- 22566830 Sergeant Samuel Leslie Jago, Royal Regiment of Artillery, Territorial Army.
- 22278619 Sergeant (now Bombardier) Gawn Jamison, Royal Regiment of Artillery, Territorial Army.
- T/99583 Sergeant Benjamin Jennings, Royal Army Service Corps.
- 22259833 Band-Sergeant Edward Herbert Johnson, The Bedfordshire Regiment, Territorial Army.
- 22550470 Staff-Sergeant (acting) Edward Albert George Knight, Corps of Royal Engineers.
- 7597137 Staff-Sergeant John Frederick Lucie, Corps of Royal Electrical and Mechanical Engineers.
- 2320614 Warrant Officer Class II (local) (Band Sergeant-Major) Eric Marsh, Royal Corps of Signals.
- 22521153 Sergeant Cyril Edward Mathias, Corps of Royal Engineers.
- S/22816052 Sergeant Evan Astley Morris, Royal Army Service Corps.
- 14186319 Sergeant Charles George Norman, The Parachute Regiment.
- 29107 Company Quartermaster-Sergeant Holde Numan, The Queen's Own Nigeria Regiment.
- 88194 Sergeant William Jack Norman Peck, Corps of Royal Electrical and Mechanical Engineers.
- 843985 Staff-Sergeant Marcel Christopher Pee, Royal Regiment of Artillery.
- 7393377 Corporal Albert Augustus Phillips, Royal Army Medical Corps.
- 22232220 Warrant Officer Class II (acting) George Henry Pitkin, Army Catering Corps.
- 22262673 Staff-Sergeant (Farrier) Charles Sidney John Ponjeart, Royal Regiment of Artillery.
- 22208127 Warrant Officer Class II (acting) Bernard Francis Price, Royal Regiment of Artillery.
- 892296 Staff-Sergeant (Artillery Clerk) Douglas Ernest Quare, Royal Regiment of Artillery.
- 7885445 Staff-Sergeant Walter Rustage, Royal Tank Regiment, Royal Armoured Corps.
- 296265 Corporal of Horse John Smith, The Life Guards.
- 22238199 Sergeant Geoffrey Frederick Stockham, Royal Corps of Signals.
- S/22822543 Sergeant John Vincent Sykes, Royal Army Service Corps.
- 7882995 Staff-Sergeant (acting) Ernest Stanley Taylor, Corps of Royal Electrical and Mechanical Engineers.
- 905239 Warrant Officer Class II (acting) Leonard Hugh Taylor, Corps of Royal Electrical and Mechanical Engineers.
- 10596488 Staff-Sergeant (acting) John Matthew Thompson, Royal Army Ordnance Corps.
- NA/159204 Regimental Sergeant-Major Godwin Nna Ezenwoko Ugoala, The Queen's Own Nigeria Regiment.
- 17048 Sergeant Isoa Wilfred Vavaitamana, Fiji Military Forces.
- 19054536 Sergeant Jack William Ward, Corps of Royal Engineers.
- 1870688 Warrant Officer Class II (acting) Robert Edward Lionel Wardle, Corps of Royal Engineers.
- 2549621 Staff-Sergeant Donald George Owen White, Royal Corps of Signals.
- W/355319 Staff-Sergeant (acting) Sarah Lily Williams, Women's Royal Army Corps.

Royal Air Force

- 591936 Flight Sergeant Herbert John Barnes.
- 638562 Flight Sergeant James Devenish.
- 1863173 Flight Sergeant Charles Roy Elliot.
- 631679 Flight Sergeant Albert George Evans.
- 617770 Flight Sergeant Harold Fearnhead.
- 627733 Flight Sergeant Edward Donald Forde.
- 795789 Flight Sergeant John Galea, RAF Malta.
- 550826 Flight Sergeant Robert Frank Gillett.
- 894947 Flight Sergeant Catherine Dorothy Hambidge, Women's Royal Air Force.
- 569853 Flight Sergeant James Ernest Lewis.
- 3022888 Flight Sergeant Derek James Manson.
- 551416 Flight Sergeant Ronald Eaton Mason.
- 564366 Flight Sergeant Henry Wilkins Neill.
- 564393 Flight Sergeant Francis Henry Richards.
- 573863 Flight Sergeant Frank Maltby Rodgers.
- 566207 Flight Sergeant Ronald Walter Routley.
- 927729 Flight Sergeant Raymond Augustus Spurgeon.
- 524603 Flight Sergeant Charles Frederick Percival Underwood.
- 571726 Flight Sergeant Nicholas John Warrington.
- 570647 Flight Sergeant Richard Ernest Williams.
- 649751 Chief Technician James Leslie Frame.
- 566938 Chief Technician Alexander John Langlands.
- 3005452 Chief Technician Harold Albert Morgan.
- 622247 Chief Technician Joseph Albert Perris.
- 567994 Chief Technician Peter Allan Sayzeland.
- 4120827 Acting Flight Sergeant John Blaylock.
- 551386 Acting Flight Sergeant Leslie Raymond Harris.
- 538733 Acting Flight Sergeant Richard Lambert.
- 2434668 Acting Flight Sergeant James Sorbie.
- 4030571 Acting Flight Sergeant Ronald Henry James Varndell.
- 777060 Sergeant William Croker.
- 525273 Sergeant William Ronald Curtis.
- 4005905 Sergeant Thomas Doran.
- 3501984 Sergeant Francis Murphy.
- 585271 Sergeant Peter Inglis Parkin.
- 3500482 Sergeant Michael Walter Podmore.
- 632752 Sergeant James Taylor.
- 4113110 Senior Technician John Francis Allen.
- 3501116 Senior Technician Alan Skelton.
- 3504906 Acting Sergeant Peter Stuart Hall.
- 3517984 Acting Sergeant Denis Warmoth.
- 4049890 Corporal Joseph Blair.
- 4118836 Corporal George Thomas Horder.
- 4024749 Corporal John Paul.
- 1921302 Corporal Stuart George Edward Sullivan.

Civil Division

United Kingdom

- Leonard James Abbott, Inspector, Commercial Department, Western Region, British Railways. (London W.3.)
- Arthur Leonard Adams, Chargehand, Marconi's Wireless Telegraph Co. Ltd., Chelmsford.
- Victor Jack Adsett, Foreman Linesman, Southern Electricity Board. (Ryde, Isle of Wight.)
- Mark Edward Allen. For services to the National Sea Training School, Sharpness.
- Thomas Alsford. For services to the Devonshire Regiment Old Comrades Association. (Exeter.)
- Nathan George Andrews, General Foreman, Chelmsford District, Eastern Electricity Board. (Chelmsford.)
- Harold Probyn Ayres, Chief Inspector, Metropolitan Special Constabulary. (Croydon, Surrey.)
- William Edward Bailey, Chief Warden, Civil Defence Corps, Grantham.
- Mabel Dorothy Barker, County Training Officer, South Middlesex, Women's Voluntary Services. (Twickenham.)
- Percival William Barrow, lately Loco Driver, Warwick Power Station, East Midlands Division, Central Electricity Generating Board. (Leamington Spa.)
- Nellie Baxendale, Senior Overlooker, Royal Ordnance Factory, Chorley, Ministry of Supply. (Wigan.)
- Nancy Bellers, Centre Organiser, Axminster, Women's Voluntary Services. (Colyton.)
- Hugh Bennett, Overseer (R), Telegraphs, Head Post Office, Cardiff.
- George Berriman, Leaded Glazier and Cutter, Wainwright & Waring Ltd. (London W.11.)
- Frederick Bignall, Collector, Tilbury Rise No. 3 Savings Group, Nottingham.
- Raymond Alexander Birks, Station Officer, Buckinghamshire Fire Brigade. (Gerrards Cross.)
- Eric Reader Booth, Toolroom Foreman, Moore & Wright (Sheffield) Ltd. (Sheffield.)
- George Bowman, Head Foreman, Harland & Wolff Ltd., Belfast.
- Leslie Samuel Brading, Civilian Warrant Officer, No. 424 (Southampton) Squadron, Air Training Corps. (Southampton.)
- Marguerite Clare Bradley, Collector, Longhope Women's Institute Savings Group, Gloucester.
- Joseph Howey Branch, Supervising Workman, Rising Sun Colliery, Northern (N. & C.) Division, National Coal Board. (Wallsend-on-Tyne.)
- Charles James Brawn, Sergeant, Shropshire Special Constabulary. (Tasley.)
- George Augustus Bredemear, Chef, SS Nevasa, British-India Steam Navigation Company Ltd. (Bournemouth.)
- William John Raworth Brett, Inspector (Special Class Category "B"), Waterloo, Southern Region, British Railways. (London S.W.17.)
- Leslie Arthur Bridle, Bedroom Steward, RMS Queen Elizabeth, Cunard Steam-Ship Co. Ltd. (Southampton.)
- Harry Briggs, Yard Foreman, Dixon Green Depot, North Western Division, National Coal Board. (Manchester.)
- Annie Brough, Member, Women's Voluntary Services, Chesterfield.
- Alfred Charles Butcher, Inspector, North Area, London, General Post Office. (London N.17.)
- Walter Butterworth, Chief Inspector, Lancashire Constabulary. (Ryton-on-Dunsmore.)
- Joseph Dover Buyers, Senior Foreman, Hunting Aircraft Ltd., Luton.
- Alexander Joseph Camilleri, Clerk Grade A, Air Ministry, Malta.
- Robert Andrew Campbell, JP, Sub-District Commandant, Ulster Special Constabulary. (Omagh, County Tyrone.)
- William Campbell, Instructor, Warden Section, Lanarkshire Division, Civil Defence Corps.(Garrowhill.)
- Hugh Carp, Overman, Chatterley-Whitfield Colliery, West Midlands Division, National Coal Board. (Stoke-on-Trent)
- Muriel Daisy Caudwell, Centre Organiser, Abingdon Rural District, Women's Voluntary Services.
- Edgar Chambers, Chargehand Plater, The Tees-side Bridge and Engineering Works Ltd. (Middlesbrough.)
- Harry James Thomas Charlton, Inspector, Woolwich Sub-District Office, General Post Office. (Bexley, Kent.)
- Frederick Chivers, Hall Superintendent, British Museum. (London W.C.I.)
- Harold William Clark, lately Engineering Inspector (Electrical), Port of London Authority. (London S.E.3.)
- Frederick John Collins, MM, Instructor Grade III, RAF College, Cranwell.
- Albert Edward Cook, Established Storehouseman, Royal Naval Armament Depot, Bull Point. (Plymouth.)
- John Cook, Charging Machine Driver, Colvilles Ltd., Scotland. (Cambuslang, near Glasgow.)
- Albert James Coward, Prepayment Meter Collector, Dorset and Bournemouth Region, Southern Gas Board. (Boscombe.)
- Dorothy Evelyn Cox, Manageress, N.A.A.F.I., Hobart Barracks, Detmold, Germany. (Bedford.)
- William Craig, Traffic and Materials Supervisor, J & E Hall Ltd., Glasgow.
- James Crofts, Janitor, Forfar Academy.
- Clara Davis, Cup Maker, General Earthenware Factory, T. G. Green & Co. Ltd. (Burton-on-Trent.)
- Reginald Alfred Sydney Disborough, Technical Works (Engineering and Allied Grades) Grade II, Royal Mint. (Mitcham, Surrey.)
- Albert George Dixon, Chief Motive Power Inspector, Line Traffic Manager's Office, G.N. Line, British Railways. (Enfield, Middlesex.)
- Evelyn Dodds, Convoy Organiser, Food Flying Squad, Hexham, Women's Voluntary Services. (Riding Mill, Northumberland.)
- Marjorie Downing, County Staff, North Middlesex, Women's Voluntary Services. (London N. 14.)
- Alexander Duncan, Office Keeper Grade I, Scottish Home Department. (Edinburgh.)
- Jack Harold Evans, Postal and Telegraph Officer, Electra House, General Post Office. (Redhill, Surrey.)
- Sidney Thomas Evans, Non-Technical Grade II, Storage Depot, Summerfield, Ministry of Supply. (Brinsford, Wolverhampton.)
- Kathleen Mary Fensome, Welfare Section Instructor, Civil Defence Corps, Warwickshire. (Berkswell.)
- Edward Floyd, Operating Room Attendant, Admiralty. (Rainham, Kent.)
- Edwin James Fuller, Head Groundsman, All England Lawn Tennis Club, Wimbledon.
- Albert William Furnival, Instructor, Oxfordshire Division, Civil Defence Corps. (Binfield, Berkshire.)
- Cecil Osbert George, Electrical Foreman, South Wales Transport Co. Ltd. (Swansea.)
- John Gibson, Chargehand Fitter, Blackburn District, North Western Electricity Board. (Blackburn.)
- Henry John Giles, lately Foreman, Mount & Sons Ltd., Canterbury, Kent.
- James Joseph Alf Gough, Head Fitter of Artificial Limbs, J. E. Hanger & Co. Ltd. (Whitton, Middlesex.)
- Raymond Albert Grace, Instrument Maker, EMI Electronics Ltd., Hayes.
- David Lionel Grigg, GM, Sergeant, Metropolitan Police Force. (Bromley, Kent.)
- Robert James Hambrook, Stores Foreman, Command Ordnance Depot, Ashford, War Office.
- Alfred Leonard Harvey, Sub-Postmaster, Clapham Old Town Sub-Post Office, London. (London S.W.4.)
- William Haston, Sub-Officer, Lanarkshire Area Fire Brigade. (Shotts.)
- George Henry Heron, Foreman Fitter, The Middle Docks & Engineering Co. Ltd., South Shields.
- Thomas Sidney Owen Hill, lately Physical Instructor, National Spinal Injuries Centre, Stoke Mandeville Hospital. (South Harrow.)
- William James Hockley, Senior Foreman of Inspections, Metropolitan Water Board. (Ruislip, Middlesex.)
- Constance Winifred Hoggarth, Head Telephone Operator, HM Embassy, Washington.
- Stanley Holland, Colliery Deputy, Six Bells Colliery, South Western Division, National Coal Board. (Abertillery.)
- Henry John Horton, Officers' Mess Steward, School of Infantry, War Office. (Hythe, Kent.)
- Harold Horwood, Chief Supervisor (M), Exeter Telephone Exchange, General Post Office.
- Norman Howard, Mechanic Examiner, North Midland Region, Ministry of Supply. (Llangefni, North Wales.)
- Robert Ernest Howse, Land Service Assistant, Grade II, Ministry of Agriculture, Fisheries and Food. (Maidstone.)
- Fred Hudson, JP, Development Worker, Mansfield Colliery, East Midlands Division, National Coal Board. (Mansfield.)
- Horace Jack Humphreys, Chief Observer, Post 7/H.4, No. 7 Group, Royal Observer Corps. (Northampton.)
- Edward Hunt, Technical Officer, Engineering Department, General Post Office. (Greenford, Middlesex.)
- Enid Sophia Ruth Hunt. For services to homeless children in Huntingdonshire.
- Marjorie Jacob, JP, Centre Organiser, Lichfield, Women's Voluntary Services.
- Joseph Johnson, Overman, Ormonde Colliery, East Midlands Division, National Coal Board. (Nottingham.)
- William John Johnston, Head Messenger and Office Keeper, National Assistance Board for Northern Ireland. (Belfast.)
- Walter Jones, Steelworker, John Summers & Sons Ltd., Shotton, Flintshire.
- William Henry Jose, General Foreman, South Western Electricity Board. (Camborne, Cornwall.)
- James Terence Kelly, Senior Marine Survey Assistant (Launchman), Newcastle, Ministry of Transport and Civil Aviation. (Gateshead.)
- Tom Kerrigan, Plater, The Greenock Dockyard Company Ltd., Greenock.
- Winifred Kilner. Collector, Oxford Road Savings Group, Middlesbrough.
- Sarah Ann Kilpatrick, Weaver, Thomas Ferguson & Co. Ltd., Edenderry, Banbridge, County Down.
- John Kirkham, Chargehand Process Worker Grade II, Royal Ordnance Factory, Irvine, Ministry of Supply. (Kilmarnock.)
- Mary Lawton, Divisional Superintendent, Spalding, St. John Ambulance Brigade. (Crowland, Lincolnshire.)
- Leung Nai Poon, Assistant Compradore, HM Dockyard, Hong Kong.
- John Lindley, lately Works Foreman, Dukinfield Undertaking, North Cheshire Group, North Western Gas Board. (Hyde, Cheshire.)
- James Gibb Livie, Superintendent to the Trustees of the Harbour of Dundee.
- Lok Shing, No. 1 Electrical Fitter, HM Dockyard, Hong Kong.
- Low Bing Shue, No. 1 Sailmaker, HM Dockyard, Hong Kong.
- Pamela Joy Loweth, Welfare Section Instructor, Civil Defence Corps, Surrey. (Guildford.)
- John Harry Lowther, Transport Driver, Yorkshire Electricity Board. (Leeds.)
- Robert McBride, Engineering Superintendent, The Scottish Stamping & Engineering Co. Ltd., Ayr.
- James McCallum, Foreman Rigger, William Denny & Bros. Ltd., Dumbarton.
- Charles Henry Mackenzie, Process Foreman, Fabrication of Titanium, Imperial Chemical Industries Ltd. (Swansea.)
- Robert Charles Gordon Mackenzie, Postman (Rural), Head Post Office, Grantown-on-Spey, Morayshire.
- Jane McKinstry, Collector, Works Savings Group, Eglinton Bakery Ltd., Belfast. (Carnmoney, County Antrim.)
- Charles Alexander McMillan, Technical Class Grade II, Royal Ordnance Factory, Birtley, Ministry of Supply. (Glasgow.)
- Douglas Patrick McVeigh, Commandant, Somerset/19 Detachment, British Red Cross Society. (Yeovil, Somerset.)
- Alexander Mair, Able Seaman, MS Cardiffbrook," Comben Longstaff & Co. Ltd. (Seaton Delaval, Northumberland.)
- Elsie Norah Maker, Chief Supervisor, Directory Enquiry Bureau, Terminus Telephone Exchange, General Post Office. (London S.W.19.)
- Dudley Raeburn Marsden, Assistant Divisional Officer, Birmingham Fire Brigade.
- Charles William Marsh, Inspector (Postal), Head Post Office, Kettering.
- George Miles, Mains Foreman, East Midlands Electricity Board. (Ilkeston, Derbyshire.)
- Herbert Miller, Foreman Driver, War Office, Malta.
- Thomas Henry Millicent, Chargehand, Atomic Weapons Research Establishment, Aldermaston. (Basingstoke.)
- Margaret Ellen Moreland, Assistant Supervisor, Coleraine Telephone Exchange, General Post Office.
- James Morrison, Station Officer, Northern Area Fire Brigade, Isle of Lewis. (Stornoway.)
- Sydney Adolphus Nairne, MM, Head Chancery Messenger, HM Embassy, Havana.
- John Neeld, Tool Maker, C.A.V. Ltd., Acton. (North Harrow.)
- George Alfred Newby, Head Foreman Ship-wright, J. S. Doig (Grimsby) Ltd., Grimsby.
- Reginald Francis Newns, Mechanic-in-Charge 1A, Post Office Garage, Newcastle upon Tyne.
- George Richard Thomas Norris, Superintendent, Northampton County Borough Special Constabulary.
- Edgar North, Underground Repairer, Barley Hall Colliery, North Eastern Division, National Coal Board. (Chapeltown, near Sheffield.)
- Alfred Nye, Chargeman of Shipwrights, HM Dockyard, Rosyth.
- Winifred Oliver, Centre Organiser, Guisborough Urban District, Women's Voluntary Services.
- Frederick Samuel Wallace Parker. For services to the Royal Naval Volunteer (Wireless) Reserve Southend Unit. (Leigh-on-Sea, Essex.)
- Cissie May Patmore, Supervisor. Bishop's Stortford Telephone Exchange, General Post Office. (Stansted, Essex.)
- George William Pearce, JP, Storeman, City West Depot (Surveyors), Ministry of Works. (Mitcham, Surrey.)
- Moses Perks, Colliery Mechanical Engineer, Hilton Main Colliery, West Midlands Division, National Coal Board. (Westcroft, near Wolverhampton.)
- Vera Francis Petchey, Chief Observer, Operations Centre, No. 5 Group, Royal Observer Corps. (Watford.)
- Rosa Plumbley, Collector, Street Savings Group, Itchen, Southampton.
- Robert Kime Shaw Porter, Station Officer, Andover Fire Brigade, Hampshire.
- Elsie Pritchard, Collector, Street Savings Group, Uckfield, Sussex.
- Fadel Saeed Quassim, Head Chowkidar, RAF Khormaksar.
- Kenneth William Rawe, Civil Defence Liaison Officer for Plumpton Rural District Council. (Plymstock.)
- John Reston, Senior Overman, Whitrigg Colliery, Scottish Division, National Coal Board. (Whitburn.)
- Reginald Rosser, Foreman, Wales and Monmouthshire Industrial Estates Ltd. (Treforest.)
- Raymond Douglas Naylor Rushen, Land Service Assistant, Grade III, Ministry of Agriculture, Fisheries and Food. (Chelmsford.)
- William John Sage, Chief Permanent Way Inspector, Stratford, Eastern Region, British Railways. (Tilbury, Essex.)
- William Hewett Sanders, General Foreman, British Museum (Natural History). (London S.W.6.)
- Frederick Arthur Scally, Head Office Keeper, Commonwealth Relations Office. (London E.17.)
- Henry Thomas Scarborough, Civilian Warrant Officer, No. 2048 (Dagenham) Squadron, Air Training Corps. (Ilford, Essex.)
- Maurice Arthur Searle, Chief Inspector, War Department Constabulary, War Office. (Aldershot.)
- Walter Tom Shipway, Mains and Service Inspector, Swindon District, South Western Gas Board. (Swindon.)
- Robert Sim, Foreman Jointer, South of Scotland Electricity Board. (Hamilton.)
- Kynymond Edwin Spurrel Simmons, General Foreman, Bartrey Board Co. Ltd., Essex. (Colchester.)
- Albert Edward Slater, Leading Chargehand Carpenter, Command Ordnance Depot, Branston, War Office. (Burton-on-Trent.)
- George Henry Smedley, Underground Worker, Hucknall Colliery, East Midlands Division, National Coal Board. (Hucknall.)
- Arthur Ernest Smith, Technical Officer, Telephone Manager's Office, Cambridge, General Post Office.
- Cyril Wickings-Smith, Chief Warden, Civil Defence Corps, Bedford.
- Arthur Snell, Telephone Operator, No. 1 Works Area, Grantham, Air Ministry.
- Violet Blanche Solloway, Collector, Roberts Row and Palace Row Savings Group, Abertillery.
- Frederick Thomas Southwell, Storekeeper, RMS Capetown Castle, Union-Castle Mail Steamship Co. Ltd. (Southampton.)
- Maggie Sparrow, First Aid Attendant, No. 14 Maintenance Unit, Carlisle, Air Ministry.
- Alexander Starrett, Head Constable, Royal Ulster Constabulary. (Armagh.)
- Herbert Stocking, Stoker-in-Charge, Wissington Sugar Factory, British Sugar Corporation. (Norfolk.)
- Daniel Patrick Sullivan, Garage Foreman, Diplomatic Wireless Service, Foreign Office. (Wolverton, Buckinghamshire.)
- William Arthur Taft, Chief Officer, Class I, HM Borstal, Hollesley Bay Colony. (Woodbridge, Suffolk.)
- Frederick George Thomas, Chief Instructor, Cardiff Government Training Centre, Ministry of Labour and National Service. (Swansea.)
- Tiong, Ah Hai, Chargehand Rigger, HM Boom Defence and Salvage Depot, Singapore.
- Jack Topper, lately Manager, Histon pig herds, Cambridge.
- Leonard Varley, Works Superintendent, Kidderminster District, West Midlands Gas Board.
- Francis William Vass, Head Gardener, Abbeville, Imperial War Graves Commission.
- Dorothy Louise Wager, Seamstress (Special), Armament Research and Development Establishment, Ministry of Supply. (London S.E.18.)
- Thomas Walker, Gas Fitter, Bridge Street Depot, Leeds, North Eastern Gas Board.
- Frederick George Walton, Leading Technical Officer, City Telephone Area, General Post Office. (London E.C.1.)
- William Henry Ward (Senior), Technical Officer, Telephone Manager's Office, Liverpool, General Post Office. (Wallasey, Cheshire.)
- Victor George Wiles, Foreman Operator, Pests Department, Huntingdon Division, Ministry of Agriculture, Fisheries and Food. (Sandy, Bedfordshire.)
- Jessie Williams, Collector, Street Savings Groups, Leigh-on-Sea, Essex.
- William Williamson, First-aid Demonstrator, St. Andrew's Ambulance Association, Edinburgh.
- Frank Mintrum Woodford, Pumpman, Esso Cheyenne, Esso Petroleum Co. Ltd. (Southampton.)
- Edward Charles Woods, Senior Assistant (Scientific), Hydraulics Research Station, Department of Scientific and Industrial Research. (Wallingford, Berkshire.)
- Arthur William Enoch Wright, Lairage Foreman, British Railways, Fishguard. (Goodwick, Pembrokeshire.)
- Wu Chun Sang, Local Clerk, Grade "A", Admiralty, Hong Kong.

Basutoland

- Ntseke Jonathan Molapo, Administrative Assistant, Department of Agriculture, Basutoland.
- Joel Moteki Sekamane, Higher Grade Works Staff, Public Works Department, Basutoland.

Pakistan

  - Frank White, Assistant Foreman of Factories, Pakistan Navy Armament Depot, Karachi.

Overseas Territories

- Hussein Dervish, Mukhtar of Kandou, Cyprus.
- Antigone Georghiadou, Teacher and Assistant, St. Barnabas School for the Blind, Cyprus.
- Xenophon Ioannou, Chief Foreman, Department of Public Works, Cyprus.
- Andranik Karoglanian, Inspector of Works, Water Department, Cyprus.
- John Michaelides, Postal Officer, 3rd Grade, Cyprus.
- Mehmed Emin Mehmed Salih, lately Mukhtar, Sinda, Cyprus.
- Mehmet Remzi Tahir, Mukhtar of Ayios Andronikos, Cyprus.
- Kitwara s/o Irinje, Fisheries Assistant, Lake Victoria Fisheries Service, Mwanza, East Africa High Commission.
- Alikade s/o Musoke, Station Master Grade VII, Mityana, Uganda, East African Railways and Harbours Administration.
- Minnie Magdeline Jacqueline Roberts, Telephonist Grade I, East African Posts and Telecommunications Administration.
- Wong Chak Sang, Male Charge Nurse, Medical Department, Hong Kong.
- Gachunji Kanyarati, Principal Officer, Grade I, Thompsons Falls Prison, Kenya.
- Evanson Thiongo s/o Macharia, Tribal Policeman, 1st Grade, Limuru, Kenya.
- Laurent Ongoma s/o Makokha, Senior Chief, Kenya.
- Louvina Carey, Supervisor, Public Health Nurses, Nevis, Leeward Islands.
- Joseph Edokayoba Anoha, Senior Trade Instructor, Prisons Department, Federation of Nigeria.
- Edward Iduorobo Ogedegbe, Agricultural Assistant, Grade I, West African Institute of Oil Palm Research, Federation of Nigeria.
- Agu Mkpa, Agricultural Supervisor, Department of Agriculture, Eastern Region of Nigeria.
- David Madandola Durojaiye, 2nd Class Technical Assistant, Ministry of Agriculture, Northern Region of Nigeria.
- Frederick Luma, Ranger, Forest Department, Western Region, Nigeria.
- Datu Jinurain, Native Chief, Grade II, Lahad Datu District, North Borneo.
- Tham Yat Sang, Capitan China, Kota Belud, North Borneo.
- Sumama Sumaili, Head Court Messenger, Fort Johnston District, Nyasaland.
- Harry Derek Clifford, Charge Nurse, Mental Hospital, St. Helena.
- Robert du Buisson, Technical Officer, Agricultural Department, Seychelles.
- Bockari Mongbama Gbolie, Health Superintendent, Kono District, Sierra Leone.
- Eusope bin Ahmad, Tug Serang Grade I, Wharf Superintendent's Department, Singapore Harbour Board.
- Abdallah Hemed, Liwali of Kilwa Kivinje and the Coast, Tanganyika.
- Joseph Remedio Luis Lobo, lately Clerk, Game and Fisheries Department, Uganda.
- Frederick David Murdoch, Senior Foreman of Works, Gilbert and Ellice Islands Colony, Western Pacific.
- Edward Arnold Trotter, Chief Mechanic, Public Works Department, Windward Islands.

=== Royal Victorian Medal (RVM) ===
In Silver

- Stanley Albert Edward Ashton.
- Alfred Arthur Betteridge.
- Chief Petty Officer Charles Henry Bickley, P/LX 21082.
- Police Constable Cyril John Blyth, Metropolitan Police.
- Stanley William Childs.
- Alexander Fraser.
- Robert Harold George Godfrey.
- 630391 Chief Technician Albert Charles Hadley, Royal Air Force.
- Henry Charles Harmsworth.
- Edith Holmes.
- Divisional Sergeant-Major Sidney James Oxford, DCM, Her Majesty's Bodyguard of The Yeoman of the Guard.
- Chief Engine Room Artificer George Harry Rolls, P/MX 49955.
- 586672 Corporal Technician Michael John White, Royal Air Force.
- Ernest Edward Woore.

=== Royal Red Cross (RRC) ===
- Joan Mary Woodgate, ARRC, Principal Matron, Queen Alexandra's Royal Naval Nursing Service.
- Lieutenant-Colonel Gwendolen Mary Willoughby, (206530), Queen Alexandra's Royal Army Nursing Corps.
- Wing Officer Veronica Margaret Ashworth, ARRC, (405076), Princess Mary's Royal Air Force Nursing Service.

==== Associate of the Royal Red Cross (ARRC) ====
- Petty Officer Wren Sick Berth Kathleen Emily Ada Funnell, 108330, Women's Royal Naval Service.
- Major Joyce Barbara Chambers, (206076), Queen Alexandra's Royal Army Nursing Corps.
- Captain Dorothy Carl Gatenby, (392099), Queen Alexandra's Royal Army Nursing Corps.
- Flight Officer Patricia Carney, (406709), Princess Mary's Royal Air Force Nursing Service.

=== Air Force Cross (AFC) ===
Royal Navy

- Lieutenant-Commander Daniel Patrick Norman.

Royal Air Force

- Group Captain David Foster Dennis, DSO, DFC.
- Wing Commander Herbert George Slade, (123239).
- Squadron Leader George Michael Bailey, (180527).
- Squadron Leader Christopher Michael Bruce, (2260080).
- Squadron Leader Philip Jacobus Lagesen, DFC, (502146).
- Squadron Leader Roland Wharrier Richardson, (113339).
- Squadron Leader Sidney Walker, (181180).
- Squadron Leader Allen Ernest George Woods, (164603).
- Flight Lieutenant Allan Montague Bezzant, (4055760).
- Flight Lieutenant John Edward Connolly, (179240).
- Flight Lieutenant John Victor Cordery, (203484).
- Flight Lieutenant Ivor Davies, (190234).
- Flight Lieutenant Arthur John Fellows, (195530).
- Flight Lieutenant Robert Thornton Jones, (172453).
- Flight Lieutenant Robert Eyre Mackie, DFC, (502075).
- Flight Lieutenant Sinclair O'Connor, DFC, AFM, (1077386).
- Flight Lieutenant David Rankin Scott, DFC, (157309).
- Flight Lieutenant Charles Taylor, (4076381).
- Flight Lieutenant Terry Calthorp Taylor, (2517027).
- Flight Lieutenant Derek Hubert Wales, (102292).
- Flight Lieutenant John Raymond Weeds, DFC, (119824).
- Flying Officer Harry Stanley Bray, (4160480).
- Master Pilot Jan Rogers, (794907).
- Master Pilot Cyril Munro Ward, (1321215).
- Master Navigator Brinley Phillips, (638951).

Bar to Air Force Cross

- Wing Commander Colin Weall Coulthard, AFC, (104469).
- Wing Commander Geoffrey Howard Dhenin, AFC, GM, MA, MD, (138384).
- Acting Wing Commander Clifford Alan Sullings, AFC, (172750).
- Squadron Leader Ronald Albert Edward Allen, AFC, (187693).

Second Bar to Air Force Cross

- Group Captain Hugh Patrick Ruffell Smith, AFC, MA, MB.

=== Air Force Medal (AFM) ===
Royal Air Force

- 582745 Flight Sergeant Stanley William Austin.
- 2205548 Flight Sergeant Laurence Christian.
- 3500390 Flight Sergeant Sidney William Kenneth Woskett.
- 4008785 Sergeant Thomas Gavin.
- 1910773 Sergeant Thomas Moloney.

=== Queen's Commendation for Valuable Service in the Air ===
Army

- Major Richard James Parker, MC (303686), Royal Regiment of Artillery; permanently attached Army Air Corps.

Royal Air Force

- Acting Wing Commander John Darral Ackerman, MBE (58785).
- Squadron Leader Desmond Joseph Gordon (199923).
- Squadron Leader Michael Jones (119566).
- Squadron Leader Deryk Arthur Maddox (180382).
- Squadron Leader Donald Trench Skeen (162157).
- Squadron Leader Reginald James Spiers (607056).
- Squadron Leader Foster Malcolm Neill Taplin (59237).
- Squadron Leader Anthony Desmond Jeens Williams (131152).
- Flight Lieutenant Andrew McFarlane Adams (57007).
- Flight Lieutenant Dennis Allison (585081).
- Flight Lieutenant Alan John Biltcliffe (579310).
- Flight Lieutenant Anthony William Francis Burge (53498).
- Flight Lieutenant Ronald William Cozens, DFC (170216).
- Flight Lieutenant Arthur Frank Easto (168195).
- Flight Lieutenant Norman Henry Giffin (607248).
- Flight Lieutenant Philip James Goodall (2425514).
- Flight Lieutenant Frederick Michael Haynes (2472109).
- Flight Lieutenant John Frederick George Howe (503984).
- Flight Lieutenant James Alfred Kinver (160830).
- Flight Lieutenant Brunon Jerzy Kudrewicz, AFC (501903).
- Flight Lieutenant Miroslav Lastovka (139568).
- Flight Lieutenant Donald McClen (4065528).
- Flight Lieutenant William Brian Colin Morgan (4031735).
- Flight Lieutenant Reginald Trevor Ponting (55442).
- Flight Lieutenant Anthony Edgar Radnor (2513091).
- Flight Lieutenant Dennis John Read (4123924).
- Flight Lieutenant Colin Geoffrey Richardson (607497).
- Flight Lieutenant John Deryck Rowell (2324762).
- Flight Lieutenant Vernon Reginald Rust (3110011).
- Flight Lieutenant Alfred Charles Shape (175080).
- Flight Lieutenant Robert William Smith, DFM (131882).
- Flight Lieutenant Peter David George Terry (203299).
- Flying Officer Maurice Burdett (175309).
- Flying Officer Wilfred George Gregory (1588009).
- Flying Officer Stuart Burleigh Mead (3507910).
- Flying Officer Clarence Richard Talbot Mottershead (1233910).
- Flying Officer Gordon Cyril Timewell (1459573).
- Pilot Officer Tadeusz Peter Antoniak (706548).
- Pilot Officer Peter George Vanhinsbergh (1652082).
- 4034144 Flight Sergeant Kenneth Frederick Norman.
- 4175683 Acting Corporal George Henderson.

United Kingdom

- Walter Richardson, Flight Navigating Officer, British Overseas Airways Corporation.
- Ronald Smith, Flight Engineer Officer, British Overseas Airways Corporation.

=== Queen's Police Medal (QPM) ===
England and Wales

- Captain John Murray Rymer-Jones, CBE, MC, Assistant Commissioner, Metropolitan Police.
- William George Symmons, Chief Constable, St Helens Borough Police.
- William Tait, Chief Constable, Sunderland Borough Police.
- James Edward Cotton, Chief Constable, Rotherham Borough Police.
- Arthur Richard George White, Assistant Chief Constable, Somerset Constabulary.
- Horatio John Bentley, Assistant Chief Constable, Cheshire Constabulary.
- Clarence Lambie McDonough, GM, Chief Superintendent, Metropolitan Police.
- Sydney William Smith, Chief Superintendent, Birmingham City Police.
- Ronald Douglas Clapp, Superintendent, West Sussex Constabulary.
- James Alexander Skinner, BEM, Superintendent and Deputy Chief Constable, Grimsby Borough Police.
- Ernest Albert Rossiter, Superintendent, Dorset Constabulary.
- Arthur Robert Pitcher, Superintendent (Grade I), Metropolitan Police.

Scotland

- Alexander Brown, Superintendent, City of Glasgow Police.
- John Morren Dow, Chief Superintendent, Edinburgh City Police.

Northern Ireland

- Arthur Irvine, Head Constable, Royal Ulster Constabulary.

State of New South Wales

- Roy McClelland, Superintendent 3rd Class, New South Wales Police Force.
- Norman Henry Newton, Superintendent 3rd Class, New South Wales Police Force.
- John Henry Dogan, Superintendent 3rd Class, New South Wales Police Force.
- John Joseph Agnew, Inspector 1st Class, New South Wales Police Force.
- John Stephen Brown, Inspector 1st Class, New South Wales Police Force.
- William Henry Flood, Inspector 1st Class, New South Wales Police Force.

Southern Rhodesia

- Basil Joseph Price, Senior Assistant Commissioner, British South Africa Police.

Overseas Territories

- Ronald Audley Stoute, Commissioner of Police, Barbados.
- John Thomas Hodgkinson, Senior Superintendent of Police, Kenya.
- Abdus Salam Ebun Agbabiaka, MBE, Assistant Commissioner of Police, Nigeria.
- Thomas Robinson Pallet, Deputy Commissioner of Police, Nigeria.
- Lawson Augustine Hicks, Assistant Commissioner of Police, Northern Rhodesia.
- Anthony Sheriff Keeling, OBE, Deputy Commissioner of Police, Sierra Leone.

=== Queen's Fire Services Medal (QFSM) ===
England and Wales

- Harry Judge, Chief Officer, West Riding of Yorkshire Fire Brigade.
- Fred Henry James Danniells, Divisional Officer (Deputy Chief Officer), Plymouth Fire Brigade.
- Leslie Allinson, Chief Officer, Sunderland Fire Brigade.
- Thomas Harcourt Nunns, Divisional Officer (Deputy Chief Officer), Newport (Monmouthshire) Fire Brigade.
- Henry Radford Lucas, Superintendent, Ministry of Transport and Civil Aviation Fire Service Training School, Cardiff.

Scotland

- John Craig, MBE, Divisional Officer, Western Area Fire Brigade.

Overseas Territories

- Joseph Thomas Atkinson, Chief Fire Officer, British Guiana.

=== Colonial Police Medal (CPM) ===
Southern Rhodesia

- Anthony Lawry Andrew, Superintendent, British South Africa Police.
- Maurice Bernard Buckley, Inspector, British South Africa Police.
- Elias, Station Sergeant, British South Africa Police.
- Jiri, Detective Station Sergeant, British South Africa Police.
- Cyril Anthony Schollum, Detective Chief Inspector, British South Africa Police.
- Takaruza, 1st Class Sergeant, British South Africa Police.
- Laurence Herbert Turner, Superintendent, British South Africa Police.
- Basil Francis Horatio Wright, Staff Chief Inspector, British South Africa Police.

Basutoland

- Kenneth Edward Shortt Smith, Superintendent, Basutoland Mounted Police.

Bechuanaland Protectorate

- Thomas John Dent, Assistant Superintendent, Bechuanaland Protectorate Police Force.
- Adam Thogo Mogatle, Sergeant Major, Bechuanaland Protectorate Police Force.

Overseas Territories

- Musa Abdulla, Chief Inspector, Somaliland Police Force.
- Jilo Aden, Assistant Inspector, Kenya Police Force.
- Joseph Adeola, Deputy Superintendent, Nigeria Police Force.
- Shatir Ahmad, Inspector, Grade I, Kenya Police Force.
- Ali bin Mohamed, Sub-Inspector, Singapore Police Force.
- William Pearson Apps, Chief Inspector, Hong Kong Police Force.
- Joshua Roger Barber, Assistant Superintendent, Northern Rhodesia Police Force.
- Andrew Norman Barkley, Superintendent, Tanganyika Police Force.
- Peter Vivian Birch, Senior Superintendent, Sierra Leone Police Force.
- Paul Redman Blyth, Superintendent, Northern Rhodesia Police Force.
- John Brian Boulton, Superintendent, Kenya Police Force.
- John Patrick Bray, Superintendent, Gambia Police Force.
- Eric Norman Godfrey North Brend, Superintendent, Tanganyika Police Force.
- William John Cannon, Superintendent, Tanganyika Police Force.
- Chan Lap, Staff Sergeant, Class II, Hong Kong Police Force.
- Phillip Alexander Charles, Inspector, St. Vincent Police Force.
- Patrick Okwudi Chude, Senior Superintendent, Nigeria Police Force.
- Dowding Stuart Cozier, Senior Superintendent, Trinidad Police Force.
- Christopher Ralph Crawford, Assistant Superintendent, Nigeria Police Force.
- William Duncan Gumming, Assistant Superintendent, Kenya Police Force.
- Ernest Dover, Deputy Superintendent, Nigeria Police Force.
- Wilfred Arthur Farmer, Deputy Commissioner, Barbados Police Force.
- Thomas Francis Flynn, Superintendent, Singapore Police Force.
- Albert Nathaniel Foster, Sergeant, Grade I, Jamaica Police Force.
- Abdul Hamid Marican, Sub-Inspector, Singapore Police Force.
- Thomas Arthur Handford, Chief of Police, British Solomon Islands Protectorate.
- Ho Cheung, Sergeant, Hong Kong Police Force.
- Hu Hung-Cheung, Inspector, Hong Kong Police Force.
- Jagjit Singh, Detective Staff Sergeant, Singapore Police Force.
- Ali Kaid Ali, Assistant Superintendent, Aden Police Force.
- Abdul Hamid Khan, Superintendent, Tanganyika Police Force.
- Ali Liban, Sergeant Major, Somaliland Police Force.
- Samuel Majiyagbe, Sub-Inspector, Nigeria Police Force.
- Rupert Vincent Major, Chief Inspector, Trinidad Police Force.
- John Marshall, Inspector, Bermuda Police Force.
- Akuila Matanibukaca, Sub-Inspector, Fiji Police Force.
- David Gordon Mathers, Assistant Superintendent, Aden Police Force.
- Mohamed bin Ismail, Ambulance Attendant, Singapore Fire Brigade.
- Musa Muhini, Inspector, Grade II, Kenya Police Force.
- Ereiza Dungu Mukasa, Inspector, Uganda Police Force.
- Peter Mucheusi Mutoka, Inspector, Grade II, Kenya Police Force.
- Neta, Detective Assistant Inspector, Northern Rhodesia Police Force.
- Mordecai Nneji, Sub-Inspector, Nigeria Police Force.
- William Nyrenda, Sergeant Major, Tanganyika Police Force.
- Sidney Mba Odukwe, Sub-Inspector, Nigeria Police Force.
- Henry Oni-Okpaku, MBE, Senior Pay and Quartermaster, Nigeria Police Force.
- Ong Kian Tiong, Assistant Superintendent, Singapore Police Force.
- Zephaniya Opondo, Head Constable, Uganda Police Force.
- Eugene Kevin Ignatius O'Reilly, Senior Superintendent, Hong Kong Police Force.
- Haralambos Christodoulos Patsalides, Chief Inspector, Cyprus Police Force.
- Ronald David Arthur Price, Assistant Superintendent, Nyasaland Police Force.
- Eleazor Manasseh Proctor, Inspector, Leeward Islands Police Force.
- Anthony Fredrick Rose, Chief Inspector, Hong Kong Police Force.
- Bernard Edward Ruck, GM, Senior Superintendent, Kenya Police Force.
- Yeasa Samura, Sergeant-Major, Sierra Leone Police Force.
- Geoffrey Sawaya, Chief Inspector, Tanganyika Police Force.
- Ramanu Sawyekr, Chief Inspector, Sierra Leone Police Force.
- Proven James Sharpe, Detective Inspector, Cyprus Police Force.
- Walter Stansfield, Assistant Chief Constable, Cyprus Police Force.
- Tan Boon Ann, Section Leader, Singapore Fire Brigade.
- Edgar Theophilus Tonge, Inspector, Leeward Islands Police Force.
- Yeoh bin Chiat, Deputy Superintendent, Singapore Police Force.

== Australia ==
=== Knight Bachelor ===
- Hans Heysen, OBE, of Hahndorf, South Australia, in recognition of his contributions to Australian Art.
- Douglas Frank Hewson Packer, CBE, of Bellevue Hill, New South Wales, for services to journalism, and the newspaper industry.
- Christopher Sheehy, OBE, Chairman, Australian Dairy Produce Board.
- Arthur Harold Tange, CBE, Secretary, Department of External Affairs.

=== Order of the Bath ===
==== Companion of the Order of the Bath (CB) ====
Military Division

- Lieutenant-General Reginald George Pollard, CBE, DSO, (2/14), Australian Staff Corps.

=== Order of Saint Michael and Saint George ===
==== Companion of the Order of St Michael and St George (CMG) ====
- Professor John Philip Baxter, OBE, Chairman, Australian Atomic Energy Commission.
- Archie Montague Carey Buttfield, General Manager, Australian Mutual Provident Society.
- William Labatt Payne, OBE, of New Farm, Queensland. For public services.
- Robert Joseph Webster, CBE, MC, of Clifton Gardens, New South Wales; in recognition of his services to the Australian textile industry.

=== Order of the British Empire ===
==== Knight Commander of the Order of the British Empire (KBE) ====
Civil Division

- Sir (William) John Allison, Chairman, Board of Business Administration, Department of Defence; Chairman, Export Development Council, Department of Trade.
- Walter Eric Bassett, MC, a Consulting Engineer, of Armadale, Victoria. For public services.
- The Honourable Edward Emerton Warren, CMG, of Clifton Gardens, New South Wales. For services to the coal industry.

==== Commander of the Order of the British Empire (CBE) ====
Military Division

- Commodore Patrick Perry, OBE, Royal Australian Navy.
- Major-General William Dudley Refshauge, OBE, (3/37652), Royal Australian Army Medical Corps.
- Group Captain Brian Alexander Eaton, DSO, DFC, Royal Australian Air Force.

Civil Division

- Donald George Anderson, Director-General, Department of Civil Aviation.
- John Gilbert Buckley Castieau, formerly Public Service Arbitrator. For public services.
- John Qualtrough Ewens, OBE, Parliamentary Draftsman, Attorney-General's Department.
- Lieutenant-Colonel Arthur James Lee, MC, Deputy National President, The Returned Sailors' Soldiers' and Airmen's Imperial League of Australia.
- Murray Louis Tyrrell, CVO, Official Secretary to the Governor-General.
- Elizabeth Hornabrook Wilson, MBE, of Tusmore, South Australia. For social welfare service.
- Mary Cecil Tenison Woods, OBE, of Kirribilli, New South Wales. For public services, especially in connection with the United Nations Organisation.

==== Officer of the Order of the British Empire (OBE) ====
Military Division

- Commander Bertrand Lucien Dechaineux, VRD, Royal Australian Naval Reserve.
- Lieutenant-Colonel John Burton Duncan (2/37573), Royal Australian Army Ordnance Corps.
- Lieutenant-Colonel Kenneth David Green (3/117202), Royal Australian Engineers.
- Colonel Alexander Eason Ross (2/78), Australian Staff Corps.
- Lieutenant-Colonel Henry James Trick (2/156281), Royal Australian Signals.
- Group Captain Arthur Dean John Garrisson, Royal Australian Air Force.

Civil Division

- Michael Auld, of Marryatville, South Australia. For services to the wine industry of Australia.
- The Reverend William Alec Fraser, School Chaplain, Scotch College, Melbourne.
- Dorothy Jane Adele Helmrich, President of the Arts Council of Australia.
- John Rupert Wilfred Kennedy, Organising Secretary, Western District Branch, The Returned Sailors' Soldiers' and Airmen's Imperial League of Australia.
- The Reverend Robert Bathurst Lew, ED, Past President-General of the Methodist Church of Australasia.
- Lieutenant-Colonel William Scott Lonnie, MVO, MC, of Daglish, Western Australia. For services on behalf of returned and serving servicemen and women and their dependants.
- Eleanor Manning, Chief Commissioner, Girl Guides Association of Australia.
- Kathleen Anastatia Mylne, JP, of Manby, Queensland. For public and charitable services.
- George Robert Brown Patterson, lately Senior Australian Trade Commissioner in London.
- Councillor John Ross, Holbrook Shire Council, New South Wales. For public services.
- Heatlie Fletcher Gascoigne-Roy, DCM, Deputy Chairman, Repatriation Commission.
- John Lawson Shute, Chairman and Government Representative, Australian Meat Board.
- James Alfred Waterworth Stevenson, formerly Commonwealth Jute Controller and Chairman of the Flax Production Commission. For public services.
- Jessie Sutherland, JP, of Essendon, Victoria. For services rendered in connection with patriotic and charitable movements.
- Lyra Taylor, Administrative Officer, Social Work and Welfare Branch, Department of Social Services.

==== Member of the Order of the British Empire (MBE) ====
Military Division

Royal Australian Navy

- Acting Supply Commander Albert George Burley.

Australian Army

- Lieutenant (Quartermaster) (Honorary Captain) Senley Baxter (1/55), Royal Australian Army Service Corps.
- 3/713 Warrant Officer Class I Lionel Joseph Butler, Royal Australian Engineers.
- Captain (temporary) Neville Whidbe Butler (2/313), Royal Australian Armoured Corps.
- Major Francis Stewart Laurie (4/30353), Royal Australian Army Service Corps.
- Major Thomas Law (5/37932), Royal Australian Engineers.
- Major Charles Frederick Milford (1/28), Australian Staff Corps.
- Major James Thomas Sullivan (3/92036), Royal Australian Infantry.

Royal Australian Air Force

- Acting Squadron Leader James Noel Black (03253).
- Acting Flight Lieutenant John Strangeways Webster (0310564), Citizen Air Force.
- Warrant Officer Peter James Davern (A31984).
- Warrant Officer Walter Stanley Sparkes (A31532).

Civil Division

- Geoffrey Francis Adeney, Senior Master, Royal Australian Naval College.
- Charles Walter William Barlow, Secretary, Taxation Board of Review No. 2.
- Walter Henry Bunning, Reception Officer, Office of the High Commissioner for the Commonwealth of Australia in London.
- Winifred Anderson Carruthers, of Roseville, New South Wales. For services rendered under the auspices of the Young Women's Christian Association of Australia.
- Aileen Mona Chapman, Matron, Scarba Home for Children, Bondi, New South Wales.
- William Cecil Clegg, of South Hurstville, New South Wales. For services to ex-servicemen and women and their dependants.
- Rachel Cleland, of Port Moresby, Territory of Papua-New Guinea. For services to the Girl Guides movement.
- Henry James Cole, formerly Senior Clerk, Department of Civil Aviation.
- Francis Philip Delandro, of Roseville, New South Wales. For services to the automobile industry.
- Eric Elmore Dimsey, formerly Chief Investigation Officer, Income Tax Office, Victoria.
- Andrew James Dowd, of Broken Hill, New South Wales. For services to ex-servicemen and women and their dependants.
- Arthur James Farnworth, Senior Research Officer, Division of Textile Industry, Commonwealth Scientific and Industrial Research Organisation.
- Stella Douzie Gillett, of Mornington, Victoria. For patriotic and charitable services.
- Jean Mary Genevieve Gorry, Matron of the Friendly Societies' Hospital, Casino, New South Wales.
- Cecil Gordon Harper, MRCS, LRCP, a medical practitioner of Woolgoolga, New South Wales.
- Robert Scott Liddell, formerly Command Paymaster, Headquarters South Command, Department of the Army.
- Kevin Edward Lohan, formerly Superintendent, Commercial Branch, Telecommunications Division, Postmaster-General's Department (New South Wales).
- Dorothy Mary Agnes Magee, Senior Matron, Grade II, Repatriation General Hospital, Concord, New South Wales.
- James McNeil Martin, of Mt. Barker, Western Australia. For services to the fruit industry.
- Victor McQuarrie, formerly Clerk, Overseas Section, Income Tax Office, New South Wales.
- William Michael, JP, of Hobart, Tasmania. For patriotic and charitable services.
- Lillian Mitchell, JP, Honorary National Secretary, Girl Guides Association of Australia.
- Alban George Moyes, MC, of Chatswood, New South Wales. For services to sport, particularly cricket.
- Robert Stewart Parker, of Deakin, Australian Capital Territory. For public services.
- Eunice Muriel Harriett Hunt Paten, ARRC, President, College of Nursing, Australia.
- Cyril Laban Sylvester Sibly, formerly Superintendent (Personnel), Postmaster-General's Department (South Australia).
- Annie Elizabeth Stockmin, of Mount Hawthorn, Western Australia. For services to ex-servicemen and women and their dependants.
- William White, Director of Finance (Treasury), Department of Air.

=== Companion of the Imperial Service Order (ISO) ===
Australian Civil Service

- Brigadier Frederick Gallagher Galleghan, DSO, OBE, ED, lately Deputy Director, Commonwealth Investigation Service, Sydney.
- Edward Reginald Toms, lately Assistant Secretary (Administration), Department of Labour and National Service.

=== British Empire Medal (BEM) ===
Military Division

Royal Australian Navy

- Acting Leading Seaman Brian Roach, R 49784.

Australian Army

- 3/3371 Sergeant Ernst Ronald Keith Auchettl, Royal Australian Armoured Corps.
- 1/997 Sergeant Henry Brook, Royal Australian Army Medical Corps.
- F3/13 Sergeant Dolores Ellis, Women's Royal Australian Army Corps.
- 2/45733 Warrant Officer Class II (temporary) John Joseph Henry, Royal Australian Infantry Corps.
- 5/393 Warrant Officer Class II (temporary) William Hugh Jones, Royal Australian Army Service Corps.
- 3/2222 Sergeant Douglas Maxwell Rodgers, Australian Intelligence Corps.
- 2/4839 Warrant Officer Class II (Provisionally) Leslie Arthur Wright, Royal Australian Army Dental Corps.

Royal Australian Air Force

- A13269 Flight Sergeant Joseph George Raymond Golden.
- A2265 Flight Sergeant Phillip James Mulcahy.
- A21124 Sergeant Lawrence Dufty.
- A22945 Corporal Albert Henry Hoy.

Civil Division

- Kateelen Sarah Hester, Monitor, Melbourne Central Exchange, Postmaster-General's Department.
- Carl Leonard Larter, lately Postal Clerk and Telegraphist, Postmaster-General's Department.
- Allan Reginald Nicholls, Foreman, Grade "A", Plant Section, Small Arms Factory, Department of Supply, Lithgow.
- Garnet Selwyn Richards, Line Inspector, Postmaster-General's Department.
- William Charles Selwyn Tompsitt, Principal Attendant, House of Representatives, Canberra.
- George Adamson Webster Trace, Leading Hand Fitter, Williamstown Naval Dockyard, Department of the Navy.

=== Royal Red Cross (RRC) ===
==== Associate of the Royal Red Cross (ARRC) ====
- Major (temporary) Edith Elizabeth Harler (F5/1000), Royal Australian Army Nursing Corps.
- Captain Dorothy Gwendoline Maud Potter (F5/65), Royal Australian Army Nursing Corps.

=== Air Force Cross (AFC) ===
Royal Australian Air Force

- Group Captain Glen Albert Cooper, DFC.
- Wing Commander Vernon Francis Wilfred Sullivan (03107).

=== Queen's Commendation for Valuable Service in the Air ===
Royal Australian Air Force

- Squadron Leader William Noel Nichol (011322).
- Squadron Leader Warren Stickley (022185).

== Ghana ==
=== Order of the British Empire ===
==== Commander of the Order of the British Empire (CBE) ====
Civil Division

- Albert Joseph Hawe, OBE, MD, FRCP, Physician Specialist, Medical Service.

==== Officer of the Order of the British Empire (OBE) ====
Military Division

- Lieutenant-Colonel Ernest George Grave (185459), Royal Army Pay Corps; seconded to the Ghana Army.

Civil Division

- John Thomson Alexander, Information Officer, United Africa Company of Ghana Ltd. For public services.
- David Alexander Anderson, Permanent Secretary, Administrative Service.
- Francis Eric Taylor, Permanent Secretary, Administrative Service.

==== Member of the Order of the British Empire (MBE) ====
Military Division

- Captain George Kenneth Brookes (419824), Royal Army Medical Corps; seconded to the Ghana Army.
- Major Edward Harry Charlton Davies (359551), Royal Regiment of Artillery; seconded to the Ghana Army.
- 2984718 Warrant Officer Class II David Bruce McBain, Army Physical Training Corps; seconded to the Ghana Army.

Civil Division

- Thomas Michael Kennedy, Technical Adviser to Local Authorities in Trans-Volta/Togoland.
- William Peters, formerly Administrative Officer, Class II.
- Dorothy Grace Wilkinson, Lecturer, Winneba Training College, and Training Adviser for the Girl Guide movement in Ghana.

=== British Empire Medal (BEM) ===
Military Division

- 2548447 Staff-Sergeant Albert Telford Cantley, Corps of Royal Engineers; seconded to the Ghana Army.

Civil Division

- Reginald Harbor Mitchell, Senior Works Superintendent, Public Works Department Ghana.

== Federation of Rhodesia and Nyasaland ==
=== Knight Bachelor ===
- Victor Lloyd Robinson, CBE, formerly Attorney General of the Federation.

=== Order of the British Empire ===
==== Commander of the Order of the British Empire (CBE) ====
Civil Division

- Herbert Hugh Cole, formerly Federal Secretary for Education.
- Leo Levy, in recognition of his services to the cattle industry of Southern Rhodesia and the Federation.

==== Officer of the Order of the British Empire (OBE) ====
Civil Division

- Dudley Alexander Lawrence, formerly Director of Veterinary Services, Federal Ministry of Agriculture.
- Bertram Fawcett Garratt Paver. For public services in the Federation of Rhodesia and Nyasaland.
- Cyril Stanton Robertson, District Superintendent, Bulawayo, Rhodesia Railways.

==== Member of the Order of the British Empire (MBE) ====
Military Division

- Major Henry Arthur Oberholster (0055), Rhodesia and Nyasaland Infantry.

Civil Division

- Ivy Arnold, Matron, Bulawayo General Hospital.
- Cora Ethel Jones, in charge of the Cypher Office of the Federal Government.
- Ronald James Liddle, Rhodesia Railways representative in Elizabethville.
- Patrick Henry O'Brien, a Scientific and Technical Officer, Federal Department of Trigonometrical and Topographical Surveys.
- Martha Louis Wallace. For political and social welfare services, mainly in Broken Hill.

=== Companion of the Imperial Service Order (ISO) ===
Federation Of Rhodesia and Nyasaland Civil Service

- John Arthur Kinsey, Consul-General for the Federation at Lourenço Marques.

=== British Empire Medal (BEM) ===
Military Division

- DN. 30484 Warrant Officer Class I Alfred Wyson Kampeny, 1st Battalion, The King's African Rifles.
- NRA. M596 Warrant Officer Class I Lameck Mbewe, 1st Battalion, Northern Rhodesia Regiment.

Civil Division

- Benjamin Charowedza, Ambulance Driver, Ndanga Hospital, Southern Rhodesia.
- Faine Joseph Pambala, Telephone Operator, Nyasaland Railways Telephone Exchange, Limbe.
