= 1947 Birthday Honours =

British government recognitions

The 1947 King's Birthday Honours were appointments by many of the Dominions of King George VI to various orders and honours to reward and highlight good works by citizens of those countries. The appointments were made "on the occasion of the Celebration of His Majesty's Birthday." They were announced in supplements to the London Gazette of 6 June 1947.

The recipients of honours are displayed here as they were styled before their new honour, and arranged by honour, with classes (Knight, Knight Grand Cross, etc.) and then divisions (Military, Civil, etc.) as appropriate.

== United Kingdom and Commonwealth ==
=== Order of the Crown of India ===
- Her Royal Highness Princess Elizabeth Alexandra Mary.
- Her Royal Highness Princess Margaret Rose.

=== Baron ===
- Reginald Douglas Crook. For political and public services.
- Frederick Montague, CBE, MP, Member of Parliament for West Islington, 1923–31, and since 1935. Parliamentary Under-Secretary of State for Air, 1929–31. Parliamentary Secretary, Ministry of Transport, 1940–41, and Ministry of Aircraft Production, 1941–42. For political and public services.
- Sir Arthur Frederick Richards, GCMG, Governor and Commander-in-Chief, Nigeria. For services to the Colonial Empire.
- Sir Roy Lister Robinson, OBE, Chairman, Forestry Commission.

=== Privy Councillor ===
- Sir (William) Norman Birkett, KC (The Hon. Mr. Justice Birkett), a Justice of the High Court of Justice, King's Bench Division.
- The Right Honourable Thomas Sivewright, Baron Catto, CBE, Governor of the Bank of England.
- Ness Edwards, MP, Member of Parliament for Caerphilly since 1939. Parliamentary Secretary, Ministry of Labour and National Service since 1945.
- The Honourable Sir Godfrey Martin Huggins, CH, KCMG, FRCS, Prime Minister of Southern Rhodesia since 1934.
- George Mathers, DL, MP, Member of Parliament for West Edinburgh, 1929–31, and for Linlithgow since 1935. Comptroller of HM Household, 1944–45, and Treasurer, 1945–46. Deputy Chief Whip, 1945–46. Lord High Commissioner to the General Assembly of the Church of Scotland, 1946 and 1947. For political and public services.

=== Knight Bachelor ===
- John Smith Boyd, Permanent Vice-President of the Shipbuilding Employers' Federation.
- Captain Sidney William Clift. For public services in Birmingham and the Midlands.
- John Samuel Dodd, Past President of the Associated British Chambers of Commerce.
- William Norwood East, MD, FRCP. For services to the study of criminal psychology.
- Ifan ab Owen Edwards, Founder of the Welsh League of Youth.
- Ralph Roscoe Enfield, CB, Chief Economic Adviser, Ministry of Agriculture and Fisheries.
- William Russell Flint, RA, President of the Royal Society of Painters in Water Colours.
- Ralph Freeman, MInstCE, Partner in Freeman Fox and Partners, Consulting Civil Engineers.
- Douglas Thornbury Garrett, President of The Law Society.
- Alexander Greig, Director of Retail Co-ordination and Retail Trade Adviser, Ministry of Food.
- David Kennedy Henderson, MD, FRFPSG, FRCP.Ed, Professor of Psychiatry, Edinburgh University.
- Professor Ernest Laurence Kennaway, MD, DSc, FRCP, FRS, lately Director, Chester Beatty Research Institute of the Royal Cancer Hospital, London.
- Russell Kettle, Senior Partner, Deloitte, Plender, Griffiths and Company.
- Major Hew Ross Kilner, MC, Deputy Chairman and Managing Director (Aviation), Vickers-Armstrongs Ltd.
- Alexander McCall, MD, ChB. For public services.
- Andrew McCance, DSc, FRS, Member, Advisory Council to the Committee of the Privy Council for Scientific and Industrial Research.
- Andrew Simpson Macharg, Senior Partner, McClelland Ker and Company, Glasgow.
- Archibald Hector McIndoe, CBE, MS, MSc, FRCS, FACS, Civilian Consultant in Plastic Surgery to the Royal Air Force.
- Greville Simpson Maginness, President of the British Employers' Confederation.
- Charles Johns Mole, MVO, OBE, FRIBA, Director-General of Works, Ministry of Works.
- Laurence Kerr Olivier, Actor. For services to the stage and to films.
- William Peters, CMG, HM Senior Trade Commissioner in the Union of South Africa.
- Professor Arnold Plant. For services to Government Departments.
- Reginald Kaye Rowell, Controller of Death Duties, Board of Inland Revenue.
- Harold Malcolm Watts Sargent, MusD, ARCO, FRCM, Conductor. For services to music.
- Alderman Walter Thompson, DCL, JP. For public services in Newcastle-upon-Tyne.
- Robert Hill Tolerton, CB, CBE, DSO, MC, Under-Secretary, Ministry of Transport.
- Ifor Williams, DLitt, FBA, FSA, Professor of Welsh Language and Literature, University College of North Wales, Bangor.
- Robert Arthur Young, CBE, MD, FRCP, Consulting Physician, Middlesex and Brompton Hospitals.

Dominions

- James Hay Gosse. For public services in the State of South Australia.
- Thomas William Meagher, MB, BS, Lord Mayor of the City of Perth, State of Western Australia, 1939–45. For public services.

India

- The Honourable Mr. Justice Frederick William Gentle, Chief Justice of the High Court of Judicature at Fort St. George, Madras.
- The Honourable Mr. Justice Ronald Evelyn Pollock, Indian Civil Service, Puisne Judge of the High Court of Judicature at Nagpur, Central Provinces and Berar.
- Alfred Charles Turner, CSI, CIE, MBE, Indian Civil Service, Principal Secretary to the Government of India, Finance Department.
- Marmaduke Robert Coburn, CSI, CIE, OBE, Additional Financial Adviser, Military Finance, Government of India.
- The Honourable Mr. Harry Douglas Townend, Member of the Council of State, President, Bengal Chamber of Commerce and Associated Chambers of Commerce.
- Jeffery Fellowes Crofts Reynolds, CIE, MC, General Manager, South Indian Railway, Trichinopoly.
- Brigadier Henry Lawrence Scott, CB, DSO, MC, Major-General in and Chief of the Military Staff, Jammu and Kashmir State Forces.
- Percival Joseph Griffiths, CIE, Member of the Central Legislative Assembly.
- Colonel George Reid McRobert, CIE, Indian Medical Service, Inspector-General of Civil Hospitals, Bihar.
- Trevor Joselyne Matthews, Senior Director of the firm of Grindlays and Company Limited, Bankers and Agents.

Burma

- The Honourable Mr. Justice Reginald Taafe Sharpe, Barrister-at-Law, Puisne Judge of the High Court of Judicature at Rangoon.

Colonies, Protectorates, Etc.

- Charles Henry Collins, CMG, Colonial Administrative Service, Deputy Chief Secretary, Ceylon.
- Gate Mudaliyar Don Henry Kotelawala, JP. For public services in Ceylon.
- Mehmet Munir Bey, CBE. For public services in Cyprus.
- Harold Curwen Willan, CMG, MC, Colonial Legal Service, Chief Justice, Malayan Union.
- Eustace Gordon Woolford, OBE, KC. For public services in British Guiana.

=== Order of the Bath ===
==== Knight Grand Cross of the Order of the Bath (GCB) ====
Military Division

- Admiral Sir Algernon Usborne Willis, KCB, KBE, DSO, Royal Navy.
- General Sir Richard Nugent O'Connor, KCB, DSO, MC, ADC (936), late The Cameronians (Scottish Rifles).
- General Sir Daril Gerard Watson, KCB, CBE, MC, ADC (9758), late The Duke of Cornwall's Light Infantry.

Civil Division

- Sir Archibald Rowlands, KCB, MBE, Permanent Secretary, Ministry of Supply.

==== Knight Commander of the Order of the Bath (KCB) ====
Military Division

Royal Navy

- Surgeon Vice-Admiral Henry St. Clair Colson, CB, CBE, MB, BS, DPH.
- Vice-Admiral Wilfred Rupert Patterson, CB, CVO, CBE.
- Vice-Admiral Sir Cecil Ponsonby Talbot, KBE, CB, DSO, (Retired).

Army

- General Sir John Tredinnick Crocker, KBE, CB, DSO, MC, (10435), late Royal Tank Regiment, Royal Armoured Corps.
- Lieutenant-General Sir Neil Methuen Ritchie, KBE, CB, DSO, MC, (9334), late The Black Watch (Royal Highland Regiment).

Royal Air Force

- Acting Air Marshal Cyril Bertram Cooke, CB, CBE.
- Acting Air Marshal Robert Victor Goddard, CB, CBE.

Civil Division

- Sir Cecil Thomas Carr, KC, LLD, Counsel to the Speaker.
- John Gerald Lang, CB, Permanent Secretary, Admiralty.
- Sir Percivale Liesching, KCMG, Secretary, Ministry of Food.
- Sir (Albert) Henry Self, KCMG, KBE, CB, Permanent Secretary, Ministry of Civil Aviation.
- Sir (James) Ulick Francis Canning Alexander, KCVO, CMG, OBE, Keeper of the Privy Purse and Treasurer to The King.

==== Companion of the Order of the Bath (CB) ====
Military Division

Royal Navy

- Rear-Admiral Angus Edward Malise Bontine Cunninghame-Graham, CBE.
- Rear-Admiral Hugh Turnour England, DSO, (Retired).
- Rear-Admiral Gervase Boswell Middleton, CBE.
- Rear-Admiral (E) Charles Hepworth Nicholson, CBE.
- Rear-Admiral Reginald Maxwell Servaes, CBE.
- Rear-Admiral Guy Langton Warren (Retired).
- The Venerable Archdeacon John Kenneth Wilson, CBE, MA, KHCh, Chaplain of the Fleet.
- Temporary Captain Charles Rodger Noel Winn, OBE, Royal Naval Volunteer Reserve.

Army

- Major-General Frederick Sherwood Clover, CBE, AMIMechE, (8070), late Royal Army Service Corps.
- Major-General John Frederick Boyce Combe, DSO, (8669), late Royal Armoured Corps.
- Major-General William Alfred Dimoline, CBE, DSO, MC, (12284), late Royal Corps of Signals.
- Major-General (temporary) Bernard Edward Cooke Dixon, CBE, MC, (11443), late Corps of Royal Engineers.
- Major-General William Foot, MC, MB, KHP, (15373), late Royal Army Medical Corps.
- Major-General Harry Leicester Longden, CBE, (17955), late The Dorsetshire Regiment.
- Major-General Neil McMicking, CBE, DSO, MC, (8269), late The Black Watch (Royal Highland Regiment).
- Major-General Harold Redman, CBE, (15389), late The King's Own Yorkshire Light Infantry.
- Brigadier (temporary) Henry Shapcott, CBE, MC, (26224), late Extra Regimentally Employed List.
- Major-General (temporary) Alexander Wallace Sproull, CBE, BSc, MIMechE, MIEE, (11617), late Corps of Royal Engineers.
- Major-General (acting) Bertram Temple, OBE, MC, (5426), late The Gloucestershire Regiment.
- Major-General (acting) John Dane Woodall, OBE, MC, (1490), late Royal Regiment of Artillery.
- Colonel (Temporary Major-General) Roger Eustace Le Fleming, OBE, MC, Indian Army.
- Colonel (Acting Major-General) Henry Robinson Swinburn, MC, Indian Army.
- Colonel (Temporary Major-General) John Bernard Dalison, OBE, Indian Army.
- Colonel (Temporary Major-General) Malcolm Glover, OBE, Indian Army.

Royal Air Force

- Air Vice-Marshal Anthony Lauderdale Paxton, CBE, DFC.
- Air Vice-Marshal Thomas Arthur Warne-Browne, CBE, DSC.
- Acting Air Vice-Marshal Allan Lancelot Addison Perry-Keene, OBE.
- Air Commodore Frank Beaumont.
- Air Commodore Richard Bowen Jordan, DFC.
- Air Commodore John Gerard Willsley Weston, OBE.
- Group Captain Edgar Noel Lowe, CBE.

Civil Division

- Colonel Sir James Lithgow, Bt, GBE, MC, TD, Chairman, Territorial and Auxiliary Forces Association for the County of Renfrew.
- Brevet-Colonel William Dillworth Crewdson, TD, Chairman, Territorial and Auxiliary Forces Association for the County of Westmorland.
- Major Arthur Hardie Hill, MC, Chairman, Territorial and Auxiliary Forces Association for the County of Bute.
- Stanislaus Joseph Baker, Assistant Under-secretary of State, Home Office.
- Bernard Barnes, MC, Accountant-General, Ministry of Fuel and Power.
- Percy Barter, Chairman, Board of Control.
- Eric Blacklock Bowyer, Under-Secretary, Ministry of Supply.
- Geoffrey Ronald Aubert Buckland, Under-Secretary, Ministry of Labour and National Service.
- George Calder, Under-Secretary, Board of Trade.
- Albert Edgar Feavearyear, DSc, Under-Secretary, Ministry of Food.
- Reginald Hector Franklin, CBE, Under-Secretary, Ministry of Agriculture and Fisheries.
- Norman Arthur Guttery, Under-Secretary, Ministry of Transport.
- Benjamin Honour, MC, Principal Assistant Solicitor, Office of HM Procurator General and Treasury Solicitor.
- Reginald William Luce, MBE, Principal Assistant Secretary, Control Commission for Germany.
- James Edward Meade, Director, Economic Section, Cabinet Office.
- John David Morris, OBE, Under-secretary, Admiralty.
- Thomas Padmore, Third Secretary, HM Treasury.
- Edward Talbot Paris, DSc, Principal Director, Scientific Research (Defence), Ministry of Supply.
- Bertram Lamb Pearson, DSO, MC, Accountant-General, Ministry of Education.
- Harold Vale Rhodes, Under-Secretary, Ministry of National Insurance.
- Geoffrey William Berkeley Throckmorton, Clerk of the Journals, House of Commons.
- William Duncan Waterfall, Director of Savings, General Post Office.
- Major Michael Edward Adeane, MVO, Assistant Private Secretary to The King.

=== Order of the Star of India ===
==== Knight Grand Commander of the Order of the Star of India (GCSI) ====
- Colonel His Highness Maharaja Shri Sir Digvijaysinhji, GCIE, KCSI, ADC, Maharaja Jam Saheb of Nawanagar.

==== Knight Commander of the Order of the Star of India (KCSI) ====
- Lieutenant-General Sir Frank Walter Messervy, KBE, CB, DSO, Indian Army, General Officer Commanding-in-Chief, Northern Command, India.
- Sir George Hemming Spence, KCIE, CSI, Indian Civil Service, Secretary to the Government of India in the Legislative Department.

==== Companion of the Order of the Star of India (CSI) ====
- James Philip Mills, CIE, Indian Civil Service, Adviser to His Excellency the Governor for Tribal Areas and States, Shillong, Assam.
- Henry Stuart Bates, Indian Civil Service, Member, Board of Revenue, United Provinces.
- Brigadier Brian Palliser Tiegue O'Brien, OBE, MC, (IA.273), Indian Army, Director of Intelligence, General Headquarters, India.
- Walter Graham Lacey, CIE, Indian Civil Service, Divisional Commissioner, Bihar.
- Robert McIntosh, MBE, Indian Service of Engineers, Chief Engineer, Public Works Department (General, Buildings and Defence), Madras.
- Victor Kennard Maitland, MC, Indian Forest Service, Chief Conservator of Forests, Central Provinces and Berar.

=== Order of Saint Michael and Saint George ===
==== Knight Grand Cross of the Order of St Michael and St George (GCMG) ====
- The Honourable Sir James Mitchell, KCMG, Lieutenant-Governor of the State of Western Australia.
- Major-General Sir Hubert Jervoise Huddleston, GBE, KCMG, CB, DSO, MC, until recently Governor-General of the Sudan.

==== Knight Commander of the Order of St Michael and St George (KCMG) ====
- Richard Gordon Munro, CMG, MC, Representative of HM Treasury in Washington.
- Lieutenant-General Sir Brian Hubert Robertson, Bt, KCVO, CB, CBE, DSO, MC, Chief of Staff to the Commander-in-Chief, British Forces in Germany, and Deputy Military Governor.
- The Honourable Sir John Waters Kirwan, Kt, lately President of the Legislative Council of the State of Western Australia.
- Sir John Valentine Wistar Shaw, CMG, Governor and Commander-in-Chief, Trinidad.
- Sydney Caine, CMG, a Joint Deputy Under-Secretary of State, Colonial Office.
- Nevile Montagu Butler, CMG, CVO, an Assistant Under-Secretary of State in the Foreign Office.
- Cecil Bertrand Jerram, CMG, His Majesty's Envoy Extraordinary and Minister Plenipotentiary at Stockholm.
- William Henry Bradshaw Mack, CMG, United Kingdom Political Representative to the Austrian Government.

==== Companion of the Order of St Michael and St George (CMG) ====
- Reginald Albert Furness. For services with the British Food Mission in Washington.
- Hubert George Gee, Assistant Secretary, Ministry of Labour and National Service.
- Raymond Newton Kershaw, Adviser to the Bank of England.
- The Honourable John Gilbert Simon, lately Shipping Adviser, Ministry of Transport.
- Frederick William Smith. For services as Director-General of Building Materials, Ministry of Works.
- Roger Bentham Stevens. For services as Head of the British Secretariat, Washington, (now Counsellor, Foreign Office).
- Colonel Philip Graham Stock, CB, CBE, MB, FRCP, Medical Officer, Ministry of Health.
- Jack Pickering Cartledge, Assistant Parliamentary Draftsman, State of South Australia.
- The Honourable Charles Ernest Culley, a Member of the House of Assembly, and lately Chief Secretary and Minister for Transport, State of Tasmania.
- Russell William Thornton, CBE, Agricultural Adviser to the High Commissioner for Basutoland, the Bechuanaland Protectorate and Swaziland, and Director of the Native Land Settlement Department, Swaziland.
- Sydney Stubbs, lately a Member of the Legislative Assembly of the State of Western Australia.
- Robert Watson, OBE, Director of Agriculture, Burma.
- Robert Duncan Harris Arundell, Colonial Administrative Service, Resident British Member, Caribbean Commission, Washington.
- Henry Basten, Chairman and General Manager, Singapore and Penang Harbour Boards.
- Velupillai Coomaraswamy, Colonial Administrative Service, Government Agent, Western Province, Ceylon.
- Roger Alastair McLaren Davidson, Colonial Education Service, Director of Education, Nigeria.
- Christopher William Dawson, Colonial Administrative Service, Chief Secretary, Sarawak.
- Christopher Gilbert Eastwood, Assistant Under-Secretary of State, Colonial Office.
- Ronald Herbert Garvey, MBE, Colonial Administrative Service, Administrator, St. Vincent, Windward Islands.
- John Cloudesley Mundy, Commissioner of Inland Revenue, Kenya, and Commissioner of Income Tax, East Africa.
- John Dalzell Rankine, Colonial Administrative Service, Colonial Secretary, Barbados.
- Douglas William Robertson, DSO, MC, Colonial Administrative Service, Secretary for African Affairs, Uganda.
- The Honourable Edwin Herbert Samuel, Colonial Administrative Service, Director of Broadcasting, Palestine.
- Major Clarence Roy Turner, lately General Manager of the Gold Coast Railway.
- Patrick Henry Dean, Head of the German Department of the Foreign Office.
- Guy Francis Foley, OBE, MC, formerly Director of the Department of Economics and Trade, Sudan Government.
- Harold Charles Lehrs Gibson, attached to a Department of the Foreign Office.
- Hubert Ashton Graves, MC, Counsellor at His Majesty's Embassy in Washington.
- Paul Mason, Head of the United Nations (Political) Department of the Foreign Office.
- Sir Andrew Napier Noble, Bt., until recently Counsellor at His Majesty's Embassy in Buenos Aires.
- Denis Hubert Fletcher Rickett, Assistant Secretary, Offices of the Cabinet.
- Leslie Robert Sherwood, OBE, Head of the Finance Department of the Foreign Office.
- Geoffrey Arnold Wallinger, until recently Counsellor at His Majesty's Embassy in Nanking.

Honorary Companion

- H.H. Tunku Yacob Bin Sultan Abdul Hamid, State Agricultural Officer, Kedah, Malayan Union.

=== Order of the Indian Empire ===
==== Knight Commander of the Order of the Indian Empire (KCIE) ====
- Lieutenant-Colonel His Highness Maharaja Rajindra Prakash, Bahadur, Maharaja of Sirmur.
- The Honourable Lieutenant-Colonel William Rupert Hay, CSI, CIE, Indian Political Service, Political Resident in the Persian Gulf.
- George Edmond Brackenbury Abell, CIE, OBE, Indian Civil Service, Secretary to the Governor-General (Personal) and Private Secretary to His Excellency the Viceroy.
- Harold Samuel Eaton Stevens, CSI, CIE, MC, Indian Civil Service, Chief Secretary to the Government of Bengal.

==== Companion of the Order of the Indian Empire (CIE) ====
- Noel Kennedy Paterson, OBE, Indian Civil Service, lately Chief Commissioner, Andaman and Nicobar Islands.
- Charles Beresford Duke, OBE, Indian Political Service, Joint Secretary to the Government of India in the External Affairs Department.
- Colonel (Temporary Major-General) Joseph Edward Hirst, DSO, lately Chairman, Post-War Accommodation, Scales and Standards Committee, General Headquarters, India.
- Arthur George Hall, MBE, General Manager, North-Western Railway, Lahore.
- Colonel (Temporary Brigadier) (IA.594) Robert Charles Herron, OBE, Indian Electrical & Mechanical Engineers, Brigadier IEME, Northern Command, India.
- Hugh Beresford Kidd, Indian Police, Inspector-General of Police, Bombay.
- Lieutenant-Colonel Dudley Gordon Heriot de la Fargue, Indian Political Service, Chief Secretary to the Government of the North-West Frontier Province.
- Idris Wyn Lewys-Lloyd, OBE, Indian Civil Service, Secretary to His Excellency the Governor of the United Provinces.
- Kenneth Valentine Freeland Morton, Indian Civil Service, Secretary to the Government of the Punjab in the Electricity and Industries Departments.
- Francis Ernest Alfred Taylor, Indian Civil Service, Secretary to the Government of Bihar in the Revenue Department.
- Herbert Gwyther Bartley, Indian Police, Inspector-General of Police, Assam.
- William Geoffrey Dyson, MC, Indian Forest Service, Chief Conservator of Forests, Madras.
- Francis Theodore Castells, Financial Adviser and Chief Accounts Officer, Bengal-Nagpur Railway, Calcutta.
- Colonel Lloyd Kirwood Ledger, OBE, MRCS, DO, Indian Medical Service, Inspector-General of Civil Hospitals and Director of Public Health, Central Provinces and Berar.
- Lieutenant-Colonel Reginald Charles George Chapman, OBE, Master, Security Printing, India.
- Acting Captain (Commodore Second Class) Walter Richard Shewring, Royal Indian Navy Liaison Officer in London.
- Colonel Douglas Hendrie Currie, CBE, MC, DCM, Military Secretary to His Excellency the Viceroy.
- William Waters Finlay, Indian Civil Service, Deputy Commissioner in charge, Kumaun Division, Nairn Tal, United Provinces.
- Henry Verner Hampton, Indian Educational Service (retired), Member, Bombay-Sind Public Service Commissioners, Bombay.
- Hugh Keene, Indian Police, Deputy Inspector-General of Police, Madras.
- John Lewis Jenkins, Indian Police, Deputy Inspector-General of Police, Presidency Range, Bengal.
- Lieutenant-Commander William Hutcheon Watt, OBE, Royal Naval Reserve (retired), Deputy Director General of Civil Aviation in India.
- Ian Dixon Scott, Indian Political Service, Deputy Private Secretary to His Excellency the Viceroy.
- Lieutenant-Colonel John Malise Graham, DSO, MC, Chief of the Staff, His Exalted Highness the Nizam's Regular Forces, Hyderabad (Deccan).
- Benjamin Rigby Hardaker, Senior Adviser, Customs and Central Excises, Central Board of Revenue, Government of India.
- Richard Powell, Inspector-General of Police, Jammu and Kashmir State.
- Horace Algernon Fraser Rumbold, Secretary, Economic Department, India Office, London.

Honorary Companion

- Commander Colonel Daman Shumshere Jung Bahadur Rana, CBE, Consul-General for Nepal.

=== Royal Victorian Order ===
==== Knight Grand Cross of the Royal Victorian Order (GCVO) ====
- The Right Honourable Sir Alan Frederick Lascelles, KCB, KCVO, CMG, MC.
- Admiral Sir Dudley Burton Napier North, KCVO, CB, CSI, CMG.

==== Dame Commander of the Royal Victorian Order (DCVO) ====
- The Right Honourable Beatrice Mildred Edith, Baroness Harlech.

==== Knight Commander of the Royal Victorian Order (KCVO) ====
- Sir Hugh Lett, Bt, CBE, DCL, MB, ChB, FRCS.
- Admiral Sir Aubrey Clare Hugh Smith, KBE, CB, MVO.
- Surgeon Rear-Admiral Henry Ellis Yeo White, CVO, OBE, MD.
- Rear-Admiral William Gladstone Agnew, CB, CVO, DSO. (Note: Officers of HMS Vanguard, for services in connection with Their Majesties' visit to the Union of South Africa, Southern Rhodesia and other territories in Africa.)

==== Commander of the Royal Victorian Order (CVO) ====
- Lady Adelaide "Delia" Margaret Peel.
- Anthony Frederick Blunt.
- George Edward Fenton King, MVO.
- Commander the Honourable Humphry Legge, DSO, Royal Navy (Retired).
- Geoffrey Sydney Todd, OBE, MB, ChM, FRCP.
- Wing Commander Peter Wooldridge Townsend, DSO, DFC, Royal Air Force.
- Major John Lamplugh Wickham, MVO.
- Commander William John Lamb, MVO, OBE, Royal Navy.

==== Member of the Royal Victorian Order, 4th class (MVO) ====
At this time the two lowest classes of the Royal Victorian Order were "Member (fourth class)" and "Member (fifth class)", both with post-nominal letters MVO. "Member (fourth class)" was renamed "Lieutenant" (LVO) from the 1985 New Year Honours onwards.

- Lieutenant-Commander Peter William Beckwith Ashmore, DSC, Royal Navy.
- Captain William Albemarle Fellowes.
- Charles Frederic Glenny,
- Lionel Benedict Nicolson
- Commander (E) Lancelot Arthur Babington Peile, DSO, Royal Navy.
- Commander (S) Keith Leslie Dunn, Royal Navy.
- Lieutenant-Commander Ian Greynvile Steel, Royal Navy.
- Major Francis Vivian Dunn, MVO, Royal Marines.
- Major Reginald Carteret de Mussenden Leathes, Royal Marines.
- Acting Wing Commander Ernest William Tacon, DSO, DFC, AFC, (36196), Royal Air Force. (Note: Officers of The King's Flight, for services in connection with Their Majesties' visit to the Union of South Africa, Southern Rhodesia and other territories in Africa.)

==== Member of the Royal Victorian Order, 5th class (MVO) ====
- Albert Hugh Buckland,
- Harry Vincent Ireson,
- Mr. Frederick William Pardy, Warrant Catering Officer, Royal Navy.
- Sub-Lieutenant James Duncan Gordon Davidson, Royal Navy.
- Mr. Horace Benjamin Banford, Commissioned Boatswain, Royal Navy.
- Acting Squadron Leader Harold Frederick Payne, AFC, (46171), Royal Air Force.
- Acting Squadron Leader Harold Wright (83613), Royal Air Force Volunteer Reserve.
- Flight Lieutenant Arthur Knapper, AFC, (51842), Royal Air Force.
- Flight Lieutenant George Alexander Pearson (46106), Royal Air Force.
- Flight Lieutenant Lewis George Alfred Reed, DFC, (49333), Royal Air Force.

=== Order of the British Empire ===
==== Knight Grand Cross of the Order of the British Empire (GBE) ====
Civil Division

- Lieutenant-Colonel Sir John Robert Chancellor, GCMG, GCVO, DSO. For services to the Ministry of Agriculture and Fisheries.

==== Dame Commander of the Order of the British Empire (DBE) ====
Military Division

- Matilda Goodrich, RRC, Matron-in-Chief, Queen Alexandra's Royal Naval Nursing Service.

Civil Division

- Evelyn Emily Marian Fox, CBE. For services to mental health.
- Caroline Haslett, CBE. For services to the Board of Trade and the Ministry of Labour.
- Emmeline Mary Tanner, lately Headmistress of Roedean School. For services to education.

==== Knight Commander of the Order of the British Empire (KBE) ====
Military Division

- Lieutenant-General Gwilym Ivor Thomas, CB, DSO, MC, (1374), late Royal Regiment of Artillery.
- Lieutenant-General (Acting) Ernest Wood, CB, CIE, MC, Quartermaster General in India.
- Air Vice-Marshal William Boston Cushion, CB, CBE, Royal Air Force (Retired).

Civil Division

- William Castle Cleary, CB, Deputy Secretary, Ministry of Education.
- George Henry Henderson, CB, Secretary, Department of Health for Scotland.
- George David Roseway, CB, CBE, Deputy Under-Secretary of State, War Office.
- Harold Herbert Wiles, CB, MBE, Deputy Secretary, Ministry of Labour and National Service.
- The Honourable Cecil James Henry Campbell, CMG, Managing Director, Marconi Radio Telegraph Company of Egypt.
- Laurence Barton Grafftey-Smith, CMG, OBE, His Majesty's Envoy Extraordinary and Minister Plenipotentiary at Jedda.
- Sir Harry Harrison Burn, Imperial Chemical Industries, Calcutta, Bengal.
- Ralph Thompson Stoneham, Government Projects Financial Representative.
- George Ritchie Sandford, CMG, OBE, Colonial Administrative Service, Chief Secretary, East African Governor's Conference.

==== Commander of the Order of the British Empire (CBE) ====
Military Division

Royal Navy

- The Reverend Alexander Campsie, MC, DD, MA, KHCh, Chaplain.
- Engineer Captain Colin John Gray, DSO, ADC, (Retired).
- Temporary Surgeon Captain Robert Gregory Henderson, MD, ChB, DPH, Royal Naval Volunteer Reserve.
- Acting Captain Francis Deschamps Howie, DSO.
- Captain (S) William McBride, OBE.
- Colonel Raymond Humphrey Quill, DSO, MVO, Royal Marines.

Army

- Brigadier (temporary) Alec Pendock Aveline, MC, (13790), The Royal Berkshire Regiment (Princess Charlotte of Wales's).
- Colonel (acting) Samuel Leslie Bibby, OBE, (272469), Army Cadet Force.
- Brigadier (temporary) George Vallette Britten, OBE, MC, (44031), The Northamptonshire Regiment.
- Brigadier (temporary) James Rupert Cochrane (33328), Royal Regiment of Artillery.
- Brigadier (temporary) Basil Goodenough Cox, OBE, (13142), Royal Army Ordnance Corps.
- Brigadier (temporary) Kilner Rupert Brazier-Creagh, DSO, (44007), Royal Regiment of Artillery.
- Brigadier (temporary) Cyril Edwin Harold Dolphin (30838), The Royal Warwickshire Regiment.
- Major-General (local) Ian David Erskine, DSO, (15319), late Scots Guards.
- Colonel (temporary) Herbert Leslie Graham, MC, (6853), Scots Guards.
- Major-General (local) Ralph Edgeworth-Johnstone (11542), Reserve of Officers, late The Royal Northumberland Fusiliers.
- Brigadier (temporary) Ralph Emerson Pickering (15187), The Queen's Royal Regiment (West Surrey).
- Brigadier (temporary) Leslie Frederic Ethelbert Wieler (12759), The King's Own Yorkshire Light Infantry.
- Colonel (Temporary Major-General) Frederick Joseph Loftus-Tottenham, DSO, Commander, Force 401, Iraq.

Royal Air Force

- Acting Air Commodore Adolphus Dan Davies.
- Group Captain John Messurier Cohu.
- Group Captain Frederick Arthur Norton.
- Group Captain Geoffrey Charles Stemp.
- Acting Group Captain Harold Edmund Cardwell, AFC.
- Acting Group Captain Thomas George Gait Hutchinson.

Civil Division

- William Aston, Chairman, Denbighshire Education Committee.
- George Henry Bagnall, General Secretary, National Union of Dyers, Bleachers and Textile Workers.
- John Everett Creighton Bailey, Managing Director, Baird and Tatlock, Ltd.
- Roland Auriol Barker, MVO, Assistant Secretary, Ministry of Works.
- Geoffrey George Barnes, lately Assistant Secretary, Ministry of Food.
- Samuel Leslie George Beaufoy, FRIBA, Assistant Secretary, Ministry of Town and Country Planning.
- Cadet Colonel Lancelot William Bennett, OBE, VD. For services to the Army Cadet Force.
- Cecil Bentham, MInstCE, MIMechE, MInstT, Engineering Consultant to the Admiralty.
- Robert Hugh Bindloss, FSA, Executive Director, National Service Hostels Corporation Ltd.
- William Newton Booth, MBE, AMInstCE, MIMechE, MIGasE, Chief Mechanical Engineer and Superintendent of Building Works, Royal Ordnance Factories, Woolwich.
- Leslie Ripley Bradley, OBE, Director, Imperial War Museum.
- Gerald Burdon Brown, Director of Education for Cumberland.
- George Lindor Brown, MSc, MB, ChB, FRS. For services to medical research in the Royal Navy.
- Oscar Frank Brown, Assistant Secretary, Department of Scientific and Industrial Research.
- Eric Cartwright, Chairman of the Weaving Advisory Committee, Cotton Board.
- Thomas Chadwick, CVO, OBE, Accountant, HM Treasury.
- Alderman Charles Borthwick Chartres, MIEE, JP, Vice-Chairman of the Agricultural Machinery Development Board.
- Tom Peach Colclough, DSc. For services to the Ministry of Supply.
- Ernest Benjamin Cook, Adviser on Shipping Values to the Ministry of War Transport.
- Henry Anstey Cookson, MB, ChB, FRCS.Ed, FRCP.Ed, DPH. For public services in the County of Durham.
- Captain William Harry Coombs, President, Officers (Merchant Navy) Federation Ltd.
- Cyril Russell Dashwood, OBE, Chief Accountant, Great Western Railway Company.
- James Llefelys Davies, Assistant General Manager, Milk Marketing Board.
- Jesse Cooper Dawes, OBE, Director of Salvage and Recovery, Board of Trade.
- John Carmichael Denholm, Director, J. and J. Denholm, Ltd.
- Frank Dobson, ARA, Sculptor.
- Francis Edmond, Member, Safety in Mines Research Board.
- Geoffrey Cecil Ryves Eley, Director of Overseas Disposals, Ministry of Supply.
- Hubert Moore Fairweather, FRIBA. For services to building construction.
- Leslie William Farrow, FCA, Chairman of the National Brick Advisory Council.
- John Scott Ferrier, Flax Controller, Board of Trade.
- Ernest Wensley Lapthorn Field, MIMechE, MINA, Director, North West Engineering Trades Employers' Association.
- Eric Wilfred Fish, MD, ChB, DSc, LDS, Dental Surgeon, St. Mary's Hospital, London.
- William Thomas Fitzgerald, lately Chief Inspector, Ministry of National Insurance.
- John Henry Gunlake, FIA, lately Assistant Statistical Adviser, Ministry of Transport.
- James Andrew Gunn, MD, DSc, FRCP, Chairman, British Pharmacopoeia Commission.
- Dorothy Margaret Hammonds, Chief Inspector, Ministry of Education.
- Thomas Mimes Harbottle, MC, Chairman, Local Price Regulation Committee, Northern Region, Board of Trade.
- Archibald Frederick Harrison, Assistant Solicitor, Ministry of Labour and National Service.
- Frank Wyndham Hirst, OBE, Joint Assistant Public Trustee.
- Henry Weston Howard, Chairman of the Eastern Regional Board for Industry.
- Samuel Thompson Irwin, MCh, FRCS, Chairman, Northern Ireland Medical War Committee.
- Robert Ponton Kerr, MBE, Command Secretary, Eastern Command, War Office.
- Arthur Stanley King, Assistant Secretary, Ministry of Supply.
- Alderman Bertie Victor Kirby, DCM, JP, MP, Member of Parliament for the Everton Division of Liverpool since 1935. For political and public services.
- Harold Lister Kirke, MIEE, Head of the Research Department, British Broadcasting Corporation.
- Sydney Laskey, Assistant Secretary, Ministry of Education.
- Arthur George Lee. For services to the Ministry of National Insurance.
- Alderman Walter Samuel Lewis, JP. For public services in Birmingham.
- James Robert Lumsden, DL, Chairman of Directors, Highland and Agricultural Society of Scotland.
- John McCaughey, DL, Chairman, Belfast Harbour Board.
- George Rettie McIntosh, Member of Aberdeen Town Council.
- John McLean, Member of the Ministry of Labour Committee on Training for Business Administration.
- Charles Walden Kirkpatrick MacMullan, Principal Assistant Secretary, Ministry of Labour and National Service.
- Rowland Nicholas, MInstCE, City Surveyor and Engineer, Manchester.
- Arthur Trevor Nichols, Assistant Secretary, Air Ministry.
- Lieutenant-Colonel Sholto Stuart Ogilvie, DSO, Lately Joint Manager, National Gas Council of Great Britain and Ireland.
- John Augustus Oriel, MC, General Manager of the Shell Refining and Marketing Company Ltd.
- Leslie Walter Phillips, Controller of Storage and Transport, Ministry of Food.
- Charles Russell Pledger, MBE, Clerk to the Special Commissioners of Income Tax, Board of Inland Revenue.
- Frank Waller Rattenbury, OBE, Adviser on Hospital Finance and Business, Ministry of Health.
- Ernest William Reardon, Assistant Secretary, Board of Trade.
- Walter Harpham Rhodes. For services to the Canada Educational Trust.
- Francis Noel Roberts, Assistant Secretary, HM Customs and Excise.
- Frederick Augustus Secrett, Technical Adviser on Vegetable Production, Ministry of Agriculture and Fisheries.
- George Frederick Silley, Shipyard Manager, R. and H. Green and Silley Weir, Ltd., London.
- Victor William Smith, OBE, Civil Assistant, War Office.
- Captain John Christie Stewart, JP, DL, Chairman of the Executive Committee, Scottish Branch, British Red Cross Society.
- Aldwyn Brockway Stokes, MB, BCh, MRCS, MRCP, DCH, DPM, Lately Member, National Advisory Council on the Employment of the Disabled.
- Walter Ernest Strudwicke, MBE, MC, ACA, Chief Accountant, Ministry of Agriculture and Fisheries.
- Henry Studdy, Chief Constable, West Riding Constabulary.
- Lucy Stuart Sutherland. For services to the Lace Industry. Principal of Lady Margaret Hall, Oxford.
- Professor Eric Reginald Pearce Vincent, DPhil, lately employed in a Department of the Foreign Office.
- Charles Clement Walker, FRAeS, AMInstCE, Director and Chief Engineer, de Havilland Aircraft Company, Ltd.
- Gilbert Watson, HM Senior Chief Inspector of Schools, Scottish Education Department.
- Margaret Watts, Secretary, Merchant Navy Comforts Service.
- Arthur Wells, Controller, Stores Department, General Post Office.
- Wilfrid Leicester Whitaker, OBE, Superintendent, Operative Department, Royal Mint.
- Geoffrey Arundel Whitworth, Founder and Director of the British Drama League.
- Arthur Wilson, Assistant Secretary, Ministry of Pensions.
- William Wilson, OBE, Assistant Secretary, Home Office.
- Frederick Edward Withington, JP, DL, Chairman, Oxfordshire War Agricultural Executive Committee.
- Frank Wolstencroft, General Secretary, Amalgamated Society of Woodworkers.
- Arthur James Drummond Woods, Assistant Secretary, War Damage Commission.
- James Mann Wordie. For services to exploration in the Antarctic.
- Maurice Edward Bathurst, formerly Legal Adviser to His Majesty's Embassy in Washington, (now Legal Adviser to the United Kingdom Delegation to the United Nations.)
- Hubert John Collar, British subject resident in China.
- Walter Fletcher, OBE, MP. For special war services in connexion with Far Eastern affairs.
- Horace Stephen Gibson, General Fields Manager, Anglo-Iranian Oil Company, Tehran.
- Henry Hugh Grindley, OBE, Director and General Manager, Central Uruguayan Railway Company, Montevideo.
- Eric Ralph Lingeman, Counsellor (Commercial) at His Majesty's Embassy at Ankara.
- Major-General Alexander Patrick Drummond Telfer-Smollett, CB, DSO, MC, lately Commissioner, British Red Cross Society, South East Asia.
- Gavin Burton Stewart, formerly attached to a Department of the Foreign Office.
- Peter Corsar Anderson, MA, Headmaster of Scotch College, State of Western Australia, 1904–45. For services to Education.
- Conrad Trelawney Fitzgerald, MD, CM, a medical practitioner, and also Medical Health Officer for the Department of Public Health and Welfare, St Trinity East, Newfoundland.
- Donald MacIntyre, Mayor of Bulawayo, Southern Rhodesia. For municipal and political services.
- James Arthur Prescott, DSc, Director of the Waite Agricultural Research Institute, and Chief of the Division of Soils of the Council of Scientific and Industrial Research, State of South Australia.
- Noel St. Quintin, Mayor of Salisbury, Southern Rhodesia.
- Brigadier Leonard Joseph Lancelot Addison, Deputy Chief Director of Purchase, Department of Food, Government of India.
- Charles Pritchard Lawson, Member of the Central Legislative Assembly, lately President, European Association.
- Basil William Batchelor, Director, Messrs. Binny and Company, Limited, Madras.
- Victor William Smith, OBE, Indian Police (Retired).
- George Chettle, OBE, Deputy Inspector-General of Police, Burma.
- Edwin Arthur Blok, LMS, LRCP&S, LRFP&S, lately Assistant Director of Medical Services, Ceylon.
- Noel Stewart Clouston, OBE, Colonial Survey Service, lately Commissioner of Lands and Director of Surveys, Nigeria.
- Henry Vernon Cusack, Colonial Audit Service, Deputy Director, Colonial Audit Department.
- Stanley Hudson Dodwell. For public services in Hong Kong.
- Robert Ranulf Glanville, MBE, Colonial Agricultural Service, Director of Agriculture, Sierra Leone.
- Khong Kam Tak, MBE, JP, MB, BCh. For public services in the Malayan Union.
- Thomas Spurgeon Page. For public services in Northern Rhodesia.
- Edwin Ronald Sudbury, OBE, Colonial Administrative Service, Commissioner of Parliamentary Elections, Ceylon.
- Ralph Henry Walter Wisdom, Colonial Education Service, Director of Education, Nyasaland.

Honorary Commanders

- Raja Uda Bin Raja Mohamed, Deputy Resident Commissioner, Selangor (Interior) Malayan Union.
- Dato Johan Pahlawan Lela Perkasa Setiawan, Undang of Johol, Negri Sembilan, Ruling Chief, Malayan Union.
- Sarkin Sudan, Umaru Maidubu, Emir of Kontagora (First Class Chief), Nigeria.

==== Officer of the Order of the British Empire (OBE) ====
Military Division

Royal Navy

- Acting Captain Thomas Ramsey Beatty, (Retired).
- Engineer Commander Francis William Burden, (Retired).
- Commander Carey Robert Easten De Jersey, (Retired).
- Acting Captain John Victor Findlay.
- Captain Reginald John Harland, Master, Royal Fleet Auxiliary.
- Lieutenant-Colonel Kenneth Hunt, Royal Marines.
- Commander (S) Stuart Archibald Joliffe.
- Marjorie Florence Miller, Superintendent, Women's Royal Naval Service.
- Commander (L) Charles Vernon Robinson.
- Commander (E) Alfred Broughton Vickery.
- Surgeon Commander Edward William Bingham, MB, ChB.

Additional Officers

- Commander Ronald Etridge Portlock. (Note: For services in operational minesweeping.)
- Commander Quintin Pascoe Whitford.

Army

- Lieutenant-Colonel (temporary) William Maurice Leopold Adler (53739), The Welch Regiment.
- Lieutenant-Colonel (acting) Charles David Bruce, MB, (35750), Royal Army Medical Corps.
- Lieutenant-Colonel (temporary) Arthur Harold Buckham (65698), The Royal Berkshire Regiment (Princess Charlotte of Wales's).
- Lieutenant-Colonel (temporary) Terence Burrowes, BA, (44012), Corps of Royal Engineers.
- Lieutenant-Colonel (Ordnance Executive Officer) Herbert Ross Cameron (40064), Royal Army Ordnance Corps.
- Lieutenant-Colonel (temporary) Alexander Cleghorn, TD, BSc, AMInstCE, (48133), Corps of Royal Engineers.
- Senior Commander (temporary) (Formerly Chief Commander (temporary)) Mary Katherine Rosamund Colvin (192684), Auxiliary Territorial Service.
- Lieutenant-Colonel (temporary) John Winder Cusack (318546), General List, African Colonial Forces Section.
- Colonel (local) Harold Drury (31686), The East Lancashire Regiment.
- Lieutenant-Colonel (temporary) Henry Faulk (240703), Intelligence Corps.
- Lieutenant-Colonel (temporary) Robert David Finlay (154923), Royal Pioneer Corps.
- Lieutenant-Colonel (temporary) Walter Michael Graham (27982), The Royal Fusiliers (City of London Regiment).
- Lieutenant-Colonel (temporary) Albert Neville Griffiths (140928), Royal Corps of Signals.
- Lieutenant-Colonel (temporary) Cecil Alexander Tollemache Halliday, MBE, (52954), The Royal Hampshire Regiment.
- Lieutenant-Colonel (acting) Thomas Neville Hammond (4055), Army Cadet Force.
- Lieutenant-Colonel (temporary) Arthur Hichens (56296), Royal Regiment of Artillery.
- Lieutenant-Colonel (temporary) Frederick Charles Hitchcock, MC, (11097), Retired Pay, late The East Surrey Regiment.
- Lieutenant-Colonel (now Brigadier (temporary)) Gilbert Daly Holmes, MBE, (12489), Royal Regiment of Artillery.
- Lieutenant-Colonel (temporary) Gerald William Plant Kimm (4384), Royal Army Educational Corps.
- Lieutenant-Colonel (acting) George Alexander Milton Leathem (283163), Army Cadet Force.
- Lieutenant-Colonel (temporary) George Douglas McAndrew, AMInstCE(G), (46173), Corps of Royal Engineers.
- Lieutenant-Colonel (temporary) Hubert Charles Mitchell (12210), Royal Army Service Corps.
- Lieutenant-Colonel (temporary) George Slater Nangle, DSO, (337322), 9th Gurkha Rifles, Indian Army.
- Lieutenant-Colonel (temporary) Airey Middleton Sheffield Neave, DSO, MC, (66518), Royal Regiment of Artillery.
- Lieutenant-Colonel (temporary) John Elliott Nelson, MBE, MC, BA, (5535), Royal Army Educational Corps.
- Lieutenant-Colonel Bertram Yorke Hayes-Newington (10077), The Cheshire Regiment.
- Lieutenant-Colonel (temporary) Charles Johnstone Newport (1548), Reserve of Officers, late The Royal Ulster Rifles.
- Lieutenant-Colonel (Staff Paymaster Class I) (temporary) Frederick George Norton, MC, DCM, (24154), Royal Army Pay Corps.
- Lieutenant-Colonel (temporary) Eric Charles Scott Reid (66834), The Oxfordshire and Buckinghamshire Light Infantry.
- Lieutenant-Colonel Melville Desmond Savill (62585), Royal Army Ordnance Corps.
- Lieutenant-Colonel (temporary) Reginald Spooner (137403), Corps of Royal Engineers.
- Lieutenant-Colonel (now Colonel (temporary)) John Edward Swindlehurst, MIEE, AMIMechE, (47478), Corps of Royal Engineers.
- Commander Ninian Taylor, MBE, Women's Auxiliary Services (Burma).
- Lieutenant-Colonel (temporary) Harry Wilkinson, AMIMechE, (188776), Royal Electrical and Mechanical Engineers.
- Lieutenant-Colonel (War Substantive Colonel) (Temporary Brigadier) Charles Edward Macguckin, MBE, Military Farms Department.
- War Substantive Lieutenant-Colonel (Temporary Brigadier) Desmond Young, MC, Indian Army, lately Director of Public Relations, General Headquarters, India.
- War Substantive Lieutenant-Colonel (Temporary Colonel) Frank Spencer, MBE, Indian Army, General Headquarters, New Delhi, India.
- Lieutenant-Colonel Frederick Grace Smith, MBE, ED, Officer Commanding, Ceylon Medical Corps.

Royal Air Force

- Group Captain Donald David Christie, AFC.
- Acting Group Captain William Digby Blackwood, DFC.
- Acting Group Captain William Ivan Guy Kerby.
- Wing Commander Frederic Elgar Burton, DFC, (37623), Reserve of Air Force Officers.
- Wing Commander Claude Frederick Goatcher (11100).
- Wing Commander William Leigh Houlbrook (29242).
- Wing Commander Harold Francis Jenkins, AFC, (22080).
- Wing Commander James Douglas Melvin (33170).
- Wing Commander Kenneth Slater, AFC, (37330).
- Acting Wing Commander James Houghton Page, TD, (67775), Royal Air Force Volunteer Reserve.
- Squadron Leader Harold Eric Barker (31306).
- Acting Squadron Leader John Henry Wortley, MM, (60847), Royal Air Force Volunteer Reserve.
- Acting Group Officer Pamela Constance Greig (80), Women's Auxiliary Air Force.

Civil Division

- Robert Addis, Chairman and Managing Director, Addis Ltd.
- Lieutenant-Colonel Kenneth Morland Agnew, DSO, MC, Deputy Commissioner for Civilian Relief, British Red Cross Society, North West Europe.
- Joseph Allen, JP, President of the County Tyrone Savings Committee.
- George Sidney Bishop, Principal, Ministry of Food.
- John Emery Inskip Bloom, ASAA, Assistant Head of Branch, Registry of Friendly Societies.
- Charles Frederick Booth, MIEE, Assistant Staff Engineer, General Post Office.
- Harold Boston, Chairman, North-Western Wholesale Meat Supply Association, Ltd.
- James Gilbert Bott, Postmaster Surveyor, Head Post Office, Glasgow.
- Frances Beatrice Bradfield, FRAeS, Principal Scientific Officer, Royal Aircraft Establishment, Farnborough.
- Jurat Philip Ernest Bree, Jurat of Jersey.
- Wilfred Arthur Bridge, Divisional Road Haulage Officer, Ministry of Transport.
- Charles John Bromhead, Chief Executive Officer, Ministry of National Insurance.
- William Fearon Brown, MINA, MIMarE, Chief Superintendent Engineer, Clan Line Steamers Ltd.
- Bernard Frederick Browne, MInstCE, MIEE, Regional Gas Officer, North-East Region, Ministry of Fuel and Power.
- Charles Ernest Bullock, Chairman and Secretary, British Sanitary Earthenware Manufacturers' Association.
- Leslie George Bullock, Principal Officer, Southern and South-Eastern Civil Defence Regions, Home Office.
- Sidney Joseph Burford, Chief Inspector, National Insurance Audit Department.
- The Honourable Anne Judith Burrell, Chairman of the Women's Land Army for West Sussex.
- Ivor Henry George Calcutt, Supervising Lands Officer, Directorate of Works, Air Ministry.
- Allan Caldwell, MINA, MIMarE, Director, Halford Constant Ltd., London.
- James Carson, Director, Stewarts and Lloyds, Ltd., lately Director, New Crown Forgings Ltd., Glasgow.
- Archibald Barron Cathcart, MInstCE, MIMechE, lately Waterworks Engineer, Brighton Corporation.
- George Ransford Cawood, House Coal Officer, North-Eastern Region.
- Leslie Jack Cheshire, Senior Engineer, English Electric Company Ltd.
- Alfred Chivers, Director, W. E. Olivers and Sons Ltd., Contractors.
- Reginald John Nevill Clean, Head of Division, Ministry of Food.
- Edgar Hugh Collcutt, County Road Surveyor, Cornwall.
- Allister Gillespie Cowan, Chairman of the Honorary Directors, Lord Roberts Memorial Workshops for Disabled Ex-Service Men, South-East Scottish District, Edinburgh.
- Alfred Robert Harold Cox, Finance and Accounts Officer, Department of Scientific and Industrial Research.
- Frank Crookes, Manager, Manchester Office, W. Robinson and Son (Converters) Ltd., Toronto.
- Stanley Geikie Cuff, MBE, Lately Deputy Director of Tea, Ministry of Food.
- John David Griffith Davies, lately Assistant Secretary of the Royal Society.
- Lieutenant-Colonel Geoffrey Herbert Day, Senior Control Officer, Control Commission for Germany.
- Sydney Albert Deacon, one of HM Trade Commissioners in Australia.
- Charles Frederick Dickson. For services as Chairman of the Executive Council, Stage Door Canteen, Ltd.
- Hinton Douglas, Financial Officer, Electricity Commission.
- William Downs, English correspondent and adviser to the Wool Administrator, Wartime Prices and Trade Board of Canada.
- Frederick Stewart Eden, Senior Inspector of Taxes, Board of Inland Revenue.
- Stanley Embleton, County Commissioner, Northumberland and Durham, St. John Ambulance Brigade.
- Ernest Chattock Farmer, FIA, Actuary of the National Amalgamated Approved Society.
- Thomas Matthew Ferguson, JP, General Secretary, Dundee and District Union of Jute and Flax Workers.
- The Reverend Joseph Firth, MC, Secretary, Navy, Army and Air Force Board of the Methodist Church.
- Hubert Lionel Fletcher, Director of Education, Isle of Man.
- William Francis Fox, Senior Legal Assistant, Charity Commission.
- Robert Edward France, Principal, India Office.
- Reginald Ernest Franklin, Deputy Commander, Metropolitan Police.
- William Thomson Fraser, LRIBA, Assistant Chief Architect, Ministry of Works.
- Major Arthur Cecil French, Secretary, Territorial Army Association of the County of Cambridge and Isle of Ely.
- Christopher Turtill Fulcher, Borough Surveyor, Shoreditch.
- Lieutenant-Colonel Reginald Simon Gallienne, Employed in a Department of the Foreign Office.
- Richard William Lewis Gawn, Superintendent, Admiralty Experimental Works, Haslar.
- The Reverend Frederick William George Gilbey. For services to the welfare of the deaf and dumb.
- John Beaton Gordon, Controller of Inspection Services, Inspection Board of Canada.
- George Goldie Graham, JP, Secretary, Scottish Football Association.
- Henry Hamilton Green, DSc, Senior Research Officer, Grade I, Ministry of Agriculture and Fisheries.
- William Louis Greenwood, Personnel and Contracts Manager, Murphy Radio Ltd.
- Annie Catherine Mary Gulland, MBE, Principal, Ministry of Labour and National Service.
- Herbert Halliday, Director, National Federation of Clay Industries.
- George Eric Harden, Principal, Admiralty.
- Robert Ernest Hardingham, Principal Surveyor, Air Registration Board.
- Arthur Joseph Quin-Harkin. For accounting services with Imperial Airways Ltd., and the British Overseas Airways Corporation.
- Verney Leigh Harkness, Principal Housing Officer, North Midland Region, Ministry of Health.
- Cyril George Harris, Head of Division, Tithe Redemption Commission.
- Catherine Harrower, MB, ChB, Member of the Glasgow Burgh Insurance Committee.
- Charles Henry Harvey, MBE, JP, Chairman, Leominster and Wigmore Savings Committee.
- Major Horace Reginald Haslett, lately Chairman, Belfast Branch, British Legion.
- Edward Thomas Hayward, Assistant Inspector-in-Chief, Headquarters, National Fire Service.
- Henry Arthur Hayward, MBE, Principal, Control Commission for Germany.
- Sarah Jane Hayward, JP, Alderman, Newport, Monmouthshire, Town Council.
- William Stanley Hocking, MBE, Actuary, Government Actuary's Department.
- William Edward Hopkin, Member of Wales Regional Board for Industry. District Secretary, South-Western District, National Union of General and Municipal Workers.
- Frank Leslie Howard, Assistant Secretary, Civil Service Commission.
- Major Rupert Howard, MBE, Manager of the English Cricket Team in Australia.
- John Pryse Howell, MSc. For services to agricultural economics and farming in Wales.
- Ernest John Hunt, Principal, Air Ministry.
- Alexander Hutcheon, Staff Controller, Welsh and Border Counties Region, General Post Office.
- Hugh Unwin Irving. For public services in Staffordshire.
- Major James Albert Iveson, MC. For services to the British Legion in Yorkshire.
- Percy William David Izzard, Journalist. For services in connection with home food production.
- David William Leslie Jones. For public services in Monmouthshire.
- Eric Harrison Jones, Principal Officer, Ministry of Health and Local Government, Northern Ireland.
- Norman Howard-Jones, MRCS, LRCP, Director, Medical Department, British Council.
- Lieutenant-Colonel Robert Kelsall, DSO, MD, ChB, BS, Chairman, High Wycombe Medical Board.
- Harry John Kemp, lately Assistant Solicitor, Ministry of Agriculture and Fisheries.
- William John Killingback, MBE, Secretary of the Civil Service Benevolent Fund.
- John Alwyne Kitching, MA, PhD, Lecturer in Zoology, University of Bristol.
- Arthur Claude Knowling, Assistant Director of Telecommunications, Ministry of Civil Aviation.
- Leonard Charles Labram, Principal, Home Office.
- John Lamb, Technical Manager, Marine Department, Anglo-Saxon Petroleum Company, Ltd.
- Charles Landstone, Associate Drama Director of the Arts Council of Great Britain.
- Robert Buntin Lang, Assistant Director of Finance, Ministry of Transport.
- Claude Henry Leddra, Chief Constructor, HM Dockyard, Chatham.
- Thomas Frederick Lee, AMIEE, Secretary, Telephone Exchange Equipment and Telephone Apparatus Bulk Supplies Committees.
- George Lodge, MBE, Manager, Imperial Cinemas, Northern Ireland. For services to the Forces.
- John Holt Loyd, Clerk, Kent Insurance Committee.
- Maitland Mackie, Member, Agricultural Executive Committee for Aberdeen and Ellon.
- Robert Mackinnon, Principal, Department of Agriculture for Scotland.
- William Hutchison McMillan, MIMinE, Hood Professor of Mining, Edinburgh University.
- Thomas Beaton Manson, FSI, Chief Lands Officer, Department of Agriculture for Scotland.
- David Marshall, MC, Secretary, West Fife and Kinross Agricultural Executive Committee.
- Henry Sutcliffe Marshall, MBE, Principal, HM Customs and Excise.
- Margaret Colville Marshall, ARRC, Lady Superintendent of Nurses, Edinburgh Royal Infirmary.
- Winifred Mason, Staff Commander, First Aid Nursing Yeomanry (Women's Transport Service).
- William Henry Mayne, JP, Chairman and Treasurer, National Council of the Young Men’s Christian Association for Wales.
- Edward Walter Reginald Medway, MM, Principal, Board of Trade.
- Peter Miller, Chief Accountant, Supreme Court of Judicature.
- Frederick Albert Monroe, JP, President, Association of Municipal Authorities, Northern Ireland.
- John Picken Morrison, Town Clerk, Paisley.
- Robin Mugford, Chairman, Watford Savings Committee.
- James Kirkland Murdoch, Adviser on Milk Supplies for Scotland, Ministry of Food.
- John Reginald Nelson, MBE, Principal, War Office.
- Professor Frederick Norman, Employed in a Department of the Foreign Office.
- John Basil Ogden, Town Clerk, City of Bath.
- Lewis Georgia Peake, Chairman, Reinstatement in Civil Employment Committee, Romford and Grays.
- William Edward Peake, Principal, Ardwick Secondary School, Manchester.
- Sidney Gilbert Pennells, Principal, Burma Office.
- James Hay Petrie, Manager and Treasurer, Aberdeen Harbour Commissioners.
- Robert Marsh Phillimore, Principal, Ministry of Fuel and Power.
- Edgar Phillipps, Director, Duplicating and Distributing Division, HM Stationery Office.
- Frederic Oliver Pickersgill, lately Assistant Regional Controller, Ministry of Labour and National Service.
- William Harold Pierce. For services to the Liverpool Savings Committee.
- Olive Sibella Prentice, MBE, ARRC, County Director, County of London Branch, British Red Cross Society.
- Councillor William Hamilton Jollow Priest, Chairman, Plymouth Local Employment Committee.
- William Luard Raynes, Alderman, Cambridge Borough Council.
- Joseph Stanley Redshaw, Director and Principal Naval Architect, Vickers-Armstrongs Ltd.
- Eric Resher, Regional Manager, London (South-Eastern) Region, War Damage Commission.
- John Riddell, lately Director, Rubber Control, Board of Trade.
- Alderman William Robinson, JP, lately Mayor of Richmond, Yorkshire.
- John Nogveira Rosa, lately Administrative Officer, Colonial Office.
- Neville Arthur Rust, Honorary Secretary, Surrey, Soldiers', Sailors' and Airmen's Families Association.
- Richard Dudley Ryder, Chief Exhibitions Officer, Council of Industrial Design.
- Alderman Charles Saer, TD. For public services in Fleetwood, Lancashire.
- Colonel John Dudley Sherwood, DL, Deputy County Army Welfare Officer for Essex.
- Dorothy Frances Shuckburgh, Librarian, Ministry of Education.
- Edward Frank Simmonds, MBE, Principal Officer, Ministry of Works.
- Arthur George Simons, Superintending Civil Engineer, Grade I, Air Ministry.
- George Smith, MBE, MIEE, Superintending Engineer, Ministry of Works.
- George Stanley Smith, MBE, MC, Brigade Secretary, Boys' Brigade.
- Winifred Matilda Smith, Principal, Ministry of National Insurance.
- Sidney Stagg, Assistant Secretary, Development Commission.
- Donald Victor Staines, MBE, Chief Executive Officer, Foreign Office.
- Charles Eric Strong, MIEE, Chief Radio Engineer, Standard Telephones and Cables Ltd.
- Gertrude Frances Summers, Staff Inspector, Ministry of Education.
- Herbert William Swann, AMIEE, Senior Electrical Inspector, Ministry of Labour and National Service.
- The Right Honourable Stuart Albert Samuel, Baron Swaythling, Vice-Chairman, Local Price Regulation Committee, London.
- Frederick Tattersfield, DSc, FRIC, Principal Scientific Officer, Rothamsted Experimental Station.
- Leonard Whitworth Taylor, Secretary, Incorporated Association of Headmasters.
- Samuel Pointon Taylor, FRIBA, Architect, Ministry of Health.
- John Emrys Thomas, Regional Officer for Wales, Assistance Board.
- Tom Thornley, Chairman of Marcom Ltd., London.
- Edgar Thrale, Secretary, Hull Fishing Vessel Owners' Association.
- Sydney Ernest Trenaman, Chief Accountant, Central Office of Information.
- Patrick Graeme Tweedie, Deputy Chief Inspector of Accidents, Ministry of Civil Aviation.
- Councillor Frederick Leslie Wallis, JP, Vice-Chairman, Ministry of Works National Consultative Council.
- Alexander Warley, Engine Works Manager, Smith's Dock Company Ltd., Middlesbrough.
- Captain Timothy Henry Hamilton Warren, DL, Commandant, Glasgow City Special Constabulary.
- James Watkinson, Deputy Regional Controller, East and West Ridings Region, Ministry of Supply.
- Alexander George Webb, MBE, Director of Employment and Pensions, British Legion.
- Edward Thomas Wheadon, Deputy of the People of the States of Guernsey.
- Evan Williams, JP, Lately Director of Labour, Wales Region, Ministry of Fuel and Power.
- Gwilym Ffrangcon Williams. For services to the National Savings Movement in South Wales.
- Alderman Tom Williams. For services to agriculture in Montgomeryshire.
- Jeffrey Overend Wood, MInstT, Chairman and Managing Director, T. F. Wood and Company, Ltd., York.
- William Wood, Signal and Telegraph Engineer, London, Midland and Scottish Railway Company.
- Alfred Oswald Woodgate, Principal Clerk, Ministry of Pensions.
- Arthur Mainwaring Wooldridge, PASI, FAI, Superintending Valuer, Board of Inland Revenue.
- Gerald Ashley Wright, MC, Clerk and Engineer, River Dee Catchment Board.
- Francis William Yelf, Vice-Chairman, City of Westminster Savings Committee.
- Angelo Anastasi, British Consul at Lugano.
- James Alexander Burns, British subject resident in Brazil.
- Harold Edwin Caustin. For services with the United Nations Relief and Rehabilitation Administration in the United States of America.
- Elisabeth Shepherd-Cross, Assistant Commissioner (Welfare), British Red Cross Society, South East Asia.
- Charles Alexander Gault, until recently His Majesty's Consul at Isfahan, (now serving on the staff of the United Kingdom High Commissioner in India.)
- The Venerable Bertie James Harper, MBE, Archdeacon of Khartoum.
- Arthur Errington Heskett, General Manager of the Antofagasta-Bolivia Railway, Antofagasta.
- William Gruffydd Rhys Howell, until recently His Majesty's Consul at New York, (now Acting Counsellor (Commercial) at His Majesty's Embassy in Buenos Aires.)
- Captain John Alfred Stewart Jackson, British subject resident in Chile.
- William Henry Tucker Luce, Member of the Sudan Political Service.
- George Johnson Neill, MBE, His Majesty's Consul at Rouen.
- Mark Farquhar Oliver, attached to a Department of the Foreign Office.
- Cecil Cuthbert Parrott, First Secretary (Information) at His Majesty's Embassy in Prague.
- Major Julian Higham Phillipson, Assistant Commissioner, British Red Cross Society, South East Asia.
- Sydney Martyn Stabler, Honorary Commercial Attaché at His Majesty's Legation at San Salvador.
- William Nathan Storey, First Secretary (Commercial) at His Majesty's Embassy in Buenos Aires.
- John Walker, MBE, First Secretary (Commercial) at His Majesty's Embassy in Madrid.
- Charles Henry Arnold, Superintendent, Boys' Reformatory School, State of South Australia.
- Lieutenant-Colonel Arthur Thomas Harpham, MIEE, Postmaster-General, Southern Rhodesia.
- Major Ernest Sirdefield Harston, Honorary Secretary, British Empire Service League.
- Cecil Isadore Jacobs, MM, a solicitor in Bulawayo, and National President of the British Empire Service League, Southern Rhodesia.
- Herbert Edward Kinloch, Manager of the Shell Petroleum Company in Salisbury, Southern Rhodesia. For public services.
- Masterman David James MacKenzie, MBE, MB, ChB.(Ed.), Director of Medical Services, Bechuanaland Protectorate.
- Edward Walter Lionel Noakes, Deputy Speaker and Chairman of Committees, Legislative Assembly, Southern Rhodesia.
- Major Ernest William Pither, Financial Secretary, Overseas League.
- Frank Ernest Pittman, lately General Passenger Agent, Newfoundland Railway.
- William Thomas Smith, Secretary, Department of Justice, Southern Rhodesia.
- Reginald Arthur West, MA, Principal, Adelaide High School, State of South Australia.
- Reginald Walter Bastin, Indian Civil Service, District Magistrate, Mymensingh, Bengal.
- Denzil Arnold Bryan, Indian Civil Service, lately Secretary to the Honourable the Premier, Punjab.
- Oscar Lawrence Burrell, Indian Police, Assistant Inspector-General of Police, Madras.
- Roy Herbert Adams Burrell, Indian Police, District Superintendent of Police, Jubbulpore, Central Provinces and Berar.
- William Buchanan Calder, Indian Service of Engineers, Superintending Engineer, Communications Circle, Sind.
- Bernard Osborne Candy, Transmission Engineer, Standard Telephones and Cables, Limited (lately Technical Adviser in the Posts and Telegraphs Directorate).
- Commander (E) Henry John Creswell, Royal Indian Navy, Principal Officer, Mercantile Marine Department, Bombay.
- Major Hubert Joseph Curran, MB, BCh, Indian Medical Service, Principal, Medical School, Darbhanga, Bihar.
- Colonel Richard George, Indian Army, Deputy Military Adviser-in-Chief, Indian States Forces.
- Cyril Kenneth Kemp, Indian Police, Superintendent of Police, Anti-Corruption Department, United Provinces.
- Neville Hugh Lewis, Additional Deputy Military Accountant-General, Government of India.
- Henery Alexander Nesbitt Medd, Chief Architect, Central Public Works Department, Government of India.
- Eric Charles Mobbs, Indian Forest Service, Director of Forest Education, Forest Research Institute and Colleges.
- John Munro, Deputy Director-General, Directorate-General of Disposals, Department of Industries and Supplies, Government of India.
- John Austin Parks, FSI, Acting Chairman Improvement Trust, Calcutta, Bengal.
- Lindsay Arthur Patton-Row, Indian Police, District Superintendent of Police, Ahmedabad District, Bombay.
- Lieutenant-Colonel William Thomas Taylor, MB, BCh, Indian Medical Service, Deputy Director-General, Indian Medical Service (Stores).
- Lieutenant-Colonel Douglas Ralph Venning, MC, Indian Army, Commandant, South Waziristan Scouts, North-West Frontier Province.
- Tigrane David Boldy, Superintending Engineer, Burma Public Works Department (Electrical Branch).
- David Fishwick, Indian Civil Service, Additional Commissioner of Civil Supplies, Burma.
- Vernon FitzClarence Anderson, MD, MRCS, LRCP, DPH, DTM, Colonial Medical Service, Senior Medical Office, British Honduras.
- Richard Leslie Brohier, Assistant Surveyor General, Ceylon.
- Isaac Newton Camp, Deputy Director, Department of Land Settlement and Water Commissioners, Palestine.
- Lieutenant-Commander Frederick James Chambers, MBE, Royal Navy (Retired), Colonial Administrative Service, District Officer, Somaliland.
- Edgar Cuschieri, Treasurer, Malta.
- Herbert Fitz-Allan Bryan Davis. For public services in St. Vincent, Windward Islands.
- Alexander Hunter Munro Dryden, Colonial Police Service, Senior Superintendent of Police, Zanzibar.
- Sheikh Omar Fye, JP. For public services in the Gambia.
- Thomas William Hinch, Principal, Anglo-Chinese School, Singapore.
- Winston Ellis Holt, Colonial Education Service, Chief Inspector of Education, Nigeria.
- David Winn Hoodless, LMSSA, Colonial Medical Service, lately Principal of the Central Medical School, Suva, Fiji.
- George Henry Evans Hopkins, Senior Entomologist (Medical), Uganda.
- Paul Constantinou Kythreotis, Temporary Deputy Controller of Supplies, Transport and Marketing, Cyprus.
- John Ebenezer Clare Mcfarlane, Deputy Financial Secretary and Treasurer, Jamaica.
- Charles William Tachie-Menson. For public services in the Gold Coast.
- Wilfred Eric Stanley Merrett, BM, BCh, Colonial Medical Service, Acting Principal of the Medical School and Lecturer in Physiology, Nigeria.
- Ramparsad Neerunjun, Magistrate, Industrial Court, Mauritius.
- Ong Tiang Swee. For public services in Sarawak.
- Arthur Lawrence Pennington, Colonial Administrative Service, Deputy Provincial Commissioner, Tanganyika Territory.
- Frederick William Rant, Manager of the Anglo-Iranian Oil Company in the Aden Protectorate.
- John Harris Symons. For public services in Kenya.
- William Alma Frederick Wickhart, Deputy Head of the Shipping Department of the Crown Agents for the Colonies.

Honorary Officers

- Mir Suba Prakat Man Singh, Nepalese Officer attached to His Majesty's Legation at Katmandu.
- Dato Mahmud Bin Mat, Deputy Commissioner of Lands, MCS, Malayan Union.
- Dr. Soo Kim Lam, LMS (Singapore). For public services in the Malayan Union.
- Nathaniel David Oyerinde, Otun Bale of Ogbomosho (First Councillor to Chief), Nigeria.
- Krikor Solomon Krikorian, Senior Medical Officer, Palestine.

==== Member of the Order of the British Empire (MBE) ====
Military Division

Royal Navy

- Lieutenant (A) Edgar Grocock.
- Temporary Shipwright Lieutenant-Commander Frederick Lionel Hill.
- Instructor Lieutenant-Commander William Douglas Jenkin.
- Signal Lieutenant Albert Frank Lamble, (Retired).
- Lieutenant (QM) Horace Victor Layers, Royal Marines.
- Mr. Emrys Morgan, DSM, Temporary Acting Commissioned Stores Officer.
- Temporary Lieutenant-Commander (Sp.) Robert Beechey-Newman, Royal Naval Volunteer Reserve.
- Temporary Acting Lieutenant-Commander Cecil Albert Payne, Royal Naval Reserve.
- Lieutenant (S) Sidney Joe Edward Searle, (Retired).
- Lieutenant-Commander (E) John Sowray, (Retired).
- Temporary Acting Lieutenant-Commander (Sp.) Cyril Edward Wood, Royal Naval Volunteer Reserve.

Additional Members

- Mr. James Victor Thomas Rawlence, Temporary Warrant Engineer.
- Lieutenant Paul Francis Christopher Satow.

Army

- Captain (temporary) Horace Edward Anderson (271947), Royal Army Service Corps.
- Major (temporary) Leonard Ernest Andrews (1260139), General List.
- Major (Quartermaster) Charles Austen (66933), Corps of Royal Engineers.
- Major John Colston Babbage, MB, (75669), Royal Army Medical Corps.
- Major (temporary) Arthur Frederick Bacon (134780), The Wiltshire Regiment (Duke of Edinburgh's).
- Major (temporary) Francis Charles Shaw Bayliss (97797), Royal Regiment of Artillery.
- Major (Quartermaster) Percy Beard (108432), Royal Army Service Corps.
- No. 5820259 Warrant Officer Class I James Chalk, MM, The Suffolk Regiment.
- Major (temporary) George Henry Chambers, BA, (69065), Corps of Royal Engineers.
- Lieutenant-Colonel (local) Richard Gowen Collins (50936), The Duke of Wellington's Regiment (West Riding).
- Major (temporary) Benjamin Walter Cordwell (218882), General List.
- Major (temporary) Thomas William Edward Corrigan (328729), Royal Armoured Corps.
- No. 1061819 Warrant Officer Class I, Percy Edward Crack, Royal Regiment of Artillery.
- Captain (temporary) Michael James Stephen Cubbage (271459), Royal Regiment of Artillery.
- Captain (temporary) Gordon Currie (342565), Intelligence Corps.
- No. 274897 Warrant Officer Class II, John Alan Dally, Intelligence Corps.
- Captain (Quartermaster) Robert Charles Deboice Douglas (294294), Scots Guards.
- Captain (Quartermaster) David Dowey (325183), The Royal Inniskilling Fusiliers.
- Senior Commander (temporary) Jean Elizabeth Rivett-Drake (234025), Auxiliary Territorial Service.
- Captain (temporary) Wilfred John Elms (246868), General List.
- Major (temporary) Gerald Fitzgerald (257648), Royal Army Educational Corps.
- No. 7076200 Warrant Officer Class I Hugh Patrick Flood, The Royal Berkshire Regiment (Princess Charlotte of Wales's).
- Captain (temporary) Alan Freeman (314256), Corps of Royal Engineers.
- No. 5379367 Warrant Officer Class I Frederick Gibson, MC, MM, The East Yorkshire Regiment (The Duke of York's Own).
- Major (acting) Alfred William Colder (290993), Army Cadet Force.
- Captain (Quartermaster) Alexander Greenwood (248020), Scots Guards.
- Major William Tom Harris, MC, (8916), The Royal Scots (The Royal Regiment).
- Captain (temporary) Laurence Charles Hinton (277153), Royal Regiment of Artillery.
- No. 7262521 Warrant Officer Class I Leslie Roy Hitchcock, Royal Army Medical Corps.
- No. 7579260 Warrant Officer Class I John Nisbett Hogg, Royal Electrical and Mechanical Engineers.
- No. S/57379 Warrant Officer Class I Douglas Charles Hooker, Royal Army Service Corps.
- Major (temporary) William Alexander Howe (130922), Royal Regiment of Artillery.
- Major (temporary) Arthur Jacob Howes (199175), Royal Army Ordnance Corps.
- Major John Leslie Jeffree (275659), Army Cadet Force.
- Major Richard Keith Jones, MC, (62519), Royal Regiment of Artillery.
- Major (temporary) John Paul Kaestlin (162179), Royal Regiment of Artillery.
- Captain (Quartermaster) Jack Leach (257171), Royal Regiment of Artillery.
- No. 7685261 Warrant Officer Class I William McEvoy, Corps of Royal Military Police.
- No. 2716011 Warrant Officer Class I John McGarrity, Irish Guards.
- Major (temporary) Jack Cranstoun Metcalfe (118634), General List.
- Junior Commander (temporary) Moyra Miller (257915), Auxiliary Territorial Service.
- Captain Andrew Frank Barnett Milligan (308440), The Royal Scots Fusiliers.
- No. 2587439 Warrant Officer Class I James Milne, Royal Corps of Signals.
- Major (Quartermaster) Walter Patrick Mullane (66309), Royal Army Service Corps.
- Lieutenant Robert James Pickard (346941), Corps of Royal Engineers.
- Major (temporary) Edwin Alfred Powe (296829), Corps of Royal Engineers.
- Major and Paymaster (temporary Staff Paymaster 2nd class) Francis Henry Vivian Purcell (36755), Royal Army Pay Corps.
- Major (temporary) John Andrew Rankin (1151238), Royal Regiment of Artillery.
- Major (Quartermaster) Percy Rowden (67486), Royal Army Service Corps.
- Lieutenant Brian Annesley Seaward (295564), Corps of Royal Engineers.
- Major Eldred George Shales (260637), Royal Electrical and Mechanical Engineers.
- Major (temporary) John Gerald Shenstone (79744), Royal Regiment of Artillery.
- Major (temporary) Henry George Bobs Styran (131580), Reserve of Officers, The Royal Northumberland Fusiliers.
- Major (temporary) Norman Arthur Taylor (148670), Royal Regiment of Artillery.
- Captain (temporary) Albert Kenneth Wallis (130827), The East Yorkshire Regiment (The Duke of York's Own).
- Major (temporary) Cyril Joseph Wilson (133180), Corps of Royal Engineers.
- No. 7607826 Warrant Officer Class I Frank Winterbottom, Royal Electrical and Mechanical Engineers.
- Major and Staff Paymaster 2nd Class Arthur Wood (98014), Royal Army Pay Corps.
- Conductor Stuart James Gebbie, Indian Army Corps of Clerks.
- War Substantive Major Percy Frank Ray, Royal Indian Engineers.
- War Substantive Captain (Temporary Major) Leonard Charles Kennedy, Indian Army Corps of Clerks.
- Major Francis John Bayman, Indian Electrical and Mechanical Engineers.
- Assistant Paymaster Kaimakam Diran Bodossian, Transjordan Frontier Force.
- Captain George Noel de St. Croix, Ceylon Planters' Rifle Corps.
- Regimental Sergeant-Major Cecil John Fooks, Officer Commanding, Police Training School, Hong Kong.

Royal Air Force

- Acting Wing Commander Alec Knowles Fitton (67817), Royal Air Force Volunteer Reserve.
- Acting Wing Commander Peter Robert Gibson Lynch (49976).
- Squadron Leader Charles Warren, DFC, (33482).
- Acting Squadron Leader Stanley Herbert Brown (107554), Royal Air Force Volunteer Reserve.
- Acting Squadron Leader Eric John Furlong, DFC, (118833), Royal Air Force Volunteer Reserve.
- Acting Squadron Leader Harold Charles Room (62411), Royal Air Force Volunteer Reserve.
- Acting Squadron Leader Ernest Henry White (46036).
- Flight Lieutenant Percival Philip Burton (47372).
- Flight Lieutenant William Heaton (50870).
- Flight Lieutenant John Norman King Le Fleming-Shepherd (77497), Royal Air Force Volunteer Reserve.
- Flight Lieutenant James Wilson (46973).
- Acting Flight Lieutenant Robert Endell Charles Finch (182936), Royal Air Force Volunteer Reserve.
- Acting Flight Lieutenant Alfwyn Peach Verrinder (110002), Royal Air Force Volunteer Reserve.
- Flying Officer William Thomas Bolster (201112), Royal Air Force Volunteer Reserve.
- Warrant Officer Albert Arrowsmith (590759).
- Warrant Officer Martin Curnow Bassett (590170).
- Warrant Officer Philip Thomas Cook (516679).
- Warrant Officer Cecil Herbert Wellington Hall (591111).
- Warrant Officer Philip John Henry Tallamy (366456).
- Acting Flight Officer Muriel Fletcher (7648), Women's Auxiliary Air Force.

Civil Division

- George Adams, Senior Executive Officer, Air Ministry.
- Robert Stanley Allen, Honorary Secretary, Luton Rural District Savings Committee.
- Harry Aspinall, EM, Manager, Hemsworth Colliery, Yorkshire.
- Harold Nelson Back, Assistant Chief Constable, Surrey.
- Ernest Aubrey Bacon, Head of Section, Ministry of Works.
- Donald Alan Baird, Chief Designer, Nuffield Mechanizations Ltd., Birmingham.
- Alfred Albert Baldwin, Technical Assistant, Ministry of Pensions.
- George Harding Barlow, Labour Officer, North Riding War Agricultural Executive Committee.
- Mary Ann Barraclough, JP. For public services in the West Riding of Yorkshire.
- Marianne Louise Beazley, Secretary of the Women's Land Army for Dorset.
- Anne Muriel Wallace Belchem, Commander, First Aid Nursing Yeomanry (Women's Transport Service); Military Assistant to the Deputy Military Governor, Control Commission for Germany.
- William Bell, Superintendent of Signals, British Overseas Airways Corporation.
- Eliza Jane Boyd, JP, Chairman, Donaghadee Urban District Council.
- Ernest Vincent Brown, President, Local Committee of No's. 1359 and 1360 Squadrons, Air Training Corps.
- George Chadwin Brown, Assistant Accountant, HM Treasury (now serving in the Ministry of Defence).
- Reginald Smith Brown, Chief Metallurgist, Ryland Bros. Ltd., Warrington.
- Thomas Searle Brown, Chief Draughtsman, Clarke Chapman and Company Ltd., Gateshead.
- William Charles Brown, Senior Staff Officer, Admiralty.
- Lieutenant-Commander (S) William Thomas Brown, Royal Navy (retired). For public services in Gillingham, Kent.
- Thelma Mary Bertha Bryan, Director, William Bryan Ltd., London.
- Charles Frederick Bulmer, Secretary, Mediterranean Shipping Conference.
- Charles Stanley Burleton, Staff Officer, Ministry of Works.
- George Parkinson Burns, Senior Chief Clerk, HM Customs and Excise.
- Malcolm Wyatt Burt, Manager and Secretary of the Society of British Gas Industries.
- Charles Archibald Carter, BEM, Office Keeper, Prime Minister's Office.
- Elsie Mary Chalk, Clerical Officer, Dominions Office.
- Councillor Elsie Chamberlain, JP. For public services in Caernarvonshire.
- Ronald Chick, Area Secretary, Transport and General Workers' Union.
- John Turner Clark, Staff Officer, Scottish Education Department.
- Arthur Clarke, Chief Railway Inspector, Mersey Docks and Harbour Board.
- Thomas Clarke, Staff Clerk, Lord Chancellor's Office.
- William Joseph Clarke, Senior Staff Officer, Air Ministry.
- Alfred Henry Clinch. For services as Senior Shipping Assistant, Ministry of Transport.
- Philip Richard Clipsham, Staff Officer, Dominions Office.
- James Selwyn Cockcroft, Chairman, Hebden Royd and Hepton Savings Committee.
- Gladys Irene Cole, Senior Technical Officer, Board of Trade.
- Daisy Eveline Minnie Coleman, lately Superintendent Nurse, the Central Home, Leytonstone.
- Francis Norman Colthurst, Deputy Principal, Ministry of Labour and National Insurance, Northern Ireland.
- William Herbert Counter, Shop Superintendent, H. M. Hobson Components Ltd., Coventry.
- Laura Evelyn Crabtree, Postmistress, Wetherby, Yorkshire.
- Arnold Leslie Crewe, Staff Assistant, Southern Area, London and North Eastern Railway Company.
- Charles Crowfoot, Senior Experimental Officer, Royal Aircraft Establishment, Farnborough.
- Theodore John Culverwell, District Officer, HM Coastguard Station, Walton-on-the-Naze.
- John Cunningham, General Manager, Boiler Division, Ruston and Hornsby Ltd., Lincoln.
- Robert Alvin Dalzell, Honorary Secretary, Coleraine Local Savings Committee, Northern Ireland.
- Ernest Leonard Davies, Area Manager, South Wales, National Dock Labour Corporation Ltd.
- John Davies, Colliery Manager, Lucy Thomas Drift, Merthyr Tydfil.
- Nora Bryan Deane, Matron, Bristol Maternity Hospital.
- James Spencer Devey, JP, Chairman of the Local Employment Committee, Luton.
- Major David Devine, JP, Honorary Treasurer, Enniskillen Savings Group, Northern Ireland.
- James Dickinson, Honorary Secretary and Treasurer, Preston Comforts Fund.
- Alan James Dingley, Higher Executive Officer, Ministry of National Insurance.
- Lottie Dixon. For services to the Street Group Savings movement in South Lancashire.
- William Duffy, BEM, District Inspector, Royal Ulster Constabulary.
- William Eames. For services as Press Officer, Wales Region, Central Office of Information.
- Ernest Edwards, Staff Officer, General Post Office.
- Marion Ellice, Member of the Agricultural Executive Committee for Inverness (Mainland) and Nairn.
- Henry Wilfred Emerton, Secretary to the Admiral Superintendent, HM Dockyard, Devonport.
- Arthur Ernest England, Chief of the Engine Working Section, Traffic Department, Waterloo, Southern Railway Company.
- Albert Entwistle, Chief Executive Officer, Ministry of Supply.
- Robert Pughe Evans, Superintendent, Royal Ordnance Factory, Bishopton.
- John Stuart Everett, Senior Civilian Technical Officer, War Office.
- Sydney Ernest Fairlie, Works Superintendent, Sir W. G. Armstrong-Whirworth Aircraft Ltd.
- Thomas Fallon, BEM, Superintendent, Thames Division, Metropolitan Police.
- Grace Isabel Acheson Faris, Headmistress, Victoria College, Belfast.
- Major Richard Alexander Fawcett, MC, BEM, TD, Army Welfare Officer, Bradford Area.
- Henry Thomas Ferrier. For services in connection with Mobile Miniature Mass Radiography Units.
- Arthur Henry George Field, Assistant Engineer, Cardiff Telephone Area, General Post Office.
- John Finn, AMInstCE, Chief Assistant Engineer, Witham and Steeping Rivers Catchment Board.
- Captain Charles Arthur Freer Fowke, MC, Poultry Area Organiser, Ministry of Agriculture and Fisheries.
- Robert Charles Frederick, FRIC, Adviser on Applied Hygiene to the Medical Director-General of the Navy.
- Cecil Richard Fright, Telephone Manager, Reading, General Post Office.
- John Gaffney, Local Fuel Overseer, Chislehurst and Sidcup Urban District Council.
- Amy Gambier, lately Matron, Graylingwell Mental Hospital, Sussex.
- George Gardner, MC, FSA.(Scot.), Headmaster, The Kibble Approved School, Paisley.
- Violet Muriel Garner, Senior Woman Officer, No. 8 (Wales) Region, National Fire Service.
- Wilfred Charles Gaskin, Assistant Secretary, British European Airways Corporation.
- Margaret Efanwy George, Regional Organiser for Wales, Women's Voluntary Services.
- Alderman William George, Member of Monmouth War Agricultural Executive Committee.
- John Gibson, JP, Secretary and Superintendent, Preston and County of Lancaster Royal Infirmary.
- Leonard George Goddard, Divisional Surveyor, Hampshire County Council.
- Herbert Goodier, FCA, Secretary, Apparel Manufacturers' Association.
- George Edward Goodman, Senior Staff Officer, Ministry of Agriculture and Fisheries.
- David Nisbet Gray, Senior Chief Superintendent and Inspector, Mercantile Marine Office Service', Ministry of Transport.
- Arthur John Green, Senior Staff Officer, Board of Inland Revenue.
- Kenneth Cyril Henry Greene, Senior Staff Officer, Ministry of Supply.
- Marion Janet Greeves, Chairman and Organiser, St. John Ambulance Brigade Depot for Hospital Supplies and Forces Comforts, Portadown.
- Cyril Sidney Willis Grice, Scientific Officer, Ministry of Fuel and Power.
- George Llewhellin Griffiths, Divisional Maintenance Engineer (Scottish Division), British European Airways Corporation.
- Major Francis Boys Grinham, Senior Horticultural Officer, Imperial War Graves Commission.
- Ida Mary Groves, Vocational Guidance Officer, Kent County Council.
- Hilda Guest, Third Class Officer, Ministry of Labour and National Service.
- Edith Miranda Gwyer, employed in a Department of the Foreign Office.
- James Hall, Superintendent and Deputy Chief Constable, Roxburghshire Constabulary.
- Harold Edgar Hammett, Chief Enforcement Officer, Ministry of Fuel and Power.
- Ethel Hanley, JP, Chairman, Widnes Probation Committee.
- Loris Christian Hansen, Group Secretary, Transport and General Workers' Union.
- Charles Espin Hardwick, lately Chairman, No. 157 (Central Birmingham) Squadron Committee, Air Training Corps.
- George Cuthbert Hardy, Surveyor and Engineer, Beeston and Stapleford Urban District Council.
- James Harper. For services to the Belfast Mental Hospital Authority.
- George William Harris, Staff Officer, Ministry of Transport.
- Ernest Charles Hart, Staff Officer, HM Customs and Excise.
- Cecil Oscar Haven, Head of Section, Foreign Office.
- James William Heap, Lately Materials Inspector, North of England, Southern Railway Company.
- William Henry Hellmuth, Higher Clerical Officer, General Post Office.
- Annie Elizabeth Helme, JP, Chairman, Lancaster Local Employment Committee.
- William John Hepburn, Parks Superintendent, Hampton Court Palace, Ministry of Works.
- Frederick George Hewitt, Station Master, St. Pancras, London Midland and Scottish Railway Company.
- James Hicks, Higher Clerical Officer, Ministry of National Insurance.
- Alderman William Augustus Hillier, JP, President, Eton and District Savings Committee.
- Sidney Charles Hills, Area Secretary, Transport and General Workers' Union.
- Edward Henry Treffry Hoblyn, PhD, ARCS, FRIC, AMIChemE, Secretary, British Chemical Plant Manufacturers' Association.
- Gertrude Florence Hole, Headmistress, London County Council North Hackney Secondary School.
- Thomas Alfred Hole, Milk Inspector. Ministry of Health.
- John Henry Holme, Manager, Wigan Employment Exchange, Ministry of Labour and National Service.
- Frederick Richard Davies Horn, Deputy Superintendent, Northern Area Branch, HM Stationery Office.
- Agatha Mary Hosking, Honorary Secretary, Warwickshire, Incorporated Sailors' Soldiers' and Airmen's Help Society.
- Merle Frances Houghton, Assistant Administrator for London, Women's Voluntary Services.
- George Edward Charles Howes, Chief Designer, Fire Control Apparatus, R. W. Crabtree and Sons, Ltd., Leeds.
- William Hudson, Divisional Chief Engineer, South Eastern Division, National Coal Board.
- Joseph Hunter, Under-manager, Old Meadows Colliery, Bacup.
- Robert Gladstone Hunter, Secretary, Northern Road Transport Owners Association, Ltd.
- Ethel Hutchings, RRC, Matron, Ministry of Pensions Hospital. Musgrove Park, Taunton.
- Ernest Henry Huxford, Naval Store Officer, Admiralty.
- Norman Monk Ince, Staff Officer, Board of Inland Revenue.
- Victor Herbert Ingram, Clerk of Accounts, Admiralty Registry, Supreme Court of Judicature.
- Isabella Jackson, Principal Clerk, Ministry of Pensions.
- David Jeffreys, Chief Collector of Taxes, Board of Inland Revenue.
- Martha Ellen Jewers, Chief Quartermaster, National Services Club, Bournemouth.
- Arthur Henry Jones, Superintendent of Works, Ministry of Works.
- Ivor Hywel Jones, Assistant Regional Controller, Wales, Board of Trade.
- James Thomas Jones, Food Executive Officer, Port Talbot, Ministry of Food.
- Thomas Duncan Kay, Works Manager, Boase Spinning Company Ltd., Fife.
- Sydney Thomas Kelly, Museum Superintendent, Science Museum.
- Arthur John Kennedy, Senior Executive Officer, Foreign Office.
- John William Kennedy, Chairman, Sailors' Friendly League, British Sailors' Society, Belfast.
- Edward Robert Lamburn, Deputy Executive Officer, Warwickshire War Agricultural Executive Committee.
- Robert James Layland, Master of Islington Institution, London County Council.
- Harry Litherland, Chairman of the Manchester and District Potato Committee.
- Kathleen Leah Macaldin, Voluntary Organiser, Empire Services Club, Cairo.
- Thomas Anderson McCorkindale, Deputy Fire Force Commander, National Fire Service, Western (No. 2) Area of Scotland.
- Thomas Hugh MacDonald, Clerk, Lisburn Urban District Council.
- William Alexander Macdonald, Staff Officer, Ministry of Civil Aviation.
- James Walker McGillivray, Executive Officer to the Kincardineshire Agricultural Executive Committee.
- Helen Mackay McKenzie, ARIC, Research Chemist, Alex. Pine and Sons Ltd., Bucksburn, Aberdeenshire.
- Agnes Watson McLeod, Chief Clerk, Telephone Manager's Office, Lancaster, General Post Office.
- David Holliday McMath, Traffic Assistant, Leith Docks.
- John McMillan, JP, Shipyard Labour Supply Officer, East of Scotland, Ministry of Labour and National Service.
- Robert Macpherson, Member, Edinburgh Savings Committee.
- Kathleen Muriel Maden, Clerical Officer, Home Office.
- Mary Elizabeth Mansell, Secretary of the Women's Land Army for Denbighshire.
- David John Marr, Ex-soldier Clerk, War Office.
- William Henry Milnes Marsden, JP, Member, Derby Savings Committee.
- Alfred Marsh, County Health Inspector, Essex County Council.
- Norman Hubert Mattock, Headmaster, The Shawbury (Approved) School, Birmingham.
- James Forrester Millar, President, Stirling Branch of the St. Andrew's Ambulance Association.
- Thomas Lowe Millar, Member, Edinburgh Savings Committee.
- Edward Cyril Mills, District House Coal Officer, London Region.
- Herbert Mobbs, Honorary Machinery Officer, Northamptonshire War Agricultural Executive Committee.
- Alderman Basil Monk, JP, Chairman, Croydon District Production Committee of the London and South Eastern Regional Board for Industry.
- James Guthrie Monteath, Governor, HM Prison, Greenock.
- The Reverend Francis Benvenoto Monti, Pastor of the Baptist Church, Shepherds Bush, London.
- Richard Charles Morris, Commandant, Metropolitan Special Constabulary.
- Thomas Muir, Division Officer, Ordnance Survey, Ministry of Agriculture and Fisheries.
- Dorothy Stanton Murphy, Administrator, County of London, Women's Voluntary Services.
- Joseph William Myers, Manager of Iron and Steel Foundries, Vickers-Armstrongs Ltd.
- Wilfrid Naylor. For services as Assistant Rolling Stock Controller, London and North Eastern Railway Company.
- William Newall, District House Coal Officer, Scottish Region.
- Frank Newport, Works Manager, Board of Trade Carbide Factory, Kenfig, Glamorganshire.
- William Henry Nicholls, Chief Electrical Engineer, Aldershot District, War Office.
- William Matthew Noble. For services to the Quaker Educational Settlement in Rhondda.
- Fred Knowles Nuttall, Chief Staff Officer, Board of Trade.
- David Nye, Manager, White's Cement Works, Kent.
- Frederick William Francis Outram, Higher Clerical Officer, Ministry of Health.
- Clarence Bertram Parkes, LRIBA, Secretary, West Midland Group on Post War Reconstruction and Planning.
- Thomas Reginald Parsons, Staff Officer, Colonial Office.
- William Henry Penson, Executive Assistant, London Passenger Transport Board.
- Florence Winifred Midwood Dyson Perrins. For services to the Personal Service League in Malvern.
- James Robert Phillips, Assistant Administrative Officer, War Office.
- Herbert Andrew Pitman, Chief Clerk, Territorial Army and Air Force Association of the County of London.
- William Henry Ponsford, lately Unit Controller, Road Haulage Organisation.
- Doris Isabel Postle, Senior Staff Officer, Ministry of Food.
- George Stanley Preston, Department Superintendent, Plessey Company Ltd., Ilford.
- Joan Treffry Prideaux, Assistant, Prime Minister's Office.
- Ingrid Prytz, Secretary, National Camps Corporation.
- Leonard Raftery, Chairman, Southwark Committee, Air Training Corps.
- Edith Ramsay. For public services in Stepney.
- Mary Dorothea Whiting Ramsey, Secretary, National Old People's Welfare Committee of the National Council of Social Service.
- George Charles Ransley, Grade I Clerk, Malta, War Office.
- John Reddington, Vice-Chairman, Scunthorpe Local Employment Committee.
- Joseph Allen Reeves, Local Fuel Overseer, Stoke-on-Trent, Staffordshire.
- Robert Scott Reid, MB, ChB, Admiralty Surgeon and Agent.
- Grace Margery Isabella Reynolds, JP, Honorary Secretary, Camberley and Frimley Cadet Corps.
- John Oswell Morgan Richards, First Class Officer, Wales Regional Office, Ministry of Labour and National Service.
- Archibald Alexander Ritchie, General Secretary, St. Andrew Order of Ancient Free Gardeners Friendly Society.
- Agnes Helena Muriel Roberts, Controller of Typists, Ministry of Labour and National Service.
- Edward Ernest Roberts, Senior Executive Officer, Ministry of National Insurance.
- Mary Silyn Roberts, lately Secretary, North Wales District Workers' Educational Association.
- May Kathleen Robins, Staff Clerk, Ministry of Labour and National Service.
- Frederick Victor Rolfe, Chief Building Inspector, Southern Railway Company.
- Edgar Walter Rooksby, Staff Officer, Ministry of Food.
- Thomas William Roper, Staff Officer, Assistance Board.
- Thomas Henry Rosser, Labour and Welfare Officer, Blackstone Ltd., Stamford, Lincolnshire.
- Alderman William George Row, JP. For public services in Dartmouth.
- Phyllis Margaret Rumbold, Clerical Officer, Ministry of Transport.
- Ernest Owen Sadler, Chief Officer, Parks, Cemeteries and Allotments Department, Sheffield.
- John Cecil Sheffield. For services to the Civil Defence Association in Edmonton.
- Robert Harry Shipway, Victualling Store Officer, Royal Naval Victualling Depot, Sydney.
- Councillor Fred Siddall, District Organiser, Amalgamated Engineering Union.
- Arthur Abraham Sigsworth, Works Manager, E. Curran Eng. Ltd., Cardiff.
- Harry George Ernest Silver, Assistant Chief Inspector, Ministry of Supply.
- Dorothy Simpson, Headmistress, The Park Infants School, Doncaster.
- John Sloman, Higher Clerical Officer, Air Ministry.
- Thomas Roberts Smith, Higher Executive Officer, India Office.
- Winifred Mary Smith, Clerical Officer, Office of the Lord President of the Council.
- Ethel Isabel Snowden, Honorary Divisional Secretary, Northampton, Soldiers' Sailors' and Airmen's Families Association.
- Frank Leslie Burgess Soar, Staff Officer, Ministry of Transport.
- Norman Ivor Sparks, Senior Staff Officer, Board of Inland Revenue.
- Thomas John Stephenson, Deputy Principal, Ministry of Finance, Northern Ireland.
- Harold Stevens, Honorary Publicity Officer, Sunderland Savings Committee.
- Walter Stonex, JP, Commandant, Salford Special Constabulary.
- Edward Walter James Street, Inspector, Class I, Ministry of Supply.
- Robert Arthur Strong, Instructor in charge of the Gardening Centre, Saffron Walden.
- Dorothy Jean, Viscountess Suirdale, Vice-President, County of London Branch, British Red Cross Society.
- Katharine Barclay Tait, Welfare Food Officer, Women's Voluntary Services, Edinburgh.
- John Richard Tanner, Higher Clerical Officer, Ministry of Education.
- Harry Norman Taylor, Senior Staff Officer, Ministry of Agriculture and Fisheries.
- William Taylor, Senior Executive Officer, Board of Trade.
- William Taylor, lately Unit Controller, Road Haulage Organisation, Buckie.
- Thomas Thomas, JP, Member of the Carmarthen War Agricultural Executive Committee.
- Edward Campbell Thomson, Clerk to Traffic Commissioners, Scotland, Ministry of Transport.
- Jean Henderson Thomson, Ward Sister, Ashludie Sanatorium, Monifieth, Angus.
- Herbert Toms, United Kingdom Liaison Officer for Labour, Dublin, Ministry of Labour and National Service.
- Hannah Croft Turnbull, Assistant Matron, Monsall Hospital, Manchester.
- James Ronald Turner, Assistant Regional Manager, South Eastern Region, War Damage Commission.
- Reginald Foster Turner, Regional Supply Storage Officer, Cardiff, Ministry of Supply.
- Frank William Thomas Turness, Staff Officer, Home Office.
- Florence Mabel Tutte, Corps Superintendent, Southampton, St. John Ambulance Brigade.
- Grace Muriel Tyrrell, Staff Officer, Ministry of Food.
- Frederick Grange Umpleby, AMIMechE, Senior Assistant, Chief Mechanical Engineer's Department, Derby, London Midland and Scottish Railway Company.
- Francis Edward Vaughan, Manager of the Distribution Office, Rubber Trade Association.
- Henry George Vincent. For services in organising factory concerts in Staffordshire.
- Percy Nevill Waddington, Higher Clerical Officer, Ministry of Supply.
- Mary Elizabeth Waiters, Superintendent of Typists, Ministry of Works.
- Harry Edwin Watson, Staff Officer, Foreign Office.
- Laura Mary Emeline Watson, Private Secretary to the President of the Federation of British Industries.
- William Brearley Wells, Chief Executive Officer, Ministry of Fuel and Power.
- William Welsford, Manager, Furniture Factories, Co-operative Wholesale Society Ltd.
- Joseph James Went, Auditor, Exchequer and Audit Department.
- Richard Thomas Weston, Regional Secretary, Northern Counties, National Federation of Building Trades Operatives.
- Harry Whitaker, Head of Branch, Tithe Redemption' Commission.
- Alfred Sidney White, lately employed in a Department of the Foreign Office.
- Thomas Whittaker, Senior Experimental Officer, Air Ministry.
- James Wilde, lately Staff Officer, Ministry of Transport.
- Mabel Wilkins, Controller of Typists, Board of Trade.
- Robert Wilkinson, Assistant Postmaster, Head Post Office, Belfast.
- Jack Williams, Personnel Manager, Standard Telephones and Cables Ltd., London.
- William Ernest Willshaw, AMIEE, Research Physicist, General Electric Company, Ltd.
- Joyce Elizabeth Wilson, lately Senior Assistant, HM Treasury.
- John William Yerrell, Secretary, National Union of Distributive and Allied Workers Approved Society.
- Margaret Elizabeth Barraclough, on the staff of the Special Commissioner in South East Asia.
- Arthur Temple Blackwood, formerly British Vice-Consul at Baltimore.
- Robert Thomas Blaney, Personal Assistant to the Counsellor (Commercial) at His Majesty's Embassy in Bagdad.
- Edward Leonard Blundell, on the staff of the Special Commissioner in South East Asia.
- Dora Helen Cockburn, Assistant Information Officer at His Majesty's Embassy in Mexico City.
- William Edwin Cornish, British Vice-Consul at Milan.
- Edwin Nowell Dempster, formerly British Vice-Consul at Rabat, (now His Majesty's Consul at Nantes.)
- Major Leslie Bland Dufton, MC, British Vice-Consul at Houston.
- Reverend Josepn William Dunbar, MA, Chaplain of the British Embassy Church m Pans.
- Alexander Gilbert Fenton, Audit Inspector, Sudan Government.
- Frank Olov August Henry Finney, Chief Clerk, Commercial Secretariat at His Majesty's Legation in Stockholm.
- Lieutenant (Temporary Captain) Roland Philip Gale, attached to a Department of the Foreign Office.
- Phyllis Josephine Gerson. For services under the Jewish Committee for Relief Abroad.
- James Ellis Hartley, until recently British Vice-Consul at Lyons, (now serving in Roumania.)
- Denise Eileen Lester, British subject resident in Portugal.
- Alice Maureen Lowe, attached to a Department of the Foreign Office.
- John McKenzie, PhD, Second Secretary at His Majesty's Legation at Reykjavik.
- William Brice Milton, Third Secretary (Commercial) at His Majesty's Embassy in Madrid.
- Muriel Gladys Nimmo, on the staff of His Majesty's Embassy in Cairo.
- William Hamilton Ponton, until recently British Vice-Consul at Bocas del Toro.
- Alfred Roberts, until recently Deputy Director of the Information Department of His Majesty's Embassy at Buenos Aires.
- Leila Seeley. For services with the (Indian Red Cross in South East Asia.
- Christopher Broughton Sharman. For services with the British Red Cross Society in South East Asia.
- Walter John Turner, British subject resident in Persia.
- Arthur Vivian Waddell, attached to the British Far Eastern Broadcasting Service, Singapore.
- Miriam Gwyneth Wallis, Assistant Commissioner, the Central European Commission of British Red Cross Society in Austria.
- Anthony Claud Woolrych, British subject resident in Denmark.
- Doris Jean Bannigan. For social welfare services, especially in connexion with the Legacy Club, in the State of South Australia.
- Lily May Collins, employed at Government House, St. John's, Newfoundland, for many years.
- Lilian Elizabeth Connolly, a qualified nurse and midwife of Salisbury, Southern Rhodesia. For services to the coloured community.
- Dorothy Lucy Deacon, Staff Matron, Department of Public Health, Southern Rhodesia.
- Alphonsus Gregory Duggan, Honorary President, Newfoundland Federation of Labour.
- Captain Charles William Duncombe, British South Africa Police. For services in connexion with Their Majesties' visit to Southern Rhodesia.
- Stewart Fitz Finnis, Assistant Native Commissioner, Rusapi, Southern Rhodesia.
- Thomas William Fraser, Assistant District Officer, Basutoland.
- Harold William Groom, Assistant Postmaster, Bulawayo, Southern Rhodesia.
- Kathleen Helene Hilfers. For social welfare services in the State of South Australia.
- Percy Richard Burt Hinde, Under-Secretary, Department of Agriculture and Lands, and Chairman of the Land Settlement Board, Southern Rhodesia.
- James Eric McKee. For services in connexion with patriotic and charitable organisations in the State of South Australia.
- Mabel Marryat. For social welfare services to service and ex-servicemen in the State of South Australia.
- Jessie Dorothy Morgan, lately an Inspector in the (Department of Education, Southern Rhodesia.
- Cecil Reginald Morris, Warden of the Municipality of Kentish, State of Tasmania.
- Francis John Petch, a former Chairman of the Loxton District Council, State of South Australia. For voluntary services to local government over many years.
- William Charles Quinton, Parliamentary Librarian, State of South Australia.
- Captain Ernest William Richens, British South Africa Police. For services in connexion with Their Majesties' visit to Southern Rhodesia.
- William Laurence Smith, formerly Private Secretary to the Prime Minister of Southern Rhodesia.
- Henry William Stone. For services to the shipbuilding industry of Newfoundland.
- Marjory McNab Veats. For social welfare services in Southern Rhodesia.
- Mabel Gertrude Worrall, a school teacher in Newfoundland for over forty-three years.
- Doreen Elphick (wife of Mr. E. de B. Elphick, Agent and Chief Engineer, The Madras Electric Supply Corporation, Limited), Madras.
- Nellie Halls, 24588 Welfare Officer (Lieutenant), British Red Cross attached to Indian Red Cross.
- Arthur John Bennison, Civilian Voluntary Service, Coimbatore.
- Vernon Robert Bowler, Acting Principal Executive Officer, India Store Department, Office of the High Commissioner for India. Major Herbert Collershaw, Executive Engineer, Internal, Calcutta Telephones District, Posts and Telegraphs Department.
- William Francis Corfield, Higher Clerical Officer, Accounts Department, Office of the High Commissioner for India, London.
- Peter Crombie, Indian Civil Service, Deputy Secretary to the Government of Madras in the Finance Department.
- Charles Edward Dench, Assistant Signal Engineer, East Indian Railway, Lucknow.
- Alan Campbell Drury, Works Manager, Rifle Factory, Ishapore.
- Stephen Garvin, Indian Civil Service, Collector and District Magistrate, Kanara District, Bombay.
- Captain Harold Percival Hall, Indian Political Service, Director of Food Supplies and Deputy Secretary, Revenue, Baluchistan.
- Ralph Ingham Hallows, Indian Political Service, lately Political Agent, Muscat.
- Hugh Owen Hay, Government Contractor, Rawalpindi, Punjab.
- Captain Nugent Davy Jekyll, MB, BCh, MRCS, Indian Medical Service, Agency Surgeon and Medical Officer, Chitral State Scouts, North-West Frontier Province.
- Lieutenant-Colonel Jeffrey William Campbell Lincoln-Gordon, Deputy Postmaster-General, Bengal Circle, Calcutta.
- Gordon Mondi Macleod, Assistant Superintendent of Police, Andaman and Nicobar Islands.
- Hugh Bellasis Martin, Indian Civil Service, District Magistrate and Collector, Bihar.
- William McGlashan, Mechanical Superintendent, Karachi Port Trust.
- Chandra Sinha Mehta, General Manager, Mewar State Railway, Udaipur (Mewar).
- Mervyn Nowland, Officer Supervisor, General Staff Branch, General Headquarters, India.
- Harry Perrett, Secretary, Sandes Soldier's Home, Lucknow.
- Captain Archibald James Colquohoun Richardson, Indian Army (retired), Lucknow, United Provinces.
- Gerald Columba Ryan, Indian Police, Assistant Director, Intelligence Bureau, Home Department, Government of India.
- Alfred Edwin Shields, Indian Civil Service, Collector and District Magistrate, Dharwar District, Bombay.
- Alan Forrest Stark, Member of the Legislative Assembly, Secretary, European Group Corporation, Calcutta, Bengal.
- Robert Swinney Swann, Indian Civil Service, Deputy Commissioner, Sambalpur, Orissa.
- David Alexander Telfer, lately Deputy Textile Commissioner, Office of the Textile Commissioner, Bombay.
- James Annan Wilson, District Locomotive Superintendent, Oudh-Tirhut Railway, Gonda.
- Captain Gerald Edward McDonald, Indian Army Medical Corps.
- Terence Edgar Menzies Cameron, Secretary to the Chief Railway Commissioner, Burma Railways.
- Ruth Donnison, lately Honorary Magistrate, Rangoon.
- Vincent Ernest William Stewart, Executive Engineer, Public Works Department, Federated Shan States.
- Krishnalal Vithaldas Adalja, MB, BS. For public and social welfare services in Kenya.
- James Wellington Kwaku Appiaii. For public services in the Gold Coast.
- Eileen Attfield. For services with the St. John Ambulance Brigade in South East Asia.
- Freda Alice Brough. For welfare services in the Gambia.
- Thales Cababe, Postmaster-General, Cyprus.
- Jennie Barbara Calderwood. For services with the British Red Cross Society in South East Asia.
- Cecily Campbell. For services with the St. John Ambulance Brigade in South East Asia.
- Chan Mak Heung, Divisional Officer, Auxiliary Fire Service, Hong Kong.
- Chan Peng Sim, Assistant Labour Officer, Singapore.
- Ivy Mary Collins. For welfare services in Northern Rhodesia.
- Sundaram Bagyam Daniel, Supervisor, Audit Department, Aden Protectorate.
- Vivian Charles Byers de Gray, BEM, Acting Superintendent of Police, Malta.
- D. Des Quartiers. For services with the British Red Cross Society in South East Asia.
- C. J. Ensor. For services with the St. John Ambulance Brigade in South East Asia.
- E. Fernandes. For services with the St. John Ambulance Brigade in South East Asia.
- Maryl Christine FitzHenry. For welfare services in Northern Rhodesia.
- Douglas Henry Franklin, Assistant Engineer, Posts and Telegraphs Department, Palestine.
- Adelaide Gladys Trimingham, Lady Hall. For welfare services in Bermuda.
- John Thomas Hardy, Assistant Traffic Officer, Nigerian Railway.
- Edward William Horsey, Secretary, Obuasi Sanitary Board, Gold Coast.
- John Henry Ingham, Colonial Administrative Service, Assistant Secretary, Nyasaland.
- Ernest Oswald Jones, Engineering Inspector, Crown Agents for the Colonies.
- Alice May Keyser, ARRC, Clerk, Grade "A", Secretariat, Kenya.
- Olive Rubina Kieffer. For welfare services in British Honduras.
- Setariki Mateiyalona Koto. For public services in Fiji.
- V. M. Leather. For services with the St. John Ambulance Brigade in South East Asia.
- Annie Isabel Leighton, Senior Health Visitor, Tanganyika Territory.
- William McCormack, Senior Chief Officer, Prisons Department, Mauritius.
- James Stenson Mcdonald, Commandant, Polish Refugee Settlement, Koja, Uganda.
- Alice Christina Miller, Lately Colonial Nursing Service, Matron, Zanzibar Hospital.
- Phyllis Morrison. For services with the British Red Cross Society in South East Asia.
- Njiri wa Karanja, Chief, Fort Hall, Kenya.
- Joseph O'Connor, First Assistant to the Colonial Secretary, Trinidad.
- Ernest Ottey Panton, JP. For social and public services in the Cayman Islands, Jamaica.
- Frazie Papazoglou, Social Welfare Officer, Medical Department, Cyprus.
- Bernard Percival Peiris, LLB, Second Assistant Legal Draftsman, Ceylon.
- Abdul Rahim, Senior Headman, Malacca.
- Lilian Muriel Ralston. For services with the First Aid Nursing Yeomanry in South East Asia.
- Peggy Ratliff. For services with the British Red Cross Society in South East Asia.
- Ann Robb. For services with the British Red Cross Society in South East Asia.
- Vincent William Soltau, Pilot, British Overseas Airways Corporation, Tanganyika Territory.
- Tan Hock Aun, Assistant Registrar, Supreme Court, Penang, Malayan Union.
- Gladys Victoria, Lady Tarbat. For services with the British Red Cross Society in South East Asia.
- Temonggong Koh, Penghulu of Rejang River, Sarawak.
- Charles Swain Thompson, Postmaster, Bahamas.
- Barjor Eduljee Wadia. For public services in the Seychelles.
- Laureston Hewley Wharton, MRCS, LRCP, Medical Superintendent, Leprosy Hospital, British Guiana.
- Ananda Corrine Wijewardene. For services with the British Red Cross Society in South East Asia.
- Edward Colmar Wood, Acting Superintendent, Lydda Airport, Palestine.
- Lieutenant-Commander Arthur Ernest Worby, Royal Naval Volunteer Reserve. For services to aviation in St. Vincent, Windward Islands.
- James Akinola Wright. For public services in Sierra Leone.
- Yeung Kai Hi, Assistant Secretary, Medical Department, Hong Kong.

Honorary Members

- Abdullah Mullah Saleh, Secretary to His Highness the Ruler of Kuwait.
- Haji Abdul Rahman Bin Tubid, Penghulu of Kuala Klawang, Malayan Union.
- Sheikh Ahmed Naser Batati, Military Secretary to Quaiti Government, Aden.
- Samuel Adedigba Ojo, Assistant Secretary, Clerk of Legislative Council, Nigeria.
- Thomas King Ekundayo Phillips, Organist, Cathedral Church of Christ, Lagos, Nigeria.
- Henry Freijah, Office Superintendent (Chief Clerk, Mechanical Branch), Palestine.
- Lutfi Attallah, Clerical Officer, Department of Migration, Palestine.
- Haji Ibrahim Egal. For public services with the British Somaliland Military Administration.

=== Order of the Companions of Honour (CH) ===
- James Bone, lately London Editor of the Manchester Guardian. For services to journalism.
- John William Robertson Scott, JP, Author, Founder and lately Editor of The Countryman.

=== Companion of the Imperial Service Order (ISO) ===
Home Civil Service

- Arthur Frederick Beal, Senior Regional Officer, Ministry of Fuel and Power.
- Henry Francis Clive Bence, Assistant Director of Accounts, Air Ministry.
- William Birrell, General Inspector, Department of Health for Scotland.
- Harry Cranwell, lately Engineer Surveyor in Chief, Ministry of Transport.
- Albert Crossley Dodd, MBE, Senior Principal Clerk, Ministry of Pensions.
- Albert William Douglas, Deputy Director of Audit, Exchequer and Audit Department.
- Arthur Joseph Edwards, MBE, lately Head of the Patent Division, Contract and Purchase Department, Admiralty.
- Clyde Bernard Fitzgerald, Senior Staff (Officer, (Department of Scientific land Industrial Research.
- George Herbert Flew, Principal Clerk, Public Works Loan Board.
- Thomas Gardener, Accountant, Prison Commission.
- Herbert Harding, Principal Examiner, Board of Trade.
- George William Hearn, Deputy Accountant-General, Ministry of Supply.
- Lillian Mary Woodley Hill, lately Principal, (Ministry of Education.
- George Howard Jones, MC, Senior Architect, Ministry of Works.
- William Lee, Chief Executive Officer, Ministry of Food.
- Robert Preston Lewin, Waterguard Inspector, Board of Customs and Excise.
- James Hamilton Logan, Deputy Comptroller of Stamps and Taxes (Scotland), Board of Inland Revenue.
- Percy Robert Mellors, Deputy Regional Director, London Postal Region, General Post Office.
- Alexander Jardine Morrison, Chief Executive Officer, Ministry of National Insurance.
- Arthur Frederick Orchard, MBE, Chief Executive Officer, Foreign Office.
- Thomas Reginald Oswin, Accountant and Receiver-General, Office of the Commissioners of Crown Lands.
- Edith Moorhouse Parker, Assistant Regional Controller, Ministry of Labour and National Service.
- Arthur Reginald Poole, MBE, Principal, Ministry of Agriculture and Fisheries.
- Charles Romeril de St. Paer, Chief Executive Officer, Assistance Board.
- George Thomas Williams, Inspector of Audit, National Insurance Audit Department.

Dominion Civil Services

- Charles Edward Cox, Secretary, Attorney-General's Department, State of Tasmania.
- Percival Alfred Driscoll, Secretary, Public Health Department, State of Tasmania.
- Charles Frederick Taylor, lately Collector of Customs, Class I, Newfoundland.

Indian Civil Services

- Basil Stanley Eaton Gow, Office Superintendent, Locomotive and Carriage and Wagon Administrative Offices, Bombay, Baroda and Central India Railway, Ajmer.
- Albert Henry Leamon, Officiating Deputy Director, Communications, Civil Aviation Directorate, Government of India.
- Leslie Herbert Spinks, Assistant Secretary to the Honourable the Resident at Hyderabad and Treasury Officer, Hyderabad (Deccan).
- Malcolm James Allan Staggs, MBE, Principal Entitlement Officer and Ex-officio Deputy Secretary, Pensions Branch, Defence Department, Government of India.

Colonial Service

- Donald Cormack, Regional Director, Posts and Telegraphs Department, Kenya.
- Albert Babbington Ghunney, Assistant Controller of Posts, Gold Coast.
- Edward Harding, Assistant Accountant (African), Nigeria.
- William Irving Howell, lately Marketing Officer, Nevis, Leeward Islands.
- Ephraim Krasnansky, Chief Clerk, District Office, Palestine.
- Horace James Mackintosh, Revenue Inspector, Gibraltar.
- Joezer Christian Oldfield, Postmaster, Freetown, Sierra Leone.
- Charles John Roe, General Secretary, Public Works Department, Hong Kong.
- Bryce Otterbein Smith, Controller of Post Office Savings Banks, British Guiana.

=== Kaisar-i-Hind Medal ===
In Gold

- Sister Mary Elizabeth Aftentranger, Sister Superior, St. Anne's Hospital, Bezwada, Kistna District, Madras.
- Carol Jameson, FACS, FRCS, Vice-Principal, Missionary Medical College for Women, Vellore, North Arcot District, Madras.
- The Right Reverend Richard Dyke Acland, Bishop of Bombay.

=== British Empire Medal (BEM) ===
Military Division

Royal Navy

- Chief Joiner Jack Caudrey Abraham, P/MX 45760.
- Chief Petty Officer Writer (Temporary) Douglas Foch Billing, D/MX 55435.
- Chief Petty Officer Steward John Bonnici, E/L 6697.
- Company Sergeant Major William James Boobyer, Depot/X-40, Royal Marines.
- Petty Officer Wren Writer Mabel Louise Bowman, 2604, Women's Royal Naval Service.
- Petty Officer Henry Robert Burlingham, C/JX 146226.
- Chief Petty Officer Stoker Mechanic Carmelo Camilleri, E/KX 78821.
- Chief Petty Officer (Temporary) Frederick Arthur Ching, D/J 109869.
- Bandmaster First Class (Acting Quartermaster Sergeant) Albert Edward Collier, R.M.B.2414.
- Chief Shipwright Alexander William Davidson, P/MX 50076.
- Petty Officer Cook (O) William James Dench, P/MX 51477.
- Petty Officer Wren Writer Marjorie Vansittart Dickinson, 20855, Women's Royal Naval Service.
- Quartermaster Sergeant Richard James Dixon, PO.X. 1155, Royal Marines.
- Sick Berth Chief Petty Officer Francis Gallagher, P/MX 45948.
- Sergeant Sydney Frank Hills, PO.X.4175, Royal Marines.
- Able Seaman (Pensioner) Frederick James Jones, D/J 23900.
- Master-at-Arms Roger Henry Le Page, P/MX 47287.
- Chief Engineroom Artificer Donald Matheson Macgregor, P/MX 667630.
- Chief Petty Officer Writer Reuben John Marshall, C/M 37710.
- Master-at-Arms Reginald Arthur Page, DSM, P/MX 667669.
- Petty Officer Telegraphist William Henry Parker, P/J 107811.
- Petty Officer Stoker Mechanic Albert Henry Robertshaw, C/KX 90032.
- Stores Chief Petty Officer (Temporary) Stanley Spencer Sims, C/MX 56407.
- Chief Petty Officer Fred Spearman, P/J 96701.
- Chief Petty Officer Air Mechanic (E) Eric Richard Gordon Boyd Todd, Lee/FX 80046.
- Chief Wren Ethel Mildred Walsh, 8117, Women's Royal Naval Service.
- Chief Petty Officer Stoker Mechanic David John White, D/KX 82369.
- Acting Petty Officer William Catherall, C/JX.153487.
- Acting Yeoman of Signals (Temporary) Maurice John Chandler, D/JX. 152348.
- Engine Room Artificer Third Class James Leonard Clark, C/S/MX.4OO.
- Petty Officer Benjamin Hennings, P/JX. 128955.
- Acting Petty Officer Stoker Mechanic William Salmond, D/KX.81395.

Army

- No. 3544 Company Sergeant-Major Ahmed Mahomed, Somalia Gendarmerie.
- No. GC 13094 Drum-Major Salifu Ali, The Gold Coast Regiment, Royal West African Frontier Force.
- No. 6216420 Warrant Officer Class II (acting) Kenneth Alfred Baldwin, Royal Corps of Signals.
- No. 14345583 Sergeant Jack Percy Bishop, Royal Armoured Corps.
- No. 14603858 Sergeant Valentine Alexander Botwright, Corps of Royal Military Police.
- No. 14752820 Sergeant (acting) Gerald Raymond Burt, Corps of Royal Engineers.
- No. 4689062 Warrant Officer Class II (acting) Alexander Charters, Army Catering Corps.
- No. 14358254 Sapper Phelim Joseph Dunne, Corps of Royal Engineers.
- No. 14593531 Warrant Officer Class II (acting) (now War Substantive Warrant Officer Class II) Peter Willoughby Eberall, Corps of Royal Engineers.
- No. W/140715 Corporal Amelia Kathleen Elliott, Auxiliary Territorial Service.
- No. 14361121 Sergeant Roy Fell, Royal Army Medical Corps.
- No. 4533848 Sergeant Francis Goldsmith, The York and Lancaster Regiment.
- No. 7597491 Staff-Sergeant William Albert Sydney Goodenough, Royal Electrical and Mechanical Engineers.
- No. S/14678083 Staff-Sergeant Augustus Dale Greenlee, Royal Army Service Corps.
- No. 14793183 Warrant Officer Class II (acting) Geoffrey Bertram Grey, Intelligence Corps.
- No. 3526701 Sergeant George Edward Grogan, Corps of Royal Military Police.
- No. 14667331 Staff-Sergeant (acting) William Arthur Heath, Corps of Royal Engineers.
- No. 843006 Staff-Sergeant George Hemsworth, Royal Regiment of Artillery.
- No. 7662163 Sergeant David Douglas Hill, Royal Regiment of Artillery.
- No. 3321739 Staff-Sergeant (acting) Vernon Henry Honey, Corps of Royal Engineers.
- No. W/105468 Sergeant Evelyn Clifford Hutchison, Auxiliary Territorial Service.
- No. 14262252 Sergeant Harry Hyde, Corps of Royal Engineers.
- No. 1877186 Sergeant George Henry Jasper, Corps of Royal Engineers.
- No. 1704606 Staff-Sergeant William Albert George Jeynes, Royal Electrical and (Mechanical Engineers.
- No. L/NCA/744 Sergeant Charles Jones, Jamaica Battalion.
- No. 14426095 Corporal John Aeron Jones, The iRoyal Welch Fusiliers.
- No. S/114803646 Staff-Sergeant Edwin Arthur Lambeth, Royal Army Service Corps.
- No. 2651226 Sergeant William Larbey, Coldstream Guards.
- No. 828519 Sergeant (acting) Jesse Laskey, Royal Regiment of Artillery.
- No. 6436377 Warrant Officer Class II (acting) Kenneth Lincoln, Intelligence Corps.
- No. 10575299 Staff-Sergeant Walter Marchant, Royal Army Ordnance Corps.
- No. 14740004 Warrant Officer Class II (acting) Edward Murdoch Martin, Royal Army Ordnance Corps.
- No. W/26410 Sergeant Dorothy Mary (Mathews, Auxiliary Territorial Service.
- No. W/98181 Sergeant Edna Marion Mortimer, Auxiliary Territorial Service.
- No. 14308807 Sapper Arnold Parsons, Corps of Royal Engineers.
- No. 2319055 Warrant Officer Class II (acting) Albert Price, Royal Corps of Signals.
- No. W/5162 Sergeant Winifred Joan Rackham, Auxiliary Territorial Service.
- No. L/SCA/1213 Lance-Sergeant Harold Rampersad, The Trinidad Regiment.
- No. 7264213 Sergeant George Ramsay, Royal Army Medical Corps.
- No. Dt/5 Warrant Officer Class II, Nusurupia Renatus, Combined School of Infantry, East Africa.
- No. 1535514 Sergeant Sam William Richardson, Royal Regiment of Artillery.
- No. S/5676040 Sergeant Douglas Charles Frank Smart, Royal Army Service Corps.
- No. SL/9 Warrant Officer Class II, Andrew Tambia, Royal West African Frontier Force.
- No. 1657573 Warrant Officer Class II (acting) Aubrey Whitfield Tring, Royal Regiment of Artillery.
- No. S/13117496 Staff-Sergeant Bruce John Ward, Royal Army Service Corps.
- No. 2030413 Company Quartermaster-Sergeant Albert Edward Webber, Corps of Royal Engineers.
- No. W/16650 Staff-Sergeant Audrey Noel Wilks, Auxiliary Territorial Service.
- No. 14340199 Warrant Officer Class II (acting) Sydney Wood, Royal Army Ordnance Carps.
- No. NA/25802 Warrant Officer Class I, Ramadu Yerwa, Royal West African Frontier Force.
- No. 7591019 Staff-Sergeant Anthony Zammit, Royal Electrical and Mechanical Engineers.

Royal Air Force

- 529957 Flight Sergeant Cyril John Baynham.
- 1100487 Flight Sergeant Edric Grenville Clapton, Royal Air Force Volunteer Reserve.
- 638227 Flight Sergeant Myles Alban Coles.
- 513104 Flight Sergeant Edmund John Edwards.
- 356777 Flight Sergeant Harold Knight.
- 370702 Flight Sergeant Samuel Arthur Scoggins.
- 638423 Flight Sergeant James Alec Sharples.
- 567274 Flight Sergeant William Thomas Watson.
- 75336 Acting Flight Sergeant Albert Thomas Boxall.
- 771529 Acting Flight Sergeant Maurice Francis Moore Flynn, Royal Air Force Volunteer Reserve.
- 515973 Acting Flight Sergeant Frederick Wilfred Smith.
- 574080 Sergeant Derrick George William Eeles.
- 637228 Sergeant Gordon Joseph Farrelly.
- 1052914 Sergeant Fred Mitchell, Royal Air Force Volunteer Reserve.
- 552317 Acting Sergeant, Archibald Gardyne Coomber.
- 1578879 Corporal Maurice Herbert Bendell, Royal Air Force Volunteer Reserve.
- 577684 Corporal Kenneth Jones.
- 576761 Corporal Kenneth Loughran.
- 1494543 Corporal Leonard Rimmington, Royal Air Force Volunteer Reserve.
- 1717024 Corporal Denis Alfred Shadwell, Royal Air Force Volunteer Reserve.
- 1698060 Corporal Frank Suddaby, Royal Air Force Volunteer Reserve.
- 544925 Leading Aircraftman John Seward.
- 892036 Flight Sergeant Margaret Bowen, Women's Auxiliary Air Force.
- 420348 Flight Sergeant Lauretta Kerr, Women's Auxiliary Air Force.
- 896581 Flight Sergeant Christina Jessie Rose, Women's Auxiliary Air Force.
- 436887 Acting Flight Sergeant Dillys Elaine Jenkins, Women's Auxiliary Air Force.
- 438498 Sergeant Gladys Jean Baker, Women's Auxiliary Air Force.
- 883973 Sergeant Constance Williams, Women's Auxiliary Air Force.
- 490714 Corporal Sheila Clenaghan, Women's Auxiliary Air Force.
- 2107984 Corporal Eileen Marie Louise Roberts, Women's Auxiliary Air Force.

Civil Division

- Matthew Abernethy, Foreman Tenter, Falls Flax Spinning Company Ltd., Belfast.
- Katherine Orme Alexander, Member, Women's Land Army, West Sussex.
- Robert Stephen Allan, Police Sergeant, Ayr County Police Force.
- Albert Oliver Allen, Deputy Chief Warehouse Supervisor, HM Stationery Office.
- Joseph Allison, Inspector, Head Post Office, Londonderry, Northern Ireland.
- James Adam Anning, MM, Plumber, Pearn Bros, Plymouth.
- Sidney Barnard, Foreman of Trades, No. 3 Maintenance Unit, RAF Milton, Berkshire.
- Gladys Marion Barnes, Assistant Group Officer, No. 39 (Swindon) Fire Force, National Fire Service.
- Joan Bartlett, Member, Women's Land Army, Coombe Keynes, Wareham.
- Francis John Bean, Laboratory Assistant, Ministry of Supply.
- James Bentley, Chief Petty Officer, Bridgend and Porthcawl Sea Cadet Corps.
- George Harry Beyer, Night Supervisor, Higher Grade, Gerrard Telephone Exchange, General Post Office.
- Arthur John Bishop, Acting First Class Draughtsman, Admiralty.
- Sidney Blake, Foreman, Regents Park, Ministry of Works.
- Arthur John Blowers, DCM, Divisional Chief Inspector, Air Ministry Constabulary.
- John Blundell, District Inspector, Trams and Trolleybuses, London Passenger Transport Board.
- John Bowen, Stoneman, Ashington Colliery, Northumberland.
- Abraham Bradburn, Roadway Maintenance Man, Moss Colliery, Lancashire.
- Samson Broad, Chief Passenger Yard Inspector, Great Western Railway Company.
- William Burton, Brigadesman, Sunderland Volunteer Life Brigade.
- Beatrice Annie Cain, Member, Women's Land Army, Mickleover Mental Hospital Estate, Derbyshire.
- Albert Victor Campbell, Postman, London Parcel Section.
- Michael James Carr, lately Collier, Astley Green Colliery, Lancashire.
- Thomas Walter Castledine, Receiving Foreman, Ministry of Supply Inspectorate of Electrical & Mechanical Equipment, Chislehurst.
- James Cessford, Foreman, Bruce Peebles & Company Ltd., Edinburgh.
- Joseph Burdis Chapman, Depot Storeholder, Ministry of Supply Depot, Leeds.
- James Andrew Chappell, Shop Foreman, Signals Development Unit, RAF West Drayton, Middlesex.
- William Drake Chapple, Sub-Postmaster, Allerford, Minehead, Somerset.
- Marjorie Ethel Cheston, Member, Women's Land Army, Bunny, Nottinghamshire.
- Walter Chevalier, Chargeman Labourer, King's Cross, London & North Eastern Railway Company.
- Hannah Coleby, Exchange Attendant, Post Office Telephone Exchange, Blundeston, Lowestoft.
- Alfred James Cordell, Chief Foreman (Sawmill), Southern Railway Company, Eastleigh.
- Percy Corden, Coal Getter, Newstead Colliery Nottingham.
- Lenora Cornish, Assistant Stock Controller, A. V. Roe & Company Ltd., Manchester.
- Percy Frederick Coward, Temporary Engineering Assistant, Ministry of Works.
- Harold Neville Cracknell, Maintenance Engineer, West Riding County General Hospital, Otley.
- Hugh Norman Cummings, Principal Technical Foreman, No. 35 Maintenance Unit, RAF Heywood.
- John Daley, Surface Worker, Dinnington Colliery, Northumberland.
- John Alfred Dash, Established Chargeman of Shipwrights, HM Dockyard, Devonport.
- Charles John Davis, Telegraph Inspector, Barking, London Midland and Scottish Railway Company.
- Ernest Reginald Dawkes, Acting Inspector of Engine Fitters, HM Dockyard, Rosyth.
- Charles Dawson, Shell Plater, Swan, Hunter & Wigham Richardson Ltd., Newcastle-on-Tyne.
- Hugh Dawson, Assistant Storekeeper and Ambulance Man, Clock Face Colliery, Lancashire.
- William Henry Deane, Chief Draughtsman, Cocksedge & Company Ltd., Ipswich.
- George William Dillaway, Chief Street Group Collector, Abertillery Savings Committee.
- Sydney James Docking, Manager, NAAFI Canteen, Chilwell.
- Robert Douglas, Leading Fireman, Western (No. 2) Area of Scotland, National Fire Service.
- Thomas Dowell, Coal and Stone Header, Cadley Hill Colliery, Midway.
- Matthew Duffy, Grade 4 Supervisor, Control Commission for Germany.
- Thomas Duncan, Bottomer, Polkemmet Colliery, Scotland.
- Thomas Henry Dwyer, Area Inspector, Traffic Department, Orpington, Southern Railway Company.
- Albert Eaton, Principal Artificer, Department of Scientific and Industrial Research.
- Ernest Ede, Slaughtering Contractor, Guildford.
- William Henry Fall, Skilled Workman, Class I, Post Office Telephones, Cambridge.
- Thomas Leslie Fenwick, Foreman, Nitric Acid Plant, Billingham.
- Joseph Finch, Surface Hand, Moorfield Colliery, Lancashire.
- Ernest Walter Flint, Barrack Warden, Carlisle Barracks, Cumberland.
- John Garland, Revolution Press Cutter, North British Rubber Company Ltd., Edinburgh.
- Harriet Geddes, Machine Tender, Henry Boase & Company Ltd., Dundee.
- George Howarth Gent, Mill Engineer, Yates Duxbury & Sons Ltd., Bury.
- Tessa Bernadine Graham, Member, Women's Land Army, Clarbeston, Pembrokeshire.
- William Graham, lately Underground Pump Attendant, Carnbroe Colliery, Lanarkshire.
- Arthur Henry Grainger, Mechanical and Electrical Chargehand, Air Ministry Works Directorate, Newmarket.
- Janet Paton Gray, Woman Police Sergeant, Glasgow City Police.
- Etta Green, Canteen Manageress, Ministry of Supply Factory, Springfields.
- Harry Greetham, Skilled Workman, Class I, Telephone Manager's Office, Peterborough.
- Winifred Greggains, Established Telephonist, Whitehall Telephone Exchange, General Post Office.
- Thomas Grimes, lately Trimmer, Transport Department, Sheffield.
- Henry Edward George Gummer, Senior Draughtsman, Admiralty.
- Percy Gwillim, JP, Underground Workman, Llanhilleth Colliery, South Wales.
- George William Haines, Porter, Bancroft's School, Woodford.
- Joseph Halsall, Plumber Jointer, Freshfield (Lanes), London Midland and Scottish Railway Company.
- William Hamil, Head Moulding Foreman, Cameron and Robertson Ltd., Kirkintilloch.
- Henry Frederick Harding, Acting Company Officer, No. 5 (London) Regional Headquarters, National Fire Service.
- James Harker, Foreman, Metal Box Company Ltd., Hull.
- Gilbert George Harris, Principal Foreman, Royal Aircraft Establishment, Farnborough.
- Manning Harris, Inspector-in-charge, Aeronautical Inspection Directorate, Ministry of Supply, Cheltenham.
- Clara Eleanor Hartley, Supervisor, Higher Grade, Post Office Telephone Exchange, Salford.
- Horace Havard, Foreman, National Gas Turbine Establishment, Ministry of Supply.
- Stanley Montague Clark Hayter, Charge Hand, Military Engineering Experimental Establishment, Ministry of Supply, Christchurch.
- David Grey Hildreth, Chief Examiner, Ministry of Supply, Barnoldswick.
- George Hitchborn, Acting Artificer, Admiralty Mining Establishment, Fareham.
- Richard Holford, Foreman, Air Service Training, Hamble, Hampshire.
- Leonard Sargent Holmes, Depot Manager, Coal House Distribution Scheme.
- Wilfred Douglas Hopkins, Officer Keeper, Grade II, Ministry of Pensions.
- William Hughes, Collier, Grove Colliery, Cannock Chase Area.
- Charlotte Mary Humphrey, Auxiliary Postwoman, Head Post Office, East Grinstead, Sussex.
- Benjamin Allen Hutchinson, Fire Prevention Officer, Bullcroft Main Colliery, Yorkshire.
- John William Ibbetson, Chief Smithy Foreman, Shildon Wagon Works, London and North Eastern Railway Company.
- Hilda Illingworth, Street Group Collector, Blackpool, National Savings Committee.
- Alfred Edwin Jago, Foreman, J. & E. Hall Ltd., Dartford, Kent.
- Edward John Jeffery, Works Foreman, Cozens & Sutcliffe Ltd., Muswell Hill, London.
- Vivien Eugenie Kipling, Member, Women's Land Army, Knebworth, Hertfordshire.
- Henry Kirkman, Furnace Brick-setter, United Glass Bottle Company Ltd., St. Helens.
- Thomas William Lancaster, Colliery Deputy, Brookhouse, Colliery, Yorkshire.
- John Lee, DCM, Technical Assistant, Tate Gallery, Millbank.
- Clement Lees, Grocer, Rochdale.
- William Lindop, Coalface Ripper, Parkhall Colliery, Staffordshire.
- David Thomas Llewellyn, Overman, Clydach Merthyr Colliery, Swansea.
- Marjorie Macaulay, Head of Information Department, Women's Voluntary Services.
- Jean Robertson Mackay, Member, Scottish Women's Land Army, Portmahomack, Rossshire.
- Mona McKellar, Member, Women's Land Army, Tadcaster, Yorkshire.
- Victor Henry McLeod, Station Master, Piccadilly Circus Station, London Passenger Transport Board.
- Charles Maguire, Depot Storeholder, Ministry of Supply Depot, Glasgow.
- Constance Love Mainwood, Postal & Telegraph Officer, Deal, Kent.
- Maurice Marks, Bookkeeper, Royal Ordnance Factory, Nottingham.
- William John Marsh, Assistant Overseer, Admiralty, Newcastle-on-Tyne.
- Charles Anderson Maxwell, Acting General Foreman of Works, Naval Works Office (Avadi Section), Madras, India.
- William Merritt, Day Wage Worker, Chislet Colliery, Kent.
- Samuel Edgar Miller, Head Officer Inspector, Willesden, London Midland and Scottish Railway Company.
- John Montgomery, Museum Glazier, British Museum.
- Edwin Charles Moody, DCM, Office Keeper, Grade I, Ministry of National Insurance.
- Henry Morgan, Underground Worker, Princess Royal Colliery, Gloucestershire.
- John Newman, Conductor, Central Buses, London Passenger Transport Board.
- Patience Mourilyan Badenach Nicolson, Assistant Nurse, Stracathro Hospital, Angus.
- Robert Noble, Works and Plant Engineer, North Eastern Marine Engineering Company (1938) Ltd., Wallsend-on-Tyne.
- James Nolan, Labour Foreman, Fleetwood Fishing Vessel Owners' Association Ltd.
- William James Norton, Maintenance Mechanic, Royal Ordnance Factory, Swynnerton.
- John Ogg, Sergeant Warder, Edinburgh Castle.
- Sarah O'Kelly, Head Laundress, Infectious Diseases Hospital, Blackburn.
- James Omer, Chief Foreman of Workshops, Admiralty Compass Observatory, Slough.
- Edward William James Osborne, Chief Inspector, Metropolitan Police Force.
- William Harman Pamplin, Chief Collector, Trumpington Village National Savings Group.
- Sidney William Parnell, Overseer of Clothing, Office of the Receiver for the Metropolitan Police.
- Wilfred David Peerless, Superintending Experimental Wireless Assistant, War Office.
- Maud Phillips, Controller, Nuffield House Junior Officers Residential Club.
- William Henry Pink, Mill Foreman, Cray Valley Paper Mills, Orpington, Kent.
- Thomas Plant, Travelling Night Supervisor, Telephone Manager's Office, Chester.
- Mary Esta Price, Member, Women's Land Army, Thornton Hough, Cheshire.
- William Thomas Prynn, Travelling Superintending Gardener, Imperial War Graves Commission, France.
- Edward Pumfrey, Foreman, Ministry of Supply Storage Depot, Strensham.
- Arthur Purdue, Onsetter, Newstead Colliery, Nottingham.
- Cecil Raynes, Chef, Public Assistance Institution, Leicester.
- Frank Richards, lately Locomotive Inspector, Redhill, Southern Railway Company.
- Alfred Robbins, Underground Pumpman, Brancepeth Colliery, Northumberland.
- Edward Turner Roberts, Inspector, North Junction Signal Box, Crewe, London Midland and Scottish Railway Company.
- May Roberts. For services to the Forces in Londonderry.
- Albert Edwin Robinson, Assistant Line Engineer, British Overseas Airways Corporation.
- Manuel Rodriguez, Civilian Foreman, Ordnance Services, War Office, Gibraltar.
- Henry Rogers, Senior Bailiff, Manchester County Court.
- Margaret Saunders, Member, Women's Land Army, Isleworth, Middlesex.
- Leslie Charles Scott, Warrant Officer, No. 20F (Cardiff) Squadron, Air Training Corps.
- Edgar Scovell, Recorder of Work, HM Dockyard, Portsmouth.
- Stanley Reginald Sheldon, Senior Draughtsman, Newton Bros, (Derby) Ltd., Derby.
- Archibald Simpson, Trial Trip Engineer and Outside Erector, G. & J. Weir Ltd., Glasgow.
- George Cameron Simpson, Warrant Officer, No. 404 (Morpeth) Squadron, Air Training Corps.
- George Edgar Smith, Foreman, Liverpool (Stanley) Slaughterhouse.
- John Robert Smith, Collier, Briggs Collieries, Yorkshire.
- Isaiah William Purchase Sparrock, Station Officer, HM Coastguard, St. Agnes, Cornwall.
- Frederick Rambart Spicer, Charge Hand Mechanic, Ministry of Supply Experimental Establishment, Shoeburyness.
- George Ernest Squibb, Storeholder Grade "A", Central Ammunition Depot, War Office, Bramley.
- Stanley Howard Squires, Inspecting Officer, Royal Naval College, Dartmouth.
- William Henry Starr, Chief Draughtsman, Brintons Ltd., Kidderminster.
- William Duncan Stewart, Assistant Superintendent, Reproduction Ordnance Survey, Ministry of Agriculture and Fisheries.
- John Stronach, Mail Contract Driver, Alyth, Perthshire.
- Thomas Stubbs, Miner, Mitchells Main Colliery, Yorkshire.
- William Cyril Taylor, Technician, Post Office Telephone Exchange, Bradford.
- Helen Thom, Machinist, Inverurie Works London & North Eastern Railway Company.
- Henry Charles Thomas, Foreman, Royal Edward Docks, Avonmouth Docks.
- Thomas Thompson, Overman, Sandwell Park Colliery, Staffordshire.
- Charles Robert Turner, Works Inspector, Stratford, London & North Eastern Railway Company.
- Frances Tuxworth, Assistant Supervisor, Class II, Post Office Telephone Exchange, Willesden.
- William Dennis Tyrell, Driver, Eastern Counties Omnibus Company Ltd., Norwich.
- George Henry Yenning, Chief Officer, Class I, HM Prison, Birmingham.
- Mabel Maud Wallace, Stranding Machine Operator, Standard Telephones & Cables Ltd., North Woolwich.
- James Matthew Wallington, lately Goods Agent, Chatham, Strood and GiUingham Goods Depot, Southern Railway Company.
- Florence Welch, Supervisor (Telegraphs), Head Post Office, Hastings.
- Percival Arthur West, Superintendent of Department, Cellomold Ltd., Feltham, Middlesex.
- Edwin James Wharton, Inspector of Postmen, Head Post Office, Crewe, Cheshire.
- Albert Wilkinson, Coal Cutter and Conveyor Supervisor, Snibston Colliery, Coalville, Leicestershire.
- Albert Edward Williams, Collector, Street Savings Group, National Savings Committee, Brighton.
- Henry George Williams, Charge Hand Patternmaker, Ministry of Supply.
- James Edward Williams, Storeman, Territorial Army Association of the County of Oxford.
- Robert Henry Williams, Volunteer-in-Charge, Coast Life Saving Corps, Barmouth.
- Horace Watson Wise, Station Master, Heighington, London & North Eastern Railway Company.
- Robert Scott Burns Wood, Dry Dock Attendant, Imperial Dry Dock, Leith.
- Fanny Wooler, Organiser, Services Canteen, Women's Voluntary Services, Ellenborough Park, Weston-Super-Mare.
- Violet Wooler, Organiser, Services Canteen, Women's Voluntary Services, Ellenborough Park, Weston-Super-Mare.
- Charles John Wright, Sorter, London Postal Region.
- Mary Jane Wright, Sub-Postmistress, Oakridge Lynch, Stroud.
- May Yeomans, Forewoman, Royal Aircraft Establishment, Farnborough.
- Augusta Hart Young, Assistant Supervisor, Class I (Travelling), Post Office, Telephone Exchange, Swansea.
- Catherine Young, Collector, Middleham National Savings Group, Yorkshire.

Foreign Services

- Ernest John Mark Gay, Head Messenger, British Consulate General, New York.
- William Meadows, Driller, Anglo-Iranian Oil Company Ltd.
- John Fulton Robinson, Rigger, Anglo-Iranian Oil Company Ltd.

India

- Lewis William Atkinson, Officiating Assistant Mechanical Engineer, Madras and Southern Mahratta Railway, Perambur.
- Charles Banyard, Foreman, Carriage and Wagon Shops, North-Western Railway, Moghalpura.
- Noel Henry Arthur Beach, Principal Foreman, High Explosives Factory, Kirkee.
- Ena Boyes-Cooper, lately Grade "A" Clerk, General Staff Branch, General Headquarters, India.
- Phyllis Leonora Crummy, Lady Clerk, Headquarters, Northern Command, India.
- Vera Dorothy Moncrieff, Personal Assistant to the General Officer Commanding, Peshawar Area.

Colonial Empire

- Leonard Adolphus Jervis, Senior Agricultural Instructor, Agriculture and Marine Products Board, Bahamas.
- William Henry Smith, Warrant Officer, Police Force, British Guiana.
- George Armah, Postmaster, Bolgatanga, Northern Territories, Gold Coast.
- Miguel Caetano Nazareth, Asian Clerk, Isiolo, Kenya.
- Karioki wa Nai, Chief Warder Grade I, Prisons Department, Kenya.
- Cecil Ernest Utting, Overseer, Class I, Port Department, Kenya and Uganda Railways and Harbours.
- Debandra Nath Samanta, Chief Bridge Inspector, Railway Service, Malayan Union.
- Adolphus Lionel Goring, Chief Traffic Inspector, Nigerian Railway.
- Matthew Adeniran Griffin, Carriage and Wagon Inspector, Nigerian Railway.
- Aryeh Shamir, Chief Laboratory Assistant, Palestine.
- Marianthy Megasthenos, Secretary-Stenographer, Government Press, Palestine.
- Harry Dunstan Klass, lately Office Assistant, Colonial Secretary's Office, Singapore.
- James Addison Ntukula, African Sanitary Inspector, Grade II, Medical Department, Tanganyika.
- Abbas Jumbe, Supervisor of Schools, Education Department, Tanganyika.

=== Royal Red Cross (RRC) ===
- Principal Matron (acting) Dorothy Davis (NZ 6514), Indian Military Nursing Service.
- Matron Zillah Scott (206438), Queen Alexandra's Imperial Military Nursing Service.
- Acting Senior Sister Ethel Winifred Griffiths, ARRC, (5037), Princess Mary's Royal Air Force Nursing Service

==== Associate of the Royal Red Cross (ARRC) ====
- Barbara Francis Bailey, Nursing Sister, Queen Alexandra's Royal Naval Nursing Service.
- Joan England Simpson, Nursing Sister, Queen Alexandra's Royal Naval Nursing Service.
- Senior Sister Blanche Elizabeth Burke (NZ 29337), Indian Military Nursing Service (Temporary).
- Sister Dorothy Olive Wakeham (206517), Queen Alexandra's Imperial Military Nursing Service.
- Senior Sister Florence St. Clair Watkins (NZ 21389), Indian Military Nursing Service (Temporary).
- Acting Senior Sister Muriel Ethel Hale (5176), Princess Mary's Royal Air Force Nursing Service

=== Air Force Cross (AFC) ===
Royal Air Force

- Group Captain John Herbert Thomas Simpson, DSO.
- Acting Wing Commander Elmer Coton, DFC, (70851).
- Acting Wing Commander James Graham Mann (40477), Reserve of Air Force Officers.
- Acting Wing Commander Robert Maycock, MRCS, LRCP, (23422).
- Acting Squadron Leader Staveley Ernest Bulford (60541).
- Acting Squadron Leader William Ernest Farrow (119548).
- Acting Squadron Leader John Trevor Freeman, DFC, (43418).
- Acting Squadron Leader Harry Spencer Grimsey, DFC, (121202), Royal Air Force Volunteer Reserve.
- Acting Squadron Leader Leonard Preddy (55084).
- Acting Squadron Leader Joseph Singleton, DSO, DFC, (69431), Royal Air Force Volunteer Reserve.
- Flight Lieutenant Archibald Reginald Ainsworth (145044), Royal Air Force Volunteer Reserve.
- Flight Lieutenant John Stuart Aldridge (84669), Royal Air Force Volunteer Reserve.
- Flight Lieutenant Raymond Alfred Baker, AFM, (143896), Royal Air Force Volunteer Reserve.
- Flight Lieutenant Ernest William Bartlett (139599), Royal Air Force Volunteer Reserve.
- Flight Lieutenant Stanley Beckett (131944), Royal Air Force Volunteer Reserve.
- Flight Lieutenant Nelson Briggs (126070).
- Flight Lieutenant Apostolos Contaris (168692), Royal Air Force Volunteer Reserve.
- Flight Lieutenant Douglas Jellicoe Mason Coxhead (156632), Royal Air Force Volunteer Reserve.
- Flight Lieutenant William George Drinkell, DFC, (55113).
- Flight Lieutenant William Kenneth Greer (133689), Royal Air Force Volunteer Reserve.
- Flight Lieutenant Peter Harrison (115247), Royal Air Force Volunteer Reserve.
- Flight Lieutenant John Maldwyn John (158549), Royal Air Force Volunteer Reserve.
- Flight Lieutenant Philip Clive Kilmister, DFC, (142358), Royal Air Force Volunteer Reserve.
- Flight Lieutenant Stanley McCreith (124790), Royal Air Force Volunteer Reserve.
- Flight Lieutenant William Trevor Morrison (52111).
- Flight Lieutenant John Murphy (144225), Royal Air Force Volunteer Reserve.
- Flight Lieutenant Desmond Burman Nixon (141725).
- Flight Lieutenant Kenneth William Pendrey (49145).
- Flight Lieutenant Francis Herbert Smith (108134), Royal Air Force Volunteer Reserve.
- Flying Officer Harold Thomas Goldham (167782), Royal Air Force Volunteer Reserve.
- Flying Officer James Munro (186738), Royal Air Force Volunteer Reserve.

Royal Navy

- Lieutenant-Commander Eric Brown, OBE, DSC.

Royal Australian Air Force

- Squadron Leader John Raymond French (Aus.251511).
- Squadron Leader Colin Charles Henry (Aus.280802).
- Squadron Leader John Geoffrey Hoskins, DFC, (Aus.261718).
- Squadron Leader Justyn Ronald Lavers, AFM, (Aus.2758).
- Squadron Leader John Thomas O'Brien (Aus.467).
- Flight Lieutenant Reginald William Adsett (Aus.402194).
- Flight Lieutenant Edgar Murray Allison (Aus.411847).
- Flight Lieutenant Malcolm Wilbur Baker (Aus. 406127).
- Flight Lieutenant Maxwell Clive Clifford (Aus.413244).
- Flight Lieutenant Charles Royston Gallwey (Aus.404093).
- Flight Lieutenant Eric Thomas Wallis Holt (Aus.413384).
- Flight Lieutenant Patrick Joseph Love (Aus. 22788).
- Flight Lieutenant Arthur William Primrose Malcolm (Aus.407206).
- Flight Lieutenant Cecil Raymond McNichol (Aus.414503).
- Flight Lieutenant John Rankin (Aus.1390).
- Flight Lieutenant Edward Beauchamp Stacy (Aus.403962).
- Flying Officer Arthur Burns (Aus.437727).
- Flying Officer Henry Angell Kirkhouse, DFM, (Aus.21147).
- Flying Officer Norman John Properjohn (Aus.16549).

==== Bar to Air Force Cross ====
- Group Captain Edward Mortlock Donaldson, DSO, AFC, Royal Air Force.
- Acting Squadron Leader William Arthur Waterton, AFC, (42288), Reserve of Air Force Officers.
- Lieutenant-Colonel Pierre Marais Retief, AFC, (102989V), South African Air Force.

=== Air Force Medal (AFM) ===
- 566371 Flight Sergeant Albert Edward Clarence Brookin, Royal Air Force.
- 2236287 Flight Sergeant John Francis Entwtstle, Royal Air Force Volunteer Reserve.
- Flight Sergeant Derrick William Hosking (Aus.5308), Royal Australian Air Force.

=== King's Commendation for Valuable Service in the Air ===
Royal Air Force

- Acting Wing Commander R. C. E. Scott, AFC, (36250).
- Squadron Leader W. B. Price-Owen (39829), Reserve of Air Force Officers.
- Acting Squadron Leader H. G. Hazelden, DFC, (60323), Royal Air Force Volunteer Reserve.
- Acting Squadron Leader F. Landrey, AFC, AFM, (43176).
- Flight Lieutenant M. H. Cadman (150882), Royal Air Force Volunteer Reserve.
- Flight Lieutenant G. S. Forrest (130948), Royal Air Force Volunteer Reserve.
- Flight Lieutenant A. E. Garrod (44264).
- Flight Lieutenant D. W. Harvey (150431), Royal Air Force Volunteer Reserve.
- Flight Lieutenant E. M. Haslam (127042), Royal Air Force Volunteer Reserve.
- Flight Lieutenant W. K. J. Haynes (175000).
- Flight Lieutenant M. V. Hodge (129471), Royal Air Force Volunteer Reserve.
- Flight Lieutenant M. Hoyle (47407).
- Flight Lieutenant H. J. King (49237) Royal Air Force.
- Flight Lieutenant E. McNamara, DFC, (177437), Royal Air Force Volunteer Reserve.
- Flight Lieutenant D. E. Osland (115427), Royal Air Force Volunteer Reserve.
- Flight Lieutenant G. R. I. Parker, DFC, DSM, (47140).
- Flight Lieutenant G. C. Toye (87016), Royal Air Force Volunteer Reserve.
- Flight Lieutenant D. G. Walker (181075), Royal Air Force Volunteer Reserve.
- Flying Officer R. A. E. Allen (187693), Royal Air Force Volunteer Reserve.
- Flying Officer K. A. W. Butcher (189479), Royal Air Force Volunteer Reserve.
- Flying Officer C. B. Lindop (57482).
- 3060375 Flight Sergeant W. W. Truckle, Royal Air Force Volunteer Reserve.
- 1312531 Pilot II H. Davies, Royal Air Force Volunteer Reserve.
- 1441086 Pilot II N. C. Hayes, Royal Air Force Volunteer Reserve.
- 657873 Pilot II D. J. Parsons.
- 1803877 Navigator II R. D. Bone, Royal Air Force Volunteer Reserve.

Royal Navy

- Commander J. A. Ievers, OBE.

Royal Australian Air Force

- Flight Lieutenant Robert Henry Campbell (Aus.275144).
- Flight Lieutenant Michael John Hynes (Aus.428316).
- Flight Lieutenant Herbert Raymond Lee (Aus.417088).
- Flight Lieutenant Leonard Charles Lobb (Aus.418965).
- Flight Lieutenant Harold Ballam O'Connor (Aus.2242).
- Flight Lieutenant Bernard Parker (Aus.411942).
- Flight Lieutenant Colin Carl Keith Rowe (Aus.12420).
- Flight Lieutenant William Ottaway Thomas (Aus.407935).
- Warrant Officer Cyril Robert Loney (Aus.435574).

=== King's Commendation for Brave Conduct ===
- 1632388 Corporal K. J. Harn, Royal Air Force Volunteer Reserve.

=== King's Police and Fire Services Medal (KPFSM) ===
==== Police ====
England and Wales

- Joseph Jones, CBE, Chief Constable, Glamorganshire Constabulary.
- William James Howard, OBE, Chief Constable, Bolton Borough Police Force.
- Charles George Maby, CBE, Chief Constable, Bristol City Police Force.
- Captain Stephen Hugh Van Neck, MVO, MC, Chief Constable, Norfolk Constabulary.
- William Newrick Wilson, Assistant Chief Constable, Portsmouth City Police Force.
- Thomas Murray Chartres, Superintendent, Northumberland Constabulary.
- Sidney Walter Hammond, Superintendent and Deputy Chief Constable, West Suffolk Constabulary.
- Samuel George Weir, Superintendent, Newcastle-upon-Tyne City Police Force.
- Arthur Brice, Sub-Divisional Inspector, Metropolitan Police Force.
- William Wright Brownfield, Sub-Divisional Inspector, Metropolitan Police Force.
- William Henry Simmons, MBE, Chief Officer, Port of London Authority Police.

Scotland

- Victor George Savi, Chief Constable, Fifeshire Constabulary.
- Robert Mitchell, OBE, Chief Constable, Kincardineshire Constabulary.

Northern Ireland

- Albert Henry Kennedy, District Inspector, Royal Ulster Constabulary.

Australia

- James Richard Birch, Detective Sub-Inspector, Victoria Police.

New Zealand

- James Cummings, Commissioner of Police, Wellington.

India

- Frederick Lewis Underwood, OBE, Deputy Inspector-General of Police, Madras.
- Arthur Ernest Spitteler, District Superintendent of Police (Officiating), Madras.
- Harold Brown, Deputy Superintendent of Police (Officiating), Madras.
- Cecil William Edward Uren, District Superintendent of Police, Bombay.
- Clement Mervin Scott Yates, Superintendent of Police, Bombay.
- Babu Pramatha Nath Banarji, Deputy Superintendent of Police (Officiating), Howrah, Bengal.
- Syed Yad Ali, Circle Inspector of Police, District Unao, United Provinces.
- Sardar Sant Parkash Singh, Deputy Inspector General of Police, Punjab.
- Edward Charles Borton, Deputy Superintendent of Police, Assistant Commandant, Dehri Military Police, Bihar.
- Sarada Prashad Varma, Superintendent of Police, Bihar.
- Rai Sahib Sripati Nanda, Deputy Superintendent of Police, Orissa.
- Arthur Walter Pryde, OBE, Deputy Inspector-General of Police, Special Duty, Karachi, Sind.
- William Douglas Robinson, OBE, Senior Superintendent of Police, Delhi.
- Srinivasa Parthasarathi Ayyangar, Inspector-General of Police, Travancore State.
- Sardar Ajaib Singh, Inspector of Police, Faridkot State.

Burma

- Cecil Bruce Orr, Officiating Deputy Inspector-General of Police, Burma.

Colonies, Protectorates and Mandated Territories

- Allan Malcolm Bell, CPM, Deputy Commissioner of Police, Mauritius.
- Malcolm Lionel Fraser, CPM, Commissioner of Police, Nyasaland.
- Alfred Edward Burt, Superintendent of Police, Seychelles.
- Major Thomas Norman Drake, Superintendent of Police, Trinidad.
- William Frederick Stafford, Assistant Superintendent of Police, Malayan Union.
- Loh Sin, Detective Sub-Inspector, Malayan Union Police.
- Rolf Sadler Hainsworth, Assistant Superintendent of Police, Palestine.
- George Leslie Matthews, CPM, Assistant Superintendent of Police, Palestine.

==== Fire Services ====
England and Wales

- Clifford Victor Hall. Fire Force Commander, No. 1 (Newcastle) Fire Force.
- William Gayton. Assistant Fire Force Commander, No. 20 (Cardiff) Fire Force.
- Ernest Thomas, Assistant Fire Force Commander, No. 31 (Brighton) Fire Force.
- Edward George Haylett, Divisional Officer, No. 9 (Leicester) Fire Force.
- John Cronshaw Crabtree, Column Officer, No. 29 (Preston) Fire Force.

Scotland

- Thomas Johnson, Senior Company Officer, Eastern Area.

=== Colonial Police Medal (CPM) ===
Southern Rhodesia

- Herbert Colin De La Taste, Chief Inspector, British South Africa Police.
- Sydney George Kilborn, Chief Inspector, British South Africa Police.
- Ernest James Lennox, Inspector, British South Africa Police.
- Shabo. Native First Detective Sergeant, British South Africa Police.

Bechuanaland Protectorate

- Joseph Dinku, Senior Lance Sergeant, Bechuanaland Protectorate Police.
- Captain Morley Robert Dalrymple Langley, MVO, Superintendent, Bechuanaland Protectorate Police.

Colonies, Protectorates, Mandated Territories

- Naif Daoud Abboud, Palestinian Sub-Inspector, Palestine Police Force.
- Abdullah Bin Abdul Rahman, Sergeant-Major, Malayan Union Police Force.
- John Aboderin, Sergeant-Major, Nigeria Police Force.
- James Adam, British Inspector, Palestine Police Force.
- Ang Ah Khai, Sub-Inspector, Singapore Police Force.
- Ali Ibrahim Azaizeh, Second Inspector, Palestine Police Force.
- Louis Alfred Bancilhon, Sergeant, Mauritius Police Force.
- Captain Guy Ronald Bass, lately Senior Superintendent, Hong Kong Police Force.
- Hassan Mahmoud Batrouch, Palestinian Constable, Palestine Police Force.
- Ibraham Bitar, Assistant Superintendent, Palestine Police Force.
- Francis Edwin Blackburn, Acting Assistant Superintendent, Mauritius Police Force.
- Salifu Dagarti, Sergeant-Major, Gold Coast Police Force.
- Harold Arthur Diffey, 1st British Sergeant, Palestine Police Force.
- William Tillawah Doherty, Assistant Superintendent, Sierra Leone Police Force.
- James Charleston Douglas, 1st British Sergeant, Palestine Police Force.
- Walter Duncan, Senior Superintendent, Aden Police Force.
- Jean Tristan Etienne, Staff Sergeant-Major, Mauritius Police Force.
- Eu Hai Lee, Sub-Inspector, Singapore Police Force.
- Sandys Parker George, Superintendent, Nigeria Police Force.
- Giam Chong King, Inspector, Singapore Police Force.
- Thomas Gombera, Head Detective, Nyasaland Police Force.
- John Martin Goodlet, 1st British Sergeant, Palestine Police Force.
- Austin Byers Harper, First Class Inspector, Jamaica Constabulary.
- Robert Gordon Henderson, Superintendent, Nigeria Police Force.
- Lewis Hobbs, 2nd British Sergeant, Palestine Police Force.
- Basil Frederick Hooper, Superintendent, Fiji Constabulary.
- Saadi Jallad, Palestinian Sub-Inspector, Palestine Police Force.
- ElDagalla Aboker Musa Jama Abdi, Sub-Inspector, Somaliland Police Force.
- William John James, Major, Somaliland Police Force.
- Keith Littlewood Johnson, Assistant Superintendent, Singapore Police Force.
- Momammed Ali El Khalil, Palestinian Corporal, Palestine Police Force.
- Charles Tristan Lagaite, Paymaster, Mauritius Police Force.
- Charles Stuart Langley, 1st British Sergeant, Palestine Police Force.
- Yisa Lawani, Sub-Inspector, Nigeria Police Force.
- George Robert Livett, Superintendent, Malayan Union Police Force.
- James Alexander Macdonald, Superintendent, Nigeria Police Force.
- George Kell Matthews, 1st British Sergeant, Palestine Police Force.
- Edward Alfred Hamilton Melville, Sub-Inspector, Trinidad Police Force.
- Mohammed Khalil Mohammed, Foot Sergeant, Palestine Police Force.
- Mohamed Mustaffa, 1st Grade Sergeant, Kenya Police Force.
- Adana Onana, Sergeant, Nigeria Police Force.
- Major Edward Oliver Plunkett, Senior Superintendent, Windward Islands Police Force.
- William Edgar Ryan, Lance Corporal, Leeward Islands Police Force.
- Abdulla Said, Chief Inspector (Asian), Kenya Police Force.
- Salleh Bin Ismail, Inspector, Malayan Union Police Force.
- Isaac Schweilly, Mounted Sergeant, Palestine Police Force.
- Stanley Charles Sinclair, Superintendent, Gold Coast Police Force.
- Laban Estler Stanley, Sergeant-Major, Jamaica Constabulary.
- Frederick Stevenson, Acting Assistant Superintendent, Palestine Police Force.
- Edward William Strutt-Cavell, British Constable, Palestine Police Force.
- Govindasamy Thancanamootoo, Corporal, Mauritius Police Force.
- Thomas Tranter, British Constable, Palestine Police Force.
- Louis Henry Turenne, Constable, Mauritius Police Force.
- Arthur Henry Waghorn, 2nd British Sergeant, Palestine Police Force.
- Uriel Augustus Watson, Detective Sergeant, Jamaica Constabulary.
- Reginald Ivor Woodhouse, 2nd British Sergeant, Palestine Police Force.

=== Mention in Despatches ===
Royal Navy

- Acting Commander Claude Edward Lutley Sclater, DSO.
- Lieutenant-Commander David Allan Robert Malcolm Ramsay, DSC.
- Acting Lieutenant-Commander John Dalton Jones.
- Temporary Acting Lieutenant-Commander Walter Lionel Pollard, Royal Naval Volunteer Reserve.
- Acting Chief Petty Officer Torpedo Coxswain William George Mark Dukes, P/JX. 144059.
- Chief Engineman Leonard Charles Ball, LT/KX.109786.
- Petty Officer David O'Shea, D/JX.142697.
- Acting Petty Officer Terence Michael Riley, C/JX.148059.
- Petty Officer Stoker Mechanic (Temporary) Leonard Arthur Joseph Smith, P/KX. 93341.
- Engineman Alfred Thomas George Wheeler, L/KX.106915.
- Able Seaman Lionel Maguire, C/JX.152941.
- Cook (S) John Elliott Leyton, P/MX.761907.
