= List of Old Bedfordians =

Alumni of a public school in Bedfordshire

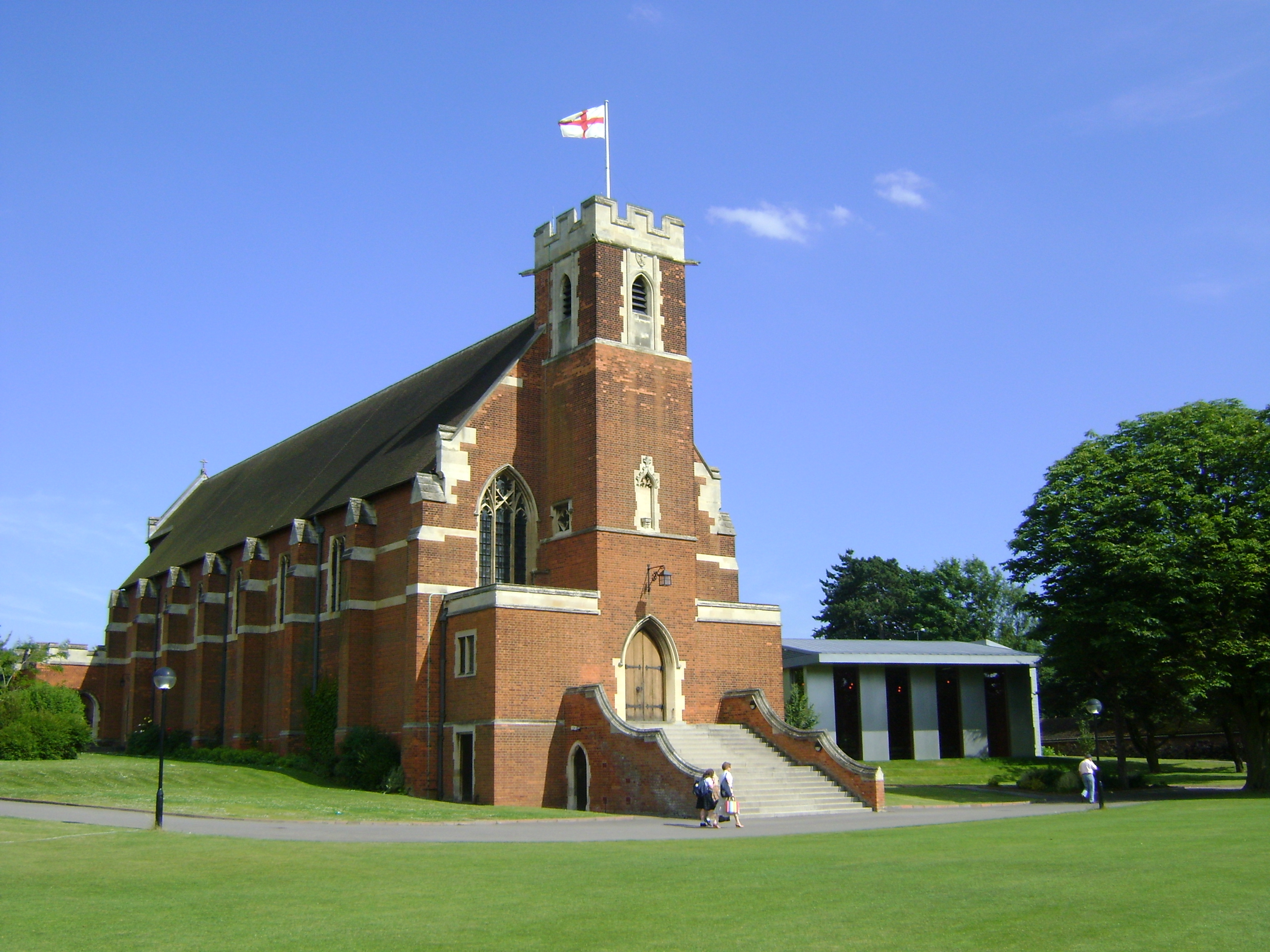
Bedford School Chapel (with the new Music School seen to the right)

This is a list of people educated at Bedford School.

== Academia ==
- Rev. James Dennis (1815–1861), paleontologist and natural historian
- Sir Warington Wilkinson Smyth (1817–1890), geologist
- Francis Penrose (1817–1903), Fellow of Magdalene College, Cambridge, architect, archaeologist and astronomer
- Professor Charles Piazzi Smyth (1819–1900), Professor of Astronomy, University of Edinburgh, and Astronomer Royal for Scotland, 1846–1888
- John Thompson Platts (1830–1904), Indian and Persian language scholar
- Richard Daintree (1832–1878), geologist who gave his name to the Daintree National Park, the Daintree Rainforest and the Daintree River, Australia
- Thomas Gwyn Elger (1836–1897), selenographer who gave his name to the lunar crater Elger
- Arthur Coke Burnell (1840–1882), Sanskrit scholar
- Charles Heycock (1858–1931), Fellow of King's College, Cambridge, chemist, winner of the Royal Society's Davy Medal, 1920
- Walter Gardiner (1859–1941), Fellow of Clare College, Cambridge, botanist, winner of the Royal Society's Royal Medal, 1898
- Sir Wyndham Dunstan (1861–1949), chemist and Director of the Imperial Institute, 1903–1924
- Sir Walter Langdon-Brown (1870–1946), Regius Professor of Physic, University of Cambridge, 1932–1935
- Thomas Cecil Fitzpatrick (1881–1931), President of Queens' College, Cambridge, 1906–1931, and Vice-Chancellor of the University of Cambridge, 1915–1917 and 1928–1929
- Charles Kingsley Meek (1885–1965), Fellow of Brasenose College, Oxford, anthropologist
- Rev. Thomas Wentworth Pym (1885–1945), Fellow in Theology, Balliol College, Oxford
- Laurence Beddome Turner (1886–1963), Fellow of King's College, Cambridge, and Reader in Engineering, University of Cambridge
- William Rowan (1891–1957), Canadian biologist
- Sir Karl Parker (1895–1992), art historian and Keeper of the Ashmolean Museum, 1945–1962
- John Desmond Bernal (1901–1971), pioneer of X-ray crystallography in molecular biology
- Herbert Squire (1909–1961), Zaharoff Professor of Aviation, Imperial College London, 1952–1961
- Archer John Porter Martin (1910–2002), winner of the Nobel Prize in Chemistry, 1952
- Richard D'Aeth (1912–2008), educationalist and President of Hughes Hall, Cambridge, 1978–1984
- John Selwyn Bromley (1913–1985), Fellow in Modern History, Keble College, Oxford, 1947–1960, and Professor of Modern History, University of Southampton, 1960–1977
- Harry Cranbrook Allen (1917–1998), Fellow and Tutor in Modern History, Lincoln College, Oxford, 1946–1955, and Commonwealth Fund Professor of American History, University College London, 1955–1971
- Professor Peter Corbett (1920–1992), Yates Professor of Classical Art and Archaeology, University College London, 1961–1982
- Paul Talalay (1923-2019), John Jacob Abel Professor of Pharmacology and Director of the Laboratory for Molecular Sciences, Johns Hopkins School of Medicine, 1974–
- Roger Sargent (1926-2018), Courtaulds Professor of Chemical engineering, Imperial College London, 1966–1992
- Frank Adams (1930–1989), Fielden Professor of Mathematics, University of Manchester, 1964–1970, and Lowndean Professor of Astronomy and Geometry, University of Cambridge, 1970–1989
- Robert Cassen (born 1935), Professor of the Economics of Development, University of Oxford, 1986–1997
- Quentin Skinner (born 1940), Fellow in History, Christ's College, Cambridge, 1962–1996, and Regius Professor of Modern History, University of Cambridge, 1996–2008
- Richard Edwin Hills (1945–2022), Professor of Radio Astronomy, University of Cambridge, 1990–2007
- Andrew Jackson O'Shaughnessy (born 1959), Saunders Director, International Centre for Jefferson Studies, Monticello, and Professor of History, University of Virginia
- C. E. M. Hansel (1917–2011), Emeritus Professor of Experimental Psychology, Swansea University.

== Actors, directors and entertainers ==
- Cyril Harcourt (1872–1924), actor and playwright
- H B Warner (1875–1958), actor nominated for the Academy Award for Best Supporting Actor, 1937
- H F Maltby (1880–1963), actor, playwright and screenwriter
- Roy Limbert (1893–1954), theatre director and producer
- Torin Thatcher (1905–1981), actor
- Bob Kellett (1927–2012), film director, producer and screenwriter
- John Wood (1930–2011), actor noted for his performances in Shakespeare and for his long association with Tom Stoppard
- Andrew McCulloch (born 1945), actor and writer
- Michael Radford (born 1946), film director and screenwriter, noted for films including Nineteen Eighty-Four, White Mischief and Il Postino
- Simon Chandler (born 1953), actor
- Richard Hopkins (1964–2012), television producer
- Bob Barrett (born 1966), actor
- Al Murray (born 1968), comedian
- Joel Beckett (born 1973), actor
- David Lloyd Vitty (born 1974), BBC Radio 1 presenter
- Jonno Davies (born 1992), actor

== Adventurers and nonconformists ==
- Rev. Stainton Moses (1839–1892), spiritualist
- Colonel Frederick Burnaby (1842–1885), adventurer, army officer, author, balloonist, and correspondent for The Times
- Samuel Liddell MacGregor Mathers (1854–1918), occultist
- Ardern Hulme Beaman (1857–1929), adventurer, author, diplomat, and war correspondent
- Lieutenant Colonel Stewart Blacker (1887–1964), adventurer, army officer, author of First over Everest, and weapons designer
- John de Vars Hazard (1888–1968), mountaineer who took part in the 1924 British Mount Everest expedition, famous for the disappearance of Mallory and Irvine
- Reginald Teague-Jones (1890–1988), intelligence officer active in the Caucasus and Central Asia during the Russian Civil War
- Norman Baillie-Stewart (1909–1966), traitor known as 'The Officer in the Tower'
- Simon Murray CBE (born 1940), adventurer, author, French Foreign Legionnaire, and the oldest man to reach the South Pole unsupported
- Rupert T Dover (born 1967), Assistant Commissioner of the Hong Kong Police Force

== Architecture ==
- John Pollard Seddon (1827–1906), architect
- Harry Bulkeley Creswell (1869–1960), architect and author
- Oswald Milne (1881–1968), architect
- Peter "Joe" Chamberlin (1919–1978), architect and town planner responsible for the Barbican Centre and the Barbican Estate in London
- Sir Bernard Feilden (1919–2008), conservation architect whose work encompassed cathedrals, the Great Wall of China and the Taj Mahal

== Artists ==
- James Ravilious (1939–1999), photographer, specialised in recording the rural life of north Devon

== Armed forces ==
=== Victoria Cross and George Cross ===
- First World War
  - Lieutenant Colonel George Campbell Wheeler (1880–1938) awarded Victoria Cross
  - Sub-Lieutenant Arthur Walderne St. Clair Tisdall (1890–1915) awarded Victoria Cross
  - Major Montague Shadworth Moore (1896–1966) awarded Victoria Cross
- Second World War
  - Commander Richard Jolly (1896–1939)
  - Major General Henry Bowreman Foote (1904–1993), awarded Victoria Cross, General Officer Commanding, 11th Armoured Division, 1950–1953

=== Navy ===
- Rear Admiral Alfred Ransom (1871–1953), served during the Gambia Expedition, 1894, the Boxer Rebellion, 1900–1901, and the First World War
- Vice Admiral Fawcet Wray (1873–1932), commanded HMS Talbot at Gallipoli, 1915
- Vice Admiral Arthur Kemmis Betty (1877–1961), Aide-de-camp to King George V, Commander First Destroyer Flotilla, 1920–1922
- Rear Admiral Edward Dyke Acland (1878–1968), Naval Attaché to King George V
- Rear Admiral James Ashton (1883–1951), Aide-de-camp to King Edward VIII
- Vice Admiral Sir Richard Lane-Poole (1883–1971), Commander Australian Fleet, 1936–1938
- Rear Admiral Julian Patterson (1884–1972), commanded HMS Hood
- Vice Admiral Sir Cecil Ponsonby Talbot (1884–1970), Aide-de-camp to King George V and Director of Dockyards at the Admiralty, 1937–1946
- Major General Robert Glunicke (1886–1963), Aide-de-camp to King George VI, 1939–1940, and Commandant, Plymouth Division, Royal Marines, 1939–1941
- Admiral SirRobert Burnett (1887–1959), Commander-in-Chief, South Atlantic, 1944–1946, and Commander-in-Chief, Plymouth, 1946–1950
- Rear Admiral Hector Mackenzie Woodhouse (1889–1971)
- Admiral SirGeoffrey Audley Miles (1890–1986), Head of British Military Mission, Moscow, 1941–1943, Commander-in-Chief, Levant, 1943, Naval Force Commander, Eastern Expeditionary Force, 1943, Deputy Naval Commander, South East Asia Command, 1943–1944, Flag officer, Western Mediterranean, 1944–1945, Senior British Representative on the Tripartite Naval Commission, 1945–1946, and last Commander-in-Chief, Indian Navy of the unified Royal Indian Navy, 1946–1947
- |Rear Admiral Laurence Boutwood (1898–1982), Fleet Supply Officer, British Pacific Fleet, 1945–1946, assistant director of Plans at the Admiralty, 1946–1948, Fleet Supply Officer, Mediterranean Station, 1950–1953, and Command Supply Officer, Portsmouth, 1953–1956
- Vice Admiral Sir Charles Hughes-Hallett (1898–1985), Chief of Staff, Home Fleet, 1950–1951, Head of British Naval Mission, Washington, 1952–1954
- Vice Admiral John Hughes-Hallett (1901–1972), Naval Commander during the Dieppe Raid, 1942, Commodore commanding Channel Assault Force and Naval Chief of Staff, 1942–1943, Head of Naval Branch, Supreme Allied Command, 1943, Vice-Controller of the Navy, 1950–1952, Flag Officer, Heavy Squadron, Home Fleet, 1952–1953, Conservative MP for Croydon, 1954–1964, credited with proposing the idea of the Mulberry harbour
- Rear Admiral Keith McNeil Campbell-Walter (1904–1976), Aide-de-camp to Queen Elizabeth II, Flag Officer, Germany, and Commander of Allied Naval Forces Northern Area, Central Europe, 1955–1958
- Vice Admiral Sir Raymond Hawkins (1909–1987), Fourth Sea Lord and Vice Controller of the Navy, 1963–1964, Chief of Fleet Support, 1964–1967
- Rear Admiral Kenneth Farnhill (1913–1983), Director of the Management of Intelligence, Ministry of Defence, 1966–1969
- Admiral of the Fleet Sir Michael Le Fanu (1913–1970), Director-General, Naval Weapons, 1958–1960, Controller of the Navy, 1961–1965, Commander-in-Chief, Middle East, 1965–1968, and First Sea Lord, 1968–1970
- Rear Admiral James Dunbar Cook (1921–2007), Assistant Chief of the Naval Staff, 1973–1975
- Rear Admiral Robin Trower Hogg (born 1932), Flag Officer, First Flotilla, 1984–1986, and Chief of Staff to the Commander-in-Chief Fleet, 1986–1987

=== Army ===
- Major General William Carmichael Russell (1824–1905), served during the First Anglo-Sikh War, 1845–1846, and during the Indian Mutiny, 1857
- General Sir Henry Augustus Smyth (1825–1906), served during the Crimean War and was present at the Siege of Sevastopol, 1854–1855, General Officer Commanding, South Africa, 1886–1889, Governor-General of Cape Colony, 1889, High Commissioner for Southern Africa, 1889, and Governor of Malta, 1890–1893
- Major General Francis Glanville (1827–1910)
- Major General Willoughby Clarke (1833–1909), served during the Santhal rebellion, 1855–1856, and during the Second Opium War, 1856–1860
- Lieutenant General John Le Mesurier (1834–1903), served during the Anglo-Persian War, 1856–1857
- Major General George Elphinstone Erskine (1841–1912), served during the Indian Mutiny, 1857
- Lieutenant Colonel Arthur Meek (1883–1955)
- Major General George More-Molyneux (1851–1903), served during the Second Anglo-Afghan War, 1878–1880, the Suakin Expedition, 1884–1885, the Third Anglo-Burmese War, 1885–1889, and during the Tirah Campaign, 1897–1898
- Major General William Cross Barratt (1862–1940), General Officer Commanding, 9th (Secunderabad) Division and General Officer Commanding, 16th Indian Division
- General Sir Walter Braithwaite (1865–1945), General Officer Commanding-in-Chief Western Command, India, 1920–1923, General Officer Commanding-in-Chief Scottish Command, 1923–1926, General Officer Commanding-in-Chief Eastern Command, 1926–1927, Adjutant-General to the Forces, 1927–1931
- Major General John Hill (1866–1935), General Officer Commanding, 52nd (Lowland) Infantry Division, 1916–1918
- Major General Louis Lipsett (1874–1918), General Officer Commanding, 3rd Canadian Division, 1916–1918, General Officer Commanding, 4th Infantry Division, 1918
- Field Marshal Sir Cyril Deverell (1874–1947), General Officer Commanding-in-Chief Western Command, 1931–1933, General Officer Commanding-in-Chief Eastern Command, 1933–1936, Chief of the Imperial General Staff, 1936–1937
- Major General Sir Digby Shuttleworth (1876–1948), President of the Allied Commission of Control, Turkey, 1920–1923
- Major General Sir Horace de Courcy Martelli (1877–1959), General Officer Commanding, 42nd (East Lancashire) Division, 1925–1930, Commandant, Shanghai Defence Force, 1927–1928, Major General, Southern Command, 1930–1934, Lieutenant Governor of Jersey, 1934–1939
- Lieutenant General Sir William Montgomery Thomson (1877–1963), military governor of Baku, 1918
- Major General Sir William Twiss (1879–1962), General Officer Commanding, Army in Burma, 1937–1939
- Major General Sir Hubert Huddleston (1880–1950), Commandant, Sudan Defence Force and General Officer Commanding, Sudan, 1925–1930, and Governor-General of the Sudan, 1940–1947
- Major General Hugh MacMahon (1880–1939), Aide-de-camp to King George V, and Quartermaster General, Northern Command, 1933–1937
- Major General Sir Claude Liardet (1881–1966), General Officer Commanding, 56th (London) Division, 1938–1941, and first Commandant-General of the RAF Regiment, 1942–1945
- Major General Maxwell Brander (1884–1972), War Office, 1937–1940, Ministry of Supply, 1941–1947
- Major General Lancelot Hickes (1884–1965), War Office, 1939–1941
- Major General Sir Guy Riley (1884–1964), War Office, 1937–1943
- Major General Algernon Fuller (1885–1970), War Office, 1938–1940, Ministry of Supply, 1940–1941, and inventor of the Fullerphone
- Lieutenant General Sir William Baker (1888–1964), Adjutant-General of India, 1941–1944
- Major General Austin Timeous Miller CB MC & Bar (1888–1947), Scottish Command, 1941–1945
- Major General Sir Noel Holmes (1891–1982), War Office, 1939–1946
- Major General Christopher Maltby (1891–1980), Commander British Troops in China, 1941
- General Sir Colville Wemyss (1891–1959), Adjutant-General to the Forces, 1940–1941, Head of British Army Mission, Washington, 1941–1942, Military Secretary to the Secretary of State for War, 1942–1945
- Major General Sir Leslie Gordon Phillips (1892–1966), Director of Signals, War Office, 1943–1946
- Major General Sir Eustace Tickell (1893–1972), Engineer-in-Chief, War Office, 1944–1948
- Lieutenant General Sir Harold Rawdon Briggs (1894–1952), Commander-in-Chief, Burma Command, 1946–1948
- Major General Alfred Curtis (1894–1971), General Officer Commanding, 14th Indian Infantry Division, and Aide-de-camp to King George VI
- Major General Raymond Briggs (1895–1984), General Officer Commanding, 1st Armoured Division, 1942–1943
- General Sir Sidney Kirkman (1895–1982), General Officer Commanding, 50th (Northumbrian) Division, 1942–1944, General Officer Commanding, XIII Corps, 1944–1945, Deputy Chief of the Imperial General Staff, 1945–1947, and Quartermaster-General to the Forces, 1947–1950
- Major General Bernard Cooke Dixon (1896–1973), engineer-in-charge, General Headquarters, Middle East, 1944–1947, and chief engineer, Headquarters, Western Command, 1947–1948
- Major General Sir Reginald Kerr (1897–1974), Director of Supplies and Transport, War Office, 1943–1946
- Major General Francis St David Benwell Lejeune (1899–1984), Commander, Anti-Aircraft Group, 1944–1946, War Office, 1946–1949
- Genera Sir Frank Simpson (1899–1986), Chief of Staff to Field Marshal Bernard Montgomery, 1940–1942, deputy director of Military Operations at the War Office, 1942–1943, Director of Military Operations at the War Office, 1943–1945, Assistant Chief of the Imperial General Staff, 1945–1946, Vice Chief of the Imperial General Staff, 1946–1948, General Officer Commanding-in-Chief Western Command, 1948–1952, Commandant, Imperial Defence College, 1952–1954
- Major General Robert Cottrell-Hill (1903–1965), Commandant, British Sector, Berlin, 1955–1956
- Lieutenant Colonel Arthur Cocks (1904–1944), first British Army officer to be killed on D-Day
- Major General Sir Nigel Tapp (1904–1991), General Officer Commanding, East Africa Command, 1957–1960
- Major General Gerald Kellett (1905–1973), Director General of Artillery, War Office, 1957–1960
- Lieutenant General Sir William Pike (1905–1993), Vice Chief of the Imperial General Staff, 1960–1963
- Major General Kenneth Bastyan (1906–1975), Chief Signal Officer, British Army of the Rhine and Northern Army Group, 1957–1960
- Major General Henry Maughan Liardet (1906–1996), Chief of Staff, British Joint Services Mission, Washington, 1956–1958
- Major General Ronald Urquhart (1906–1968), Director of Combined Operations, 1947–1949, Chief of Staff, Western Command, 1956, and Commandant, Royal Military Academy Sandhurst, 1957–1960
- Major General Michael Whitworth Prynne (1912–1977), deputy director, War Office, 1960–1964, and Chief of Staff, Headquarters, Southern Command, 1964–1967
- Major General Edward Maitland-Makgill-Crichton (1916–2009), General Officer Commanding, 51st (Highland) Division, 1966–1968
- Lieutenant General Sir John Read (1917–1987), Director of Military Operations, Ministry of Defence, 1968–1970, Assistant Chief of the Defence Staff, Ministry of Defence, 1970–1971, and Director of International Military Staff, NATO Headquarters, Brussels, 1971–1975
- Major General Colin Shortis (born 1934), Director of Infantry, British Army, 1983–1986, and General Officer Commanding, North West District, 1986–1989
- Major General Timothy Toyne Sewell (born 1941), Commandant, Royal Military Academy Sandhurst, 1991–1994
- Captain Aubrey Beaty (1916–2009), first British soldier to enter Germany after D-Day
- Lieutenant-Colonel Lewis Balfour Oatts (1902–1992)

=== Air Force ===
- Air Vice-Marshal Sir Sefton Brancker (1877–1930), director-general of Civil Aviation, 1922–1930, and victim of the R101 disaster
- Air Chief Marshal Sir Charles Burnett (1882–1945), Deputy Chief of the Air Staff, 1931–1932, Air Officer Commanding British Forces, Iraq, 1932–1935, Air Officer Commanding-in-Chief, RAF Training Command, 1936–1939, and Chief of the Air Staff, Royal Australian Air Force, 1939–1942
- Marshal of the RAF Cyril Newall, 1st Baron Newall (1886–1963), Deputy Chief of the Air Staff, 1926–1931, Air Officer Commanding, Middle East Command, 1931–1934, Air Member for Supply and Organisation, 1935–1937, Chief of the Air Staff, 1937–1940, and Governor-General of New Zealand, 1940–1946
- Air Vice-Marshal Sir Paul Maltby (1892–1971), Air Officer Commanding, Java, 1942, and Black Rod, 1946–1962
- Major Charles Dawson Booker (1897–1918), First World War flying ace
- Air Vice-Marshal Hugh Hamilton Brookes (1904–1988), Air Officer Commanding, Rhodesia, 1951–1954, Air Officer Commanding, Iraq, 1954–1956, and Air Officer Commanding, No 25 Group, RAF Flying Training Command, 1956–1958
- Air Vice-Marshal Douglas Ryley (1905–1985), Air Officer Commanding and Commandant, RAF Henlow, 1949–1952, Director of Armament Engineering, Air Ministry, 1954–1957, and Director of Guided Weapons Engineering, Air Ministry, 1957–1958
- Air Vice-Marshal Brian Courtenay Yarde (1905–1986), Commandant-General of the RAF Regiment, 1954–1957
- Marshal of the RAF Sir Thomas Pike (1906–1983), Deputy Chief of the Air Staff, 1953–1956, Air Officer Commanding-in-Chief, RAF Fighter Command, 1956–1959, Chief of the Air Staff, 1960–1964, and Deputy Supreme Allied Commander Europe, 1964–1967
- Air Vice-Marshal Clayton Boyce (1907–1987), Secretary General of Allied Air Forces, Central Europe, 1953–1954, Air Officer Commanding, Cyprus and the Levant, 1954–1956
- Air Vice-Marshal Hubert Chapman (1910–1972), Air Officer Commanding, No. 43 Group, 1950–1951
- Air Chief Marshal Sir David Lee (1912–2004), the United Kingdom's Military Representative to NATO, 1968–1971
- Group Captain Brian Kingcome DSO DFC & Bar (1917–1994), Second World War flying ace
- Air Vice-Marshal Michael Adams (born 1934), Assistant Chief of the Air Staff for Operational Requirements, Ministry of Defence, 1984–1986, Senior Directing Officer, Royal College of Defence Studies, 1987–1988

== Aviation ==
- Commander Sir Walter Windham (1868–1942), pioneering aviator who established the world's first airmail services
- Claude Grahame-White (1879–1959), pioneering aviator who made the world's first night-time takeoff
- John Dudley North (1893–1968), aircraft designer and chairman of Boulton Paul Aircraft
- Group CaptainGeorge Bulman (1896–1963), chief test pilot and director at Hawker Aircraft
- Bob Feilden (1917–2004), mechanical engineer, an essential part of the Power Jets team that developed the first jet engine with Sir Frank Whittle, 1940–1946, author of the seminal Report of the Feilden Committee on Engineering Design, 1963, and Director General of the British Standards Institution, 1970–1981

== The church ==
- Revd Canon John Hensman (1780–1864), fellow of Corpus Christi College, Cambridge, and prolific church builder
- Revd Fr William Lockhart (1820–1892), first of the Oxford Movement to convert from Anglicanism to Catholicism
- Revd Canon George Maclear (1833–1902), theological writer
- William Percival Johnson (1854–1928), missionary in Africa
- Revd Walter Ruthven Pym (1856–1908), bishop of Mauritius, 1898–1903, Bishop of Bombay, 1903–1908, and grandfather of Francis Pym, Foreign Secretary under Margaret Thatcher
- Revd Ernest Augustus Anderson (1859–1945), bishop of Riverina, 1895–1925
- Revd Hubert Burge (1862–1925), headmaster of Winchester College, 1901–1910, Bishop of Southwark, 1910–1919, and bishop of Oxford, 1919–1925
- Revd William Surtees (1871–1956), bishop of Crediton, 1930–1954
- Revd John Gregg (1873–1961), Bishop of Ossory, Ferns and Leighlin, 1915–1920, archbishop of Dublin and primate of Ireland, 1920–1939, archbishop of Armagh and primate of All Ireland, 1939–1959
- Revd Walter Carey (1875–1955), bishop of Bloemfontein, 1921–1935, theological writer, and British Isles XV rugby international
- Revd John Weller (1880–1969), bishop of the Falkland Islands, 1934–1945
- Revd Richard Dyke Acland (1881–1954), bishop of Bombay, 1929–1947
- Revd Bertram Lasbrey (1881–1976), bishop on the Niger, 1922–1945
- Rev Wilfred Askwith (1890–1962), Bishop of Blackburn, 1942–1954, and Bishop of Gloucester, 1954–1962
- Revd Noel Hall (1891–1962), Bishop of Chota Nagpur, 1936–1957
- Revd David Farmbrough (1929–2013), bishop of Bedford, 1981–1993
- Revd Robin Smith (born 1936), bishop of Hertford, 1990–2001
- Canon David Watson (1933–1984), vicar of St Cuthbert's Church, York/St. Michael-le-Belfry, York, 1965–1982

== Civil and diplomatic services ==
- Vivian Gordon Bowden (1884–1942), Australian businessman, public servant and diplomat, Australian official representative in Singapore (1941–1942).
- Sir Walter Hillier (1849–1927), diplomat, author, Sinologist and professor of Chinese, King's College London
- Sir Aubrey Vere Symonds (1874–1931), permanent secretary, Board of Education, 1925–1931
- Sir Edward Crowe (1877–1960), Comptroller-General, Department for Overseas Trade, 1928–1937
- Gilbert Campion, 1st Baron Campion (1882–1958), Clerk of the House of Commons, 1937–1948
- Sir Harold MacMichael (1882–1969), Governor of Tanganyika, 1934–1938, High Commissioner to Palestine, 1938–1944
- Sir John FitzGerald Moylan (1882–1967), Under-Secretary of State at the Home Office, 1940–1945
- Sir Bernard Rawdon Reilly (1882–1966), British Resident in Aden, 1931–1932, Chief Commissioner of Aden, 1932–1937, Governor of Aden, 1937–1940
- Sir William Castle Cleary (1886–1971), Principal Private Secretary to the President of the Board of Education, 1931–1935, Principal Assistant Secretary for Elementary Education, 1940–1945, and Deputy Secretary, Ministry of Education, 1945–1950
- Bertram Lamb Pearson (1893–1984), Principal Private Secretary to the President of the Board of Education, 1937–1946, and Under Secretary, Ministry of Education, 1946–1955
- Sir Charles Belgrave (1894–1969), Chief Administrator to the rulers of Bahrain, 1926–1957
- Herbert Gybbon-Monypenny (1895–1988), Ambassador to the Dominican Republic, 1953–1955
- Sir Percivale Liesching (1895–1973), Permanent Under-Secretary, Ministry of Food, 1946–1948, Permanent Under-Secretary of State for Commonwealth Relations, 1949–1955, and High Commissioner to South Africa, 1955–1958
- Sir Pierson Dixon (1904–1965), Principal Private Secretary to the Foreign Secretary, 1943–1948, Ambassador to Czechoslovakia, 1948–1950, Deputy Under-Secretary of State at the Foreign Office, 1950–1954, Permanent Representative of the United Kingdom to the United Nations, 1954–1960, and Ambassador to France, 1960–1965
- Sir George Godber (1908–2009), Chief Medical Officer, 1960–1973
- Sir George Clutton (1909–1970), Ambassador to the Philippines, 1955–1959, and Ambassador to Poland, 1960–1966
- Ian Clayton Mackenzie (1909–2009), Ambassador to South Korea, 1967–1969
- Sir Bruce Fraser (1910–1993), Permanent Secretary, Ministry of Health, 1960–1964, Joint Permanent Under-Secretary of State, Department of Education and Science, 1964–1965, Permanent Secretary, Ministry of Land and Natural Resources, 1965–1966, Comptroller and Auditor General, Exchequer, 1966–1971
- Thomas Rogers (1912–1999), Ambassador to Colombia, 1970–1973
- John Glendwr Owen (1914–1977), Under Secretary at HM Treasury, 1959–1973
- John Gordon Doubleday (1920–1982), Ambassador to Liberia, 1978–1980
- Peter Tripp (1921–2010), Ambassador to Libya, 1970–1974, High Commissioner to Singapore, 1974–1978, and Ambassador to Thailand, 1978–1981
- Sir James Hennessy (born 1923), ambassador to Uruguay, 1971–1972, high commissioner to Uganda, 1973–1976, Ambassador to Rwanda, 1973–1976, Governor of Belize, 1980–1981, and Her Majesty's Chief Inspector of Prisons, 1982–1987
- Peter Maxey(1930-2014), under secretary at the Cabinet Office, 1978–1981, ambassador to the German Democratic Republic, 1981–1984, and ambassador to the United Nations, 1984–1986
- Sir Alan Bailey (born 1931), Principal Private Secretary to the Chancellor of the Exchequer, 1971–1973, Under Secretary at HM Treasury, 1973–1978, Deputy Secretary at HM Treasury, 1978–1983, Permanent Secretary at HM Treasury, 1983–1985, and Permanent Secretary at the Department for Transport, 1986–1991
- William Myles Knighton (1931-2023), Principal Private Secretary to the Minister of Technology, 1966–1968, Assistant Secretary, Department of Trade, 1967–1974, Under Secretary, Department of Trade, 1974–1978, Deputy Secretary, Department of Trade, 1978–1983, Deputy Secretary, Department for Transport, 1983–1986, and Principal Establishment and Finance Officer, Department of Trade and Industry, 1986–1991
- Sir Michael Burton (born 1937), British Minister in Berlin, 1985–1992, Assistant Under-Secretary of State at the Foreign Office, 1993, and Ambassador to the Czech Republic, 1994–1997
- Sir Allan Ramsay (1937-2022), Ambassador to the Lebanon, 1988–1990, Ambassador to the Sudan, 1990–1991, and Ambassador to Morocco, 1992–1996
- John Martin (1943–1999), High Commissioner to Malawi, 1993–1998
- Paul Wright (born 1946), Under Secretary, Department for Culture, Media and Sport, 1992–1999
- Richard Northern (born 1954), Ambassador to Libya, 2010–2011
- John Hawkins (born 1960), Ambassador to Qatar, 2008–2012

== Industry and commerce ==
- Sir William Harpur (c1496–1574), Sheriff of the City of London, 1556–1557, Lord Mayor of London, 1561–1562
- Julius Drewe (1856–1931), creator of Home and Colonial Stores, and builder of Castle Drogo, Devon
- Sir Reginald Butler, 1st Baronet (1866–1933), chairman of United Dairies
- Sir Harold Yarrow, 2nd Baronet (1884–1962), chairman and managing director of Yarrow Shipbuilders and chairman of Clydesdale Bank
- Donal Morphy (1900–1975), founder of the ubiquitous Morphy Richards electrical manufacturer of domestic appliances
- Sir John Howard(1901–1986), civil engineer responsible for construction of the Severn Bridge, the Humber Bridge, the Forth Road Bridge and the Channel Tunnel
- Sir Peter Parker (1924–2002), chairman of British Rail, 1976–1983
- Sir Peter Hunt (1933–1997), chairman and managing director of Land Securities, 1978–1997
- Derek Bonham (1943–2007), CEO of Hanson Group, 1992–1997, chairman of Imperial Tobacco, 1996–2007, chairman of Cadbury Schweppes, 2000–2003, and chairman of Marconi, 2001–2002
- Miles Young (born 1954), chairman and CEO of Ogilvy & Mather, 2009–
- Andrew Horton (born 1962), CEO of Beazley, 2008–2021

== Journalism ==
- William White (1807–1882), parliamentary sketch writer
- Henry Corbet (1820–1878), agricultural writer and editor
- E H D Sewell (1872–1947), author, cricket and rugby journalist, Essex and MCC cricketer
- Hugo Tyerman (1880–1977), author and journalist
- Major Peter Lawless (1891–1945), war correspondent for The Daily Telegraph, killed during the Battle of Remagen
- Henry Longhurst (1909–1978), BBC sports commentator and golf writer, Golfing Correspondent of The Sunday Times, Conservative MP for Acton, 1943–1945
- Peter Stursberg (1913–2014), Canadian writer, broadcaster and war correspondent
- Pearce Wright (1933–2005), Science Editor of The Times, 1974–1990
- Michael De-la-Noy (1934–2002), author, journalist and gay rights advocate
- Richard Lindley (born 1936), BBC and ITN journalist
- John Percival (1937–2005), BBC and Channel 4 documentary film maker
- Michael Brunson (born 1940), ITN Political Editor, Diplomatic Editor and Washington Correspondent
- Robert Hewison (born 1943), Theatre Critic of The Sunday Times
- John Witherow (born 1952), Editor of The Sunday Times, 1995–2013, Editor of The Times, 2013–
- Will Gompertz (born 1965), BBC Arts Editor
- Ned Boulting (born 1969), author, sports journalist and commentator

== Law ==
- Sir John Leach (1760–1834), Judge, Privy Councillor, Whig and Tory MP for Seaford, 1806–1816, Chancellor of the Duchy of Cornwall, 1816–1818, Vice Chancellor of England, 1818–1827, and Master of the Rolls, 1827–1834
- Erskine May, 1st Baron Farnborough (1815–1886), constitutional theorist, Privy Councillor, Clerk of the House of Commons, 1871–1886, and the original author of Erskine May: Parliamentary Practice
- Henry Hawkins, 1st Baron Brampton (1817–1907), High Court Judge, 1876–1898, and Privy Councillor
- Sir Henry Verey (1836–1920), official referee of the Supreme Court of Judicature, 1876–1920
- Sir Frank Beaman (1858–1928), High Court Judge, Bombay, 1906–1918
- Sir Reginald Ward Poole (1864–1941), President of the Law Society, 1933–1934
- Sir Henry Gompertz (1867–1930), Supreme Court Judge, Hong Kong, 1909–1925, and Chief Justice of the Federated Malay States, 1925–1929
- Sir Babington Bennett Newbould (1867–1937), High Court Judge, Calcutta, 1916–1927
- Sir George Arthur Harwin Branson (1871–1951), High Court Judge, 1921–1939, Privy Councillor, and grandfather of Sir Richard Branson
- Sir Cecil Fforde (1875–1951), High Court Judge, Lahore, 1922–1931
- Saul Solomon (1875–1960), Supreme Court Judge, South Africa, 1927–1945
- Sir Lynden Macassey (1876–1963), labour lawyer
- Harold Blacker (1889–1944), High Court Judge, Lahore, 1937–1944
- Sir Gerald Osborne Slade (1891–1962), High Court Judge, 1948–1962
- Sir Audley McKisack (1903–1966), Attorney General of Nigeria, 1951–1956, Chief Justice of Uganda, 1956–1962, President of the High Court of the Federation of South Arabia, 1964–1966, and Appeal Court Judge of the Bahamas and Bermuda, 1965–1966
- Sir Phillip Bridges (1922–2007), Solicitor General of The Gambia, 1963–1964, Attorney General of the Gambia, 1964–1968, and Chief Justice of The Gambia, 1968–1983
- Sir Stephen Mitchell (born 1941), High Court Judge, 1993–2003

== Literature ==
- John Pomfret (1667–1702), poet
- Samuel Palmer (1741–1813), biographer
- Foster Barham Zincke (1817–1893), antiquary
- Morley Roberts (1857–1942), novelist and short story writer
- Frederick Carruthers Cornell (1867–1921), South African short story writer and poet
- Saki (1870–1916), short story writer
- Hesketh Pearson (1887–1964), biographer
- Noel Carrington (1895–1989), originator of Puffin Books, and brother of the artist Dora Carrington
- John Armitage (1910–1980), Editor of Encyclopædia Britannica, 1949–1967
- C E T Warren (1912–1988), author of Above Us The Waves
- John Fowles (1926–2005), novelist, author of The Magus and The French Lieutenant's Woman
- Jonathon Green (born 1948), lexicographer
- Shoo Rayner (born 1956), author and illustrator of children's books

== Medicine ==
- Robert Elliot (1864–1936), surgeon and author
- George Drummond Robinson (1864–1950), obstetrician
- Sir Maurice Craig (1866–1935), psychiatrist to Virginia Woolf and to the future King Edward VIII, and pioneer in the treatment of mental illness
- Major General Francis Hutchinson (1870–1931), Surgeon to the King
- Frank Eve (1871–1952), physician who gave his name to the "Eve Method" of artificial respiration
- William Branson (1874–1950), physician, author, and great uncle of Sir Richard Branson
- James Radclyffe McDonagh (1881–1965), surgeon and author
- Sir Adolphe Abrahams (1883–1967), physician and founder of British sports science
- Felix Warden Brown (1908–1972), psychiatrist
- Charles Enrique Dent (1911–1976), physician and biochemist who gave his name to Dent's Disease
- George Crichton Wells (1914–1999), dermatologist who gave his name to Wells' Syndrome
- Frank Cockett(1916–2014), surgeon, author and art historian
- John MacFarlane Cliff (1921–1972), Professor of Naval Medicine, Royal Hospital Haslar
- Major General Michael Brown (1931–1993), Director of Army Medicine and Physician to the Queen
- Rory Shaw (born 1954), Professor of Respiratory Medicine, Imperial College School of Medicine, 1997–

== Music ==
- C H Bovill (1878–1918), lyricist, songwriter, author, and collaborator with P G Wodehouse
- Dr Marmaduke Conway (1885–1961), organist and writer
- Darrell Fancourt (1886–1953), bass-baritone singer who starred in more than 10,000 performances with the D'Oyly Carte Opera Company
- Herbert Kennedy Andrews (1904–1965), Fellow in Music, New College, Oxford, composer, musicologist and organist
- Richard Kerr (born 1944), songwriter
- Frank Musker (born 1951), composer and songwriter
- Alec Dankworth (born 1960), jazz bassist
- Marius de Vries (born 1961), composer and record producer
- Andrew Manze (born 1965), associate director of the Academy of Ancient Music, 1996–2003, artistic director of The English Concert, 2003–2007, principal conductor and artistic director of the Helsingborg Symphony Orchestra, 2006–
- Philip Stopford (born 1977), choir director and composer of sacred choral music
- Grzegorz Turnau (born 1967), composer, pianist, poet and singer
- Xander Rawlins (born 1984), singer-songwriter and documentary film maker

== Politicians and statesmen ==
- John Williams (c1519-c1561), MP for Bedford, 1554–1555
- Thomas Barnard (1830–1909), Whig MP for Bedford, 1857–1859
- Lieutenant Commander Norman Carlyle Craig (1868–1919), Conservative MP for the Isle of Thanet, 1910–1919
- Sir Walter Preston (1875–1946), Conservative MP for Mile End, 1918–1923, Conservative MP for Cheltenham, 1928–1937
- Auberon Herbert, 9th Baron Lucas (1876–1916), Liberal politician and fighter pilot, Privy Councillor, Under-Secretary of State for War, 1908–1911, Under-Secretary of State for the Colonies, 1911, Parliamentary Secretary to the Board of Agriculture and Fisheries, 1911–1914, President of the Board of Agriculture, 1914–1915
- Sir Richard Wells, 1st Baronet (1879–1957), Conservative MP for Bedford, 1922–1945
- Colonel Eric Harrison (1880–1948), Australian MP, 1931–1937
- Air Commodore Sir Frank Nelson (1883–1966), Conservative MP for Stroud, 1924–1931, and the first head of Special Operations Executive, 1940–1942
- Leslie Ruthven Pym (1884–1945), Conservative MP for Monmouth, 1939–1945, and father of Francis Pym, Foreign Secretary under Margaret Thatcher
- Charles Theodore Te Water (1887–1964), president of the Assembly of the League of Nations, 1933–1934
- Sir Walter Jackson Cooper (1888–1973), Australian Senator, 1928–1968, Minister of Repatriation, 1949–1960
- Sir Joseph Trounsell Gilbert (1888–1975), Chief Justice and President of the Senate of Bermuda, 1952–1958
- Alan Grahame Brown (1913–1972), Labour and Conservative MP for Tottenham, 1959–1964
- Sir Anthony Fell (1914–1998), Conservative MP for Great Yarmouth, 1951–1983
- Joseph Godber, Baron Godber of Willington (1914–1980), Privy Councillor, Conservative MP for Grantham, 1951–1979, Parliamentary Secretary to the Ministry of Agriculture, Fisheries and Food, 1957–1960, Under-Secretary of State for Foreign Affairs, 1960–1961, Minister of State for Foreign Affairs, 1961–1963, Secretary of State for War, 1963, Minister of Labour, 1963–1964, Minister of State for Foreign Affairs, 1970–1972, and Minister of Agriculture, Fisheries and Food, 1972–1974
- Major Richard Harden (1916–2000), Ulster Unionist MP for Armagh, 1948–1954
- Major Geraint Morgan (1920–1995), Conservative MP for Denbigh, 1959–1983, and champion of the Welsh language
- Stephen Ross, Baron Ross of Newport (1926–1993), Liberal MP for the Isle of Wight, 1974–1987
- Michael Morris, Baron Naseby (born 1936), Privy Councillor, Conservative MP for Northampton South, 1974–1997
- Krishnan Srinivasan (born 1937), Indian Foreign Secretary, 1994–1995, Deputy Secretary-General of the Commonwealth of Nations, 1995–2002
- Paddy Ashdown, Baron Ashdown of Norton-sub-Hamdon (1941–2018), Privy Councillor, Liberal Democrat MP for Yeovil, 1983–2001, leader of the Liberal Democrats, 1988–1999, international High Representative for Bosnia and Herzegovina, 2002–2006
- Sir Gerry Neale (born 1941), Conservative MP for North Cornwall, 1979–1992
- John Carlisle (1942–2019), Conservative MP for Luton, 1979–1997
- John Taylor, Baron Taylor of Holbeach (born 1943), Conservative politician, Minister at the Home Office, 2012–2014, and Government Chief Whip in the House of Lords, 2014–
- Bob Clay (born 1946), Labour MP for Sunderland North, 1983–1992
- Malcolm Harbour (born 1947), Conservative MEP for the West Midlands, 1999–2014
- Desmond Swayne (born 1956), Conservative MP for New Forest West, 1997–, Parliamentary Private Secretary to David Cameron, 2010–2012, and Minister of State for International Development, 2014–
- Brooks Newmark (born 1958), Conservative MP for Braintree, Essex, 2005–2015, and Minister for Civil Society, 2014
- Neil Coyle (born 1978), Labour Party Member of Parliament (MP) for Bermondsey and Old Southwark

== Sport ==
=== All-rounders ===
- Percy Christopherson (1866–1921), England rugby international and Kent cricketer
- Freddie Brooks (1883–1947), England rugby international and Rhodesia cricketer
- Frank Brooks (1884–1952), Rhodesia cricketer, rugby international and tennis player
- Lieutenant Colonel Stan Harris (1894–1973), England and British Lions rugby international, water polo international, South Africa Davis Cup tennis player, South Africa light-heavyweight boxing champion, and Wimbledon mixed doubles winner, who turned down a place in the 1920 Great Britain Olympic team
- Gilbert Cook (1911–1979), England rugby international and Ireland cricketer

=== Athletics ===
- Harold Abrahams (1899–1978), Olympic sprinter and long jumper, winner of the gold medal in 1924 for the 100-metre sprint; a feat portrayed in the film Chariots of Fire
- Brigadier Dick Webster (1914–2009), Olympic pole vaulter, 1936 and 1948

=== Cricket ===
- William Weighell (1846–1905), Sussex cricketer
- William Woof (1858–1937), Gloucestershire and MCC cricketer
- Herbert Orr (1865–1940), Western Australia cricketer
- Ralph Joyce (1878–1908), Leicestershire cricketer
- Percy Sherwell (1880–1948), South Africa cricketer
- Harold Baumgartner (1883–1938), South Africa cricketer
- Arthur Cantrell (1883–1954), Royal Navy first-class cricketer
- Francis Joyce (1886–1958), Leicestershire cricketer
- Bertram Peel (1881–1945), Oxford University and Scotland first-class cricketer
- Denis Peel (1886–1927), Oxford University first-class cricketer
- Frank Ryan (1888–1954), Hampshire and Glamorgan first-class cricketer
- Arthur Cocks (1904–1944), British Army cricketer
- Lancelot Robinson (1905–1935), MCC cricketer
- Cyril Reed (1906–1991), Madras cricketer
- William Sime (1909–1983), Nottinghamshire cricketer, and Judge
- Brian Disbury (1929-2016), Kent cricketer
- Michael Allen (1933–1995), Northamptonshire, MCC and Derbyshire cricketer
- Martin Meeson (1933–1995), Cambridge University first-class cricketer
- Rex Collinge (born 1935), Combined Services first-class cricketer
- Ian Peck (born 1957), Northamptonshire cricketer
- Robin Boyd-Moss (born 1959), Northamptonshire cricketer
- Toby Bailey (born 1976), Northamptonshire cricketer
- Will Smith (born 1982), Hampshire, Durham and Nottinghamshire cricketer
- Adrian Shankar (born 1982), Worcestershire cricketer
- Sir Alastair Cook (born 1984), Essex, MCC and England cricketer, and captain of the England cricket team
- Alex Wakely (born 1988), Northamptonshire cricketer and captain of the England Under-19 cricket team
- James Kettleborough (born 1992), Northamptonshire cricketer
- Emilio Gay (born 2000), Northamptonshire and (from 2025) Durham cricketer

=== Equestrianism ===
- Brigadier Lyndon Bolton (1899–1995), Olympic horseman, 1948

=== Fencing ===
- Colonel Ronald Bruce Campbell (1878–1963), Olympic fencer, 1920

=== Football ===
- Harold Henman (1879–1969), international footballer who played for both South Africa and Argentina

=== Hockey ===
- Stefan Tewes (born 1967), Olympic gold medalist in hockey, 1992
- Sven Meinhardt (born 1971), Olympic gold medalist in hockey, 1992

=== Motor sport ===
- Dan Wheldon (1978–2011), racing driver, Indianapolis 500 winner, 2005 and 2011

=== Rowing ===
- William Crofts (1846–1912), rower
- Jack Beresford (1899–1977), Olympic rower, winner of five medals (three gold, two silver) at five Olympic Games in succession, 1920–1936
- Harold Morphy (1902–1987), Olympic rower, 1924
- Edward Vaughan Bevan (1907–1988), Olympic rower, gold medalist, 1928
- William Windham (1926-2021), Olympic rower, 1952
- James Crowden (1927–2016), Olympic rower, 1952
- Michael Beresford (born 1934), Olympic rower, 1960
- Phelan Hill (born 1979), Olympic rower, bronze and gold medalist, 2012 and 2016

=== Rugby ===
- Major General Sir Robert Henderson (1858–1924), England rugby international, and Physician to the King
- Philip Jacob (1875–p1927), England rugby international
- Francis Palmer (1877–1951), England rugby international
- Curly Hammond (1879–1963), England rugby international
- Basil Maclear (1881–1915), Ireland rugby international
- Ernest Chambers (1882–1946), England rugby international
- Cecil Milton (1884–1961), England rugby international
- Jumbo Milton (1885–1915), England rugby international whilst still a pupil at Bedford School
- Henry Vassall (1887–1949), England rugby international
- Sir Arthur Blakiston, 7th Baronet (1892–1974), England and British Lions rugby international
- Sir Basil McFarland, 2nd Baronet (1898–1986), Ireland rugby international
- Robert Jones (1900–1970), Wales rugby international
- Leo Oakley (1926–1981), England rugby international
- Budge Rogers (born 1933), England and British Lions rugby international
- Martin Bayfield (born 1966), England and British Lions rugby international
- Andy Gomarsall (born 1974), England rugby international
- David Callam (born 1983), Scotland rugby international
- George Furbank (born 1996), England rugby international

=== Tennis ===
- Patrick Wheatley (1899–1967), tennis player who competed at Wimbledon on eleven separate occasions, 1921–1933, at the Olympic Games, 1924, and in the Davis Cup, 1926
