= George Robinson =

George Robinson may refer to:

== Politics and government ==
- George Robinson (1687–1728), British Member of Parliament for Tregony
- Sir George Robinson, 5th Baronet (1730–1815) of Cranford, British landowner and politician
- George Robinson (Pittsburgh) (fl. 1794-c. 1800), first Chief Burgess of the borough of Pittsburgh
- Sir George Robinson, 1st Baronet (1758–1832) of Batts House, Somerset, British MP and Chairman of the East India Company
- Sir George Robinson, 6th Baronet (1766–1833) of Cranford, British landowner and Member of Parliament
- Sir George Robinson, 2nd Baronet (1797–1855) of Batts House, Somerset, Chief Superintendent of British Trade in China
- George Richard Robinson (1781–1850), British Member of Parliament for Worcester and Poole, elected in 1826 and 1835
- George Robinson, 1st Marquess of Ripon (1827–1909), British Liberal politician
- George M. Robinson, Free Soil Party member of the Wisconsin State Assembly in 1850
- George D. Robinson (1834–1896), Governor of Massachusetts
- George Robinson (Northern Ireland politician) (born 1941), Democratic Unionist Party politician
- George S. Robinson (born 1945), North Carolina legislator
- George A. Robinson (1851–1908), Canadian-American physician and politician

== Sports ==
- George Robinson (cricketer, born 1861) (1861–1944), played first-class cricket for Oxford University
- George Robinson (cricketer, born 1873) (1873–1930), English cricketer
- George Robinson (footballer, born 1878) (1878–1945), footballer for Nottingham Forest F.C. and Bradford City A.F.C.
- George Robinson (Australian footballer) (1901–1962), Australian rules footballer
- George Robinson (footballer, born 1908) (1908–1963), English footballer for Sunderland
- George Robinson (cricketer, born 1908) (1908–1967), English cricketer
- George Robinson (Australian cricketer) (1921–1999), Australian cricketer and doctor
- George Robinson (New Zealand footballer) (fl. 1947), New Zealand international footballer
- George Robinson (cricketer, born 1949), English cricketer
- George Robinson (American football) (born 1986), offensive lineman for the Oklahoma Sooners
- George Robinson (rugby league), Australian rugby league player

== Entertainment ==
- George Wade Robinson (1838–1877), poet and hymnist from Cork, Ireland
- George O. Robinson (fl. 1860), composer of "The Palmetto State Song"
- George Robinson (cinematographer) (1890–1958), Hollywood cinematographer
- George Robinson (actor) (born 1997), British actor

== Other people ==
- George Robinson (swindler), English stockbroker and swindler in the 1720s and early 1730s
- George Robinson (bookseller) (1736–1801). English bookseller and publisher
- George Robinson (publisher) (1820–1888) English-born newspaper publisher, The Huntsville Item
- George Augustus Robinson (1791–1866), builder and preacher in Australia
- George W. Robinson (1814–1878), leader during the early history of the Latter Day Saint movement
- George Thomas Robinson (1827–1897), English architect
- George F. Robinson (1832–1907), U.S. Army soldier who save Sec. of State Seward from assassination
- George Livingston Robinson (1863–1958), author, biblical scholar, explorer, and lecturer
- George Drummond Robinson (1864–1950), British physician
- George T.O. Robinson (1922–2006), founding member of the Krio Descendants Union
- George Willard Robinson (born 1946), museum curator for whom georgerobinsonite is named
- George William Robinson (1815–1895), British entrepreneur in the Portuguese cork sector
- George Robinson (hedge fund manager) (born 1956), hedge fund manager and benefactor of Keble College, Oxford
- George Robinson, a 62-year-old black man killed on January 13, 2019, by police in Jackson, Mississippi
