= Francis Palmer =

Francis or Frances Palmer may refer to:

- Francis W. Palmer (1827–1907), politician and publisher from New York, Iowa and Illinois
- Francis Noel Palmer (1887–1961), British politician
- Francis Palmer (rugby union) (1877–1951), rugby union player who represented England
- Francis Palmer of Francis F. Palmer House
- Francis Palmer (priest) from Ridley Hall, Cambridge
- Frances Palmer (artist), American ceramicist
- Frances "Fanny" Palmer, English artist

== See also ==
- Francis Palmer Smith (1886–1971), architect active in Atlanta
- Francis Palmer Selleck (1895–1976), Australian businessman and politician
- Frank Palmer (disambiguation)
