= John Joyce =

John Joyce or Johnny Joyce may refer to:

- John Joyce (New Zealand politician) (1839–1899), New Zealand Member of Parliament (MP)
- John Joyce (American politician) (born 1957), United States Representative
- John Joye or Joyce, MP
- Jack Joyce (horse trainer) (John Edward Joyce, 1876–1934), American horseman & performer
- John Joyce (footballer) (1877–1956), English footballer
- John Joe Joyce (born 1987), Irish boxer
- Johnny Joyce (Gaelic footballer) (1937–2019), Irish Gaelic footballer
- John Stanislaus Joyce (1849–1931), father of James Joyce
- John Joyce (cricketer) (1868–1938), English cricketer
- Johnny Joyce (athlete) (1878–1957), American track and field athlete
- John A. Joyce (1842–1915), American military officer, poet and writer
- John T. Joyce (1894–1930), American businessman and politician

== See also ==
- John Joyce Russell (1897–1993), American prelate
- John Joyce Gilligan (1921–2013), American politician
- Robert John Hayman-Joyce, British soldier, see Robert Hayman-Joyce
