= Joan Dillas-Wright =

Joan Dillas-Wright is Bermudian politician and retired health care professional who is a Senator and President of the Senate of Bermuda.

== Early life and medical career ==
Dillas-Wright grew up in Ingham Vale and was educated at West Pembroke School and later at The Berkeley Institute.

In 1961, she moved to England and begun a placement to study nursing, becoming a registered nurse in 1964. She then worked for many decades in the health sector, working in both England and Bermuda. In the 1990s, she became Director of Nursing of St Brendan's Hospital in Bermuda, and by the time of her retirement in 2006, had been the CEO of the Bermuda Hospitals Board. In 2008, she was awarded an MBE "for services to healthcare in Bermuda."

== Political career ==
In 2008, Dillas-Wright was appointed to be an independent Senator in the Senate of Bermuda. In 2012, she was elected vice-president of the Senate. In 2017, she became President of the Senate, succeeding Carol Bassett.

== Personal life ==
Dillas-Wright married Roy Wright, an academic, in 1982. She is an Anglican.
