= John Le Mesurier (disambiguation) =

John Le Mesurier may refer to:

- John Le Mesurier (Alderney) (1781–1843), last hereditary governor of Alderney
- John Lemesurier (1826–1891), Canadian politician who served as mayor of Quebec City
- John Le Mesurier (British Army officer), (1834-1903)
- John Le Mesurier (1912–1983), English actor
- John Le Mesurier (b. 1933/34), English carpet salesman and alleged conspirator in the Thorpe affair

== See also ==
- John Le Masurier, British athletics coach
