= General Clark =

General Clark may refer to:

- Albert P. Clark (1913–2010), U.S. Air Force lieutenant general
- Charles Clark (governor) (1811–1877), Mississippi State Troops major general in the American Civil War
- Edward Clark (governor) (1815–1880), Confederate States Army brigadier general
- Edwin N. Clark (1902–1982), U.S. Army Reserve brigadier general
- George Clark (British Army officer) (1892–1948), British Army lieutenant general
- George Rogers Clark (1752–1818), American Revolutionary War general
- Harold L. Clark (1893–1973), U.S. Air Force brigadier general
- John Bullock Clark Jr. (1831–1903), Confederate States Army brigadier general
- John Arthur Clark (1886–1976), Canadian Expeditionary Force brigadier general
- John Bullock Clark (1802–1885), Missouri State Guard brigadier general in the American Civil War
- Lynwood E. Clark (born 1929), U.S. Air Force lieutenant general
- Mark A. Clark (general) (fl. 1980s–2010s), U.S. Marine Major General
- Mark W. Clark (1896–1984), World War II and the Korean War general
- Meriwether Lewis Clark Sr. (1809–1881), Missouri State Guard brigadier general in the American Civil War
- Richard M. Clark (born c. 1964), U.S. Air Force lieutenant general
- Robert T. Clark (fl. 1970s–2000s), U.S. Army lieutenant general
- Ronald P. Clark (fl. 1980s–2000s), U.S. Army lieutenant general
- Samuel Findlay Clark (1909–1998), Canadian Army lieutenant general
- Trudy H. Clark (born 1951), U.S. Air Force major general
- Wesley Clark (born 1944), U.S. Army general, commander in the Kosovo War, author and political spokesman
- William Leon Clark (1911–2005), U.S. Air Force brigadier general
- William Thomas Clark (1831–1905), Union Army brigadier general and brevet major general

== See also ==
- Henri Jacques Guillaume Clarke (1765–1818), Marshal of France
- James C. Clarke (1823–1902), brigadier general of Maryland National Guard
- Arthur Stanley-Clarke (1886–1983), British Army brigadier general
- Henry Calvert Stanley-Clarke (1872–1943), British Army brigadier general
- General Clarke (disambiguation)
- Attorney General Clark (disambiguation)
