= List of people from Bedford, England =

This is a list of notable people from Bedford, in Bedfordshire, England. People on this list may have been born in Bedford, attended school there, or resided in Bedford. For people whose primary association to Bedford is an education from the Bedford School, see the list of people educated at Bedford School. For people whose primary association to Bedford is an education from Bedford Modern School, see the List of Old Bedford Modernians.

== Academics ==
- C. E. M. Hansel (1917–2011), emeritus professor of Experimental Psychology
- Hubert Horace Lamb (1913–1997), English climatologist
- Dame Bertha Phillpotts, Scandinavian scholar and pioneer of university education for women
- Stephen Shalet, endocrinologist

== Athletes ==
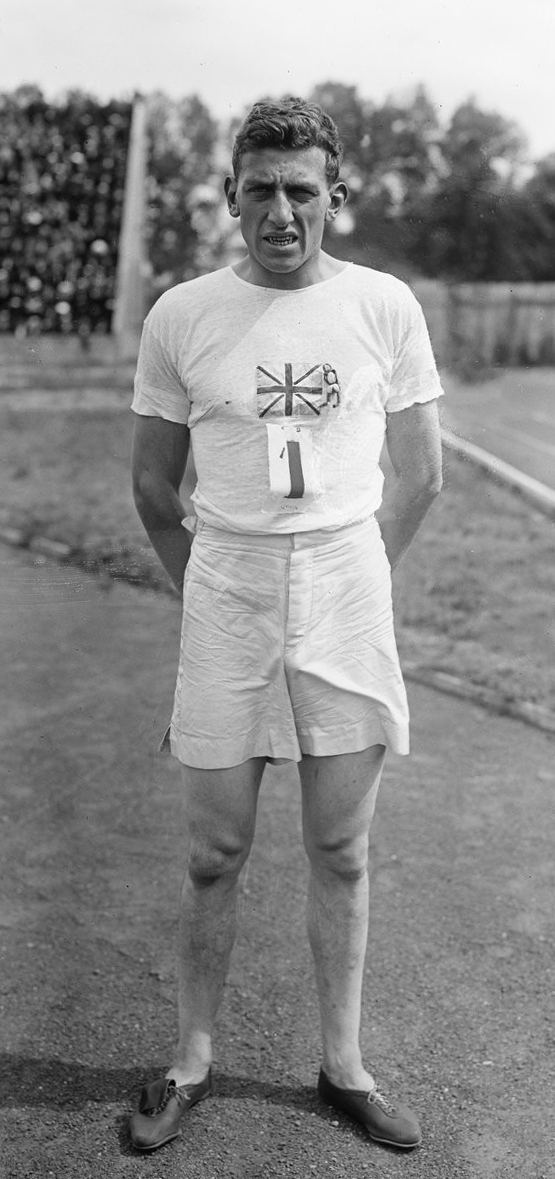
Harold Abrams

- Harold Abrahams, 1924 Olympic 100 metres champion and character in the film Chariots of Fire
- Sam Baldock, Reading footballer
- Martin Bayfield, rugby player
- Peter Bichener, cricketer
- Joe Bugner, heavyweight boxer
- Calum Davenport, ex-West Ham United footballer
- Kelvin Davis, Southampton F.C. footballer
- Eddie "The Eagle" Edwards, ski jumper
- Gail Emms, badminton doubles 2004 Olympic silver medallist
- Tim Foster, men's Olympic gold medallist in rowing
- Barry Fry, former manager of Peterborough United F.C.
- Lil Fuccillo, former footballer and manager, technical director for Luton Town F.C.
- Phelan Hill, men's eight rowing Olympic bronze medalist
- Andy Johnson, England and Queens Park Rangers F.C. footballer
- Lance Painter, MLB player with the Colorado Rockies, St. Louis Cardinals, Toronto Blue Jays, and the Milwaukee Brewers
- Arthur Poole, cricketer
- Paula Radcliffe, the UK's top female long-distance runner and world record holder for the women's marathon since 2002
- Basil Rogers (1896–1975), cricketer
- Matt Skelton, heavyweight boxer
- Etienne Stott, canoe slalom 2012 Olympic gold medalist
- Nick Tandy, racing driver, winner of the 2015 24 Hours of Le Mans
- Greg Taylor, professional footballer playing for Cambridge United
- Tim Thomas, kickboxer
- Ian Thompson, runner
- Ethan Vernon, road and track cyclist

== Businesspeople ==
- Steve Mattin, automobile designer
- Charles Wells, founder of Charles Wells Brewery Ltd

== Entertainers ==
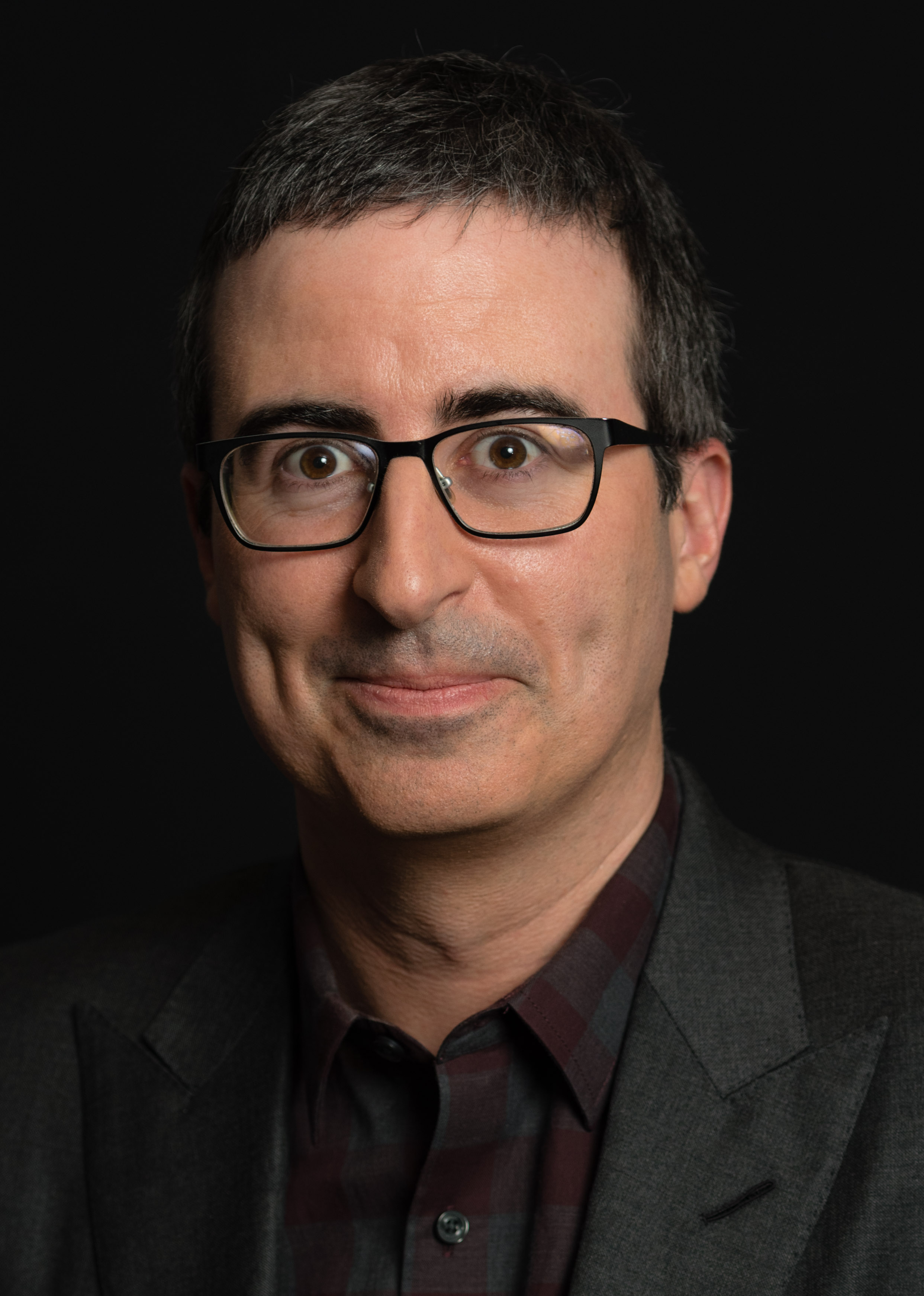
John Oliver

- Ronnie Barker, comedian
- Howard Bentham, broadcaster
- Matt Berry, actor, musician/singer/songwriter, and comedian; star of Channel 4's The IT Crowd and Toast of London, BBC Two's Toast of Tinseltown, and FX's What We Do In the Shadows
- Jacqueline Boatswain, actress
- Don Broco, alternative rock band formed in Bedford in 2008
- Adiescar Chase, multi-instrumentalist and composer
- Garry Cobain, one half of the electronic music pioneers, The Future Sound of London
- Tom Grennan, singer
- John Le Mesurier, actor and comedian
- Ian Midlane, actor
- Rachel Nicholls, soprano in opera and concert
- John Oliver, comedian, host of HBO's Last Week Tonight
- Carolyn Sampson, soprano
- Alfie Templeman, singer-songwriter
- Carol Vorderman, television personality, co-host of Channel 4 game show Countdown
- Esme Young, fashion designer and judge of the BBC reality show The Great British Sewing Bee

== Politicians ==
- William Robert Bousfield, lawyer, politician and scientist
- Frank Branston, first directly elected mayor of Bedford and former owner of the Bedfordshire on Sunday newspaper
- William Fitzhugh, also known as William the Immigrant, American politician
- Richard Fuller, member of Parliament for Bedford and Kempston 2010–2017
- Patrick Hall, member of Parliament for Bedford and Kempston 1997–2010
- Sir William Harpur, lord mayor of London in 1561
- Dave Hodgson, former directly elected mayor of Bedford
- Alfred Mitchell-Innes, diplomat, served on Bedford Town Council for 23 years
- Mohammad Yasin, current member of Parliament for Bedford and Kempston

== Writers ==
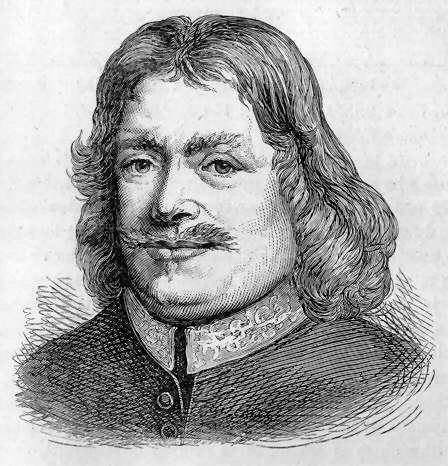
John Bunyan

- John Akass, Fleet Street journalist
- Charlotte Eliza Bousfield, diarist
- John Bunyan, Puritan preacher and author of The Pilgrim's Progress
- Norah Burke, novelist and non-fiction writer
- Edward Grierson, barrister and crime writer
- Trevor Huddleston, Anglican bishop and anti-apartheid activist
- Toby Litt, writer, went to Bedford Modern School and lived in nearby Ampthill
- Jonathan Stroud, fantasy novelist
- Laura Wade, playwright
- William Hale White, minor Victorian novelist who wrote under the pseudonym Mark Rutherford

== Other notables ==
- Apsley Cherry-Garrard, Antarctic explorer
- Rosabella Paulina Fynes Clinton (1853–1918), nurse, masseuse (physiotherapist) and midwife, and nursing and midwifery reformer
- Julian Hector (1958– ), former head of BBC Natural History Unit, British Antarctic Survey Falklands War veteran, attended Bedford Modern School
- John Howard, prison reformer and philanthropist
- Robert Anderson Jardine, priest, buried at Foster Hill Road Cemetery
- Charles Edward Mallows, architect of the Arts and Crafts movement
- Phoebe Prince (1994–2010), teenager who became a cause célèbre after bullying drove her to suicide
- Mackay Hugh Baillie Scott, architect of the Arts and Crafts movement
- Gerda Sutton (1923–2005), painter
- Captain Tom (1920–2021), World War II veteran and fund-raiser

== See also ==
- List of people educated at Bedford School
- List of Old Bedford Modernians
