= Admiral Woodhouse =

Admiral Woodhouse may refer to:

- Charles Woodhouse (1893–1978), British Royal Navy admiral
- Hector Mackenzie Woodhouse (1889–1971), British Royal Navy rear admiral
- William Woodhouse (naval officer) (by 1517–1564), English Navy lieutenant admiral
