= John Joyce (cricketer) =

English cricketer

Personal information
- Full name: John Hall Joyce
- Born: 5 December 1868; Blackfordby, Leicestershire, England
- Died: 17 April 1938 (aged 69); Vence, France
- Batting: Right-handed
- Bowling: Right-arm fast-medium
- Relatives: Francis Joyce (brother); Ralph Joyce (brother)

Domestic team information
- Years: Team
- 1894: Leicestershire

Career statistics
| Competition | First-class |
|---|---|
| Matches | 1 |
| Runs scored | 18 |
| Batting average | 18.00 |
| 100s/50s | 0/0 |
| Top score | 18 |
| Balls bowled | 70 |
| Wickets | 2 |
| Bowling average | 23.50 |
| 5 wickets in innings | 0 |
| 10 wickets in match | 0 |
| Best bowling | 2/33 |
| Catches/stumpings | 2/– |
- Source: Cricinfo, 14 January 2012

John Hall Joyce (5 December 1868 – 17 April 1938) was an English cricketer. He was born in Blackfordby, Leicestershire, and was a right-handed batsman and a right-arm fast-medium bowler.

Joyce made a single first-class appearance for Leicestershire against the Marylebone Cricket Club at Lord's in 1894. In that match, the Marylebone Cricket Club scored 124 in their first innings, during which Joyce bowled 6 wicketless overs and took 2 catches. Leicestershire responded with 286 in their first innings, and Joyce contributed 18 runs before being dismissed by Jack Mee. In the Marylebone Cricket Club's second innings of 254, he took the wickets of Frederic Geeson and Francis Ramsay, ending with figures of 2/33 from 8 overs. Leicestershire successfully chased down their target of 93 with 8 wickets remaining, which meant Joyce didn't have to bat again. This marked his sole major appearance for Leicestershire.

He died at Vence in France on 17 April 1938. His brothers, Francis and Ralph, both played first-class cricket.
