= Frank Palmer =

Frank Palmer may refer to:

- Frank Palmer (rugby union) (1896–1925), Welsh rugby union player
- Frank R. Palmer (1922–2019), British linguist, linguistic researcher and lecturer
- Frank Palmer (musician) on California
- Frank Palmer (Australian footballer) (1925–1970), Australian rules footballer for South Melbourne
- Frank Palmer (businessman) (born 1940), Canadian advertising executive

== See also ==
- Francis Palmer (disambiguation)
- Frank A. Palmer and Louise B. Crary (shipwreck), an 1897 historic dual shipwreck site
- Frank Palmer Speare (1869–1954), first president of Northeastern University
