= Peter Corbett =

Peter Corbett may refer to:

- Peter Corbett (cricketer) (1940–2015)
- Peter Edgar Corbett (1920–1992), art historian
- Peter Corbett (Big Brother)
- Peter Corbett (actor) in Always Greener
