= General Stanley =

General Stanley may refer to:

- Clifford L. Stanley (born 1947), U.S. Marine Corps major general
- David S. Stanley (1828–1902), Union Army major general

== See also ==
- Arthur Stanley-Clarke (1886–1983), British Army brigadier general
- Henry Calvert Stanley-Clarke (1872–1943), British Army brigadier general
- Attorney General Stanley (disambiguation)
