= General Russell =

General Russell may refer to:

- Lord Alexander Russell (1821–1907), British Army general
- Andrew Hamilton Russell (1868–1960), New Zealand Military Forces major general
- Baker Russell (1837–1911), British Army general
- David Russell (British Army officer) (1809–1884), British Army general
- David Allen Russell (1820–1864), U.S. Army brigadier general and brevet major general
- Dudley Russell (1896–1978), British Indian Army lieutenant general
- Lord George Russell (1790–1846), British Army major general
- Henry S. Russell (1838–1905), Massachusetts Colored Volunteer Cavalry brevet brigadier general
- John H. Russell Jr. (1872–1947), U.S. Marine Corps major general
- William Russell (Virginia politician) (1735–1793), 5th Virginia Regiment brigadier general in the American Revolutionary War
- William Carmichael Russell (1824–1905), British Indian Army major general

== See also ==
- Attorney General Russell (disambiguation)
