= Senate of Bermuda =

Upper house of the Parliament of Bermuda

- 11th Modern Bermudian Parliament

Type
- Type: Upper house of the Parliament of Bermuda

History
- Founded: 1 August 1620 (original unicameral house) 2 June 1968 (modern bicameral Parliament)

Leadership
- Monarch: Charles III
- Governor: Rena Lalgie since December 2020
- President: Joan Dillas-Wright since 2017

Structure
- Seats: 11 Senators
- House political groups: His Majesty's Government: Progressive Labour Party (5); His Majesty's Loyal Opposition: One Bermuda Alliance (3); Appointed by Governor (3)

Meeting place
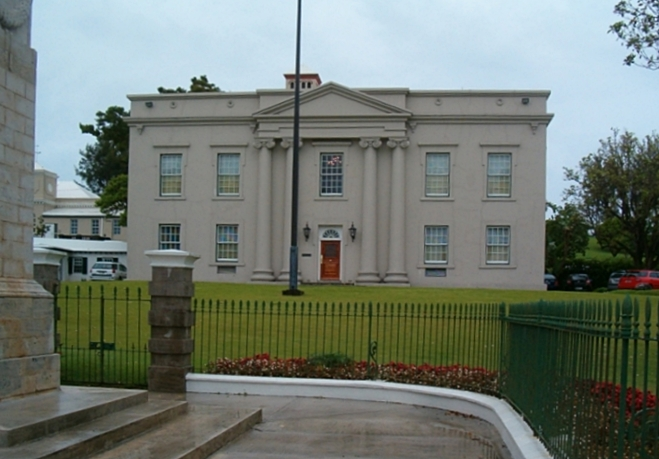
- The building housing the Senate and the Cabinet Offices.

The Senate of Bermuda is the upper house of the bicameral Parliament of Bermuda. The Senate consists of eleven members appointed by the governor for five-year terms—five senators are recommended by the premier, three by the leader of the opposition, and three are appointed at the discretion of the governor. Of the three appointed by the governor, the Senate elects one to serve as the president, and another to serve as the vice-president.

The Senate is a house of review and can be a road-block to constitutional change—the constitution requires a 2/3 super-majority, eight votes, for a constitutional amendment.

The presiding officer of the Senate is the President of the Senate. The current President, Joan Dillas-Wright, was appointed to the Senate in 2008 and previously was CEO of the Bermuda Hospitals Board.

Carol Bassett was the first woman president of the Senate in 2008. She resigned the office in August 2017.

== Current members ==
As of 21 August 2025 :

Independents (3)

- Joan Dillas-Wright
- John Wight
- Tawana Tannock

Government/Progressive Labour Party:

- The Hon. Kim Wilkerson
- Mischa Fubler
- Crystal Caeser
- Lindsay Simmons
- Lauren Bell

Opposition/One Bermuda Alliance:

- Marcus Jones
- Victoria Cunningham
- Maurice Foley

== Former members ==
- Neletha Butterfield

== History ==
Bermuda's Parliament was created in 1620 and originally had one house, the House of Assembly. Political parties were not legal, and the role now performed by the Senate was originally performed by an appointed council, called the Governor's Council, or Privy Council. The council also performed the role that today belongs to the Cabinet (the Cabinet is composed of ministers appointed from elected members of Parliament from the House of Assembly). Historically, the Council, composed of members of Bermuda's wealthy merchant class, had been the true centre of power, rather than the elected House of Assembly, or the governor despatched from overseas. During periods when the colony was without a governor, the president of the Council would be acting governor. The balance of power began to shift away from the Council in the 19th century, when Bermuda assumed a new importance in imperial security, and when the governor became also the commander-in-chief of the naval establishment and military garrison.

In May 1888, the Privy Council was split into an Executive Council, which later became the Cabinet, and a Legislative Council, which became the upper house of Parliament (equivalent to the House of Lords in the Westminster Parliament), both with senior military and civil servants as members, and also with members appointed by the governor from the House of Assembly. On the split, the president of the old Council, the chief justice of Bermuda (Sir Josiah Rees), became the president of the Legislative Council.

In 1968, largely as a result of the civil rights movement, a new constitution was introduced which made a number of changes to Bermuda's parliamentary system, making it more like the Westminster system. Political parties were legalised, and the system of a responsible government, from which a premier was appointed and the cabinet ministers were drawn, and a minority opposition was adopted. The property qualification was abolished and the system of suffrage, by which the members of the lower house were elected, and which had historically been limited to male landowners, was finally extended to all adults. The Executive Council was renamed the Cabinet in 1973, and is now formed from members of the majority party in the House of Assembly. The Legislative Council was renamed the Senate of Bermuda in 1980, and is now composed of five members recommended by the premier, three by the leader of the opposition, and three by the governor acting in his own discretion, all appointed by the governor.

== See also ==
- List of presidents of the Senate of Bermuda
