= General Clarke (disambiguation) =

General Clarke may refer to:

- Alured Clarke (1744–1832), British Army general
- Andrew Clarke (British Army officer, born 1824) (1824–1902), British Army lieutenant general
- Bruce C. Clarke (1901–1988), U.S. Army four-star general
- Carter W. Clarke (1896–1987), U.S. Army brigadier general
- Sir Charles Clarke, 3rd Baronet (1839–1932), British Army general
- Frederick J. Clarke (1915–2002), U.S. Army lieutenant general
- George Calvert Clarke (1814–1900), British Army general
- Goland Clarke (1875–1944), British Army brigadier general
- Henri Jacques Guillaume Clarke (1765–1818), Marshal of France
- Mary E. Clarke (1924–2011), U.S. Army major general
- Richard D. Clarke (born 1960), U.S. Army four-star general
- Somerset M. Wiseman Clarke (1830–1905), British Army lieutenant general
- Stanley E. Clarke III (fl. 1980s–2010s), U.S. Air Force lieutenant general
- Thomas Clarke (British Army officer) (died 1799), British Army general
- Travers Clarke (1871–1962), British Army lieutenant general
- Willoughby Clarke (1833–1909), British Indian Army major general

== See also ==
- General Clark (disambiguation)
- Attorney General Clarke (disambiguation)
