= John Joy =

John Joy may refer to:

- John Joye, English politician
- John Cantiloe Joy (1805–1859), English marine painter
