= General Dixon =

General Dixon may refer to:

- Bernard Cooke Dixon (1896–1973), British Army major general
- Matthew Dixon (British Army officer) (1821–1905), British Army major general
- Robert J. Dixon (1920–2003), U.S. Air Force four-star general

== See also ==
- General Dickson (disambiguation)
