= William Branson =

William Branson may refer to:

- William Henry Branson (1887–1961), American minister
- William Hoban Branson (1938–2006), American economist
- William Branson (physician) (1874–1950), British physician and author
