= List of presidents of the Senate of Bermuda =

List of presidents of the Legislative Council of Bermuda

Name	Entered office	Left office
Sir Josiah Rees, Kt	1888	1899
Sir Samuel Brownlow Gray, Kt, CMG	1900	1904
H. C. Gollan	1904	1911
P. M. C. Sheriff	1912	1917
Sir C. Rees-Davies, Kt	1917	1923
Sir K. J. Beatty, Kt	1924	1927
Sir S. O. Rowan Hamilton, Kt	1927	1939
R. C. Hollis Hallett	1939	1941
Sir C. G. Brooke Francis, Kt	1941	1952
Sir Joseph Trounsell Gilbert, Kt, CBE	1952	1958
Sir Newnham A. Worley, Kt, KBE	1958	1960
Sir Allen C. Smith, Kt	1960	1961
Sir Myles John Abbott, Kt	1961	1968

List of presidents of the Senate of Bermuda

Name	Entered office	Left office
Senator Sir George Ratteray, Kt, CBE	1969	1980
Senator Hugh A. Richardson, CBE, JP	1980	1987
Senator Albert Jackson, CBE, JP	1987	1998
Senator Alfred T. Oughton	1998	2008
Senator Carol Bassett	2008	2017
Senator Joan Dillas-Wright	2017	Present
