= Attorney General Stanley =

Attorney General Stanley may refer to:

- John Stanley (Hastings MP) (1740–1799), Attorney General of the Leeward Islands
- Richard H. Stanley (1823–1875), Attorney General of the Kingdom of Hawaii

== See also ==
- Edward Stanly (1810–1872), Attorney General of North Carolina
- General Stanley (disambiguation)
