= Attorney General Clark =

Attorney General Clark may refer to:

- Andrew Inglis Clark (1848–1907), Attorney-General of Tasmania
- James Paul Clarke (1854–1916), Attorney General of Arkansas
- Lewis W. Clark (1828–1900), Attorney General of New Hampshire
- Lincoln Clark (1800–1886), Attorney General of Alabama
- Tom C. Clark (1899–1977), Attorney General of the United States
- Ramsey Clark (1927–2021), Attorney General of the United States
- Robert Clark (Australian politician) (born 1957), Attorney-General of Victoria
- S. Wesley Clark (1872–1949), Attorney General of South Dakota
- Steve Clark (Arkansas politician) (born 1947), Attorney General of Arkansas
- Tom C. Clark (1899–1977), Attorney General of the United States
- William G. Clark (1924–2001), Attorney General of Illinois

== See also ==
- Attorney General Clarke (disambiguation)
- General Clark (disambiguation)
