= Attorney General Russell =

Attorney General Russell may refer to:

- Charles Russell, Baron Russell of Killowen (1832–1900), Attorney General for England and Wales
- Leslie W. Russell (1840–1903), Attorney General of New York

== See also ==
- General Russell (disambiguation)
