= Nicolas Coldstream =

English archaeologist and academic

Nicolas Coldstream FBA FSA

Academic background
- Education: King's College, Cambridge

Academic work
- Discipline: Archaeology
- Sub-discipline: Classical archaeology; Ancient Greece; Geometric Period; Ancient Greek pottery
- Institutions: Shrewsbury School; British Museum; British School at Athens; Bedford College, University of London; University College London

John Nicolas Coldstream, FBA, FSA, (30 March 1927 – 21 March 2008) was an English archaeologist and academic specialising in the Ancient Greek pottery of the Geometric Period. He lectured at Bedford College, rising to become Professor of Aegean Archaeology, and then lectured at University College London as Yates Professor of Classical Art and Archaeology. His best known excavation sites are Kythera and Knossos.

== Early life ==
Coldstream was born on 30 March 1927 in Lahore, British Raj. Sir John Coldstream, his father, was serving in the British colony as a High Court Judge. He was educated at the preparatory school St Cyprian's School, Eastbourne and the all-boys public school Eton College, Eton, Berkshire.

Following school, he undertook national service in the British Army. On 26 January 1946, he was commissioned into The Buffs as a second lieutenant. He was given the service number 362272. He saw active service in Egypt and Palestine. He then read classics at King's College, Cambridge, University of Cambridge. He graduated with a double first Bachelor of Arts (BA) degree in 1951.

== Academic career ==
Coldstream taught classics at Shrewsbury School, a public school in Shrewsbury, Shropshire from 1952 to 1956. While there, he was also an officer of the Combined Cadet Force. He transferred his commission into the school's contingent on 29 April 1954. He resigned his commission on 28 December 1956. He then worked for one year as a temporary assistant keeper at the department of Greek and Roman Antiquities, British Museum. From 1957 to 1960, he undertook research at the British School at Athens. In 1958, he published his first monograph; An Etruscan Neck-Amphora.

In 1960, he became a lecturer at Bedford College, University of London. Greek Geometric Pottery was published in 1968, and has been described as his magnum opus. In 1966, he was promoted to Reader. He was given a personal chair as Professor of Aegean Archaeology in 1975. He published Geometric Greece in 1977. In 1983, he moved to University College London and became Yates Professor of Classical Art and Archaeology. He retired in 1992, becoming professor emeritus.

In addition to his university work, he was involved in the running of the British School at Athens. He was the editor of The Annual of the British School at Athens from 1968 to 1973. He was a member and then chairman, from 1987 to 1991, of its managing committee. He was, at his death, vice-president of the School.

== Personal life ==
He was a cousin of William Coldstream, a painter.

He married his wife Nicola, a leading scholar of medieval architecture and art, in 1970.

== Honours ==
Coldstream was elected a Fellow of the Society of Antiquaries of London (FSA) in 1964, and a Fellow of the British Academy (FBA) in 1977. He was awarded the British Academy's Kenyon Medal for Classical Studies in 2003.

In his obituary, The Times called Coldstream "one of the world's leading Classical archaeologists".

== Selected works ==
- Greek Geometric Pottery: a Survey of Ten Local Styles and their Chronology (1968). London: Methuen. 2nd ed. with supplement: Bristol: Phoenix Press, 2008, ISBN 1904675816
- Kythera: Excavations and Studies Conducted by the University of Pennsylvania Museum and the British School at Athens, Park Ridge, NJ: Noyes Press (1973)
- Geometric Greece (1977, revised edition 2003), London: E. Benn
- Knossos Pottery Handbook: Greek and Roman (2001). London: British School at Athens.

== Necrology ==
1. Etruscan News v. 10 (spring 2008)
