= John Wilkes (archaeologist) =

British archaeologist and academic (born 1936)

Professor John Wilkes FSA FBA
- Born: John Joseph Wilkes; 12 July 1936 (age 90); Reigate, Surrey, England
- Occupation: Academic
- Title: Yates Professor of Classical Art and Archaeology (1992–2001)
- Awards: Fellow of the Society of Antiquaries of London (1969); Fellow of the British Academy (1986)

Academic background
- Education: University College London; Durham University

Academic work
- Discipline: Classical archaeology Ancient history
- Sub-discipline: Ancient Rome

John Joseph Wilkes, FSA, FBA (born 12 July 1936) is a British archaeologist and academic. He is Emeritus Yates Professor of Greek and Roman Archaeology at University College London.

== Early life and education ==
Wilkes was born on 12 July 1936 in Reigate, Surrey, England. He was educated at King Henry VIII School, Coventry, then an all-boys private school in Coventry, and at Harrow County School for Boys, an all-boys state grammar school in Harrow, London. He studied Ancient History and Archaeology at University College London, graduating with a Bachelor of Arts (BA) degree. He went on to study at St Cuthbert's Society, Durham University, from which he received his Doctor of Philosophy (PhD) degree.

== Academic career ==
From 1961 to 1963, Wilkes was a research fellow at the University of Birmingham. He moved to the University of Manchester where he was an assistant lecturer in history and archaeology from 1963 to 1964. He then returned the University of Birmingham as Lecturer in Roman History and Archaeology. He was promoted to senior lecturer in 1971.

In 1974, he returned to University College London where he had studied for his undergraduate degree. He joined the Institute of Archaeology as Professor of the Archaeology of the Roman Provinces. In 1992, he was appointed Yates Professor of Greek and Roman Archaeology. He retired from the university in 2001. He is currently Emeritus Yates Professor of Greek and Roman Archaeology at the university.

In addition to his university lecturing and research, he has held a number of external positions. He was Chairman of the Faculty of Archaeology, History and Letters at the British School at Rome between 1979 and 1983. He was editor of the academic journal Britannia from 1980 to 1984. From 1982 to 1985, he served as president of the London and Middlesex Archaeological Society.

== Family ==
Wilkes married Susan Walker in 1980.

== Honours ==
Wilkes was elected Fellow of the Society of Antiquaries of London (FSA) on 9 January 1969. He was elected Fellow of the British Academy (FBA) in 1986. He is an Honorary Vice-President of the Society for the Promotion of Roman Studies, and Honorary President of the Association for Roman Archaeology.

== Selected works ==
- Wilkes, John J. (1969), Dalmatia, London: Routledge and Kegan Paul
- Frere, S. S.; Wilkes, J. J. (1989). Strageath: excavations within the Roman fort 1973-86. London: Society for the Promotion of Roman Studies. ISBN 978-0907764113.
- Wilkens, J. J. (1993). Diocletian's Palace, Split: residence of a retired Roman emperor. Sheffield: University of Sheffield. ISBN 978-0952107309.
- Wilkes, John J. (1995), The Illyrians, Oxford, United Kingdom: Blackwell Publishers Limited, ISBN 0-631-19807-5
