= Attorney General Clarke =

Attorney General Clarke may refer to:

- Cecil Clarke (born 1968), Attorney General of Nova Scotia
- Ellis Clarke (1917–2010), Attorney General of Trinidad and Tobago
- Fielding Clarke (1851–1928), Attorney General of Fiji

== See also ==
- Attorney General Clark (disambiguation)
- General Clarke (disambiguation)
