= General Dickson =

General Dickson may refer to:

- Alexander Dickson (British Army officer) (1777–1840), British Army major general
- Collingwood Dickson (1817–1904), British Army general
- David C. Dickson (Mississippi politician) (died 1836), Mississippi Militia brigadier general
- Edward Thompson Dickson (1850–1938), British Army major general
- Jeremiah Dickson (c. 1775–1848), British Army major general
- Tracy Campbell Dickson (1868–1936), U.S. Army brigadier general

== See also ==
- General Dixon (disambiguation)
