= Bobby Jones (rugby union) =

Wales rugby union player

- Born: Robert Edward Jones; 15 October 1900 Shanghai
- Died: 13 February 1970 (aged 69) Chessington
- School: Bedford School

Rugby union career
International career
Years	Team	Apps	(Points)
1926-1926	Wales	3	(0)

Robert Edward Jones (1900–1970) was a rugby union international who represented Wales in 1926.

== Early life ==
Bobby Jones was born on 15 October 1900 in Shanghai, China and educated at Bedford School. He played for Wales in three matches in 1926. He died in February 1970.
