= William Branson (physician) =

British physician and author

- Born: 17 September 1874; Calcutta, India
- Died: 5 March 1950 (aged 75); Bury St Edmunds, England
- Scientific career
- Fields: Medicine
- Workplaces: Royal Free Hospital, St Andrew's Hospital, Dollis Hill

William Philip Sutcliffe Branson CBE FRCP (17 September 1874–5 March 1950) was a senior British physician and author.

== Biography ==
Born on 17 September 1874 in Calcutta, India, William Branson was educated at Bedford School, at Trinity College, Cambridge, and at the Medical College of St Bartholomew's Hospital. He was Consultant Physician at the Royal Free Hospital and at St Andrew's Hospital, Dollis Hill. During the First World War he joined the Duchess of Westminster's Hospital at Le Touquet and, in 1916, was made Consultant Physician to the Fifth Army, British Expeditionary Force, with Colonel's rank. He was Associate Examiner in Medicine for the University of London.

The brother of The Right Hon. Sir George Arthur Harwin Branson PC (the grandfather of Sir Richard Branson), William Branson died at Bury St Edmunds on 5 March 1950.

== Publications ==
Medical Morbid Anatomy and Pathology, 1909, Songs and Sober Pieces, 1938.
