= Robert Glunicke =

Major-General Robert Glunicke DL
- Born: 6 March 1886
- Died: 20 October 1963 (aged 77)
- Military career
- Allegiance: United Kingdom
- Branch: Royal Marines
- Service years: 1904–1941
- Rank: Major-General
- Conflicts: First World War; Second World War

Major-General Robert Charles Arthur Glunicke DL (6 March 1886 – 20 October 1963) was a senior Royal Marines officer during the Second World War.

== Military career ==
Born on 6 March 1886, Robert Glunicke was educated at Bedford School. He received his first commission, as a second lieutenant in the Royal Marines in 1904. He served during the First World War and was a member of the East African Expeditionary Force from 1916 to 1917. He served during the Second World War and was Aide-de-camp to King George VI between 1939 and 1940, and Commandant, Plymouth Division, Royal Marines, between 1939 and 1941.

Glunicke retired from the Royal Marines in 1941. He was appointed deputy lieutenant of Bedfordshire on 16 May 1953 and died on 20 October 1963.
