= Eustace Tickell =

British Army officer

Major-General Sir Eustace Tickell KBE MC
- Born: 10 December 1893
- Died: 28 December 1972 (aged 79); Surrey, England
- Military career
- Allegiance: United Kingdom
- Branch: British Army
- Service years: 1913–1948
- Rank: Major-General
- Service number: 8173
- Unit: Royal Engineers
- Conflicts: First World War; Second World War
- Awards: Knight Commander of the Order of the British Empire; Companion of the Order of the Bath; Military Cross; Mentioned in Despatches (7); Officer of the Legion of Honour (France); Croix de Guerre (France)

Major-General Sir Eustace Francis Tickell, KBE, CB, MC (10 December 1893 – 28 December 1972) was a senior British Army officer during the Second World War.

== Military career ==
Born on 10 December 1893 in Srinagar Kashmir, Eustace Tickell was educated at Bedford School and at the Royal Military Academy, Woolwich. He received his first commission in the Royal Engineers in 1913 and served in France, Greece and Palestine during the First World War, winning the Military Cross in 1915.

Tickell served as an instructor at the Royal School of Military Engineering in 1919 and, after marrying two years later, he returned to the Royal Military Academy, Woolwich, this time as an instructor, from 1924 to 1927. He then served in Northern China in 1928, before returning to the United Kingdom to become officer commanding Royal Engineers officers at the University of Cambridge from 1932 to 1934. He was then made Commander Royal Engineers (CRE) with Northern Command from 1936 to 1938, CRE of the 5th Infantry Division until 1939, and then Chief Engineer, British Troops in Egypt, a position he was holding at the beginning of the Second World War in September 1939.

During the war Tickell served in the Middle East and, in 1940, was appointed Director of Works with Middle East Command. In 1944, he was briefly made Engineer-in-Chief with Middle East Command, before being made Director of Works with the 21st Army Group, from 1944 to 1945. Engineer-in-Chief with the British Liberation Army in 1945, he returned that year to the War Office to be made Engineer-in-Chief.

Tickell was invested as a Companion of the Order of the Bath in 1942 and as a Knight Commander of the Order of the British Empire in 1945. After being made President of the Institution of Royal Engineers in 1948, a post he retained until 1951, he retired from the British Army in 1949 but the next year he was made Colonel Commandant of the Royal Engineer Corps until 1958, as well as, in 1953, becoming Honorary Colonel of the Army Emergency Reserve Royal Engineers Resource Unit, until 1959. Tickell died in Surrey on 28 December 1972, shortly after turning 79.

== Family ==
His father, Charles Tickell, was a Civil Engineer who worked for the Maharajah of Kashmir. His son was Major General Marston Tickell, also a Royal Engineer.

== Bibliography ==
- Smart, Nick (2005). Biographical Dictionary of British Generals of the Second World War. Barnesley: Pen & Sword. ISBN 1844150496.
