= Bertram Lamb Pearson =

British civil servant

- Born: 1893
- Died: 17 August 1984 (aged 90–91)
- Occupation: British civil servant

Bertram Lamb Pearson CB DSO MC (1893 – 17 August 1984) was a senior British civil servant at the Ministry of Education in the 1940s and 1950s.

He was educated at Wakefield Grammar School, at Bedford School and at The Queen's College, Oxford. He was Principal Private Secretary to the Permanent Secretary at the Board of Education between 1924 and 1928, Principal Private Secretary to the President of the Board of Education between 1937 and 1946, and Under Secretary at the Ministry of Education between 1946 and 1955.

Bertram Lamb Pearson died on 17 August 1984.
