= Clayton Boyce =

Royal Air Force officer

Clayton Descou Clement Boyce
- Born: 19 September 1907
- Died: 20 December 1987 (aged 80)
- Allegiance: United Kingdom
- Branch: Royal Air Force
- Service years: 1925–1959
- Rank: Air Vice Marshal
- Commands: AHQ Levant (1955–56); AHQ Cyprus (1954–55); RAF Binbrook (1942); No. 84 Squadron (1941–42)
- Conflicts: Second World War
- Awards: Companion of the Order of the Bath; Commander of the Order of the British Empire; Mentioned in Despatches (3)

Air Vice Marshal Clayton Descou Clement Boyce CB, CBE (19 September 1907 – 20 December 1987) was a senior Royal Air Force (RAF) officer.

== Biography ==
Boyce was born on 19 September 1907 to Marjorie St. Clair and Clement Boyce, and was educated at Bedford School and at the Royal Air Force College Cranwell. He was appointed as Secretary General of Allied Air Forces in Central Europe from 1953 to 1954, as Air Officer Commanding Cyprus and the Levant from 1954 to 1956, and as Assistant Controller of Aircraft, Ministry of Supply, from 1957 to 1959.

Boyce was made a Companion of the Order of the Bath in the 1946 New Year Honours. He retired from the RAF on 12 September 1959. He died on 20 December 1987.
