= Rory Shaw =

British physician

- Born: 5 January 1954
- Scientific career
- Fields: Medicine
- Workplaces: St Mary's Hospital Medical School, Imperial College School of Medicine

Professor Rory James Swanton Shaw FRCP (born 1954) is a senior British physician.

== Biography ==
Born on 5 January 1954, Professor Rory Shaw was educated at Bedford School and at the Medical College of St Bartholomew's Hospital. He was Senior Lecturer and Consultant Physician in Respiratory Medicine at St Mary's Hospital Medical School between 1989 and 1997, and has been Professor of Respiratory Medicine at Imperial College School of Medicine since 1997.

Professor Shaw was medical director of the Hammersmith Hospitals NHS Trust between 1998 and 2006, medical director of the Royal Berkshire NHS Foundation Trust between 2007 and 2009, and has been medical director of the North West London Hospitals NHS Trust since 2009.

In 2001, Professor Shaw was appointed as head of the National Patient Safety Agency for England and Wales, charged by the government with revolutionising patient safety in the National Health Service. In November 2013, the government appointed Professor Shaw to lead the newly established National Health Service International Development Team.
