= George Robinson (cricketer, born 1908) =

English cricketer

George William Robinson (15 February 1908 – 16 July 1967) was an English first-class cricketer active 1930–36 who played for Nottinghamshire. He was born in Kirkby-in-Ashfield; died in Derby.
