= Gerald Kellett =

British Army general

Major-General Gerald Kellett CB CBE
- Born: 24 October 1905; Plymouth, Devon
- Died: 6 July 1973 (aged 67); Ipswich, Suffolk, England
- Military career
- Allegiance: United Kingdom
- Branch: British Army
- Service years: 1925–1961
- Rank: Major-General
- Unit: Royal Artillery
- Conflicts: Second World War
- Awards: CB, CBE

Major-General Gerald Kellett CB CBE (24 October 1905 – 6 July 1973) was a senior British Army officer.

== Biography ==
Born on 24 October 1905, Gerald Kellett was educated at Bedford School and at the Royal Military Academy, Woolwich. He was commissioned as a Second Lieutenant in the Royal Artillery in 1925. He served during the Second World War and was appointed as Director of the Inspectorate of Armaments, between 1954 and 1956, and Director General of Artillery at the War Office, between 1957 and 1960.

Major General Gerald Kellett was invested as a Commander of the Order of the British Empire in 1957, and as a Companion of the Order of the Bath in 1959. He retired from the British Army in January 1961 and died on 6 July 1973.
