= St Andrew's Hospital, Dollis Hill =

St Andrew's Hospital
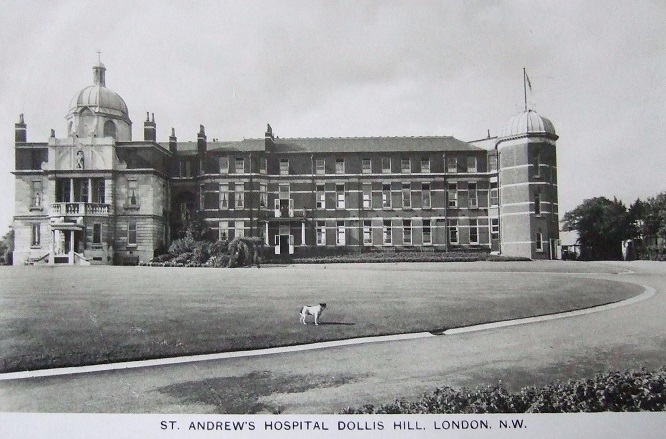
- St Andrew's Hospital

- Location within Brent

Geography
- Location: Dollis Hill, London, England, United Kingdom
- Coordinates: 51.5620°N 0.2336°W

Organisation
- Care system: Private

History
- Founded: 1913
- Closed: 1973

Links
- Lists: Hospitals in England

St. Andrew's Hospital was a general hospital situated in Dollis Hill in north west London.

== History ==
The hospital was financed through the will of a French benefactor, Marguerite Amice Piou, with the land to build it acquired for £8,500. It had 100 beds when it was opened by Sir David Burnett, Lord Mayor of London, in March 1913. The hospital was placed under the management of the Order of the Poor Servants of the Mother of God and, two years later, of the Sisters of Mercy. In 1914 it became a military hospital to treat injured Belgian soldiers. Visitors at that time included the Duke and Duchess of Vendôme as well as the Prince and Princess Victor Napoléon.

The hospital was disclaimed by the National Health Service in 1948 and remained private. It was sold to Brent Council in 1972 and was closed the following year. It has since been demolished.

The hospital had many famous patients including Lionel Logue, the speech therapist who helped King George VI overcome his pronounced stammer, Freya Stark, the celebrated explorer and travel writer, and the actress and singer Lily Elsie.
