= George William Robinson =

British entrepreneur in the cork sector in Portugal

George William Robinson was a British entrepreneur in the Portuguese cork industry.

== Arrival in Portugal ==
George William Robinson was born in 1815 in Wakefield in Yorkshire, England. His family business in nearby Halifax, called Robinson Brothers Cork Growers, imported and processed cork from Portugal. In the 1840s he travelled to Portugal to meet with cork suppliers and, after extensive travels through the cork-growing areas, arrived in Portalegre in the north of the Alentejo region. This was the site of a small cork-processing factory that had been set up by another Briton, Thomas Reynolds, in a Franciscan convent left empty after the dissolution of the monasteries in Portugal in 1834.

== Factory purchase ==
Robinson settled in Portalegre in 1848, eventually buying the small factory, which Reynolds had to sell to meet business debts incurred by his son, also called Thomas. With a ready-made factory at his disposal and a family business in England to sell to, Robinson also benefitted from rapidly rising export prices for cork products. The United Kingdom accounted for more than 50% of Portuguese sales of products such as pressed plank cork, corks for bottles, notice boards and cork buoys. By the mid-1850s he had around 260 employees, including those who stripped the bark from the trees.

== Family ==
Robinson married Sarah Anne Wheelhouse from England and they set up home in Boavista, to the south of the factory. The couple had six or seven children but only two would outlive them. George Wheelhouse Robinson, who would eventually take over the business was born on 17 September 1857. He was sent to England as a young boy to avoid the illnesses from which his siblings had died. He studied in Doncaster and did not return permanently to Portugal until he was 24. He died in 1932; his sister Mary died in 1918.

== Business expansion ==
In 1868 Robinson purchased at public auction part of the land of the dissolved Convent, which had until then belonged to the Portuguese Exchequer. In the same year, the three woollen textile factories in Portalegre went bankrupt and Robinson's factory became the major employer. It purchased its first steam engine in 1872. A few years later Robinson began to purchase land for cork production in nearby Spain. In 1880 he was to inform the Portuguese Parliament that his factory employed 680 workers, of whom 420 were women.

== Religious activities ==
Robinson was an Evangelical Protestant and in 1880 he set up a church in Portalegre, buying a house with a theatre attached for that purpose. This gained a significant following in the town. He pursued altruistic activities and, in 1881, was described by the Portuguese Government's Industrial Survey of 1881 as “energetic, intelligent, from year to year he has increased the factory in size, and, through training and discipline within the framework of strict adherence to regulations governing his work force, he has raised his business to such a level of prosperity that it has become not only the main such business in the Province but has made of its proprietor one of the wealthiest owners of rural buildings in the area.”

== Death ==
George William Robinson died on 30 April 1895. In his will he specified that “the workers of the cork factory shall take three days of mourning and each one shall be paid six days’ wages besides the three days’ mourning, during which they will not go to the factory”. In 1881 Robinson had handed over management of his business to his son, who continued to diversify the family's wealth through the purchase and rental of additional land in Portugal and Spain, as well as a cork factory in San Vicente de Alcántara in Spain. The Portalegre factory suffered a damaging fire in 1898, leading the company to establish a volunteer fire service for the town. The factory purchased three Babcock & Wilcox steam boilers in the early 1900s. The business became a limited company in 1931 but remained in the hands of the family until 1946, when it passed into Portuguese ownership. The factory closed in 2009 and is now the site of a museum and of the Robinson Foundation (Fundacão Robinson), which was set up in 2005 and aims to preserve a record of the cork industry.
