= Michael Whitworth Prynne =

British Army general

Major-General Michael Whitworth Prynne CB CBE
- Born: 1 April 1912
- Died: 27 September 1977 (aged 65); Wells-next-the-Sea, Norfolk
- Military career
- Allegiance: United Kingdom
- Branch: British Army
- Rank: Major-General
- Unit: Royal Engineers
- Conflicts: Second World War
- Awards: CB, CBE

Major-General Michael Whitworth Prynne CB CBE (1912–1977) was a senior British Army officer.

== Biography ==
Born on 1 April 1912, the son of Captain Alan Lockyer Prynne and Jeanette Prynne (née Crosse), Michael Whitworth Prynne was educated at Bedford School, at St John's College, Cambridge and at the Royal Military Academy, Woolwich. He received his first commission in the Royal Engineers in 1932. On 1 June 1940 he married Jean Stewart, at the Cathedral, Gibraltar. During the Second World War he served in Iran, Iraq, North Africa and Italy. He was Military Attaché to Moscow between 1951 and 1953, was appointed as deputy director of the War Office in 1960, and was Chief of Staff, Headquarters, Southern Command, between 1964 and 1967.

Major General Michael Whitworth Prynne was invested as a Commander of the Order of the British Empire in 1962, and as a Companion of the Order of the Bath in 1966. He retired from the British Army in 1967.

Prynne's military career was complemented by his avocation as a researcher into the construction of the European lute. He wrote papers for the Lute Society Journal, the Galpin Society Journal and a booklet for the Lute Society 'A Brief History of the Lute.' His contributions in both research and instrument making based on the study of surviving instruments moved lute making away from the style of lute-shaped guitars prevalent in the mid-20th century.

He died, with his wife, in a road accident in Wells-next-the-Sea, Norfolk, on 27 September 1977.
