= George Livingston Robinson =

George Livingston Robinson (August 19, 1863 – July 18, 1958) was a noted author, biblical scholar, explorer, and lecturer.

He was born in West Hebron, New York to William Robinson and Mary (Archibald) Robinson. He earned his undergraduate and an advanced degree at Princeton University. He traveled to Europe and the Levant extensively. He met his wife, Jessie Harvey, and was married in Egypt. He received his doctorate in Ancient languages at Berlin University. He accepted instructor positions at Knox College, Toronto and the Syrian Protestant College in Beirut. While working as the Director of the School of Oriental Research in Jerusalem (1913–1914), he had an opportunity to explore many ancient sites in the Holy Land. He was credited with recognizing the religious significance of the High Place at Petra, an Iron Age sacrificial altar dating to biblical times. He was also one of a select few Western scholars to be granted permission by the Caliph to visit the Cave of Macpelah (where Abraham, Isaac, and Jacob are reputed to have been buried).

He spent the majority of his teaching career as a professor at McCormick Theological Seminary. He was fluent in Latin, German, Hebrew, Classic Greek, and Assyrian cuneiform. He composed and published the psalm "Reflections". His published books include The Sarcophagus of Ancient Civilization (MacMillan, 1930), Leaders of Israel, The Book of Isaiah, The Twelve Minor Prophets, and The Autobiography of George L Robinson, A Short History of a Long Life in addition to hundreds of essays, monographs, and research publications.

He died in Saint Paul, Minnesota on July 18, 1958.
