= Georgerobinsonite =

Hydrous chromate mineral

General
- Category: Minerals
- Formula: Pb_{4}(CrO_{4})_{2}(OH)_{2}FCl
- IMA symbol: Grb
- Crystal system: Orthorhombic
- Crystal class: Dipyramidal (mmm); H-M symbol: (2/m 2/m 2/m)
- Space group: Pmmn
- Unit cell: a = 7.6257(6) b = 11.6078(9) c = 6.8961(5) [Å]; Z = 2

Identification
- Color: Orange-red
- Cleavage: None
- Fracture: Uneven
- Mohs scale hardness: 2.5–3
- Luster: Adamantine luster
- Streak: Pale orange
- Density: 6.23 g/cm^{3} (calculated)
- Ultraviolet fluorescence: None

Georgerobinsonite, named for George Willard Robinson, is a lead chromate mineral with formula Pb_{4}(CrO_{4})_{2}(OH)_{2}FCl. It exhibits very small, transparent crystals with a bright orange-red color. It was obtained from the Mammoth–St. Anthony Mine in Arizona in the 1940s and identified in 2009.

== History ==
The type specimen for georgerobinsonite was found in the Mammoth–St. Anthony Mine in Tiger, Arizona. The sample was collected by Dan Mayers in 1943 or 1944. At this time, the mine was operating at a level where a number of exotic minerals have been discovered. The exact location of its origin is unknown, but it is likely from the Collins vein at the 500 level.

The sample, labelled M 117 by Mayers, was donated along with many others to the Department of Mineralogy at Harvard. Professor Heinrich Meixner obtained it in the 1950s in an exchange with the curator of Harvard's mineral collection, Professor C. Frondel. Werner H. Paar then acquired it in the early 1970s. Several years prior to 2011, reexamination of M 117 revealed very small crystals of an orange-red mineral. They were initially misidentified as wulfenite, but later determined to be a new mineral species.

In November 2009, the Commission on New Minerals, Nomenclature and Classification of the International Mineralogical Association (IMA) designated the mineral as IMA 2009-068. The IMA later approved georgerobinsonite as the recommended name. Georgerobinsonite is named for George Willard Robinson, A. E. Seaman Mineral Museum curator since 1996 and mineralogy professor at Michigan Technological University.

== Properties ==
Georgerobinsonite is a soft, brittle mineral that forms crystals less than 0.1 mm (0.0039 in) across. The mineral possesses a pale-orange streak and an adamantine luster. It is most strongly associated with cerussite and diaboleite.
