= William Weighell =

English cricketer

Revd William Bartholomew Weighell (21 June 1846 – 29 October 1905) was an English cricketer active from 1866 to 1878 who played for Sussex. He was born in Cheddington, Buckinghamshire, educated at Bedford School and at Jesus College, Cambridge, and died in Shilton, Oxfordshire. He appeared in 26 first-class matches as a righthanded batsman who bowled right arm fast with a roundarm action. He scored 388 runs with a highest score of 38 and took 25 wickets with a best performance of four for 23.
