= Arthur Cocks (cricketer) =

British first class cricketer and army officer

Personal information
- Full name: Arthur Denis Bradford Cocks
- Born: 29 July 1904; Dharamshala, Punjab Province, British India
- Died: 6 June 1944 (aged 39); Sword Beach, near Ouistreham, Normandy, France
- Batting: Right-handed
- Bowling: Unknown

Domestic team information
- Years: Team
- 1924: Bedfordshire

Career statistics
Competition	First-class
Matches	2
Runs scored	30
Batting average	15.00
100s/50s	–/–
Top score	26*
Balls bowled	306
Wickets	0
Bowling average	–
5 wickets in innings	–
10 wickets in match	–
Best bowling	–
Catches/stumpings	3/–
- Source: Cricinfo, 24 April 2019

Arthur Denis Bradford Cocks (29 July 1904 – 6 June 1944) was an English first-class cricketer and British Army officer. Cocks served with the Royal Engineers from 1925–1944, serving in the Second World War, in which he was killed on D-Day. He also played first-class cricket for the British Army cricket team.

== Life and military career ==
The son of George Arthur Cocks and his wife, Annie Violet Cocks, he was born in British India at Dharamshala. Cocks was educated in England at Bedford School, where he played cricket for the school team. He played minor counties cricket for Bedfordshire in 1924, making a single appearance in the Minor Counties Championship. After leaving Bedford, he decided on a career in the army and attended the Royal Military Academy, Woolwich. He graduated from Woolwich in January 1925, entering into the Royal Engineers as a second lieutenant. He was promoted to the rank of lieutenant in January 1927. In May of the same year he made his debut in first-class cricket for the British Army cricket team against Oxford University at Oxford, before making a second appearance in June against Cambridge University at Fenner's. He scored 30 runs in his two first-class appearances, while with the ball he bowled a total of 51 wicketless overs.

He married Majorie Du Caurroy Chads in 1932 and shortly after served in British Burma, where he was stationed at Rangoon. He returned to England in 1936, where he was promoted to the rank of captain in January, before being seconded to the War Office as a staff captain in December 1937. He relinquished his appointment at the war office in January 1939. He served in the Second World War with the Royal Engineers, during which he was promoted to the rank of major in January 1942, with a further promotion to the rank of lieutenant colonel. On D-Day he landed at Sword Beach with the 5th Assault Regiment, known as the 'Hobart's Funnies', in the course of which he was killed in action. His body was returned to England and buried at St. Peter's Church, Frimley.
