= Kenneth Bastyan =

British Army officer

Major-General Kenneth Bastyan CB CBE
- Born: 10 December 1906; Frimley Green, Surrey, England
- Died: 21 March 1975 (aged 68)
- Military career
- Allegiance: United Kingdom
- Branch: British Army
- Rank: Major-General
- Unit: Royal Corps of Signals
- Conflicts: Second World War; Malayan Emergency
- Awards: Order of the Bath; Order of the British Empire

Major-General Kenneth Cecil Orville Bastyan CB CBE (10 December 1906 – 21 March 1975) was a senior British Army officer.

== Biography ==
Born in Frimley Green and educated at Bedford School, Kenneth Bastyan was commissioned as a second lieutenant in the Royal Corps of Signals in 1926. During the Second World War he served in India, Iraq and Burma. He served in Malaya during the Malayan Emergency, between 1951 and 1953. He was Chief Signals Officer for Far Eastern Land Forces (British Army) between 1953 and 1954, Deputy Signal Officer-in-Chief at the War Office between 1954 and 1957, and Chief Signal Officer to the British Army of the Rhine and the Northern Army Group between 1957 and 1960.

Major General Bastyan was invested as a Companion of the Order of the Bath in 1959. He died on 21 March 1975.
