= George Robinson (New Zealand footballer) =

New Zealand footballer

Personal information
- Full name: George Robinson
- Place of birth: New Zealand

Senior career*
Years	Team	Apps	(Gls)
- North Shore United

International career
1947	New Zealand	1	(0)
- * Club domestic league appearances and goals

George Robinson is a former football (soccer) player who represented New Zealand at international level.

Robinson made a single appearance in an official international for New Zealand in a 1–4 loss to South Africa on 19 July 1947.
