= Martin Meeson =

English cricketer (1933–1995)

Personal information
- Full name: Martin Stewart Meeson
- Born: 12 July 1995; Marylebone, London, England
- Died: 12 July 1995 (aged 61); Westminster, London, England
- Batting: Left-handed

Domestic team information
- Years: Team
- 1952–1963: Bedfordshire
- 1957: Cambridge University

Career statistics
Competition	First-class
Matches	1
Runs scored	25
Batting average	12.50
100s/50s	–/–
Top score	21
Catches/stumpings	–/–
- Source: Cricinfo, 25 July 2019

Martin Stewart Meeson (6 November 1933 – 12 July 1995) was an English first-class cricketer.

Meeson was born at Marylebone in November 1933. He was educated at Bedford School, before going up to Pembroke College, Cambridge. While studying at Cambridge, he made a single appearance in first-class cricket for Cambridge University against Kent at Fenner's in 1957. Batting twice in the match, he was dismissed in the Cambridge first-innings for 21 runs by John Pretlove, while in their second-innings he was dismissed for 4 runs by Colin Page. In addition to playing first-class cricket, he also played minor counties cricket for Bedfordshire from 1952–63, albeit intermittently, making nine appearances in the Minor Counties Championship. Meeson died at Westminster in July 1995.
