= James Radclyffe McDonagh =

British surgeon (1881–1965)

James Eustace Radclyffe McDonagh
- Born: 17 October 1881; London
- Died: 14 February 1965 (aged 83); Stowmarket
- Scientific career
- Fields: Surgery
- Workplaces: London Lock Hospital

James Eustace Radclyffe McDonagh FRCS (17 October 1881 – 14 February 1965) was a British surgeon and medical writer.

== Biography ==
McDonagh was born on 17 October 1881 in London. He was educated at Bedford School and at the Medical College of St Bartholomew's Hospital. He qualified M.R.C.S and L.R.C.P. in 1906 and passed F.R.C.S. in 1909. He was a surgeon at the London Lock Hospital and a Fellow of the Royal College of Surgeons. In 1916, he was appointed Hunterian Professor at the Royal College of Surgeons. In 1929, he established the Nature of Disease Institute, remaining its director until 1959. Here he worked on the causes of syphilis, the common cold and influenza, reaching conclusions generally at odds with those commonly held. McDonagh prescribed his patients colon cleansing and a vegetarian diet. He treated Aldous Huxley.

The Nature of Disease Institute published their first report in 1948. McDonagh and his institute proposed a "unitary theory of disease" which was not accepted by the medical community. One review suggested that his theory was ill-defined, implausible and was an example of eccentric literature.

McDonagh retired in 1959 and died on 14 February 1965 in Stowmarket, Suffolk.

== Publications ==
- Textbook on Venereal Diseases, 1915 and 1920
- Venereal Diseases: Their Clinical Aspect and Treatment, 1920
- The Nature of Disease (three volumes), 1924–1927–1931
- The Nature of Disease (The British Medical Journal), 1929
- The Nature of Disease Journal (three volumes), 1932–1934
- The Common Cold and Influenza, 1936
- The Universe Through Medicine, 1940
- The Nature of Disease To Date, 1946
- The Nature of Disease Institute's First, Second and Third Annual Reports, 1948, 1949 and 1951
- The Universe in the Making, 1948
- A Further Study in the Nature of Disease, 1954
- A Final Study in the Nature of Disease, 1959
- The Nature of the Universe, Health and Disease, 1963
- Protein: The Basis of All Life, 1966.
