= Yates Professor of Classical Art and Archaeology =

The Yates Professorship of Classical Art and Archaeology is an endowed chair in classical archaeology at University College London. The chair is named in honour of James Yates (1789-1871), whose fortune was used to endow the chair in 1880.

Yates Professors of Classical Art and Archaeology:

- Charles Thomas Newton (1880-1888)
- Reginald Stuart Poole (1889–1895)
- Ernest Arthur Gardner (1896-1929)
- Bernard Ashmole (1929-1948)
- Martin Robertson (1948-1961)
- Peter Edgar Corbett (1961-1982)
- Nicolas Coldstream (1982-1992)
- John Wilkes (1992-2001)
