= William Castle Cleary =

Sir William Castle Cleary
- Born: 14 March 1886
- Died: 19 January 1971 (aged 84)
- Occupation: civil servant

Sir William Castle Cleary KBE CB (14 March 1886 – 19 January 1971) was a senior British civil servant.

== Biography ==
Born on 14 March 1886, Sir William Cleary was educated at Bedford School and at Trinity College, Cambridge. He was Principal Private Secretary to Hastings Lees-Smith, Sir Donald Maclean and Lord Halifax, as Presidents of the Board of Education, between 1931 and 1935. He was Principal Assistant Secretary for Elementary Education between 1940 and 1945, and Deputy Secretary at the Ministry of Education between 1945 and 1950.

Sir William Cleary died on 19 January 1971.
