= Frances Palmer (artist) =

American ceramicist, photographer and gardener

- Born: Morristown, New Jersey
- Education: Columbia University
- Occupations: Ceramicist, photographer

Frances Palmer is an American ceramicist, photographer, and gardener. She is known for her ceramics and her photography of flower arrangements. She works from her studio in Weston, Connecticut.

== Early life and education ==
Palmer was born in Morristown, New Jersey. She studied art history at Columbia University.

== Work ==
She started her work in ceramics by taking a class at the Silvermine Arts Center in New Canaan, Connecticut, when she was 31. She then set up a studio in her home with her goal being to have a business she could run while raising her children. She first sold her pieces at a friend's store, and later at stores such as Barneys New York and Takashimaya. She works with terra cotta, earthenware, and porcelain. Writing in New England Home, Maria LaPiana notes she is known, "for glazed white pieces that are ribbed, furled, fluted, folded and adorned with flowers, ruffles and beads."

Palmer is also a self-taught photographer, and photographs floral arrangements in the vessels she makes. The flowers she uses come from her garden, and dahlias are a favorite subject. A book of her photography, Life in the Studio: Inspiration and Lessons on Creativity, was published by Artisan Press in 2020.

Palmer cites ceramicist George Ohr and the Omega Workshops as inspirations for her pottery.
