= Joseph Trounsell Gilbert =

Sir Joseph Trounsell Gilbert CBE QC (30 August 1888 – 23 January 1975) was a Bermudan barrister, judge and politician who ended a distinguished legal and political career as Chief Justice of Bermuda and as President of the Legislative Council of Bermuda.

== Biography ==
Born on 30 August 1888, Trounsell Gilbert was educated at Bedford School and at Brasenose College, Oxford, where he was a Rhodes Scholar. He was called to the Bar in 1914 and became a member of Lincoln's Inn. He was Attorney General, and a member of the Executive Council, of Bermuda between 1938 and 1952. He was Chief Justice of Bermuda, and President of the Legislative Council of Bermuda, between 1952 and 1958.

Sir Trounsell Gilbert retired in 1958 and died on 23 January 1975.

His great-uncle, also Joseph Trounsell Gilbert, had been attorney-general of British Guiana from 1863.
