= Lewis Balfour Oatts =

British soldier, historian, and writer (1902–1992)

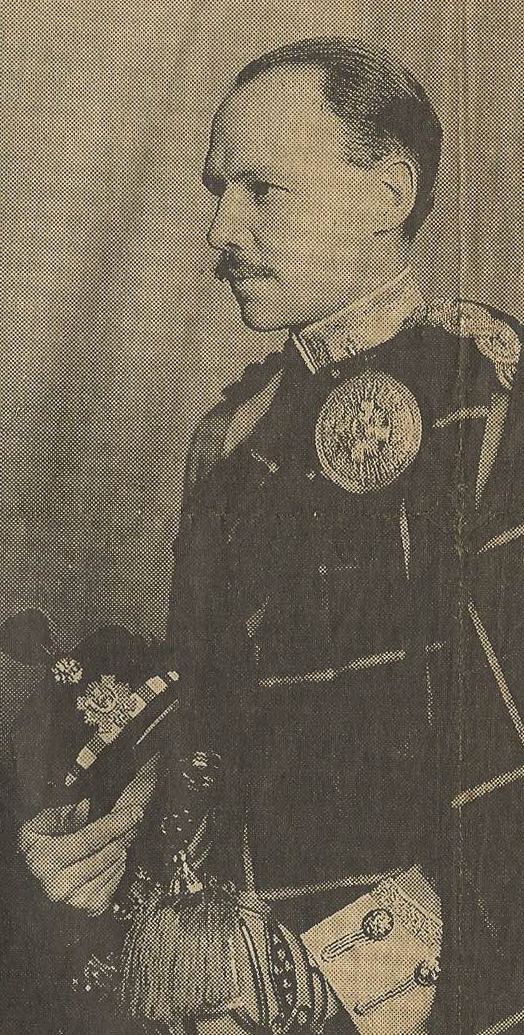
Lt. Col. L Balfour Oatts D.S.O, Highland Light Infantry

Lewis Balfour Oatts, DSO (1902–1992) was a British soldier, military historian and writer, who commanded two battalions in the remote Burmese jungle during the Second World War, winning a Distinguished Service Order. His autobiographical book Jungle in Arms was amongst his many publications on military history.

== Early life and career ==
An indigo planter's son, Lewis Balfour Oatts was born on 4 April 1902 and educated at Bedford and Sandhurst. He was commissioned into the Highland Light Infantry in 1922. Much of his early service was spent on the North-West Frontier in India. When his regiment had concluded its tour of duty in 1938, ‘Titus’ Oatts volunteered for service with the Burma Frontier Force in the Chin Hills. The Chin Hills extend along the Burma-India frontier for 300 miles, stretching from Manipur State to the Arakan. The first chapter in his book refers to his pre-World War Two experiences.

== Military service in Burma in World War II ==
His first assignment in 1940, in command of the Chin Levies, was to penetrate the Naga Hills, in areas previously unexplored, and put them under the administration of the Government of Burma. This was the only way by which the war-like Nagas could be prevented from raiding such adjoining areas as Assam to obtain slaves and victims for human sacrifices.

Lieutenant-Colonel Oatts’ first experience of these jungle people gave little indication of what valuable allies they would become. They had curious conventions of chivalry and would not fight invaders without a preliminary parley. On a remote jungle path Oatts would come upon a pile of branches with plantains laid on top; he would then wait with an interpreter, leaving his soldiers 200 yards behind. The Nagas, as he recalled, would then “suddenly materialise as if they had shot up out of trap doors”. At the end of the parley they disappeared just as quickly:

“One moment they were there, the next they were gone, without even the trembling of a leaf to mark their passage. They went into battle naked apart from spears, bows and an implement like an elongated meat chopper with which they were adept at removing people's heads. They also coated their bodies with lime from head to foot, giving them an extremely ghoulish appearance. Against this grey-white background their teeth and lips stood out in crimson paint, making it look as if they had been sucking someone's blood. Fixed to each man's temples, so skillfully that they seemed to be growing out of them, was a pair of immense buffalo horns, tricked out with human hair. However, lack of education did not mean that they were stupid or ignorant; far from it. They understood all about wildlife and the growing of crops. They could weave cloth and tan hides, work in metals, build houses and construct such works as suspension bridges for which a knowledge of mathematics is commonly held to be necessary.”

Paths to the remote country in which the Nagas lived invariably ran straight: “one day we would camp in a village at 1,000ft and the next go over a mountain 8,000ft high. When it rained the paths became rivers.” Unpromising though these initial encounters seemed, Oatts and his companions so impressed the Hagas that they became staunch allies against the Japanese.

General Bill Slim subsequently said that “their loyalty even in the most depressing time in their invasion never faltered. Despite floggings, tortures, executions, and the burning of their villages they refused to aid the Japanese in any way or to betray our troops: they guided our columns, collected information, ambushed enemy patrols, carried our supplies and brought in our wounded under the heaviest fire, and then, being the gentlemen they were, often refused all payment. Many a British and Indian soldier owes his life to the naked, head-hunting Nagas”.

Oatts, who was often surrounded by Japanese in the jungle, had a personal bodyguard which consisted of “a group of ‘retired’ bandits of extreme villainy but unsurpassable jungle craft”. His Chin Hills battalion consisted of numerous war-like peoples who had little in common and often spoke such different dialects that they could barely understand each other. When the Japanese carved their way through Burma in 1941 they did not at first press into the hills; when they did they met the Chin Levies and got the worst of it. Oatts recalled that one of the Levies regarded throwing hand grenades as effeminate. He preferred to stalk a Japanese soldier, let the lever go and then stuff it down his victim's neck; on one occasion he lost an arm but was not put off and regarded the incident as amusing.

The Levies' relationship with their seniors in the 17th Division was less than cordial: the Divisional Staff tended to regard them as too unorthodox while the Levies thought the Division too unenterprising. One of Oatts' officers sent the GOC six Japanese heads which his men had removed, hoping the General would then show similar enterprise; he was promptly sent back to England for psychiatric treatment. Nonetheless the 14th Army HQ was greatly impressed by the achievements of the Levies in harassing the Japanese and decided that Oatts should form two regular battalions. These then covered the British flank in the advance to the Irrawaddy. Lt. Col. L B Oatts won a DSO during this campaign.

== Later achievements ==
After the war Oatts became administrator at Arbury Hall, Warwickshire (the Gothick show-place of the FitzRoy Newdegates, Viscounts Daventry); then ran the Victoria League in Edinburgh. He was a member of the Royal Company of Archers, the Queen's Body Guard for Scotland.

Oatts published several books including Proud Heritage, in 1952, a four-volume history of the Highland Light Infantry; Emperor's Chambermaids [ASIN B00HXJN0VM], the story of the 14/20th King's Hussars; another of the 3rd Carabiniers (now part of the Scots Dragoon Guards); and the autobiographical Jungle in Arms, published in 1962.

He married, in 1934, Cherry Morris, daughter of a former captain of the Warwickshire Cricket Club, with whom he had two sons and a daughter.

The art dealer and writer Brian Balfour-Oatts is his grandson.

== Burial site ==
Lieutenant-Colonel Lewis Balfour Oatts died in December 1992, aged 90, and is buried at Rosslyn Chapel in Scotland, a privilege afforded the descendants of William Sinclair, 1st Earl of Caithness
