= Lester Paul Wright =

British civil servant

- Born: 2 July 1946
- Occupation: British civil servant

Lester Paul Wright (born 2 July 1946) is a former senior British civil servant.

Wright was educated at Bedford School, at Gonville and Caius College, Cambridge, where he completed his doctorate in 1971, at Harvard University and the University of California, Berkeley, where he was Harkness Fellow between 1976 and 1977. He was Private Secretary to the Permanent Under Secretary at the Home Office between 1980 and 1982, Assistant Secretary at the Home Office between 1983 and 1992, and Under Secretary at the Department for Culture, Media and Sport between 1992 and 1999.
