= Derek Bonham =

British industrialist

- Born: 12 July 1943; Swanbourne, Buckinghamshire
- Died: 3 September 2007 (aged 64)
- Occupations: chairman of Imperial Tobacco, Cadbury Schweppes and Marconi

Derek Charles Bonham (1943–2007), was a British industrialist who became chairman of Imperial Tobacco, Cadbury Schweppes and Marconi.

He was born on 12 July 1943 in the village of Swanbourne, Buckinghamshire, and educated at Bedford School. He was CEO of Hanson Group between 1992 and 1997, chairman of Imperial Tobacco between 1996 and 2007, chairman of Cadbury Schweppes between 2000 and 2003, and chairman of Marconi between 2001 and 2002.

Bonham died in London on 3 September 2007, aged 64.
