= Frank Palmer (Australian footballer) =

Australian rules footballer

Personal information
- Full name: Francis Russell Palmer
- Born: 18 June 1925; Port Melbourne, Victoria
- Died: 15 May 1970 (aged 44); Port Melbourne, Victoria
- Height: 175 cm (5 ft 9 in)
- Weight: 72 kg (159 lb)

Playing career^{1}
Years	Club	Games (Goals)
1950	South Melbourne	2 (1)
- ^{1} Playing statistics correct to the end of 1950.

Francis Russell Palmer (18 June 1925 – 15 May 1970) was an Australian rules footballer who played with South Melbourne in the Victorian Football League (VFL).
