= Ralph Joyce =

English cricketer

Ralph Joyce (28 August 1878 – 12 March 1908) was an English cricketer, active from 1896 to 1907, who played for Leicestershire. He was born in Leicestershire, educated at Bedford School and at Brasenose College, Oxford, and died in Ashbourne, Derbyshire. He appeared in 48 first-class matches as a righthanded batsman who bowled right arm slow. He scored 1,586 runs with a highest score of 102 and took eleven wickets with a best performance of two for 36.
