= Bernard Cooke Dixon =

British Army general

Major-General Bernard Cooke Dixon CB CBE MC
- Born: 7 September 1896; Tyldesley, Lancashire, England
- Died: 9 October 1973 (aged 77); Stafford, Staffordshire, England
- Military career
- Allegiance: United Kingdom
- Branch: British Army
- Service years: 1915–1948
- Rank: Major-General
- Service number: 11443
- Unit: Royal Engineers
- Conflicts: First World War; Second World War
- Awards: Companion of the Order of the Bath; Commander of the Order of the British Empire; Military Cross

Major-General Bernard Edward Cooke Dixon, CB, CBE, MC (7 September 1896 – 9 October 1973) was a senior British Army officer.

== Biography ==
Born on 7 September 1896, Bernard Cooke Dixon was educated at Bedford School and the Royal Military Academy, Woolwich. He received his first commission in the Royal Engineers in 1915 and served in France during the First World War. During the Second World War he served in the Middle East between 1940 and 1943, and in Italy between 1943 and 1944. He was engineer-in-charge at General Headquarters, Middle East, between 1944 and 1947, and chief engineer, Headquarters, Western Command, between 1947 and 1948.

Dixon was invested as a Commander of the Order of the British Empire in 1944 and as a Companion of the Order of the Bath in 1947. He retired from the British Army in 1948. In the early 1950s he was managing director of East Kilbride Development Corporation. He died on 9 October 1973.
