= William Carmichael Russell =

- Born: 11 August 1824
- Died: 10 February 1905 (aged 80); Shirley, Southampton
- Military career
- Allegiance: United Kingdom
- Branch: British Indian Army
- Service years: 1842 - 1878
- Rank: Major-General
- Unit: Bengal Artillery
- Conflicts: First Anglo-Sikh War; Indian Mutiny

Major-General William Carmichael Russell (1824–1905) was a senior Bengal Artillery officer who served in India.

== Biography ==
Born on 11 August 1824, William Carmichael Russell was educated at Bedford School. He received his first commission in the Bengal Artillery in June 1842. He served in India during the First Anglo-Sikh War, 1845–1846, and during the Indian Mutiny, 1857.

During the First Anglo-Sikh War he fought at the Battle of Ferozeshah, 1845, and at the Battle of Sobraon, 1846, and was awarded the Sutlej Medal. During the Indian Mutiny he served under Brigadier James Neill at Allahabad, and was credited by Field Marshal Roberts with saving the Allahabad arsenal from falling into the hands of the mutineers. In 1858, he served in Oudh. He was appointed Commissary of Ordnance for the Army and Inspector of Ordnance and Magazines in Bengal.

Major General William Carmichael Russell retired in March 1878 and died in Shirley, Southampton on 10 February 1905.
