= Hector Mackenzie Woodhouse =

Rear-Admiral Hector Mackenzie Woodhouse CB OBE
- Born: 15 February 1889
- Died: 5 June 1971 (aged 82); Cosham, Hampshire
- Military career
- Allegiance: United Kingdom
- Branch: Royal Navy
- Rank: Rear-Admiral
- Conflicts: First World War, Second World War
- Awards: CB, OBE

Rear-Admiral Hector Roy Mackenzie Woodhouse CB OBE (1889–1971) was a senior Royal Navy officer during the Second World War.

== Naval career ==
Born on 15 February 1889, Hector Mackenzie Woodhouse was educated at Bedford School. He entered in the Royal Navy in 1906 and served during the First World War and during the Second World War.

Rear Admiral Hector Mackenzie Woodhouse was appointed OBE in 1919, and CB in 1941. He retired from the Royal Navy in 1946 and died in Cosham, Hampshire on 5 June 1971.
