= Carol A.M. Bassett =

Bermudian politician and businessperson

Carol Ann Marie Bassett is a Bermudian businessperson and politician. She was a member of the Senate of Bermuda from 2003 to 2017 and served as Senate president.

She was born in Pembroke Parish and grew up there. She attended the Central School (later Victor Scott Primary), Prospect Secondary School for Girls and the Bermuda Technical Institute. She continued her education with business studies at the Cranleigh Secretarial School. She was mainly employed in the insurance industry, reaching the level of senior executive, and retiring in 2004 after 27 years.

She was named to the senate as an independent senator in 2003 by Governor John Vereker. She was elected president of the senate in 2008, the first woman to hold that post. She retired in August 2017.

She married Roderick Bassett; the couple had three sons.
