= George Drummond Robinson =

George Henkell Drummond Robinson
- Born: 1 October 1864; Kingston, Jamaica
- Died: 19 August 1950 (aged 85); Royston, Hertfordshire
- Scientific career
- Fields: Medicine
- Workplaces: West London Hospital, Westminster Hospital

George Henkell Drummond Robinson FRCP (1864–1950) was a senior British physician specialising in obstetrics.

== Biography ==
Born on 1 October 1864 in Kingston, Jamaica, George Drummond Robinson was educated at Bedford School and at the Medical College of St Bartholomew's Hospital, qualifying in 1889. He subsequently became a consultant physician at the West London Hospital and at the Westminster Hospital, specialising in the diseases of women. He was elected as a fellow of the Royal College of Physicians in 1906. He was an examiner in obstetric medicine for the University of Cambridge, and an examiner in midwifery and the diseases of women for the University of London, the Royal College of Surgeons and the Royal College of Physicians.

George Drummond Robinson published widely in the field of Obstetrics, and his publications included Some Micro-Organisms of Obstetrical and Gyaecological Interest, 1895, Progress of Gyaecology and Midwifery during the Queen's Reign, 1897, Vulval Discharges in Children, 1899, and An Atlas of Normal Labour, 1925.

George Drummond Robinson died in Royston, Hertfordshire on 19 August 1950.
