= Bermuda Hospitals Board =

Public hospital operator in Bermuda

The Bermuda Hospitals Board operates the King Edward VII Memorial Hospital, located in Paget Parish, and the Mid-Atlantic Wellness Institute, located in Devonshire Parish.

Dr Michael Richmond is the chief of staff.

It logged 430 incidents that resulted in harm to patients between March 28, 2011 and December 31, 2015. 14 patients died unexpectedly, 5 needed life-saving treatment and 9 suffered permanent harm. There were about 6,000 hospital admissions, 30,000 emergency department attendances and 6,300 outpatient procedures in 2017.

It started using a new electronic medical records system, called PEARL, in October 2022.

In October 2022 surgeons complained that supplies of specialist equipment used in the operating room of King Edward VII Memorial Hospital were constantly at risk of running out.
