= Francis Joyce =

English cricketer

Francis Matthew Joyce (16 December 1886 – 23 September 1958) was an English cricketer active from 1911 to 1920 who played for Leicestershire. He was born in Leicestershire, educated at Bedford School, and died in Earl's Court. He appeared in sixteen first-class matches as a righthanded batsman who bowled right arm fast medium. He scored 431 runs with a highest score of 73 and took seventeen wickets with a best performance of five for 117.
