= Francis Palmer (rugby union) =

England international rugby union player

- Born: Francis Hubert Palmer; 6 August 1877 Hereford, Herefordshire, England
- Died: 7 December 1951 (aged 74)
- School: Bedford School

Rugby union career
International career
Years	Team	Apps	(Points)
1905-1905	England	1	

Francis Hubert Palmer MC (6 August 1877 – 7 December 1951) was a rugby union international who represented England in 1905.

== Early life ==
Francis Palmer was born on 6 August 1877 in Hereford, England and educated at Bedford School. He played for England against Wales at Cardiff on 14 January 1905. He died on 7 December 1951.
