= John Le Mesurier (British Army officer) =

Lieutenant-General John Le Mesurier
- Born: 1 November 1834
- Died: 24 November 1903 (aged 69); Bedford
- Military career
- Allegiance: United Kingdom
- Branch: British Army
- Service years: 1853–1887
- Rank: Lieutenant-General
- Unit: Royal Engineers
- Conflicts: Anglo-Persian War

Lieutenant-General John Le Mesurier (1834–1903) was a senior British Army officer.

== Biography ==
Descended from the Hereditary Governors of Alderney and the Rt. Hon. Paul Le Mesurier MP, Lord Mayor of London between 1793 and 1794, John Le Mesurier was the son of Reverend Henry Le Mesurier, Usher at Bedford School. He was born on 1 November 1834, and educated at Bedford School between 1843 and 1850.

He received his first commission in the Royal Engineers on 9 December 1853, and was sent to India in November 1855, serving in Sind as an Assistant Engineer and as an Executive Engineer. He served during the Anglo-Persian War, between 1856 and 1857, and fought in the Battle of Bushire and in the Battle of Khushab. He was promoted to the rank of captain in 1861, to the rank of major in 1872, to the rank of lieutenant colonel in 1874, and to the rank of colonel on 1 April 1879. He was appointed as Joint Secretary to the Public Works Department of the Government of Bombay in 1884, and Superintending Engineer in Sind in 1886. He retired from the Royal Engineers as a lieutenant general on 24 March 1887.

He designed the club house of the Poona Club.

He died in Bedford on 24 November 1903, aged 69.

Lieutenant General John Le Mesurier was the grandfather of the actor John Le Mesurier, who said of him: "I am quite glad never to have come across him. I don't think I'd have survived the encounter."
