= Henry Calvert Stanley-Clarke =

Senior British Army officer during WW1

Brigadier-General Henry Calvert Stanley-Clarke CB CMG DSO DL
- Born: 6 December 1872
- Died: 27 February 1943 (aged 70); Sturminster Newton, Dorset
- Military career
- Allegiance: United Kingdom
- Branch: British Army
- Service years: 1893–1927
- Rank: Brigadier-General
- Unit: Royal Artillery
- Conflicts: First World War
- Awards: CB, CMG, DSO

Brigadier-General Henry Calvert Stanley-Clarke CB CMG DSO DL (1872–1943) was a senior British Army officer during the First World War.

== Biography ==
Born on 6 December 1872, Henry Calvert Stanley-Clarke was educated at Bedford School. He received his first commission as a second lieutenant in the Royal Artillery on 30 May 1893, was promoted to the rank of lieutenant in 1896, and to the rank of captain on 18 June 1900.

In early February 1902, he was appointed adjutant to the 37th Battalion, Imperial Yeomanry, and the following May left Aldershot with the battalion for service in the Second Boer War in South Africa. The battalion arrived after hostilities ended in late May, and left for home again on the SS Avondale Castle in late December 1902.

Two months later in February 1903 he relinquished the appointment in the yeomanry and returned to his regiment. He was promoted to the rank of major in 1910.

He served during the First World War, between 1914 and 1918, was promoted to the rank of lieutenant colonel in 1915, and to the rank of brigadier general in 1916. He was promoted on 3 June 1918 to brevet colonel "for distinguished service in connection with Military Operations in Italy".

Stanley-Clarke was appointed a Companion of the Distinguished Service Order (DSO) in 1915, as a Companion of the Order of St Michael and St George (CMG) in 1917, and as a Companion of the Order of the Bath (CB) in 1919.

He retired from the British Army in 1927 and died in Sturminster Newton, Dorset, on 27 February 1943, aged 70.
