= John Joye =

Member of the Parliament of England

John Joye or Joyce was a member of the Parliament of England for Lincoln in 1584.
