= Willoughby Clarke =

- Born: 22 August 1833
- Died: 26 May 1909 (aged 75); Bournemouth
- Military career
- Allegiance: United Kingdom
- Branch: British Indian Army
- Service years: 1851 - 1892
- Rank: Major General
- Conflicts: Santhal Rebellion; Second Opium War

Major-General Willoughby Charles Stanley Clarke (1833–1909) was a senior British Indian Army officer who served in India and China.

== Biography ==
Born on 22 August 1833, Willoughby Clarke was educated at Bedford School. He received his first commission in the British Indian Army on 23 September 1851. He served in India during the Santhal Rebellion, 1855–1856, and in China during the Second Opium War, 1856–1860.

Major General Willoughby Clarke died in Bournemouth on 26 May 1909.
