= Peter Edgar Corbett =

British art historian and classical scholar

- Born: 19 June 1920; Preston, Hertfordshire
- Died: 31 August 1992 (aged 72); London
- Education: Bedford School, St John's College, Oxford
- Scientific career
- Fields: art historian and classical scholar
- Workplaces: University College London

Professor Peter Edgar Corbett (19 June 1920 – 31 August 1992), was a British art historian and classical scholar.

== Biography ==
Born in Preston, Hertfordshire on 19 June 1920, Peter Corbett was educated at Bedford School and at St John's College, Oxford. He was Thomas Whitcombe Greene Scholar and Macmillan Student in the British School at Athens between 1947 and 1949, Assistant Keeper in the Department of Greek and Roman Antiquities at the British Museum between 1949 and 1961, Yates Professor of Classical Art and Archaeology at University College London between 1961 and 1982, and President of the Society for the Promotion of Hellenic Studies between 1980 and 1983.

Professor Peter Corbett died in London on 31 August 1992, aged 72.

== Publications ==
- The Sculpture of the Parthenon, 1959
- Greek Gods and Heroes, 1974
- Articles in the Journal of Hellenic Studies, Hesperia, The Annual of the British School at Athens, British Museum Quarterly, and the Bulletin of the Institute of Classical Studies
